= 2026 Grêmio FBPA season =

Grêmio
2026 season
- President: Odorico Roman
- Manager: Luís Castro (until 13 September); Luiz Felipe Scolari (interim) (since 13 September – until 16 September); Renato Portaluppi (since 14 September)
- Stadium: Arena do Grêmio
- Campeonato Brasileiro Série A: 18th
- Campeonato Gaúcho: Winners
- Copa do Brasil: Final
- Copa Sudamericana: Knockout round play-offs
- Top goalscorer: League: Carlos Vinícius (11); All: Carlos Vinícius (23)
- Highest home attendance: 55,695 vs Internacional; 3 September (Copa do Brasil)
- Lowest home attendance: 13,518 vs Deportivo Riestra; 14 April (Copa Sudamericana)
- Biggest win: 5–0 vs São Luiz (H); 17 January (Campeonato Gaúcho)
- Biggest defeat: 0–3 vs Atlético Mineiro (A); 16 August (Campeonato Brasileiro Série A)
Home colours	Away colours	Third colours

The 2026 season is the Grêmio Foot-Ball Porto Alegrense's 123rd season in existence and the club's. In addition to the Campeonato Brasileiro Série A, Grêmio participates in this season's editions of the Copa do Brasil, the Campeonato Gaúcho, and the Copa CONMEBOL Sudamericana.

== Squad information ==
As of 4 November 2026

No.	Player	Nat.	Position(s)	Date of birth (age)	Signed from	Signed in	Contract ends	Apps.	Goals
Goalkeepers
1	Weverton	(Brazil)	GK	13 December 1987 (age 38)	(Brazil) Palmeiras	2026	2028	52	0
12	Gabriel Grando	(Brazil)	GK	29 March 2000 (age 26)	(Brazil) Grêmio U20	2021	2029	108	0
24	Thiago Beltrame	(Brazil)	GK	2 July 2003 (age 23)	(Brazil) Grêmio U20	2025	2027	1	0
31	Gabriel Menegon	(Brazil)	GK	14 October 2008 (age 18)	(Brazil) Grêmio U20	2026	2028	1	0
Defenders
2	Fabián Balbuena	(Paraguay)	CB	23 August 1991 (age 35)	(Russia) Dynamo Moscow	2025	2027	21	2
3	Wagner Leonardo	(Brazil)	CB	23 July 1999 (age 27)	(Brazil) Vitória	2025	2028	63	2
4	Walter Kannemann (c)	(Argentina)	CB	14 March 1991 (age 35)	(Mexico) Atlas	2016	2027	354	6
6	Gustavo Martins	(Brazil)	CB / RB	11 August 2002 (age 24)	(Brazil) Grêmio U20	2022	2027	129	13
14	Marcos Rocha	(Brazil)	RB	11 December 1988 (age 37)	(Brazil) Palmeiras	2025	2026	28	0
18	João Pedro	(Brazil)	RB	15 November 1996 (age 30)	(Portugal) Porto	2023	2027	137	7
23	Marlon	(Brazil)	LB	20 May 1997 (age 29)	(Brazil) Cruzeiro	2025	2028	62	3
27	Diego Caito	(Brazil)	RB	7 June 2004 (age 22)	(Brazil) Goiás (loan)	2026	2026	14	1
32	Vitor Ramon	(Brazil)	RB	15 January 2008 (age 18)	(Brazil) Grêmio U20	2026	2028	1	0
38	Caio Paulista	(Brazil)	LB / LW	11 May 1998 (age 28)	(Brazil) Palmeiras (loan)	2026	2026	26	0
43	Luis Eduardo	(Brazil)	CB	16 January 2008 (age 18)	(Brazil) Grêmio U20	2025	2028	7	0
54	Pedro Gabriel	(Brazil)	LB	6 June 2007 (age 19)	(Brazil) Grêmio U20	2025	2030	27	0
82	Wallace	(Brazil)	CB	6 December 2004 (age 21)	(Brazil) CRB	2026	2031	17	2
Midfielders
5	Juan Nardoni	(Argentina)	DM / CM	14 July 2002 (age 24)	(Argentina) Racing	2026	2029	26	1
8	Erick Noriega	(Peru)	DM / CB	22 October 2001 (age 25)	(Peru) Alianza Lima	2025	2028	59	2
10	Filip Krovinović	(Croatia)	AM / CM	29 August 1995 (age 31)	(Croatia) Hajduk Split	2026	2028	12	1
15	Danilo Barbosa	(Brazil)	DM	28 February 1996 (age 30)	(Saudi Arabia) Al-Ula	2026	2028	9	0
17	Dodi	(Brazil)	DM	17 April 1996 (age 30)	(Brazil) Santos	2024	2026	133	1
20	Mathías Villasanti (vc)	(Paraguay)	CM / DM	24 January 1997 (age 29)	(Paraguay) Cerro Porteño	2021	2029	215	16
39	Tiago	(Brazil)	CM / AM	2 February 2008 (age 18)	(Brazil) Grêmio U20	2026	2027	9	0
40	Jeferson Forneck	(Brazil)	AM	14 December 2006 (age 19)	(Brazil) Grêmio U20	2026	2027	4	0
50	Zortea	(Brazil)	CM	21 March 2007 (age 19)	(Brazil) Grêmio U20	2026	2027	5	0
65	Riquelme	(Brazil)	AM / LW	13 August 2006 (age 20)	(Brazil) Grêmio U20	2024	2027	21	1
Forwards
7	Cristian Pavon	(Argentina)	RW / RB / LW	21 January 1996 (age 30)	(Brazil) Atlético Mineiro	2024	2026	128	13
9	Francis Amuzu	(Ghana)	LW	23 August 1999 (age 27)	(Belgium) Anderlecht	2025	2026	84	14
11	Tetê	(Brazil)	RW / LW / AM	15 February 2000 (age 26)	(Greece) Panathinaikos	2026	2029	44	4
22	Martin Braithwaite	(Denmark)	CF / SS	5 June 1991 (age 35)	(Spain) Espanyol	2024	2027	94	28
30	Matheus Nascimento	(Brazil)	CF	3 March 2004 (age 22)	(Brazil) Botafogo	2026	2030	5	0
47	Roger	(Brazil)	RW	29 April 2008 (age 18)	(Brazil) Grêmio U20	2026	2028	8	1
77	Jovane Cabral	(Cape Verde)	LW / RW	14 June 1998 (age 28)	(Portugal) Estrela da Amadora	2026	2027	9	1
95	Carlos Vinícius	(Brazil)	CF	25 March 1995 (age 31)	(England) Fulham	2025	2026	68	34
99	José Enamorado	(Colombia)	RW / LW	13 January 1999 (age 27)	(Colombia) Junior Barranquilla	2026	2028	49	1

== Pre-season and friendlies ==
27 June Friendly	Cascavel	1–2	Grêmio	Cascavel
16:00 UTC−3	Willian 11'	Report	Carlos Vinícius 39', 64'	Stadium: Olímpico Regional; Referee: Kleber Ariel Gonçalves da Silva

4 July Friendly	Grêmio	1–2	Chapecoense	Sinop
19:00 UTC−3	Pavon 55'	Report	Bolasie 19'; Everton 21'	Stadium: Estádio Municipal Gigante do Norte

12 July Friendly	Cruzeiro	1–3	Grêmio	Brasília
17:00 UTC−3	Sinisterra 27'	Report	Carlos Vinícius 21'; Nardoni 37'; Matheus Nascimento 90+5' (pen.)	Stadium: Estádio Nacional Mané Garrincha; Referee: Pedro Alves de Oliveira

== Competitions ==
=== Overview ===
Competition	First match	Last match	Starting round	Final position	Record							
Competition	First match	Last match	Starting round	Final position	Pld	W	D	L	GF	GA	GD	Win %
Campeonato Brasileiro Série A	28 January	2 December	Matchday 1	TBD	35	9	11	15	38	47	−9	25.71
Campeonato Gaúcho	10 January	8 March	Group stage	Winners	11	5	4	2	21	9	+12	45.45
Copa do Brasil	21 April	TBD	Fifth round	TBD	8	5	3	0	13	3	+10	62.50
Copa CONMEBOL Sudamericana	8 April	30 July	Group stage	Knockout round play-offs	8	3	2	3	10	7	+3	37.50
Total					62	22	20	20	82	66	+16	35.48

Last updated: 18 November 2026
Source: Soccerway

=== Campeonato Gaúcho ===
==== Results summary ====
Overall								Home						Away					
Pld	W	D	L	GF	GA	GD	Pts	W	D	L	GF	GA	GD	W	D	L	GF	GA	GD
6	3	1	2	14	6	+8	10	1	1	1	6	2	+4	2	0	1	8	4	+4

Source: Soccerway

==== Group stage ====
Pos	Team	Pld	W	D	L	GF	GA	GD	Pts	Qualification or relegation
1	Grêmio	6	3	1	2	14	6	+8	10	Knockout stage
2	Caxias	6	2	1	3	8	5	+3	7	Knockout stage
3	Ypiranga	6	1	4	1	7	9	−2	7	Knockout stage
4	Novo Hamburgo	6	1	3	2	5	5	0	6	Knockout stage
5	Monsoon	6	1	3	2	5	11	−6	6	Relegation stage
6	Internacional de Santa Maria	6	1	2	3	1	4	−3	5	Relegation stage

Source: FGF

===== Results by matchday =====
Matchday	1	2	3	4	5	6
Ground	A	H	H	A	A	H
Result	W	L	W	W	L	D
Position	1	2	2	1	1	1

Source: Soccerway
A = Away; H = Home; W = Win; D = Draw; L = Loss

===== Matches =====
The group stage fixtures were announced on 21 November 2025.

Note: Match numbers indicated on the left hand side are references to the matchday scheduled by the Campeonato Gaúcho and not the order matches were played after postponements and rescheduled matches.

10 January 1	Avenida	0–4	Grêmio	Santa Cruz do Sul
21:00 UTC−3		Report	Amuzu 46'; Wagner Leonardo 49'; Roger 54'; Arthur 72'	Stadium: Estádio dos Eucaliptos; Attendance: 2,828; Referee: Eduardo Fernandes Bastos

14 January 2	Grêmio	0–1	São José	Porto Alegre
21:30 UTC−3		Report	Ronald Barcellos 45+2'	Stadium: Arena do Grêmio; Attendance: 0 Referee: Elias da Silva Elyseu

17 January 3	Grêmio	5–0	São Luiz	Porto Alegre
19:00 UTC−3	Thainler 3' (o.g.); Carlos Vinícius 16', 33', 66'; Cristaldo 55'	Report		Stadium: Arena do Grêmio; Attendance: 21,604; Referee: Rafael Rodrigo Klein

21 January 4	Guarany de Bagé	0–2	Grêmio	Bagé
21:30 UTC−3	Michel Bennech (red card) 50'	Report	Carlos Vinícius 74'; Edenilson 82'	Stadium: Estádio Estrela D'Alva; Attendance: 3,086; Referee: Rodrigo Brand da Silva

25 January 5	Internacional	4–2	Grêmio	Porto Alegre
20:00 UTC−3	Marcos Rocha 10' (o.g.); Borré 74', 76'; Bernabei 82'	Report	Amuzu 5'; Edenilson 66'	Stadium: Beira-Rio; Attendance: 32,411; Referee: Lucas Guimarães Rechatiko Horn

31 January 6	Grêmio	1–1	Juventude	Porto Alegre
16:30 UTC−3	Arthur (red card) 53'; Monsalve 86'; Pavon (red card) 90+11'	Report	Gabriel Pinheiro (red card) 54'; Juan Christian 90+9'	Stadium: Arena do Grêmio; Attendance: 13,656; Referee: Eduardo Fernandes Bastos

==== Knockout stage ====
===== Quarter-finals =====
7 February Single match	Grêmio	1–0	Novo Hamburgo	Porto Alegre
18:30 UTC−3	Carlos Vinícius 56' (pen.); Noriega (red card) 86'	Report		Stadium: Arena do Grêmio; Attendance: 17,517; Referee: Rafael Rodrigo Klein

==== Semi-finals ====
15 February First leg	Grêmio	1–1	Juventude	Porto Alegre
17:30 UTC−3	Tetê 39'	Report	Patryck Lanza 57'; Leo Índio (red card) 83'	Stadium: Arena do Grêmio; Attendance: 21,740; Referee: Wagner Silveira Echevarria

22 February Second leg	Juventude	1–1 (2–2 agg.) (1–4 p)	Grêmio	Caxias do Sul
18:00 UTC−3	Taliari 24'	Report	Viery 74'	Stadium: Estádio Alfredo Jaconi; Attendance: 12,263; Referee: Rafael Rodrigo Klein
	Penalties
	Rodrigo Sam (penalty missed); Juan Christian (penalty missed); Mandaca (penalty scored)		(penalty scored) Carlos Vinícius; (penalty scored) Noriega; (penalty scored) Gabriel Mec; (penalty scored) Marlon

==== Finals ====
1 March First leg	Grêmio	3–0	Internacional	Porto Alegre
18:00 UTC−3	Enamorado 39'; Amuzu 45+1'; Victor Gabriel 67' (o.g.)	Report	Bernabei (red card) 33'	Stadium: Arena do Grêmio; Attendance: 50,166; Referee: Anderson Daronco

8 March Second leg	Internacional	1–1 (1–4 agg.)	Grêmio	Porto Alegre
18:00 UTC−3	Alan Patrick 82' (pen.)	Report	Gustavo Martins 45+9'; Wagner Leonardo (red card) 78'	Stadium: Beira-Rio; Attendance: 41,251; Referee: Rafael Rodrigo Klein

=== Campeonato Brasileiro Série A ===
==== League table ====
Pos	Team	Pld	W	D	L	GF	GA	GD	Pts	Qualification or relegation
16	Corinthians	35	10	10	15	40	42	−2	40	
17	Internacional	35	9	11	15	39	44	−5	38	Relegation to Campeonato Brasileiro Série B
18	Grêmio (Note: Grêmio qualified for the Copa Libertadores group stage as 2026 Copa do Brasil champions or runners-up. If they are relegated, their berth will be passed to the Série A's highest-placed team not already qualified.)	35	9	11	15	38	47	−9	38	Relegation to Campeonato Brasileiro Série B
19	Remo	35	7	11	17	39	57	−18	32	Relegation to Campeonato Brasileiro Série B
20	Chapecoense (R)	35	4	9	22	33	72	−39	21	Relegation to Campeonato Brasileiro Série B

Updated to match(es) played on 19 November 2026. Source: CBF
Rules for classification: 1) points; 2) wins; 3) goal difference; 4) goals scored; 5) head-to-head results (only between two teams); 6) fewest red cards; 7) fewest yellow cards; 8) drawing of lots.
(R) Relegated

==== Results summary ====
Overall								Home						Away					
Pld	W	D	L	GF	GA	GD	Pts	W	D	L	GF	GA	GD	W	D	L	GF	GA	GD
35	9	11	15	38	47	−9	38	8	6	4	27	21	+6	1	5	11	11	26	−15

Source: Soccerway

==== Results by matchday ====
Matchday	1	2	3	4	5	6	7	8	9	10	11	12	13	14	15	16	17	18	19	20	21	22	23	24	25	26	27	28	29	30	31	32	33	34	35	36	37	38
Ground	A	H	A	H	H	A	H	A	A	H	A	A	H	A	H	A	H	H	A	H	A	H	A	A	H	A	H	H	A	H	H	A	H	A	H	A	A	H
Result	L	W	L	W	D	D	W	L	L	D	D	L	W	D	L	D	W	L	L	D	L	W	L	L	W	L	L	D	D	D	L	W	W	L	D			
Position	13	9	13	8	9	7	7	8	10	11	12	13	11	14	17	15	14	16	16	15	16	14	15	15	15	15	16	17	18	18	18	17	15	18	18			

Source: Confederação Brasileira de Futebol
A = Away; H = Home; W = Win; D = Draw; L = Loss; P = Postponed

==== Matches ====
The league fixtures were announced on 16 December 2025.

28 January 1	Fluminense	2–1	Grêmio	Rio de Janeiro
19:30 UTC−3	Nonato 47'; Acosta 59'	Report	Carlos Vinícius 75'	Stadium: Maracanã; Attendance: 22,986; Referee: Davi de Oliveira Lacerda

4 February 2	Grêmio	5–3	Botafogo	Porto Alegre
21:30 UTC−3	Carlos Vinícius 26', 50', 57' (pen.); Tetê 60'; Edenilson 79'	Report	Arthur Cabral 17'; Danilo 36', 86'	Stadium: Arena do Grêmio; Attendance: 18,573; Referee: Felipe Fernandes de Lima

11 February 3	São Paulo	2–0	Grêmio	São Paulo
21:30 UTC−3	Lucas 24' (pen.); Calleri 59'; Luciano (penalty missed) , 64'	Report	Wagner Leonardo (red card) 47'	Stadium: MorumBIS; Attendance: 18,491; Referee: Sávio Pereira Sampaio

25 February 4	Grêmio	2–1	Atlético Mineiro	Porto Alegre
21:30 UTC−3	Noriega 51'; Marlon 66'	Report	Natanael (red card) 17'; Victor Hugo 56'	Stadium: Arena do Grêmio; Attendance: 15,714; Referee: Raphael Claus

12 March 5	Grêmio	1–1	Red Bull Bragantino	Porto Alegre
21:30 UTC−3	Carlos Vinícius 7'	Report	Rodriguinho 66'	Stadium: Arena do Grêmio; Attendance: 19,472; Referee: Davi de Oliveira Lacerda

16 March 6	Chapecoense	1–1	Grêmio	Chapecó
20:00 UTC−3	Clar 28' (pen.)	Report	Nardoni 45+4'	Stadium: Arena Condá; Attendance: 19,307; Referee: Bruno Pereira Vasconcelos

19 March 7	Grêmio	2–0	Vitória	Porto Alegre
19:00 UTC−3	Camutanga 27' (o.g.); Amuzu 54'	Report		Stadium: Arena do Grêmio; Attendance: 20,206; Referee: Alex Gomes Stefano

22 March 8	Vasco	2–1	Grêmio	Rio de Janeiro
16:00 UTC−3	Thiago Mendes 7'; David 34'	Report	Carlos Vinícius 38'	Stadium: Estádio São Januário; Attendance: 22,650; Referee: Davi de Oliveira Lacerda

2 April 9	Palmeiras	2–1	Grêmio	Barueri
21:30 UTC−3	Marlon Freitas 44', 72'	Report	Carlos Vinícius 54'	Stadium: Arena Barueri; Attendance: 13,572; Referee: Bruno Arleu de Araújo

5 April 10	Grêmio	0–0	Remo	Porto Alegre
20:30 UTC−3		Report	Alef Manga (penalty missed) , 43'; Yago Pikachu (red card) 68'	Stadium: Arena do Grêmio; Attendance: 23,543; Referee: Edina Alves Batista

11 April 11	Internacional	0–0	Grêmio	Porto Alegre
20:30 UTC−3		Report	Viery (red card) 89'	Stadium: Beira-Rio; Attendance: 39,135; Referee: Bruno Arleu de Araújo

18 April 12	Cruzeiro	2–0	Grêmio	Belo Horizonte
20:30 UTC−3	Christian 51'; Romero 66'	Report		Stadium: Mineirão; Attendance: 28,279; Referee: Raphael Claus

26 April 13	Grêmio	1–0	Coritiba	Porto Alegre
16:00 UTC−3	Gabriel Mec 43'	Report	Bruno Melo (red card) 30'; Jacy (red card) 90+8'	Stadium: Arena do Grêmio; Attendance: 35,443; Referee: Felipe Fernandes de Lima

2 May 14	Athletico Paranaense	0–0	Grêmio	Curitiba
20:30 UTC−3	Esquivel (red card) 33'	Report	Riquelme (red card) 84'	Stadium: Arena da Baixada; Attendance: 26,753; Referee: Sávio Pereira Sampaio

10 May 15	Grêmio	0–1	Flamengo	Porto Alegre
19:30 UTC−3		Report	Carrascal 68'	Stadium: Arena do Grêmio; Attendance: 30,891; Referee: Davi de Oliveira Lacerda

17 May 16	Bahia	1–1	Grêmio	Salvador
16:00 UTC−3	Sanabria 72'	Report	Viery 62'	Stadium: Arena Fonte Nova; Attendance: 26,927; Referee: Fernando Antônio Mendes de Salles Nascimento Filho

23 May 17	Grêmio	3–2	Santos	Porto Alegre
19:00 UTC−3	Carlos Vinícius 40', 59'; Tetê 63'	Report	Gabriel Barbosa 32', 55'; Gustavinho (red card) 84'	Stadium: Arena do Grêmio; Attendance: 37,385; Referee: Bruno Arleu de Araújo

30 May 18	Grêmio	1–3	Corinthians	Porto Alegre
17:30 UTC−3	Gabriel Mec 7'; Thiago Beltrame (red card) 75'	Report	André 45+2', 65'; Kaio César 67'	Stadium: Arena do Grêmio; Attendance: 42,359; Referee: Lucas Paulo Torezin

16 July 19	Mirassol	2–1	Grêmio	Mirassol
21:30 UTC−3	Bruno Santos 16'; Edson Carioca 40'	Report	Carlos Vinícius 77'	Stadium: José Maria de Campos Maia; Attendance: 4,593; Referee: Bruno Arleu de Araújo

26 July 20	Grêmio	1–1	Fluminense	Porto Alegre
18:30 UTC−3	Diego Caito 89'	Report	Hulk 65' (pen.)	Stadium: Arena do Grêmio; Attendance: 23,993; Referee: Edina Alves Batista

8 August 22	Grêmio	2–1	São Paulo	Porto Alegre
16:00 UTC−3	Wallace 48'; Pavon 86'	Report	Gustavo Martins 45+2' (o.g.)	Stadium: Arena do Grêmio; Attendance: 34,783; Referee: André Luiz Skettino Policarpo Bento

16 August 23	Atlético Mineiro	3–0	Grêmio	Belo Horizonte
16:00 UTC−3	Vitor Hugo 19'; Cuello 62', 66'	Report		Stadium: Arena MRV; Attendance: 30,126; Referee: Bruno Arleu de Araújo

23 August 24	Red Bull Bragantino	1–0	Grêmio	Bragança Paulista
16:00 UTC−3	Gustavo Marques 90+5'	Report		Stadium: Estádio Cícero de Souza Marques; Attendance: 4,485; Referee: Felipe Fernandes de Lima

30 August 25	Grêmio	3–1	Chapecoense	Porto Alegre
18:30 UTC−3	Gustavo Martins 18', 56'; Pavon 28'	Report	Garcez 15'	Stadium: Arena do Grêmio; Attendance: 22,522; Referee: Rodrigo José Pereira de Lima

7 September 26	Vitória	1–0	Grêmio	Salvador
20:00 UTC−3	Renê 63'	Report		Stadium: Barradão; Attendance: 8,885; Referee: Sávio Pereira Sampaio

12 September 27	Grêmio	1–2	Vasco	Porto Alegre
16:00 UTC−3	Villasanti 39'	Report	Thiago Mendes 76'; Colidio 80'	Stadium: Arena do Grêmio; Attendance: 34,023; Referee: Raphael Claus

16 September 21	Botafogo	3–2	Grêmio	Rio de Janeiro
19:30 UTC−3	Danilo 30', 79'; Montoro 52'	Report	Jovane 36'; Gustavo Martins 88'	Stadium: Estádio Nilton Santos; Attendance: 9,725; Referee: Edina Alves Batista

20 September 28	Grêmio	0–0	Palmeiras	Porto Alegre
11:00 UTC−3		Report		Stadium: Arena do Grêmio; Attendance: 50,392; Referee: Paulo César Zanovelli da Silva

7 October 29	Remo	1–1	Grêmio	Belém
19:30 UTC−3	David Braga 88'	Report	Kannemann 45+3'	Stadium: Mangueirão; Attendance: 17,944; Referee: Davi de Oliveira Lacerda

11 October 30	Grêmio	1–1	Internacional	Porto Alegre
17:30 UTC−3	Wallace 73'	Report	Vitinho 33'	Stadium: Arena do Grêmio; Attendance: 53,134; Referee: Rodrigo José Pereira de Lima

18 October 31	Grêmio	2–4	Cruzeiro	Porto Alegre
16:00 UTC−3	Carlos Vinícius 17' (pen.); Pavon 41'; Kannemann (red card) 73'	Report	Kaio Jorge 23', 48', 61'; João Marcelo 80'	Stadium: Arena do Grêmio; Attendance: 31,546; Referee: João Vitor Gobi

26 October 32	Coritiba	0–1	Grêmio	Curitiba
19:30 UTC−3		Report	Braithwaite 90+2'	Stadium: Estádio Couto Pereira; Attendance: 30,759; Referee: Ramon Abatti Abel

29 October 33	Grêmio	2–0	Athletico Paranaense	Porto Alegre
21:30 UTC−3	Marlon 39'; Balbuena 52'	Report		Stadium: Arena do Grêmio; Attendance: 34,769; Referee: Alex Gomes Stefano

4 November 34	Flamengo	3–1	Grêmio	Rio de Janeiro
19:30 UTC−3	Samuel Lino 20'; Pedro 28', 45+2'	Report	Amuzu 69'	Stadium: Maracanã; Attendance: 67,164; Referee: Paulo César Zanovelli da Silva

18 November 35	Grêmio	0–0	Bahia	Porto Alegre
21:30 UTC−3		Report		Stadium: Arena do Grêmio; Referee: Davi de Oliveira Lacerda

23 November 36	Santos	v	Grêmio	Santos
21:00 UTC−3		Report		Stadium: Vila Belmiro

29 November 37	Corinthians	v	Grêmio	São Paulo
18:30 UTC−3		Report		Stadium: Neo Química Arena

2 December 38	Grêmio	v	Mirassol	Porto Alegre
21:30 UTC−3		Report		Stadium: Arena do Grêmio

=== Copa CONMEBOL Sudamericana ===
==== Group stage ====
The draw for the group stage was held on 19 March 2026, 20:00 UTC−03:00, at the CONMEBOL Convention Centre in Luque, Paraguay.

Pos	Team	Pld	W	D	L	GF	GA	GD	Pts	Qualification	MCT	GRE	DRI	PAL
1	(Uruguay) Montevideo City Torque	6	4	1	1	11	5	+6	13	Advance to round of 16	—	1–0	4–1	1–0
2	(Brazil) Grêmio	6	3	2	1	8	3	+5	11	Advance to knockout round play-offs	2–2	—	1–0	2–0
3	(Argentina) Deportivo Riestra	6	1	2	3	4	10	−6	5		2–1	0–3	—	0–0
4	(Chile) Palestino	6	0	3	3	1	6	−5	3		0–2	0–0	1–1	—

Source: CONMEBOL
Rules for classification: 1) Points; 2) Head-to-head points; 3) Head-to-head goal difference; 4) Head-to-head goals scored; 5) Goal difference; 6) Goals scored; 7) Red cards; 8) Yellow cards; 9) Drawing of lots.

==== Results by matchday ====
Matchday	1	2	3	4	5	6
Ground	A	H	A	A	H	H
Result	L	W	D	W	W	D
Position	4	2	2	2	2	2

Source: CONMEBOL
A = Away; H = Home; W = Win; D = Draw; L = Loss

==== Matches ====
8 April 1	Montevideo City Torque (Uruguay)	1–0	(Brazil) Grêmio	Montevideo, Uruguay
21:30 UTC−3	Agüero 49'	Report		Stadium: Estadio Centenario; Referee: Augusto Aragón (Ecuador)

14 April 2	Grêmio (Brazil)	1–0	(Argentina) Deportivo Riestra	Porto Alegre, Brazil
19:00 UTC−3	Nardoni (red card) 48'; Amuzu 87'	Report		Stadium: Arena do Grêmio; Attendance: 13,518; Referee: Gery Vargas (Bolivia)

29 April 3	Palestino (Chile)	0–0	(Brazil) Grêmio	Santiago, Chile
21:30 UTC−3	F. Meza (red card) 87'		Carlos Vinícius (penalty missed) , 14', 17'	Stadium: Estadio Municipal de La Cisterna; Referee: Guillermo Guerrero (Ecuador)

5 May 4	Deportivo Riestra (Argentina)	0–3	(Brazil) Grêmio	Buenos Aires, Argentina
19:00 UTC−3		Report	Carlos Vinícius 30' (pen.); Amuzu 59'; Braithwaite 73'	Stadium: Estadio Pedro Bidegain; Referee: Mario Díaz de Vivar (Paraguay)

20 May 5	Grêmio (Brazil)	2–0	(Chile) Palestino	Porto Alegre, Brazil
21:00 UTC−3	Braithwaite 4'; Pavon 68'	Report		Stadium: Arena do Grêmio; Attendance: 13,757; Referee: Carlos Benítez (Paraguay)

26 May 6	Grêmio (Brazil)	2–2	(Uruguay) Montevideo City Torque	Porto Alegre, Brazil
19:00 UTC−3	Gabriel Mec 47'; Carlos Vinícius 89' (pen.), (red card) 90+7'	Report	Rodríguez 37'; Pizzichillo 84'	Stadium: Arena do Grêmio; Attendance: 19,461; Referee: Jesús Valenzuela (Venezuela)

==== Knockout round play-offs ====
23 July First leg	Bolívar (Bolivia)	3–2	(Brazil) Grêmio	La Paz, Bolivia
19:00 UTC−3	Cauteruccio 2'; Robson Matheus 18'; Asprilla 58'	Report	Villasanti 16'; Tetê 23'	Stadium: Hernando Siles; Referee: Roberto Pérez (Peru)

30 July Second leg	Grêmio (Brazil)	0–1 (2–4 agg.)	(Bolivia) Bolívar	Porto Alegre, Brazil
19:00 UTC−3	Noriega (red card) 90+2'; Marlon (red card) 90+8'		Asprilla 16'; Justiniano (red card) 90+2'	Stadium: Arena do Grêmio; Attendance: 25,010; Referee: Piero Maza (Chile)

=== Copa do Brasil ===
==== Fifth round ====
The draw for the fifth round was held on 23 March, 14:00 UTC−03:00, at the CBF headquarters in Rio de Janeiro.

21 April First leg	Grêmio	2–0	Confiança	Porto Alegre
19:30 UTC−3	Carlos Vinícius 56'; Amuzu 71'	Report	Ícaro (red card) 38'	Stadium: Arena do Grêmio; Attendance: 18,350; Referee: João Vitor Gobi

14 May Second leg	Confiança	0–3 (0–5 agg.)	Grêmio	Aracaju
19:00 UTC−3		Report	Braithwaite 14' (pen.), 58'; Willian 71' (pen.); Kannemann (red card) 74'	Stadium: Batistão; Attendance: 5,040; Referee: Lucas Paulo Torezin

==== Round of 16 ====
2 August First leg	Mirassol	1–1	Grêmio	Mirassol
18:00 UTC−3	Bruno Santos 19'	Report	Amuzu 51'	Stadium: José Maria de Campos Maia; Attendance: 5,592; Referee: Sávio Pereira Sampaio

5 August Second leg	Grêmio	1–0 (2–1 agg.)	Mirassol	Porto Alegre
19:30 UTC−3	Pavon 37'	Report		Stadium: Arena do Grêmio; Attendance: 24,478; Referee: Davi de Oliveira Lacerda

==== Quarter-finals ====
27 August First leg	Internacional	0–0	Grêmio	Porto Alegre
20:00 UTC−3		Report		Stadium: Beira-Rio; Attendance: 43,970; Referee: Ramon Abatti Abel

3 September Second leg	Grêmio	3–1 (3–1 agg.)	Internacional	Porto Alegre
20:00 UTC−3	Carlos Vinícius 14', 22'; Krovinović 68'	Report	Vitinho 79'	Stadium: Arena do Grêmio; Attendance: 55,695; Referee: Bruno Arleu de Araújo

==== Semi-finals ====
1 November First leg	Grêmio	2–0	Atlético Mineiro	Porto Alegre
18:30 UTC−3	Carlos Vinícius 11'; Noriega 47'; Gustavo Martins (red card) 90+5'	Report		Stadium: Arena do Grêmio; Attendance: 50,928; Referee: Davi de Oliveira Lacerda

7 November Second leg	Atlético Mineiro	1–1 (1–3 agg.)	Grêmio	Belo Horizonte
18:00 UTC−3	Renan Lodi 26'; Vitão (red card) 87'	Report	Carlos Vinícius 38'	Stadium: Arena MRV; Attendance: 42,922; Referee: Ramon Abatti Abel

==== Final ====
6 December	Grêmio	v	Palmeiras	Brasília
--:-- UTC−3		Report		Stadium: Estádio Nacional Mané Garrincha; Referee: TBD

== Statistics ==
=== Squad statistics ===
No.	Pos	Nat	Player	Total		Campeonato Brasileiro		Campeonato Gaúcho		Copa do Brasil		Copa Sudamericana	
No.	Pos	Nat	Player	Apps	Goals	Apps	Goals	Apps	Goals	Apps	Goals	Apps	Goals
Goalkeepers
1	GK	(Brazil) BRA	Weverton	52	0	31	0	7	0	7	0	7	0
12	GK	(Brazil) BRA	Gabriel Grando	6	0	2	0	3	0	0	0	1	0
24	GK	(Brazil) BRA	Thiago Beltrame	1	0	1	0	0	0	0	0	0	0
31	GK	(Brazil) BRA	Gabriel Menegon	1	0	0+1	0	0	0	0	0	0	0
Defenders
2	DF	(Paraguay) PAR	Fabián Balbuena	18	1	10	1	3	0	1+1	0	2+1	0
3	DF	(Brazil) BRA	Wagner Leonardo	21	1	9+2	0	4+1	1	0+1	0	2+2	0
4	DF	(Argentina) ARG	Walter Kannemann	17	1	7+2	1	1+1	0	2+1	0	2+1	0
6	DF	(Brazil) BRA	Gustavo Martins	40	4	21+3	3	5+1	1	5+1	0	3+1	0
14	DF	(Brazil) BRA	Marcos Rocha	16	0	3+4	0	5+1	0	0+1	0	1+1	0
18	DF	(Brazil) BRA	João Pedro	16	0	6+5	0	4	0	1	0	0	0
23	DF	(Brazil) BRA	Marlon	27	2	14	2	6+1	0	5	0	0+1	0
27	DF	(Brazil) BRA	Diego Caito	14	1	9+1	1	0	0	4	0	0	0
32	DF	(Brazil) BRA	Vitor Ramon	1	0	0+1	0	0	0	0	0	0	0
38	DF	(Brazil) BRA	Caio Paulista	26	0	7+9	0	4+1	0	1+1	0	2+1	0
43	DF	(Brazil) BRA	Luis Eduardo	6	0	2	0	1	0	0	0	3	0
54	DF	(Brazil) BRA	Pedro Gabriel	25	0	14+3	0	0	0	1+1	0	6	0
82	DF	(Brazil) BRA	Wallace	17	2	12	2	0	0	5	0	0	0
Midfielders
5	MF	(Argentina) ARG	Juan Nardoni	26	1	14+4	1	0	0	3+1	0	2+2	0
8	MF	(Peru) PER	Erick Noriega	45	2	22+3	1	7+1	0	6	1	4+2	0
10	MF	(Croatia) CRO	Filip Krovinović	12	1	7+3	0	0	0	2	1	0	0
15	MF	(Brazil) BRA	Danilo Barbosa	9	0	4+3	0	0	0	0+2	0	0	0
17	MF	(Brazil) BRA	Dodi	25	0	4+7	0	4+4	0	0+2	0	4	0
20	MF	(Paraguay) PAR	Mathías Villasanti	22	2	15	1	0	0	5	0	1+1	1
39	MF	(Brazil) BRA	Tiago	9	0	0+1	0	4+1	0	1	0	1+1	0
40	MF	(Brazil) BRA	Jeferson Forneck	4	0	0+1	0	0+3	0	0	0	0	0
50	MF	(Brazil) BRA	Zortea	5	0	1+4	0	0	0	0	0	0	0
65	MF	(Brazil) BRA	Riquelme	8	0	0+3	0	0+2	0	0	0	1+2	0
Forwards
7	FW	(Argentina) ARG	Cristian Pavon	47	5	26+3	3	5+1	0	5	1	7	1
9	FW	(Ghana) GHA	Francis Amuzu	51	9	23+6	2	7+2	3	6+1	2	4+2	2
11	FW	(Brazil) BRA	Tetê	44	4	14+13	2	3+2	1	1+4	0	6+1	1
22	FW	(Denmark) DEN	Martin Braithwaite	39	5	6+19	1	0	0	1+5	2	6+2	2
30	FW	(Brazil) BRA	Matheus Nascimento	5	0	0+3	0	0	0	0	0	0+2	0
47	FW	(Brazil) BRA	Roger	8	1	0+2	0	4+2	1	0	0	0	0
77	FW	(Cape Verde) CPV	Jovane Cabral	9	1	3+3	1	0	0	1+2	0	0	0
95	FW	(Brazil) BRA	Carlos Vinícius	54	22	30+2	11	8+3	5	6	4	3+2	2
99	FW	(Colombia) COL	José Enamorado	49	1	12+17	0	3+4	1	3+3	0	3+4	0
Players transferred/loaned out during the season
1	GK	(Brazil) BRA	Tiago Volpi	1	0	0	0	1	0	0	0	0	0
6	MF	(Colombia) COL	Gustavo Cuéllar	1	0	0	0	1	0	0	0	0	0
8	MF	(Brazil) BRA	Arthur	23	1	8+2	0	7+1	1	1	0	1+3	0
8	MF	(Brazil) BRA	Edenilson	7	3	2+1	1	2+2	2	0	0	0	0
10	MF	(Brazil) BRA	Willian	22	1	2+7	0	5+5	0	0+1	1	2	0
10	MF	(Argentina) ARG	Franco Cristaldo	5	1	0	0	3+2	1	0	0	0	0
11	MF	(Colombia) COL	Miguel Monsalve	13	1	5+2	0	2+1	1	0	0	0+3	0
16	FW	(Chile) CHI	Alexander Aravena	4	0	0	0	1+3	0	0	0	0	0
33	MF	(Argentina) ARG	Leonel Pérez	19	0	8+4	0	0	0	0+2	0	5	0
37	MF	(Brazil) BRA	Gabriel Mec	32	3	7+9	2	1+5	0	2	0	4+4	1
44	DF	(Brazil) BRA	Viery	27	2	13	1	7	1	2	0	5	0
77	FW	(Brazil) BRA	André Henrique	13	0	0+5	0	3+3	0	0+1	0	0+1	0

Last updated: 4 November 2026
Source: Competitions

=== Goalscorers ===
As of 18 November 2026

Rank	No.	Pos.	Nat.	Player	Campeonato Brasileiro	Campeonato Gaúcho	Copa do Brasil	Copa Sudamericana	Total
1	95	FW	(Brazil)	Carlos Vinícius	11	5	5	2	23
2	9	FW	(Ghana)	Francis Amuzu	2	3	2	2	9
3	7	FW	(Argentina)	Cristian Pavon	3	0	1	1	5
3	22	FW	(Denmark)	Martin Braithwaite	1	0	2	2	5
5	6	DF	(Brazil)	Gustavo Martins	3	1	0	0	4
5	11	FW	(Brazil)	Tetê	2	1	0	1	4
7	37	MF	(Brazil)	Gabriel Mec	2	0	0	1	3
7	—	MF	(Brazil)	Edenilson	1	2	0	0	3
9	8	MF	(Peru)	Erick Noriega	1	0	1	0	2
9	20	MF	(Paraguay)	Mathías Villasanti	1	0	0	1	2
9	23	DF	(Brazil)	Marlon	2	0	0	0	2
9	44	DF	(Brazil)	Viery	1	1	0	0	2
9	82	DF	(Brazil)	Wallace	2	0	0	0	2
14	2	DF	(Paraguay)	Fabián Balbuena	1	0	0	0	1
14	3	DF	(Brazil)	Wagner Leonardo	0	1	0	0	1
14	4	DF	(Argentina)	Walter Kannemann	1	0	0	0	1
14	5	MF	(Argentina)	Juan Nardoni	1	0	0	0	1
14	10	MF	(Croatia)	Filip Krovinović	0	0	1	0	1
14	27	DF	(Brazil)	Diego Caito	1	0	0	0	1
14	47	FW	(Brazil)	Roger	0	1	0	0	1
14	77	FW	(Cape Verde)	Jovane Cabral	1	0	0	0	1
14	99	FW	(Colombia)	José Enamorado	0	1	0	0	1
14	—	MF	(Brazil)	Arthur	0	1	0	0	1
14	—	MF	(Argentina)	Franco Cristaldo	0	1	0	0	1
14	—	MF	(Colombia)	Miguel Monsalve	0	1	0	0	1
14	—	MF	(Brazil)	Willian	0	0	1	0	1
Own goals					1	2	0	0	3
Totals					38	21	13	10	82
