= Gabriel Menegon =

Brazilian footballer (born 2008)

Personal information
- Full name: Gabriel Otávio Menegon
- Date of birth: 14 October 2008 (age 18)
- Place of birth: Sapiranga, Brazil
- Height: 1.96 m (6 ft 5 in)
- Position: Goalkeeper

Team information
- Current team: Grêmio
- Number: 31

Youth career
- 2019–2026: Grêmio

Senior career*
Years	Team	Apps	(Gls)
2026–	Grêmio	1	(0)

International career
2025	Brazil U17	2	(0)
- * Club domestic league appearances and goals as of 20:00, 1 June 2026 (UTC)

Gabriel Otávio Menegon (born 14 October 2008) is a Brazilian professional footballer who plays as a goalkeeper for Campeonato Brasileiro Série A club Grêmio.

== Club career ==
Born in Sapiranga, Rio Grande do Sul, Menegon joined Grêmio's youth sides in June 2019, aged ten. In October 2025, he renewed his contract until 2028.

In March 2026, Menegon was promoted to the first team, being a fourth-choice behind Weverton, Gabriel Grando and Thiago Beltrame. On 30 May 2026, with Weverton on international duty and Grando injured, he made his senior – and Série A – debut, coming on as a late substitute for Carlos Vinícius in a 3–1 home loss to Corinthians, as Beltrame was sent off.

== International career ==
On 30 May 2025, Menegon was called up to the Brazil national under-17 team.

== Career statistics ==
As of 1 June 2026

Appearances and goals by club, season and competition
Club	Season	League			State league (Note: Includes Campeonato Gaúcho)		Copa do Brasil		Continental		Other		Total	
Club	Season	Division	Apps	Goals	Apps	Goals	Apps	Goals	Apps	Goals	Apps	Goals	Apps	Goals
Grêmio	2026	Série A	1	0	0	0	0	0	0	0	—		1	0
Career total			1	0	0	0	0	0	0	0	0	0	1	0

== Honours ==
Grêmio

- Campeonato Gaúcho: 2026
