= Tiaguinho (footballer, born 2008) =

Brazilian footballer

Personal information
- Full name: Tiago Augusto Gonçalves
- Date of birth: 2 February 2008 (age 18)
- Place of birth: Joinville, Brazil
- Height: 1.76 m (5 ft 9 in)
- Position: Midfielder

Team information
- Current team: Grêmio
- Number: 39

Youth career
- 2018–2025: Grêmio

Senior career*
Years	Team	Apps	(Gls)
2026–	Grêmio	6	(0)

International career^{‡}
2023–2024	Brazil U15		
2025	Brazil U17	16	(1)
2026–	Brazil U20	1	(0)
- * Club domestic league appearances and goals as of 15:03, 12 May 2026 (UTC) ‡ National team caps and goals as of 15:03, 12 May 2026 (UTC)

Tiago Augusto Gonçalves (born 2 February 2008), known as Tiaguinho or just Tiago, is a Brazilian professional footballer who plays as a midfielder for Campeonato Brasileiro Série A club Grêmio.

== Club career ==
Born in Joinville, Santa Catarina, Tiaguinho joined Grêmio's youth sides in 2018, aged nine. In July 2024, he signed his first professional contract with the club, agreeing to a three-year deal.

In December 2025, Tiaguinho was promoted to the first team ahead of the upcoming season. He made his senior debut on 10 January 2026, starting in a 4–0 Campeonato Gaúcho away routing of Avenida and providing the assist to Francis Amuzu's opener.

Tiaguinho lost space in the end of January 2026, and only featured in a single match in March before returning to the fields in May, after the injuries of Arthur and Juan Nardoni.

== International career ==
In March 2025, Tiaguinho and other two Grêmio players were called up to the Brazil national under-17 team for the 2025 South American U-17 Championship. He was also included in the squad for the 2025 FIFA U-17 World Cup, where he gained notoriety after scoring a panenka in the penalty shoot-out against Paraguay in the round of 32.

On 13 March 2026, Tiaguinho was called up to the under-20 team for two friendlies against Paraguay.

== Career statistics ==
As of 12 May 2026

Appearances and goals by club, season and competition
Club	Season	League			State League		National Cup		Continental		Other		Total	
Club	Season	Division	Apps	Goals	Apps	Goals	Apps	Goals	Apps	Goals	Apps	Goals	Apps	Goals
Grêmio	2024	Série A	0	0	—		0	0	—		2 (Note: Appearance(s) in Copa FGF)	0	2	0
Grêmio	2025	Série A	0	0	—		0	0	—		—		0	0
Grêmio	2026	Série A	1	0	5	0	0	0	1 (Note: Appearance(s) in Copa Sudamericana)	0	—		7	0
Career total			1	0	5	0	0	0	1	0	2	0	9	0

== Honours ==
Grêmio

- Campeonato Gaúcho: 2026

Brazil U17

- South American U-17 Championship: 2025
