= Thiago Beltrame =

Brazilian footballer (born 2003)

Personal information
- Full name: Thiago Beltrame Stallbaum
- Date of birth: 2 July 2003 (age 23)
- Place of birth: Canoas, Brazil
- Height: 2.01 m (6 ft 7 in)
- Position: Goalkeeper

Team information
- Current team: Grêmio
- Number: 24

Youth career
- 2013–2015: Grêmio
- 2018–2025: Grêmio

Senior career*
Years	Team	Apps	(Gls)
2023–	Grêmio	1	(0)
- * Club domestic league appearances and goals as of 19:45, 1 June 2026 (UTC)

Thiago Beltrame Stallbaum (born 2 July 2003) is a Brazilian professional footballer who plays as a goalkeeper for Campeonato Brasileiro Série A club Grêmio.

== Club career ==
Born in Canoas, Rio Grande do Sul, Beltrame joined Grêmio's youth sides in 2013, aged nine. He left at the end of the 2015 season, returning in 2018, before making his senior debut with the B-team in the 2023 Copa FGF.

Beltrame was promoted to the main squad ahead of the 2024 season, mainly as a fifth-choice behind Agustín Marchesín, Rafael Cabral, Caíque and Felipe Scheibig. He remained a backup option in the following year, behind Tiago Volpi, Gabriel Grando and Jorge.

In the 2026 campaign, Beltrame was a third-choice behind Weverton and Grando, but was handed his professional debut on 30 May of that year, as Weverton was away on international duty and Grando was injured; he started and was sent off in a 3–1 Série A home loss to Corinthians.

== International career ==
In February 2021, Beltrame and other two Grêmio teammates were called up to the Brazil national under-18 team.

== Career statistics ==
As of 1 June 2026

Appearances and goals by club, season and competition
Club	Season	League			State league (Note: Includes Campeonato Gaúcho)		Copa do Brasil		Continental		Other		Total	
Club	Season	Division	Apps	Goals	Apps	Goals	Apps	Goals	Apps	Goals	Apps	Goals	Apps	Goals
Grêmio	2023	Série A	—		—		—		—		3 (Note: Appearance(s) in Copa FGF)	0	3	0
Grêmio	2024	Série A	0	0	0	0	0	0	0	0	4	0	4	0
Grêmio	2025	Série A	0	0	0	0	0	0	0	0	—		0	0
Grêmio	2026	Série A	1	0	0	0	0	0	0	0	—		1	0
Career total			1	0	0	0	0	0	0	0	7	0	8	0

== Honours ==
Grêmio

- Campeonato Gaúcho: 2024, 2026
