= Jeferson Forneck =

Brazilian footballer (born 2006)

Personal information
- Full name: Jeferson Forneck
- Date of birth: 14 December 2006 (age 19)
- Place of birth: São Pedro da Serra, Brazil
- Position: Attacking midfielder

Team information
- Current team: Grêmio
- Number: 40

Youth career
- 2017–: Grêmio

Senior career*
Years	Team	Apps	(Gls)
2026–	Grêmio	4	(0)

International career
2022	Brazil U17	1	(1)
- * Club domestic league appearances and goals as of 15:48, 26 February 2026 (UTC)

Jeferson Forneck (born 14 December 2006), sometimes known as Jefinho, is a Brazilian professional footballer who plays as an attacking midfielder for Campeonato Brasileiro Série A club Grêmio.

== Club career ==
Born in São Pedro da Serra, Rio Grande do Sul, Jeferson joined Grêmio's youth sides in 2017, aged ten. On 17 December 2022, he signed his first professional contract with the club, agreeing to a three-year deal.

Jeferson struggled with injuries in the following years, but still renewed his link until 2027 on 14 December 2025, after fully recovering. He was promoted to the first team ahead of the 2026 season, and made his professional debut on 21 January of that year, coming on as a second-half substitute for Dodi in a 2–0 Campeonato Gaúcho away win over Guarany de Bagé.

== International career ==
In November 2022, Jeferson debuted for the Brazil national under-17 team by scoring in a friendly match against Chile.

== Career statistics ==
As of 26 February 2026

Appearances and goals by club, season and competition
Club	Season	League			State league (Note: Includes Campeonato Gaúcho)		Copa do Brasil		Continental		Other		Total	
Club	Season	Division	Apps	Goals	Apps	Goals	Apps	Goals	Apps	Goals	Apps	Goals	Apps	Goals
Grêmio	2023	Série A	—		—		—		—		3 (Note: Appearance(s) in Copa FGF)	1	3	1
Grêmio	2026	Série A	1	0	3	0	0	0	0	0	—		4	0
Career total			1	0	3	0	0	0	0	0	3	1	7	1

== Honours ==
Grêmio

- Campeonato Gaúcho: 2026
