= Pedro Gabriel =

Brazilian footballer (born 2006)

Personal information
- Full name: Pedro Gabriel Crisostomo Pinheiro
- Date of birth: 6 June 2007 (age 19)
- Place of birth: Fortaleza, Brazil
- Position: Left-back

Team information
- Current team: Grêmio
- Number: 54

Youth career
- 2021–: Grêmio

Senior career*
Years	Team	Apps	(Gls)
2025–	Grêmio	4	(0)
- * Club domestic league appearances and goals as of 21:16, 6 April 2026 (UTC)

Pedro Gabriel Crisostomo Pinheiro (born 6 June 2007), known as Pedro Gabriel, is a Brazilian professional footballer who plays as a left-back for Campeonato Brasileiro Série A club Grêmio.

== Career ==
Born in Fortaleza, Ceará, Pedro Gabriel joined Grêmio's youth sides at the age of 14, and signed his first professional contract with the club in July 2023. In January 2025, he was called up to the first team by head coach Gustavo Quinteros, and made his senior debut late in that month, coming on as a late substitute for fellow youth graduate Viery in a 3–0 Campeonato Gaúcho away win over Monsoon.

After a further appearance with the main squad, Pedro Gabriel returned to the under-20s, and renewed his link until 2029 in February 2026. He made his Série A debut on 2 April of that year, starting in a 2–1 away loss to Palmeiras.

== Career statistics ==
As of 6 April 2026

Appearances and goals by club, season and competition
Club	Season	League			State league (Note: Includes Campeonato Gaúcho)		Copa do Brasil		Continental		Other		Total	
Club	Season	Division	Apps	Goals	Apps	Goals	Apps	Goals	Apps	Goals	Apps	Goals	Apps	Goals
Grêmio	2025	Série A	0	0	2	0	0	0	—		—		2	0
Grêmio	2026	Série A	2	0	—		0	0	0	0	—		2	0
Career total			2	0	2	0	0	0	0	0	0	0	4	0
