= Roger (footballer, born 2008) =

Brazilian footballer (born 2008)

Personal information
- Full name: Roger Dias Fernandes
- Date of birth: 29 April 2008 (age 18)
- Place of birth: Santa Maria, Brazil
- Position: Attacking midfielder

Team information
- Current team: Grêmio
- Number: 47

Youth career
- 2019–2026: Grêmio

Senior career*
Years	Team	Apps	(Gls)
2026–	Grêmio	7	(1)

International career
2023	Brazil U15		
- * Club domestic league appearances and goals as of 16:02, 26 February 2026 (UTC)

Roger Dias Fernandes (born 29 April 2008), simply known as Roger, is a Brazilian professional footballer who plays as an attacking midfielder for Campeonato Brasileiro Série A club Grêmio.

== Club career ==
Born in Santa Maria but raised in São Jerônimo, Rio Grande do Sul, Roger joined Grêmio's youth sides in January 2019, aged ten. On 9 July 2024, he signed his first professional contract with the club, agreeing to a deal until May 2027.

Promoted to the first team ahead of the 2026 season, Roger made his professional debut on 10 January of that year, starting and scoring his team's third in a 4–0 Campeonato Gaúcho away routing of Avenida; he also provided an assist to Wagner Leonardo's second goal. Ten days later, he renewed his link until December 2028.

== International career ==
In August 2023, Roger was called up to the Brazil national under-15 team.

== Career statistics ==
As of 26 February 2026

Appearances and goals by club, season and competition
Club	Season	League			State league (Note: Includes Campeonato Gaúcho)		Copa do Brasil		Continental		Other		Total	
Club	Season	Division	Apps	Goals	Apps	Goals	Apps	Goals	Apps	Goals	Apps	Goals	Apps	Goals
Grêmio	2024	Série A	—		—		—		—		1 (Note: Appearance(s) in Copa FGF)	0	1	0
Grêmio	2026	Série A	1	0	6	1	0	0	0	0	—		7	1
Career total			1	0	6	1	0	0	0	0	1	0	8	1

== Honours ==
Grêmio

- Campeonato Gaúcho: 2026
