= Bernardo Zortea =

Brazilian footballer (born 2007)

Zortea
Personal information
- Full name: Bernardo Schons Zortea
- Date of birth: 21 March 2007 (age 19)
- Place of birth: Pinhalzinho, Brazil
- Position: Central midfielder

Team information
- Current team: Grêmio
- Number: 50

Youth career
- 2018–2022: Chapecoense
- 2022–: Grêmio

Senior career*
Years	Team	Apps	(Gls)
2026–	Grêmio	2	(0)

International career
2024	Brazil U17	3	(0)
- * Club domestic league appearances and goals as of 21:02, 6 April 2026 (UTC)

Bernardo Schons Zortea (born 21 March 2007), commonly known as Zortea, is a Brazilian professional footballer who plays as a central midfielder for Campeonato Brasileiro Série A club Grêmio.

== Club career ==
Born in Pinhalzinho, Santa Catarina, Zortea joined Grêmio's youth sides in March 2022, from Chapecoense. In November 2025, already established as a regular member of the under-20 team, he renewed his contract with the former until the end of 2027.

In March 2026, Zortea was promoted to the first team of Tricolor by head coach Luís Castro. He made his first team – and Série A – debut on 2 April, coming on as a late substitute for Juan Nardoni in a 2–1 away loss to Palmeiras.

== International career ==
On 24 June 2024, Zortea was called up to the Brazil national under-17 team for the Cascais Luso Cup.

== Career statistics ==
As of 6 April 2026

Appearances and goals by club, season and competition
Club	Season	League			State league		Copa do Brasil		Continental		Other		Total	
Club	Season	Division	Apps	Goals	Apps	Goals	Apps	Goals	Apps	Goals	Apps	Goals	Apps	Goals
Grêmio	2025	Série A	0	0	—		0	0	—		4 (Note: Appearance(s) in Copa FGF)	0	4	0
Grêmio	2026	Série A	2	0	—		0	0	0	0	—		2	0
Career total			2	0	0	0	0	0	0	0	4	0	6	0

== Honours ==
Brazil U17

- Cascais Luso Cup: 2024
