= Riquelme (footballer, born August 2006) =

Brazilian footballer

Personal information
- Full name: Riquelme Freitas dos Santos
- Date of birth: 13 August 2006 (age 20)
- Place of birth: São Paulo, Brazil
- Height: 1.77 m (5 ft 10 in)
- Position: Midfielder

Team information
- Current team: Grêmio
- Number: 65

Youth career
- Comercial do Tietê
- 2012–: Grêmio

Senior career*
Years	Team	Apps	(Gls)
2024–	Grêmio	10	(0)
- * Club domestic league appearances and goals as of 14 December 2025

Riquelme Freitas dos Santos (born 13 August 2006), simply known as Riquelme, is a Brazilian professional footballer who plays as a midfielder for Grêmio.

== Career ==
Born in São Paulo, Riquelme joined Grêmio's youth sides in the end of 2011, after being spotted in the neighbourhood of Pirituba; his economic rights were assigned to Comercial do Tietê at that time. He made his first team debut on 2 April 2024, coming on as a second-half substitute for fellow youth graduate Nathan Fernandes in a 2–0 away loss to The Strongest, for the year's Copa Libertadores.

On 12 October 2024, Riquelme renewed his contract until 2026. He was regularly used with the under-20s before making another appearance with the main squad on 29 May 2025, where he came on and scored the winner in a 1–0 Copa Sudamericana home success over Sportivo Luqueño. After that match, he started to appear more regularly in the first team under head coach Mano Menezes.

== Career statistics ==
As of 5 August 2025.

Appearances and goals by club, season and competition
Club	Season	League			State League		National Cup		Continental		Other		Total	
Club	Season	Division	Apps	Goals	Apps	Goals	Apps	Goals	Apps	Goals	Apps	Goals	Apps	Goals
Grêmio	2024	Série A	0	0	—		0	0	1 (Note: Appearance(s) in Copa Libertadores)	0	3 (Note: Appearance(s) in Copa FGF)	0	4	0
Grêmio	2025	Série A	6	0	—		0	0	2 (Note: Appearance(s) in Copa Sudamericana)	1	0	0	8	1
Career total			6	0	0	0	0	0	3	1	3	0	12	1

== Honours ==
Grêmio

- Campeonato Gaúcho: 2026
- Recopa Gaúcha: 2025
