= Arthur Melo =

Brazilian footballer (born 1996)

Arthur
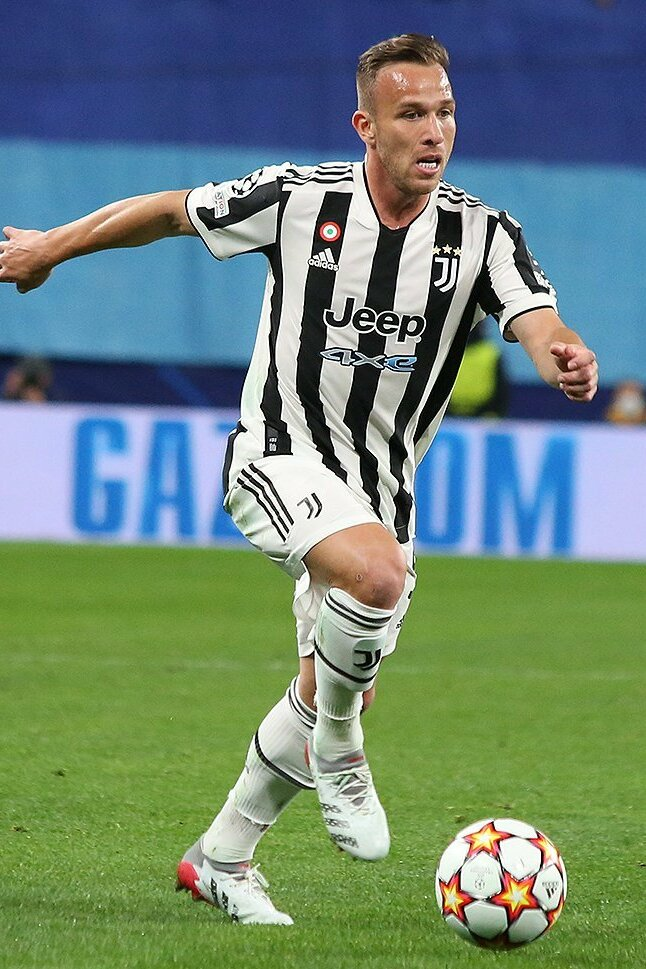
- Arthur playing for Juventus in 2021

Personal information
- Full name: Arthur Henrique Ramos de Oliveira Melo
- Date of birth: 12 August 1996 (age 30)
- Place of birth: Goiânia, Brazil
- Height: 1.71 m (5 ft 7 in)
- Position: Midfielder

Team information
- Current team: Santos
- Number: 6

Youth career
- 2008–2010: Goiás
- 2010–2015: Grêmio

Senior career*
Years	Team	Apps	(Gls)
2015–2018	Grêmio	47	(5)
2018–2020	Barcelona	48	(3)
2020–2026	Juventus	42	(1)
2022–2023	→ Liverpool (loan)	0	(0)
2023–2024	→ Fiorentina (loan)	33	(2)
2025	→ Girona (loan)	15	(0)
2025–2026	→ Grêmio (loan)	31	(1)
2026–	Santos	6	(0)

International career^{‡}
2013	Brazil U17	7	(1)
2018–2022	Brazil	22	(1)
Medal record
Men's football
Representing Brazil
Copa América
Winner	2019 Brazil
- * Club domestic league appearances and goals as of 13:16, 18 November 2026 (UTC) ‡ National team caps and goals as of 29 March 2022 (UTC)

Arthur Henrique Ramos de Oliveira Melo (born 12 August 1996), known as Arthur or Arthur Melo, is a Brazilian professional footballer who plays as a midfielder for Campeonato Brasileiro Série A club Santos.

Born in Goiânia, Arthur began his career with Grêmio, and won the Copa Libertadores in 2017. He signed for Barcelona for an initial fee of €31 million in 2018. Arthur joined Italian club Juventus in 2020. He was loaned out to Liverpool in the 2022–23 season, only making one appearance for the club. The following season he was loaned to Fiorentina.

Arthur made his senior debut for Brazil in 2018 after previously being capped by Brazil youth team at under-17 level. He was later part of the squad that won the 2019 Copa América.

== Club career ==
=== Grêmio ===
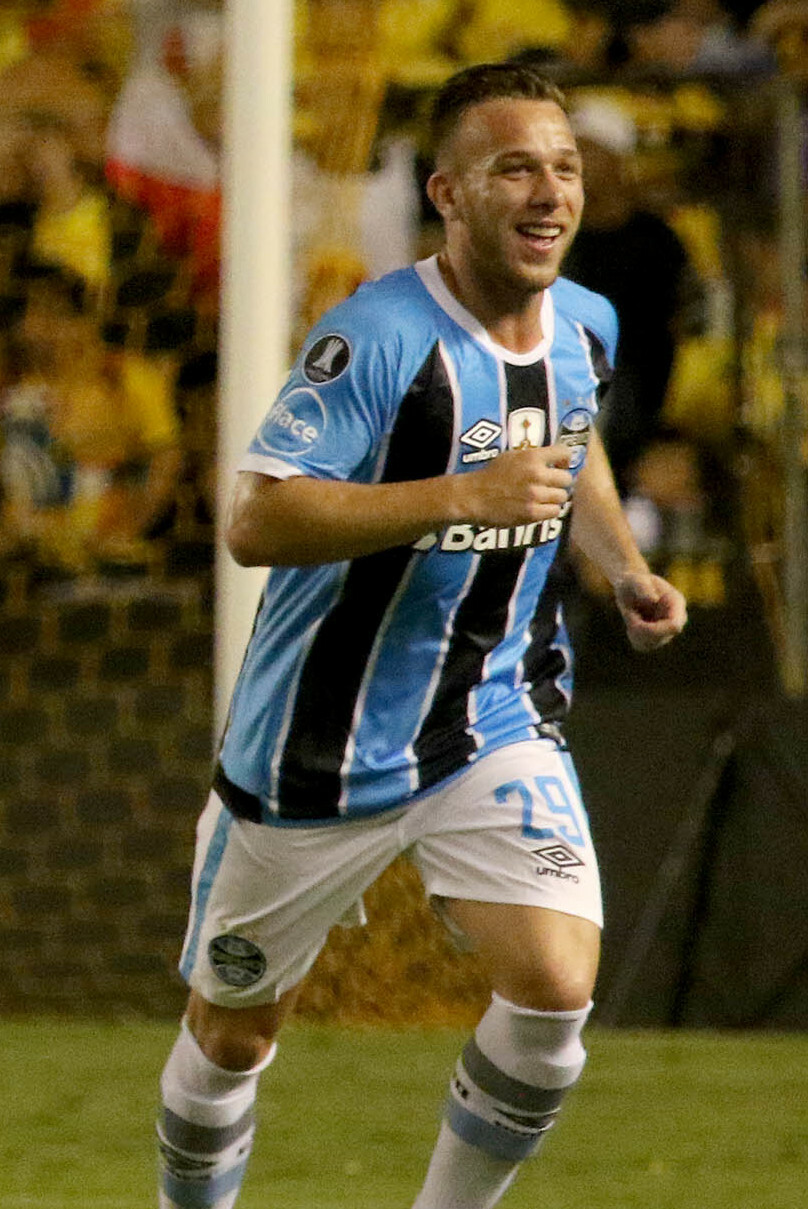
Arthur playing for Grêmio in 2017

Arthur began his career with his hometown club Goiás aged 12. In 2010, after being spotted in a youth tournament, he moved to Grêmio.

In January 2015, following Arthur's impressive performances at the Copa São Paulo de Futebol Júnior, he was promoted from Grêmio's youth team under first-team manager Luiz Felipe Scolari. He unexpectedly started in his first team debut, against Aimoré for the Campeonato Gaúcho. However, he was substituted at half-time by Argentine full-back Matías Rodríguez and made no more senior appearances that season. In 2016, Arthur made his league debut in the last match of the season, a 1–0 home loss against Botafogo, replacing Kaio in the second half.

In 2017, Arthur become a first-team regular after a string of good performances in Primeira Liga and Campeonato Gaúcho. In his Copa Libertadores debut, a 1–1 away draw against Club Guaraní, he was named man-of-the-match after completing 40 passes, with an impressive 100% success rate. His playing style and build earned drawn comparisons with Spanish midfielders Andrés Iniesta and Thiago Alcântara, and attracted interest from European clubs such as Chelsea, Barcelona and Atlético Madrid. In May, Arthur scored his first professional goal, the opener in a 3–1 victory against Fluminense for the Copa do Brasil. In July, he scored his first league goal, the second in a 3–1 away victory against Vitória. In November, was elected by Conmebol the man of match in the second leg of the Copa Libertadores final against Lanús, despite playing only 50 minutes due to an injury.

=== Barcelona ===
On 11 March 2018, Barcelona reached an agreement with Grêmio for the transfer of Arthur. The Catalans agreed to pay an initial fee of €31 million plus €9 million in added variables. Arthur signed a six-year contract and was officially announced as a Barça player on 9 July 2018. On 28 July, Arthur scored a goal on his debut against Tottenham Hotspur in a pre-season friendly match.

Arthur made his competitive debut at the 2018 Supercopa de España on 12 August, in which Barcelona won 2–1 over Sevilla. Arthur made his league debut during the first league match of the season, also registering his first assist for the club in a 3–0 win against Alavés. On 31 August, Arthur scored his first goal for Barcelona in 2–2 away draw against Osasuna.

=== Juventus ===
On 29 June 2020, Barcelona announced that they had reached an agreement with Juventus for the transfer of Arthur on a five-year contract for €72 million, plus €10 million in variables; the deal was also coordinated with a swap of Miralem Pjanić. He made his club and Serie A debut on 27 September, coming on as substitute in a 2–2 away draw against Roma.

==== Loan to Liverpool ====
On 1 September 2022, Liverpool announced the loan signing of Arthur. Juventus specified that Liverpool had paid €4.5 million in loan fees, with an option to purchase the player for €37.5 million at the end of the one-year loan.

Arthur made his Liverpool debut in a 4–1 UEFA Champions League defeat to Napoli on 7 September 2022. However, his experience at the club was blighted by physical condition problems after having been forced to train alone while he was at Juventus. He returned to Italy at the end of his loan spell having made just one substitute appearance totalling 13 minutes all season.

==== Loan to Fiorentina ====
On 22 July 2023, Arthur joined Serie A club Fiorentina on loan. On 29 May, he started in Fiorentina's 1–0 extra-time defeat to Olympiacos in the 2024 UEFA Conference League final.

==== Loan to Girona ====
On 1 February 2025, Arthur joined Spanish club Girona for the remainder of the 2024–25 season.

==== Loan to Grêmio ====
He returned to Grêmio on loan for the 2025 and 2026 seasons.

==== Return to Juventus and contract termination ====
Arthur rejoined Juventus in summer 2026, ahead of their 2026–27 season; however on 21 August 2026, Juventus terminated his contract.

=== Santos ===
On 31 August 2026, Arthur was announced at Santos on a contract until December. He made his club debut on 6 September, replacing Gustavo Caballero in a 3–2 away win over Internacional.

== International career ==
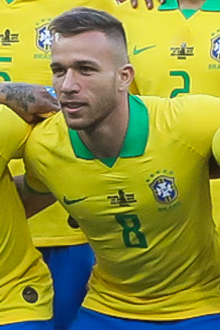
Arthur with the Brazil national team in the 2019 Copa América Final

Arthur has represented Brazil in under-17 level. He was part of the Brazil under-17 squad selected to play in the 2013 South American Under-17 Football Championship.

On 15 September 2017, Arthur received his first senior call-up to the Brazil squad to face Bolivia and Chile for the 2018 FIFA World Cup qualification. In May 2018, he was named in the standby list for the 2018 FIFA World Cup.

He made his international debut against United States in a 2–0 friendly win on 7 September 2018 coming on as a substitute. The Brazilian's first start was against El Salvador in a 5–0 win on 12 September. Tite praised the midfielder's playing style saying, "He always finds the best escape, the best pass out. Even if he doesn't provide the assist, he comes up with the pass that will help a player."

In May 2019, Arthur was included in Brazil's 23-man squad for the 2019 Copa América on home soil. In the 2019 Copa América Final against hosts Peru on 7 July, at the Maracanã Stadium, Arthur assisted Gabriel Jesus's match-winning goal towards the end of the first half; the match eventually ended in a 3–1 victory to Brazil.

Arthur scored his first senior international goal for Brazil on 17 November 2020, the opener in an eventual 2–0 away win over Uruguay in a 2022 FIFA World Cup qualifier.

== Style of play ==
"Arthur can mark an era at Barcelona."

— Former Barcelona midfielder Xavi on Arthur

Arthur is capable of playing as a deep-lying playmaker, central midfielder, box-to-box midfielder, and occasionally also as a holding midfielder. His agility, technical ability, dribbling and movement – both on and off the ball – allow him to create space and control the flow of play in midfield, whilst his exceptional vision, playmaking ability, and precise passing allow him to retain possession, create chances, and make decisive passes for teammates. In 2020, former midfielder Enzo Maresca stated that he felt Arthur was best suited to the roles of either an attacking midfielder or a mezzala.

== Career statistics ==
=== Club ===
As of match played 18 November 2026

Appearances and goals by club, season and competition
Club	Season	League			State league (Note: Includes Campeonato Gaúcho)		National cup (Note: Includes Copa do Brasil, Copa del Rey, Coppa Italia)		Continental		Other		Total	
Club	Season	Division	Apps	Goals	Apps	Goals	Apps	Goals	Apps	Goals	Apps	Goals	Apps	Goals
Grêmio	2015	Série A	0	0	1	0	0	0	—		—		1	0
Grêmio	2016	Série A	1	0	0	0	—		0	0	—		1	0
Grêmio	2017	Série A	27	1	4	0	5	1	12 (Note: Appearances in Copa Libertadores)	0	2 (Note: Appearances in Primeira Liga)	0	50	2
Grêmio	2018	Série A	7	1	7	3	1	0	3	0	—		18	4
Grêmio	Total		35	2	12	3	6	1	15	0	2	0	70	6
Barcelona	2018–19	La Liga	27	0	—		7	0	9 (Note: Appearance(s) in UEFA Champions League)	0	1 (Note: Appearance in Supercopa de España)	0	44	0
Barcelona	2019–20	La Liga	21	3	—		3	1	4	0	0	0	28	4
Barcelona	Total		48	3	—		10	1	13	0	1	0	72	4
Juventus	2020–21	Serie A	22	1	—		2	0	7	0	1 (Note: Appearance in Supercoppa Italiana)	0	32	1
Juventus	2021–22	Serie A	20	0	—		4	0	6	0	1	0	31	0
Juventus	Total		42	1	—		6	0	13	0	2	0	63	1
Liverpool (loan)	2022–23	Premier League	0	0	—		0	0	1	0	—		1	0
Fiorentina (loan)	2023–24	Serie A	33	2	—		3	0	11 (Note: Appearances in UEFA Europa Conference League)	0	1 (Note: Appearance in Supercoppa Italiana)	0	48	2
Girona (loan)	2024–25	La Liga	15	0	—		—		—		—		15	0
Grêmio (loan)	2025	Série A	13	0	—		—		—		—		13	0
Grêmio (loan)	2026	Série A	10	0	8	1	1	0	4 (Note: Appearances in Copa Sudamericana)	0	—		23	1
Grêmio (loan)	Total		23	0	8	1	1	0	4	0	—		36	1
Santos	2026	Série A	6	0	—		—		2	0	—		8	0
Career total			202	8	21	4	26	2	59	0	7	0	314	14

=== International ===
As of match played 29 March 2022

Appearances and goals by national team and year
National team	Year	Apps	Goals
Brazil	2018	6	0
Brazil	2019	14	0
Brazil	2020	1	1
Brazil	2022	1	0
Total		22	1

Scores and results list Brazil's goal tally first, score column indicates score after each Melo goal.

List of international goals scored by Arthur Melo
No.	Date	Venue	Cap	Opponent	Score	Result	Competition	Ref.
1	17 November 2020	Estadio Centenario, Montevideo, Uruguay	21	Uruguay	1–0	2–0	2022 FIFA World Cup qualification	

== Honours ==
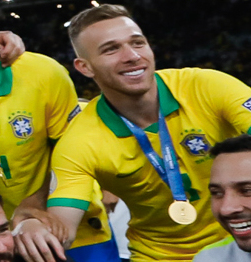
Arthur celebrating the 2019 Copa América title

Grêmio

- Copa do Brasil: 2016
- Copa Libertadores: 2017
- Recopa Sudamericana 2018
- Campeonato Gaúcho: 2018, 2019, 2026

Barcelona

- La Liga: 2018–19
- Supercopa de España: 2018

Juventus

- Coppa Italia: 2020–21
- Supercoppa Italiana: 2020

Brazil

- Copa América: 2019

Individual

- Campeonato Brasileiro Série A Team of the Year: 2017
- Campeonato Brasileiro Série A Best Newcomer: 2017
- Copa América Team of the Tournament: 2019
