= Vitor Ramon =

Brazilian footballer (born 2007)

Personal information
- Full name: Vitor Ramon Ribeiro de Oliveira
- Date of birth: 15 January 2008 (age 18)
- Place of birth: Rio de Janeiro, Brazil
- Position: Right-back

Team information
- Current team: Grêmio
- Number: 32

Youth career
- 2018–2020: Campo Grande
- 2021–: Grêmio

Senior career*
Years	Team	Apps	(Gls)
2026–	Grêmio	1	(0)
- * Club domestic league appearances and goals as of 23:06, 17 May 2026 (UTC)

Vitor Ramon Ribeiro de Oliveira (born 15 January 2008), known as Vitor Ramon, is a Brazilian professional footballer who plays as a right-back for Campeonato Brasileiro Série A club Grêmio.

== Career ==
Born in Rio de Janeiro, Vitor Ramon joined Grêmio's youth sides in 2021, aged 13. He renewed his contract until 2028 in December 2025, and was promoted to the first team the following January.

Vitor Ramon made his senior – and Série A – debut on 17 May 2026, coming on as a second-half substiute for Marcos Rocha in a 1–1 away draw against Bahia.

== Career statistics ==
As of match played 17 May 2026

Appearances and goals by club, season and competition
Club	Season	League			State league		Copa do Brasil		Continental		Other		Total	
Club	Season	Division	Apps	Goals	Apps	Goals	Apps	Goals	Apps	Goals	Apps	Goals	Apps	Goals
Grêmio	2026	Série A	1	0	0	0	0	0	0	0	—		1	0
Career total			1	0	0	0	0	0	0	0	0	0	1	0
