= Wallace (footballer, born 2004) =

Brazilian footballer (born 2004)

Personal information
- Full name: Wallace Gomes da Silva Santos
- Date of birth: 6 December 2004 (age 21)
- Place of birth: Rio de Janeiro, Brazil
- Height: 1.90 m (6 ft 3 in)
- Position: Centre-back

Team information
- Current team: Grêmio
- Number: 82

Youth career
- 2022: Cabofriense
- 2022–2024: CRB

Senior career*
| Years | Team | Apps | (Gls) |
| 2023 | CRB B | 9 | (1) |
| 2023–2026 | CRB | 17 | (0) |
| 2026– | Grêmio | 0 | (0) |
- * Club domestic league appearances and goals as of 13:11, 13 July 2026 (UTC)

Wallace Gomes da Silva Santos (born 6 December 2004), simply known as Wallace, is a Brazilian professional footballer who plays as a centre-back for Campeonato Brasileiro Série A club Grêmio.

== Career ==
=== CRB ===
Born in Rio de Janeiro, Wallace joined CRB's youth sides in 2022, from Cabofriense. He made his senior debut with the club on 21 January of that year, coming on as a second-half substitute in a 3–0 Copa Alagoas home win over Dínamo, as CRB were using their under-20 squad in the competition.

Wallace then ended the 2023 season playing with CRB's B-team in the Campeonato Alagoano Second Division, before returning to the under-20s in the following year, while also featuring sporadically with the main squad. His first appearance with the full side occurred on 25 February 2024, as he started in a 1–0 Campeonato Alagoano away win over Coruripe.

A backup for most of the 2025 campaign, Wallace made his Série B debut on 15 November of that year, replacing Fábio Alemão late into a 2–0 home success over Vila Nova. In the following season, he started to feature more regularly for CRB and helped them to win the third consecutive Alagoano title, featuring in both finals.

=== Grêmio ===
On 26 June 2026, Série A club Grêmio announced the signing of Wallace on a five-year contract, for a rumoured fee of R$ 3 million for 50% of his economic rights.

== Career statistics ==
As of 12 July 2026

Appearances and goals by club, season and competition
| Club | Season | League | | | State league (Note: Includes Campeonato Alagoano, Campeonato Alagoano Second Division) | | Copa do Brasil | | Continental | | Other | | Total | |
| Club | Season | Division | Apps | Goals | Apps | Goals | Apps | Goals | Apps | Goals | Apps | Goals | Apps | Goals |
|---|---|---|---|---|---|---|---|---|---|---|---|---|---|---|
| CRB | 2023 | Série B | — | | — | | — | | — | | 3 (Note: Appearance(s) in Copa Alagoas) | 0 | 3 | 0 |
| CRB | 2024 | Série B | 0 | 0 | 1 | 0 | 0 | 0 | — | | 3 | 0 | 4 | 0 |
| CRB | 2025 | Série B | 2 | 0 | 0 | 0 | 0 | 0 | — | | 3 (Note: Two appearances in Copa Alagoas, one appearance in Copa do Nordeste) | 0 | 5 | 0 |
| CRB | 2026 | Série B | 6 | 0 | 8 | 0 | 2 | 0 | — | | 3 (Note: Appearance(s) in Copa do Nordeste) | 0 | 19 | 0 |
| CRB | Total | | 8 | 0 | 9 | 0 | 2 | 0 | — | | 12 | 0 | 31 | 0 |
| CRB B | 2023 | Alagoano 2ª Divisão | — | | 9 | 1 | — | | — | | — | | 9 | 1 |
| Grêmio | 2026 | Série A | 0 | 0 | — | | — | | 0 | 0 | — | | 0 | 0 |
| Career total | | | 8 | 0 | 18 | 1 | 2 | 0 | 0 | 0 | 12 | 0 | 40 | 1 |

== Honours ==
CRB

- Campeonato Alagoano: 2024, 2025, 2026
