= Leonel Pérez (footballer) =

Argentine footballer (born 2003)

Personal information
- Full name: Leonel Ulises Pérez
- Date of birth: 9 August 2004 (age 22)
- Place of birth: Rafael Castillo, Argentina
- Height: 1.86 m (6 ft 1 in)
- Position: Defensive midfielder

Team information
- Current team: Racing (on loan from Grêmio)
- Number: 33

Youth career
- Huracán

Senior career*
Years	Team	Apps	(Gls)
2025–2026	Huracán	29	(0)
2026–	Grêmio	12	(0)
2026–	→ Racing (loan)	12	(1)
- * Club domestic league appearances and goals as of 18:15, 8 November 2026 (UTC)

Leonel Ulises Pérez (born 9 August 2004) is an Argentine professional footballer who plays as a defensive midfielder for Argentine Primera División club Racing, on loan from Campeonato Brasileiro Série A club Grêmio.

== Career ==
=== Huracán ===
Born in Rafael Castillo, Buenos Aires Province, Pérez was a product of Huracán's youth categories, but did not stand out during his period with the reserve squad. Ahead of the 2025 season, he impressed in pre-season friendlies and was promoted to the main squad.

Pérez made his professional – and Primera División – debut on 24 January 2025, starting in a 1–1 Belgrano. He immediately became an undisputed starter under manager Frank Darío Kudelka, and scored his first professional goal on 9 April, netting his side's fifth in a 5–0 home routing of Racing Club de Montevideo, for the season's Copa Sudamericana.

On 11 September 2025, already established as a first-choice, Pérez renewed his contract until 2028.

=== Grêmio ===
On 10 February 2026, Campeonato Brasileiro Série A side Grêmio announced the signing of Pérez on a four-year contract, paying US$ 2,833,750 for 50% of his economic rights, with an option for US$3 million for the remaining 50%.

== Career statistics ==
As of 8 August 2026

Club	Season	League			Cup		Continental		State league		Other		Total	
Club	Season	Division	Apps	Goals	Apps	Goals	Apps	Goals	Apps	Goals	Apps	Goals	Apps	Goals
Huracán	2025	Liga Profesional	29	0	1	0	8 (Note: Appearance(s) in Copa Sudamericana)	1	—		—		38	1
Huracán	2026	Liga Profesional	0	0	0	0	—		—		—		0	0
Huracán	Total		29	0	1	0	8	1	—		—		38	1
Grêmio	2026	Série A	12	0	2 (Note: Appearance(s) in Copa do Brasil)	0	5	0	0	0	0	0	19	0
Career total			41	0	3	0	13	1	0	0	0	0	57	1
