= Erick Noriega =

Peruvian footballer (born 2001)

Personal information
- Full name: Erick Carlos Noriega Loret de Mola
- Date of birth: 22 October 2001 (age 25)
- Place of birth: Nagoya, Aichi, Japan
- Height: 1.80 m (5 ft 11 in)
- Positions: Defensive midfielder; centre-back

Team information
- Current team: Grêmio
- Number: 8

Youth career
- –2016: Alianza Lima
- 2016–2020: Shimizu S-Pulse

Senior career*
Years	Team	Apps	(Gls)
2020–2022	Shimizu S-Pulse	0	(0)
2020	→ Machida Zelvia (loan)	7	(0)
2022	SV Straelen	0	(0)
2023	Universidad de San Martín	25	(2)
2024	Comerciantes Unidos	16	(0)
2024–2025	Alianza Lima	32	(3)
2025–	Grêmio	43	(1)

International career^{‡}
2019	Japan U19	3	(0)
2023	Peru U23	4	(0)
2024–	Peru	14	(0)
- * Club domestic league appearances and goals as of 19 September 2026 ‡ National team caps and goals as of 14 November 2026

Erick Carlos Noriega Loret de Mola (born 22 October 2001) is a professional footballer who plays as a defensive midfielder or centre-back for Campeonato Brasileiro Série A club Grêmio. Born in Japan, he represents the Peru national team.

== Career ==
In 2016, Noriega signed for Shimizu S-Pulse. After his career in Machida Zelvia, the lack of opportunities in Japan would prompt Noriega to begin playing in Peru by playing for Universidad de San Martín for the 2023 Liga 1 and later played for Comerciantes Unidos in the 2024 Liga 1.

== International career ==
Noriega would be called up to play for the Japan national under-19 football team and would play against Colombia, Belgium and the Japan national football team. Despite this though, he would choose not to resign his own Peruvian nationality and after playing for San Martín, would begin playing for the Peru national under-23 football team beginning in 2023. He would later play in the 2024 CONMEBOL Pre-Olympic Tournament where Peru would be knocked out in the group stage. On 22 March 2024, Noriega would mark in his debut for Peru in a international friendly against Nicaragua as a substitute for Carlos Ascues.

== Personal life ==
Noriega is the son of two Peruvian parents.

== Career statistics ==
=== Club ===
As of 19 September 2026.

Club	Season	League			State league		National Cup		League Cup		Continental		Total	
Club	Season	Division	Apps	Goals	Apps	Goals	Apps	Goals	Apps	Goals	Apps	Goals	Apps	Goals
Shimizu S-Pulse	2020	J1 League	0	0	–		0	0	0	0	0	0	0	0
Machida Zelvia (loan)	2020	J2 League	7	0	–		0	0	–		0	0	7	0
Universidad de San Martín	2023	Peruvian Liga 2	25	2	–		–		–		–		25	2
Comerciantes Unidos	2024	Peruvian Liga 1	16	0	–		–		–		–		16	0
Alianza Lima	2024	Peruvian Liga 1	16	1	–		–		–		–		16	1
Alianza Lima	2025	Peruvian Liga 1	16	2	–		–		–		12 (Note: Appearances in Copa Sudamericana)	0	28	2
Alianza Lima	Total		32	3	–		0	0	–		12	0	44	3
Grêmio	2025	Série A	14	0	–		–		–		–		14	0
Grêmio	2026	Série A	21	1	8	0	5	0	–		6	0	40	1
Grêmio	Total		33	1	8	0	5	0	–		6	0	54	1
Career total			113	6	8	0	5	0	0	0	18	0	144	6

=== International ===
As of match played 13 November 2026

Appearances and goals by national team and year
National team	Year	Apps	Goals
Peru	2024	1	0
Peru	2025	5	0
Peru	2026	8	0
Total		14	0

== Honours ==
Grêmio

- Campeonato Gaúcho: 2026
