= José Enamorado =

Colombian football player (born 1999)

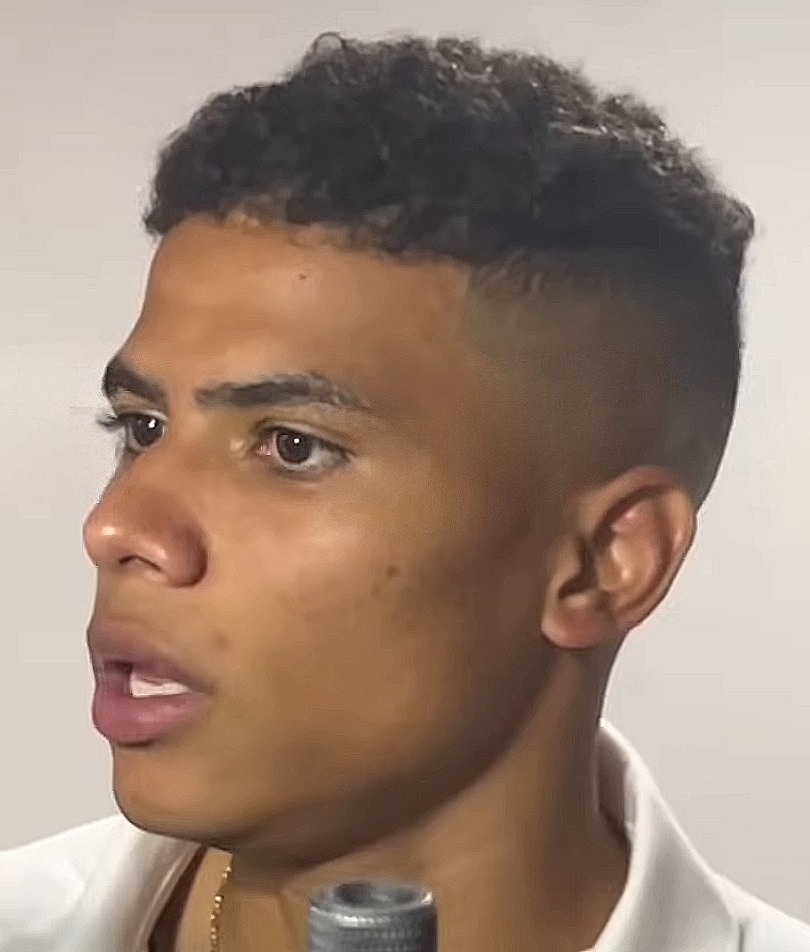
- Enamorado in 2024

Personal information
- Full name: José David Enamorado Gómez
- Date of birth: 13 January 1999 (age 27)
- Place of birth: Soledad, Atlántico, Colombia
- Height: 1.67 m (5 ft 6 in)
- Position: Winger

Team information
- Current team: Grêmio
- Number: 99

Youth career
- 2014–2015: Real Costa Hermosa
- 2015–2016: Escuela Barranquillera

Senior career*
Years	Team	Apps	(Gls)
2016–2020	Orsomarso	58	(5)
2019	→ La Equidad (loan)	1	(0)
2020	→ Deportivo Cali (loan)	9	(0)
2021–2023	Real Cartagena	47	(5)
2022–2023	→ Santa Fe (loan)	39	(5)
2023	→ Atlético Junior (loan)	19	(3)
2024–2025	Atlético Junior	89	(10)
2026–	Grêmio	16	(1)

International career
2018	Colombia U-21	4	(0)
2019	Colombia U-20	5	(0)
- * Club domestic league appearances and goals as of 7 April 2026

José David Enamorado Gómez (born 13 January 1999) is a Colombian professional footballer who plays as a winger for Campeonato Brasileiro Série A club Grêmio.

== Career ==
=== Club career ===
Enamorado started playing football at Real Costa Hermosa (2014–2015) and later he played at the Escuela Barranquillera (2015–2016).

He started his senior career with Orsomarso, which he joined in mid-2016, and made his debut in the Categoría Primera B on 30 September 2016 against Tigres at the age of 17. The young winger made 44 league appearances for Orsomarso from 2016 until the end of the 2018 season.

After good performances in the 2019 South American U-20 Championship with the Colombian U-20 national team in January 2019, Enamorado was close to join Argentine club Racing Club. However, he instead ended up joining Categoría Primera A club La Equidad on loan for the 2019 season. However, due to lack of playing time, the loan was cut short and Enamorado returned to Orsomarso in the summer 2019.

On 5 January 2020, Enamorado joined Categoría Primera A club Deportivo Cali on a one-year loan with an option to buy. In December 2020, Enamorado signed with Real Cartagena. In July 2022, Enamorado was loaned out to Independiente Santa Fe until June 2023. After returning, he was sent out on a new loan spell, this time for a year at Atlético Junior with a purchase option.

On 5 January 2024 it was confirmed, that Enamorado would continue on permanent basis at Atlético Junior. He reportedly signed a 3-year contract.

On 10 January 2026, Enamorado moved to Brazil, joining Série A club Grêmio on a three-year contract, for a fee reported to be around €2.5 million.

== Honours ==
Atlético Junior

- Categoría Primera A (1): 2023-II

Grêmio

- Campeonato Gaúcho: 2026
