= Francis Amuzu =

Belgian footballer (born 1999)

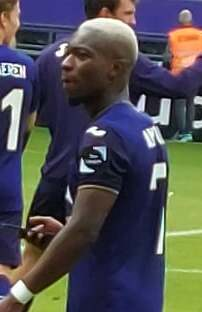
- Amuzu at Anderlecht in 2021

Personal information
- Full name: Francis Apelete Amuzu
- Date of birth: 23 August 1999 (age 27)
- Place of birth: Accra, Ghana
- Height: 1.70 m (5 ft 7 in)
- Position: Winger

Team information
- Current team: Grêmio
- Number: 9

Youth career
- SK Heffen
- Mechelen
- –2015: JMG Academy Lier
- 2015–2017: Anderlecht

Senior career*
Years	Team	Apps	(Gls)
2017–2025	Anderlecht	205	(25)
2025–	Grêmio	34	(5)

International career^{‡}
2017–2018	Belgium U19	7	(2)
2018–2020	Belgium U21	14	(2)
- * Club domestic league appearances and goals as of 5 May 2026 ‡ National team caps and goals as of 7 May 2026

Francis Apelete Amuzu (born 23 August 1999) is a Ghanaian professional footballer who plays as a winger for Campeonato Brasileiro Série A club Grêmio.

Amuzu began his career with Anderlecht, and spent eight full seasons in the first team before moving to Brazilian club Grêmio in 2025. He represented Belgium at youth level before starting to play for Ghana internationally in 2026.

== Club career ==
=== Anderlecht ===
Born in Ghana to Ghanaian former midfielder Theophilus Amuzu, Amuzu moved to Belgium at an early age and played for the youth teams of SK Heffen, Mechelen and JMG Academy Lier. He signed his first professional contract on 23 August 2015 with Anderlecht for three years. He made his professional debut for Anderlecht in a 1–0 Belgian First Division A win over Eupen on 22 December 2017, scoring his side's game-winning goal on his debut. He pledged his international football to Belgium national team.

On 20 September 2018, he made his debut in the European Competitions in a UEFA Europa League match against Spartak Trnava.

He made his 50th Belgian Pro League appearance for Anderlecht on 12 September 2019, in match against Sporting Charleroi.

He made his 100th league appearance for Anderlecht in a Pro League match against Sint-Truiden.

On 27 August 2023, Amuzu scored the winning goal in a Pro League match against Sporting Charleroi. He then scored from outside the box a week later, in a 1–1 draw against Genk, on 3 September 2023.

On 7 October 2023, he scored in the match against KV Mechelen which honoured club icon Paul Van Himst on his 80th birthday.

On 28 November 2024, Amuzu scored a stunning late equaliser against FC Porto in a UEFA Europa League league phase match, after he came on as a substitute for Samuel Edozie in the 60th minute. Amuzu was heavily praised by the Portuguese press after playing a good game.

On 26 January 2025, Amuzu played his 250th game for Anderlecht coming on as a substitute for César Huerta in the 81st minute in a 4–1 win against Mechelen. Amuzu would finish his Anderlecht career with 28 goals and 24 assists in 250 official matches for the club.

=== Grêmio ===
On 10 February 2025, Grêmio announced the signing of Amuzu. He joined the club on a permanent deal until December 2026.

== International career ==
Amuzu was eligible to represent both Ghana and Belgium at international level, initially favoring the latter. He featured for Belgium at youth level and scored on his under-21 debut, the winner in an October 2018 friendly match versus Italy.

In 2022, Amuzu affirmed his allegiance to Belgium by stating "My sporty heart lies with Belgium. With Belgium you can go very far at such a World Cup, with Ghana there is a real chance that you will be out quickly." In 2026, however, he switched back to his native country ahead of the 2026 FIFA World Cup, and was called up by Carlos Queiroz for a friendly against Mexico in May of that year; Grêmio, however, made the player unavailable for the match.

== Career statistics ==
As of match played 5 May 2026

Appearances and goals by club, season and competition
Club	Season	League			State league (Note: Includes Campeonato Gaúcho)		National cup (Note: Includes Belgian Cup, Copa do Brasil)		Continental		Other		Total	
Club	Season	Division	Apps	Goals	Apps	Goals	Apps	Goals	Apps	Goals	Apps	Goals	Apps	Goals
Anderlecht	2017–18	Belgian Pro League	11	1	–		0	0	0	0	–		11	1
Anderlecht	2018–19	Belgian Pro League	30	1	–		1	0	4 (Note: Appearances in UEFA Europa League)	0	–		35	1
Anderlecht	2019–20	Belgian Pro League	20	3	–		1	0	—		–		21	3
Anderlecht	2020–21	Belgian Pro League	35	2	–		4	0	—		–		39	2
Anderlecht	2021–22	Belgian Pro League	37	9	–		6	0	3 (Note: Appearances in UEFA Conference League)	1	–		46	10
Anderlecht	2022–23	Belgian Pro League	33	3	–		2	0	15	0	–		50	3
Anderlecht	2023–24	Belgian Pro League	21	4	–		0	0	–		–		21	4
Anderlecht	2024–25	Belgian Pro League	18	2	–		3	0	7	2	–		28	4
Anderlecht	Total		205	25	–		17	0	29	3	0	0	251	28
Grêmio	2025	Série A	22	4	3	0	3	0	4 (Note: Appearances in Copa Sudamericana)	0	1 (Note: Appearance(s) in Recopa Gaúcha)	1	33	5
Grêmio	2026	Série A	12	1	9	3	1	1	3	2	–		25	7
Grêmio	Total		34	5	12	3	4	1	7	2	1	1	58	12
Career total			239	30	12	3	21	1	36	5	1	1	309	40

== Honours ==
Grêmio

- Campeonato Gaúcho: 2026
- Recopa Gaúcha: 2025
