= Weverton (footballer, born 1987) =

Brazilian footballer

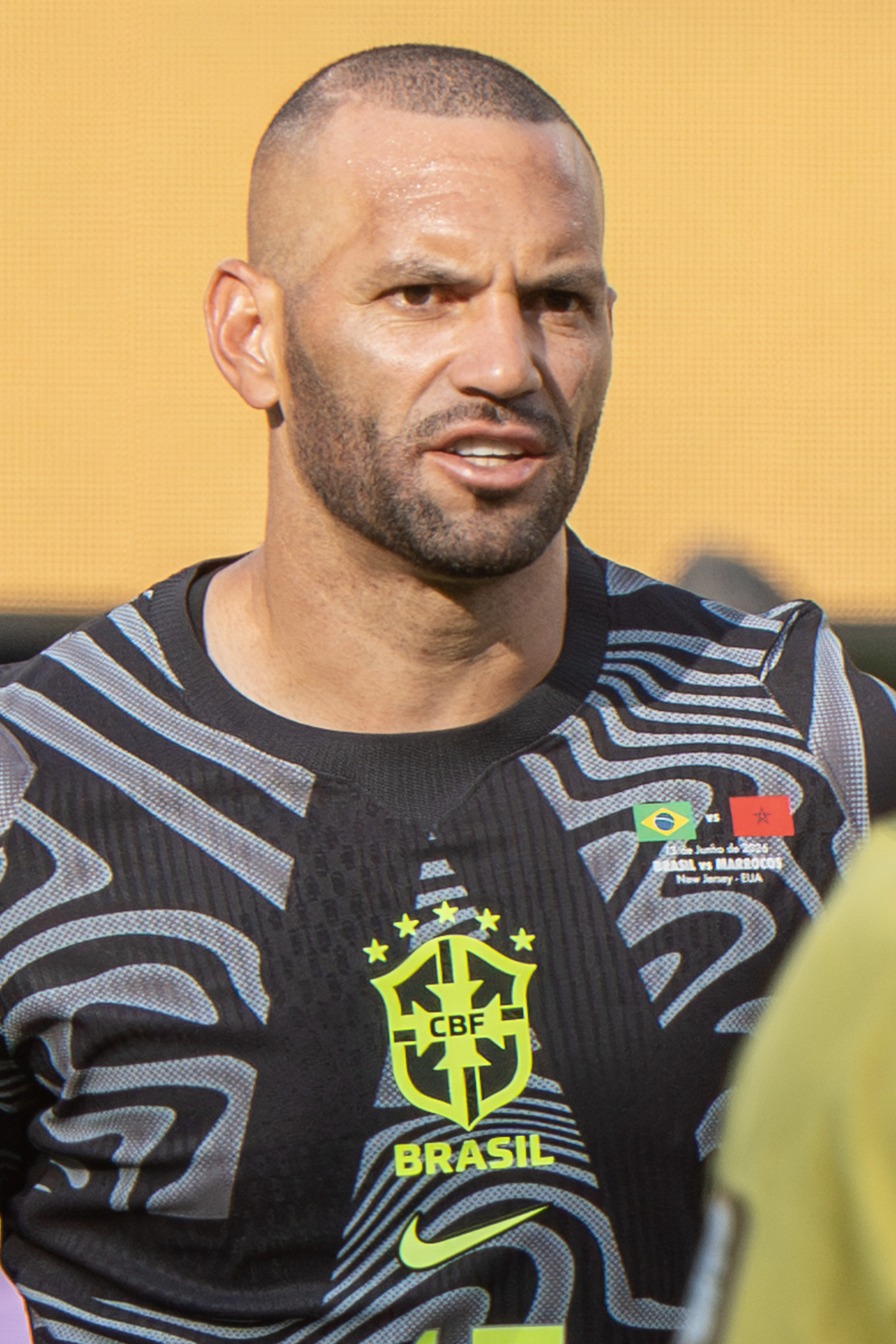
- Weverton with Brazil in 2026

Personal information
- Full name: Weverton Pereira da Silva
- Date of birth: 13 December 1987 (age 38)
- Place of birth: Rio Branco, Acre, Brazil
- Height: 1.89 m (6 ft 2 in)
- Position: Goalkeeper

Team information
- Current team: Grêmio
- Number: 1

Youth career
- 2002–2004: Andirá
- 2005–2006: Juventus-AC
- 2006–2007: Corinthians

Senior career*
| Years | Team | Apps | (Gls) |
| 2006–2009 | Corinthians | 0 | (0) |
| 2007 | → Remo (loan) | 1 | (0) |
| 2009 | → Oeste (loan) | 18 | (0) |
| 2009 | → América de Natal (loan) | 16 | (0) |
| 2010 | Botafogo-SP | 22 | (0) |
| 2010–2012 | Portuguesa | 101 | (0) |
| 2012–2017 | Atlético Paranaense | 241 | (0) |
| 2018–2026 | Palmeiras | 322 | (0) |
| 2026– | Grêmio | 38 | (0) |

International career
| 2016 | Brazil Olympic | 6 | (0) |
| 2016–2026 | Brazil | 11 | (0) |
Medal record
Olympic Games
| Gold medal – first place | 2016 Rio de Janeiro | Team |
Copa América
| Runner-up | 2021 Brazil |
- * Club domestic league appearances and goals as of 29 October 2026 (UTC)

Weverton Pereira da Silva (born 13 December 1987), simply known as Weverton (Brazilian Portuguese: [ˈwɛveʁtõw̃]), is a Brazilian professional footballer who plays as a goalkeeper for Campeonato Brasileiro Série A club Grêmio.

== Club career ==
=== Early career ===
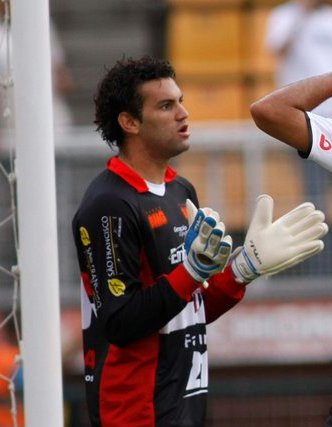
Weverton playing for Botafogo-SP in 2010

Born in Rio Branco, Acre, Weverton joined Corinthians' youth setup in 2006, aged 18, after impressing in a match for Rio Branco. He was promoted to the former's main squad in 2007, but was demoted to fourth-choice after Rafael Santos' promotion.

After failing to make an appearance for Timão, Weverton was subsequently loaned to Remo, Oeste and América de Natal. With the latter he appeared regularly in Série B, sharing minutes with the veteran Rodolpho.

Weverton was released by Corinthians in January 2010 and shortly after moved to Botafogo-SP.

=== Portuguesa ===
After impressing with the side, Weverton signed for Portuguesa on 12 May 2010. Weverton was an undisputed starter at Lusa, appearing in all league matches in 2011, as his side were crowned champions of the second division.

=== Atlético Paranaense ===
In May 2012, Weverton joined Atlético Paranaense, after his previous contract expired. On 15 October 2014, after being named captain for the campaign, he renewed his contract until 2017.

=== Palmeiras ===
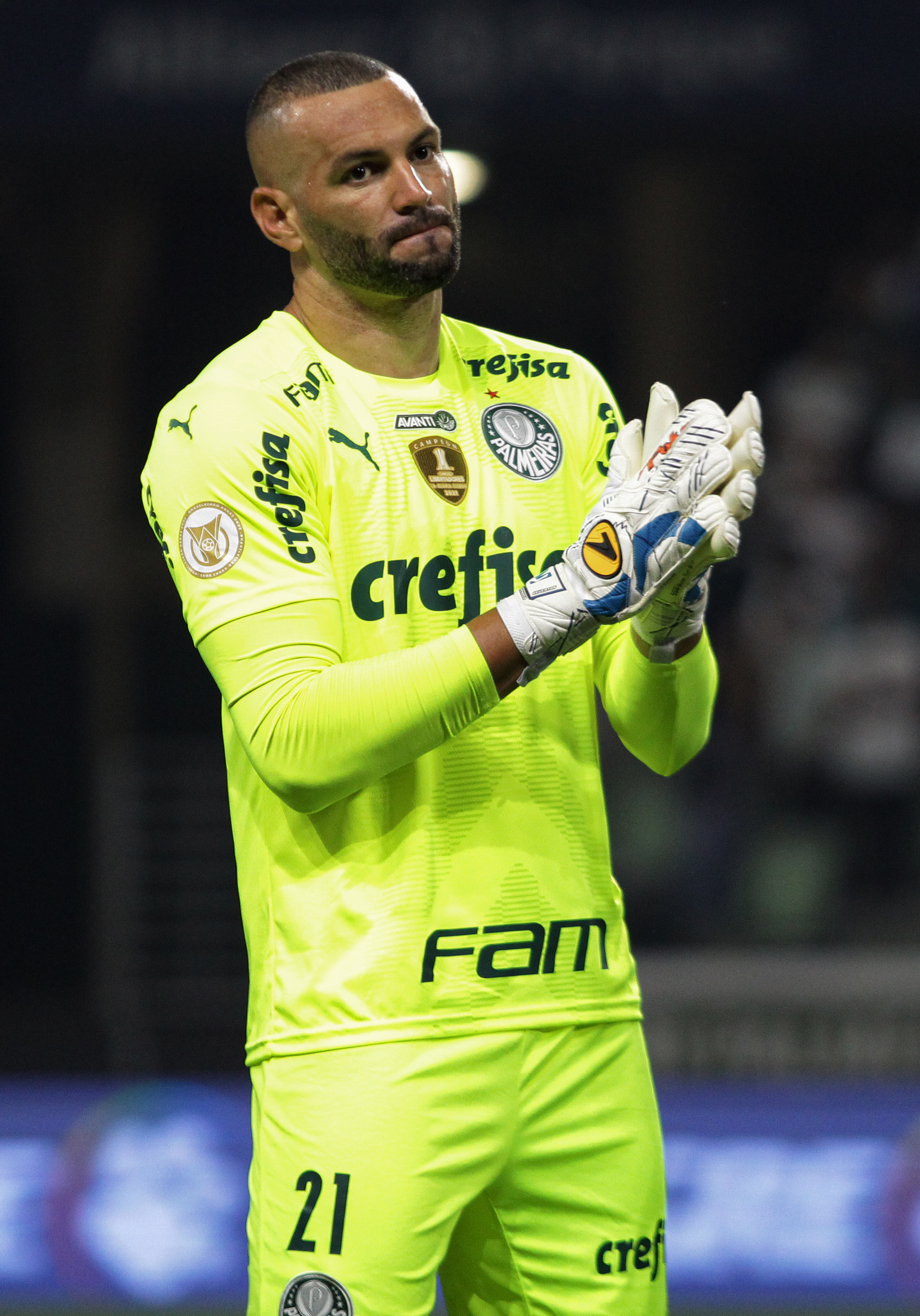
Weverton in action for Palmeiras in 2022

In December 2017, Weverton joined Palmeiras on a five-year deal, for a rumoured fee of R$ 2 million. He missed the deciding penalty kick in the 2021 Recopa Sudamericana, resulting in a win for Defensa y Justicia.

In August 2021, after winning against São Paulo in the quarterfinals of Copa Libertadores, Weverton overcame Marcos as the Palmeiras player with the most victories in the competition, with a total of 28 wins.

=== Grêmio ===
On 15 January 2026, Weverton joined Grêmio on a three-year contract ending in 2028.

== International career ==
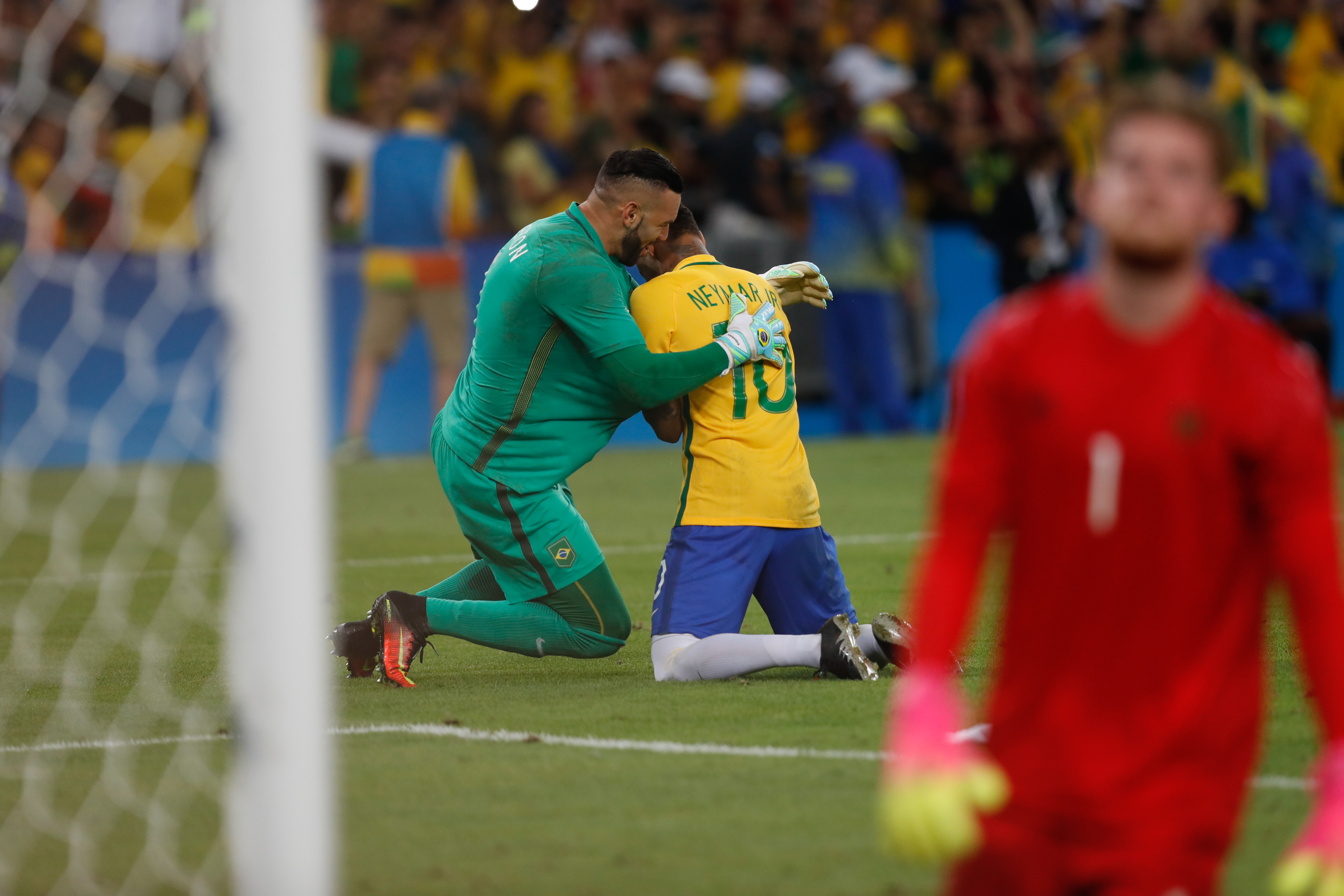
Weverton celebrating the Olympic gold medal win alongside Neymar

On 31 July 2016, Weverton was called by the Brazilian Olympic team for the 2016 Summer Olympics by head coach Rogério Micale to replace Fernando Prass who left the team due to injury. In the gold medal match, Weverton made a key save against Germany's Nils Petersen on the fifth penalty shot, which helped Brazil win their first Olympic football gold.

After winning gold medal at the 2016 Rio Olympics, Weverton was called up by coach Tite to qualification matches against Ecuador and Colombia.

Weverton made his return, after more than three years, to the Brazil national team on 9 October 2020. On the subject of making his return, Weverton said that "It was a special game for me."

In June 2021, Weverton was included in Brazil's squad for the 2021 Copa América on home soil. On 23 June, he appeared in Brazil's third group match, a 2–1 win over Colombia.

On 7 November 2022, Weverton was named in the squad for the 2022 FIFA World Cup. He was brought on as a substitute for Alisson in the 80th minute of Brazil's round of 16 game against South Korea, with Brazil 4–1 up. He did not concede any as Brazil maintained the scoreline.

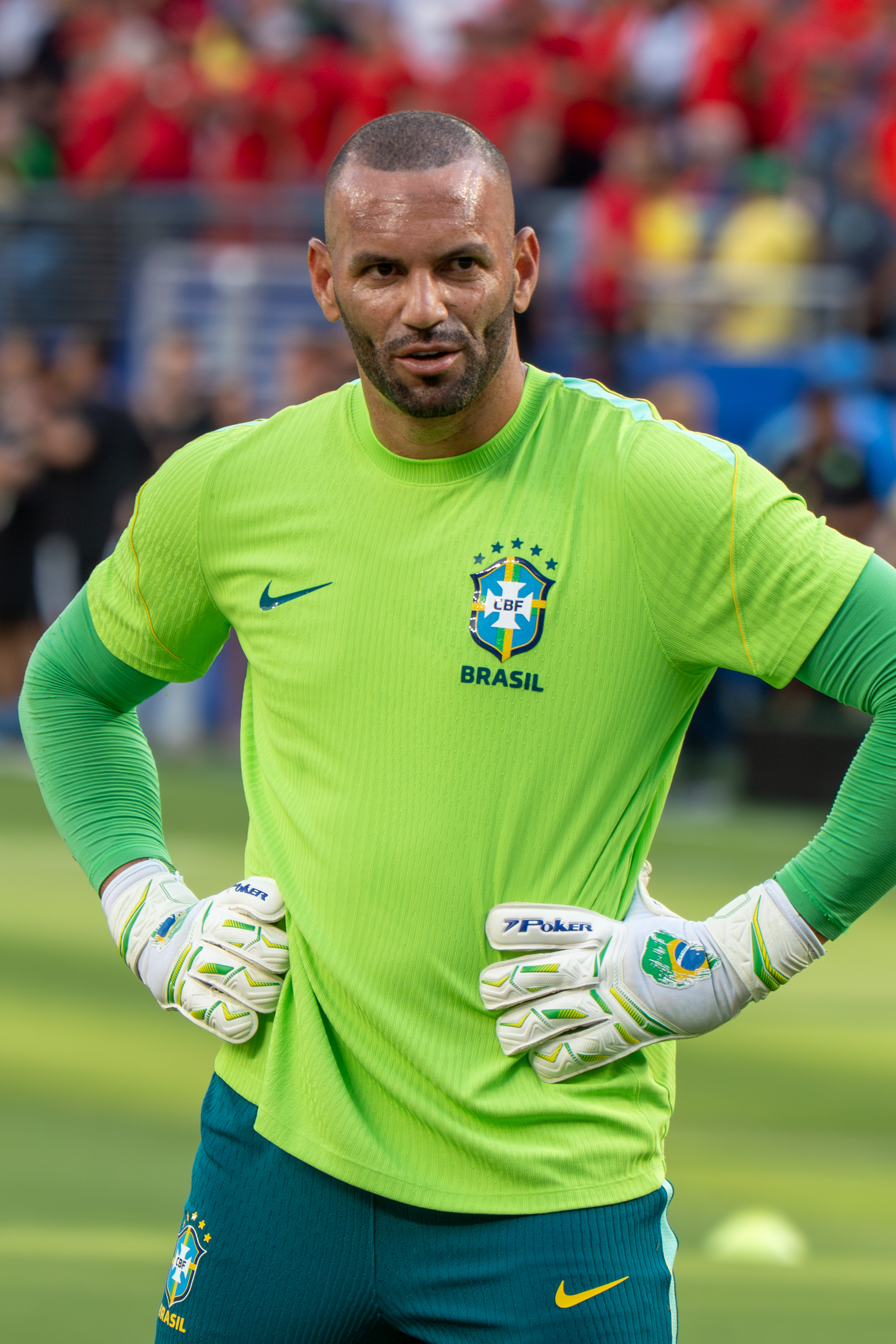
Weverton for Brazil during the 2026 World Cup

Despite not being a regular option in the call-ups in the following years, Weverton was included in Carlo Ancelotti's 26-man squad for the 2026 FIFA World Cup on 18 May 2026. His call-up came as a surprise, as the favorites for the spot were Bento and Hugo Souza. Weverton did not take the field during his second World Cup, and Brazil was eliminated by Norway in the Round of 16, marking the end of his time with the national team.

== Career statistics ==
=== Club ===
As of match played 29 October 2026

Appearances and goals by club, season and competition
| Club | Season | League | | | State league (Note: Includes Campeonato Paulista, Campeonato Gaúcho) | | Copa do Brasil | | Continental | | Other | | Total | |
| Club | Season | Division | Apps | Goals | Apps | Goals | Apps | Goals | Apps | Goals | Apps | Goals | Apps | Goals |
|---|---|---|---|---|---|---|---|---|---|---|---|---|---|---|
| Corinthians | 2007 | Série A | 0 | 0 | 0 | 0 | 0 | 0 | — | | — | | 0 | 0 |
| Corinthians | 2008 | Série B | 0 | 0 | 0 | 0 | 0 | 0 | — | | — | | 0 | 0 |
| Corinthians | Total | | 0 | 0 | 0 | 0 | 0 | 0 | — | | — | | 0 | 0 |
| Remo (loan) | 2007 | Série B | 1 | 0 | — | | — | | — | | — | | 1 | 0 |
| Oeste (loan) | 2009 | Paulista | — | | 18 | 0 | — | | — | | — | | 18 | 0 |
| América de Natal (loan) | 2009 | Série B | 16 | 0 | — | | — | | — | | — | | 16 | 0 |
| Botafogo-SP | 2010 | Série D | 0 | 0 | 22 | 0 | — | | — | | — | | 22 | 0 |
| Portuguesa | 2010 | Série B | 29 | 0 | — | | — | | — | | — | | 29 | 0 |
| Portuguesa | 2011 | Série B | 38 | 0 | 19 | 0 | 0 | 0 | — | | — | | 57 | 0 |
| Portuguesa | 2012 | Série A | 1 | 0 | 14 | 0 | 4 | 0 | — | | — | | 19 | 0 |
| Portuguesa | Total | | 68 | 0 | 33 | 0 | 4 | 0 | — | | — | | 105 | 0 |
| Atlético Paranaense | 2012 | Série B | 33 | 0 | — | | — | | — | | — | | 33 | 0 |
| Atlético Paranaense | 2013 | Série A | 38 | 0 | — | | 13 | 0 | — | | — | | 51 | 0 |
| Atlético Paranaense | 2014 | Série A | 35 | 0 | — | | 2 | 0 | 8 (Note: Appearances in Copa Libertadores) | 0 | — | | 45 | 0 |
| Atlético Paranaense | 2015 | Série A | 36 | 0 | 11 | 0 | 4 | 0 | 6 (Note: Appearances in Copa Sudamericana) | 0 | — | | 57 | 0 |
| Atlético Paranaense | 2016 | Série A | 30 | 0 | 15 | 0 | 8 | 0 | — | | 5 (Note: Appearances in Primeira Liga) | 0 | 58 | 0 |
| Atlético Paranaense | 2017 | Série A | 34 | 0 | 9 | 0 | 4 | 0 | 12 | 0 | 0 | 0 | 59 | 0 |
| Atlético Paranaense | Total | | 206 | 0 | 35 | 0 | 31 | 0 | 26 | 0 | 5 | 0 | 303 | 0 |
| Palmeiras | 2018 | Série A | 23 | 0 | 1 | 0 | 4 | 0 | 6 | 0 | — | | 34 | 0 |
| Palmeiras | 2019 | Série A | 31 | 0 | 7 | 0 | 3 | 0 | 10 | 0 | — | | 51 | 0 |
| Palmeiras | 2020 | Série A | 30 | 0 | 16 | 0 | 7 | 0 | 13 | 0 | 2 (Note: Appearances in FIFA Club World Cup) | 0 | 68 | 0 |
| Palmeiras | 2021 | Série A | 21 | 0 | 9 | 0 | 1 | 0 | 12 | 0 | 5 (Note: One appearance in Supercopa do Brasil, two appearances in Recopa Sudamericana, two appearances in FIFA Club World Cup) | 0 | 48 | 0 |
| Palmeiras | 2022 | Série A | 34 | 0 | 9 | 0 | 3 | 0 | 12 | 0 | 2 (Note: Appearances in Recopa Sudamericana) | 0 | 60 | 0 |
| Palmeiras | 2023 | Série A | 35 | 0 | 15 | 0 | 6 | 0 | 11 | 0 | 1 (Note: Appearance in Supercopa do Brasil) | 0 | 68 | 0 |
| Palmeiras | 2024 | Série A | 37 | 0 | 14 | 0 | 2 | 0 | 7 | 0 | 1 | 0 | 61 | 0 |
| Palmeiras | 2025 | Série A | 26 | 0 | 14 | 0 | 4 | 0 | 9 | 0 | 5 | 0 | 58 | 0 |
| Palmeiras | Total | | 237 | 0 | 85 | 0 | 30 | 0 | 80 | 0 | 16 | 0 | 448 | 0 |
| Grêmio | 2026 | Série A | 31 | 0 | 7 | 0 | 6 | 0 | 7 | 0 | — | | 51 | 0 |
| Career total | | | 559 | 0 | 200 | 0 | 71 | 0 | 113 | 0 | 21 | 0 | 964 | 0 |

=== International ===
As of match played 6 June 2026

Appearances and goals by national team and year
| National team | Year | Apps | Goals |
|---|---|---|---|
| Brazil | 2017 | 2 | 0 |
| Brazil | 2018 | 0 | 0 |
| Brazil | 2019 | 0 | 0 |
| Brazil | 2020 | 2 | 0 |
| Brazil | 2021 | 3 | 0 |
| Brazil | 2022 | 2 | 0 |
| Brazil | 2023 | 1 | 0 |
| Brazil | 2024 | 0 | 0 |
| Brazil | 2025 | 0 | 0 |
| Brazil | 2026 | 1 | 0 |
| Total | | 11 | 0 |

== Honours ==
Corinthians

- Campeonato Brasileiro Série B: 2008

Portuguesa

- Campeonato Brasileiro Série B: 2011

Athletico Paranaense

- Campeonato Paranaense: 2016

Palmeiras

- Campeonato Brasileiro Série A: 2018, 2022, 2023
- Campeonato Paulista: 2020, 2022, 2023, 2024
- Copa do Brasil: 2020
- Copa Libertadores: 2020, 2021
- Recopa Sudamericana: 2022
- Supercopa do Brasil: 2023

Grêmio

- Campeonato Gaúcho: 2026

Brazil

- Summer Olympics: 2016

Individual

- Bola de Prata: 2020, 2021, 2023
- Campeonato Brasileiro Série A Team of the Year: 2020, 2021, 2022
- Best Goalkeeper in Brazil: 2019, 2020, 2021
- Copa do Brasil Best Goalkeeper: 2020
- Copa do Brasil Team of the Final: 2020
- Copa Libertadores Team of the Tournament: 2020, 2021
- South American Team of the Year: 2020, 2021, 2022
- IFFHS CONMEBOL Team of the Year: 2021 (substitute)
- Campeonato Paulista Team of the Year: 2021, 2022, 2023
