= Gabriel Mec =

Brazilian footballer

Personal information
- Full name: Gabriel Ferreira de Carvalho
- Date of birth: 11 April 2008 (age 18)
- Place of birth: Campos dos Goytacazes, Brazil
- Height: 1.73 m (5 ft 8 in)
- Positions: Left winger; attacking midfielder

Team information
- Current team: Porto
- Number: 37

Youth career
- 2017–2026: Grêmio

Senior career*
Years	Team	Apps	(Gls)
2025–2026	Grêmio	10	(1)
2026–	Porto	0	(0)
- * Club domestic league appearances and goals as of 2 September 2026

Gabriel Ferreira de Carvalho (born 11 April 2008), better known as Gabriel Mec, is a Brazilian professional footballer who plays as a left winger or attacking midfielder for Primeira Liga club Porto.

== Youth career ==
Born in Campos dos Goytacazes, Gabriel Mec has been at Grêmio since he was 9 years old. In August 2024, the player caught the attention of international football, especially Chelsea, when he received an offer of € 24 million. Agencyed by Neymar's father (Neymar Sr.), Grêmio agreed a renewal contract with the athlete until the end of 2026.

In the 2025 Copa São Paulo de Futebol Jr., Gabriel Mec gained even more prominence as a highlight of Grêmio's excellent campaign in the competition.

== Honours ==
Grêmio

- Campeonato Gaúcho: 2026

Grêmio (youth)

- Campeonato Gaúcho Sub-17: 2023
- Campeonato Gaúcho Sub-13: 2020
