= Viery =

Brazilian footballer

Personal information
- Full name: Viery Fernandes Santos Lopes
- Date of birth: 2 January 2005 (age 21)
- Place of birth: Ubá, Brazil
- Height: 1.87 m (6 ft 2 in)
- Position: Centre-back

Team information
- Current team: Fiorentina
- Number: 33

Youth career
- 2015–2025: Grêmio

Senior career*
Years	Team	Apps	(Gls)
2025–2026	Grêmio	26	(2)
2026–	Fiorentina	6	(0)
- * Club domestic league appearances and goals as of 17:01, 18 October 2026 (UTC)

Viery Fernandes Santos Lopes (born 2 January 2005), simply known as Viery, is a Brazilian professional footballer who plays as a centre-back for Serie A club Fiorentina.

== Career ==
=== Grêmio ===
Born in Ubá, Minas Gerais, Viery joined Grêmio's youth sides in 2015, aged ten. On 15 June 2023, he signed a new contract with the club, renewing his link until 2027.

After progressing in the under-20 squad and playing with a B-side in the 2023 Copa FGF, Viery made his first team debut on 27 January 2025, coming on as a late substitute for Mayk in a 4–0 Campeonato Gaúcho home routing of Caxias.

On 21 January 2026, Viery renewed his contract until December 2029. He subsequently established himself as a starter, and scored his first goal on 22 February, netting the equalizer in a 1–1 away draw against Juventude.

=== Fiorentina ===
On 1 July 2026, Serie A club Fiorentina announced the signing of Viery.

== Career statistics ==
As of 18 October 2026

Appearances and goals by club, season and competition
Club	Season	League			State League		National Cup		Continental		Other		Total	
Club	Season	Division	Apps	Goals	Apps	Goals	Apps	Goals	Apps	Goals	Apps	Goals	Apps	Goals
Grêmio	2023	Série A	0	0	—		0	0	—		3 (Note: Appearance(s) in Copa FGF)	0	3	0
Grêmio	2024	Série A	0	0	0	0	0	0	0	0	—		0	0
Grêmio	2025	Série A	3	0	6	0	1	0	2 (Note: Appearance(s) in Copa Sudamericana)	0	—		12	0
Grêmio	2026	Série A	13	1	7	1	2	0	5	0	—		27	2
Grêmio	Total		16	1	13	1	3	0	7	0	3	0	42	2
Fiorentina	2026–27	Serie A	6	0	—		1	0	—		—		7	0
Career total			22	1	13	1	4	0	7	0	3	0	49	2

== Honours ==
Grêmio

- Recopa Gaúcha: 2025
- Campeonato Gaúcho: 2026
