= Gabriel Grando =

Brazilian footballer (born 2000)

Personal information
- Full name: Gabriel Hamester Grando
- Date of birth: 29 March 2000 (age 26)
- Place of birth: Chapecó, Brazil
- Height: 1.92 m (6 ft 4 in)
- Position: Goalkeeper

Team information
- Current team: Grêmio
- Number: 12

Youth career
- 2014–2021: Grêmio

Senior career*
Years	Team	Apps	(Gls)
2021–	Grêmio	89	(0)
2024	→ Cruzeiro (loan)	0	(0)
- * Club domestic league appearances and goals as of 7 April 2026

Gabriel Hamester Grando (born 29 March 2000), known as Gabriel Grando, is a Brazilian professional footballer who plays as a goalkeeper for Grêmio.

== Club career ==
=== Grêmio ===
Born in Chapecó, Brazil, Gabriel Grando joined the Grêmio's Academy at the age of 14 in 2014.

== International career ==
Gabriel was called up to the Brazil national team for the first time in November 2021 for their 2022 FIFA World Cup qualifiers.

== Career statistics ==
=== Club ===
As of match played 31 January 2026

Appearances and goals by club, season and competition
Club	Season	League			State League		National Cup		Continental		Other		Total	
Club	Season	Division	Apps	Goals	Apps	Goals	Apps	Goals	Apps	Goals	Apps	Goals	Apps	Goals
Grêmio	2021	Série A	24	0	0	0	3	0	4 (Note: Appearance(s) in Copa Sudamericana.)	0	—		31	0
Grêmio	2022	Série B	13	0	3	0	0	0	—		—		16	0
Grêmio	2023	Série A	31	0	1	0	7	0	—		—		39	0
Grêmio	2024	Série A	0	0	1	0	0	0	0	0	—		1	0
Grêmio	2025	Série A	6	0	6	0	1	0	1	0	—		14	0
Grêmio	2026	Série A	0	0	3	0	0	0	0	0	—		3	0
Grêmio	Total		74	0	14	0	11	0	5	0	—		104	0
Cruzeiro (loan)	2024	Série A	0	0	—		—		—		—		0	0
Career total			74	0	14	0	11	0	5	0	0	0	104	0

== Honours ==
Grêmio

- Campeonato Gaúcho: 2021, 2022, 2023, 2024, 2026
- Recopa Gaúcha: 2021, 2022, 2023, 2025
