= Luís Castro (footballer, born 1961) =

Portuguese footballer and manager

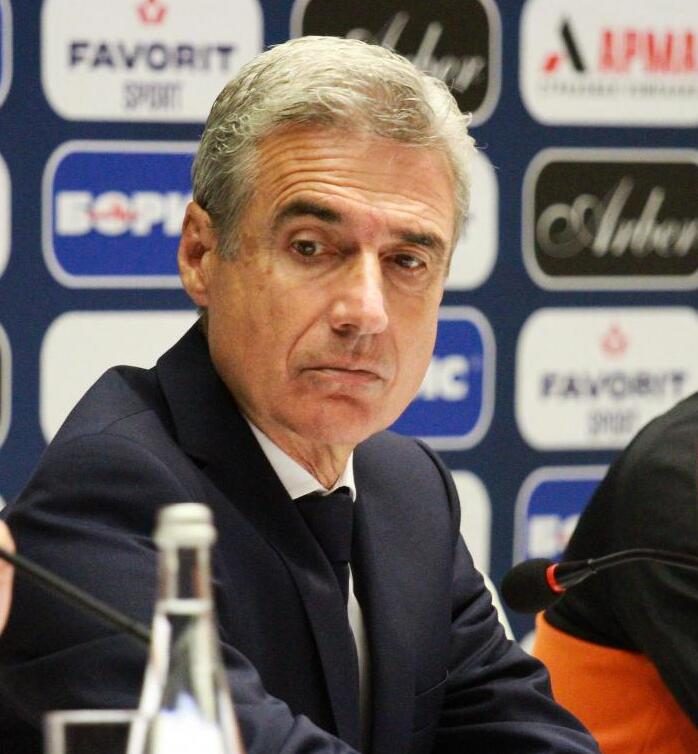
- Castro with Shakhtar Donetsk in 2019

Personal information
- Full name: Luís Manuel Ribeiro de Castro
- Date of birth: 3 September 1961 (age 65)
- Place of birth: Mondrões, Portugal
- Position: Right-back

Youth career
- 1976–1977: Vieirense
- 1977–1980: União Leiria

Senior career*
Years	Team	Apps	(Gls)
1980–1981	União Leiria	1	(0)
1981–1982	Vieirense		
1982–1985	União Leiria	46	(1)
1985–1987	Vitória Guimarães	1	(0)
1987–1989	Elvas	58	(0)
1989–1990	Fafe	6	(0)
1990–1997	Águeda	147	(3)
Total		259	(4)

Managerial career
- 1998–2000: Águeda
- 2000–2001: Mealhada
- 2001–2003: Estarreja
- 2003–2004: Sanjoanense
- 2004–2006: Penafiel
- 2013–2014: Porto B
- 2014: Porto
- 2014–2016: Porto B
- 2016–2017: Rio Ave
- 2017–2018: Chaves
- 2018–2019: Vitória Guimarães
- 2019–2021: Shakhtar Donetsk
- 2021–2022: Al-Duhail
- 2022–2023: Botafogo
- 2023–2024: Al-Nassr
- 2025: Al Wasl
- 2025–2026: Grêmio
- * Club domestic league appearances and goals

Luís Manuel Ribeiro de Castro (born 3 September 1961) is a Portuguese football manager and former player who played as a right-back.

He played for Vitória de Guimarães and Elvas in the Primeira Liga but spent most of his career in the lower leagues. In a managerial career of over a quarter of a century, he led four teams in his nation's top flight, including briefly Porto where he won the second tier with the reserve team in 2016. He also won a Ukrainian Premier League title for Shakhtar Donetsk in 2020, and worked in Qatar, Brazil, Saudi Arabia and the United Arab Emirates.

== Early life ==
Castro was born in the village of Mondrões, in Vila Real. He moved to Casal dos Claros and Vieira de Leiria in the Leiria District, due to his father's military profession. At age 11, he nearly died of purpura, which stopped him from playing football for three years.

For two years, Castro was a student of Physics at the University of Coimbra.

== Playing career ==
Castro spent most of his 17-year professional career in the lower leagues, representing União de Leiria, Elvas, Fafe and Águeda in the Segunda Liga, and Vitória de Guimarães and Elvas in the Primeira Liga.

With the latter, he appeared in 28 matches in the 1987–88 season, but his team ranked in 15th place and suffered relegation.

== Coaching career ==
=== Portugal ===
One year after retiring from professional football, Castro began working as a manager with his final club Águeda, where he would remain two seasons. He went on to be in charge of lowly Mealhada, Estarreja and Sanjoanense, before being appointed at Penafiel in the top tier in summer 2004 and guiding it to the eleventh position in his debut campaign, the highlight being a 1–0 home win against Benfica.

Following Penafiel's relegation in 2006, Castro left the club, joining Porto's youth academy and eventually coaching the reserves. On 5 March 2014, following the resignation of Paulo Fonseca at the helm of the main squad, he was put in interim charge until the end of the season.

Castro led Porto's reserves to the LigaPro title in 2015–16; they were the first B team to win the division and as such ineligible for promotion. He then managed three sides in the Portuguese top flight after leaving for Rio Ave in November 2016, going on to Chaves and Vitória de Guimarães. In May 2019, at the end of his only campaign at the Estádio D. Afonso Henriques, he secured for them fifth place and a spot in the UEFA Europa League at the expense of neighbours Moreirense.

=== Shakhtar Donetsk ===
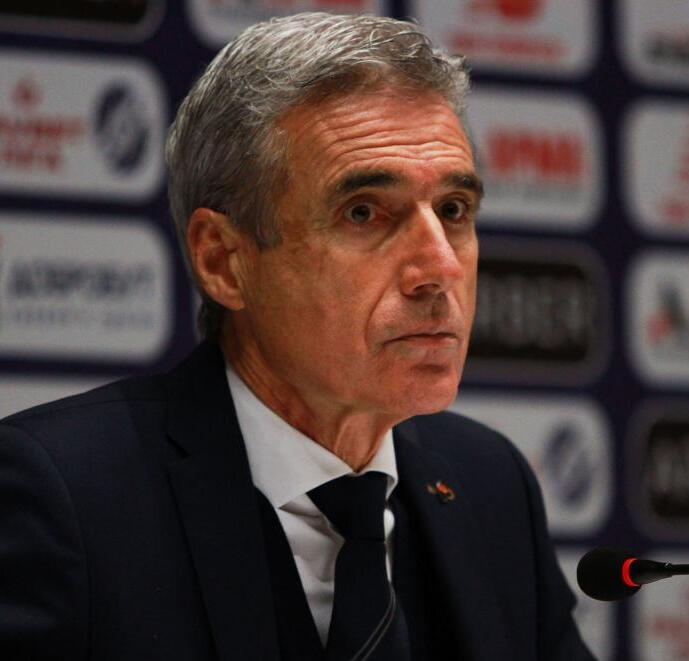
Castro during a press conference as manager of Shakhtar Donetsk in 2020

On 12 June 2019, Castro signed a two-year contract at Shakhtar Donetsk as a replacement for compatriot Paulo Fonseca who left for Roma after winning three Ukrainian Premier League championships in a row. In his first season in Eastern Europe, the team's hopes of a sixth consecutive national cup were thwarted in the last 16 by Dynamo Kyiv, but they did win a fourth league title in a row and reached the semi-finals of the Europa League.

In the 2020–21 edition of the UEFA Champions League, Castro led Shakhtar to win twice over Real Madrid in the group stages, yet they eventually finished third in the group and dropped into the Europa League, where they were eliminated in the round of 16 by Fonseca's Roma. In April 2021, with the domestic title all but taken by their rivals Dynamo, he announced that he would leave at the end of the campaign. He ended his tenure on 9 May with a 1–0 win over Inhulets Petrove. In the Ukrainian Cup, they had a bye to the quarter-finals, where they lost 1–0 after extra time at second-tier Ahrobiznes Volochysk.

On 12 May 2021, Shakhtar announced that Castro would be leaving the club after two years in charge.

=== Al-Duhail ===
Castro agreed to a one-year contract with Al-Duhail of the Qatar Stars League on 10 August 2021. On 18 March 2022, immediately after having won the Emir Cup by defeating Al-Gharafa 5–1, he left by mutual consent.

=== Botafogo ===
On 25 March 2022, Castro was named head coach of Botafogo in the Brazilian Série A, on a two-year deal. A year later, during his debut campaign in the Campeonato Carioca, the team won the Taça Rio with a 7–3 aggregate win over Audax Rio de Janeiro.

Castro led his side to their best-ever Série A start in eight rounds, only behind Palmeiras' feat in the 2019 edition. On 30 June 2023, he left after accepting an offer from a foreign club.

=== Al-Nassr ===
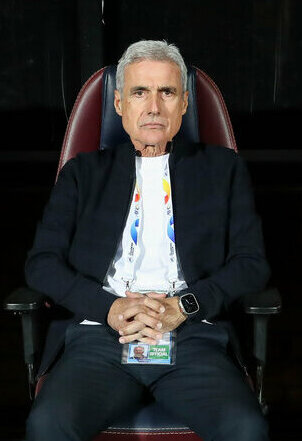
Castro on the bench for Al-Nassr against Persepolis in September 2023

On 6 July 2023, Castro was appointed at Al-Nassr of the Saudi Pro League, replacing the dismissed Rudi Garcia. On 12 August, they claimed the Arab Club Champions Cup following a 2–1 victory against Al Hilal. He started the AFC Champions League campaign with a 2–0 win at Iran's Persepolis on 19 September. In spite of star player Cristiano Ronaldo leading the scoring charts with a league all-time best 35 goals, his side finished second to the same opposition, losing the final of the King's Cup against that very team following a penalty shootout.

Castro was dismissed on 17 September 2024, after a streak of disappointing performances.

=== Al Wasl ===
On 4 June 2025, Castro signed a contract with UAE Pro League club Al Wasl. He left in November by mutual agreement.

=== Grêmio ===
On 12 December 2025, Castro returned to Brazil after being named head coach of Grêmio on a two-year deal. He led his team to victory in the Campeonato Gaúcho the following 8 March, beating Internacional 4–1 on aggregate.

On 13 September 2026, with the side nearing the relegation zone, Castro was sacked.

== Managerial statistics ==
As of match played 12 September 2026

Managerial record by team and tenure
Team	Nat	From	To	Record							
Team	Nat	From	To	G	W	D	L	GF	GA	GD	Win %
Águeda	(Portugal)	2 June 1998	21 February 2000	61	28	14	19	89	73	+16	45.90
Mealhada	(Portugal)	17 May 2000	30 June 2001	30	18	9	3	73	18	+55	60.00
Estarreja	(Portugal)	30 June 2001	22 May 2003	79	42	13	24	145	99	+46	53.16
Sanjoanense	(Portugal)	22 May 2003	16 September 2004	45	22	11	12	67	47	+20	48.89
Penafiel	(Portugal)	16 September 2004	4 June 2006	70	17	13	40	71	114	−43	24.29
Porto B	(Portugal)	1 July 2013	4 March 2014	32	18	6	8	39	26	+13	56.25
Porto	(Portugal)	5 March 2014	10 May 2014	16	9	2	5	25	18	+7	56.25
Porto B	(Portugal)	11 May 2014	12 November 2016	106	48	22	36	166	133	+33	45.28
Rio Ave	(Portugal)	12 November 2016	1 June 2017	27	13	5	9	34	26	+8	48.15
Chaves	(Portugal)	1 June 2017	20 May 2018	37	14	8	15	51	60	−9	37.84
Vitória Guimarães	(Portugal)	20 May 2018	12 June 2019	39	18	7	14	56	37	+19	46.15
Shakhtar Donetsk	(Ukraine)	12 June 2019	9 May 2021	84	50	17	17	168	94	+74	59.52
Al-Duhail	(Qatar)	11 August 2021	18 March 2022	26	18	5	3	75	30	+45	69.23
Botafogo	(Brazil)	25 March 2022	30 June 2023	80	42	15	23	115	74	+41	52.50
Al-Nassr	(Saudi Arabia)	6 July 2023	17 September 2024	63	44	12	7	161	74	+87	69.84
Al Wasl	(United Arab Emirates)	4 June 2025	5 November 2025	14	9	4	1	33	13	+20	64.29
Grêmio	(Brazil)	12 December 2025	13 September 2026	51	19	15	17	69	53	+16	37.25
Total				859	429	177	253	1,436	994	+442	49.94

== Honours ==
=== Manager ===
Estarreja

- Terceira Divisão: 2002–03

Porto B

- LigaPro: 2015–16

Shakhtar Donetsk

- Ukrainian Premier League: 2019–20

Al-Duhail

- Emir of Qatar Cup: 2022

Botafogo

- Taça Rio: 2023

Al-Nassr

- Arab Club Champions Cup: 2023

Grêmio

- Campeonato Gaúcho: 2026

Individual

- Saudi Pro League Manager of the Month: September 2023
