= 2026 Campeonato Gaúcho =

Campeonato Gaúcho
- Season: 2026
- Dates: 10 January – 8 March 2026
- Champions: Grêmio
- Relegated: Avenida; Internacional de Santa Maria
- Matches: 64
- Goals: 146 (2.28 per match)
- Top goalscorer: Wellisson and Fabinho Polhão (6 goals each)

The 2026 Campeonato da Primeira Divisão de Futebol Profissional da FGF - Divisão Especial - Série A1, better known as the 2026 Campeonato Gaúcho (officially the Gauchão Superbet 2026 for sponsorship reasons), was the 106th season of Rio Grande do Sul's top flight football league. The competition was played from 10 January to 8 March 2026, with 12 clubs contesting the tournament.

Internacional are the defending champions.

== Format ==
For the Qualifying Phase, the teams were divided into 2 groups, with 6 participants each, according to a draw held during the Technical Council. In the Qualifying Phase, the teams from one group will play against the teams from the other group, in a single round, with no matches between teams from the same group. The top 4 teams from each group qualify for the Quarter-Final Phase. The teams ranked 5th and 6th in each group at the end of the Qualifying Phase will compete in the 9th to 12th Quadrangular for permanence in the 1st division. The Quarter-Final Phase will bring together the 4 best-placed teams from each group in the Qualifying Phase, divided into 4 groups, where the teams will face each other in a single game, competing for places in the Semi-Final. The home field advantage for the single game of the Quarter-Final Phase will belong to the teams ranked 1st and 2nd in each group at the end of the Qualifying Phase. The four teams eliminated in the Quarter-Final Phase will compete for the Farroupilha Trophy, whose winner will secure a spot in the 2027 Copa do Brasil.

The Semi-Final Phase will bring together the 4 winning teams from the Quarter-Final Phase matches, divided into 2 groups, where they will face each other in 2 games (home and away), to determine the teams that qualify for the Final Phase.

The home advantage for the second game of the Semi-Final Phase will belong to the two teams with the best records among the competitors in this phase, in the sum of the Qualifying Phase with the points earned in the Quarter-Final Phase.

SEMIFINAL 1 - GROUP “G” – 4th best record vs. 1st best record SEMIFINAL 2 - GROUP “H” – 3rd best record vs. 2nd best record The Final will be played over two legs (home and away) between the winning teams of Semi-final 1 and Semi-final 2. The home advantage for the second leg of the Final will go to the team that has had the best record since the Qualifying Phase, adding the points obtained in the Quarter-final and Semi-final phases.

== Teams ==
A total of 12 teams competed in the 2026 Série A1 season.

Club	City	Stadium	Capacity	Pos. in 2025	1st season	Titles	Last title	First title
Avenida	Santa Cruz do Sul	Estádio dos Eucaliptos	3,600	9th	1979	—	—	—
Caxias	Caxias do Sul	Centenário	22,132	4th	1961	1	2000	2000
Grêmio	Porto Alegre	Arena do Grêmio	55,662	2nd	1919	43	2024	1922
Guarany de Bagé	Bagé	Estrela D'Alva	10,000	6th	1919	2	1938	1920
Internacional	Porto Alegre	Beira-Rio	50,128	1st	1927	46	2025	1927
Internacional de Santa Maria	Santa Maria	Presidente Vargas	12,000	2nd (2nd division)	1954	—	—	—
Juventude	Caxias do Sul	Alfredo Jaconi	19,924	3rd	1925	1	1998	1998
Monsoon	Porto Alegre	Estádio do Vale	5,196	8th	2025	—	—	—
Novo Hamburgo	Novo Hamburgo	Estádio do Vale	5,196	1st (2nd division)	1930	1	2017	2017
São José	Porto Alegre	Passo D'Areia	10,646	10th	1961	—	—	—
São Luiz	Ijuí	19 de Outubro	5,217	7th	1974	—	—	—
Ypiranga	Erechim	Colosso da Lagoa	22,000	5th	1968	—	—	—

Location of teams in 2026 Campeonato Gaúcho

=== Personnel ===
Club	Head coach
Avenida	Gabriel Dutra
Caxias	Fernando Marchiori
Grêmio	Luís Castro
Guarany de Bagé	Wiliam Campos
Internacional	Paulo Pezzolano
Internacional de Santa Maria	Bruno Coutinho
Juventude	Maurício Barbieri
Monsoon	Paulo Baier
Novo Hamburgo	Rogério Zimmermann
São José	Gabardo Júnior
São Luiz	Paulo Henrique Marques
Ypiranga	Raul Cabral

== First stage ==
=== Group A ===
Pos	Team	Pld	W	D	L	GF	GA	GD	Pts	Qualification or relegation
1	Internacional	6	5	0	1	14	5	+9	15	Knockout stage
2	Juventude	6	3	3	0	8	3	+5	12	Knockout stage
3	São José	6	2	3	1	4	3	+1	9	Knockout stage
4	São Luiz	6	1	4	1	6	10	−4	7	Knockout stage
5	Avenida	6	1	2	3	4	9	−5	5	Relegation stage
6	Guarany de Bagé	6	1	2	3	4	10	−6	5	Relegation stage

Source: FGF

=== Group B ===
Pos	Team	Pld	W	D	L	GF	GA	GD	Pts	Qualification or relegation
1	Grêmio	6	3	1	2	14	6	+8	10	Knockout stage
2	Caxias	6	2	1	3	8	5	+3	7	Knockout stage
3	Ypiranga	6	1	4	1	7	9	−2	7	Knockout stage
4	Novo Hamburgo	6	1	3	2	5	5	0	6	Knockout stage
5	Monsoon	6	1	3	2	5	11	−6	6	Relegation stage
6	Internacional de Santa Maria	6	1	2	3	1	4	−3	5	Relegation stage

Source: FGF

== Relegation stage ==
=== Standings and Results ===
Pos	Team	Pld	W	D	L	GF	GA	GD	Pts	Relegation	GUA	MON	AVE	ISM
1	Guarany de Bagé	6	2	2	2	6	7	−1	8			0–0	1–1	3–2
2	Monsoon	6	1	5	0	6	4	+2	8		2–0		1–1	1–1
3	Avenida (R)	6	1	5	0	6	5	+1	8	Relegation to Série A2	2–1	1–1		0–0
4	Internacional de Santa Maria (R)	6	0	4	2	5	7	−2	4	Relegation to Série A2	0–1	1–1	1–1	

Source: FGF
(R) Relegated

== Troféu Farroupilha ==
=== Bracket ===
Semi-finals
A3	São José	2	1	3
B4	Novo Hamburgo	3	2	5
B2	Caxias	2	0	2 (2)
A4	São Luiz (p)	1	1	2 (3)

Final
B4	Novo Hamburgo	0	1	1
A4	São Luiz	1	1	2

== Knockout stage ==
=== Quarter-finals ===
The matches was played on 6–9 February 2026.

Team 1	Score	Team 2
Caxias	0–2	Ypiranga
Grêmio	1−0	Novo Hamburgo
Internacional	3−1	São Luiz
Juventude	3−2	São José

6 February 2026
20:30 UTC-03:00

Caxias	0–2	Ypiranga
	Report	Cleiton 7'; Danielzinho 22'

Centenário, Caxias do Sul
Attendance: 3,276
Referee: Jonathan Benkenstein Pinheiro

7 February 2026
18:30 UTC-03:00

Grêmio	1–0	Novo Hamburgo
Carlos Vinícius 56' (pen.)	Report

Arena do Grêmio, Porto Alegre
Attendance: 17,517
Referee: Rafael Rodrigo Klein

8 February 2026
18:00 UTC-03:00

Internacional	3–1	São Luiz
Aguirre 3'; Bernabei 61'; Vitinho 88'	Report	Felipe Rangel 4'

Beira-Rio, Porto Alegre
Attendance: 16,669
Referee: Anderson Daronco

9 February 2026
20:00 UTC-03:00

Juventude	3–2	São José
Mandaca 78'; Gabriel Taliari 90+9'; Ray Breno 90+11'	Report	Diney 52'; Lucas Grafite 70'

Alfredo Jaconi, Caxias do Sul
Attendance: 5,339
Referee: Francisco Soares Dias

=== Semi-finals ===
The first legs was played on 15 February 2026, and the second legs was played on 21–22 February 2026.

Team 1	Agg.	Team 2	1st leg	2nd leg
Juventude	2–2 (1–4 p)	Grêmio	1–1	1–1
Internacional	7–0	Ypiranga	3–0	4–0

==== Match C1 ====
15 February 2026
17:30

Grêmio	1–1	Juventude
Tetê 39'	Report	Patryck Lanza 57'

Arena do Grêmio, Porto Alegre
Attendance: 21,740
Referee: Wagner Silveira Echevarria

22 February 2026
18:00

Juventude	1–1	Grêmio
Gabriel Taliari 24'	Report	Viery 74'
Penalties
Rodrigo Sam (penalty missed); Juan Christian (penalty missed); Mandaca (penalty scored)	1–4	Carlos Vinícius (penalty scored); Noriega (penalty scored); Gabriel Mec (penalty scored); Marlon (penalty scored)

Alfredo Jaconi, Caxias do Sul
Attendance: 12,263
Referee: Rafael Rodrigo Klein

==== Match C2 ====
15 February 2026
20:30

Ypiranga	0–3	Internacional
	Report	Brian Aguirre 3'; Thiago Maia 36'; Zé Carlos 78' (o.g.)

Colosso da Lagoa, Erechim
Attendance: 6,209
Referee: Lucas Guimarães Rechatiko Horn

21 February 2026
18:30

Internacional	4–0	Ypiranga
Borré 8'; Vitinho 67', 72'; Alerrandro 81'	Report

Beira-Rio, Porto Alegre
Attendance: 22,123
Referee: Tiago Pires Staduto

=== Finals ===
The first legs was played on 1 March 2026, and the second legs was played on 8 March 2026.

Team 1	Agg.	Team 2	1st leg	2nd leg
Internacional	1–4	Grêmio	0–3	1–1

==== Match G1 ====
===== First leg =====
1 March 2026
18:00

Grêmio	3–0	Internacional
Enamorado 39'; Amuzu 45+1'; Victor Gabriel 67' (o.g.)	Report

Arena do Grêmio, Porto Alegre
Attendance: 50,166
Referee: Anderson Daronco

===== Second leg =====
8 March 2026
18:00

Internacional	1–1	Grêmio
Alan Patrick 82' (pen.)	Report	Gustavo Martins 45+9'

Beira-Rio, Porto Alegre
Attendance: 41,251
Referee: Rafael Rodrigo Klein

== Statistics ==
=== Top scorers ===
Rank	Player	Club	Goal
1	(Brazil) Wellisson	Avenida	6
1	(Brazil) Fabinho Polhão	Monsoon	6
3	(Brazil) Carlos Vinícius	Grêmio	5
3	(Colombia) Rafael Borré	Internacional	5
3	(Brazil) Luam Parede	Novo Hamburgo	5
