= 2021 in Brazilian football =

Football in Brazil
- Season: 2021

Men's football
- Série A: Atlético Mineiro
- Série B: Botafogo
- Série C: Ituano
- Série D: Aparecidense
- Copa do Brasil: Atlético Mineiro
- Supercopa: Flamengo

Women's football
- Série A1: Corinthians
- Série A2: Red Bull Bragantino

The following article presents a summary of the 2021 football (soccer) season in Brazil, which was the 120th season of competitive football in the country.

== Campeonato Brasileiro Série A ==
The 2021 Campeonato Brasileiro Série A started on 29 May 2021 and ended on 9 December 2021.

- América Mineiro
- Athletico Paranaense
- Atlético Goianiense
- Atlético Mineiro
- Bahia
- Ceará
- Chapecoense
- Corinthians
- Cuiabá
- Flamengo
- Fluminense
- Fortaleza
- Grêmio
- Internacional
- Juventude
- Palmeiras
- Red Bull Bragantino
- Santos
- São Paulo
- Sport

Pos	Team	Pld	W	D	L	GF	GA	GD	Pts	Qualification or relegation
1	Atlético Mineiro (C)	38	26	6	6	67	34	+33	84	Qualification for Copa Libertadores group stage (Note: Palmeiras qualified for the Copa Libertadores group stage by winning the 2021 Copa Libertadores.)
2	Flamengo	38	21	8	9	69	36	+33	71	Qualification for Copa Libertadores group stage
3	Palmeiras	38	20	6	12	58	43	+15	66	Qualification for Copa Libertadores group stage
4	Fortaleza	38	17	7	14	44	45	−1	58	Qualification for Copa Libertadores group stage
5	Corinthians	38	15	12	11	40	36	+4	57	Qualification for Copa Libertadores group stage
6	Red Bull Bragantino	38	14	14	10	55	46	+9	56	Qualification for Copa Libertadores group stage
7	Fluminense	38	15	9	14	38	38	0	54	Qualification for Copa Libertadores second stage
8	América Mineiro	38	13	14	11	41	37	+4	53	Qualification for Copa Libertadores second stage
9	Atlético Goianiense	38	13	14	11	33	36	−3	53	Qualification for Copa Sudamericana group stage
10	Santos	38	12	14	12	35	40	−5	50	Qualification for Copa Sudamericana group stage
11	Ceará	38	11	17	10	39	38	+1	50	Qualification for Copa Sudamericana group stage
12	Internacional	38	12	12	14	44	42	+2	48	Qualification for Copa Sudamericana group stage
13	São Paulo	38	11	15	12	31	39	−8	48	Qualification for Copa Sudamericana group stage
14	Athletico Paranaense	38	13	8	17	41	45	−4	47	Qualification for Copa Libertadores group stage (Note: Athletico Paranaense qualified for the Copa Libertadores group stage by winning the 2021 Copa Sudamericana.)
15	Cuiabá	38	10	17	11	34	37	−3	47	Qualification for Copa Sudamericana group stage
16	Juventude	38	11	13	14	36	44	−8	46	
17	Grêmio (R)	38	12	7	19	44	51	−7	43	Relegation to Campeonato Brasileiro Série B
18	Bahia (R)	38	11	10	17	42	51	−9	43	Relegation to Campeonato Brasileiro Série B
19	Sport (R)	38	9	11	18	24	37	−13	38	Relegation to Campeonato Brasileiro Série B
20	Chapecoense (R)	38	1	12	25	27	67	−40	15	Relegation to Campeonato Brasileiro Série B

Source: CBF
Rules for classification: 1) points; 2) wins; 3) goal difference; 4) goals scored; 5) head-to-head results (only between two teams); 6) fewest red cards; 7) fewest yellow cards; 8) drawing of lots.
(C) Champions; (R) Relegated
Notes:

Atlético Mineiro won the league.

=== Relegation ===
The four worst placed teams, Grêmio, Bahia, Sport and Chapecoense, were relegated to the following year's second level.

== Campeonato Brasileiro Série B ==
The 2021 Campeonato Brasileiro Série B started on 28 May 2021 and ended on 28 November 2021.

- Avaí
- Botafogo
- Brasil de Pelotas
- Brusque
- Confiança
- Coritiba
- CRB
- Cruzeiro
- CSA
- Goiás
- Guarani
- Londrina
- Náutico
- Operário Ferroviário
- Ponte Preta
- Remo
- Sampaio Corrêa
- Vasco da Gama
- Vila Nova
- Vitória

Pos	Team	Pld	W	D	L	GF	GA	GD	Pts	Promotion or relegation
1	Botafogo (C, P)	38	20	10	8	56	31	+25	70	Promotion to 2022 Campeonato Brasileiro Série A
2	Goiás (P)	38	17	14	7	48	31	+17	65	Promotion to 2022 Campeonato Brasileiro Série A
3	Coritiba (P)	38	18	10	10	49	35	+14	64	Promotion to 2022 Campeonato Brasileiro Série A
4	Avaí (P)	38	18	10	10	44	35	+9	64	Promotion to 2022 Campeonato Brasileiro Série A
5	CSA	38	18	8	12	48	33	+15	62	
6	Guarani	38	16	12	10	54	41	+13	60	
7	CRB	38	16	12	10	47	39	+8	60	
8	Náutico	38	14	11	13	50	50	0	53	
9	Vila Nova	38	12	15	11	35	36	−1	51	
10	Vasco da Gama	38	13	10	15	43	52	−9	49	
11	Ponte Preta	38	12	13	13	39	40	−1	49	
12	Operário Ferroviário	38	13	9	16	35	46	−11	48	
13	Brusque	38	13	9	16	44	56	−12	48	
14	Cruzeiro	38	10	18	10	42	44	−2	48	
15	Sampaio Corrêa	38	12	11	15	41	42	−1	47	
16	Londrina	38	11	11	16	31	41	−10	44	
17	Remo (R)	38	11	10	17	31	42	−11	43	Relegation to 2022 Campeonato Brasileiro Série C
18	Vitória (R)	38	8	16	14	31	32	−1	40	Relegation to 2022 Campeonato Brasileiro Série C
19	Confiança (R)	38	9	10	19	35	48	−13	37	Relegation to 2022 Campeonato Brasileiro Série C
20	Brasil de Pelotas (R)	38	4	11	23	23	52	−29	23	Relegation to 2022 Campeonato Brasileiro Série C

Source: CBF
Rules for classification: 1) points; 2) wins; 3) goal difference; 4) goals scored; 5) head-to-head results (only between 2 teams); 6) fewest red cards; 7) fewest yellow cards; 8) drawing of lots.
(C) Champions; (P) Promoted; (R) Relegated

Botafogo won the league.

=== Promotion ===
The four best placed teams, Botafogo, Coritiba, Goiás and Avaí, were promoted to the following year's first level.

=== Relegation ===
The four worst placed teams, Remo, Vitória, Confiança and Brasil de Pelotas, were relegated to the following year's third level.

== Campeonato Brasileiro Série C ==
The 2021 Campeonato Brasileiro Série C started on 29 May 2021 and ended on 20 November 2021.

- Altos
- Botafogo (PB)
- Botafogo (SP)
- Criciúma
- Ferroviário
- Figueirense
- Floresta
- Ituano
- Jacuipense
- Manaus
- Mirassol
- Novorizontino
- Oeste
- Paraná
- Paysandu
- Santa Cruz
- São José (RS)
- Tombense
- Volta Redonda
- Ypiranga

The Campeonato Brasileiro Série C final was played between Ituano and Tombense.

13 November 2021

Tombense	1–1	Ituano

Almeidão, Tombos

20 November 2021

Ituano	3–0	Tombense

Estádio Novelli Júnior, Itu

Ituano won the league after beating Tombense.

=== Promotion ===
The four best placed teams, Tombense, Ituano, Criciúma and Novorizontino, were promoted to the following year's second level.

=== Relegation ===
The four worst placed teams, Jacuipense, Paraná, Santa Cruz and Oeste, were relegated to the following year's fourth level.

== Campeonato Brasileiro Série D ==
The 2021 Campeonato Brasileiro Série D started on 26 May 2021 and ended on 13 November 2021.

- 4 de Julho
- ABC
- Águia Negra
- Aimoré
- América de Natal
- Aparecidense
- Aquidauanense
- ASA
- Atlético Acreano
- Atlético Cearense
- Atlético de Alagoinhas
- Bahia de Feira
- Bangu
- Boa Esporte
- Boavista
- Brasiliense
- Caldense
- Campinense
- FC Cascavel
- Castanhal
- Caucaia
- Caxias
- Central
- Cianorte
- Esportivo
- Fast Clube
- Ferroviária
- Galvez
- Gama
- GAS
- Goianésia
- Guarany de Sobral
- Imperatriz
- Inter de Limeira
- Itabaiana
- Jaraguá
- Joinville
- Juazeirense
- Juventude Samas
- Juventus
- Madureira
- Marcílio Dias
- Moto Club
- Murici
- Nova Mutum
- Palmas
- Paragominas
- Patrocinense
- Penarol
- Picos
- Porto Velho
- Portuguesa (SP)
- Real Ariquemes
- Retrô
- Rio Branco (ES)
- Rio Branco (PR)
- Rio Branco de Venda Nova
- Santana
- Santo André
- São Bento
- São Raimundo (RR)
- Sergipe
- Sousa
- Tocantinópolis
- Treze
- Uberlândia
- União Rondonópolis
- Ypiranga (AP)

Salgueiro declined to participate in the Série D. They were replaced by Central.

The Campeonato Brasileiro Série D final was played between Aparecidense and Campinense.

6 November 2021

Campinense	0–1	Aparecidense

Amigão, Campina Grande

13 November 2021

Aparecidense	1–1	Campinense

Estádio Annibal Batista de Toledo, Aparecida de Goiânia

Aparecidense won the league after defeating Campinense.

=== Promotion ===
The four best placed teams, Aparecidense, Campinense, ABC and Atlético Cearense, were promoted to the following year's third level.

== Super cup ==
=== Supercopa do Brasil ===
The 2021 Supercopa do Brasil was played on 11 April 2021 between Flamengo and Palmeiras.

11 April 2021

Flamengo	2–2	Palmeiras
Penalties
	6–5

Estádio Nacional Mané Garrincha, Brasília

Flamengo won the super cup after defeating Palmeiras.

== Domestic cups ==
=== Copa do Brasil ===
The 2021 Copa do Brasil started on 9 March 2021 and ended on 15 December 2021. The Copa do Brasil final was played between Athletico Paranaense and Atlético Mineiro.

12 December 2021

Atlético Mineiro	4–0	Athletico Paranaense

Mineirão, Belo Horizonte

15 December 2021

Athletico Paranaense	1–2	Atlético Mineiro

Arena da Baixada, Curitiba

Atlético Mineiro won the cup after defeating Athletico Paranaense.

=== Copa do Nordeste ===
The competition featured 16 clubs from the Northeastern region. It started on 27 February 2021 and ended on 8 May 2021. The Copa do Nordeste final was played between Bahia and Ceará.

1 May 2021

Bahia	0–1	Ceará

Estádio de Pituaçu, Salvador

8 May 2021

Ceará	1–2	Bahia
Penalties
	2–4

Castelão, Fortaleza

Bahia won the cup after defeating Ceará.

=== Copa Verde ===
The competition featured 24 clubs from the North and Central-West regions, including two teams from Espírito Santo. It started on 13 October 2021 and ended on 11 December 2021. The Copa Verde final was played between Vila Nova and Remo.

8 December 2021

Vila Nova	0–0	Remo

Estádio Onésio Brasileiro Alvarenga, Goiânia

11 December 2021

Remo	0–0	Vila Nova
Penalties
	4–2

Baenão, Belém

Remo won the cup after defeating Vila Nova.

== State championship champions ==
State	Champions
(Acre (state)) Acre	Rio Branco
Alagoas	CSA
Amapá	Trem
(Amazonas (Brazilian state)) Amazonas	Manaus
Bahia	Atlético de Alagoinhas
Ceará	Fortaleza
(Federal District (Brazil)) Distrito Federal	Brasiliense
Espírito Santo	Real Noroeste
Goiás	Grêmio Anápolis
Maranhão	Sampaio Corrêa
Mato Grosso	Cuiabá
Mato Grosso do Sul	Costa Rica
Minas Gerais	Atlético Mineiro
Pará	Paysandu
Paraíba	Campinense
(Paraná (state)) Paraná	Londrina
Pernambuco	Náutico
Piauí	Altos
(Rio de Janeiro (state)) Rio de Janeiro	Flamengo
Rio Grande do Norte	Globo
Rio Grande do Sul	Grêmio
Rondônia	Porto Velho
Roraima	São Raimundo
(Santa Catarina (state)) Santa Catarina	Avaí
(São Paulo (state)) São Paulo	São Paulo
Sergipe	Sergipe
Tocantins	Tocantinópolis

== State cup competition champions ==
Competition	Champions
Copa Alagoas	ASA
Copa Espírito Santo	Nova Venécia
Copa Fares Lopes	Icasa
Copa FGF	Glória
Copa FMF (MA)	Tuntum
Copa FMF (MT)	União Rondonópolis
Copa Paulista	São Bernardo
Copa Rio	Pérolas Negras
Copa Santa Catarina	Figueirense

== Youth competition champions ==
Competition	Champions
Campeonato Brasileiro de Aspirantes	Grêmio
Campeonato Brasileiro Sub-20	Internacional
Copa do Brasil Sub-20	Coritiba
Supercopa do Brasil Sub-20	Internacional
Campeonato Brasileiro Sub-17	Flamengo
Copa do Brasil Sub-17^{(1)}	Flamengo
Supercopa do Brasil Sub-17	Flamengo
Copa RS de Futebol Sub-20	Cancelled
Copa Santiago de Futebol Juvenil	Cancelled
Copa São Paulo de Futebol Júnior	Cancelled

^{(1)} The Copa Nacional do Espírito Santo Sub-17, between 2008 and 2012, was named Copa Brasil Sub-17. The similar named Copa do Brasil Sub-17 is organized by the Brazilian Football Confederation and it was first played in 2013.

== Brazilian clubs in international competitions ==
Team	2021 Copa Libertadores	2021 Copa Sudamericana	2021 Recopa Sudamericana	2021 FIFA Club World Cup
Athletico Paranaense	N/A	Champions defeated (Brazil) Red Bull Bragantino	N/A	N/A
Atlético Goianiense	N/A	Eliminated in the Group Stage	N/A	N/A
Atlético Mineiro	Semi-finals eliminated by (Brazil) Palmeiras	N/A	N/A	N/A
Bahia	N/A	Eliminated in the Group Stage	N/A	N/A
Ceará	N/A	Eliminated in the Group Stage	N/A	N/A
Corinthians	N/A	Eliminated in the Group Stage	N/A	N/A
Flamengo	Runners-up lost to (Brazil) Palmeiras	N/A	N/A	N/A
Fluminense	Quarter-finals eliminated by (Ecuador) Barcelona	N/A	N/A	N/A
Grêmio	Third Stage eliminated by (Ecuador) Independiente del Valle	Round of 16 eliminated by (Ecuador) LDU Quito	N/A	N/A
Internacional	Round of 16 eliminated by (Paraguay) Olimpia	N/A	N/A	N/A
Palmeiras	Champions defeated (Brazil) Flamengo	N/A	Runners-up lost to (Argentina) Defensa y Justicia	Runners-up lost to (England) Chelsea
Red Bull Bragantino	N/A	Runners-up lost to (Brazil) Athletico Paranaense	N/A	N/A
Santos	Eliminated in the Group Stage	Quarter-finals eliminated by (Paraguay) Libertad	N/A	N/A
São Paulo	Quarter-finals eliminated by (Brazil) Palmeiras	N/A	N/A	N/A

== National team ==
The following table lists all the games played by the Brazilian national team in official competitions and friendly matches during 2021.

=== FIFA World Cup qualification ===
4 June	Brazil	2–0	Ecuador	Porto Alegre, Brazil
21:30 UTC−3	Richarlison 65'; Neymar 90+4' (pen.)	Report		Stadium: Estádio Beira-Rio; Attendance: 0 Referee: Alexis Herrera (Venezuela)

8 June	Paraguay	0–2	Brazil	Asunción, Paraguay
21:30 UTC−3		Report	Neymar 4'; Lucas Paquetá 90+3'	Stadium: Estadio Defensores del Chaco; Attendance: 0 Referee: Patricio Loustau (Argentina)

2 September	Chile	0–1	Brazil	Santiago, Chile
22:00 UTC−3		Report	Éverton Ribeiro 64'	Stadium: Estadio Monumental David Arellano; Attendance: 8,853; Referee: Diego Haro (Peru)

5 September	Brazil	Annulled ^{1}	Argentina	São Paulo, Brazil
16:00 UTC−3		Report		Stadium: Neo Química Arena; Referee: Jesús Valenzuela (Venezuela)

9 September	Brazil	2–0	Peru	São Lourenço da Mata, Brazil
21:30 UTC−3	Éverton Ribeiro 15'; Neymar 40'	Report		Stadium: Arena Pernambuco; Attendance: 0 Referee: Wilmar Roldán (Colombia)

7 October	Venezuela	1–3	Brazil	Caracas, Venezuela
20:30 UTC−3	Ramírez 11'	Report	Marquinhos 71'; Gabriel 85' (pen.); Antony 90+5'	Stadium: Olympic Stadium; Referee: Kevin Ortega (Peru)

10 October	Colombia	0–0	Brazil	Barranquilla, Colombia
18:00 UTC−3		Report		Stadium: Estadio Metropolitano Roberto Meléndez; Referee: Patricio Loustau (Argentina)

14 October	Brazil	4–1	Uruguay	Manaus, Brazil
21:30 UTC−3	Neymar 10'; Raphinha 18', 58'; Gabriel 83'	Report	Suárez 77'	Stadium: Arena da Amazônia; Referee: Fernando Rapallini (Argentina)

11 November	Brazil	1–0	Colombia	São Paulo, Brazil
21:30 UTC−3	Lucas Paquetá 72'	Report		Stadium: Neo Química Arena; Referee: Roberto Tobar (Chile)

16 November	Argentina	0–0	Brazil	San Juan, Argentina
20:30 UTC−3		Report		Stadium: Estadio San Juan del Bicentenario; Referee: Andrés Cunha (Uruguay)

1. The match was suspended after Anvisa stopped it after 5 minutes at 0–0 accusing four Argentine players of violating the COVID quarantine rules. On 14 February 2022, FIFA annulled the match being initially rescheduled to September 2022 at a location to be defined by the CBF. Finally the match was cancelled by FIFA on 16 August 2022.

=== Copa América ===
13 June Group B	Brazil	3–0	Venezuela	Brasília, Brazil
18:00 UTC−3	Marquinhos 23'; Neymar 64' (pen.); Gabriel 89'	Report		Stadium: Estádio Nacional Mané Garrincha; Attendance: 0 Referee: Esteban Ostojich (Uruguay)

17 June Group B	Brazil	4–0	Peru	Rio de Janeiro, Brazil
21:00 UTC−3	Alex Sandro 12'; Neymar 68'; Éverton Ribeiro 89'; Richarlison 90+3'	Report		Stadium: Estádio Olímpico Nilton Santos; Attendance: 0 Referee: Patricio Loustau (Argentina)

23 June Group B	Brazil	2–1	Colombia	Rio de Janeiro, Brazil
21:00 UTC−3	Roberto Firmino 78'; Casemiro 90+10'	Report	Díaz 10'	Stadium: Estádio Olímpico Nilton Santos; Attendance: 0 Referee: Néstor Pitana (Argentina)

27 June Group B	Brazil	1–1	Ecuador	Goiânia, Brazil
18:00 UTC−3	Éder Militão 37'	Report	Mena 53'	Stadium: Estádio Olímpico Pedro Ludovico; Attendance: 0 Referee: Roberto Tobar (Chile)

2 July Quarter-finals	Brazil	1–0	Chile	Rio de Janeiro, Brazil
21:00 UTC−3	Lucas Paquetá 46'	Report		Stadium: Estádio Olímpico Nilton Santos; Attendance: 0 Referee: Patricio Loustau (Argentina)

5 July Semi-finals	Brazil	1–0	Peru	Rio de Janeiro, Brazil
20:00 UTC−3	Lucas Paquetá 35'	Report		Stadium: Estádio Olímpico Nilton Santos; Attendance: 0 Referee: Roberto Tobar (Chile)

10 July Final	Argentina	1–0	Brazil	Rio de Janeiro, Brazil
21:00 UTC−3	Di María 22'	Report		Stadium: Maracanã; Attendance: 5,500; Referee: Esteban Ostojich (Uruguay)

Competition	Performance
Copa América	Runners-up

== Women's football ==
=== Campeonato Brasileiro de Futebol Feminino Série A1 ===
The 2021 Campeonato Brasileiro de Futebol Feminino Série A1 started on 17 April 2021 and ended on 26 September 2021.

- Bahia
- Botafogo
- Corinthians
- Cruzeiro
- Ferroviária
- Flamengo/Marinha
- Grêmio
- Internacional
- Kindermann/Avaí
- Minas/ICESP
- Napoli
- Palmeiras
- Real Brasília
- Santos
- São José
- São Paulo

The Campeonato Brasileiro de Futebol Feminino Série A1 final was played between Corinthians and Palmeiras.

12 September 2021

Palmeiras	0–1	Corinthians

Allianz Parque, São Paulo

26 September 2021

Corinthians	3–1	Palmeiras

Neo Química Arena, São Paulo

Corinthians won the league after defeating Palmeiras.

==== Relegation ====
The four worst placed teams, Botafogo, Minas/ICESP, Napoli and Bahia, were relegated to the following year's second level.

=== Campeonato Brasileiro de Futebol Feminino Série A2 ===
The 2021 Campeonato Brasileiro de Futebol Feminino Série A2 started on 15 May 2021 and ended on 7 September 2021.

- Aliança
- América de Natal
- América Mineiro
- Assermurb
- Athletico Paranaense
- Atlético Goianiense
- Atlético Mineiro
- Botafogo (PB)
- Brasil de Farroupilha
- Ceará
- CEFAMA
- Chapecoense
- CRESSPOM
- Criciúma
- ESMAC
- Fluminense
- Fortaleza
- Iranduba
- JC
- Juventude (BA)
- Mixto
- Náutico
- Oratório
- Paraíso
- Ponte Preta
- Real Ariquemes
- Red Bull Bragantino
- Santos Dumont
- São Raimundo (RR)
- SERC/UCDB
- Sport
- Tiradentes
- UDA
- Vasco da Gama
- Vila Nova (ES)
- Vitória

Audax declined to participate in the Série A2. They were replaced by Atlético Goianiense.
Complying with the guidelines of the CBF, the federations that did not held a women's state league in the 2020 season awarded their 2021 Serie A2 berths to the best placed teams in the 2019 state league not already qualified. Therefore, UDA (Alagoas), Juventude (Bahia), Vila Nova (Espírito Santo), Tiradentes (Piauí), Criciúma (Santa Catarina) and Santos Dumont (Sergipe) qualified for the Série A2. Goiás (2019 Campeonato Goiano champions) declined to participate in the Série A2. They were replaced by Aliança. Although Atlético Acreano won the 2019 Campeonato Acreano, the Federação de Futebol do Acre awarded the berth to the runners-up Assermurb.

The Campeonato Brasileiro de Futebol Feminino Série A2 final was played between Red Bull Bragantino and Atlético Mineiro.

30 August 2021

Red Bull Bragantino	0–0	Atlético Mineiro

Estádio Nabi Abi Chedid, Bragança Paulista

7 September 2021

Atlético Mineiro	0–0	Red Bull Bragantino
Penalties
	2–4

Estádio Independência, Belo Horizonte

Red Bull Bragantino won the league after defeating Atlético Mineiro.

==== Promotion ====
The four best placed teams, Red Bull Bragantino, Atlético Mineiro, ESMAC and CRESSPOM, were promoted to the following year's first level.

=== Domestic competition champions ===
State	Champions
(Acre (state)) Acre	Rio Branco
Alagoas	CRB
Amapá	Ypiranga
(Amazonas (Brazilian state)) Amazonas	3B da Amazônia
Bahia	Bahia
Ceará	Ceará
(Federal District (Brazil)) Distrito Federal	Real Brasília
Espírito Santo	Vila Nova
Goiás	Vila Nova/UNIVERSO
Maranhão	Cancelled
Mato Grosso	Mixto
Mato Grosso do Sul	Operário
Minas Gerais	Atlético Mineiro
Pará	Remo
Paraíba	VF4
(Paraná (state)) Paraná	Athletico Paranaense
Pernambuco	Náutico
Piauí	Teresina
(Rio de Janeiro (state)) Rio de Janeiro	Flamengo/Marinha
Rio Grande do Norte	União
Rio Grande do Sul	Internacional
Rondônia	Real Ariquemes
Roraima	São Raimundo
(Santa Catarina (state)) Santa Catarina	Kindermann/Avaí
(São Paulo (state)) São Paulo	Corinthians
Sergipe	Estanciano
Tocantins	Paraíso

=== State cup competition champions ===
Competition	Champions
Copa Paulista de Futebol Feminino	Palmeiras

=== Youth competition champions ===
Competition	Champions
Campeonato Brasileiro de Futebol Feminino Sub-18	São Paulo
Campeonato Brasileiro de Futebol Feminino Sub-16	Corinthians

=== Brazilian clubs in international competitions ===
Team	2021 Copa Libertadores Femenina
Corinthians	Champions defeated (Colombia) Santa Fe
Ferroviária	Third place defeated (Uruguay) Nacional
Kindermann/Avaí	Quarter-finals eliminated by (Colombia) Santa Fe

=== National team ===
The following table lists all the games played by the Brazil women's national football team in official competitions and friendly matches during 2021.

The Brazil women's national football team competed in the following competitions in 2021:

==== Friendlies ====
11 June	Brazil	3–0	Russia	Cartagena, Spain
21:00 (CEST)	Bruna Benites 41', 63'; Andressa Alves 80'	Report		Stadium: Estadio Cartagonova; Referee: Miriama Matulová (Slovakia)

14 June	Brazil	0–0	Canada	Cartagena, Spain
21:00 (CEST)		Report		Stadium: Estadio Cartagonova; Referee: Zuzana Valentová (Slovakia)

17 September	Brazil	3–1	Argentina	Campina Grande, Brazil
16:00 (BRT)	Debinha 37'; Nycole Raysla 49'; Angelina 58'	Report	Bonsegundo 73'	Stadium: Amigão; Attendance: 400; Referee: Deborah Cecília Cruz Correia (Brazil)

20 September	Brazil	4–1	Argentina	João Pessoa, Brazil
16:00 (BRT)	Kerolin 19'; Marta 37'; Debinha 47'; Yasmim 51'	Report	Larroquette 50'	Stadium: Almeidão; Attendance: 700; Referee: Thayslane de Melo Costa (Brazil)

23 October	Australia	3–1	Brazil	Parramatta, Australia
19:45 (AEDT)	Polkinghorne 38'; Fowler 66' van Egmond 80'	Report	Adriana 68'	Stadium: CommBank Stadium; Attendance: 15,270; Referee: Esther Staubli (Switzerland)

26 October	Australia	2–2	Brazil	Parramatta, Australia
20:00 (AEDT)	Polkinghorne 10'; Kerr 53'	Report	Érika 64'; Debinha 71'	Stadium: CommBank Stadium; Attendance: 12,087; Referee: Désirée Grundbacher (Switzerland)

==== 2021 SheBelieves Cup ====
18 February	Brazil	4–1	Argentina	Orlando, United States
16:05 (EST)	Marta 30' (pen.); Debinha 47'; Adriana 54'; Geyse 84'	Report	Larroquette 60'	Stadium: Exploria Stadium; Attendance: 1,119; Referee: Katja Koroleva (United States)

21 February	United States	2–0	Brazil	Orlando, United States
15:05 (EST)	Press 11'; Rapinoe 88'	Report		Stadium: Exploria Stadium; Attendance: 4,000; Referee: Melissa Borjas (Honduras)

24 February	Canada	0–2	Brazil	Orlando, United States
16:05 (EST)		Report	Debinha 15'; Julia Bianchi 39'	Stadium: Exploria Stadium; Attendance: 1,409; Referee: Danielle Chesky (United States)

==== 2020 Summer Olympics ====
21 July Group F	China	0–5	Brazil	Rifu, Japan
17:00 (JST)		Report	Marta 9', 74'; Debinha 22'; Andressa Alves 80' (pen.); Bia Zaneratto 89'	Stadium: Miyagi Stadium; Attendance: 1,645; Referee: Kateryna Monzul (Ukraine)

24 July Group F	Netherlands	3–3	Brazil	Rifu, Japan
20:00 (JST)	Miedema 3', 59'; Janssen 79'	Report	Debinha 17'; Marta 64' (pen.); Ludmila 68'	Stadium: Miyagi Stadium; Attendance: 2,621; Referee: Kate Jacewicz (Australia)

27 July Group F	Brazil	1–0	Zambia	Saitama, Japan
20:30 (JST)	Andressa Alves 19'	Report		Stadium: Saitama Stadium 2002; Attendance: 0 Referee: Yoshimi Yamashita (Japan)

30 July Quarter-finals	Canada	0–0 (a.e.t.) (4–3 p)	Brazil	Rifu, Japan
17:00 (JST)		Report		Stadium: Miyagi Stadium; Attendance: 3,403; Referee: Stéphanie Frappart (France)
	Penalties
	Sinclair (penalty missed); Fleming (penalty scored); Lawrence (penalty scored); Leon (penalty scored); Gilles (penalty scored)		(penalty scored) Marta; (penalty scored) Debinha; (penalty scored) Érika; (penalty missed) Andressa Alves; (penalty missed) Rafaelle

==== 2021 International Women's Football Tournament ====
25 November	Brazil	6–1	India	Manaus, Brazil
21:00 (AMT)	Debinha 1'; Giovana 36'; Ary Borges 51', 80'; Kerolin 53'; Geyse 75'	Report	Manisha 8'	Stadium: Arena da Amazônia; Attendance: 3,194; Referee: Daiane Caroline Muniz dos Santos (Brazil)

28 November	Brazil	4–1	Venezuela	Manaus, Brazil
20:00 (AMT)	Kerolin 19', 39'; Gabi Nunes 24'; Debinha 45+1'	Report	Villamizar 2'	Stadium: Arena da Amazônia; Referee: Charly Wendy Straub Deretti (Brazil)

1 December	Brazil	2–0	Chile	Manaus, Brazil
20:00 (AMT)	Kerolin 50'; Giovana 83'	Report		Stadium: Arena da Amazônia; Referee: Edina Alves Batista (Brazil)

Competition	Performance
SheBelieves Cup	Runners-up
Summer Olympics	Quarter-finals eliminated by Canada
International Women's Football Tournament	Champions
