= 2019 in Brazilian football =

Football in Brazil
- Season: 2019

Men's football
- Série A: Flamengo
- Série B: Bragantino
- Série C: Náutico
- Série D: Brusque
- Copa do Brasil: Athletico Paranaense

Women's football
- Série A1: Ferroviária
- Série A2: São Paulo

The following article presents a summary of the 2019 football (soccer) season in Brazil, which was the 118th season of competitive football in the country.

== Campeonato Brasileiro Série A ==
The 2019 Campeonato Brasileiro Série A started on April 27, 2019, and ended on December 8, 2019.

- Athletico Paranaense
- Atlético Mineiro
- Avaí
- Bahia
- Botafogo
- Ceará
- Chapecoense
- Corinthians
- Cruzeiro
- CSA
- Flamengo
- Fortaleza
- Fluminense
- Goiás
- Grêmio
- Internacional
- Palmeiras
- Santos
- São Paulo
- Vasco da Gama

Pos	Team	Pld	W	D	L	GF	GA	GD	Pts	Qualification or relegation
1	Flamengo (C)	38	28	6	4	86	37	+49	90	Qualification for Copa Libertadores group stage (Note: Flamengo qualified for the Copa Libertadores group stage by winning the 2019 Copa Libertadores. Athletico Paranaense qualified for the Copa Libertadores group stage by winning the 2019 Copa do Brasil.)
2	Santos	38	22	8	8	60	33	+27	74	Qualification for Copa Libertadores group stage
3	Palmeiras	38	21	11	6	61	32	+29	74	Qualification for Copa Libertadores group stage
4	Grêmio	38	19	8	11	64	39	+25	65	Qualification for Copa Libertadores group stage
5	Athletico Paranaense	38	18	10	10	51	32	+19	64	Qualification for Copa Libertadores group stage
6	São Paulo	38	17	12	9	39	30	+9	63	Qualification for Copa Libertadores group stage
7	Internacional	38	16	9	13	44	39	+5	57	Qualification for Copa Libertadores second stage
8	Corinthians	38	14	14	10	42	34	+8	56	Qualification for Copa Libertadores second stage
9	Fortaleza	38	15	8	15	50	49	+1	53	Qualification for Copa Sudamericana first stage
10	Goiás	38	15	7	16	46	64	−18	52	Qualification for Copa Sudamericana first stage
11	Bahia	38	12	13	13	44	43	+1	49	Qualification for Copa Sudamericana first stage
12	Vasco da Gama	38	12	13	13	39	45	−6	49	Qualification for Copa Sudamericana first stage
13	Atlético Mineiro	38	13	9	16	45	49	−4	48	Qualification for Copa Sudamericana first stage
14	Fluminense	38	12	10	16	38	46	−8	46	Qualification for Copa Sudamericana first stage
15	Botafogo	38	13	4	21	31	45	−14	43	
16	Ceará	38	10	9	19	36	41	−5	39	
17	Cruzeiro (R)	38	7	15	16	27	46	−19	36	Relegation to Campeonato Brasileiro Série B
18	CSA (R)	38	8	8	22	24	58	−34	32	Relegation to Campeonato Brasileiro Série B
19	Chapecoense (R)	38	7	11	20	31	52	−21	32	Relegation to Campeonato Brasileiro Série B
20	Avaí (R)	38	3	11	24	18	62	−44	20	Relegation to Campeonato Brasileiro Série B

Source: CBF
Rules for classification: 1) points; 2) wins; 3) goal difference; 4) goals scored; 5) head-to-head results; 6) least red cards received; 7) least yellow cards received; 8) draw.
(C) Champions; (R) Relegated
Notes:

Flamengo won the league.

=== Relegation ===
The four worst placed teams, Cruzeiro, CSA, Chapecoense and Avaí, were relegated to the following year's second level.

== Campeonato Brasileiro Série B ==
The 2019 Campeonato Brasileiro Série B started on April 26, 2019, and ended on November 30, 2019.

- América Mineiro
- Atlético Goianiense
- Botafogo (SP)
- Bragantino
- Brasil de Pelotas
- Coritiba
- CRB
- Criciúma
- Cuiabá
- Figueirense
- Guarani
- Londrina
- Oeste
- Operário Ferroviário
- Paraná
- Ponte Preta
- São Bento
- Sport
- Vila Nova
- Vitória

Pos	Team	Pld	W	D	L	GF	GA	GD	Pts	Promotion or relegation
1	Bragantino (C, P)	38	22	9	7	64	27	+37	75	Promotion to Campeonato Brasileiro Série A
2	Sport (P)	38	17	17	4	49	29	+20	68	Promotion to Campeonato Brasileiro Série A
3	Coritiba (P)	38	18	12	8	48	34	+14	66	Promotion to Campeonato Brasileiro Série A
4	Atlético Goianiense (P)	38	15	17	6	44	29	+15	62	Promotion to Campeonato Brasileiro Série A
5	América Mineiro	38	17	10	11	42	34	+8	61	
6	Paraná	38	14	14	10	34	33	+1	56	
7	CRB	38	15	10	13	44	43	+1	55	
8	Cuiabá	38	13	13	12	43	40	+3	52	
9	Botafogo-SP	38	13	11	14	38	38	0	50	
10	Operário Ferroviário	38	13	11	14	32	41	−9	50	
11	Ponte Preta	38	11	14	13	41	39	+2	47	
12	Vitória	38	11	12	15	42	48	−6	45	
13	Guarani	38	12	8	18	27	37	−10	44	
14	Brasil de Pelotas	38	11	11	16	31	47	−16	44	
15	Oeste	38	8	17	13	41	49	−8	41	
16	Figueirense	38	7	20	11	31	38	−7	41	
17	Londrina (R)	38	11	6	21	37	53	−16	39	Relegation to Campeonato Brasileiro Série C
18	São Bento (R)	38	10	9	19	46	54	−8	39	Relegation to Campeonato Brasileiro Série C
19	Criciúma (R)	38	8	15	15	30	38	−8	39	Relegation to Campeonato Brasileiro Série C
20	Vila Nova (R)	38	7	18	13	27	40	−13	39	Relegation to Campeonato Brasileiro Série C

Source: CBF
Rules for classification: 1) points; 2) wins; 3) goal difference; 4) goals scored; 5) head-to-head results (only between 2 teams. Away goals rule is used); 6) fewest red cards; 7) fewest yellow cards; 8) draw.
(C) Champions; (P) Promoted; (R) Relegated

Bragantino won the league.

=== Promotion ===
The four best placed teams, Bragantino, Sport, Coritiba and Atlético Goianiense, were promoted to the following year's first level.

=== Relegation ===
The four worst placed teams, Londrina, São Bento, Criciúma and Vila Nova, were relegated to the following year's third level.

== Campeonato Brasileiro Série C ==
The 2019 Campeonato Brasileiro Série C started on April 27, 2019, and ended on October 6, 2019.

- ABC
- Atlético Acreano
- Boa Esporte
- Botafogo (PB)
- Confiança
- Ferroviário
- Globo
- Imperatriz
- Juventude
- Luverdense
- Náutico
- Paysandu
- Remo
- Sampaio Corrêa
- Santa Cruz
- São José (RS)
- Tombense
- Treze
- Volta Redonda
- Ypiranga

The Campeonato Brasileiro Série C final was played between Náutico and Sampaio Corrêa.

September 29, 2019

Náutico	3–1	Sampaio Corrêa

Estádio dos Aflitos, Recife

October 6, 2019

Sampaio Corrêa	2–2	Náutico

Castelão, São Luís

Náutico won the league after beating Sampaio Corrêa

=== Promotion ===
The four best placed teams, Náutico, Sampaio Corrêa, Juventude and Confiança, were promoted to the following year's second level.

=== Relegation ===
The four worst placed teams, ABC, Globo, Luverdense and Atlético Acreano, were relegated to the following year's fourth level.

== Campeonato Brasileiro Série D ==
The 2019 Campeonato Brasileiro Série D started on May 4, 2019, and ended on August 18, 2019.

- Altos
- América de Natal
- América (PE)
- Anapolina
- Aparecidense
- ASA
- Atlético Cearense
- Atlético Roraima
- Avenida
- Bahia de Feira
- Barcelona
- Boavista
- Bragantino (PA)
- Brasiliense
- Brusque
- Caldense
- Campinense
- Caxias
- Central
- Cianorte
- Corumbaense
- Coruripe
- Fast Clube
- Ferroviária
- Floresta
- Fluminense de Feira
- Foz do Iguaçu
- Galvez
- Gaúcho
- Hercílio Luz
- Interporto
- Iporá
- Itabaiana
- Itaboraí
- Ituano
- Jacuipense
- Joinville
- Juazeirense
- Manaus
- Maranhão
- Maringá
- Moto Club
- Novorizontino
- Operário
- Palmas
- Patrocinense
- Portuguesa (RJ)
- Real Ariquemes
- Rio Branco (AC)
- River
- Salgueiro
- Santa Cruz de Natal
- Santos (AP)
- São Caetano
- São Raimundo (PA)
- São Raimundo (RR)
- Sergipe
- Serra
- Serrano
- Sinop
- Sobradinho
- Tubarão
- Tupi
- União Rondonópolis
- URT
- Vitória das Tabocas
- Vitória (ES)
- Ypiranga (AP)

Gurupi declined to participate in the Série D. They were replaced by Interporto.

The Campeonato Brasileiro Série D final was played between Brusque and Manaus.

August 11, 2019

Brusque	2–2	Manaus

Estádio Augusto Bauer, Brusque

August 18, 2019

Manaus	2–2	Brusque
Penalties
	5–6

Arena da Amazônia, Manaus

Brusque won the league after defeating Manaus.

=== Promotion ===
The four best placed teams, Brusque, Manaus, Ituano and Jacuipense, were promoted to the following year's third level.

== Domestic cups ==
=== Copa do Brasil ===
The 2019 Copa do Brasil started on February 5, 2019, and ended on September 18, 2019. The Copa do Brasil final was played between Athletico Paranaense and Internacional.

September 11, 2019

Athletico Paranaense	1–0	Internacional

Arena da Baixada, Curitiba

September 18, 2019

Internacional	1–2	Athletico Paranaense

Estádio Beira-Rio, Porto Alegre

Athletico Paranaense won the cup after defeating Internacional.

=== Copa do Nordeste ===
The competition features 16 clubs from the Northeastern region. It started on January 15, 2019, and ended on May 29, 2019. The Copa do Nordeste final was played between Fortaleza and Botafogo (PB).

May 23, 2019

Fortaleza	1–0	Botafogo (PB)

Castelão, Fortaleza

May 29, 2019

Botafogo (PB)	0–1	Fortaleza

Almeidão, João Pessoa

Fortaleza won the cup after defeating Botafogo (PB).

=== Copa Verde ===
The competition featured 24 clubs from the North and Central-West regions, including two teams from Espírito Santo. It started on July 24, 2019, and ended on November 20, 2019. The Copa Verde final was played between Cuiabá and Paysandu.

November 14, 2019

Cuiabá	0–1	Paysandu

Arena Pantanal, Cuiabá

November 20, 2019

Paysandu	0–1	Cuiabá
Penalties
	4–5

Estádio Olímpico do Pará, Belém

Cuiabá won the cup after defeating Paysandu.

== State championship champions ==
State	Champions
(Acre (state)) Acre	Atlético Acreano
Alagoas	CSA
Amapá	Santos
(Amazonas (Brazilian state)) Amazonas	Manaus
Bahia	Bahia
Ceará	Fortaleza
(Federal District (Brazil)) Distrito Federal	Gama
Espírito Santo	Vitória
Goiás	Atlético Goianiense
Maranhão	Imperatriz
Mato Grosso	Cuiabá
Mato Grosso do Sul	Águia Negra
Minas Gerais	Cruzeiro
Pará	Remo
Paraíba	Botafogo
(Paraná (state)) Paraná	Athletico Paranaense
Pernambuco	Sport
Piauí	River
(Rio de Janeiro (state)) Rio de Janeiro	Flamengo
Rio Grande do Norte	América de Natal
Rio Grande do Sul	Grêmio
Rondônia	Vilhenense
Roraima	São Raimundo
(Santa Catarina (state)) Santa Catarina	Avaí
(São Paulo (state)) São Paulo	Corinthians
Sergipe	Frei Paulistano
Tocantins	Palmas

== State cup competition champions ==
Competition	Champions
Copa Espírito Santo	Real Noroeste
Copa Fares Lopes	Caucaia
Copa FGF	Pelotas
Copa FMF (MA)	Juventude
Copa FMF (MT)	Luverdense
Copa Paulista	São Caetano
Copa Pernambuco	Santa Cruz
Copa Rio	Bonsucesso
Copa Santa Catarina	Brusque
Taça FPF	Nacional

== Youth competition champions ==
Competition	Champions
Campeonato Brasileiro de Aspirantes	Internacional
Campeonato Brasileiro Sub-20	Flamengo
Copa do Brasil Sub-20	Palmeiras
Supercopa do Brasil Sub-20	Flamengo
Campeonato Brasileiro Sub-17	Flamengo
Copa do Brasil Sub-17^{(1)}	Palmeiras
Supercopa do Brasil Sub-17	Palmeiras
Copa RS de Futebol Sub-20	Grêmio
Copa Santiago de Futebol Juvenil	Grêmio
Copa São Paulo de Futebol Júnior	São Paulo
Copa 2 de Julho Sub-15	Palmeiras

^{(1)} The Copa Nacional do Espírito Santo Sub-17, between 2008 and 2012, was named Copa Brasil Sub-17. The similar named Copa do Brasil Sub-17 is organized by the Brazilian Football Confederation and it was first played in 2013.

== Brazilian clubs in international competitions ==
Team	2019 Copa Libertadores	2019 Copa Sudamericana	2019 Recopa Sudamericana	2019 J.League Cup / Copa Sudamericana Championship	2019 FIFA Club World Cup
Athletico Paranaense	Round of 16 eliminated by (Argentina) Boca Juniors	N/A	Runners-up lost to (Argentina) River Plate	Champions defeated (Japan) Shonan Bellmare	N/A
Atlético Mineiro	Eliminated in the Group Stage	Semi-finals eliminated by (Argentina) Colón	N/A	N/A	N/A
Bahia	N/A	First Stage eliminated by (Uruguay) Liverpool	N/A	N/A	N/A
Botafogo	N/A	Round of 16 eliminated by (Brazil) Atlético Mineiro	N/A	N/A	N/A
Chapecoense	N/A	First Stage eliminated by (Chile) Unión La Calera	N/A	N/A	N/A
Corinthians	N/A	Semi-finals eliminated by (Ecuador) Independiente del Valle	N/A	N/A	N/A
Cruzeiro	Round of 16 eliminated by (Argentina) River Plate	N/A	N/A	N/A	N/A
Flamengo	Champions defeated (Argentina) River Plate	N/A	N/A	N/A	Runners-up lost to (England) Liverpool
Fluminense	N/A	Quarter-finals eliminated by (Brazil) Corinthians	N/A	N/A	N/A
Grêmio	Semi-finals eliminated by (Brazil) Flamengo	N/A	N/A	N/A	N/A
Internacional	Quarter-finals eliminated by (Brazil) Flamengo	N/A	N/A	N/A	N/A
Palmeiras	Quarter-finals eliminated by (Brazil) Grêmio	N/A	N/A	N/A	N/A
Santos	N/A	First Stage eliminated by (Uruguay) River Plate	N/A	N/A	N/A
São Paulo	Second Stage eliminated by (Argentina) Talleres	N/A	N/A	N/A	N/A

== Brazil national team ==
The following table lists all the games played by the Brazilian national team in official competitions and friendly matches during 2019.

=== Friendlies ===
March 23	Brazil	1–1	Panama	Porto, Portugal
14:00 UTC−3	Lucas Paquetá 32'	Report	Machado 36'	Stadium: Estádio do Dragão; Attendance: 39,410; Referee: João Pinheiro (Portugal)

March 26	Czech Republic	1–3	Brazil	Prague, Czech Republic
16:45 UTC−3	Pavelka 37'	Report	Roberto Firmino 49'; Gabriel Jesus 83', 90'	Stadium: Sinobo Stadium; Attendance: 19,166; Referee: Ovidiu Hațegan (Romania)

June 5	Brazil	2–0	Qatar	Brasília, Brazil
21:30 UTC−3	Richarlison 16'; Gabriel Jesus 24'	Report		Stadium: Mané Garrincha; Attendance: 34,204; Referee: José Argote (Venezuela)

June 9	Brazil	7–0	Honduras	Porto Alegre, Brazil
16:00 UTC−3	Gabriel Jesus 6', 47'; Thiago Silva 13'; Philippe Coutinho 37' (pen.); David Neres 56'; Roberto Firmino 65'; Richarlison 70'	Report		Stadium: Estádio Beira-Rio; Attendance: 16,521; Referee: Andrés Cunha (Uruguay)

September 6	Brazil	2–2	Colombia	Miami Gardens, United States
21:30 UTC−3	Casemiro 20'; Neymar 58'	Report	Muriel 25' (pen.), 34'	Stadium: Hard Rock Stadium; Attendance: 65,232; Referee: Ismail Elfath (United States)

September 11	Brazil	0–1	Peru	Los Angeles, United States
00:00 UTC−3		Report	Abram 84'	Stadium: Los Angeles Memorial Coliseum; Attendance: 32,287; Referee: Jair Marrufo (United States)

October 10	Brazil	1–1	Senegal	Kallang, Singapore
09:00 UTC−3	Roberto Firmino 8'	Report	Diédhiou 45' (pen.)	Stadium: National Stadium; Attendance: 20,621; Referee: Muhammad Taqi (Singapore)

October 13	Brazil	1–1	Nigeria	Kallang, Singapore
09:00 UTC−3	Casemiro 48'	Report	Aribo 35'	Stadium: National Stadium; Attendance: 20,305; Referee: Chuan Hui Jansen Foo (Singapore)

November 15	Brazil	0–1	Argentina	Riyadh, Saudi Arabia
14:00 UTC−3		Report	Messi 13'	Stadium: King Saud University Stadium; Attendance: 22,541; Referee: Matthew Conger (New Zealand)

November 19	Brazil	3–0	South Korea	Abu Dhabi, United Arab Emirates
10:30 UTC−3	Lucas Paquetá 8'; Philippe Coutinho 35'; Danilo 59'	Report		Stadium: Mohammed bin Zayed Stadium; Referee: Ammar Al-Jeneibi (United Arab Emirates)

=== Copa América ===
June 14 Group A	Brazil	3–0	Bolivia	São Paulo, Brazil
21:30 (UTC-3)	Philippe Coutinho 49' (pen.), 52'; Everton 84'	Report		Stadium: Estádio do Morumbi; Attendance: 47,260; Referee: Néstor Pitana (Argentina)

June 18 Group A	Brazil	0–0	Venezuela	Salvador, Brazil
21:30 (UTC-3)		Report		Stadium: Arena Fonte Nova; Attendance: 42,587; Referee: Julio Bascuñán (Chile)

June 22 Group A	Peru	0–5	Brazil	São Paulo, Brazil
16:00 (UTC-3)		Report	Casemiro 11'; Roberto Firmino 18'; Everton 31'; Dani Alves 53'; Willian 90'	Stadium: Arena Corinthians; Attendance: 45,067; Referee: Fernando Rapallini (Argentina)

June 27 Quarter-finals	Brazil	0–0 (4–3 p)	Paraguay	Porto Alegre, Brazil
21:30 (UTC-3)		Report		Stadium: Arena do Grêmio; Attendance: 48,211; Referee: Roberto Tobar (Chile)
	Penalties
	Willian (penalty scored); Marquinhos (penalty scored); Philippe Coutinho (penalty scored); Roberto Firmino (penalty missed); Gabriel Jesus (penalty scored)		(penalty missed) Gómez; (penalty scored) Almirón; (penalty scored) Valdez; (penalty scored) R. Rojas; (penalty missed) González

July 2 Semi-finals	Brazil	2–0	Argentina	Belo Horizonte, Brazil
21:30 (UTC-3)	Gabriel Jesus 18'; Roberto Firmino 70'	Report		Stadium: Mineirão; Attendance: 55,947; Referee: Roddy Zambrano (Ecuador)

July 7 Final	Brazil	3–1	Peru	Rio de Janeiro, Brazil
17:00 (UTC-3)	Everton 14'; Gabriel Jesus 45+2'; Richarlison 89' (pen.)	Report	Guerrero 43' (pen.)	Stadium: Maracanã; Attendance: 69,906; Referee: Roberto Tobar (Chile)

== Women's football ==
=== Campeonato Brasileiro de Futebol Feminino Série A1 ===
The 2019 Campeonato Brasileiro de Futebol Feminino Série A1 started on March 16, 2019, and ended on September 29, 2019.

- Audax
- Corinthians
- Ferroviária
- Flamengo/Marinha
- Foz Cataratas/Athletico Paranaense
- Internacional
- Iranduba
- Kindermann/Avaí
- Minas/ICESP
- Ponte Preta
- Santos
- São Francisco
- São José
- Sport/Ipojuca
- Vitória
- Vitória das Tabocas/Santa Cruz

Rio Preto women's section was closed. They were replaced by Internacional

The Campeonato Brasileiro de Futebol Feminino Série A1 final was played between Ferroviária and Corinthians.

September 22, 2019

Ferroviária	1–1	Corinthians

Estádio Fonte Luminosa, Araraquara

September 29, 2019

Corinthians	0–0	Ferroviária
Penalties
	2–4

Estádio Parque São Jorge, São Paulo

Ferroviária won the league after defeating Corinthians.

==== Relegation ====
The four worst placed teams, Vitória das Tabocas/Santa Cruz, Foz Cataratas/Athletico Paranaense, São Francisco and Sport/Ipojuca, were relegated to the following year's second level.

=== Campeonato Brasileiro de Futebol Feminino Série A2 ===
The 2019 Campeonato Brasileiro de Futebol Feminino Série A2 started on March 27, 2019, and ended on August 25, 2019.

- 3B da Amazônia
- Aliança
- América Mineiro
- Atlético Acreano
- Atlético Mineiro
- Botafogo
- Botafogo (PB)
- Canindé
- Ceará
- Chapecoense
- CRESSPOM
- Cruzeiro
- Cruzeiro (RN)
- Duque de Caxias
- ESMAC
- Fluminense
- Grêmio
- Lusaca/Bahia
- Moreninhas
- Náutico
- Operário Ltda.
- Oratório
- Palmeiras
- Pinheirense
- Porto Velho
- Portuguesa (SP)
- Santa Quitéria
- São Paulo
- São Raimundo (RR)
- São Valério
- Taubaté
- Tiradentes
- Toledo/Ouro Verde
- UDA/CSA
- Vasco da Gama
- Vila Nova (ES)

Internacional was promoted to Série A1. They were replaced by Vasco da Gama

The Campeonato Brasileiro de Futebol Feminino Série A2 final was played between São Paulo and Cruzeiro.

August 18, 2019

São Paulo	4–0	Cruzeiro

Pacaembu, São Paulo

August 25, 2019

Cruzeiro	1–1	São Paulo

Estádio das Alterosas, Belo Horizonte

São Paulo won the league after defeating Cruzeiro.

==== Promotion ====
The four best placed teams, São Paulo, Cruzeiro, Palmeiras and Grêmio, were promoted to the following year's first level.

=== Domestic competition champions ===
State	Champions
(Acre (state)) Acre	Atlético Acreano
Alagoas	UDA
Amapá	Oratório
(Amazonas (Brazilian state)) Amazonas	3B da Amazônia
Bahia	Bahia
Ceará	Ceará
(Federal District (Brazil)) Distrito Federal	Real
Espírito Santo	Vila Nova
Goiás	Goiás/UNIVERSO
Maranhão	Juventude Timonense
Mato Grosso	Operário
Mato Grosso do Sul	SERC/UCDB
Minas Gerais	Cruzeiro
Pará	ESMAC
Paraíba	Auto Esporte
(Paraná (state)) Paraná	Foz Cataratas/Athletico Paranaense
Pernambuco	Vitória das Tabocas/Santa Cruz
Piauí	Tiradentes
(Rio de Janeiro (state)) Rio de Janeiro	Flamengo/Marinha
Rio Grande do Norte	Cruzeiro
Rio Grande do Sul	Internacional
Rondônia	Real Ariquemes
Roraima	São Raimundo
(Santa Catarina (state)) Santa Catarina	Kindermann/Avaí
(São Paulo (state)) São Paulo	Corinthians
Sergipe	Santos Dumont
Tocantins	São Valério

=== State cup competition champions ===
Competition	Champions
Copa Paulista de Futebol Feminino	Palmeiras

=== Youth competition champions ===
Competition	Champions
Campeonato Brasileiro de Futebol Feminino Sub-18	Internacional
Campeonato Brasileiro de Futebol Feminino Sub-16	São Paulo

=== Brazilian clubs in international competitions ===
Team	2019 Copa Libertadores Femenina
Corinthians	Champions defeated (Brazil) Ferroviária
Ferroviária	Runners-up lost to (Brazil) Corinthians

=== National team ===
The following table lists all the games played by the Brazil women's national football team in official competitions and friendly matches during 2019.

The Brazil women's national football team competed in the following competitions in 2019:

==== Friendlies ====
April 5	Spain	2–1	Brazil	Don Benito, Spain
18:30 (CEST)	Putellas 62'; Torrecilla 68'	Report	Marta 32'	Stadium: Estadio Vicente Sanz; Attendance: 4,800; Referee: Zulema González González (Spain)

April 8	Scotland	1–0	Brazil	San Pedro del Pinatar, Spain
20:00 (CEST)	Little 38'	Report		Stadium: Pinatar Arena; Attendance: 1,000; Referee: Petra Pavlíková (Slovakia)

October 5	England	1–2	Brazil	Middlesbrough, England
12:45 (BST)	England 80'	Report	Debinha 49', 67'	Stadium: Riverside Stadium; Attendance: 29,238; Referee: Riem Hussein (Germany)

October 8	Poland	1–3	Brazil	Kielce, Poland
20:15 (CEST)	Mesjasz 58'	Report	Formiga 9'; Tamires 49'; Debinha 79'	Stadium: Suzuki Arena; Attendance: 3,585; Referee: Olga Zadinová (Czech Republic)

December 12	Brazil	6–0	Mexico	São Paulo, Brazil
21:00 (BRT)	Duda 9'; Debinha 40'; Bia Zaneratto 70', 82', 90'; Millene 87'	Report		Stadium: Arena Corinthians; Attendance: 4,993; Referee: Thayslane de Melo Costa (Brazil)

December 15	Brazil	4–0	Mexico	Araraquara, Brazil
18:30 (BRT)	Cristiane 9', 38'; Debinha 26'; Victória 74'	Report		Stadium: Estádio Fonte Luminosa; Attendance: 5,384; Referee: Rejane Caetano da Silva (Brazil)

==== 2019 SheBelieves Cup ====
February 27	England	2–1	Brazil	Chester, United States
16:00 (ET)	White 49'; Mead 75'	Report	Andressa Alves 16' (pen.)	Stadium: Talen Energy Stadium; Attendance: 5,954; Referee: Katja Koroleva (United States)

March 2	Brazil	1–3	Japan	Nashville, United States
13:00 (CT)	Debinha 57'	Report	Momiki 44'; Kobayashi 81'; Hasegawa 85'	Stadium: Nissan Stadium; Attendance: 12,586; Referee: Karen Abt (United States)

March 5	United States	1–0	Brazil	Tampa, United States
20:20 (ET)	Heath 20'	Report		Stadium: Raymond James Stadium; Attendance: 14,009; Referee: Carol Anne Chénard (Canada)

==== 2019 FIFA Women's World Cup ====
June 9 Group C	Brazil	3–0	Jamaica	Grenoble, France
15:30 (CEST)	Cristiane 15', 50', 64'	Report		Stadium: Stade des Alpes; Attendance: 17,668; Referee: Riem Hussein (Germany)

June 13 Group C	Australia	3–2	Brazil	Montpellier, France
18:00 (CEST)	Foord 45+1'; Logarzo 58'; Mônica 66' (o.g.)	Report	Marta 27' (pen.); Cristiane 38'	Stadium: Stade de la Mosson; Attendance: 17,032; Referee: Esther Staubli (Switzerland)

June 18 Group C	Italy	0–1	Brazil	Valenciennes, France
21:00 (CEST)		Report	Marta 74' (pen.)	Stadium: Stade du Hainaut; Attendance: 21,669; Referee: Lucila Venegas (Mexico)

June 23 Round of 16	France	2–1 (a.e.t.)	Brazil	Le Havre, France
21:00 (CEST)	Gauvin 52'; Henry 107'	Report	Thaisa 63'	Stadium: Stade Océane; Attendance: 23,965; Referee: Marie-Soleil Beaudoin (Canada)

==== 2019 Torneio Uber Internacional de Futebol Feminino ====
August 29 Semifinal	Brazil	5–0	Argentina	São Paulo, Brazil
21:30 (BRT)	Ludmila 18'; Formiga 34'; Debinha 36'; Érika 59'; Juncos 83' (o.g.)	Report		Stadium: Pacaembu; Attendance: 13,180; Referee: Edina Alves Batista (Brazil)

September 1 Final	Brazil	0–0 (4–5 p)	Chile	São Paulo, Brazil
13:00 (BRT)		Report		Stadium: Pacaembu; Attendance: 16,812; Referee: Deborah Cecília Cruz Correia (Brazil)
	Penalties
	Raquel (penalty missed); Mônica (penalty scored); Chú (penalty scored); Bia Zaneratto (penalty scored); Luana (penalty missed); Bruna Benites (penalty missed); Fabiana (penalty scored); Joyce (penalty missed)		(penalty scored) Lara; (penalty scored) Balmaceda; (penalty scored) Hidalgo; (penalty missed) Pardo; (penalty missed) Endler; (penalty missed) Roa; (penalty scored) Aedo; (penalty scored) Toro

==== 2019 Yongchuan International Tournament ====
November 7 Semifinal	Brazil	4–0	Canada	Chongqing, China
16:00 (CST)	Chú 12'; Formiga 23'; Bia Zaneratto 41', 57'	Report		Stadium: Yongchuan Sports Center; Attendance: 4,823; Referee: Cha Min-ji (South Korea)

November 10 Final	Brazil	0–0 (2–4 p)	China	Chongqing, China
19:35 (CST)		Report		Stadium: Yongchuan Sports Center; Attendance: 20,367; Referee: Cha Min-ji (South Korea)
	Penalties
	Tamires (penalty missed); Aline Milene (penalty scored); Raquel (penalty scored); Andressinha (penalty missed)		(penalty scored) Wang Shuang; (penalty scored) Tang Jiali; (penalty scored) Liu Shanshan; (penalty scored) Wu Haiyan

Competition	Performance
SheBelieves Cup	Fourth place
FIFA Women's World Cup	Round of 16 eliminated by France
Torneio Internacional de Futebol Feminino	Runners-up lost to Chile
Yongchuan International Tournament	Runners-up lost to China
