= 2020 in Brazilian football =

Overview of football in Brazil during the 2020 season

Football in Brazil
- Season: 2020

Men's football
- Série A: Flamengo
- Série B: Chapecoense
- Série C: Vila Nova
- Série D: Mirassol
- Copa do Brasil: Palmeiras
- Supercopa: Flamengo

Women's football
- Série A1: Corinthians
- Série A2: Napoli

The following article presents a summary of the 2020 football (soccer) season in Brazil, which is the 119th season of competitive football in the country.

== Campeonato Brasileiro Série A ==
The 2020 Campeonato Brasileiro Série A started on August 8, 2020, and ended on February 25, 2021.

- Athletico Paranaense
- Atlético Goianiense
- Atlético Mineiro
- Bahia
- Botafogo
- Ceará
- Corinthians
- Coritiba
- Flamengo
- Fluminense
- Fortaleza
- Goiás
- Grêmio
- Internacional
- Palmeiras
- Red Bull Bragantino
- Santos
- São Paulo
- Sport
- Vasco da Gama

Pos	Team	Pld	W	D	L	GF	GA	GD	Pts	Qualification or relegation
1	Flamengo (C)	38	21	8	9	68	48	+20	71	Qualification for Copa Libertadores group stage
2	Internacional	38	20	10	8	61	35	+26	70	Qualification for Copa Libertadores group stage
3	Atlético Mineiro	38	20	8	10	64	45	+19	68	Qualification for Copa Libertadores group stage
4	São Paulo	38	18	12	8	59	41	+18	66	Qualification for Copa Libertadores group stage
5	Fluminense	38	18	10	10	55	42	+13	64	Qualification for Copa Libertadores group stage
6	Grêmio	38	14	17	7	53	40	+13	59	Qualification for Copa Libertadores second stage
7	Palmeiras	38	15	13	10	51	37	+14	58	Qualification for Copa Libertadores group stage (Note: Palmeiras qualified for the Copa Libertadores group stage by winning the 2020 Copa Libertadores and the 2020 Copa do Brasil.)
8	Santos	38	14	12	12	52	51	+1	54	Qualification for Copa Libertadores second stage
9	Athletico Paranaense	38	15	8	15	38	36	+2	53	Qualification for Copa Sudamericana group stage
10	Red Bull Bragantino	38	13	14	11	50	40	+10	53	Qualification for Copa Sudamericana group stage
11	Ceará	38	14	10	14	54	51	+3	52	Qualification for Copa Sudamericana group stage
12	Corinthians	38	13	12	13	45	45	0	51	Qualification for Copa Sudamericana group stage
13	Atlético Goianiense	38	12	14	12	40	45	−5	50	Qualification for Copa Sudamericana group stage
14	Bahia	38	12	8	18	48	59	−11	44	Qualification for Copa Sudamericana group stage
15	Sport	38	12	6	20	31	50	−19	42	
16	Fortaleza	38	10	11	17	34	44	−10	41	
17	Vasco da Gama (R)	38	10	11	17	37	56	−19	41	Relegation to Campeonato Brasileiro Série B
18	Goiás (R)	38	9	10	19	41	63	−22	37	Relegation to Campeonato Brasileiro Série B
19	Coritiba (R)	38	7	10	21	31	54	−23	31	Relegation to Campeonato Brasileiro Série B
20	Botafogo (R)	38	5	12	21	32	62	−30	27	Relegation to Campeonato Brasileiro Série B

Source: CBF
Rules for classification: 1) points; 2) wins; 3) goal difference; 4) goals scored; 5) head-to-head results (only between 2 teams); 6) fewest red cards; 7) fewest yellow cards; 8) draw.
(C) Champions; (R) Relegated
Notes:

Flamengo won the league.

=== Relegation ===
The four worst placed teams, Vasco da Gama, Goiás, Coritiba and Botafogo, were relegated to the following year's second level.

== Campeonato Brasileiro Série B ==
The 2020 Campeonato Brasileiro Série B started on August 7, 2020, and ended on January 29, 2021.

- América Mineiro
- Avaí
- Botafogo (SP)
- Brasil de Pelotas
- Chapecoense
- Confiança
- CRB
- Cruzeiro
- CSA
- Cuiabá
- Figueirense
- Guarani
- Juventude
- Náutico
- Oeste
- Operário Ferroviário
- Paraná
- Ponte Preta
- Sampaio Corrêa
- Vitória

Pos	Team	Pld	W	D	L	GF	GA	GD	Pts	Promotion or relegation
1	Chapecoense (C, P)	38	20	13	5	42	21	+21	73	Promotion to 2021 Campeonato Brasileiro Série A
2	América Mineiro (P)	38	20	13	5	43	23	+20	73	Promotion to 2021 Campeonato Brasileiro Série A
3	Juventude (P)	38	17	10	11	52	42	+10	61	Promotion to 2021 Campeonato Brasileiro Série A
4	Cuiabá (P)	38	17	10	11	48	40	+8	61	Promotion to 2021 Campeonato Brasileiro Série A
5	CSA	38	16	10	12	50	37	+13	58	
6	Sampaio Corrêa	38	17	6	15	50	38	+12	57	
7	Ponte Preta	38	16	9	13	54	49	+5	57	
8	Operário Ferroviário	38	15	12	11	40	34	+6	57	
9	Avaí	38	16	7	15	45	49	−4	55	
10	CRB	38	15	7	16	48	47	+1	52	
11	Cruzeiro (Note: Cruzeiro were deducted six points after their denial to pay the fee that was agreed upon with Al Wahda over the loan of Denílson in 2016. Al Wahda decided to take this issue to FIFA and won the case.)	38	14	13	11	39	32	+7	49	
12	Brasil de Pelotas	38	11	16	11	31	33	−2	49	
13	Guarani	38	13	9	16	41	48	−7	48	
14	Vitória	38	11	15	12	45	45	0	48	
15	Confiança	38	12	10	16	38	46	−8	46	
16	Náutico	38	10	14	14	35	42	−7	44	
17	Figueirense (R)	38	9	12	17	35	49	−14	39	Relegation to 2021 Campeonato Brasileiro Série C
18	Paraná (R)	38	9	10	19	34	50	−16	37	Relegation to 2021 Campeonato Brasileiro Série C
19	Botafogo-SP (R)	38	8	10	20	26	39	−13	34	Relegation to 2021 Campeonato Brasileiro Série C
20	Oeste (R)	38	7	8	23	28	60	−32	29	Relegation to 2021 Campeonato Brasileiro Série C

Source: CBF
Rules for classification: 1) points; 2) wins; 3) goal difference; 4) goals scored; 5) head-to-head results (only between 2 teams); 6) fewest red cards; 7) fewest yellow cards; 8) draw.
(C) Champions; (P) Promoted; (R) Relegated
Notes:

Chapecoense won the league.

=== Promotion ===
The four best placed teams, Chapecoense, América Mineiro, Juventude and Cuiabá, were promoted to the following year's first level.

=== Relegation ===
The four worst placed teams, Figueirense, Paraná, Botafogo-SP and Oeste, were relegated to the following year's third level.

== Campeonato Brasileiro Série C ==
The 2020 Campeonato Brasileiro Série C started on August 8, 2020, and ended on January 30, 2021.

- Boa Esporte
- Botafogo (PB)
- Brusque
- Criciúma
- Ferroviário
- Imperatriz
- Ituano
- Jacuipense
- Londrina
- Manaus
- Paysandu
- Remo
- Santa Cruz
- São Bento
- São José (RS)
- Tombense
- Treze
- Vila Nova
- Volta Redonda
- Ypiranga

The Campeonato Brasileiro Série C final was played between Vila Nova and Remo.

January 23, 2021

Vila Nova	5–1	Remo

Estádio Onésio Brasileiro Alvarenga, Goiânia

January 30, 2021

Remo	2–3	Vila Nova

Estádio Olímpico do Pará, Belém

Vila Nova won the league after beating Remo.

=== Promotion ===
The four best placed teams, Vila Nova, Remo, Londrina and Brusque, were promoted to the following year's second level.

=== Relegation ===
The four worst placed teams, Treze, São Bento, Boa Esporte and Imperatriz, were relegated to the following year's fourth level.

== Campeonato Brasileiro Série D ==
The 2020 Campeonato Brasileiro Série D started on September 6, 2020, and ended on February 6, 2021.

- ABC
- Afogados
- Águia Negra
- Altos
- América de Natal
- Aparecidense
- Aquidauanense
- Atlético Acreano
- Atlético Cajazeirense
- Atlético de Alagoinhas
- Bahia de Feira
- Bangu
- Baré
- Bragantino (PA)
- Brasiliense
- Cabofriense
- Caldense
- Campinense
- FC Cascavel
- Caxias
- Central
- CEOV
- Coruripe
- Fast Clube
- Ferroviária
- Floresta
- Freipaulistano
- Galvez
- Gama
- Globo
- Goianésia
- Goiânia
- Guarany de Sobral
- Independente
- Itabaiana
- Jaciobá
- Ji-Paraná
- Joinville
- Juventude Samas
- Marcílio Dias
- Mirassol
- Moto Club
- Nacional (AM)
- Nacional (PR)
- Novorizontino
- Palmas
- Pelotas
- Portuguesa (RJ)
- Potiguar de Mossoró
- Real Noroeste
- Rio Branco
- River
- Salgueiro
- Santos (AP)
- São Caetano
- São Luiz
- São Raimundo (RR)
- Sinop
- Tocantinópolis
- Toledo
- Tubarão
- Tupynambás
- União Rondonópolis
- Vilhenense
- Villa Nova
- Vitória (ES)
- Vitória da Conquista
- Ypiranga (AP)

CRAC, Luverdense, Patrocinense, and Red Bull Brasil declined to participate in the Série D. They were replaced by Aparecidense, Sinop, Villa Nova, and Mirassol, respectively.

The Campeonato Brasileiro Série D final was played between Mirassol and Floresta.

January 30, 2021

Floresta	0–1	Mirassol

Estádio Carlos de Alencar Pinto, Fortaleza

February 6, 2021

Mirassol	1–0	Floresta

Estádio José Maria de Campos Maia, Mirassol

Mirassol won the league after defeating Floresta.

=== Promotion ===
The four best placed teams, Mirassol, Floresta, Novorizontino and Altos, were promoted to the following year's third level.

== Super cup ==
=== Supercopa do Brasil ===
The 2020 Supercopa do Brasil was played on February 16, 2020 between Flamengo and Athletico Paranaense.

February 16, 2020

Flamengo	3–0	Athletico Paranaense

Estádio Nacional Mané Garrincha, Brasília

Flamengo won the super cup after defeating Athletico Paranaense.

== Domestic cups ==
=== Copa do Brasil ===
The 2020 Copa do Brasil started on February 5, 2020, and ended on March 7, 2021. The Copa do Brasil final was played between Palmeiras and Grêmio.

February 28, 2021

Grêmio	0–1	Palmeiras

Arena do Grêmio, Porto Alegre

March 7, 2021

Palmeiras	2–0	Grêmio

Allianz Parque, São Paulo

Palmeiras won the cup after defeating Grêmio.

=== Copa do Nordeste ===
The competition features 16 clubs from the Northeastern region. It started on January 21, 2020, and ended on August 4, 2020. The Copa do Nordeste final was played between Ceará and Bahia.

August 1, 2020

Ceará	3–1	Bahia

Estádio de Pituaçu, Salvador

August 4, 2020

Bahia	0–1	Ceará

Estádio de Pituaçu, Salvador

Ceará won the cup after defeating Bahia.

=== Copa Verde ===
The competition featured 24 clubs from the North and Central-West regions, including two teams from Espírito Santo. It started on 20 January 2021, and ended on 24 February 2021. The Copa Verde final was played between Brasiliense and Remo.

February 21, 2021

Brasiliense	2–1	Remo

Estádio Nacional Mané Garrincha, Brasília

February 24, 2021

Remo	2–1	Brasiliense
Penalties
	4–5

Estádio Olímpico do Pará, Belém

Brasiliense won the cup after defeating Remo.

== State championship champions ==
State	Champions
(Acre (state)) Acre	Galvez
Alagoas	CRB
Amapá	Ypiranga
(Amazonas (Brazilian state)) Amazonas	Penarol
Bahia	Bahia
Ceará	Fortaleza
(Federal District (Brazil)) Distrito Federal	Gama
Espírito Santo	Rio Branco de Venda Nova
Goiás	Atlético Goianiense
Maranhão	Sampaio Corrêa
Mato Grosso	Nova Mutum
Mato Grosso do Sul	Águia Negra
Minas Gerais	Atlético Mineiro
Pará	Paysandu
Paraíba	Treze
(Paraná (state)) Paraná	Athletico Paranaense
Pernambuco	Salgueiro
Piauí	4 de Julho
(Rio de Janeiro (state)) Rio de Janeiro	Flamengo
Rio Grande do Norte	ABC
Rio Grande do Sul	Grêmio
Rondônia	Porto Velho
Roraima	São Raimundo
(Santa Catarina (state)) Santa Catarina	Chapecoense
(São Paulo (state)) São Paulo	Palmeiras
Sergipe	Confiança
Tocantins	Palmas

== State cup competition champions ==
Competition	Champions
Copa Alagoas	ASA
Copa Fares Lopes	Ferroviário
Copa FGF	Santa Cruz
Copa Paulista	Portuguesa
Copa Rio Grande do Norte (Note: Tournament was the second stage of the 2020 Campeonato Potiguar)	ABC
Copa Santa Catarina	Joinville

== Youth competition champions ==
Competition	Champions
Campeonato Brasileiro de Aspirantes	Ceará
Campeonato Brasileiro Sub-20	Atlético Mineiro
Copa do Brasil Sub-20	Vasco da Gama
Supercopa do Brasil Sub-20	Vasco da Gama
Campeonato Brasileiro Sub-17	Fluminense
Copa do Brasil Sub-17^{(1)}	São Paulo
Supercopa do Brasil Sub-17	São Paulo
Copa RS de Futebol Sub-20	Cancelled
Copa Santiago de Futebol Juvenil	Palmeiras
Copa São Paulo de Futebol Júnior	Internacional

^{(1)} The Copa Nacional do Espírito Santo Sub-17, between 2008 and 2012, was named Copa Brasil Sub-17. The similarly named Copa do Brasil Sub-17 is organized by the Brazilian Football Confederation and it was first played in 2013.

== Brazilian clubs in international competitions ==
Team	2020 Copa Libertadores	2020 Copa Sudamericana	2020 Recopa Sudamericana	2020 FIFA Club World Cup
Athletico Paranaense	Round of 16 eliminated by (Argentina) River Plate	N/A	N/A	N/A
Atlético Mineiro	N/A	First Stage eliminated by (Argentina) Unión	N/A	N/A
Bahia	N/A	Quarter-finals eliminated by (Argentina) Defensa y Justicia	N/A	N/A
Corinthians	Second Stage eliminated by (Paraguay) Guaraní	N/A	N/A	N/A
Flamengo	Round of 16 eliminated by (Argentina) Racing	N/A	Champions defeated (Ecuador) Independiente del Valle	N/A
Fluminense	N/A	First Stage eliminated by (Chile) Unión La Calera	N/A	N/A
Fortaleza	N/A	First Stage eliminated by (Argentina) Independiente	N/A	N/A
Goiás	N/A	First Stage eliminated by (Paraguay) Sol de América	N/A	N/A
Grêmio	Quarter-finals eliminated by (Brazil) Santos	N/A	N/A	N/A
Internacional	Round of 16 eliminated by (Argentina) Boca Juniors	N/A	N/A	N/A
Palmeiras	Champions defeated (Brazil) Santos	N/A	N/A	Semi-finals eliminated by (Mexico) UANL
Santos	Runners-up lost to (Brazil) Palmeiras	N/A	N/A	N/A
São Paulo	Eliminated in the group stage	Second Stage eliminated by (Argentina) Lanús	N/A	N/A
Vasco da Gama	N/A	Round of 16 eliminated by (Argentina) Defensa y Justicia	N/A	N/A

== Brazil national team ==
The following table lists all the games played by the Brazilian national team in official competitions and friendly matches during 2020.

=== FIFA World Cup qualification ===
October 9	Brazil	5–0	Bolivia	São Paulo, Brazil
21:30 UTC−3	Marquinhos 16'; Roberto Firmino 30', 49'; Carrasco 66' (o.g.); Philippe Coutinho 73'	Report		Stadium: Neo Química Arena; Attendance: 0 Referee: Leodán González (Uruguay)

October 13	Peru	2–4	Brazil	Lima, Peru
21:00 UTC−3	Carrillo 5'; Tapia 59'	Report	Neymar 28' (pen.), 83' (pen.), 90+4'; Richarlison 64'	Stadium: Estadio Nacional; Attendance: 0 Referee: Julio Bascuñán (Chile)

November 13	Brazil	1–0	Venezuela	São Paulo, Brazil
21:30 UTC−3	Roberto Firmino 66'	Report		Stadium: Estádio do Morumbi; Attendance: 0 Referee: Juan Gabriel Benítez (Paraguay)

November 17	Uruguay	0–2	Brazil	Montevideo, Uruguay
20:00 UTC−3		Report	Arthur 33'; Richarlison 45'	Stadium: Estadio Centenario; Attendance: 0 Referee: Roberto Tobar (Chile)

== Women's football ==
=== Campeonato Brasileiro de Futebol Feminino Série A1 ===
The 2020 Campeonato Brasileiro de Futebol Feminino Série A1 started on February 8, 2020, and ended on December 6, 2020.

- Audax
- Corinthians
- Cruzeiro
- Ferroviária
- Flamengo/Marinha
- Grêmio
- Internacional
- Iranduba
- Kindermann/Avaí
- Minas/ICESP
- Palmeiras
- Ponte Preta
- Santos
- São José
- São Paulo
- Vitória

After the tournament suspension due to the COVID-19 pandemic, Audax and Iranduba started a temporary partnership with Juventus and 3B da Amazônia, respectively.

The Campeonato Brasileiro de Futebol Feminino Série A1 final was played between Corinthians and Kindermann/Avaí.

November 22, 2020

Kindermann/Avaí	0–0	Corinthians

Estádio da Ressacada, Florianópolis

December 6, 2020

Corinthians	4–2	Kindermann/Avaí

Neo Química Arena, São Paulo

Corinthians won the league after defeating Kindermann/Avaí.

==== Relegation ====
The four worst placed teams, Iranduba, Audax, Ponte Preta and Vitória, were relegated to the following year's second level.

=== Campeonato Brasileiro de Futebol Feminino Série A2 ===
The 2020 Campeonato Brasileiro de Futebol Feminino Série A2 started on March 14, 2020, and ended on January 31, 2021.

- 3B da Amazônia
- América Mineiro
- Athletico Paranaense
- Atlético Acreano
- Atlético Goianiense
- Atlético Mineiro
- Auto Esporte
- Bahia
- Botafogo
- Brasil de Farroupilha
- Ceará
- Chapecoense
- Cruzeiro (RN)
- ESMAC
- Fluminense
- Fortaleza
- Foz Cataratas
- Goiás
- Juventude Timonense
- Juventus
- Napoli
- Náutico
- Operário FC
- Oratório
- Real Ariquemes
- Real Brasília
- Santos Dumont
- São Francisco
- São Valério
- SERC/UCDB
- Sport
- Tiradentes
- Toledo/Coritiba
- UDA
- Vasco da Gama
- Vila Nova (ES)

São Raimundo (RR) were excluded by CBF. They were replaced by Fortaleza.
Vitória das Tabocas/Santa Cruz declined to participate in the Série A2. They were replaced by Atlético Goianiense.

The Campeonato Brasileiro de Futebol Feminino Série A2 final was played between Napoli and Botafogo.

January 24, 2021

Napoli	2–1	Botafogo

Estádio Carlos Alberto da Costa Neves, Caçador

January 31, 2021

Botafogo	1–2	Napoli

Estádio Olímpico Nilton Santos, Rio de Janeiro

Napoli won the league after defeating Botafogo.

==== Promotion ====
The four best placed teams, Napoli, Botafogo, Bahia and Real Brasília, were promoted to the following year's first level.

=== Domestic competition champions ===
State	Champions
(Acre (state)) Acre	Cancelled
Alagoas	Cancelled
Amapá	Oratório
(Amazonas (Brazilian state)) Amazonas	JC
Bahia	Cancelled
Ceará	Fortaleza
(Federal District (Brazil)) Distrito Federal	Real Brasília
Espírito Santo	Cancelled
Goiás	Cancelled
Maranhão	Cefama
Mato Grosso	Mixto
Mato Grosso do Sul	SERC/UCDB
Minas Gerais	Atlético Mineiro
Pará	ESMAC
Paraíba	Botafogo
(Paraná (state)) Paraná	Athletico Paranaense
Pernambuco	Náutico
Piauí	Cancelled
(Rio de Janeiro (state)) Rio de Janeiro	Botafogo
Rio Grande do Norte	América de Natal
Rio Grande do Sul	Internacional
Rondônia	Real Ariquemes
Roraima	São Raimundo
(Santa Catarina (state)) Santa Catarina	Cancelled
(São Paulo (state)) São Paulo	Corinthians
Sergipe	Cancelled
Tocantins	Paraíso

=== State cup competition champions ===
Competition	Champions
Copa Paulista de Futebol Feminino	Santos

=== Youth competition champions ===
Competition	Champions
Campeonato Brasileiro de Futebol Feminino Sub-18	Fluminense
Campeonato Brasileiro de Futebol Feminino Sub-16	Internacional

=== Brazilian clubs in international competitions ===
Team	2020 Copa Libertadores Femenina
Corinthians	Third place defeated Universidad de Chile
Ferroviária	Champions defeated (Colombia) América
Kindermann/Avaí	Eliminated in the group stage

=== National team ===
The following table lists all the games played by the Brazil women's national football team in official competitions and friendly matches during 2020.

The Brazil women's national football team competed in the following competitions in 2020:

==== Friendlies ====
November 27	Brazil	6–0	Ecuador	São Paulo, Brazil
21:30 (BRT)	Debinha 33', 77', 84' (pen.); Valéria 78'; Rafaelle 82'; Duda Santos 87'	Report		Stadium: Neo Química Arena; Attendance: 0 Referee: Charly Wendy Straub Deretti (Brazil)

December 1	Brazil	8–0	Ecuador	São Paulo, Brazil
21:30 (BRT)	Debinha 1'; Luana 15'; Andressa Alves 17', 45+1'; Rafaelle 20', 41'; Julia Bianchi 70'; Érika 79'	Report		Stadium: Estádio do Morumbi; Attendance: 0 Referee: Edina Alves Batista (Brazil)

==== 2020 Tournoi de France ====
March 4	Netherlands	0–0	Brazil	Valenciennes, France
19:00 (CET)		Report		Stadium: Stade du Hainaut; Attendance: 6,199; Referee: Victoria Beyer (France)

March 7	France	1–0	Brazil	Valenciennes, France
21:00 (CET)	Gauvin 55'	Report		Stadium: Stade du Hainaut; Attendance: 17,022; Referee: Marta Huerta de Aza (Spain)

March 10	Brazil	2–2	Canada	Calais, France
19:00 (CET)	Marta 8'; Ludmila 18'	Report	Matheson 74'; Beckie 87'	Stadium: Stade de l'Épopée; Attendance: 0 ^{1} Referee: Stéphanie Frappart (France)

1. The match was played behind closed doors due to the COVID-19 pandemic in France.

Competition	Performance
Tournoi de France	Fourth place
