= Mário Jorge (football manager) =

Brazilian football manager (born 1978)

Personal information
- Full name: Mário Jorge dos Santos Silva
- Date of birth: 10 February 1978 (age 48)
- Place of birth: Rio de Janeiro, Brazil

Managerial career
- Years: Team
- 1997–2010: Helênico (futsal)
- 2011–2014: Audax Rio U15
- 2011–2012: Madureira (futsal)
- 2012–2018: Bradesco (futsal)
- 2015–2016: Vasco da Gama U15
- 2016–2017: Flamengo U13
- 2017–2018: Flamengo U14
- 2019: Flamengo U15
- 2020–2022: Flamengo U17
- 2022–2024: Flamengo U20
- 2023: Flamengo (interim)
- 2023: Flamengo (interim)
- 2024–2025: Saudi Arabia U17
- 2025–2026: Internacional U20
- 2026: Volta Redonda

Mário Jorge dos Santos Silva (born 10 February 1978), known as Mário Jorge, is a Brazilian football coach and former futsal coach.

== Career ==
Mário Jorge began his career as a futsal coach of Helênico Atlético Clube in 1997. He left the club in December 2010, and became a coach of Madureira's futsal team; prior to that, in the previous August, he also began working as a scout at Audax Rio.

Mário Jorge was also a coach of Audax's under-15 football squad while working as a futsal coach of Clube Bradesco. On 15 January 2015, he became the new head coach of the under-15 squad of Vasco da Gama.

On 20 April 2016, Mário Jorge left Vasco to take over the under-13 team of Flamengo. He subsequently worked in the club's under-14, under-15, under-17 and under-20 squads before taking over the first team for the opening match of the 2023 season, a 1–0 Campeonato Carioca win over former club Audax, as the under-20 squad was utilized.

Mário Jorge was back in charge of Fla during a 1–1 draw against Bangu on 24 January 2023, as the first team was resting for the 2023 Supercopa do Brasil. After returning to the under-20s, he became an interim head coach of the club on 11 April, after Vítor Pereira was sacked.

Mário Jorge was ahead of Flamengo on two occasions: a 2–0 loss to Maringá and a 3–0 win over Coritiba before returning to the under-20 team after the appointment of Jorge Sampaoli. He again became an interim on 28 September 2023, after Sampaoli was dismissed.

On 7 June 2024, Mário Jorge left Flamengo to take over the Saudi Arabia national under-17 team. After qualifying the side to the 2025 FIFA U-17 World Cup, he returned to his home country after being named head coach of the under-20 team of Internacional on 25 August of that year.

On 28 April 2026, Mário Jorge was named head coach of Série C side Volta Redonda. He was dismissed on 10 August, after only three wins in 15 matches.

== Personal life ==
Mário Jorge is named after worldwide known former player and coach Mário Jorge Lobo Zagallo.

== Coaching statistics ==
As of 7 April 2024

Coaching record by team and tenure
Team	Nat.	From	To	Record								Ref
Team	Nat.	From	To	G	W	D	L	GF	GA	GD	Win %	Ref
Flamengo U20	(Brazil)	9 May 2022	7 June 2024	100	61	17	22	187	95	+92	61.00	
Flamengo (interim) (Note: He was in charge of a under-20 side during the 2023 Campeonato Carioca, as the main squad opted not to play in that match.)	(Brazil)	12 January 2023	12 January 2023	1	1	0	0	1	0	+1	100.00	
Flamengo (interim)	(Brazil)	24 January 2023	24 January 2023	1	0	1	0	1	1	+0	0.00	
Flamengo (interim)	(Brazil)	11 April 2023	16 April 2023	2	1	0	1	3	2	+1	50.00	
Flamengo (interim)	(Brazil)	28 September 2023	9 October 2023	2	1	1	0	2	1	+1	50.00	
Flamengo (interim) (Note: He was in charge of a under-20 side during the 2024 Campeonato Carioca, as the main squad opted not to play in those matches.)	(Brazil)	20 January 2024	28 January 2024	2	0	2	0	1	1	+0	0.00	
Volta Redonda	(Brazil)	28 April 2026	10 August 2026	15	3	5	7	11	21	−10	20.00	
Career total				123	67	26	30	206	121	+85	54.47	—

== Honours ==
Flamengo U17

- Campeonato Brasileiro Sub-17: 2021
- Copa do Brasil Sub-17: 2021
- Supercopa do Brasil Sub-17: 2021

Flamengo U20

- Campeonato Brasileiro Sub-20: 2023
- U-20 Copa Libertadores: 2024
