= Grêmio FBPA (youth) =

Association football club in Brazil

Grêmio FBPA Academy
- Full name: Grêmio Foot-Ball Porto Alegrense Academy
- Nicknames: Imortal Tricolor (Immortal Tricolor); Tricolor dos Pampas (Tricolor of the Pampas); Rei de Copas (King of Cups); Clube de Todos (Club of All)
- Ground: CT Presidente Hélio Dourado; Eldorado do Sul, Brazil
- Capacity: 2,163
- President: Odorico Roman
- General Coordinator: Francesco Barletta
- Website: www.gremio.net
Home colors	Away colors

Grêmio FBPA Academy is the youth set up of Grêmio. Is composed of several youth teams from the age group of under-7 to the under-20, and is considered one of the most prolific football academies in Brazil as also in the world.

Notable academy graduates in recent years include Intercontinental Cup winner Renato Portaluppi, 2002 FIFA World Cup winner and two-time FIFA Ballon d'Or recipient Ronaldinho Gaúcho, former Liverpool midfielder Lucas Leiva, former Juventus midfielder Emerson, ChievoVerona winger Douglas Costa, former Grêmio goalkeeper Danrlei, UEFA Champions League winner midfielder Anderson, 2002 FIFA World Cup winner centre-back Ânderson Polga, Al-Shabab goalkeeper Marcelo Grohe, 2016 Summer Olympic Games Gold Medal forward Luan, Flamengo winger Everton, alongside many first team players, such as midfielder Arthur, wingers Tetê and Gabriel Mec, goalkeeper Gabriel Grando and centre-backs Gustavo Martins and Viery.

The club has a large academy training complex, named CT Presidente Hélio Dourado, based in Eldorado do Sul, in the metropolitan area of Porto Alegre, which includes a small stadium where all the youth teams play their home matches.

== Under-20 ==
The under-20 team, also known as juniores, is made up mostly of under-20 players who have reached the last senior year beneath the professional level, and provides further development for players before joining the transition team or the first team. During the season, the under-20 regularly plays in the state league and also in national and international competitions, such as the Taça Belo Horizonte de Futebol Júnior, Copa São Paulo de Futebol Júnior, Campeonato Brasileiro Sub-20, Torneo di Viareggio, among others. The current head coach is Kauê Belmonte.

=== Under-20 squad ===
As of 12 November 2026

Note: Flags indicate national team as defined under FIFA eligibility rules; some limited exceptions apply. Players may hold more than one non-FIFA nationality.

No.	Pos.	Nation	Player
—	GK	BRA	João Victor
—	GK	BRA	Mateus Bertolo
—	GK	BRA	Vitão
—	DF	BRA	Andelison
—	DF	BRA	Bernardo Ferreira
—	DF	BRA	Bernardo Tramontini
—	DF	BRA	David Brendo
—	DF	BRA	Emanuel
—	DF	BRA	Higor
—	DF	BRA	Lucas Rian
—	DF	ECU	Maikel Borja
—	DF	BRA	Murilo Tramontini
—	DF	BRA	Vagner
—	DF	BRA	Vitor Ramon
—	MF	BRA	Adrielson
—	MF	BRA	Artur Júnior
—	MF	BRA	Danillo
—	MF	BRA	Iago Valeije
—	MF	BRA	Izaac Lobato

No.	Pos.	Nation	Player
—	MF	BRA	Jeferson
—	MF	BRA	Jeferson Forneck
—	MF	BRA	João Borne
—	MF	BRA	João Freitas
—	MF	BRA	Mickaell
—	MF	BRA	Rafael Gomes
—	MF	BRA	Smiley (captain)
—	MF	BRA	Zortea
—	FW	BRA	Alexsandro
—	FW	BRA	Anthonny
—	FW	BRA	Benjamin
—	FW	BRA	Fellipe Magalhães
—	FW	BRA	Gabriel Heinriky
—	FW	BRA	Harlley
—	FW	BRA	João Scatolin
—	FW	BRA	Lucca
—	FW	BRA	Santiago
—	FW	JPN	Tenshiro Takasaki (on loan from Machida Zelvia)
—	FW	BRA	Vini Ferraz

=== Staff ===
- Head coach: Kauê Belmonte
- Assistant coach: Enzo Lodovici
- Fitness coach: Felipe Matos
- Assistant fitness coach: César Camargo
- Goalkeeper coach: Humberto Flores

== Under-17 ==
The under-17 team, also as Juvenil, is formed by players aged until 17-years old, being the last step before reaching the under-19 and under-20 (junior) levels. During the season, competes regularly in the first tier of the Campeonato Gaúcho Sub-17 and national competitions such as the Copa do Brasil Sub-17, Copa Santiago de Futebol Juvenil, among international competitions as well.

=== Under-17 squad ===
As of 9 July 2021.

== Honours ==
=== U-23 ===
==== International ====
- "China-Latin American Cup 2017" International Football Tournament (CHN): 1

2017

==== National ====
- Campeonato Brasileiro Sub-23: 1

2021

=== U-20 ===
==== International ====
- Blue Stars/FIFA Youth Cup (SWI): 1

2001
Runners-up: 2002

- Trofeo Angelo Dossena (ITA): 1

2008

- Torneio Internacional de Monthey (SWI): 1

2002

==== National ====
- Campeonato Brasileiro Sub-20: 2

2008, 2009
Runners-up: 2006

- Taça Belo Horizonte de Juniores: 2

2008, 2012
Runners-up: 1985, 1986

- Copa Rio Grande do Sul de Futebol Sub-20: 3

2008, 2009, 2019

==== Regional ====
- Taça Cidade de Londrina (PR): 1

1990

- Campeonato Gaúcho Sub-20: 8

1996, 1999, 2000, 2005, 2006, 2007, 2014, 2023
Runners-up: 1991, 1992, 1994, 1998, 2012, 2018

=== U-19 ===
==== Regional ====
- Copa FGF Sub-19: 1

2012
Runners-up: 2013

=== U-18 ===
==== International ====
- SBS Cup International Youth Soccer (JAP): 1

1996

- Copa da Amizade (JAP): 1

2005

- Copa Mitad Del Mundo (ECU): 1

2018

=== U-17 ===
==== International ====
- Raiffeisenbank Vorallgäu Cup (GER): 1

2012

- Torneo Las Américas (COL): 1

2019

- Copa Santiago de Futebol Juvenil (BRA): 7

1995, 1996, 1997, 1998, 2000, 2008, 2019
Runners-up: 1989, 1991, 1993, 2001, 2005, 2017

==== National ====
- Copa Macaé de Juvenis: 1

2004

- Torneio Super Brasileirinho de Futebol/Copa Eucatur: 1

2007

- Aldeia International Cup: 1

2019

==== Regional ====
- Campeonato Gaúcho Sub-17: 11

1993, 1994, 1995, 1996, 2001, 2002, 2003, 2009, 2014, 2015, 2023
Runners-up: 1997, 1999, 2000, 2005, 2006, 2007 e 2008

- Copa FGF Sub-17: 1

2010

- Copa Dênis Lawson: 1

2005

=== U-16 ===
- SC Cup (3): 2000, 2001, 2010
- Copa Carpina (PE) (1): 2012
- Copa Paraná (2): 1996, 1997
- Quadrangular de Futebol de Cotia (SP) (1): 2016
- Campeonato Gaúcho Sub-16 (1): 2014
- Copa Teutônia Adidas (RS) (8): 2008, 2009

=== U-15 ===
- Copa Votorantim Sub-15 (SP) (2): 2008, 2010
- Copa do Brasil Sub-15 (PR) (2): 2002, 2007
- Copa Brasil de Futebol Infantil Laranjal Paulista (PR) (1): 1998
- Copa da Amizade Brasil-Japão (1): 2017
- BH Youth Cup (MG) (1): 2012
- Campeonato 'Base Brasil 2020' (BRA) (1): 2017
- Copa Lages de Futebol (SC) (1): 2013
- Copa dos Campeões (PR) (1): 2007
- Campeonato Gaúcho Sub-15 (10): 2001, 2002, 2004, 2007 2009, 2012, 2013, 2014 e 2015, 2024
- Campeonato Gaúcho - Noligafi (1): 2012
- Taça da Amizade de Futebol Roca Sales (RS) (2): 2005, 2006
- Copa Mellita (RS) (2): 1997, 1998

=== U-14 ===
- Mundialito de Futebol Infantil (URU) (1): 2007
- Mundialito de Futebol Infantil - Copa Cidade de Maracaibo (VEN) (1): 2007
- Quadrangular de Futebol de Cotia (SP) (1): 2016
- Copa Nacional de Futebol Vale do Piquiri (PR) (1): 2008
- Campeonato Gaúcho - Noligafi (2): 2012, 2016
- Copa Internacional de Flores da Cunha (RS) (1):2004

=== U-13 ===
- IberCup World-Cascais (POR) (1): 2017
- Efipan (5): 1985, 2006, 2010, 2014, 2016
- Torneo de Futbol Infantil Valesanito (ARG) (1): 2017
- Torneo Internacional Primavera Roja (URU) (1): 2017
- Copa Cidade Verde (BRA) (1): 2018
- BGprime League (SC) (1): 2017
- Taça Saudades de Futebol (SC) (1): 2008
- Copa Cidade de São Ludgero (SC) (1): 2016
- Copa dos Campeões (PR) (1): 2007
- Campeonato Gaúcho - Noligafi (10): 2012, 2013, 2014, 2015, 2016, 2017, 2018, 2019, 2021, 2022
- Copa Sul Brasileira (RS) (2): 2008, 2010
- Copa Teutônia Adidas (RS) (2): 2008, 2009
- Copa Nova Prata de Futebol (RS) (1): 2009
- Taça Cidade de São Gabriel (RS) (1): 2008
- Copa Nova Bréscia de Futebol (RS) (1): 2007

=== U-12 ===
- Go Cup (BRA) (1): 2018
- Torneo Argentinito de San Carlos (ARG) (1): 2017
- Copa Cidade Verde (BRA) (6): 2007, 2012, 2013, 2014, 2015, 2016
- Taça Brasil de Campo Bom (RS) (1): 2018
- Copa Nacional de Futebol Vale do Piquiri (PR) (1): 2008
- Campeonato Gaúcho - Noligafi (6): 2014, 2015, 2017, 2018, 2019, 2022
- Copa Sarandi (RS) (1): 2017
- Taça Cidade de Tuparendi (RS) (1): 2017
- Copa Teutônia Adidas (RS) (1): 2011
- Copa Nova Prata de Futebol (RS) (1): 2009
- Copa Nova Bréscia de Futebol (RS) (1): 2007
- Copa Sinodal Progresso de Montenegro (RS) (1): 2007

=== U-11 ===
- Torneio Confraternidad Deportiva (URU) (1): 2013
- Torneo de Futbol Infantil Valesanito (ARG) (1): 2017
- Torneio Internacional de Fútbol Infantil Esperanzas Pritty (ARG) (1): 2011
- Efipan de Primavera (3): 2011, 2014, 2016
- Go Cup (BRA) (1): 2017
- Copa Cidade Verde (BRA) (7): 2010, 2011, 2012, 2014, 2015, 2016, 2017
- Taça Saudades de Futebol (SC) (6): 2006, 2007, 2009, 2010, 2012, 2014
- Copa Cidade de São Ludgero (SC) (2): 2016, 2017
- Copa dos Campeões (PR) (1): 2007
- Campeonato Gaúcho - Noligafi (7): 2014, 2016, 2017, 2018, 2019, 2021, 2022
- Copa Pequeno Gigante (RS) (1): 2018
- Torneio Internacional Cidade de Uruguaiana (RS) (1): 2011
- Taça Ijuí (RS) (1): 2013
- Sul Cup (RS) (1): 2008

=== U-10 ===
- Torneo Argentinito de San Carlos (ARG) (1): 2017
- Torneio Confraternidad Deportiva (URU) (1): 2013
- Copa Cidade Verde (BRA) (3): 2016, 2017, 2018
- Campeonato Gaúcho - Noligafi (7): 2013, 2015, 2016, 2017, 2018, 2019, 2021, 2022
- Copa Pequeno Gigante (RS) (1): 2018
- Taça Cidade de Tuparendi (RS) (2): 2015, 2017
- Torneio de Base GE Sandense (RS) (2): 2013, 2016
- Taça Ijuí (RS) (1): 2013
- Sul Cup (RS) (1): 2008

== See also ==
- Grêmio FBPA
