= Bruno César =

Brazilian footballer (born 1988)

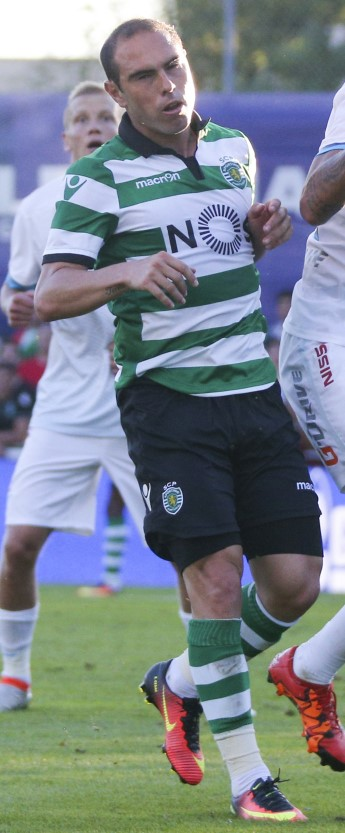
- Bruno César playing for Sporting in 2016

Personal information
- Full name: Bruno César Zanaki
- Date of birth: 3 November 1988 (age 38)
- Place of birth: Santa Bárbara d'Oeste, Brazil
- Height: 1.77 m (5 ft 10 in)
- Position: Attacking midfielder

Team information
- Current team: XV de Piracicaba

Youth career
- 2005–2006: Bahia
- 2007: São Paulo
- 2007: Palmeiras
- 2008: Grêmio

Senior career*
Years	Team	Apps	(Gls)
2009	Ulbra	3	(1)
2009	Noroeste	12	(1)
2009–2010	Santo André	22	(8)
2010–2011	Corinthians	49	(15)
2011–2013	Benfica	32	(10)
2013–2015	Al-Ahli	26	(8)
2014	→ Palmeiras (loan)	15	(0)
2015	Estoril	10	(1)
2015–2018	Sporting	69	(7)
2019–2021	Vasco da Gama	36	(4)
2020–2021	→ Penafiel (loan)	25	(4)
2021–2022	Penafiel	15	(0)
2023–	XV de Piracicaba	7	(0)
Total		321	(58)

International career
2011	Brazil	2	(0)
- * Club domestic league appearances and goals as of 8 February 2023

Bruno César Zanaki (born 3 November 1988) is a Brazilian professional footballer who plays as an attacking midfielder for XV de Piracicaba.

== Club career ==
=== Early career ===
Bruno César began his professional career with Ulbra in 2009, before moving on to Noroeste in the same season. At Noroeste, he made his senior debut against Ituano in the Campeonato Paulista, where he came on as a 64th-minute substitute.

Following the end of the 2009 Campeonato Paulista, Bruno César moved to Campeonato Brasileiro Série A side Santo André. At Santo André, he made his professional league debut away to Coritiba. His professional league debut saw him score Santo André's fourth in a 4–2 away win. For the 2010 season, he managed to break through into Santo André's starting 11 where he scored 7 goals in 21 appearances and helped his side reach the 2010 Campeonato Paulista final, where his side lost to Santos over two legs.

=== Corinthians ===
Bruno César would join Corinthians from Campeonato Brasileiro Série B side in May 2010. He debuted for the Timão on 27 May in a Campeonato Brasileiro Série A match against Grêmio Barueri. He marked his first team debut with a goal which would tie the match at 2–2. His debut season with Corinthians saw him score 14 goals in 31 matches, which helped his side finish third in the league, thus granting his side qualification to the 2011 Copa Libertadores first stage. His impressive first season with Corinthians would see him be awarded by the Brazilian Football Confederation (CBF) with the Campeonato Brasileiro Série A Best Newcomer award.

Bruno César's second season with Corinthians would see him feature regularly in Corinthians' 2011 Campeonato Paulista campaign, where he helped his side reach the final of the competition, where they were defeated by Santos. Prior to start of the 2011 league campaign, he would be transferred to Benfica.

=== Benfica ===
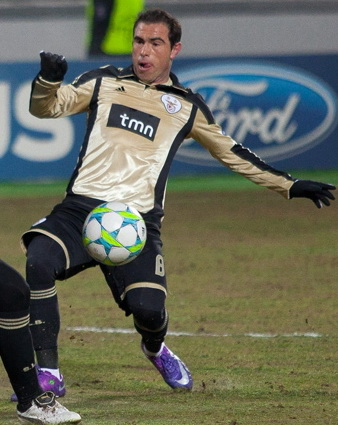
Bruno César playing for Benfica in 2012

On 28 March 2011, Benfica announced the acquisition of Bruno César for a reported €6 million transfer fee, with Bruno César moving to the Encarnados in the summer.

Bruno César made his Benfica debut against Trabzonspor in a UEFA Champions League third round qualifying match. On 20 August, he made his Primeira Liga debut against Feirense at the Estádio da Luz, where he scored in injury time. His goal-scoring form in the league would continue in the next several matches with goals against Nacional and Académica de Coimbra.

Bruno César's goal-scoring form would see then Benfica head coach Jorge Jesus select him in his starting 11. Jesus' selection of the player would pay off, as Bruno César scored in Benfica's second Champions League group stage match against Oțelul Galați. He would continue to demonstrate his goal-scoring form, scoring in a third round Taça de Portugal match against Portimonense. In Benfica's next UEFA Champions League match, he would play a pivotal role in an important win – he helped his side pick up an important away win at Basel by scoring Benfica's first goal in a 2–0 win at St. Jakob-Park.

Following his excellent goal scoring form, Bruno César suffered a two-month goal scoring drought through November and December. He ended his scoring drought by scoring in an away match against União de Leiria. After January 2013, Bruno César played an important role in Benfica's end-of-season fortunes. Despite Benfica losing the Primeira Liga title to rivals Porto, he helped his side claim the Taça da Liga title for a fourth consecutive season, and helped the Encarnados reach the quarter-finals of the UEFA Champions League, where they were defeated by eventual winners Chelsea.

The arrivals of wingers Eduardo Salvio and Ola John saw Bruno César feature less for his club side in the domestic league campaign for the 2012–13 season. He would be utilized by Jorge Jesus primarily in the Taça de Portugal, Taça da Liga and the UEFA Champions League campaigns. The first half of the 2012–13 season would see Bruno César make 16 appearances, six of which came in the Primeira Liga. His limited playing time during the first half of the season would see him leave the club in January 2013.

=== Al-Ahli ===
On 21 January 2013, Bruno César joined Saudi club Al-Ahli Jeddah after the club paid Benfica a €5.5 million transfer fee.

Bruno César made his debut for his new club against Al-Wehda in a Saudi Professional League match. He made his continental debut for Al-Ahli in a 2013 AFC Champions League group stage match, against Qatari side Al-Gharafa on 27 February. César would score his first league goal against Ettifaq on 3 March, in a 4–1 away win.

The following week would see Bruno César score again, this time a brace against Najran, which would help his side defeat the opposition 5–1. His goal-scoring form would continue as he scored three goals in continental competitions against Iranian side Sepahan Isfahan (twice) and Qatari side El Jaish.

=== Sporting CP ===
On 31 July 2015, Bruno César joined Estoril from Al-Ahli Jeddah for a €2 million transfer fee. On 14 November 2015, after just 11 matches for Estoril, he joined Sporting CP on a free transfer and signed a four-year contract lasting until June 2020. He scored two goals in his Sporting debut, against Vitória de Setúbal. By the end of the season, he played 18 matches in all competition, scoring four goals.

=== XV de Piracicaba ===
For the 2023 season, Bruno César moved to XV de Piracicaba.

== International career ==
Bruno César received his first international call-up by Brazil national team manager Mano Menezes for international friendlies against the Gabon and Egypt in November 2011.

César debuted for the Canarinha on 10 November in a 2–0 win against Gabon. His second cap came four days later against Egypt in another 2–0 win.

== Career statistics ==
=== Club ===
Appearances and goals by club, season and competition
Club	Season	League			State league		National cup		League cup		Continental		Other		Total	
Club	Season	Division	Apps	Goals	Apps	Goals	Apps	Goals	Apps	Goals	Apps	Goals	Apps	Goals	Apps	Goals
Ulbra	2009	Gaúcho	—		3	1	—		—		—		—		3	1
Noroeste	2009	Paulista	—		12	1	—		—		—		—		12	1
Santo André	2009	Série A	1	0	—		—		—		—		—		1	0
Santo André	2010	Série B	—		21	7	—		—		—		—		21	7
Santo André	Total		1	1	21	7	—		—		—		—		22	8
Corinthians	2010	Série A	31	14	—		—		—		0	0	—		31	14
Corinthians	2011	Série A	—		18	1	—		—		1	0	—		19	1
Corinthians	Total		31	14	18	1	—		—		1	0	—		50	15
Benfica	2011–12	Primeira Liga	26	10	—		2	1	4	0	12	2	—		44	13
Benfica	2012–13	Primeira Liga	6	0	—		3	0	2	0	5	0	—		16	0
Benfica	Total		32	10	—		5	1	6	0	17	2	—		60	13
Al-Ahli	2012–13	Saudi Pro League	8	3	—		4	2	—		7	3	—		19	8
Al-Ahli	2013–14	Saudi Pro League	8	4	—		0	0	0	0	2	0	—		11	4
Al-Ahli	2014–15	Saudi Pro League	10	1	—		1	0	1	1	7	1	—		19	3
Al-Ahli	Total		26	8	—		5	2	1	1	16	4	—		48	15
Palmeiras (loan)	2014	Série A	7	0	8	0	5	2	—		—		—		20	2
Estoril	2015–16	Primeira Liga	10	1	—		1	0	0	0	—		—		11	1
Sporting CP	2015–16	Primeira Liga	16	4	—		0	0	1	0	1	0	—		18	4
Sporting CP	2016–17	Primeira Liga	31	3	—		4	1	1	0	6	2	—		42	6
Sporting CP	2017–18	Primeira Liga	18	0	—		5	0	3	0	7	2	—		33	2
Sporting CP	2018–19	Primeira Liga	4	0	—		1	0	0	0	0	0	—		5	0
Sporting CP	Total		69	7	—		10	1	5	0	14	4	—		97	12
Vasco da Gama	2019	Série A	13	2	14	2	3	0	—		—		—		30	4
Vasco da Gama	2020	Série A	7	0	2	0	2	0	—		—		—		11	0
Vasco da Gama	Total		20	2	16	2	5	0	—		—		—		41	4
Penafiel (loan)	2020–21	Liga Portugal 2	25	4	—		1	1	—		—		—		26	5
Penafiel	2021–22	Liga Portugal 2	14	0	—		0	0	0	0	—		—		14	0
Penafiel	2022–23	Liga Portugal 2	1	0	—		—		—		—		—		1	0
Penafiel	Total		40	4	—		1	1	0	0	—		—		41	5
XV de Piracicaba	2023	Paulista	—		7	0	—		—		—		—		7	0
Career total			236	46	85	12	32	7	17	1	48	8	0	0	418	74

=== International ===
Appearances and goals by national team and year
National team	Year	Apps	Goals
Brazil	2011	2	0
Total		2	0

== Honours ==
=== Club ===
Grêmio

- Campeonato Brasileiro Sub-20: 2008
- Taça Belo Horizonte de Juniores: 2008

Corinthians

- Campeonato Brasileiro Série A: 2011

Benfica

- Taça da Liga: 2011–12

Al Ahli

- Saudi Crown Prince Cup: 2014–15

Sporting CP

- Taça da Liga: 2017–18
- Taça de Portugal: 2018–19

=== Individual ===
- Campeonato Brasileiro Série A Best Newcomer: 2010
