= João Scatolin =

Brazilian footballer

Personal information
- Full name: João Paulo Scatolin
- Date of birth: 18 May 2008 (age 18)
- Place of birth: Barão, Brazil
- Height: 1.81 m (5 ft 11 in)
- Position: Forward

Team information
- Current team: Grêmio

Youth career
- 2017–2026: Juventude
- 2026–: Grêmio

Senior career*
Years	Team	Apps	(Gls)
2025–2026	Juventude	1	(0)
- * Club domestic league appearances and goals as of 04:21, 20 November 2025 (UTC)

João Paulo Scatolin (born 18 May 2008) is a Brazilian footballer who plays as a forward for Campeonato Brasileiro Série A club Grêmio.

== Career ==
Born in Barão, Rio Grande do Sul, Scatolin joined Juventude's youth sides in 2017, aged nine. In October 2025, he began training with the first team, and renewed his contract until 2029.

Scatolin made his first team – and Série A – debut on 26 October 2025, coming on as a second-half substitute for Gilberto in a 3–1 away loss to Grêmio. In September of the following year, he moved to the latter club on a four-year contract, initially for the under-20s.

== Career statistics ==
As of 12 November 2026

Club	Season	League			State League		Cup		Continental		Other		Total	
Club	Season	Division	Apps	Goals	Apps	Goals	Apps	Goals	Apps	Goals	Apps	Goals	Apps	Goals
Juventude	2025	Série A	1	0	0	0	0	0	—		5 (Note: Appearance(s) in Copa FGF)	1	6	1
Juventude	2026	Série B	0	0	0	0	1	0	—		6 (Note: Appearance(s) in Copa Sul-Sudeste)	0	7	0
Career total			1	0	0	0	1	0	0	0	11	1	13	1
