= CR Flamengo (youth) =

Brazilian sports club based in Rio de Janeiro

Flamengo Youth Academy
- Full name: Clube de Regatas do Flamengo Youth Academy
- Stadium: Estádio da Gávea
- Capacity: 4,000
- Coordinates: 22°58′41.59″S 43°13′15.72″W
- Vice president: Vitor Zanelli Albuquerque
- Head coach: Bruno Pivetti (U-20); Daniel Franklin (U-17)
- League: Campeonato Brasileiro Sub-20; Campeonato Brasileiro Sub-17
- 2023 2023: U-20, 1st of 20; U-17, 4th of 20
- Website: www.flamengo.com.br/futebol-base
Home colors	Away colors	Third colors

The Clube de Regatas do Flamengo Youth Academy (Brazilian Portuguese: Categorias de Base) are the youth academy of Clube de Regatas do Flamengo, a Brazilian football club based in Rio de Janeiro. Is composed of several youth teams and is considered one of the most prolific football academies in Brazil as also in the world.

Flamengo's Youth Squads of all categories have won trophies at national and international level. Numerous international players have graduated from the academy team. Notable academy graduates in recent years include Lyon midfielder Lucas Paquetá, Real Madrid forward Vinícius Júnior, 2016 Summer Olympic Games Gold Medal midfielder Renato Augusto alongside many first team players, such as midfielder Reinier Jesus.

The youth sector is composed of various squads divided by age groups. Clube de Regatas do Flamengo is responsible for over 100 young athletes in 5 different categories: U-11, U-13, U-15, U-17, U-20. The U-20 squad currently plays in the Campeonato Brasileiro Sub-20, the Copa do Brasil Sub-20, the Copa São Paulo de Futebol Júnior, the Campeonato Carioca Sub-20 and the Torneio Octávio Pinto Guimarães. The U-17 squad currently plays in the Campeonato Brasileiro Sub-17, the Copa do Brasil Sub-17 and the Campeonato Carioca Sub-17.

== Stadium ==
Flamengo's Youth Academy home stadium is nominally the Estádio da Gávea (officially named the Estádio José Bastos Padilha at Flamengo's Gávea Headquarters), which was inaugurated on September 4, 1938, and has a capacity of 4,000 people. The stadium is named after José Bastos Padilha, Flamengo's president at the time of the stadium's construction, from 1933 to 1937. Gávea Stadium is not actually located in the neighborhood of Gávea but rather in Leblon.

Since the 1990s, the stadium has been used almost exclusively for the club's youth and women's teams' matches, and as the training ground for the senior team.

== Ninho do Urubu ==
All the youth teams currently train at the club's main training ground, Ninho do Urubu, located in the Vargem Grande neighborhood, in the West Zone. These athletes have modern dormitories, living room, recreation room and cafeteria. The athletes also have medical, dental and psychological assistance.

On the morning of February 8, 2019 a fire broke out in the living quarters of several youth academy players while they were sleeping. Ten players between the ages of 14 and 17 were killed, and three others were hospitalized with burn injuries.

== Honours ==
=== Under-20s ===
Intercontinental
Competitions	Titles	Seasons
U20 Intercontinental Cup	2	2024, 2025
Continental
Competitions	Titles	Seasons
U-20 Copa Libertadores	2	2024, 2025
Domestic
Competitions	Titles	Seasons
Campeonato Brasileiro Sub-20	2	2019, 2023
Supercopa do Brasil Sub-20	1^{s}	2019
Inter-state
Competitions	Titles	Seasons
Taça Belo Horizonte de Juniores	3	1986, 2003, 2007
Copa São Paulo de Futebol Júnior	4	1990, 2011, 2016, 2018
State
Competitions	Titles	Seasons
Campeonato Carioca Sub-20	31	1921, 1936, 1942, 1943, 1945, 1946, 1956, 1957, 1958, 1960, 1965, 1967, 1972, 1973, 1979, 1980, 1983, 1985, 1986, 1989, 1990, 1993, 1994, 1996, 1999, 2005, 2006, 2007, 2015, 2018, 2019
Copa Rio Sub-20	11	1984, 1985, 1993, 2006, 2007, 2011, 2012, 2014, 2016, 2018, 2019
Taça Antônio Nicolau Santana	1	1980
Troféu Walter Vasconcelos	1	1980
Taça Álvaro Nascimento	1	1982
Troféu Rubens de Andrade Reis	1	1983
Taça Dario de Mello Pinto	1	1985
Taça Luiz Barbosa	1	1986
Copa Cultura de Juniores	1	2005
Taça Guanabara Sub-20	9	1989, 1990, 1992, 1996, 2005, 2006, 2007, 2015, 2018
Taça Rio Sub-20	9	1989, 1993, 1999, 2007, 2008, 2011, 2013, 2015, 2016
Others
Competitions	Titles	Seasons
Torneio da Associação Brasileira de Treinadores de Futebol	1	1980
Torneio Internacional da Coreia	1	1983
Torneio Fernando Horta	1	1989
Torneio Internacional da Venezuela	1	1993
Torneio Internacional da Holanda	1	1998
Torneio Internacional dos Emirados Árabes	1	2002

- record
- ^{S} shared record

=== Under-17s ===
Domestic
Competitions	Titles	Seasons
Campeonato Brasileiro Sub-17	2^{S}	2019, 2021
Copa do Brasil Sub-17	2	2018, 2021
Supercopa do Brasil Sub-17	1^{S}	2021
Inter-state
Competitions	Titles	Seasons
Copa Macaé de Juvenis	2	1999, 2006
State
Competitions	Titles	Seasons
Campeonato Carioca Sub-17	18	1980, 1981, 1984, 1987, 1988, 1991, 1993, 1994, 1995, 1997, 2004, 2006, 2007, 2010, 2012, 2016, 2017, 2024
Copa Rio Sub-17	8	1986, 1991, 1996, 1998, 2000, 2004, 2023, 2024
Recopa Carioca	1	2024
Taça Preguinho	2	1975, 1976
Taça Rio Sub-17	2	1991, 2006
Taça Guanabara Sub-17	2	2006, 2012
Others
Competitions	Titles	Seasons
Torneio Antônio do Passo	1	1959
Copa Circuito das Águas	2	2006, 2007

- record
- ^{S} shared record

=== Under-15s ===
National
Competitions	Titles	Seasons
Copa Votorantim Sub-15	2	2015, 2017
State
Competitions	Titles	Seasons
Campeonato Carioca Sub-15	11	1969, 1980, 1984, 1986, 1988, 1992, 1996, 2001, 2007, 2016, 2018
Torneio Guilherme Embrey Infantil	2	2015, 2017
Taça Guanabara Sub-15	1	2012
Taça Rio Sub-15	1	2013
Others
Competitions	Titles	Seasons
Copa Volvo	1	1990
Copa da Amizade Brasil-Japão	4	1999, 2005, 2011, 2014
Copa Nike	1	2000
Mundialito de Futebol Sub-15	1	2002
Copa Juventude	1	2011
Lion City Cup	1	2011
Copa Dadazinho Super (MG)	1	2013
Copa 2 de Julho	1	2016

=== Under-13s ===
State
Competitions	Titles	Seasons
Campeonato Carioca Sub-13	1	2016

== Youth squads ==
=== Flamengo U20 squad ===
As of 20 August 2025

Note: Flags indicate national team as defined under FIFA eligibility rules; some limited exceptions apply. Players may hold more than one non-FIFA nationality.

No.	Pos.	Nation	Player
—	GK	BRA	Alysson
—	GK	BRA	Andrew
—	GK	BRA	Léo Nanetti
—	GK	BRA	Eduardo Jung
—	GK	BRA	João Vitor
—	GK	BRA	Lucas Furtado
—	GK	BRA	Raphael
—	DF	BRA	Daniel Sales
—	DF	BRA	Diego Santos
—	DF	BRA	Germano
—	DF	BRA	Gusttavo
—	DF	BRA	Iago Teodoro
—	DF	BRA	João Pedro Da Mata
—	DF	BRA	João Victor Carbone
—	DF	BRA	João Victor
—	DF	BRA	Julio Neto
—	DF	BRA	Lucas Barbosa
—	DF	BRA	Pedro Lemos
—	DF	BRA	Victor Thiago
—	DF	BRA	Wesley Juan
—	MF	BRA	Bill
—	MF	BRA	Fabiano (on loan from Audax)
—	MF	BRA	Felipe Vieira

No.	Pos.	Nation	Player
—	MF	BRA	Iago Lacerda
—	MF	BRA	Jean Carlos
—	MF	BRA	João Alves
—	MF	CHI	Joan Orellana (on loan from Universidad Católica)
—	MF	PAR	Jorge Mora
—	MF	BRA	Kauã Ferreira
—	MF	BRA	Kauan Pereira
—	MF	BRA	Luís Aucélio
—	MF	BRA	Magrão
—	MF	BRA	Manu
—	MF	BRA	Rodriguinho
—	MF	BRA	Thiago Medeiros (on loan from Atlético Goianiense)
—	MF	BRA	Joshua
—	FW	BRA	Felipe Lima
—	FW	BRA	Felipe Teresa
—	FW	BRA	Guilherme Gomes
—	FW	BRA	Isaque
—	FW	BRA	Lucas Oliveira
—	FW	NGR	Shola Ogundana
—	FW	BRA	Pedro Leão
—	FW	BRA	Rafael Vargas
—	FW	BRA	Victor Silva

=== Flamengo U17 squad ===
As of 24 July 2024

Note: Flags indicate national team as defined under FIFA eligibility rules; some limited exceptions apply. Players may hold more than one non-FIFA nationality.

No.	Pos.	Nation	Player
—	DF	BRA	Eduardo Gonçalves
—	DF	BRA	Erick
—	DF	BRA	Gladson
—	DF	BRA	Gustavo Gonçalo
—	DF	BRA	Hernandes
—	DF	BRA	Hugo
—	DF	BRA	Joaquim
—	DF	BRA	Júlio Pedro
—	DF	BRA	Sérgio Júnior
—	DF	BRA	Johny Góes
—	DF	BRA	Marcel Levy

No.	Pos.	Nation	Player
—	MF	BRA	Edmilson
—	MF	BRA	Euder
—	MF	BRA	Gabriel Cunha (on loan from Nova Iguaçu)
—	MF	BRA	Germano
—	MF	BRA	Manu
—	MF	BRA	Vitor Fonseca
—	FW	BRA	Luan Andrey
—	FW	BRA	Lucas Matheus
—	FW	BRA	Paulo Roberto
—	FW	BRA	Riquelmy
—	FW	BRA	Nicolas Borba

== Staff ==
=== Flamengo U20 current staff ===
As of 30 June 2025

Position	Name
Coaching staff
Head coach	(Brazil) Bruno Pivetti
Assistant coach	(Brazil) Luiz Felipe
Goalkeepers trainer	(Brazil) Breno Caetano
Medical staff
Fitness coach	(Brazil) Luiz Capella
Team doctor	(Brazil) Ricardo Steiner

=== Flamengo U17 current staff ===
As of 25 March 2025

Position	Name
Coaching staff
Head coach	(Brazil) Daniel Franklin
Assistant coach	(Brazil) Leonardo Ramos
Goalkeepers trainer	(Brazil) Fábio Pacobahyba
Medical staff
Fitness coach	(Brazil) Carlos Bezerra
Team doctor	(Brazil) Fernando Sassaki
Physiotherapist	(Brazil) Diego Pereira
Physiotherapist	(Brazil) Fernando Nascimento

== Players ==
=== Appearances ===
- Players with 100+ appearances for Flamengo.
- All matches, including friendlies and non-official matches.
- Players in **bold** currently still play for the club.
- Players in italic currently still play professional football.

As of 20 August 2025

Name	Nationality	Position	Flamengo career	Club apps.	Goals	Ref.
Adílio	Brazil	MF	1975–1987	617	129	
Andrade	Brazil	MF	1977–1988	570	29	
Cantarele	Brazil	GK	1973–1983; 1984–1989	557	0	
Carlinhos	Brazil	MF	1958–1969	514	23	
Jadir	Brazil	MF	1952–1962	498	7	
José Ufarte	Spain	FW	1958–1961; 1962–1964	106	16	
Juan	Brazil	DF	1996–2002; 2016–2019	332	32	
João Gomes	Brazil	MF	2020–2022	122	4	
Júlio César	Brazil	GK	1997–2004; 2018	287	0	
Júnior	Brazil	DF	1974–1984; 1989–1993	876	76	
Leandro	Brazil	DF	1978–1990	415	14	
Luiz Antônio	Brazil	MF	2011–2015	178	10	
Paulo Victor	Brazil	GK	2007–2017	173	0	
Rondinelli	Brazil	DF	1973–1981	407	12	
Tita	Brazil	FW	1977–1985	391	134	
Victor Hugo	Brazil	MF	2022–	106	6	
Welinton	Brazil	DF	2009–2014	152	5	
Wesley França	Brazil	DF	2021–2025	135	4	
Zico	Brazil	FW	1971–1983; 1985–1990	732	508	
Zinho	Brazil	MF	1986–1992; 2004–2005	470	63	

=== Internationals ===
- Players who made 10 appearances or more for his country at full international level.
- Players in **bold** currently still play for the club.
- Players in italic currently still play professional football.

As of 20 August 2024

Name	Country	National Football Team	
Name	Country	Apps	Goals
Andrade	Brazil	11	1
Adriano	Brazil	48	27
Carlos Mozer	Brazil	32	0
Djalminha	Brazil	14	5
João Gomes	Brazil	10	0
José Ufarte	Spain	16	2
Juan	Brazil	79	7
Júlio César	Brazil	87	0
Júnior	Brazil	74	6
Júnior Baiano	Brazil	25	2
Leandro	Brazil	27	2
Leonardo	Brazil	55	7
Lucas Paquetá	Brazil	55	11
Mário Zagallo	Brazil	33	5
Renato Augusto	Brazil	32	6
Richard Ríos	Colombia	23	2
Rodrigo	Spain	28	8
Sávio	Brazil	21	4
Thiago Alcântara	Spain	46	2
Tita	Brazil	32	6
Vinícius Júnior	Brazil	41	7
Zico	Brazil	71	48
Zinho	Brazil	57	7

=== Highest transfer fees received ===
- Top 10 highest transfer fees received.
- The list is ordered by the amount of R$ received.

**Rank**	**Nat.**	**Player**	**To**	Fee (R$)	Fee (US$)	**Fee (€)**	**Date**	**Ref**
1	(Brazil)	Vinícius Júnior	(Spain) Real Madrid	R$164 million	US$53.4 million	€45.0 million	July 2018	
2	(Brazil)	Lucas Paquetá	(Italy) Milan	R$150 million	US$40.3 million	€35.0 million	January 2018	
3	(Brazil)	Reinier Jesus	(Spain) Real Madrid	R$136 million	US$33.0 million	€30.0 million	January 2020	
4	(Brazil)	Matheus França	(England) Crystal Palace	R$104.4 million	US$22.0 million	€20.0 million	July 2023	
5	(Brazil)	João Gomes	(England) Wolverhampton Wanderers	R$103.2 million	US$20.3 million	€18.7 million	January 2023	
6	(Brazil)	Rodrigo Muniz	(England) Fulham	R$49.5 million	US$9.4 million	€8.0 million	August 2021	
7	(Brazil)	Léo Duarte	(Italy) Milan	R$42.2 million	US$11.1 million	€10.0 million	July 2019	
8	(Brazil)	Jean Lucas	(France) Lyon	R$34.0 million	US$9.0 million	€8.0 million	June 2019	
9	(Brazil)	Yuri César	(United Arab Emirates) Shabab Al Ahli	R$31.0 million	US$6.0 million	€4.9 million	January 2021	
10	(Brazil)	Jorge	(France) Monaco	R$30.4 million	US$9.6 million	€9.0 million	January 2017	

== Former coaches ==
- Coaches in **bold** currently still train for the club.
- Coaches in italic currently still train in professional football.

As of 29 January 2022

Name	Nationality	Academy career	Honours	Ref.
Ernesto Paulo	Brazil	1990	1990 Copa São Paulo de Futebol Júnior	
Zé Ricardo	Brazil	2005–2008; 2012–2016	2016 Copa São Paulo de Futebol Júnior	
Paulo Henrique Filho	Brazil	2011	2011 Copa São Paulo de Futebol Júnior; 2011 Copa Rio U-20	
Maurício Souza	Brazil	2016–2021	2018 Copa São Paulo de Futebol Júnior; 2018 Taça Guanabara U-20; 2018 Campeonato Carioca U-20; 2018 Copa Rio U-20; 2019 Taça Guanabara U-20; 2019 Campeonato Carioca U-20; 2019 Copa Rio U-20; 2019 Campeonato Brasileiro U-20; 2019 Supercopa do Brasil U-20	
Mário Jorge	Brazil	2016–2024	2024 U-20 Copa Libertadores; 2023 Campeonato Brasileiro Sub-20; 2019 Campeonato Brasileiro Sub-17; 2021 Supercopa do Brasil Sub-17	
Filipe Luís	Brazil	2024	2024 Copa Rio U-17; 2024 Under-20 Intercontinental Cup	

== See also ==
- CR Flamengo
