= Copa Macaé de Juvenis =

Under-17 football cup

The Macaé Youth Cup (Portuguese: Copa Macaé de Juvenis) was an under-17 football cup formed by Brazilian and international teams. The competition was organized by the Macaense Sporting League (Liga Macaense de Desportos) in association with the Rio de Janeiro Football Federation, and it ran from 1997 until 2009.

== Format ==
The competition format changed almost every year. Normally, the clubs were divided in several groups of four or five teams, and the two best-placed clubs of each groups qualify to the knockout stage.

All matches were usually played in July, in Macaé and other countryside Rio de Janeiro state cities, like Barra do Macaé, Campos dos Goytacazes, Carapebus, Córrego do Ouro, and Quissamã.

== Invited clubs ==
Usually traditional Brazilian clubs were invited, like Atlético Mineiro, Atlético Paranaense, Bahia, Botafogo, Corinthians, Coritiba, Cruzeiro, Flamengo, Fluminense, Grêmio, Internacional, and Vasco da Gama.

Among the non-Brazilian clubs which had disputed the competition, were América, Toluca and UNAM Pumas of Mexico, Pohang Iron and Steel Company (Posco) of South Korea and Shanghai Shenhua of China.

== List of champions ==
Year	Champion	Runner-up
1997	Botafogo	
1998	Vasco da Gama	
1999	Flamengo	
2000	Internacional	
2001	Internacional	Cruzeiro
2002	Fluminense	Vitória
2003	Fluminense	Vitória
2004	Grêmio	Vitória
2005	Internacional	Figueirense
2006	Flamengo	Fluminense
2007	Cruzeiro	Flamengo
2008	Cruzeiro	Paraná
2009	United States	Funorte

== Titles by club ==
Club	State	Titles
Internacional	Rio Grande do Sul	3 (2000, 2001 and 2005)
Cruzeiro	Minas Gerais	2 (2007 and 2008)
Flamengo	Rio de Janeiro	2 (1999 and 2006)
Fluminense	Rio de Janeiro	2 (2002 and 2003)
Botafogo	Rio de Janeiro	1 (1997)
Grêmio	Rio Grande do Sul	1 (2004)
United States		1 (2009)
Vasco da Gama	Rio de Janeiro	1 (1998)

=== Titles by state and country ===
State/country	Titles
Rio de Janeiro	6
Rio Grande do Sul	4
Minas Gerais	2
United States	1
