= 2008 Campeonato Brasileiro Sub-20 =

Brazilian football team season

The Campeonato Brasileiro Sub 20 2008 (Under-20 Brazilian Championship) was the 3rd edition of the annual tournament organized by FGF, the Rio Grande do Sul State Football Federation. Only players 20 years old or younger are allowed to play. The competition was contested by all teams on the Campeonato Brasileiro Série A 2008, except from Vasco and São Paulo, which were replaced by Corinthians and Juventude. It began on December 8 and the final match was played on December 21, 2008.

The matches were played at four stadiums: Passo D'Areia and PUC Sport Stadium in Porto Alegre; Morada dos Quero-Queros in Alvorada; and Municipal Farroupilha in Alegrete.

After reaching the final for the second time in tournament history, Grêmio won its first title. They beat city rivals Internacional in the semifinal match and then, in the final match, they came back from a 0-1 score against Sport to win the tournament.

== Results ==
=== First stage ===
==== Group 1 ====
Team		Pts	P	W	D	L	GF	GA	GD
1	Náutico	9	4	3	0	1	6	3	3
2	Grêmio	7	4	2	1	1	13	3	10
3	Coritiba	7	4	2	1	1	8	3	5
4	Botafogo	4	4	1	1	2	1	6	-5
5	Corinthians	1	4	0	1	3	1	13	-12

	NAU	GRE	CTB	BOT	COR
Náutico	—	1-0	0-2	3-0	2-1
Grêmio	0-1	—	2-2	3-0	7-0
Coritiba	2-0	2-2	—	0-1	4-0
Botafogo	0-3	0-3	1-0	—	0-0
Corinthians	1-2	0-7	0-4	0-0	—

==== Group 2 ====
Team		Pts	P	W	D	L	GF	GA	GD
1	Goiás	7	4	2	1	1	8	6	2
2	Santos	7	4	2	1	1	6	9	-3
3	Vitória	6	4	1	3	0	7	5	2
4	Juventude	5	4	1	2	1	7	4	3
5	Cruzeiro	1	4	0	1	3	4	8	-12

	GOI	SAN	VIT	JUV	CRU
Goiás	—	2-3	2-2	2-0	2-1
Santos	3-2	—	1-1	0-5	2-1
Vitória	2-2	1-1	—	1-1	3-1
Juventude	0-2	5-0	1-1	—	1-1
Cruzeiro	1-2	1-2	1-3	1-1	—

==== Group 3 ====
Team		Pts	P	W	D	L	GF	GA	GD
1	Ipatinga	7	4	2	1	1	5	4	1
2	Palmeiras	6	4	1	3	0	5	3	2
3	Figueirense	6	4	1	3	0	5	4	1
4	Fluminense	3	4	0	3	1	6	7	-1
5	Atlético Mineiro	2	4	0	2	2	3	6	-3

	IPA	PAL	FIG	FLU	CAM
Ipatinga	—	0-2	1-1	2-1	2-0
Palmeiras	2-0	—	0-0	1-1	2-2
Figueirense	1-1	0-0	—	3-3	1-0
Fluminense	1-2	1-1	3-3	—	1-1
Atlético Mineiro	0-2	2-2	0-1	1-1	—

==== Group 4 ====
Team		Pts	P	W	D	L	GF	GA	GD
1	Internacional	9	4	3	0	1	9	3	6
2	Sport	6	4	2	0	2	5	6	-1
3	Portuguesa	6	4	2	0	2	4	5	-1
4	Atlético Paranaense	4	4	1	1	2	2	3	-1
5	Flamengo	4	4	1	1	2	4	7	-3

	INT	SPT	POR	CAP	FLA
Internacional	—	3-0	0-2	2-0	4-1
Sport	0-3	—	3-0	0-2	2-1
Portuguesa	2-0	0-3	—	1-0	1-2
Atlético Paranaense	0-2	2-0	0-1	—	0-0
Flamengo	1-4	1-2	2-1	0-0	—

=== Quarterfinals ===
December 16, 2008

Náutico	2 – 2 (3–2 p.k.)	Palmeiras

Estádio Municipal Farroupilha, Alegrete

December 16, 2008

Ipatinga	1 – 3	Grêmio

Estádio Morada dos Quero-Queros, Alvorada

December 17, 2008

Goiás	0 – 1	Sport

Estádio Passo D'Areia, Porto Alegre

December 17, 2008

Internacional	4 – 0	Santos

Estádio Passo D'Areia, Porto Alegre

=== Semifinals ===
December 19, 2008

Náutico	0 – 0 (0–3 p.k.)	Sport

Estádio Passo D'Areia, Porto Alegre

December 19, 2008

Grêmio	2 – 1	Internacional

Estádio Passo D'Areia, Porto Alegre

=== Third-place match ===
December 21, 2008

Náutico	0 – 4	Internacional

Estádio Passo D'Areia, Porto Alegre

=== Final ===
December 21, 2008

Sport	1 – 2	Grêmio

Estádio Passo D'Areia, Porto Alegre

Campeonato Brasileiro Sub 20
2008 Winners
Grêmio
First Title
