= Taça Belo Horizonte de Juniores =

- Founded: 1985
- Region: Brazil
- Teams: 28
- Current champions: São Paulo (2016)
- Most championships: Atlético Mineiro (6 times)
- 2016 Taça Belo Horizonte de Juniores

The Taça Belo Horizonte de Juniores (or Belo Horizonte Youth Cup, in English), also known as Taça Belo Horizonte de Futebol Júnior or Taça BH, is a cup competition usually played by 36 Brazilian under-20 football teams, most of them from Minas Gerais state.

The 2006 competition's trophy was named after Telê Santana.

== Format ==
In the first stage the 36 teams are divided in 6 groups. The top 2 of each group, plus the top four 3rd placed teams, qualify to the knockout stage. From the round of 16 to the final there are only one-leg matches, as all matches are played in Minas Gerais state.

An edition of this cup lasts about 40 days.

== List of champions ==
=== U-20 ===
Year	Champion	Runner-up
1985	Cruzeiro	Grêmio
1986	Flamengo	Grêmio
1987	São Paulo	Corinthians
1988	Atlético Mineiro	Santa Tereza
1989	Atlético Mineiro	Valeriodoce
1990	Inter de Limeira	Flamengo
1991	Vasco da Gama	Atlético Paranaense
1992	Vasco da Gama	Atlético Mineiro
1993	Cruzeiro	Atlético Mineiro
1994	Vitória	Vasco da Gama
1995	Cruzeiro	América-MG
1996	Atlético Paranaense	Cruzeiro
1997	São Paulo	Colo-Colo (Chile)
1998	Palmeiras	São Paulo
1999	Botafogo	Flamengo
2000	América-MG	Goiás
2001	Cruzeiro	Santos
2002	Palmeiras	Cruzeiro
2003	Flamengo	Atlético Paranaense
2004	Cruzeiro	Fluminense
2005	Atlético Mineiro	Bahia
2006	Atlético Paranaense	Atlético Mineiro
2007	Flamengo	Cruzeiro
2008	Grêmio	Cruzeiro
2009	Atlético Mineiro	Internacional
2010	Coritiba	Atlético Paranaense
2011	Atlético Mineiro	Fluminense
2012	Grêmio	Flamengo
2013	Vasco da Gama	Vitória
2014	América-MG	Atlético Mineiro

=== U-17 ===
Year	Champion	Runner-up
2015	Corinthians	Flamengo
2016	São Paulo	Palmeiras
2017	São Paulo	Flamengo
2018	Atlético Mineiro	Fluminense

== Titles by team ==
Champion	Titles	Years won
Atlético Mineiro	6	1988, 1989, 2005, 2009, 2011, 2018
Cruzeiro	5	1985, 1993, 1995, 2001, 2004
São Paulo	4	1987, 1997, 2016, 2017
Flamengo	3	1986, 2003, 2007
Vasco da Gama	3	1991, 1992, 2013
América-MG	2	2000, 2014
Atlético Paranaense	2	1996, 2006
Grêmio	2	2008, 2012
Palmeiras	2	1998, 2002
Botafogo	1	1999
Corinthians	1	2015
Coritiba	1	2010
Inter de Limeira	1	1990
Vitória	1	1994
