= Supercopa do Brasil Sub-17 =

Official Brazilian national football tournament for U-17 teams

- Founded: 2019
- Country: Brazil
- Number of clubs: 2
- Current champions: Flamengo (1st title) (2021)
- Most championships: Flamengo, Palmeiras, São Paulo (1 title each)
- Broadcaster(s): SporTV

The Supercopa do Brasil Sub-17, is an official Brazilian national football super cup tournament for U-17 teams, reuniting the champions of Campeonato Brasileiro Sub-17 and Copa do Brasil Sub-17 of the season.

== List of champions ==
Following there are all the Supercup U-17 editions:

Year	Champion	Score	Runners-up
2019	Palmeiras; SP; 2019 Copa do Brasil Sub-17 winners	2–0; 2–3	Flamengo; RJ; 2019 Campeonato Brasileiro Sub-17 winners
2020	São Paulo; SP; 2020 Copa do Brasil Sub-17 winners	1–1; 4–2 (pen.)	Fluminense; RJ; 2020 Campeonato Brasileiro Sub-17 winners
2021	Flamengo; RJ; 2021 Campeonato Brasileiro and Copa do Brasil Sub-17 winners		
2022–2025	Not held		

=== Titles by club ===
Titles	Club
1	Flamengo
1	Palmeiras
1	São Paulo

== See also ==
- Supercopa do Brasil Sub-20
