= Dom Bosco Catholic University =

Catholic university in western Brazil

- Universidade Católica Dom Bosco
- Coat of arms of the university
- Other names: UCDB
- Type: Private, non-profit
- Established: November 24, 1961
- Affiliations: Roman Catholic Church
- Rector: Pe. José Marinoni
- Location: Campo Grande, Mato Grosso do Sul, Brazil
- Campus: Urban
- Colors: Red & blue
- Website: www.ucdb.br

The Dom Bosco Catholic University (Portuguese: Universidade Católica Dom Bosco, UCDB) is a private, non-profit Catholic university, located in Campo Grande, the capital of the State of Mato Grosso do Sul, in western Brazil. It is maintained by the Catholic Archdiocese of Campo Grande.

The Salesian mission of Mato Grosso do Sul introduced the first center for higher education in the state of Mato Grosso do Sul in 1961. Located in Campo Grande, the Dom Aquino School of Philosophy, Science and Letters, offered courses in pedagogy and literature, focused on training of educators, mentors, and change agents in society of the state. Gradually the Salesian Mission created new schools including the School of Law in 1965, the School of Economics, Management, and Accounting in 1970, and the School of Social Work in 1972. In subsequent years, courses were added in history, geography, science (biology and mathematics), philosophy, and psychology, and a graduate school was opened.

Aiming to become a university, the Salesian Mission received approval from the Ministry of Education and Culture for the integration of the schools with a unified regimen of study. On December 20, 1989, the Salesian Mission filed its Consultation Letter with the Federal Education Council, demanding recognition as a university under the name Dom Bosco Catholic University. The Consultation Letter was approved on February 21, 1991. The university next would be monitored to ensure the maturation of its academic and administrative staff. On October 27, 1993, the monitoring period was completed and the schools became Dom Bosco Catholic University.
