= Campeonato Brasileiro Sub-23 =

Official Brazilian national football tournament for U-23 teams

- Founded: 2010
- Country: Brazil
- Divisions: 1
- Level on pyramid: 1
- Current champions: Red Bull Bragantino (1st title) (2024)
- Most championships: Internacional (3 titles)
- Broadcaster(s): SporTV

The Campeonato Brasileiro Sub-23, also known as Campeonato Brasileiro de Futebol de Aspirantes, is the official Brazilian national football tournament for U-23 teams.

== List of champions ==
Following there are all the championship editions:

Year	Champion	Runners-up	Topscorer
Organized by Traffic Group
2010	Internacional; RS	Corinthians; SP	Guto (Internacional); 7 goals
2011–2016	Not held		
Organized by CBF
2017	Internacional; RS	Santos; SP	Diego Cardoso (Santos); 6 goals
2018	São Paulo; SP	Internacional; RS	Eronildo (Vitória); 10 goals
2019	Internacional; RS	Grêmio; RS	Ferreirinha (Grêmio); 11 goals
2020	Ceará; CE	Vila Nova; GO	Elias (Grêmio); 8 goals
2021	Grêmio; RS	Ceará; CE	Elias (Grêmio); 11 goals
2022	Cuiabá; MT	Red Bull Bragantino; SP	Guilherme Santos (Red Bull Bragantino); 7 goals
2023	Suspended		
2024	Red Bull Bragantino; SP	Botafogo; RJ	Bruno Lopes (Vasco da Gama); Kauê (Botafogo); Rodriguinho (CRB); Werik Popó (Criciúma); 4 goals

=== Titles by club ===
Titles	Club
3	Internacional
1	Ceará
1	Cuiabá
1	Grêmio
1	Red Bull Bragantino
1	São Paulo

== See also ==
- Campeonato Brasileiro Sub-20
- Campeonato Brasileiro Sub-17
