= Supercopa do Brasil Sub-20 =

Official Brazilian national football tournament for U-20 teams

- Founded: 2017
- Country: Brazil
- Number of clubs: 2
- Current champions: Internacional (1st title) (2021)
- Most championships: Five clubs (1 title each)
- Broadcaster(s): SporTV

The Supercopa do Brasil Sub-20, is an official Brazilian national football super cup tournament for U-20 teams, reuniting the champions of Campeonato Brasileiro Sub-20 and Copa do Brasil Sub-20 of the season.

== List of champions ==
Following there are all the Supercup U-20 editions:

| Year | Champion | Score | Runners-up |
|---|---|---|---|
| 2017 | Cruzeiro; MG; 2017 Campeonato Brasileiro Sub-20 winners | 0–0; 2–2; 4–2 (pen.) | Atlético Mineiro; MG; 2017 Copa do Brasil Sub-20 winners |
| 2018 | São Paulo; SP; 2018 Copa do Brasil Sub-20 winners | 4–3; 1–2; 5–4 (pen.) | Palmeiras; SP; 2018 Campeonato Brasileiro Sub-20 winners |
| 2019 | Flamengo; RJ; 2019 Campeonato Brasileiro Sub-20 winners | 3–0; 0–1 | Palmeiras; SP; 2019 Copa do Brasil Sub-20 winners |
| 2020 | Vasco da Gama; RJ; 2020 Copa do Brasil Sub-20 winners | 2–2; 7–6 (pen.) | Atlético Mineiro; MG; 2020 Campeonato Brasileiro Sub-20 winners |
| 2021 | Internacional; RS; 2021 Campeonato Brasileiro Sub-20 winners | 1–0 | Coritiba; PR; 2021 Copa do Brasil Sub-20 winners |
| 2022–2025 | Not held | | |

=== Titles by club ===
| Titles | Club |
|---|---|
1
| 1 | Cruzeiro |
| 1 | Flamengo |
| 1 | São Paulo |
| 1 | Vasco da Gama |
| 1 | Internacional |

== See also ==
- Supercopa do Brasil Sub-17
