= Campeonato Brasileiro Sub-17 =

Football tournament for U-17 teams in Brazil

- Founded: 2019
- Country: Brazil
- Domestic cup: Copa do Brasil Sub-17
- Current champions: Corinthians (1st) (2026)
- Most championships: Flamengo; Fluminense; Palmeiras (2 titles each)
- Broadcaster: SporTV

The Campeonato Brasileiro Sub-17, is the official Brazilian national football tournament for U-17 teams.

== List of champions ==
Following there are all the championship editions:

Year	Champion	Runners-up	Top scorer
2019	Flamengo; RJ	Corinthians; SP	Lázaro (Flamengo); 14 goals
2020	Fluminense; RJ	Athletico Paranaense; PR	Kayky (Fluminense); 12 goals
2021	Flamengo; RJ	Vasco da Gama; RJ	Emersonn (Athletico Paranaense); 13 goals
2022	Palmeiras; SP	Grêmio; RS	Felipe Chiqueti (Athletico Paranaense); 11 goals
2023	Palmeiras; SP	São Paulo; SP	Ryan Francisco (São Paulo); 14 goals
2024	Fluminense; RJ	Palmeiras; SP	Luca Meirelles (Santos); 14 goals
2025	Atlético Mineiro; MG	Grêmio; RS	Davi Alves (Athletico Paranaense); 19 goals
2026	Corinthians; SP	Cruzeiro; MG	Thaylon (Cruzeiro); 19 goals

=== Titles by club ===
Titles	Club
2	Flamengo
2	Palmeiras
2	Fluminense
1	Atlético Mineiro
1	Corinthians

== See also ==
- Campeonato Brasileiro Sub-23
- Campeonato Brasileiro Sub-20
- Copa do Brasil Sub-17
