= Copa do Brasil Sub-17 =

Brazilian football competition

- Founded: 2013
- Region: Brazil
- Teams: 32
- Current champions: Athletico Paranaense (1st title)
- Most championships: Palmeiras (4 titles)
- Broadcaster(s): ESPN Brasil; SporTV

The Copa do Brasil Sub-17 (English: Brazil Under-17 Cup) is a Brazilian football competition run by the Brazilian Football Confederation for under–17 teams. The first edition was played from July 2013 to August of the same year.

== Finals ==
Following is the list with champions and runners-up per edition:

Year	Champion	Runner-up	First leg	Second leg	Aggregate score
2013	São Paulo	Flamengo	2–0	3–1	5–1
2014	Atlético Mineiro	Grêmio	1–0	1–1	2–1
2015	Vitória	Botafogo	1–3	3–1	4–4 (4–3 p)
2016	Corinthians	Sport	2–2	2–0	3–1
2017	Palmeiras	Corinthians	1–0	0–1	1–1 (4–3 p)
2018	Flamengo	Fluminense	1–1	1–0	2–1
2019	Palmeiras	São Paulo	2–3	2–0	4–3
2020	São Paulo	Fluminense	0–0	2–1	2–1
2021	Flamengo	São Paulo	3–1	3–0	6–1
2022	Palmeiras	Vasco da Gama	4–1	2–4	6–5
2023	Palmeiras	Athletico Paranaense	4–1	—N/a	4–1
2024	Fluminense	São Paulo	2–1	—N/a	2–1
2025	Vasco da Gama	Bahia	2–2 (5–3 p)	—N/a	2–2 (5–3 p)
2026	Athletico Paranaense	Atlético Mineiro	2–2 (4–3 p)	—N/a	2–2 (4–3 p)

== Winners and runners-up ==
Club	Wins	Last final won	Runners-up	Last final lost
Palmeiras	4	2017, 2019, 2022, 2023	0	
São Paulo	2	2013, 2020	3	2019, 2021, 2024
Flamengo	2	2018, 2021	1	2013
Fluminense	1	2024	2	2018, 2020
Atlético Mineiro	1	2014	1	2026
Athletico Paranaense	1	2026	1	2023
Corinthians	1	2016	1	2017
Vasco da Gama	1	2025	1	2022
Vitória	1	2015	0	
Grêmio	0		1	2014
Botafogo	0		1	2015
Sport	0		1	2016
Bahia	0		1	2025
