= 2024 Recopa Gaúcha =

- Event: Recopa Gaúcha
Grêmio	São Luiz
Campeonato Gaúcho	Copa FGF
0	2
- Date: 28 February 2024
- Venue: Estádio 19 de Outubro, Ijuí
- Referee: Rafael Rodrigo Klein
- Attendance: 3,437

The 2024 Recopa Gaúcha was the 11th edition of an annual football match contested by the winners of the Campeonato Gaúcho and the Copa FGF in the previous season. The competition is considered a Super Cup of football in Rio Grande do Sul, being organized by FGF. The current holders are Grêmio, and they will be able to defend his title by winning the 2023 Campeonato Gaúcho.

== Qualified teams ==
Club	Qualification	Titles	First title	Last title	First appearance	Total appearances	Last appearance
Grêmio	2023 Campeonato Gaúcho champions	4	2019	2023	2019	5	2023
São Luiz	2023 Copa FGF champions	–	–	–	2023	1	2023

== Match ==
=== Details ===
28 February 2024
19:30 UTC-03:00

São Luiz	2–0	Grêmio
Bruno Uvini 45+2' (o.g.); Gabriel Pereira 71'	Report

Estádio 19 de Outubro, Ijuí
Referee: Rafael Rodrigo Klein

São Luiz	Grêmio

GK	1	(Brazil) Raul
DF	2	(Brazil) João Vitor
DF	14	(Brazil) Ricardo Thalheimer
DF	15	(Brazil) Wesley Junio
DF	6	(Brazil) Márcio Duarte
MF	5	(Brazil) Lucas Hulk	(red card) 90+6'
MF	17	(Brazil) Felipe Baiano		(substituted off) 79'
MF	18	(Brazil) Ramires		(substituted off) 65'
FW	20	(Brazil) Leandro Córdova		(substituted off) 45'
FW	9	(Brazil) Gabriel Morbeck	(yellow card) 51'	(substituted off) 59'
FW	23	(Brazil) Luquinha		(substituted off) 59'
Substitutes:
GK	12	(Brazil) Luiz Felipe
DF	3	(Brazil) Bruno Jesus
MF	4	(Brazil) Mateus Santana
DF	7	(Brazil) Guilherme Dal Pian		(substituted in) 79'
MF	8	(Brazil) Gabriel Davis		(substituted in) 65'
MF	10	(Brazil) Diogo Sodré
FW	11	(Brazil) Vini Peixoto
DF	13	(Brazil) Douglas Dias
DF	16	(Brazil) Ricardo Liell
FW	19	(Brazil) Yan	(yellow card) 71'	(substituted in) 59'
MF	21	(Brazil) Gabriel Pereira		(substituted in) 59'
MF	22	(Argentina) Benjamín Borasi	(yellow card) 74'	(substituted in) 45'
Head coach:
(Brazil) Alessandro Telles

GK	31	(Brazil) Caíque
DF	2	(Brazil) Fabio
DF	36	(Brazil) Natã		(substituted off) 55'
DF	15	(Brazil) Bruno Uvini
DF	26	(Brazil) Mayk
MF	35	(Brazil) Ronald		(substituted off) 77'
MF	53	(Brazil) Gustavo Martins	(red card) 90+5'
MF	14	(Brazil) Nathan	(yellow card) 75'	(substituted off) 81'
FW	13	(Brazil) Everton Galdino		(substituted off) 55'
FW	77	(Brazil) André	(yellow card) 90+5'
FW	32	(Brazil) Nathan Fernandes		(substituted off) 55'
Substitutes:
GK	24	(Brazil) Thiago Beltrame
FW	22	(Argentina) Lucas Besozzi		(substituted in) 55'
DF	33	(Brazil) Igor Serrote
FW	38	(Brazil) Lian
FW	40	(Brazil) Jardiel		(substituted in) 77'
MF	43	(Brazil) Hiago
DF	44	(Brazil) Viery
FW	47	(Brazil) Rubens	(yellow card) 84'	(substituted in) 55'
MF	49	(Brazil) João Araújo	(yellow card) 90+3'	(substituted in) 55'
MF	50	(Brazil) Cheron		(substituted in) 81'
DF	51	(Brazil) Wesley Costa
DF	52	(Brazil) Athos
Head coach:
(Brazil) Alexandre Mendes

Assistant referees:
Tiago Augusto Kappes Diel
Jorge Eduardo Bernardi
Fourth official:
Erico Andrade de Carvalho
Fifth official:
Fabricio Lima Baseggio
Video assistant referee:
Leandro Pedro Vuaden

Match rules

- 90 minutes.
- Penalty shoot-out if scores still level.
- Twelve named substitutes.
- Maximum of five substitutions.

2024 Recopa Gaúcha winners
São Luiz
1st title
