= 2026 Botafogo FR season =

Botafogo
2026 season
- President: João Paulo Magalhães Lins
- Manager: Martín Anselmi (until 22 March); Rodrigo Bellão (caretaker, 28 March–2 April); Franclim Carvalho (2 April–18 August); Rodrigo Bellão (caretaker, from 19 August–16 September); Tite (from 17 September)
- Stadium: Estádio Nilton Santos
- Campeonato Brasileiro Série A: 12th
- Campeonato Carioca: Taça Rio winners
- Copa do Brasil: Fifth round
- Copa Libertadores: Third stage
- Copa Sudamericana: Round of 16
- Top goalscorer: League: Danilo (10); All: Danilo (13)
Home colours	Away colours	Third colours

The 2026 season is the 102nd year of competition for Botafogo FR, a Brazilian football club based in Rio de Janeiro. The team competes in the Série A, Campeonato Carioca, Copa do Brasil, and Copa Libertadores.

== Squad ==
=== First team squad ===
As of 13 February 2026.

Note: Flags indicate national team as defined under FIFA eligibility rules; some limited exceptions apply. Players may hold more than one non-FIFA nationality.

No.	Pos.	Nation	Player
1	GK	BRA	Raul
2	DF	BRA	Vitinho
3	DF	BRA	Ythallo
4	DF	URU	Mateo Ponte
7	FW	BRA	Artur
8	MF	BRA	Danilo
9	FW	ESP	Chris Ramos (on loan from Cádiz)
10	MF	ARG	Álvaro Montoro
11	FW	BRA	Matheus Martins
13	DF	BRA	Alex Telles
14	MF	COL	Jordan Barrera
15	DF	ANG	Bastos
16	FW	BRA	Nathan Fernandes
19	FW	BRA	Arthur Cabral

No.	Pos.	Nation	Player
20	DF	ARG	Alexander Barboza
21	DF	BRA	Marçal
22	GK	BRA	Neto
23	MF	URU	Santiago Rodríguez
24	GK	BRA	Léo Linck
25	MF	BRA	Allan
28	MF	BRA	Newton
30	FW	ARG	Joaquín Correa
31	DF	BRA	Kaio Pantaleão
37	FW	PAN	Kadir Barría
40	GK	ECU	Cristhian Loor
55	MF	BRA	Wallace Davi
77	FW	URU	Lucas Villalba
—	DF	BRA	Riquelme

=== Transfers In ===
Pos.	Player	Transferred from	Fee	Date	Source
DF	(Brazil) Ythallo	(Canada) Toronto FC II	Undisclosed	4 January 2026	
FW	(Uruguay) Lucas Villalba	(Uruguay) Nacional	$3,000,000	5 January 2026	
DF	(Brazil) Riquelme	(Brazil) Sport	Undisclosed	14 January 2026	
DF	(Colombia) Jhoan Hernández	(Colombia) Millonarios	Loan	10 February 2026	
MF	(Brazil) Edenilson	(Brazil) Grêmio	Undisclosed	18 February 2026	
MF	(Argentina) Cristian Medina	(Argentina) Estudiantes de La Plata	$100,000	20 February 2026	
FW	(Brazil) Júnior Santos	(Brazil) Atlético Mineiro	Loan	6 March 2026	
DF	(Venezuela) Nahuel Ferraresi	(Brazil) São Paulo	Loan	9 March 2026	
FW	(Spain) Chris Ramos	(Spain) Cádiz	€5,000,000	1 July 2026	
GK	(Brazil) Gabriel Batista	(Portugal) Santa Clara	Undisclosed	20 July 2026	
DF	(Uruguay) Lucas Monzón	(Uruguay) Racing Club de Montevideo	$800,000	20 July 2026	
DF	(Brazil) Paulinho	Unattached	Free	20 July 2026	
GK	(Brazil) Warleson	(Belgium) Cercle Brugge	€750,000	20 July 2026	
MF	(Angola) Domingos Andrade	(Portugal) FC Porto B	Undisclosed	22 July 2026	
FW	(Brazil) Danilo Pereira	(Scotland) Rangers	Loan	25 July 2026	
FW	(Brazil) Tiquinho Soares	Unattached	Free	26 August 2026	
DF	(Brazil) Arthur Chaves	(Germany) TSG Hoffenheim	Loan	4 September 2026	
MF	(Morocco) Hakim Ziyech	(Morocco) Wydad AC	Free	10 September 2026	

=== Transfers Out ===
Pos.	Player	Transferred to	Fee	Date	Source
MF	(Brazil) Marlon Freitas	(Brazil) Palmeiras	€5,500,000	4 January 2026	
MF	(Venezuela) Jefferson Savarino	(Brazil) Fluminense	Undisclosed	22 January 2026	
DF	(Argentina) Alexander Barboza	(Brazil) Palmeiras	$4,000,000	1 July 2026	
GK	(Brazil) Neto	(Italy) Juventus	Released	1 July 2026	
MF	(Uruguay) Diego Hernández	(Brazil) Sport Recife	Undisclosed	10 July 2026	
MF	(Brazil) Newton	(Brazil) São Paulo	€3,000,000	17 July 2026	
FW	(Spain) Chris Ramos	(Spain) Real Oviedo	Loan	20 July 2026	
FW	(Brazil) Nathan Fernandes	(Bulgaria) Ludogorets Razgrad	Loan	21 July 2026	
GK	(Brazil) Raul	(Portugal) AVS	Released	31 July 2026	
FW	(Brazil) Elias Manoel	(Mexico) Tijuana	Free	4 August 2026	
FW	(Argentina) Joaquín Correa	(Argentina) Estudiantes de La Plata	Undisclosed	7 August 2026	
MF	(Uruguay) Santiago Rodríguez	(United States) Columbus Crew	$7,000,000	2 September 2026	
DF	(Brazil) Ythallo	(Portugal) Santa Clara	Free	2 September 2026	

== Friendlies ==
4 July 2026 Brothers Cup	CSKA Moscow (Russia)	Cancelled	(Brazil) Botafogo	Moscow, Russia
				Stadium: VTB Arena

10 July 2026 Brothers Cup	Dynamo Moscow (Russia)	Cancelled	(Brazil) Botafogo	Moscow, Russia
				Stadium: VTB Arena

== Competitions ==
=== Overall record ===
Competition	First match	Last match	Starting round	Final position	Record							
Competition	First match	Last match	Starting round	Final position	Pld	W	D	L	GF	GA	GD	Win %
Campeonato Brasileiro Série A	29 January		Matchday 1		35	11	9	15	46	57	−11	31.43
Campeonato Carioca	15 January	7 March	Taça Guanabara	Taça Rio winners	10	5	1	4	12	8	+4	50.00
Copa do Brasil	21 April	14 May	Fifth round	Fifth Round	2	1	0	1	1	2	−1	50.00
Copa Libertadores	18 February	10 March	Second stage	Third stage	4	1	1	2	3	3	+0	25.00
Copa Sudamericana	9 April	20 August	Group stage	Round of 16	8	6	1	1	17	11	+6	75.00
Total					59	24	12	23	79	81	−2	40.68

Last updated: 18 November 2026
Source: Competitions

=== Campeonato Brasileiro Série A ===
==== League table ====
Pos	Team	Pld	W	D	L	GF	GA	GD	Pts	Qualification or relegation
10	Vasco da Gama	35	13	8	14	47	51	−4	47	Qualification for Copa Sudamericana group stage
11	São Paulo	35	12	8	15	39	40	−1	44	Qualification for Copa Sudamericana group stage
12	Botafogo	35	11	9	15	46	57	−11	42	Qualification for Copa Sudamericana group stage
13	Coritiba	35	11	9	15	40	52	−12	42	
14	Vitória	35	11	8	16	37	52	−15	41	

Updated to match(es) played on 19 November 2026. Source: CBF
Rules for classification: 1) points; 2) wins; 3) goal difference; 4) goals scored; 5) head-to-head results (only between two teams); 6) fewest red cards; 7) fewest yellow cards; 8) drawing of lots.

==== Results by round ====
Round	1	2	3	4	5	6	7	8	9	10	11	12	13	14	15	16	17	18	19	20	21	22	23	24	25	26	27
Ground	H	A	A	H	A	H	A	A	H	A	H	A	H	H	A	H	A	A	H	A	H	H	A	H	A	H	H
Result	W	L	L	D	L	L	L	W	W	W	D	W	D	L	D	W	D	L	W	W	W	D	L	L	L	D	D
Position	1	8	12	12	16	17	18	15	13	10	11	9	8	10	11	9	9	12	9	7	8	9	11	11	12	14	

Updated to match(es) played on 16 September 2026. Source:
A = Away; H = Home; W = Win; D = Draw; L = Loss

==== Matches ====
29 January 2026 1	Botafogo	4–0	Cruzeiro	Rio de Janeiro
21:30 UTC−3	Danilo 48', 85'; Matheus Martins 76'; Artur 90+1'	Report		Stadium: Nilton Santos; Attendance: 16,901; Referee: Matheus Delgado Candançan

4 February 2026 2	Grêmio	5–3	Botafogo	Porto Alegre
21:30 UTC−3	Carlos Vinícius 26', 50', 57' (pen.); Tetê 60'; Edenilson 79'	Report	Arthur Cabral 17'; Danilo 36', 86'	Stadium: Arena do Grêmio; Attendance: 18,573; Referee: Felipe Fernandes de Lima

12 February 2026 3	Fluminense	1–0	Botafogo	Rio de Janeiro
19:30 UTC−3	Acosta 55'	Report		Stadium: Maracanã; Attendance: 30,397; Referee: Rafael Rodrigo Klein

14 March 2026 6	Botafogo	0–3	Flamengo	Rio de Janeiro
20:30 UTC−3		Report	Lino 14'; Léo Pereira 45+2'; Pedro 50'	Stadium: Nilton Santos; Attendance: 16,176; Referee: Anderson Daronco

18 March 2026 7	Palmeiras	2–1	Botafogo	São Paulo
19:00 UTC−3	Allan 9'; Arias 53'	Report	Danilo 59'	Stadium: Allianz Parque; Attendance: 29,450; Referee: Rafael Rodrigo Klein

21 March 2026 8	Red Bull Bragantino	1–2	Botafogo	Bragança Paulista
16:00 UTC−3	Lucas Barbosa 15'	Report	Alex Telles 8' (pen.); Barboza 71'	Stadium: Estádio Cícero de Souza Marques; Attendance: 4,080; Referee: Lucas Casagrande

29 March 2026 5	Athletico Paranaense	4–1	Botafogo	Curitiba
19:30 UTC−3	Viveros 4', 45+3'; Aguirre 49'; Esquivel 81'	Report	Edenilson 43'	Stadium: Arena da Baixada; Referee: Paulo Cesar Zanovelli da Silva

1 April 2026 9	Botafogo	3–2	Mirassol	Rio de Janeiro
19:30 UTC−3	Arthur Cabral 11'; Alex Telles 43' (pen.); Júnior Santos 66'	Report	Shaylon 21'; Igor Formiga 90+2'	Stadium: Nilton Santos; Attendance: 6,781; Referee: Wilton Sampaio

4 April 2026 10	Vasco da Gama	1–2	Botafogo	Rio de Janeiro
21:00 UTC−3		Report		Stadium: São Januário

12 April 2026 11	Botafogo	2–2	Coritiba	Rio de Janeiro
16:00				Stadium: Estádio Olímpico Nilton Santos

18 April 2026 12	Chapecoense	1–4	Botafogo
18:30

25 April 2026 13	Botafogo	2–2	Internacional	Rio de Janeiro
18:30				Stadium: Estádio Olímpico Nilton Santos

2 May 2026 14	Botafogo	1–2	Remo	Rio de Janeiro
16:00				Stadium: Estádio Olímpico Nilton Santos

10 May 2026 15	Atlético Mineiro	1–1	Botafogo
16:00

17 May 2026 16	Botafogo	3–1	Corinthians	Rio de Janeiro
16:00				Stadium: Estádio Olímpico Nilton Santos

23 May 2026 17	São Paulo	1–1	Botafogo
17:00

30 May 2026 18	Bahia	2–1	Botafogo
17:30

16 July 2026 19	Botafogo	2–1	Santos	Rio de Janeiro
19:30				Stadium: Estádio Olímpico Nilton Santos

23 July 2026 4	Botafogo	0–0	Vitória	Rio de Janeiro
19:30				Stadium: Estádio Olímpico Nilton Santos

26 July 2026 20	Cruzeiro	0–1	Botafogo
16:00

8 August 2026 22	Botafogo	1–1	Fluminense	Rio de Janeiro
21:00				Stadium: Estádio Olímpico Nilton Santos

16 August 2026 23	Vitória	1–0	Botafogo
18:30

24 August 2026 24	Botafogo	2–3	Athletico Paranaense	Rio de Janeiro
20:00				Stadium: Estádio Olímpico Nilton Santos

30 August 2026 25	Flamengo	3–0	Botafogo	Rio de Janeiro
16:00

6 September 2026 26	Botafogo	0–0	Palmeiras	Rio de Janeiro
18:30				Stadium: Estádio Olímpico Nilton Santos

12 September 2026 27	Botafogo	1–1	Red Bull Bragantino	Rio de Janeiro
20:30				Stadium: Estádio Olímpico Nilton Santos

16 September 2026 21	Botafogo	3–2	Grêmio	Rio de Janeiro
19:30				Stadium: Estádio Olímpico Nilton Santos

19 September 2026 28	Mirassol	2–0	Botafogo	Mirassol
17:00 UTC−3

7 October 2026 29	Botafogo	1–2	Vasco da Gama	Rio de Janeiro
20:30 UTC−3

12 October 2026 30	Coritiba	1–1	Botafogo	Curitiba
16:00 UTC−3

17 October 2026 31	Botafogo	1–0	Chapecoense	Rio de Janeiro
18:00 UTC−3

24 October 2026 32	Internacional	3–0	Botafogo	Porto Alegre
16:30 UTC−3

28 October 2026 33	Remo	2–1	Botafogo	Belém
21:30 UTC−3

4 November 2026 34	Botafogo	1–0	Atlético Mineiro	Rio de Janeiro
21:30 UTC−3

18 November 2026 35	Corinthians	4–0	Botafogo	São Paulo
21:30 UTC−3	Kaio César 28', 60', 67'; Arthur Chaves 34' (o.g.)			Stadium: Neo Química Arena; Referee: Wilton Sampaio

=== Campeonato Carioca ===
==== Taça Guanabara ====
===== Group B table =====
Pos	Team	Pld	W	D	L	GF	GA	GD	Pts	Qualification or relegation
1	Botafogo	6	3	0	3	6	5	+1	9	Qualified for the Quarter-final
2	Madureira	6	2	2	2	5	6	−1	8	Qualified for the Quarter-final
3	Boavista	6	2	2	2	6	8	−2	8	Qualified for the Quarter-final
4	Flamengo	6	2	1	3	11	9	+2	7	Qualified for the Quarter-final
5	Nova Iguaçu	6	1	2	3	8	9	−1	5	Relegation stage
6	Maricá	6	1	0	5	5	10	−5	3	Relegation stage

Source: FERJ

===== Matches =====
15 January 2026 1	Portuguesa	0–2	Botafogo	Rio de Janeiro
19:00		Report	Caio Valle 53' (pen.); Lucas Camilo 90+2'	Stadium: Estádio Luso Brasileiro; Attendance: 2,135; Referee: Lucas Coelho Santos

18 January 2026 2	Sampaio Corrêa	2–1	Botafogo	Saquarema
20:30	Rodrigo 39'; Lucas Marreta 51'	Report	Kauan Toledo 5'	Stadium: Estádio Lourival Gomes; Attendance: 1,517; Referee: Júlio César de Oliveira

21 January 2026 3	Botafogo	1–0	Volta Redonda	Rio de Janeiro
19:00	Montoro 66'	Report		Stadium: Nilton Santos; Attendance: 5,910; Referee: Bruno Mota Correia

24 January 2026 4	Botafogo	2–0	Bangu	Rio de Janeiro
21:00	Rodríguez 55'; Alex Telles 75' (pen.)	Report		Stadium: Nilton Santos; Attendance: 5,630; Referee: Tarcizo Pinheiro Caetano

1 February 2026 5	Botafogo	0–1	Fluminense	Rio de Janeiro
21:00		Report	John Kennedy 69'	Stadium: Nilton Santos; Attendance: 8,596; Referee: Wagner do Nascimento Magalhães

8 February 2026 6	Vasco da Gama	2–0	Botafogo	Saquarema
18:00	Brenner 49'; Coutinho 63' (pen.)	Report		Stadium: Estádio Lourival Gomes; Attendance: 15,049; Referee: Yuri Elino Ferreira da Cruz

===== Final stage =====
15 February 2026 Quarter-finals	Botafogo	1–2	Flamengo	Rio de Janeiro
17:30	Barboza 54'	Report	Paquetá 19'; Pulgar 84'	Stadium: Nilton Santos; Attendance: 10,987; Referee: Bruno Arleu de Araújo

==== Taça Rio ====
Semi-finals

21 February 2026 First leg	Boavista	0–2	Botafogo	Saquarema
21:00		Report	Gabriel Justino 44'; Artur 47'	Stadium: Elcyr Resende

28 February 2026 Second leg	Botafogo	0–0 (2–0 agg.)	Boavista	Rio de Janeiro
19:30		Report		Stadium: Nilton Santos

Final

7 March 2026	Botafogo	3–1	Bangu	Rio de Janeiro
18:00	Edenilson 17'; Caio Valle 51'; Correa 58' (pen.)	Report	Luizinho 74'	Stadium: Nilton Santos

=== Copa do Brasil ===
==== Fifth round ====
21 April 2026 First leg	Botafogo	1–0	Chapecoense	Rio de Janeiro
17:00 (UTC-3)	Telles 90+1'	Report		Stadium: Nilton Santos; Attendance: 26,001; Referee: Rodrigo José Pereira de Lima

14 May 2026 Second leg	Chapecoense	2–0 (2–1 agg.)	Botafogo	Chapecó
18:00 (UTC-3)	Marcinho 20'; Bolasie 45+5'	Report		Stadium: Arena Condá; Attendance: 9,897; Referee: Davi de Oliveira Lacerda

=== Copa Libertadores ===
==== Qualifying rounds ====
Second stage

18 February 2026 First leg	Nacional Potosí (Bolivia)	1–0	(Brazil) Botafogo	Potosí, Bolivia
20:30 UTC−4	Baldomar 47'	Report		Stadium: Estadio Víctor Agustín Ugarte; Referee: Augusto Aragón (Ecuador)

25 February 2026 Second leg	Botafogo (Brazil)	2–0 (2–0 agg.)	(Bolivia) Nacional Potosí	Rio de Janeiro
21:30 UTC−3	Alex Telles 5'; Danilo 45+6'	Report		Stadium: Nilton Santos, Attendance: 28,318; Referee: Piero Maza (Chile)

Third stage

3 March 2026 First leg	Barcelona (Ecuador)	1–1	(Brazil) Botafogo	Guayaquil, Ecuador
19:30 UTC−5	Villalba 22'	Report	Matheus Martins 66'	Stadium: Estadio Monumental Isidro Romero Carbo; Referee: Wilmar Roldán (Colombia)

10 March 2026 Second leg	Botafogo (Brazil)	0–1 (1–2 agg.)	(Ecuador) Barcelona	Rio de Janeiro
21:30 UTC−3		Report	Céliz 8'	Stadium: Nilton Santos; Referee: Piero Maza (Chile)

=== Copa Sudamericana ===
==== Group stage ====
Pos	Team	Pld	W	D	L	GF	GA	GD	Pts	Qualification
1	(Brazil) Botafogo	6	5	1	0	15	5	+10	16	Advance to round of 16
2	(Venezuela) Caracas	6	2	3	1	9	9	0	9	Advance to knockout round play-offs
3	(Argentina) Racing	6	2	2	2	11	9	+2	8	
4	(Bolivia) Independiente Petrolero	6	0	0	6	3	15	−12	0	

Source: CONMEBOL

9 April 2026 1	Botafogo (Brazil)	1–1	(Venezuela) Caracas	Rio de Janeiro
19:00 UTC−3	Cabral 50'	Report	Correa 43'	Stadium: Nilton Santos; Referee: Kevin Ortega (Peru)

15 April 2026 2	Racing (Argentina)	2–3	(Brazil) Botafogo	Avellaneda, Argentina
19:00 UTC−3	S. Sosa 4'; Martínez 64'	Report	Cabral 23'; Júnior Santos 41'; Danilo 90+3'	Stadium: El Cilindro; Referee: Cristian Garay (Chile)

28 April 2026 3	Botafogo (Brazil)	3–0	(Bolivia) Independiente Petrolero	Rio de Janeiro
21:30 UTC−3	Ponte 15'; Montoro 62'; Newton 77'	Report		Stadium: Nilton Santos; Referee: Fernando Véjar (Chile)

6 May 2026 4	Botafogo (Brazil)	2–1	(Argentina) Racing	Rio de Janeiro
21:30 UTC−3	Di Cesare 19' (o.g.); Danilo 74'	Report	Martínez 49'	Stadium: Nilton Santos; Referee: Wilmar Roldán (Colombia)

20 May 2026 5	Independiente Petrolero (Bolivia)	0–3	(Brazil) Botafogo	Asunción, Paraguay (Note: The Independiente Petrolero v Botafogo match was moved to Estadio La Huerta in Asunción (Paraguay) due to civil unrest in Bolivia.)
20:00 UTC−4		Report	Medina 24'; Barrera 82'; Gutiérrez 87' (o.g.)	Stadium: Estadio La Huerta; Referee: Guillermo Guerrero (Ecuador)

27 May 2026 6	Caracas (Venezuela)	1–3	(Brazil) Botafogo	Caracas, Venezuela
18:00 UTC−4	Ramos 36' (o.g.)	Report	Ramos 61'; Kauan Toledo 72'; Correa 90+2'	Stadium: Estadio Olímpico de la UCV; Referee: Carlos Betancur (Colombia)

==== Final stages ====
===== Round of 16 =====
13 August 2026 First leg	Cienciano (Peru)	6–1	(Brazil) Botafogo	Cusco, Peru
19:30 UTC−3				Stadium: Estadio Garcilaso

20 August 2026 Second leg	Botafogo (Brazil)	1–0 (2–6 agg.)	(Peru) Cienciano	Rio de Janeiro
21:30 UTC−3	Danilo Pereira 8'

== Goalscorers ==
Rank	Pos.	Player	Serie A	Carioca	Copa	Libertadores	Sudamericana	Total
1	MF	(Brazil) Danilo	10	0	0	1	2	13
2	FW	(Brazil) Arthur Cabral	7	0	0	0	2	9
3	MF	(Brazil) Edenilson	6	1	0	0	0	7
3	DF	(Brazil) Alex Telles	4	1	1	1	0	7
5	FW	(Brazil) Matheus Martins	4	0	0	1	1	6
6	MF	(Uruguay) Santiago Rodríguez	2	1	0	0	0	3
6	MF	(Argentina) Álvaro Montoro	1	1	0	0	1	3
8	MF	(Argentina) Cristian Medina	1	0	0	0	1	2
8	DF	(Brazil) Gabriel Justino	1	1	0	0	0	2
8	MF	(Colombia) Jordan Barrera	1	0	0	0	1	2
8	MF	(Brazil) Kauan Toledo	0	1	0	0	1	2
8	FW	(Argentina) Joaquín Correa	0	1	0	0	1	2
8	MF	(Brazil) Caio Valle	0	2	0	0	0	2
14	DF	(Brazil) Vitinho	1	0	0	0	0	1
14	FW	(Panama) Kadir Barría	1	0	0	0	0	1
14	MF	(Uruguay) Lucas Villalba	1	0	0	0	0	1
14	DF	(Venezuela) Nahuel Ferraresi	1	0	0	0	0	1
14	MF	(Brazil) Huguinho	1	0	0	0	0	1
14	FW	(Brazil) Lucas Emanuel	1	0	0	0	0	1
14	FW	(Brazil) Júnior Santos	1	0	0	0	1	2
14	FW	(Brazil) Tiquinho Soares	1	0	0	0	0	1
14	MF	(Brazil) Lucas Camilo	0	1	0	0	0	1
14	DF	(Argentina) Alexander Barboza	0	1	0	0	0	1
14	MF	(Brazil) Artur	0	1	0	0	0	1
14	FW	(Spain) Chris Ramos	0	0	0	0	1	1
14	FW	(Brazil) Danilo Pereira	0	0	0	0	1	1
14	DF	(Uruguay) Mateo Ponte	0	0	0	0	1	1
