= 2024 Grêmio FBPA season =

Grêmio
2024 season
- President: Alberto Guerra
- Manager: Renato Portaluppi
- Stadium: Arena do Grêmio
- Campeonato Brasileiro Série A: 14th
- Campeonato Gaúcho: Winners
- Copa do Brasil: Round of 16
- CONMEBOL Libertadores: Round of 16
- Recopa Gaúcha: Runners-up
- Top goalscorer: League: Martin Braithwaite (8); All: Franco Cristaldo (13)
- Average home league attendance: 22,019
Home colours	Away colours	Third colours

The 2024 season was Grêmio Foot-Ball Porto Alegrense's 121st season in existence. In addition to the Campeonato Brasileiro Série A, Grêmio participated in this season's editions of the Copa do Brasil, the Campeonato Gaúcho, the Copa CONMEBOL Libertadores and the Recopa Gaúcha.

== Squad information ==
=== First team squad ===
As of 4 October 2024.

Note: Flags indicate national team as defined under FIFA eligibility rules; some limited exceptions apply. Players may hold more than one non-FIFA nationality.

No.	Pos.	Nation	Player
1	GK	ARG	Agustín Marchesín
2	DF	BRA	Fabio
3	DF	BRA	Pedro Geromel (captain)
4	DF	ARG	Walter Kannemann
5	DF	BRA	Rodrigo Ely
6	DF	BRA	Reinaldo (3rd captain)
7	FW	VEN	Yeferson Soteldo (on loan from Santos)
9	FW	URU	Matías Arezo
10	MF	ARG	Franco Cristaldo
11	MF	COL	Miguel Monsalve
14	MF	BRA	Nathan
15	MF	BRA	Edenilson
16	FW	CHI	Alexander Aravena
17	MF	BRA	Dodi
18	DF	BRA	João Pedro
19	FW	ESP	Diego Costa
20	MF	PAR	Mathías Villasanti (vice-captain)

No.	Pos.	Nation	Player
21	FW	ARG	Cristian Pavon
22	FW	DEN	Martin Braithwaite
23	MF	BRA	Pepê
26	DF	BRA	Mayk
28	DF	BRA	Jemerson
30	DF	BRA	Rodrigo Caio
32	FW	BRA	Nathan Fernandes
33	GK	BRA	Rafael Cabral (on loan from Cruzeiro)
35	MF	BRA	Ronald
36	DF	BRA	Natã Felipe
37	MF	BRA	Du Queiroz (on loan from Zenit)
41	GK	BRA	Felipe Scheibig
45	MF	BRA	Mila
53	DF	BRA	Gustavo Martins
77	FW	BRA	André Henrique
97	GK	BRA	Caíque

== Competitions ==
=== Overview ===
Competition	First match	Last match	Starting round	Final position	Record							
Competition	First match	Last match	Starting round	Final position	Pld	W	D	L	GF	GA	GD	Win %
Campeonato Brasileiro Série A	14 April	8 December	Matchday 1	14th	38	12	9	17	44	50	−6	31.58
Campeonato Gaúcho	20 January	6 April	First stage	Winners	16	11	3	2	33	14	+19	68.75
Copa do Brasil	30 April	7 August	Third round	Round of 16	4	1	3	0	3	1	+2	25.00
Copa CONMEBOL Libertadores	2 April	20 August	Group stage	Round of 16	8	4	1	3	10	8	+2	50.00
Recopa Gaúcha	28 February		Final	Runners-up	1	0	0	1	0	2	−2	0.00
Total					67	28	16	23	90	75	+15	41.79

Source: Soccerway

=== Recopa Gaúcha ===
28 February Final	São Luiz	2–0	Grêmio	Ijuí
19:30 UTC−3	Bruno Uvini 45+3' (o.g.); Gabriel Pereira 73'	Report		Stadium: Estádio 19 de Outubro; Attendance: 3,437; Referee: Rafael Rodrigo Klein

=== Campeonato Gaúcho ===
==== Results summary ====
Overall								Home						Away					
Pld	W	D	L	GF	GA	GD	Pts	W	D	L	GF	GA	GD	W	D	L	GF	GA	GD
11	7	2	2	23	10	+13	23	5	1	0	18	5	+13	2	1	2	5	5	0

Source: Soccerway

==== First stage ====
===== Table =====
Pos	Team	Pld	W	D	L	GF	GA	GD	Pts	Qualification or relegation
1	Internacional	11	9	1	1	21	7	+14	28	Qualification to Knockout stage
2	Grêmio	11	7	2	2	23	10	+13	23	Qualification to Knockout stage
3	Caxias	11	4	4	3	15	14	+1	16	Qualification to Knockout stage
4	Guarany de Bagé	11	4	4	3	12	15	−3	16	Qualification to Knockout stage
5	Juventude	11	4	3	4	15	9	+6	15	Qualification to Knockout stage

Source: Soccerway
Rules for classification: 1) Points; 2) Wins; 3) Goal difference; 4) Goals scored; 5) fewest red cards; 6) fewest yellow cards; 7) Draw in the headquarters of the FGF.

===== Results by matchday =====
Matchday	1	2	3	4	5	6	7	8	9	10	11
Ground	A	H	A	H	A	H	H	A	H	A	H
Result	L	W	W	W	W	W	D	D	W	L	W
Position	9	6	3	1	1	1	2	2	2	2	2

Source: Soccerway
A = Away; H = Home; W = Win; D = Draw; L = Loss

===== Matches =====
The first stage fixtures were announced on 29 November 2023.

Note: Match numbers indicated on the left hand side are references to the matchday scheduled by the Campeonato Gaúcho and not the order matches were played after postponements and rescheduled matches.

20 January 1	Caxias	2–1	Grêmio	Caxias do Sul
16:30 UTC−3	Tomas Bastos 60'; Álvaro 77'	Report	Gustavo Martins 8'	Stadium: Estádio Centenário; Attendance: 8,157; Referee: Rafael Rodrigo Klein

24 January 2	Grêmio	4–1	São José-RS	Porto Alegre
21:30 UTC−3	João Pedro 12'; Soteldo 35'; Cristaldo 55'; Reinaldo 82'	Report	Fábio Rampi 87' (pen.)	Stadium: Arena do Grêmio; Attendance: 17,071; Referee: Jonathan Benkenstein Pinheiro

28 January 3	Brasil (PE)	0–1	Grêmio	Pelotas
16:00 UTC−3		Report	André 65'	Stadium: Estádio Bento Freitas; Attendance: 4,043; Referee: Anderson Daronco

31 January 4	Grêmio	1–0	Juventude	Porto Alegre
21:30 UTC−3	Fabio 18'	Report		Stadium: Arena do Grêmio; Attendance: 23,267; Referee: Daniel Nobre Bins

3 February 5	Avenida	0–1	Grêmio	Santa Cruz do Sul
19:00 UTC−3		Report	Nathan Fernandes 35'	Stadium: Estádio dos Eucaliptos; Attendance: 2,108; Referee: Erico Andrade de Carvalho

6 February 6	Grêmio	2–0	Novo Hamburgo	Porto Alegre
21:30 UTC−3	André 49'; João Pedro Galvão 54' (pen.)	Report		Stadium: Arena do Grêmio; Attendance: 13,707; Referee: Roger Goulart

10 February 7	Grêmio	1–1	São Luiz	Porto Alegre
16:30 UTC−3	Galdino 88'	Report	Lucas Santos 59'	Stadium: Arena do Grêmio; Attendance: 15,660; Referee: Jonathan Benkenstein Pinheiro

14 February 8	Ypiranga-RS	0–0	Grêmio	Erechim
19:00 UTC−3		Report		Stadium: Estádio Colosso da Lagoa; Attendance: 4,825; Referee: Daniel Nobre Bins

17 February 9	Grêmio	6–2	Santa Cruz	Porto Alegre
16:30 UTC−3	Gustavo Nunes 14'; Cristaldo 16'; Pavon 67'; João Pedro 76'; João Pedro Galvão 78'; André 90'	Report	David Luís 25'; Jean Lucca 45+5'	Stadium: Arena do Grêmio; Attendance: 19,025; Referee: Lucas Guimarães Rechatiko Horn

25 February 10	Internacional	3–2	Grêmio	Porto Alegre
18:00 UTC−3	Maurício 26'; Alario 64'; Alan Patrick 90+8' (pen.)	Report	Renê 15' (o.g.); Villasanti 56'	Stadium: Estádio Beira-Rio; Attendance: 47,197; Referee: Anderson Daronco

2 March 11	Grêmio	4–1	Guarany de Bagé	Porto Alegre
16:30 UTC−3	Pavon 7', 50'; Geromel 48'; Diego Costa 66'	Report	Kannemann 33' (o.g.)	Stadium: Arena do Grêmio; Attendance: 16,483; Referee: Francisco Soares Dias

==== Knockout stage ====
===== Quarter-finals =====
10 March Single match	Grêmio	2–0	Brasil (PE)	Porto Alegre
18:30 UTC−3	Cristaldo 45+1'; Diego Costa 69'	Report		Stadium: Arena do Grêmio; Attendance: 31,056; Referee: Jonathan Benkenstein Pinheiro

===== Semi-finals =====
16 March First leg	Caxias	1–2	Grêmio	Caxias do Sul
16:30 UTC−3	Du Queiroz 76' (o.g.)	Report	Cristaldo 21'; Diego Costa 68' (pen.)	Stadium: Estádio Centenário; Attendance: 5,510; Referee: Roger Goulart

26 March Second leg	Grêmio	3–2 (5–3 agg.)	Caxias	Porto Alegre
21:00 UTC−3	Diego Costa 21', 39'; Cristaldo 30'	Report	Vitor Feijão 59'; Tomas Bastos 82'	Stadium: Arena do Grêmio; Attendance: 36,958; Referee: Jean Pierre Gonçalves Lima

===== Finals =====
30 March First leg	Juventude	0–0	Grêmio	Caxias do Sul
16:30 UTC−3		Report		Stadium: Estádio Alfredo Jaconi; Attendance: 18,413; Referee: Anderson Daronco

6 April Second leg	Grêmio	3–1 (3–1 agg.)	Juventude	Porto Alegre
16:30 UTC−3	Cristaldo 42'; Diego Costa 44'; Nathan Fernandes 87'	Report	Gilberto 5'	Stadium: Arena do Grêmio; Attendance: 54,158; Referee: Rafael Rodrigo Klein

=== Copa CONMEBOL Libertadores ===
==== Group stage ====
The draw for the group stage was held on 18 March 2024, 20:00 UTC−03:00, at the CONMEBOL Convention Centre in Luque, Paraguay.

Pos	Team	Pld	W	D	L	GF	GA	GD	Pts	Qualification	STR	GRE	HUA	EST
1	(Bolivia) The Strongest	6	3	1	2	8	6	+2	10	Advance to round of 16	—	2–0	4–0	1–0
2	(Brazil) Grêmio	6	3	1	2	7	5	+2	10	Advance to round of 16	4–0	—	0–2	1–1
3	(Chile) Huachipato	6	2	2	2	7	9	−2	8	Transfer to Copa Sudamericana	0–0	0–1	—	1–1
4	(Argentina) Estudiantes	6	1	2	3	7	9	−2	5		2–1	0–1	3–4	—

Source: CONMEBOL
Rules for classification: 1) Points; 2) Goal difference; 3) Goals scored; 4) Away goals scored; 5) CONMEBOL ranking.

2 April 1	The Strongest (Bolivia)	2–0	(Brazil) Grêmio	La Paz, Bolivia
21:00 UTC−3	Ursino 16'; Triverio 73'	Report		Stadium: Estadio Hernando Siles; Attendance: 10,782; Referee: Juan Benítez (Paraguay)

9 April 2	Grêmio (Brazil)	0–2	(Chile) Huachipato	Porto Alegre, Brazil
19:00 UTC−3		Report	Loyola 13'; Montes 45+6'	Stadium: Arena do Grêmio; Attendance: 35,578; Referee: Leodán González (Uruguay)

23 April 3	Estudiantes (Argentina)	0–1	(Brazil) Grêmio	La Plata, Argentina
19:00 UTC−3		Report	Nathan Fernandes 75'	Stadium: Estadio Jorge Luis Hirschi; Attendance: 22,065; Referee: Gustavo Tejera (Uruguay)

29 May 6	Grêmio (Brazil)	4–0	(Bolivia) The Strongest	Curitiba, Brazil
19:00 UTC−3	Soteldo 14'; João Pedro 50'; Galdino 67'; Gustavo Nunes 89'	Report		Stadium: Estádio Couto Pereira; Attendance: 23,107; Referee: Andrés Matonte (Uruguay)

4 June 4	Huachipato (Chile)	0–1	(Brazil) Grêmio	Talcahuano, Chile
21:00 UTC−3		Report	Diego Costa 6'	Stadium: Estadio Huachipato; Attendance: 4,520; Referee: Jhon Ospina (Colombia)

8 June 5	Grêmio (Brazil)	1–1	(Argentina) Estudiantes	Curitiba, Brazil
19:00 UTC−3	Cristaldo 48'	Report	Méndez 83'	Stadium: Estádio Couto Pereira; Attendance: 32,572; Referee: Esteban Ostojich (Uruguay)

==== Round of 16 ====
The draw for the round of 16 was held on 3 June 2024, 13:00 UTC−03:00, at the CONMEBOL Convention Centre in Luque, Paraguay.

13 August First leg	Grêmio (Brazil)	2–1	(Brazil) Fluminense	Curitiba, Brazil
19:00 UTC−3	Reinaldo 74' (pen.) 77'		Lima 58'	Stadium: Estádio Couto Pereira; Attendance: 18,645; Referee: Darío Herrera (Argentina)

20 August Second leg	Fluminense (Brazil)	2–1 (3–3 agg.) (4–2 p)	(Brazil) Grêmio	Rio de Janeiro, Brazil
19:00 UTC−3	Thiago Silva 14'; Arias 28' (pen.)	Report	Gustavo Nunes 76'	Stadium: Maracanã; Attendance: 46,757; Referee: Andrés Matonte (Uruguay)
	Penalties
	Ganso (penalty missed); Thiago Silva (penalty scored); John Kennedy (penalty scored); Lima (penalty scored); Arias (penalty scored)		Reinaldo (penalty scored); Nathan (penalty missed); Monsalve (penalty scored); Cristaldo (penalty missed)

=== Campeonato Brasileiro Série A ===
==== League table ====
Pos	Team	Pld	W	D	L	GF	GA	GD	Pts	Qualification or relegation
12	Atlético Mineiro	38	11	14	13	47	54	−7	47	Qualification for Copa Sudamericana group stage
13	Fluminense	38	12	10	16	33	39	−6	46	Qualification for Copa Sudamericana group stage
14	Grêmio	38	12	9	17	44	50	−6	45	Qualification for Copa Sudamericana group stage
15	Juventude	38	11	12	15	48	59	−11	45	
16	Red Bull Bragantino	38	10	14	14	44	48	−4	44	

Source: CBF
Rules for classification: 1) points; 2) wins; 3) goal difference; 4) goals scored; 5) head-to-head results (only between two teams); 6) fewest red cards; 7) fewest yellow cards; 8) drawing of lots.

==== Results summary ====
Overall								Home						Away					
Pld	W	D	L	GF	GA	GD	Pts	W	D	L	GF	GA	GD	W	D	L	GF	GA	GD
38	12	9	17	44	50	−6	45	9	2	8	26	26	0	3	7	9	18	24	−6

Source: Soccerway

==== Results by matchday ====
Matchday	1	2	3	4	5	6	7	8	9	10	11	12	13	14	15	16	17	18	19	20	21	22	23	24	25	26	27	28	29	30	31	32	33	34	35	36	37	38
Ground	A	H	H	A	H	A	H	A	H	A	H	A	H	H	A	H	A	H	A	H	A	A	H	A	H	A	H	A	H	A	H	A	A	H	A	H	A	H
Result	L	W	W	L	L	L	L	L	L	L	L	D	W	D	L	L	L	W	D	W	W	W	L	W	L	D	W	D	W	L	W	D	L	D	D	W	W	L
Position	15	8	5	9	14	11	12	13	17	19	19	19	18	18	18	18	18	18	17	16	14	13	15	13	15	14	12	13	11	12	11	11	12	13	14	11	12	14

Source: Confederação Brasileira de Futebol
A = Away; H = Home; W = Win; D = Draw; L = Loss; P = Postponed

==== Matches ====
The league fixtures were announced on 29 February 2024.

14 April 1	Vasco	2–1	Grêmio	Rio de Janeiro
16:00 UTC−3	David 24'; Mateus Carvalho 37'	Report	Gustavo Martins 68'	Stadium: Estádio São Januário; Attendance: 18,055; Referee: Flávio Rodrigues de Souza

17 April 2	Grêmio	2–0	Athletico Paranaense	Porto Alegre
19:00 UTC−3	Cristaldo 19'; Soteldo 51'	Report		Stadium: Arena do Grêmio; Attendance: 13,541; Referee: Marcelo de Lima Henrique

20 April 3	Grêmio	1–0	Cuiabá	Porto Alegre
18:30 UTC−3	Cristaldo 44'	Report		Stadium: Arena do Grêmio; Attendance: 22,904; Referee: Bruno Pereira Vasconcelos

27 April 4	Bahia	1–0	Grêmio	Salvador
21:00 UTC−3	Everaldo 17'	Report		Stadium: Arena Fonte Nova; Attendance: 35,836; Referee: Bráulio da Silva Machado

1 June 7	Grêmio	0–2	Red Bull Bragantino	Curitiba
16:00 UTC−3		Report	Eric Ramires 3'; Luan Cândido 60' (pen.)	Stadium: Estádio Couto Pereira; Attendance: 7,563; Referee: Ramon Abatti Abel

13 June 8	Flamengo	2–1	Grêmio	Rio de Janeiro
20:00 UTC−3	Luiz Araújo 42', 67'	Report	Edenilson 90+6'	Stadium: Maracanã; Attendance: 51,785; Referee: Luiz Flávio de Oliveira

16 June 9	Grêmio	1–2	Botafogo	Cariacica
18:30 UTC−3	Gustavo Nunes 21'	Report	Cuiabano 10'; Júnior Santos 57'	Stadium: Estádio Kléber Andrade; Attendance: 15,595; Referee: Paulo César Zanovelli da Silva

19 June 10	Fortaleza	1–0	Grêmio	Fortaleza
20:00 UTC−3	Lucero 42' (pen.)	Report		Stadium: Arena Castelão; Attendance: 16,935; Referee: João Vitor Gobi

22 June 11	Grêmio	0–1	Internacional	Curitiba
17:30 UTC−3		Report	Gustavo Martins 64' (o.g.)	Stadium: Estádio Couto Pereira; Attendance: 27,961; Referee: Ramon Abatti Abel

26 June 12	Atlético Goianiense	1–1	Grêmio	Goiânia
20:00 UTC−3	Luiz Felipe 72'	Report	Reinaldo 82'	Stadium: Estádio Antônio Accioly; Attendance: 8,838; Referee: Bruno Arleu de Araújo

30 June 13	Grêmio	1–0	Fluminense	Caxias do Sul
16:00 UTC−3	Gustavo Nunes 61'	Report		Stadium: Estádio Centenário; Attendance: 8,639; Referee: Paulo César Zanovelli da Silva

4 July 14	Grêmio	2–2	Palmeiras	Caxias do Sul
19:00 UTC−3	Pavon 2'; Cristaldo 70' (pen.)	Report	López 74'; Estêvão 77'	Stadium: Estádio Centenário; Attendance: 15,689; Referee: Marcelo de Lima Henrique

7 July 15	Juventude	3–0	Grêmio	Caxias do Sul
16:00 UTC−3	Gilberto 25'; João Lucas 32'; Erick Farias 83'	Report		Stadium: Estádio Alfredo Jaconi; Attendance: 7,984; Referee: Matheus Delgado Candançan

10 July 16	Grêmio	0–2	Cruzeiro	Caxias do Sul
18:30 UTC−3		Report	Ramiro 15'; Arthur Gomes 17'	Stadium: Estádio Centenário; Attendance: 4,713; Referee: Bruno Arleu de Araújo

17 July 17	São Paulo	1–0	Grêmio	São Paulo
20:00 UTC−3	Lucas Moura 10'	Report		Stadium: Morumbi; Attendance: 53,168; Referee: Gustavo Ervino Bauermann

21 July 18	Grêmio	2–0	Vitória	Caxias do Sul
11:00 UTC−3	Soteldo 63'; Reinaldo 90+6' (pen.)	Report		Stadium: Estádio Centenário; Attendance: 14,365; Referee: Sávio Pereira Sampaio

25 July 19	Corinthians	2–2	Grêmio	São Paulo
20:00 UTC−3	Yuri Alberto 25' (pen.); Garro 87'	Report	Rodrigo Ely 2'; Villasanti 76'	Stadium: Neo Química Arena; Attendance: 45,481; Referee: Alex Gomes Stefano

28 July 20	Grêmio	1–0	Vasco	Chapecó
19:00 UTC−3	Soteldo 57'	Report		Stadium: Arena Condá; Attendance: 17,621; Referee: Paulo César Zanovelli da Silva

4 August 21	Athletico Paranaense	0–2	Grêmio	Curitiba
16:00 UTC−3		Report	Gustavo Martins 18'; Monsalve 21'	Stadium: Ligga Arena; Attendance: 27,205; Referee: Matheus Delgado Candançan

10 August 22	Cuiabá	1–3	Grêmio	Cuiabá
19:00 UTC−3	Braithwaite 52' (o.g.)	Report	Gustavo Nunes 23'; Braithwaite 64', 86'	Stadium: Arena Pantanal; Attendance: 9,853; Referee: Bruno Pereira Vasconcelos

17 August 23	Grêmio	0–2	Bahia	Caxias do Sul
18:30 UTC−3		Report	Thaciano 45', 76'	Stadium: Estádio Alfredo Jaconi; Attendance: 17,102; Referee: Matheus Delgado Candançan

25 August 24	Criciúma	0–1	Grêmio	Criciúma
16:00 UTC−3		Report	Monsalve 86'	Stadium: Estádio Heriberto Hülse; Attendance: 17,377; Referee: Lucas Paulo Torezin

1 September 25	Grêmio	2–3	Atlético Mineiro	Porto Alegre
11:00 UTC−3	Braithwaite 32'; Cristaldo 41'	Report	Scarpa 73' (pen.); Palacios 90+5' (pen.); Vargas 90+6'	Stadium: Arena do Grêmio; Attendance: 39,337; Referee: Raphael Claus

15 September 26	Red Bull Bragantino	2–2	Grêmio	Bragança Paulista
16:00 UTC−3	Sasha 44' (pen.); Vinicius Pereira 63'	Report	Monsalve 28'; Jemerson 53'	Stadium: Estádio Nabi Abi Chedid; Attendance: 5,228; Referee: Bruno Arleu de Araújo

22 September 27	Grêmio	3–2	Flamengo	Porto Alegre
18:30 UTC−3	Cristaldo 12'; Braithwaite 55'; Diego Costa 85'	Report	Matheus Gonçalves 25'; Felipe Teresa 90'	Stadium: Arena do Grêmio; Attendance: 18,049; Referee: Matheus Delgado Candançan

25 September 5	Grêmio	1–2	Criciúma	Porto Alegre
19:00 UTC−3	Villasanti 67'	Report	Arthur Caíke 14'; Ronald 78'	Stadium: Arena do Grêmio; Attendance: 13,582; Referee: Davi de Oliveira Lacerda

28 September 28	Botafogo	0–0	Grêmio	Brasília
21:00 UTC−3		Report		Stadium: Estádio Nacional Mané Garrincha; Attendance: 30,312; Referee: Maguielson Lima Barbosa

4 October 29	Grêmio	3–1	Fortaleza	Porto Alegre
21:30 UTC−3	Aravena 13'; Braithwaite 60'; Soteldo 90+1'	Report	Hércules 18'	Stadium: Arena do Grêmio; Attendance: 22,204; Referee: Davi de Oliveira Lacerda

9 October 6	Atlético Mineiro	2–1	Grêmio	Belo Horizonte
19:30 UTC−3	Hulk 11' (pen.); Deyverson 39'	Report	Aravena 24'	Stadium: Arena MRV; Attendance: 22,053; Referee: Luiz Flávio de Oliveira

19 October 30	Internacional	1–0	Grêmio	Porto Alegre
16:00 UTC−3	Borré 67'	Report		Stadium: Estádio Beira-Rio; Attendance: 48,049; Referee: Bruno Arleu de Araújo

26 October 31	Grêmio	3–1	Atlético Goianiense	Porto Alegre
16:30 UTC−3	Soteldo 40'; Pepê 59'; Villasanti 83'	Report	Derek 28'	Stadium: Arena do Grêmio; Attendance: 36,959; Referee: Edina Alves Batista

1 November 32	Fluminense	2–2	Grêmio	Rio de Janeiro
21:00 UTC−3	Arias 43'; Kauã Elias 66'	Report	Braithwaite 26'; Reinaldo 90+9' (pen.)	Stadium: Maracanã; Attendance: 35,278; Referee: Matheus Delgado Candançan

8 November 33	Palmeiras	1–0	Grêmio	São Paulo
21:30 UTC−3	Estêvão 73'	Report		Stadium: Allianz Parque; Attendance: 33,670; Referee: Marcelo de Lima Henrique

20 November 34	Grêmio	2–2	Juventude	Porto Alegre
19:00 UTC−3	Braithwaite 3'; João Lucas 90+4' (o.g.)	Report	Mandaca 45+6'; Lucas Barbosa 52'	Stadium: Arena do Grêmio; Attendance: 40,426; Referee: Bruno Arleu de Araújo

27 November 35	Cruzeiro	1–1	Grêmio	Belo Horizonte
21:00 UTC−3	Matheus Pereira 42'	Report	Braithwaite 19'	Stadium: Mineirão; Attendance: 21,009; Referee: Raphael Claus

1 December 36	Grêmio	2–1	São Paulo	Porto Alegre
16:00 UTC−3	Cristaldo 36'; Ruan 45+1' (o.g.)	Report	Luiz Gustavo 64'	Stadium: Arena do Grêmio; Attendance: 39,414; Referee: Ramon Abatti Abel

4 December 37	Vitória	1–1	Grêmio	Salvador
20:00 UTC−3	Alerrandro 67'	Report	João Pedro 37'	Stadium: Barradão; Attendance: 26,842; Referee: Alex Gomes Stefano

8 December 38	Grêmio	0–3	Corinthians	Porto Alegre
16:00 UTC−3		Report	Yuri Alberto 45+1' (pen.); Charles 88'; Memphis 90+3'	Stadium: Arena do Grêmio; Attendance: 42,699; Referee: Paulo César Zanovelli

=== Copa do Brasil ===
==== Third round ====
The draw for the third round was held on 17 April 2024, 14:30 UTC−03:00, at the CBF headquarters in Rio de Janeiro.

30 April First leg	Operário	0–0	Grêmio	Ponta Grossa
20:00 UTC−3		Report		Stadium: Estádio Germano Krüger; Attendance: 6,088; Referee: Jefferson Ferreira de Moraes

14 July Second leg	Grêmio	3–1 (3–1 agg.)	Operário	Caxias do Sul
11:00 UTC−3	Pavon 22' (pen.); Galdino 32'; Gustavo Nunes 54'	Report	Ronaldo 30'	Stadium: Estádio Centenário; Attendance: 7,505; Referee: Ramon Abatti Abel

==== Round of 16 ====
The draw for the round of 16 was held on 18 July 2024, 14:00 UTC−03:00, at the CBF headquarters in Rio de Janeiro.

31 July First leg	Corinthians	0–0	Grêmio	São Paulo
21:30 UTC−3		Report		Stadium: Neo Química Arena; Attendance: 43,315; Referee: Marcelo de Lima Henrique

7 August Second leg	Grêmio	0–0 (0–0 agg.) (1–3 p)	Corinthians	Curitiba
21:30 UTC−3		Report		Stadium: Estádio Couto Pereira; Attendance: 29,409; Referee: Bruno Arleu de Araújo
	Penalties
	Reinaldo (penalty scored); Edenilson (penalty missed); Cristaldo (penalty missed); Pavon (penalty missed)		Romero (penalty scored); André Ramalho (penalty scored); Giovane (penalty scored)
