= João Araújo =

João Araújo may refer to:

- João Araújo (swimmer) (born 1985), Portuguese swimmer
- João Araújo (footballer), Brazilian footballer

== See also ==
- João Paulo (footballer, born June 1988), born João Paulo da Silva Araújo, Brazilian footballer
