= Raul Steffens =

Brazilian footballer

Raul
Personal information
- Full name: Raul Jonas Steffens
- Date of birth: 28 July 1997 (age 29)
- Place of birth: Lagoa dos Três Cantos, Brazil
- Height: 1.91 m (6 ft 3 in)
- Position: Goalkeeper

Team information
- Current team: AVS
- Number: 25

Youth career
- Juventude

Senior career*
Years	Team	Apps	(Gls)
2017–2020	Juventude	5	(0)
2019	→ Cianorte (loan)	0	(0)
2020	→ FC Cascavel (loan)	26	(0)
2021	Aimoré	10	(0)
2021	CSA	1	(0)
2022	Novo Hamburgo	3	(0)
2022	Criciúma	0	(0)
2023	Barra-SC	0	(0)
2023–2024	São Luiz	11	(0)
2024–2026	Botafogo	10	(0)
2026–	AVS	0	(0)
- * Club domestic league appearances and goals as of 19:35, 1 August 2026 (UTC)

Raul Jonas Steffens (born 28 July 1997), known as Raul, is a Brazilian footballer who plays as a goalkeeper for Liga Portugal 2 club AVS.

== Career ==
=== Early career ===
Raul was born in Lagoa dos Três Cantos, Rio Grande do Sul, and was a Juventude youth graduate. He made his first team debut on 9 April 2017, starting in a 1–0 Campeonato Gaúcho away loss to rivals Caxias.

After spending the most of his spell as a backup to Douglas Silva, Matheus Cavichioli and Marcelo Carné, Raul was loaned to Cianorte on 15 April 2019. On 25 September, after making no appearances for the club, he moved to FC Cascavel also in a temporary deal.

A regular starter with Cascavel, Raul signed for Aimoré on 4 January 2021, and was a first-choice during the 2021 Campeonato Gaúcho. On 16 April, he joined Série B side CSA, but was mainly a fourth-choice behind Thiago Rodrigues, Lucas Frigeri and Darley.

On 21 December 2021, Raul was announced at Novo Hamburgo for the upcoming season. Again a backup, he moved to second division club Criciúma on 30 March, but left the club without appearing in any matches and signed for Barra-SC on 1 December.

=== São Luiz ===
On 14 May 2023, Raul was announced at São Luiz. He was an immediate starter for the club, winning the Copa FGF and the Recopa Gaúcha with them.

=== Botafogo ===
On 7 March 2024, Raul signed a contract with Série A side Botafogo until the end of 2025. He spent his first year as a third-choice behind John and Gatito Fernández, only making his club debut on 10 January 2025, in a 2–1 Campeonato Carioca loss to Maricá.

While still a third-choice behind Neto and Léo Linck, Raul renewed his link until March 2027 on 28 October 2025. He only made his top tier debut on 4 December of that year, starting in a 2–2 away draw against Cruzeiro as Neto and Linck were both out injured.

As Neto and Linck recovered, Raul was initially back to the third-choice spot for the 2026 season, but became a starter in March after the other two players were in poor form.

== Career statistics ==
As of 23 March 2026

Club	Season	League			State League		Cup		Continental		Other		Total	
Club	Season	Division	Apps	Goals	Apps	Goals	Apps	Goals	Apps	Goals	Apps	Goals	Apps	Goals
Juventude	2017	Série B	1	0	1	0	0	0	—		—		2	0
Juventude	2018	Série B	0	0	0	0	0	0	—		6 (Note: Appearance(s) in Copa FGF)	0	6	0
Juventude	2019	Série B	0	0	3	0	0	0	—		—		3	0
Juventude	Total		1	0	4	0	0	0	—		6	0	11	0
Cianorte (loan)	2019	Série D	0	0	—		—		—		—		0	0
FC Cascavel (loan)	2020	Série D	11	0	15	0	—		—		—		26	0
Aimoré	2021	Série D	0	0	10	0	—		—		—		10	0
CSA	2021	Série B	1	0	0	0	—		—		0	0	1	0
Novo Hamburgo	2022	Gaúcho	—		3	0	—		—		—		3	0
Criciúma	2022	Série B	0	0	0	0	—		—		—		0	0
Barra-SC	2023	Catarinense	—		0	0	—		—		—		0	0
São Luiz	2023	Gaúcho	—		—		—		—		11	0	11	0
São Luiz	2024	Gaúcho	—		11	0	1	0	—		1 (Note: Appearance(s) in Recopa Gaúcha)	0	13	0
São Luiz	Total		—		11	0	1	0	—		12	0	24	0
Botafogo	2024	Série A	0	0	—		—		0	0	—		0	0
Botafogo	2025	Série A	2	0	5	0	1	0	0	0	0	0	8	0
Botafogo	2026	Série A	3	0	5	0	0	0	0	0	—		8	0
Botafogo	Total		5	0	10	0	1	0	0	0	0	0	16	0
Career total			18	0	53	0	2	0	0	0	18	0	91	0

== Honours ==
CSA

- Campeonato Alagoano: 2021

Criciúma

- Campeonato Catarinense Série B: 2022

São Luiz

- Copa FGF: 2023
- Recopa Gaúcha: 2024

Botafogo

- Copa Libertadores: 2024
- Campeonato Brasileiro Série A: 2024
