= Jorge Meurer =

Brazilian footballer

Personal information
- Full name: Jorge Meurer Bartholdy
- Date of birth: 3 April 2001 (age 25)
- Place of birth: Santa Cruz do Sul, Brazil
- Height: 1.95 m (6 ft 5 in)
- Position: Goalkeeper

Team information
- Current team: Java United
- Number: 1

Youth career
- 2017–2019: Avenida
- 2019–2020: Santa Cruz-RS

Senior career*
Years	Team	Apps	(Gls)
2021	Santa Cruz-RS	0	(0)
2021–2023	Avenida	0	(0)
2022	→ São Borja (loan)	1	(0)
2023	Glória	13	(0)
2023	América-TO	0	(0)
2024	Itabuna	8	(0)
2024	Glória	6	(0)
2024–2025	Gaúcho	0	(0)
2025	→ Pelotas (loan)	14	(0)
2025	Grêmio	0	(0)
2026	Ceará	0	(0)
2026–	Java United	2	(0)
- * Club domestic league appearances and goals as of 19 September 2026

Jorge Meurer Bartholdy (born 3 April 2001) is a Brazilian footballer who plays as a goalkeeper for Super League club Java United.

== Career ==
=== Early career ===
Born in Santa Cruz do Sul, Rio Grande do Sul, Jorge represented Avenida and Santa Cruz-RS as a youth. Promoted to the latter's first team in 2021, he failed to make an appearance before returning to his previous club in July of that year.

In 2022, Jorge was loaned to São Borja, making his senior debut on 31 July of that year, in a 3–0 Campeonato Gaúcho Série B home win over Atlético Carazinho. He started the 2023 pre-season back at Avenida, but again failed to make an appearance and signed for Glória, where he became a first-choice.

In August 2023, Jorge was presented in the squad of América-TO, but acted only as a backup. He began the 2024 campaign at Itabuna, before returning to Glória in April.

In August 2024, Jorge signed for Gaúcho for the year's Copa FGF, where he was an undisputed starter before being loaned to Pelotas on 21 November for the 2025 Campeonato Gaúcho. Despite suffering relegation with the latter in the Gauchão, he was a starter in all the club's 14 matches, being a spotlight of the side.

=== Grêmio ===
On 22 March 2025, Jorge was announced at Série A side Grêmio on a two-year contract.

== Career statistics ==
As of 23 March 2025

Club	Season	League			State League		Cup		Continental		Other		Total	
Club	Season	Division	Apps	Goals	Apps	Goals	Apps	Goals	Apps	Goals	Apps	Goals	Apps	Goals
Santa Cruz-RS	2021	Gaúcho Série B	—		0	0	—		—		—		0	0
Avenida	2021	Gaúcho Série A2	—		0	0	—		—		—		0	0
Avenida	2022	Gaúcho Série A2	—		0	0	—		—		—		0	0
Avenida	2023	Gaúcho	—		0	0	—		—		—		0	0
Avenida	Total		—		0	0	—		—		—		0	0
São Borja (loan)	2022	Gaúcho Série B	—		1	0	—		—		—		1	0
Glória	2023	Gaúcho Série A2	—		13	0	—		—		—		13	0
América-TO	2023	Mineiro Segunda Divisão	—		0	0	—		—		—		0	0
Itabuna	2024	Série D	0	0	8	0	1	0	—		—		9	0
Glória	2024	Gaúcho Série A2	—		6	0	—		—		—		6	0
Gaúcho	2024	Gaúcho Série A2	—		—		—		—		12 (Note: Appearance(s) in Copa FGF)	0	12	0
Pelotas	2025	Gaúcho	—		14	0	—		—		—		14	0
Grêmio	2025	Série A	0	0	—		0	0	0	0	—		0	0
Career total			0	0	42	0	1	0	0	0	12	0	55	0

== Honours ==
Santa Cruz-RS

- Campeonato Gaúcho Série B: 2021
