= Kadir Barría =

Panamanian footballer (born 2007)

Personal information
- Full name: José Kadir Barría Rose
- Date of birth: 18 July 2007 (age 19)
- Place of birth: Panama City, Panama
- Height: 1.83 m (6 ft 0 in)
- Position: Forward

Team information
- Current team: Botafogo

Youth career
- Chievo Academy Panamá
- Parma Academy Panamá
- 2024: Atlético Nacional
- 2025–: Botafogo

Senior career*
Years	Team	Apps	(Gls)
2025–	Botafogo	15	(2)

International career^{‡}
2026–	Panama	5	(2)
- * Club domestic league appearances and goals as of 23 May 2026 ‡ National team caps and goals as of 22:22, 3 June 2026 (UTC)

José Kadir Barría Rose (born 18 July 2007) is a Panamanian footballer who plays as a forward for Brazilian club Botafogo and the Panama national team.

== Club career ==
Born in Panama City, Barría played for local sides Chievo Academy Panamá, Parma Academy Panamá and Atlético Nacional before impressing the scouts of Botafogo during a tournament in September 2024. Due to being an under-18 foreign player, he was unable to sign a contract with the latter club, but agreed to a pre-contract and still moved to Rio de Janeiro, where he was only training with the side.

On 4 August 2025, Barría signed a contract with Fogão, being now a member of the under-20 team. He made his first team – and Série A – debut on 24 September, coming on as a late substitute for Artur in a 1–1 away draw against Grêmio; he became the second Panamanian to play in the Brazilian top tier, after Felipe Baloy.

== International career ==
Barría made his senior international debut in a friendly against Bolivia on 18 January 2026. He scored his first international goal in the match, an eventual 1–1 draw.

== Career statistics ==
=== Club ===
As of 23 May 2026

Club	Season	League			State League		Cup		Continental		Other		Total	
Club	Season	Division	Apps	Goals	Apps	Goals	Apps	Goals	Apps	Goals	Apps	Goals	Apps	Goals
Botafogo	2025	Série A	6	2	—		0	0	—		—		6	2
Botafogo	2026	Série A	8	0	1	0	2	0	5 (Note: One appearance in Copa Libertadores, four appearances in Copa Sudamericana)	0	—		16	0
Career total			14	2	1	0	2	0	5	0	0	0	22	2

=== International ===
As of match played 3 June 2026

Appearances and goals by national team and year
National team	Year	Apps	Goals
Panama	2026	5	2
Total		5	2

Scores and results list Panama's goal tally first, score column indicates score after each Barría goal.

List of international goals scored by Kadir Barría
No.	Date	Venue	Opponent	Score	Result	Competition
1	18 January 2026	Estadio IV Centenario, Tarija, Bolivia	Bolivia	1–0	1–1	Friendly
2	3 June 2026	Estadio Rommel Fernández, Ciudad de Panama Panama	Dominican Republic	4–2	4–2	Friendly
