= Enzo Santos =

Brazilian footballer

Enzo
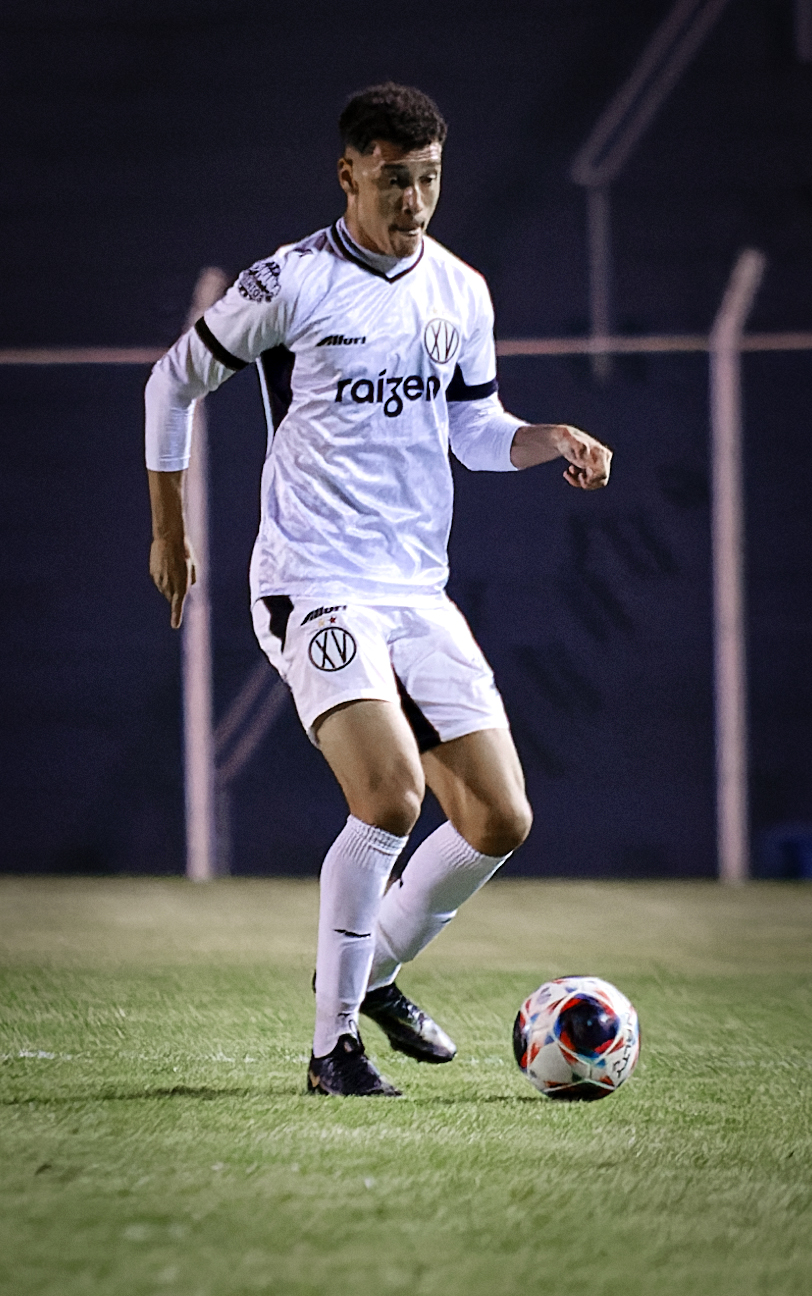
- Enzo playing for XV de Piracicaba in 2023

Personal information
- Full name: Enzo Henrique dos Santos
- Date of birth: 18 July 2002 (age 24)
- Place of birth: Santos, Brazil
- Height: 1.80 m (5 ft 11 in)
- Position: Left-back

Team information
- Current team: Athletic (MG) (on loan from CSA)

Youth career
- 2020–2022: XV de Piracicaba

Senior career*
Years	Team	Apps	(Gls)
2022–2023	XV de Piracicaba	30	(0)
2024	Santo André	19	(0)
2024	→ Mirassol (loan)	0	(0)
2025–	CSA	25	(3)
2025	→ Grêmio (loan)	0	(0)
2026–	→ Athletic (MG) (loan)	29	(1)
- * Club domestic league appearances and goals as of 18 November 2026

Enzo Henrique dos Santos (born 18 July 2002), known as Enzo Santos or just Enzo, is a Brazilian footballer who plays for Athletic (MG), on loan from CSA. Mainly a left-back, he can also play as a midfielder.

== Career ==
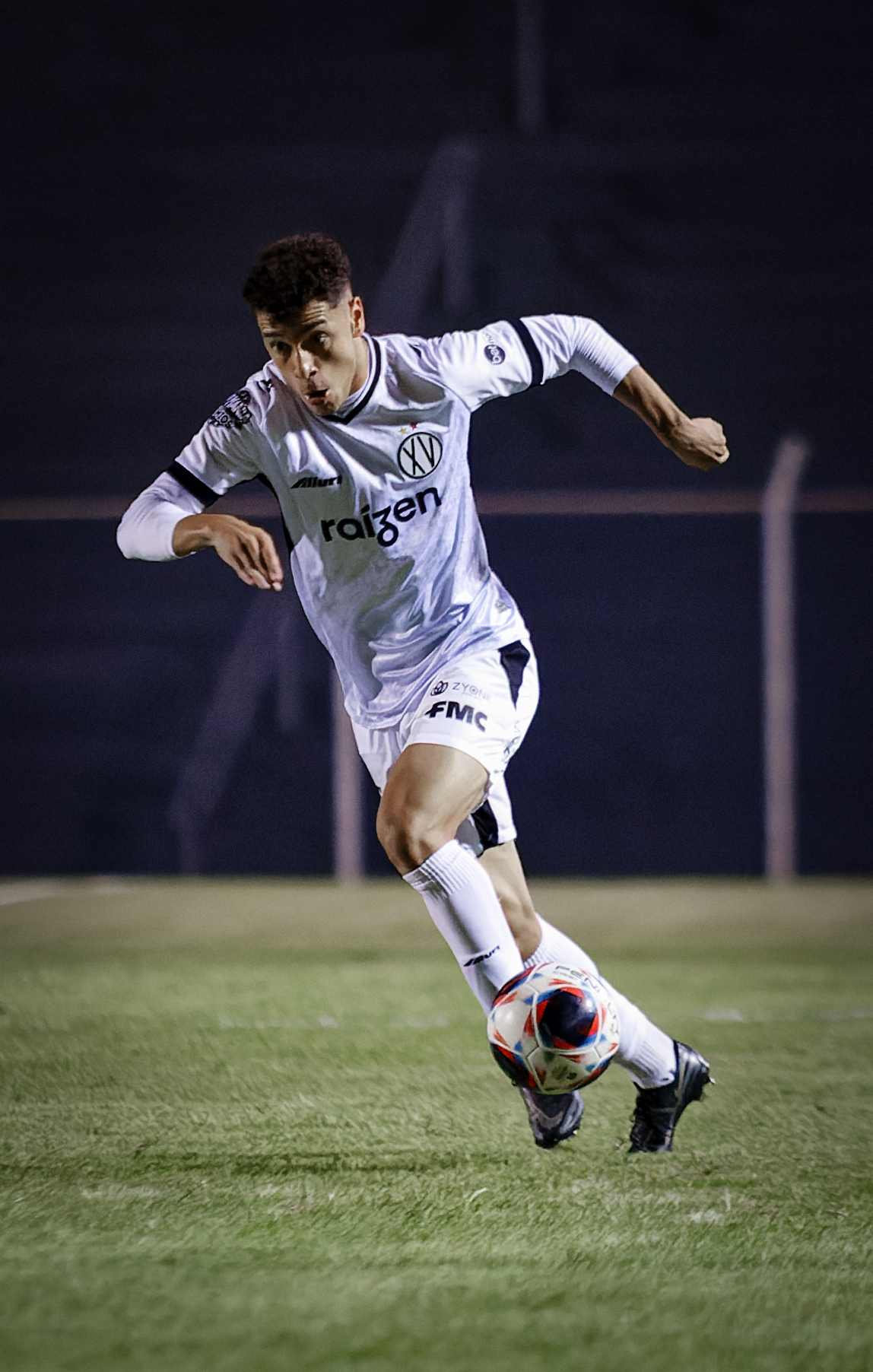
Enzo with XV de Piracicaba in 2023

Born in Santos, São Paulo, Enzo joined XV de Piracicaba's youth sides in 2020, as a midfielder, already for the under-20 team. In June 2022, he was promoted to the first team ahead of the year's Copa Paulista, and was a first-choice as the club lifted the trophy.

Enzo remained a starter during the 2023 season, now already converted into a left-back. In January 2024, he signed a two-year deal with Santo André.

On 4 December 2024, after a period on loan at Mirassol's under-23 team for the Campeonato Brasileiro de Aspirantes, Enzo was announced at CSA. He quickly established himself as a first-choice, and despite suffering relegation, he was loaned to Série A side Grêmio on 2 September 2025.

== Career statistics ==
As of 19 September 2025

Club	Season	League			State League		Cup		Continental		Other		Total	
Club	Season	Division	Apps	Goals	Apps	Goals	Apps	Goals	Apps	Goals	Apps	Goals	Apps	Goals
XV de Piracicaba	2022	Paulista A2	—		—		—		—		16 (Note: Appearance(s) in Copa Paulista)	1	16	1
XV de Piracicaba	2023	Série D	13	0	17	0	—		—		9	0	39	0
XV de Piracicaba	Total		13	0	17	0	—		—		25	1	55	1
Santo André	2024	Série D	14	0	5	0	—		—		—		19	0
Mirassol (loan)	2024	Série B	0	0	—		—		—		—		0	0
CSA	2025	Série C	17	3	8	0	6	0	—		12 (Note: Eleven appearances and one goal in Copa do Nordeste, one appearance in Copa Alagoas)	1	43	4
Grêmio (loan)	2025	Série A	0	0	—		—		—		—		0	0
Career total			0	0	42	0	1	0	0	0	12	0	55	0

== Honours ==
XV de Piracicaba

- Copa Paulista: 2022
