= Lucas Emanuel =

Brazilian footballer (born 2009)

Personal information
- Full name: Lucas Emanuel Jales do Nascimento
- Date of birth: 3 June 2009 (age 17)
- Place of birth: Assú, Brazil
- Height: 1.85 m (6 ft 1 in)
- Position: Forward

Team information
- Current team: Botafogo
- Number: 79

Youth career
- 2020: VF4
- 2021–2022: Grêmio
- 2022–2023: São Paulo
- 2024–2025: Athletico Paranaense
- 2025–: Botafogo

Senior career*
Years	Team	Apps	(Gls)
2026–	Botafogo	1	(1)
- * Club domestic league appearances and goals as of 12:53, 17 July 2026 (UTC)

Lucas Emanuel Jales do Nascimento (born 3 June 2009), known as Lucas Emanuel, is a Brazilian footballer who plays as a forward for Botafogo.

== Career ==
Born in Assú, Rio Grande do Norte, Lucas Emanuel began his career with VF4 at the age of 11. He subsequently represented Grêmio, São Paulo and Athletico Paranaense before signing a three-year contract with Botafogo on 20 June 2025.

Lucas Emanuel was called up to train with the main squad of Fogão during the 2026 FIFA World Cup break, and renewed his link until 2030 on 14 July 2026. He made his professional – and Série A – debut two days later, starting and scoring the opener in a 2–1 home win over Santos; aged 17 years and 43 days, he became the youngest player to score for the club in this century, also being the first player from 2009 to score in the competition.

== Career statistics ==
As of 17 July 2026

Club	Season	League			Cup		Continental		Other		Total	
Club	Season	Division	Apps	Goals	Apps	Goals	Apps	Goals	Apps	Goals	Apps	Goals
Botafogo	2026	Série A	1	1	—		0	0	—		1	1
Career total			1	1	0	0	0	0	0	0	1	1
