= Mayk =

Brazilian footballer (born 1999)

Personal information
- Full name: Mayksilvan da Silva Ferreira
- Date of birth: 31 August 1999 (age 27)
- Place of birth: Santo Antônio, Brazil
- Height: 1.72 m (5 ft 8 in)
- Position: Left-back

Team information
- Current team: Remo
- Number: 98

Youth career
- América de Natal
- 2018–2019: → Bahia (loan)

Senior career*
Years	Team	Apps	(Gls)
2017–2019	América de Natal	12	(0)
2018–2019	→ Bahia (loan)	2	(0)
2019–2022	Bahia	12	(0)
2020	→ Joinville (loan)	5	(0)
2022	→ Retrô (loan)	17	(0)
2022	Retrô	9	(1)
2022–2024	Guarani	52	(1)
2024–2026	Grêmio	13	(0)
2025–2026	→ Novorizontino (loan)	32	(1)
2026–	Remo	2	(0)
- * Club domestic league appearances and goals as of 9 April 2026

Mayksilvan da Silva Ferreira (born 31 August 1999), commonly known as Mayk, is a Brazilian professional footballer who plays as a left-back for Remo

== Career ==
=== América de Natal ===
Born in Santo Antônio, Rio Grande do Norte, Mayk began his career with América de Natal. He made his first team debut at the age of 17 on 22 March 2017, starting in a 1–0 away win over Botafogo-PB, for the year's Copa do Nordeste.

=== Bahia ===
In June 2018, after featuring sparingly, Mayk was loaned to Bahia and returned to the youth setup. On 24 July 2019, he signed a permanent contract with the club until the end of 2022.

On 17 June 2020, Mayk was loaned to Joinville until the end of the season. He left on 11 December after being rarely used, and returned to his parent club, where he was also a backup option.

=== Retrô ===
On 28 December 2021, Mayk moved to Retrô on loan. The following 24 May, after being a first-choice, he terminated his contract with Bahia, and signed a permanent deal with Retrô afterwards.

Mayk scored his first senior goal on 29 May 2022, netting Retrô's fourth in a 4–1 Série D away routing of São Paulo Crystal.

=== Guarani ===
On 27 September 2022, Mayk was announced at Série B side Guarani. Initially a backup option, he became a regular starter in the 2023 season, and renewed his contract until 2024 on 28 September of that year.

Mayk scored his first goal for Bugre on 28 January 2024, netting his team's second in a 3–0 away win over Ituano.

=== Grêmio ===
On 15 February 2024, Mayk was announced at Série A side Grêmio, after agreeing to a contract until the end of 2026. A backup to Reinaldo, he fell further down the pecking order in the 2025 season, after the arrivals of Marlon and Luan Cândido, and was loaned to Novorizontino in the second division in June of that year.

== Career statistics ==
As of 26 March 2026

Club	Season	League			State League		Cup		Continental		Other		Total	
Club	Season	Division	Apps	Goals	Apps	Goals	Apps	Goals	Apps	Goals	Apps	Goals	Apps	Goals
América de Natal	2017	Série D	1	0	3	0	—		—		1 (Note: Appearance(s) in Copa do Nordeste)	0	5	0
América de Natal	2018	Série D	2	0	6	0	0	0	—		—		8	0
América de Natal	Subtotal		3	0	9	0	0	0	—		1	0	13	0
Bahia	2019	Série A	0	0	2	0	0	0	—		0	0	2	0
Bahia	2020	Série A	0	0	7	0	0	0	—		0	0	7	0
Bahia	2021	Série A	0	0	5	0	0	0	0	0	1	0	6	0
Bahia	Subtotal		0	0	14	0	0	0	0	0	1	0	15	0
Joinville (loan)	2020	Série D	3	0	2	0	—		—		—		5	0
Retrô	2022	Série D	15	1	11	0	—		—		—		26	1
Guarani	2022	Série B	7	0	—		—		—		—		7	0
Guarani	2023	Série B	36	0	4	0	—		—		—		40	0
Guarani	2024	Série B	0	0	5	1	—		—		—		5	1
Guarani	Subtotal		43	0	9	1	—		—		—		52	1
Grêmio	2024	Série A	6	0	5	0	1	0	1 (Note: Appearance(s) in Copa Libertadores)	0	3 (Note: One appearance in Recopa Gaúcha, two appearances in Copa FGF)	0	16	0
Grêmio	2025	Série A	0	0	2	0	0	0	0	0	0	0	2	0
Grêmio	Subtotal		6	0	7	0	1	0	1	0	3	0	18	0
Novorizontino (loan)	2025	Série B	21	0	—		—		—		—		21	0
Novorizontino (loan)	2026	Série B	0	0	11	1	1	0	—		—		12	1
Novorizontino (loan)	Subtotal		21	0	11	1	1	0	—		—		33	1
Career total			91	1	63	2	2	0	1	0	5	0	162	3

== Honours ==
Grêmio

- Campeonato Gaúcho: 2024

Individual

- Campeonato Paulista Team of the Year: 2026
