= Huguinho (footballer, born 2007) =

Brazilian footballer (born 2007)

Personal information
- Full name: Victor Hugo Custódio de Melo Moura
- Date of birth: 4 June 2007 (age 19)
- Place of birth: Rio de Janeiro, Brazil
- Height: 1.70 m (5 ft 7 in)
- Position: Midfielder

Team information
- Current team: Botafogo
- Number: 75

Youth career
- 2022–2026: Botafogo

Senior career*
Years	Team	Apps	(Gls)
2025–	Botafogo	8	(1)
2025–2026	→ RWDM Brussels (loan)	18	(1)
- * Club domestic league appearances and goals as of 03:56, 25 July 2026 (UTC)

Victor Hugo Custódio de Melo Moura (born 4 June 2007), commonly known as Huguinho, is a Brazilian footballer who plays as a midfielder for Botafogo.

== Club career ==
Born in Rio de Janeiro, Huguinho joined Botafogo's youth sides in 2022, aged 15. On 10 July 2023, he signed his first professional contract with the club, agreeing to a three-year deal.

Huguinho made his senior debut on 22 January 2025, coming on as a late substitute in a 2–1 Campeonato Carioca home loss to Volta Redonda, as the club fielded mainly reserve and youth players; aged 17 years, he became the fifth-youngest player to debut for the club. On 7 April, he renewed his link with the club until June 2029.

Huguinho subsequently returned to the under-20 squad, before making his Série A debut on 9 August 2025, replacing Danilo in a 5–0 away routing of Fortaleza. On 1 September, he was loaned to RWDM Brussels in Belgium until the following June.

Recalled by Fogão on 2 March 2026, Huguinho renewed his contract until 2030 eleven days later.

== International career ==
In March 2026, Huguinho was called up to the Brazil national under-20 team.

== Career statistics ==
As of 25 July 2026

Club	Season	League			State League		Cup		Continental		Other		Total	
Club	Season	Division	Apps	Goals	Apps	Goals	Apps	Goals	Apps	Goals	Apps	Goals	Apps	Goals
Botafogo	2025	Série A	1	0	2	0	1	0	0	0	0	0	4	0
Botafogo	2026	Série A	5	1	—		0	0	1 (Note: Appearance(s) in Copa Sudamericana)	0	—		6	1
Botafogo	Total		6	1	2	0	1	0	1	0	0	0	10	1
RWDM Brussels (loan)	2025–26	Challenger Pro League	18	1	—		1	0	—		—		19	1
Career total			24	2	2	0	2	0	1	0	0	0	29	2
