= Gabriel Justino (footballer, born 2006) =

Brazilian footballer (born 2006)

Personal information
- Full name: Gabriel Pereira Justino
- Date of birth: 16 April 2006 (age 20)
- Place of birth: Rio de Janeiro, Brazil
- Height: 1.84 m (6 ft 0 in)
- Positions: Centre-back; defensive midfielder

Team information
- Current team: Botafogo
- Number: 34

Youth career
- 2018–: Botafogo

Senior career*
Years	Team	Apps	(Gls)
2026–	Botafogo	8	(1)
- * Club domestic league appearances and goals as of 15:11, 23 March 2026 (UTC)

Gabriel Pereira Justino (born 16 April 2006) is a Brazilian footballer who plays as either a centre-back or a defensive midfielder for Botafogo.

== Career ==
Born in Rio de Janeiro, Justino joined Botafogo's youth setup in 2018, aged 12. On 10 July 2023, he signed his first professional contract with the club, agreeing to a three-year deal.

Justino made his senior debut on 15 January 2026, starting in a 2–0 Campeonato Carioca away win over Portuguesa-RJ as the club mainly fielded youth players. He subsequently started to feature regularly with the main squad, and scored his first goal on 21 February, netting the opener in a 2–0 win at Boavista.

== Career statistics ==
As of 23 March 2026

Club	Season	League			State league		Cup		Continental		Other		Total	
Club	Season	Division	Apps	Goals	Apps	Goals	Apps	Goals	Apps	Goals	Apps	Goals	Apps	Goals
Botafogo	2026	Série A	2	0	6	1	0	0	1 (Note: Appearance(s) in Copa Libertadores)	0	—		9	1
Career total			2	0	6	1	0	0	1	0	0	0	9	1
