= Lucas Villalba (footballer, born 2001) =

Uruguayan footballer (born 2001)

Personal information
- Full name: Lucas Martín Villalba Jaume
- Date of birth: 11 May 2001 (age 25)
- Place of birth: Montevideo, Uruguay
- Height: 1.82 m (6 ft 0 in)
- Position: Winger

Team information
- Current team: Botafogo
- Number: 77

Youth career
- Boston River

Senior career*
Years	Team	Apps	(Gls)
2022–2023	Tacuarembó	43	(4)
2024	Montevideo City Torque	30	(6)
2025	Nacional	36	(4)
2026–	Botafogo	5	(1)
- * Club domestic league appearances and goals as of 13:16, 6 April 2026 (UTC)

Lucas Martín Villalba Jaume (born 11 May 2001) is a Uruguayan professional footballer who plays as a right winger for Campeonato Brasileiro Série A club Botafogo.

== Club career ==
Villalba played for Boston River as a youth, but was released before the start of the 2022 season. On 16 May of that year, he was announced at Segunda División Amateur side Tacuarembó, and helped the side to achieve promotion in his first year. During his 18 months at the club, he struggled with unpaid wages and had to sleep in the club's facilities due to the lack of funds.

On 5 February 2024, fellow Segunda División side Montevideo City Torque announced the signing of Villalba. He scored six goals and provided seven assists during the season to help the club return to Primera División.

On 20 January 2025, Villalba signed a three-year contract with Nacional also in the top tier. On 28 May, during a Copa Libertadores match against Atlético Nacional, he was recorded as one of the fastest players in the world at 38.3 kilometres per hour.

On 5 January 2026, Villalba moved abroad for the first time in his career, after agreeing to a four-year deal with Campeonato Brasileiro Série A side Botafogo.

== International career ==
In August 2024, Villalba was called up to the Uruguay local national team for a friendly against Guatemala. In September 2026, he was named in the preliminary squad of the Uruguay national team.

== Career statistics ==
As of 13 January 2026

Appearances and goals by club, season and competition
Club	Season	League			Cup (Note: Includes Copa AUF Uruguay, Copa do Brasil)		Continental		Other		Total	
Club	Season	Division	Apps	Goals	Apps	Goals	Apps	Goals	Apps	Goals	Apps	Goals
Tacuarembó	2022	Segunda División Amateur	16	1	1	0	—		—		17	1
Tacuarembó	2023	Segunda División	27	3	0	0	—		—		27	3
Tacuarembó	Total		43	4	1	0	—		—		44	4
Montevideo City Torque	2024	Segunda División	30	6	6	0	—		—		36	6
Nacional	2025	Liga AUF Uruguaya	36	4	0	0	6 (Note: Appearance(s) in Copa Libertadores)	0	1 (Note: Appearance(s) in Supercopa Uruguaya)	0	43	4
Botafogo	2026	Série A	0	0	0	0	0	0	0	0	0	0
Career total			109	14	7	0	6	0	1	0	123	14
