= André Henrique =

Brazilian footballer

Personal information
- Full name: André Henrique da Silva Martins
- Date of birth: 17 December 2001 (age 24)
- Place of birth: Guanambi, Brazil
- Height: 1.89 m (6 ft 2 in)
- Positions: Striker; winger

Team information
- Current team: Göztepe
- Number: 7

Youth career
- Capivariano
- 2021: → América Mineiro (loan)

Senior career*
Years	Team	Apps	(Gls)
2020–2022	Capivariano	38	(12)
2022	→ Marcílio Dias (loan)	6	(3)
2023	Hercílio Luz	14	(4)
2023	→ Grêmio (loan)	21	(3)
2024–2026	Grêmio	51	(9)
2026–	Göztepe	7	(3)
- * Club domestic league appearances and goals as of 23:29, 16 October 2026 (UTC)

André Henrique da Silva Martins (born 17 December 2001), known as André Henrique or just André, is a Brazilian professional footballer who plays as a striker or winger for Süper Lig club Göztepe.

== Club career ==
Born in Guanambi, Bahia, André Henrique represented Capivariano as a youth before making his first team debut on 4 March 2020, coming on as a late substitute in a 2–0 Campeonato Paulista Série A3 home win over Paulista. He scored his first goal on 25 September, netting a hat-trick in a 4–1 home routing of Marília.

In 2021, André Henrique was loaned to América Mineiro and was assigned to the under-20 squad. Back to Capi for the 2022 season, he was an undisputed starter, scoring six goals as his side missed out on promotion.

On 7 June 2022, André Henrique was announced at Série D side Marcílio Dias on loan for the remainder of the season. On 8 December, after helping the side to win the Copa Santa Catarina, he moved to Hercílio Luz as the club paid R$ 500,000 for 50% of his economic rights.

On 4 April 2023, André Henrique was loaned to Série A side Grêmio until the end of the year, with a buyout clause.

== Career statistics ==
As of match played 12 October 2026

Appearances and goals by club, season and competition
Club	Season	League			State league (Note: Includes Campeonato Catarinense, Campeonato Gaucho)		National cup (Note: Includes Copa do Brasil)		Continental		Other		Total	
Club	Season	Division	Apps	Goals	Apps	Goals	Apps	Goals	Apps	Goals	Apps	Goals	Apps	Goals
Capivariano	2020	Paulista A3	—		8	3	—		—		—		8	3
Capivariano	2021	Paulista A3	—		13	3	—		—		—		13	3
Capivariano	2022	Paulista A3	—		17	6	—		—		—		17	6
Capivariano	Total		—		38	12	—		—		—		38	12
Marcílio Dias (loan)	2022	Série D	6	3	—		—		—		13 (Note: Appearances in Copa Santa Catarina)	3	19	6
Hercílio Luz	2023	Série D	0	0	14	4	—		—		—		14	4
Grêmio (loan)	2023	Série A	21	3	—		4	0	—		—		25	3
Grêmio	2024	Série A	0	0	11	3	0	0	0	0	1 (Note: Appearance in Recopa Gaúcha)	0	12	3
Grêmio	2025	Série A	25	5	4	1	0	0	6 (Note: Appearance(s) in Copa Sudamericana)	0	1	0	36	6
Grêmio	2026	Série A	5	0	6	0	1	0	1	0	0	0	13	0
Grêmio	Gremio total		51	8	21	4	5	0	7	0	2	0	86	12
Göztepe	2026–27	Süper Lig	7	3	—		0	0	—		—		7	3
Career total			64	14	73	20	5	0	6	0	15	3	163	37

== Honours ==
Marcílio Dias

- Copa Santa Catarina: 2022

Grêmio

- Campeonato Gaúcho: 2024, 2026
- Recopa Gaúcha: 2025
