= Lian (footballer) =

Brazilian footballer (born 2005)

Personal information
- Full name: Lian dos Santos da Silva
- Date of birth: 20 September 2005 (age 21)
- Place of birth: Rio de Janeiro, Brazil
- Height: 1.68 m (5 ft 6 in)
- Position: Forward

Team information
- Current team: Belenenses (on loan from Ponferradina)
- Number: 38

Youth career
- 2022: Matonense
- 2022: Barretos
- 2022–2025: Grêmio

Senior career*
Years	Team	Apps	(Gls)
2023–2025	Grêmio	1	(0)
2025–	Ponferradina	1	(0)
2026	→ Barbadás (loan)	6	(0)
2026–	→ Belenenses (loan)	1	(0)
- * Club domestic league appearances and goals as of 13 September 2026

Lian dos Santos da Silva (born 20 September 2005), simply known as Lian, is a Brazilian professional footballer who plays as a forward for Portuguese Liga 3 club Belenenses on loan from Spanish side Ponferradina.

== Career ==
Born in Rio de Janeiro, Lian joined Grêmio's youth setup in 2022, after representing Barretos and Matonense. On 17 May 2023, he signed his first professional contract with the former club, until the end of 2025.

Lian made his first team – and Série A – debut on 25 June 2023, coming on as a late substitute for João Pedro in a 5–1 home routing of Coritiba.

== Career statistics ==
As of 27 June 2023

Appearances and goals by club, season and competition
Club	Season	League			State League		National Cup		Continental		Other		Total	
Club	Season	Division	Apps	Goals	Apps	Goals	Apps	Goals	Apps	Goals	Apps	Goals	Apps	Goals
Grêmio	2023	Série A	1	0	—		0	0	—		—		1	0
Career total			1	0	0	0	0	0	0	0	0	0	1	0
