= Kauan Toledo =

Brazilian footballer (born 2006)

Personal information
- Full name: Kauan Almeida Toledo
- Date of birth: 15 April 2006 (age 20)
- Place of birth: Sorocaba, Brazil
- Height: 1.77 m (5 ft 10 in)
- Position: Forward

Team information
- Current team: Botafogo
- Number: 59

Youth career
- 2021–2025: Desportivo Brasil
- 2024–2025: → Botafogo (loan)
- 2025–: Botafogo

Senior career*
Years	Team	Apps	(Gls)
2023	Desportivo Brasil	1	(0)
2025–	Botafogo	3	(0)
- * Club domestic league appearances and goals as of 14:02, 9 December 2025 (UTC)

Kauan Almeida Toledo (born 15 April 2006), known as Kauan Toledo, is a Brazilian footballer who plays as a forward for Botafogo.

== Career ==
Born in Sorocaba, São Paulo, Kauan Toledo began his career with Desportivo Brasil. He made his first team debut on 1 April 2023, coming on as a late substitute in a 1–0 Campeonato Paulista Série A3 away loss to União Suzano.

In March 2024, Kauan Toledo joined Botafogo on loan, being initially a member of the under-20 team. He was bought outright on 6 February of the following year, signing a contract until 2028, and made his first team debut nine days later, in a 1–1 Campeonato Carioca away draw against Boavista.

After being back to the under-20s, Kauan Toledo made his Série A debut on 4 December 2025, replacing Vitinho late into a 2–2 away draw against Cruzeiro.

== Career statistics ==
As of 9 December 2025

Club	Season	League			State League		Cup		Continental		Other		Total	
Club	Season	Division	Apps	Goals	Apps	Goals	Apps	Goals	Apps	Goals	Apps	Goals	Apps	Goals
Desportivo Brasil	2023	Paulista A3	—		1	0	—		—		—		1	0
Botafogo	2025	Série A	2	0	1	0	—		—		—		3	0
Career total			2	0	2	0	0	0	0	0	0	0	4	0
