= Lagoa dos Três Cantos =

Municipality in Rio Grande do Sul, Brazil

Coordinates: 28°34′15″S 52°51′28″W

- Municipality
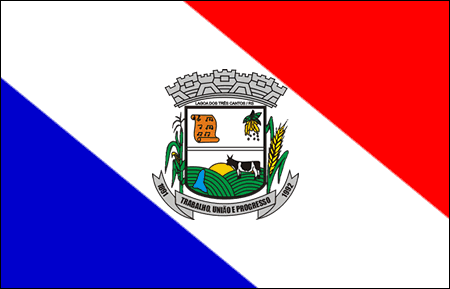
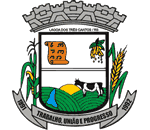
- Flag Coat of arms
- Interactive map of Lagoa dos Três Cantos
- Country: Brazil
- Time zone: UTC−3 (BRT)

Lagoa dos Três Cantos is a municipality in the state of Rio Grande do Sul, Brazil. As of 2020, the estimated population was 1,607.

== Regional language ==
Like in many communities in the state of Rio Grande do Sul, Riograndenser Hunsrückisch has been part of its history since pioneering days.

== See also ==
- List of municipalities in Rio Grande do Sul
