= Jhoan Hernández =

Colombian footballer (born 2006)

Personal information
- Full name: Jhoan Hernández Mejía
- Date of birth: 20 February 2006 (age 20)
- Height: 1.78 m (5 ft 10 in)
- Position: Left-back

Team information
- Current team: Botafogo (on loan from Millonarios)
- Number: 67

Youth career
- Millonarios

Senior career*
Years	Team	Apps	(Gls)
2023–	Millonarios	17	(0)
2026–	→ Botafogo (loan)	2	(0)

International career
2023	Colombia U17	6	(0)
- * Club domestic league appearances and goals as of 8 April 2026

Jhoan Hernández Mejía (born 20 February 2006) is a Colombian professional footballer who plays as a left-back for Brasileiro Série A club Botafogo, on loan from Millonarios.

== Club career ==
Hernández is a product of the Millonarios academy, making his debut for the youth side in 2022. He went on to make his professional debut for the club the following year, going on to play in four games, before signing his first professional contract with the club at the end of the season, in November 2023.

== International career ==
Hernández was called up to the Colombia under-17 squad in 2022 for microcycles. The following year, he played in two friendly matches against Chile, before representing Colombia in their unsuccessful campaign at the 2023 South American U-17 Championship.

== Career statistics ==
=== Club ===
As of 14 February 2024.

Appearances and goals by club, season and competition
Club	Season	League			Cup		Continental		Other		Total	
Club	Season	Division	Apps	Goals	Apps	Goals	Apps	Goals	Apps	Goals	Apps	Goals
Millonarios	2023	Categoría Primera A	4	0	0	0	–		0	0	4	0
Millonarios	2024	Categoría Primera A	0	0	0	0	–		0	0	0	0
Career total			4	0	0	0	0	0	0	0	4	0
