= 2025 Grêmio FBPA season =

Grêmio
2025 season
- President: Alberto Guerra
- Manager: Gustavo Quinteros (until 16 April); Mano Menezes (since 21 April – until 9 December)
- Stadium: Arena do Grêmio
- Campeonato Brasileiro Série A: 9th
- Campeonato Gaúcho: Runners-up
- Copa do Brasil: Third round
- Copa Sudamericana: Knockout round play-offs
- Recopa Gaúcha: Winners
- Top goalscorer: League: Carlos Vinícius (12); All: Martin Braithwaite (15)
- Average home league attendance: 25,584
- Biggest win: 5–0 vs São Luiz (H); 1 February (Campeonato Gaúcho); 5–0 vs Pelotas (H); 11 February (Campeonato Gaúcho)
- Biggest defeat: 0–4 vs Bahia (A); 19 October (Campeonato Brasileiro Série A)
Home colours	Away colours	Third colours

The 2025 season was the Grêmio Foot-Ball Porto Alegrense's 122nd season in existence. In addition to the Campeonato Brasileiro Série A, Grêmio participated in this season's editions of the Copa do Brasil, the Campeonato Gaúcho, the Copa CONMEBOL Sudamericana and the Recopa Gaúcha. The season is the first since 2014 without Pedro Geromel, who retired after the 2024 season.

== Squad information ==
=== First team squad ===
As of 7 December 2025

Note: Flags indicate national team as defined under FIFA eligibility rules; some limited exceptions apply. Players may hold more than one non-FIFA nationality.

No.	Pos.	Nation	Player
1	GK	BRA	Tiago Volpi
2	DF	BRA	João Lucas
3	DF	BRA	Wagner Leonardo
4	DF	ARG	Walter Kannemann (captain)
5	DF	BRA	Rodrigo Ely
6	MF	COL	Gustavo Cuéllar
7	FW	ARG	Cristian Pavon
8	MF	BRA	Edenilson
9	FW	BEL	Francis Amuzu
10	MF	ARG	Franco Cristaldo
11	MF	COL	Miguel Monsalve
12	GK	BRA	Gabriel Grando
13	DF	PAR	Fabián Balbuena
14	DF	BRA	Marcos Rocha
15	MF	BRA	Camilo
16	FW	CHI	Alexander Aravena
17	MF	BRA	Dodi
18	DF	BRA	João Pedro
19	MF	PER	Erick Noriega

No.	Pos.	Nation	Player
20	MF	PAR	Mathías Villasanti (vice-captain)
21	DF	BRA	Jemerson
22	FW	DEN	Martin Braithwaite
23	DF	BRA	Marlon (on loan from Cruzeiro)
24	GK	BRA	Thiago Beltrame
25	DF	BRA	Lucas Esteves
29	MF	BRA	Arthur (3rd captain; on loan from Juventus)
30	DF	BRA	Enzo (on loan from CSA)
31	GK	BRA	Jorge
44	DF	BRA	Viery
47	FW	BRA	Alysson
53	DF	BRA	Gustavo Martins
65	MF	BRA	Riquelme
77	FW	BRA	André Henrique
80	MF	BRA	Alex Santana (on loan from Corinthians)
88	MF	BRA	Willian
95	FW	BRA	Carlos Vinícius
99	FW	URU	Cristian Olivera

=== Reserves squad ===
Note: Flags indicate national team as defined under FIFA eligibility rules; some limited exceptions apply. Players may hold more than one non-FIFA nationality.

No.	Pos.	Nation	Player
37	FW	BRA	Gabriel Mec
39	MF	BRA	Tiago
40	FW	BRA	Jardiel
42	MF	BRA	Smiley
43	DF	BRA	Luis Eduardo

No.	Pos.	Nation	Player
54	DF	BRA	Pedro Gabriel
55	DF	BRA	Nathan Borges
57	MF	BRA	Jeferson
58	MF	BRA	Zortea

== Competitions ==
=== Overview ===
Competition	First match	Last match	Starting round	Final position	Record							
Competition	First match	Last match	Starting round	Final position	Pld	W	D	L	GF	GA	GD	Win %
Campeonato Brasileiro Série A	29 March	7 December	Matchday 1	9th	38	13	10	15	47	50	−3	34.21
Campeonato Gaúcho	22 January	16 March	Group stage	Runners-up	12	6	3	3	23	9	+14	50.00
Copa do Brasil	19 February	20 May	First round	Third round	4	0	3	1	6	7	−1	0.00
Copa CONMEBOL Sudamericana	2 April	23 July	Group stage	Knockout round play-offs	8	3	4	1	9	7	+2	37.50
Recopa Gaúcha	8 July		Final	Winners	1	1	0	0	2	0	+2	100.00
Total					63	23	20	20	87	73	+14	36.51

Last updated: 7 December 2025.
Source: Soccerway

=== Recopa Gaúcha ===
8 July Final	Grêmio	2–0	São José	Porto Alegre
19:30 UTC−3	Alysson 16'; Amuzu 23'	Report		Stadium: Arena do Grêmio; Attendance: 11,806; Referee: Lucas Guimarães Rechatiko Horn

=== Campeonato Gaúcho ===
==== Results summary ====
Overall								Home						Away					
Pld	W	D	L	GF	GA	GD	Pts	W	D	L	GF	GA	GD	W	D	L	GF	GA	GD
8	5	2	1	19	3	+16	17	3	1	0	15	1	+14	2	1	1	4	2	+2

Source: Soccerway

==== Group stage ====
Pos	Team	Pld	W	D	L	GF	GA	GD	Pts	Qualification or relegation
1	Grêmio	8	5	2	1	19	3	+16	17	Knockout stage
2	Guarany de Bagé	8	2	3	3	6	6	0	9	
3	São José	8	0	5	3	5	10	−5	5	Relegation stage
4	Avenida	8	0	3	5	4	9	−5	3	Relegation stage

Source: FGF

===== Results by matchday =====
Matchday	1	2	3	4	5	6	7	8
Ground	A	H	A	H	A	H	H	A
Result	D	W	W	W	L	D	W	W
Position	3	1	1	1	1	1	1	1

Source: Soccerway
A = Away; H = Home; W = Win; D = Draw; L = Loss

===== Matches =====
The group stage fixtures were announced on 10 December 2024.

Note: Match numbers indicated on the left hand side are references to the matchday scheduled by the Campeonato Gaúcho and not the order matches were played after postponements and rescheduled matches.

22 January 1	Brasil (PE)	0–0	Grêmio	Pelotas
22:00 UTC−3		Report		Stadium: Estádio Bento Freitas; Attendance: 6,192; Referee: Lucas Guimarães Rechatiko Horn

26 January 2	Grêmio	4–0	Caxias	Porto Alegre
20:30 UTC−3	Braithwaite 46'; Pavon 70'; Monsalve 81'; Edenilson 90+3'	Report		Stadium: Arena do Grêmio; Attendance: 17,639; Referee: Anderson Daronco

29 January 3	Monsoon	0–3	Grêmio	Novo Hamburgo
22:00 UTC−3	Jeder (red card) 45+6'	Report	Arezo 42', 56'; André 90+2'	Stadium: Estádio do Vale; Attendance: 2,318; Referee: Francisco Soares Dias

1 February 4	Grêmio	5–0	São Luiz	Porto Alegre
16:30 UTC−3	Cristaldo 24', 38'; Aravena 43'; Monsalve 80'; Braithwaite 89'	Report		Stadium: Arena do Grêmio; Attendance: 23,133; Referee: Lucas Guimarães Rechatiko Horn

5 February 5	Juventude	2–0	Grêmio	Caxias do Sul
22:00 UTC−3	Batalla 77'; Jean Carlos 82'	Report		Stadium: Estádio Alfredo Jaconi; Attendance: 10,218; Referee: Jonathan Benkenstein Pinheiro

8 February 6	Grêmio	1–1	Internacional	Porto Alegre
21:00 UTC−3	Braithwaite 70' (pen.)	Report	Fernando 72'	Stadium: Arena do Grêmio; Attendance: 45,364; Referee: Rafael Rodrigo Klein

11 February 7	Grêmio	5–0	Pelotas	Porto Alegre
21:30 UTC−3	Gustavo Martins 38'; Braithwaite 43', 45+1'; Pavon 62', 83'	Report		Stadium: Arena do Grêmio; Attendance: 11,668; Referee: Wagner Silveira Echevarria

15 February 8	Ypiranga	0–1	Grêmio	Erechim
16:30 UTC−3		Report	João Lucas (red card) 28'; Monsalve 62'	Stadium: Estádio Colosso da Lagoa; Attendance: 6,208; Referee: Francisco Soares Dias

==== Semi-finals ====
22 February First leg	Grêmio	2–1	Juventude	Porto Alegre
21:30 UTC−3	Braithwaite 13'; Olivera 52'	Report	Batalla 33'	Stadium: Arena do Grêmio; Attendance: 26,072; Referee: Jonathan Benkenstein Pinheiro

1 March Second leg	Juventude	2–1 (3–3 agg.) (2–3 p)	Grêmio	Caxias do Sul
16:30 UTC−3	Adriano Martins 67'; Mandaca 85'; Reginaldo (red card) 90+17'	Report	Jemerson (red card) 45+1'; Gustavo Martins 90+7'	Stadium: Estádio Alfredo Jaconi; Attendance: 12,821; Referee: Anderson Daronco
	Penalties
	Nenê (penalty missed); Giovanny (penalty scored); Jadson (penalty scored); Alan Ruschel (penalty missed); Ênio (penalty missed)		(penalty scored) Wagner Leonardo; (penalty missed) Pavon; (penalty scored) Arezo; (penalty scored) Volpi; (penalty missed) Villasanti

==== Finals ====
8 March First leg	Grêmio	0–2	Internacional	Porto Alegre
17:45 UTC−3		Report	Carbonero 23'; Alan Patrick 26'	Stadium: Arena do Grêmio; Attendance: 51,077; Referee: Ramon Abatti Abel

16 March Second leg	Internacional	1–1 (3–1 agg.)	Grêmio	Porto Alegre
16:00 UTC−3	Valencia 56'; Aguirre (red card) 90+12'	Report	Wagner Leonardo 62'; Dodi (red card) 90+12'	Stadium: Estádio Beira-Rio; Attendance: 49,295; Referee: Marcelo de Lima Henrique

=== Copa CONMEBOL Sudamericana ===
==== Group stage ====
The draw for the group stage was held on 17 March 2025, 20:00 UTC−03:00, at the CONMEBOL Convention Centre in Luque, Paraguay.

Pos	Team	Pld	W	D	L	GF	GA	GD	Pts	Qualification	GOD	GRE	CAG	SLU
1	(Argentina) Godoy Cruz	6	3	3	0	10	5	+5	12	Advance to round of 16	—	2–2	2–2	2–0
2	(Brazil) Grêmio	6	3	3	0	8	4	+4	12	Advance to knockout round play-offs	1–1	—	2–0	1–0
3	(Peru) Atlético Grau	6	0	4	2	5	9	−4	4		0–2	0–0	—	2–2
4	(Paraguay) Sportivo Luqueño	6	0	2	4	4	9	−5	2		0–1	1–2	1–1	—

Source: CONMEBOL
Rules for classification: 1) Points; 2) Goal difference; 3) Goals scored; 4) Away goals scored; 5) CONMEBOL ranking.

==== Results by matchday ====
Matchday	1	2	3	4	5	6
Ground	A	H	A	A	H	H
Result	W	W	D	D	D	W
Position	2	2	2	2	2	2

Source: CONMEBOL
A = Away; H = Home; W = Win; D = Draw; L = Loss

==== Matches ====
2 April 1	Sportivo Luqueño (Paraguay)	1–2	(Brazil) Grêmio	Asunción, Paraguay
21:30 UTC−3	Santander 29'	Report	Arezo 17' (pen.); Braithwaite 71'	Stadium: Estadio Defensores del Chaco; Attendance: 4,871; Referee: Francisco Gilabert (Chile)

8 April 2	Grêmio (Brazil)	2–0	(Peru) Atlético Grau	Porto Alegre, Brazil
19:00 UTC−3	Arezo 37'; Olivera 67'	Report		Stadium: Arena do Grêmio; Attendance: 12,385; Referee: Gery Vargas (Bolivia)

24 April 3	Godoy Cruz (Argentina)	2–2	(Brazil) Grêmio	Mendoza, Argentina
19:00 UTC−3	Auzmendi 63'; Luca Martínez 86'	Report	Edenilson 34'; Aravena 81'	Stadium: Estadio Malvinas Argentinas; Attendance: 2,963; Referee: Francisco Gilabert (Chile)

7 May 4	Atlético Grau (Peru)	0–0	(Brazil) Grêmio	Lima, Peru
21:30 UTC−3		Report		Stadium: Estadio Alejandro Villanueva; Attendance: 202; Referee: José Burgos (Uruguay)

13 May 5	Grêmio (Brazil)	1–1	(Argentina) Godoy Cruz	Porto Alegre, Brazil
19:00 UTC−3	João Pedro 6'		Andino 29'	Stadium: Arena do Grêmio; Attendance: 15,472; Referee: Diego Ulloa (Colombia)

29 May 6	Grêmio (Brazil)	1–0	(Paraguay) Sportivo Luqueño	Porto Alegre, Brazil
19:00 UTC−3	Riquelme 75'	Report	Vera (red card) 38'; F. Benitez (red card) 85'	Stadium: Arena do Grêmio; Attendance: 5,462; Referee: José Cabero (Chile)

==== Knockout round play-offs ====
16 July First leg	Alianza Lima (Peru)	2–0	(Brazil) Grêmio	Lima, Peru
21:30 UTC−3	Gentile 58'; Castillo 61'	Report		Stadium: Estadio Alejandro Villanueva; Attendance: 23,320; Referee: Wilmar Roldán (Colombia)

23 July Second leg	Grêmio (Brazil)	1–1 (1–3 agg.)	(Peru) Alianza Lima	Porto Alegre, Brazil
21:30 UTC−3	Gustavo Martins 56'	Report	Zambrano (red card) 90+1'; Barcos 90+6'	Stadium: Arena do Grêmio; Attendance: 23,320; Referee: Darío Herrera (Argentina)

=== Campeonato Brasileiro Série A ===
==== League table ====
Pos	Team	Pld	W	D	L	GF	GA	GD	Pts	Qualification or relegation
7	Bahia	38	17	9	12	50	47	+3	60	Qualification for Copa Libertadores second stage
8	São Paulo	38	14	9	15	43	47	−4	51	Qualification for Copa Sudamericana group stage
9	Grêmio	38	13	10	15	47	50	−3	49	Qualification for Copa Sudamericana group stage
10	Red Bull Bragantino	38	14	6	18	45	57	−12	48	Qualification for Copa Sudamericana group stage
11	Atlético Mineiro	38	12	12	14	43	44	−1	48	Qualification for Copa Sudamericana group stage

Source: CBF
Rules for classification: 1) points; 2) wins; 3) goal difference; 4) goals scored; 5) head-to-head results (only between two teams); 6) fewest red cards; 7) fewest yellow cards; 8) drawing of lots.

==== Results summary ====
Overall								Home						Away					
Pld	W	D	L	GF	GA	GD	Pts	W	D	L	GF	GA	GD	W	D	L	GF	GA	GD
38	13	10	15	47	50	−3	49	9	5	5	24	17	+7	4	5	10	23	33	−10

Source: Soccerway

==== Results by matchday ====
Matchday	1	2	3	4	5	6	7	8	9	10	11	12	13	14	15	16	17	18	19	20	21	22	23	24	25	26	27	28	29	30	31	32	33	34	35	36	37	38
Ground	H	A	H	A	H	A	H	H	A	H	A	H	A	H	A	H	A	A	H	A	H	A	H	A	H	A	A	H	A	H	A	H	A	H	A	H	H	A
Result	W	L	L	L	D	D	W	D	L	W	W	D	L	W	D	D	L	L	L	W	D	D	L	W	W	D	L	W	L	W	L	L	D	W	L	W	L	W
Position	5	10	13	17	19	18	13	15	17	12	12	11	12	14	13	11	14	14	15	13	14	13	14	12	10	10	13	11	12	11	11	14	14	12	12	10	11	9

Source: Confederação Brasileira de Futebol
A = Away; H = Home; W = Win; D = Draw; L = Loss; P = Postponed

==== Matches ====
The league fixtures were announced on 12 February 2025.

29 March 1	Grêmio	2–1	Atlético Mineiro	Porto Alegre
18:30 UTC−3	Arezo 33'; Edenilson 45'	Report	Rony 75'	Stadium: Arena do Grêmio; Attendance: 20,111; Referee: Raphael Claus

5 April 2	Ceará	2–0	Grêmio	Fortaleza
18:30 UTC−3	Pedro Raul 26' (pen.); Matheus Araújo 90+5'	Report		Stadium: Arena Castelão; Attendance: 26,777; Referee: Edina Alves Batista

13 April 3	Grêmio	0–2	Flamengo	Porto Alegre
17:30 UTC−3		Report	De Arrascaeta 4', 67'	Stadium: Arena do Grêmio; Attendance: 23,367; Referee: Ramon Abatti Abel

16 April 4	Mirassol	4–1	Grêmio	Mirassol
19:00 UTC−3	Daniel Borges 3', 85'; Reinaldo 21' (pen.), 78'	Report	Braithwaite 82'	Stadium: Estádio José Maria de Campos Maia; Attendance: 4,147; Referee: Lucas Paulo Torezin

19 April 5	Grêmio	1–1	Internacional	Porto Alegre
21:00 UTC−3	Gabriel Grando (red card) 28'; Anthoni 38' (o.g.)	Report	Alan Patrick 66' (pen.)	Stadium: Arena do Grêmio; Attendance: 27,286; Referee: Bráulio da Silva Machado

27 April 6	Vitória	1–1	Grêmio	Salvador
18:30 UTC−3	Carlinhos 66'	Report	Jemerson 20'	Stadium: Barradão; Attendance: 18,688; Referee: Felipe Fernandes de Lima

4 May 7	Grêmio	1–0	Santos	Porto Alegre
16:00 UTC−3	Olivera 77'	Report		Stadium: Arena do Grêmio; Attendance: 27,085; Referee: Bruno Arleu de Araújo

10 May 8	Grêmio	1–1	Red Bull Bragantino	Porto Alegre
18:30 UTC−3	Amuzu 87'	Report	Pitta 89'	Stadium: Arena do Grêmio; Attendance: 15,156; Referee: Davi de Oliveira Lacerda

17 May 9	São Paulo	2–1	Grêmio	São Paulo
21:00 UTC−3	Arboleda 49'; André Silva 85' (pen.)	Report	Aravena 37'	Stadium: Morumbi; Attendance: 34,579; Referee: Rodrigo José Pereira de Lima

25 May 10	Grêmio	1–0	Bahia	Porto Alegre
11:00 UTC−3	Braithwaite 61' (pen.)	Report		Stadium: Arena do Grêmio; Attendance: 14,050; Referee: Bruno Arleu de Araújo

1 June 11	Juventude	0–2	Grêmio	Caxias do Sul
16:00 UTC−3		Report	Braithwaite 13' (pen.); Olivera 38'	Stadium: Estádio Alfredo Jaconi; Attendance: 9,098; Referee: Raphael Claus

12 June 12	Grêmio	1–1	Corinthians	Porto Alegre
20:00 UTC−3	Braithwaite 29'	Report	Breno Bidon 36'	Stadium: Arena do Grêmio; Attendance: 20,465; Referee: Davi de Oliveira Lacerda

13 July 13	Cruzeiro	4–1	Grêmio	Belo Horizonte
20:30 UTC−3	Kaio Jorge 25', 54', 77'; Villalba 33'	Report	André 64'	Stadium: Mineirão; Attendance: 31,668; Referee: Lucas Paulo Torezin

19 July 15	Vasco	1–1	Grêmio	Rio de Janeiro
17:30 UTC−3	Lucas Freitas 64'	Report	Gustavo Martins 80'	Stadium: Estádio São Januário; Attendance: 15,556; Referee: Felipe Fernandes de Lima

26 July 17	Palmeiras	1–0	Grêmio	São Paulo
21:00 UTC−3	Torres 3'	Report		Stadium: Allianz Parque; Attendance: 37,132; Referee: Paulo César Zanovelli da Silva

29 July 14	Grêmio	2–1	Fortaleza	Porto Alegre
20:30 UTC−3	Braithwaite 12' (pen.), 17' (pen.)	Report	Deyverson 24'	Stadium: Arena do Grêmio; Attendance: 18,695; Referee: Alex Gomes Stefano

2 August 18	Fluminense	1–0	Grêmio	Rio de Janeiro
21:00 UTC−3	Everaldo 44'	Report		Stadium: Maracanã; Attendance: 17,015; Referee: Lucas Paulo Torezin

10 August 19	Grêmio	0–1	Sport	Porto Alegre
20:30 UTC−3		Report	Matheusinho 51'	Stadium: Arena do Grêmio; Attendance: 35,087; Referee: Yuri Elino Ferreira da Cruz

17 August 20	Atlético Mineiro	1–3	Grêmio	Belo Horizonte
16:00 UTC−3	Gustavo Scarpa 38'; Cuello (red card) 76'; Alonso (red card) 90+3'	Report	Edenilson 45'; Balbuena 58'; Carlos Vinícius (red card) 65'; Aravena 90'; Dodi (red card) 90+3'	Stadium: Arena MRV; Attendance: 34,774; Referee: Alex Gomes Stefano

23 August 21	Grêmio	0–0	Ceará	Porto Alegre
21:00 UTC−3		Report		Stadium: Arena do Grêmio; Attendance: 25,138; Referee: Davi de Oliveira Lacerda

31 August 22	Flamengo	1–1	Grêmio	Rio de Janeiro
16:00 UTC−3	De Arrascaeta 53'	Report	Volpi 85' (pen.)	Stadium: Maracanã; Attendance: 69,447; Referee: Paulo César Zanovelli da Silva

13 September 23	Grêmio	0–1	Mirassol	Porto Alegre
16:00 UTC−3		Report	Alesson 45'	Stadium: Arena do Grêmio; Attendance: 45,724; Referee: Lucas Casagrande

21 September 24	Internacional	2–3	Grêmio	Porto Alegre
17:30 UTC−3	Alan Patrick 21' (pen.), 45+6' (pen.); Bernabei (red card) 90'	Report	Carlos Vinícius 29'; André 45+8'; Alysson 62'; Arthur (red card) 73'	Stadium: Estádio Beira-Rio; Attendance: 28,176; Referee: Marcelo de Lima Henrique

24 September 16	Grêmio	1–1	Botafogo	Porto Alegre
19:30 UTC−3	Volpi 90' (pen.)	Report	Cuiabano 53'; Kaio Pantaleão (red card) 90+9'	Stadium: Arena do Grêmio; Attendance: 18,551; Referee: Lucas Paulo Torezin

28 September 25	Grêmio	3–1	Vitória	Porto Alegre
11:00 UTC−3	André 45+2'; Amuzu 67'; Aravena 89'	Report	Cantalapiedra 49'	Stadium: Arena do Grêmio; Attendance: 41,025; Referee: Raphael Claus

1 October 26	Santos	1–1	Grêmio	Santos
21:30 UTC−3	Díaz 89'	Report	Edenilson 56'	Stadium: Vila Belmiro; Attendance: 9,306; Referee: Paulo César Zanovelli da Silva

4 October 27	Red Bull Bragantino	1–0	Grêmio	Bragança Paulista
18:30 UTC−3	Jhon Jhon 90+16' (pen.)	Report	Kannemann (red card) 43'	Stadium: Estádio Cícero de Souza Marques; Attendance: 3,861; Referee: Lucas Casagrande

16 October 28	Grêmio	2–0	São Paulo	Porto Alegre
19:00 UTC−3	Carlos Vinícius 39', 56' (pen.)	Report		Stadium: Arena do Grêmio; Attendance: 21,526; Referee: Davi De Oliveira Lacerda

19 October 29	Bahia	4–0	Grêmio	Salvador
20:30 UTC−3	Iago 4'; Willian José 10'; David Duarte 57'; Rodrigo Nestor 90+3'	Report		Stadium: Arena Fonte Nova; Attendance: 29,376; Referee: Raphael Claus

26 October 30	Grêmio	3–1	Juventude	Porto Alegre
16:00 UTC−3	Carlos Vinícius 35' (pen.), 48', 67'	Report	Marcos Paulo (red card) 70'; Igor Formiga 79'	Stadium: Arena do Grêmio; Attendance: 32,444; Referee: Alex Gomes Stefano

2 November 31	Corinthians	2–0	Grêmio	São Paulo
16:00 UTC−3	Gustavo Henrique 16'; Memphis 80' (pen.)	Report		Stadium: Neo Química Arena; Attendance: 42,081; Referee: Davi de Oliveira Lacerda

5 November 32	Grêmio	0–1	Cruzeiro	Porto Alegre
20:00 UTC−3		Report	Fabrício Bruno 43'	Stadium: Arena do Grêmio; Attendance: 20,050; Referee: Lucas Paulo Torezin

9 November 33	Fortaleza	2–2	Grêmio	Fortaleza
20:30 UTC−3	Bareiro 5'; Matheus Pereira 65', (red card) 90+10'	Report	Carlos Vinícius 14'; Marlon 32'	Stadium: Arena Castelão; Attendance: 16,025; Referee: Jefferson Ferreira de Moraes

19 November 34	Grêmio	2–0	Vasco	Porto Alegre
21:30 UTC−3	Carlos Vinícius 51'; Amuzu 84'	Report		Stadium: Arena do Grêmio; Attendance: 33,807; Referee: Raphael Claus

22 November 35	Botafogo	3–2	Grêmio	Rio de Janeiro
19:30 UTC−3	Cuiabano 15'; Artur 19'; Marçal 83'	Report	André 49'; Carlos Vinícius 90'	Stadium: Estádio Nilton Santos; Attendance: 16,755; Referee: Felipe Fernandes de Lima

25 November 36	Grêmio	3–2	Palmeiras	Porto Alegre
21:30 UTC−3	Amuzu 45+3'; Carlos Vinícius 61' (pen.); Willian 85' (pen.)	Report	Torres 23'; Giay (red card) 84'; Benedetti 90+3'	Stadium: Arena do Grêmio; Attendance: 25,898; Referee: Sávio Pereira Sampaio

2 December 37	Grêmio	1–2	Fluminense	Porto Alegre
21:30 UTC−3	André 54'	Report	Soteldo 19', 52'	Stadium: Arena do Grêmio; Attendance: 23,689; Referee: Raphael Claus

7 December 38	Sport	0–4	Grêmio	Recife
16:00 UTC−3		Report	Carlos Vinícius 29', 31'; Gustavo Martins 42'; Cristaldo 48'	Stadium: Ilha do Retiro; Attendance: 3,339; Referee: Edina Alves Batista

=== Copa do Brasil ===
==== First round ====
The draw for the first round was held on 7 February 2025, 15:00 UTC−03:00, at the CBF headquarters in Rio de Janeiro.

19 February Single match	São Raimundo–RR	1–1 (1–4 p)	Grêmio	Boa Vista
19:30 UTC−3	Kanté 66'	Report	Olivera 90+3'; Edenilson (red card) 90+6'	Stadium: Estádio Canarinho; Attendance: 5,000; Referee: Gustavo Ervino Bauermann
	Penalties
	Luã Niger (penalty missed); Juninho (penalty scored); Klebinho (penalty missed)		(penalty scored) Braithwaite; (penalty scored) Jemerson; (penalty scored) Arezo; (penalty scored) Volpi

==== Second round ====
12 March Single match	Athletic Club	3–3 (7–8 p)	Grêmio	São João del-Rei
19:30 UTC−3	David Braga 3'; Fumaça 47'; João Lucas 90+4' (o.g.)	Report	Braithwaite 11'; João Lucas 21'; Luan Cândido (red card) 44'; Arezo 88'	Stadium: Estádio Joaquim Portugal; Attendance: 3,600; Referee: Matheus Delgado Candançan
	Penalties
	David Braga (penalty scored); Fumaça (penalty scored); Yuri (penalty scored); Wesley Gasolina (penalty scored); Mateus Gonçalves (penalty scored); Neto Costa (penalty scored); Amorim (penalty scored); Edson Miranda (penalty missed)		(penalty scored) Wagner Leonardo; (penalty scored) Jemerson; (penalty scored) Arezo; (penalty scored) Olivera; (penalty scored) Dodi; (penalty scored) Camilo; (penalty scored) Gustavo Martins; (penalty scored) João Lucas

==== Third round ====
The draw for the third round was held on 9 April 2025, 15:00 UTC−03:00, at the CBF headquarters in Rio de Janeiro.

30 April First leg	CSA	3–2	Grêmio	Maceió
21:30 UTC−3	Tiago Marques 15'; Marcelinho 87'; Brayann 90+2'	Report	Braithwaite 23'; Dodi 80'	Stadium: Estádio Rei Pelé; Attendance: 9,739; Referee: Paulo César Zanovelli da Silva

20 May Second leg	Grêmio	0–0 (2–3 agg.)	CSA	Porto Alegre
21:30 UTC−3	Arezo (red card) 90+3'	Report		Stadium: Arena do Grêmio; Attendance: 13,164; Referee: Matheus Delgado Candançan

== Statistics ==
=== Goalscorers ===
As of 7 December 2025

Rank	No.	Pos.	Nat.	Player	Campeonato Brasileiro	Campeonato Gaúcho	Copa do Brasil	Copa Sudamericana	Recopa Gaúcha	Total
1	22	FW	(Denmark)	Martin Braithwaite	6	6	2	1	0	15
2	95	FW	(Brazil)	Carlos Vinícius	12	0	0	0	0	12
3	19	FW	(Uruguay)	Matías Arezo	1	2	1	2	0	6
3	77	FW	(Brazil)	André Henrique	5	1	0	0	0	6
5	8	MF	(Brazil)	Edenilson	3	1	0	1	0	5
5	9	FW	(Belgium)	Francis Amuzu	4	0	0	0	1	5
5	16	FW	(Chile)	Alexander Aravena	3	1	0	1	0	5
5	53	DF	(Brazil)	Gustavo Martins	2	2	0	1	0	5
5	99	FW	(Uruguay)	Cristian Olivera	2	1	1	1	0	5
10	7	FW	(Argentina)	Cristian Pavon	0	3	0	0	0	3
10	10	MF	(Argentina)	Franco Cristaldo	1	2	0	0	0	3
10	11	MF	(Colombia)	Miguel Monsalve	0	3	0	0	0	3
13	1	GK	(Brazil)	Tiago Volpi	2	0	0	0	0	2
13	47	FW	(Brazil)	Alysson	1	0	0	0	1	2
15	2	DF	(Brazil)	João Lucas	0	0	1	0	0	1
15	3	DF	(Brazil)	Wagner Leonardo	0	1	0	0	0	1
15	13	DF	(Paraguay)	Fabián Balbuena	1	0	0	0	0	1
15	17	MF	(Brazil)	Dodi	0	0	1	0	0	1
15	18	DF	(Brazil)	João Pedro	0	0	0	1	0	1
15	21	DF	(Brazil)	Jemerson	1	0	0	0	0	1
15	23	DF	(Brazil)	Marlon	1	0	0	0	0	1
15	65	MF	(Brazil)	Riquelme	0	0	0	1	0	1
15	88	MF	(Brazil)	Willian	1	0	0	0	0	1
Own goals					1	0	0	0	0	1
Totals					47	23	6	9	2	87
