= Wesley Costa =

Brazilian footballer (born 2005)

Personal information
- Full name: Wesley da Costa Silva
- Date of birth: 4 February 2004 (age 22)
- Place of birth: Alvorada, Brazil
- Position: Left-back

Team information
- Current team: Grêmio
- Number: 46

Youth career
- 2015–2016: Internacional
- 2017–2020: São José-RS
- 2020–2025: Grêmio

Senior career*
Years	Team	Apps	(Gls)
2023–	Grêmio	1	(0)
- * Club domestic league appearances and goals as of 14:48, 30 October 2023 (UTC)

Wesley da Costa Silva (born 4 February 2004), known as Wesley Costa or just Wesley, is a Brazilian professional footballer who plays as a left-back for Grêmio.

== Career ==
Born in Alvorada, Rio Grande do Sul, Wesley joined Grêmio's youth setup in 2020, after representing São José-RS and Internacional. On 21 February 2022, he signed his first professional contract with the latter club, agreeing to a deal until December 2024.

Wesley was promoted to the main squad in June 2023, after the departure of Diogo Barbosa. He made his first team – and Série A – debut on 21 October, starting in a 3–0 away loss to São Paulo.

== Career statistics ==
As of 30 October 2023

Appearances and goals by club, season and competition
Club	Season	League			State League		National Cup		Continental		Other		Total	
Club	Season	Division	Apps	Goals	Apps	Goals	Apps	Goals	Apps	Goals	Apps	Goals	Apps	Goals
Grêmio	2023	Série A	1	0	—		—		—		—		1	0
Career total			1	0	0	0	0	0	0	0	0	0	1	0

== Honours ==
Grêmio

- Campeonato Gaúcho: 2024
