= Riquelme (footballer, born January 2007) =

Brazilian footballer

Personal information
- Full name: Riquelme Felipe da Silva de Oliveira
- Date of birth: 3 January 2007 (age 19)
- Place of birth: Campo Alegre, Brazil
- Height: 1.90 m (6 ft 3 in)
- Position: Centre-back

Team information
- Current team: Botafogo

Youth career
- 2022–2025: Sport Recife

Senior career*
Years	Team	Apps	(Gls)
2025	Sport Recife	2	(0)
2026–	Botafogo	0	(0)
- * Club domestic league appearances and goals as of 16:10, 19 November 2025 (UTC)

Riquelme Felipe da Silva de Oliveira (born 3 January 2007), simply known as Riquelme, is a Brazilian professional footballer who plays as a centre-back for Botafogo.

== Career ==
Born in Luziápolis, Campo Alegre, Alagoas, Riquelme began his career in a Villarreal CF project in Maceió, before joining the youth sides of Sport Recife in 2022. In 2024, he signed his first professional contract with the club, agreeing to a deal until 2028.

Riquelme made his first team – and Série A – debut on 8 November 2025, coming on as a late substitute for Rafael Thyere in a 4–2 home loss to Atlético Mineiro. Shortly after, Botafogo reached an agreement with Sport for his transfer for the 2026 season.

== Career statistics ==
As of 19 November 2025

Appearances and goals by club, season and competition
Club	Season	League			State League (Note: Includes Campeonato Pernambucano)		Cup (Note: Includes Copa do Brasil)		Continental		Other		Total	
Club	Season	Division	Apps	Goals	Apps	Goals	Apps	Goals	Apps	Goals	Apps	Goals	Apps	Goals
Sport Recife	2025	Série A	2	0	0	0	0	0	—		0	0	2	0
Botafogo	2026	0	0	0	0	0	0	0	0	—		0	0	
Career total			2	0	0	0	0	0	0	0	0	0	2	0
