= João Araújo (footballer) =

Brazilian footballer (born 2005)

Araújo
Personal information
- Full name: João Vitor Araújo da Silva
- Date of birth: 20 June 2005 (age 21)
- Place of birth: Porto Alegre, Brazil
- Position: Defensive midfielder

Youth career
- São José-RS
- Aimoré
- 2022: → Ceará (loan)
- 2023–2025: Grêmio

Senior career*
Years	Team	Apps	(Gls)
2023–2025	Grêmio	1	(0)
- * Club domestic league appearances and goals as of 19:38, 28 October 2023 (UTC)

João Vitor Araújo da Silva (born 20 June 2005), known as Araújo or João Araújo, is a Brazilian professional footballer who plays as a defensive midfielder.

== Career ==
Born in Porto Alegre, Rio Grande do Sul, Araújo joined Grêmio's youth setup in 2023, after representing Ceará, Aimoré and São José-RS. On 17 October of that year, he signed his first professional contract with the former club.

Araújo made his first team – and Série A – debut on 21 October 2023, coming on as a second-half substitute for fellow youth graduate Josué in a 3–0 away loss to São Paulo.

== Career statistics ==
As of 28 October 2023

Appearances and goals by club, season and competition
Club	Season	League			State League		National Cup		Continental		Other		Total	
Club	Season	Division	Apps	Goals	Apps	Goals	Apps	Goals	Apps	Goals	Apps	Goals	Apps	Goals
Grêmio	2023	Série A	1	0	—		—		—		—		1	0
Career total			1	0	0	0	0	0	0	0	0	0	1	0

== Honours ==
Grêmio

- Campeonato Gaúcho: 2024
