= Gabriel Pereira (footballer, born 1997) =

Brazilian association football player

Personal information
- Full name: Gabriel Pereira da Silva
- Date of birth: 18 January 1997 (age 29)
- Place of birth: Campo Grande, Brazil
- Height: 1.81 m (5 ft 11 in)
- Position: Forward

Youth career
- –2014: Fluminense
- 2015–2017: Vitória

Senior career*
Years	Team	Apps	(Gls)
2015–2017	Vitória	2	(0)
2017	→ Fortaleza (loan)	3	(1)
2018	Boa	0	(0)
2018–2019	Académico Viseu	16	(0)
2019–2020	Pirin Blagoevgrad	14	(1)
- * Club domestic league appearances and goals as of 11:06, 1 August 2020 (UTC)

Gabriel Pereira da Silva (born 18 January 1997), commonly known as Gabriel Pereira, is a Brazilian professional footballer who plays as a forward.

== Career statistics ==
=== Club ===
As of 1 July 2019.

Club	Season	League			National Cup		League Cup		Continental		Other		Total	
Club	Season	Division	Apps	Goals	Apps	Goals	Apps	Goals	Apps	Goals	Apps	Goals	Apps	Goals
Vitória	2015	Série B	1	0	1 (Note: Appearances in the Copa do Brasil)	0	–		–		0	0	2	0
Vitória	2016	Série A	1	0	0	0	–		0	0	0	0	1	0
Vitória	2017	Série A	0	0	0	0	–		–		0	0	0	0
Vitória	Total		2	0	1	0	0	0	0	0	0	0	3	0
Fortaleza (loan)	2017	Série C	3	1	1	0	6 (Note: Appearances in the Copa do Nordeste)	0	–		11 (Note: Appearances in the Campeonato Cearense)	3	21	4
Boa	2018	Série B	0	0	1	0	–		–		7 (Note: Appearances in the Campeonato Mineiro)	0	8	0
Académico Viseu	2018–19	LigaPro	16	0	2 (Note: Appearances in the Taça de Portugal)	0	1 (Note: Appearances in the Taça da Liga)	0	–		0	0	19	0
Career total			21	1	5	0	7	0	0	0	18	3	51	4
