= Nathan Fernandes =

Brazilian footballer (born 2005)

Personal information
- Full name: Nathan Ribeiro Fernandes
- Date of birth: 16 February 2005 (age 21)
- Place of birth: Campos dos Goytacazes, Brazil
- Height: 1.76 m (5 ft 9 in)
- Position: Forward

Team information
- Current team: Ludogorets (on loan from Botafogo)
- Number: 10

Youth career
- 2016–2023: Grêmio

Senior career*
Years	Team	Apps	(Gls)
2023–2025	Grêmio	41	(3)
2025–	Botafogo	22	(1)
2026–	→ Ludogorets (loan)	2	(0)

International career^{‡}
2025–	Brazil U20	5	(0)
Medal record
Men's football
Representing Brazil
South American U-20 Championship
Winner	2025 Venezuela
- * Club domestic league appearances and goals as of 9 September 2026 ‡ National team caps and goals as of 16:35, 17 February 2025 (UTC)

Nathan Ribeiro Fernandes (born 16 February 2005) is a Brazilian professional footballer who plays as a forward for Bulgarian First League club Ludogorets Razgrad on loan from Botafogo.

== Career ==
=== Grêmio ===
Born in Campos dos Goytacazes, Rio de Janeiro, Nathan joined Grêmio's youth setup in 2016, aged ten. He signed a youth deal on 21 March 2019, and then signed a professional three-year contract in February 2021, and was linked to Dutch club Ajax one year later, even before his senior debut.

On 25 May 2023, Nathan agreed to renew his contract with the Tricolor until 2026. He made his first team – and Série A – debut two days later, coming on as a late substitute for Everton Galdino in a 2–1 away win over Athletico Paranaense.

On 10 June 2023, Nathan further extended his link with Grêmio until 2028. He scored his first professional goal on 25 October, netting his team's second in a 3–2 home win over Flamengo.

=== Botafogo ===
On 14 February 2025, Botafogo announced the signing of Nathan on a five-year contract.

== Career statistics ==
As of 17 February 2025

Appearances and goals by club, season and competition
Club	Season	League			State League		National Cup		Continental		Other		Total	
Club	Season	Division	Apps	Goals	Apps	Goals	Apps	Goals	Apps	Goals	Apps	Goals	Apps	Goals
Grêmio	2023	Série A	11	1	—		0	0	—		3 (Note: Appearance(s) in Copa FGF)	0	14	1
Grêmio	2024	Série A	19	0	11	2	2	0	6 (Note: Appearance(s) in Copa Libertadores)	1	1 (Note: Appearance(s) in Recopa Gaúcha)	0	39	3
Grêmio	Total		30	1	11	2	2	0	6	1	4	0	53	4
Botafogo	2025	Série A	0	0	0	0	0	0	0	0	0	0	0	0
Career total			30	1	11	2	2	0	6	1	4	0	53	4

== Honours ==
Grêmio

- Campeonato Gaúcho: 2024

Brazil U20

- South American Youth Football Championship: 2025
