= 1920 Campeonato Gaúcho =

Sports league season

Campeonato Gaúcho
- Season: 1920
- Champions: Guarany de Bagé (1st title)
- Matches played: 3

The 1920 Campeonato Gaúcho was the second season of Rio Grande do Sul's top association football league.Guarany de Bagé won the title for the first time.

== Format ==
The championship was contested by the four regional champions in a single round-robin system, with the team with the most points winning the title.

== Qualified teams ==
Club	Location	Qualification method	Titles
Grêmio	Porto Alegre	Champions of the First Region	0
Guarany de Bagé	Bagé	Champions of the Second Region	0
Uruguaiana	Uruguaiana	Champions of the Fourth Region	0

The regional championships were also contested by Nacional from São Leopoldo and Juventude from Caxias do Sul (first region), Ideal from Pelotas and São Paulo from Rio Grande (second region) and 14 de Julho from Santana do Livramento. Guarany from Cruz Alta, being the only club from the third region affiliated to the Rio Grande do Sul's FA, was invited to participate, but did not answer the invitation.

== Championship ==
Pos	Team	Pld	W	D	L	GF	GA	GD	Pts
1	Guarany de Bagé (C)	2	2	0	0	2	0	+2	4
2	Grêmio	2	1	0	1	3	1	+2	2
3	Uruguaiana	2	0	0	2	0	4	−4	0

(C) Champions
15 November 1920

Guarany de Bagé	1–0	Grêmio
Goal

Pelotas
18 November 1920

Grêmio	3–0	Uruguaiana
Goal

Pelotas
21 November 1920

Guarany de Bagé	1–0	Uruguaiana
Goal

Pelotas
