= 1921 Campeonato Gaúcho =

Campeonato Gaúcho
- Season: 1921
- Champions: Grêmio (1st title)
- Matches played: 6
- Goals scored: 13 (2.17 per match)
- Top goalscorer: Fernando Birriel (Mosquito) – 3 goals

The 1921 Campeonato Gaúcho was the third season of Rio Grande do Sul's top association football league. Grêmio won the title for the first time.

== Format ==
The championship was contested by the four regional champions in a single round-robin system, with the team with the most points winning the title. If two teams finished with the same number of points, a tie-breaking match would be played.

== Qualified teams ==
Club	Location	Qualification method	Titles
Brasil de Pelotas	Pelotas	Champions of the Second Region	1
Grêmio	Porto Alegre	Champions of the First Region	0
Riograndense	Santa Maria	Champions of the Third Region	0
Uruguaiana	Uruguaiana	Champions of the Fourth Region	0

- Juventude, Nacional and FC Montenegro were eliminated in the First Region Championship.
- Rio-Grandense, Guarany de Bagé and Sport Club 247 from São Gabriel were eliminated in the Second Region Championship.
- 7 de Setembro from Tupanciretã, Guarany de Cruz Alta and Cachoeira FC were eliminated in the Third Region Championship.
- 14 de Julho, Quaraí FC and Guarani de Alegrete were eliminated in the Fourth Region Championship.

== Championship ==
Pos	Team	Pld	W	D	L	GF	GA	GD	Pts
1	Grêmio (C)	3	2	1	0	3	1	+2	5
2	Riograndense	3	2	0	1	6	3	+3	4
3	Brasil de Pelotas	3	1	1	1	3	3	0	3
4	Uruguaiana	3	0	0	3	1	6	−5	0

(C) Champions
13 November 1921

Grêmio	1–0	Riograndense
Bruno

Estádio da Baixada, Porto Alegre
15 November 1921

Uruguaiana	0–1	Brasil de Pelotas
		Ignácio

Estádio da Baixada, Porto Alegre
19 November 1921

Riograndense	4–1	Uruguaiana
Fernando Birriel; Willy		Bate-Bate

Estádio da Baixada, Porto Alegre
20 November 1921

Grêmio	1–1	Brasil de Pelotas
Lagarto		Rosseli

Estádio da Baixada, Porto Alegre
22 November 1921

Riograndense	2–1	Brasil de Pelotas
Willy; Tica o.g.'		Correia o.g.'

Estádio da Baixada, Porto Alegre
24 November 1921

Grêmio	1–0	Uruguaiana
Bruno

Estádio da Baixada, Porto Alegre
