= Grêmio FBPA =

Football club in Porto Alegre, Brazil

Grêmio
- Full name: Grêmio Foot-Ball Porto Alegrense
- Nicknames: Imortal Tricolor (Immortal Tricolor); Tricolor dos Pampas (Tricolor of the Pampas); Clube de Todos (Club of All)
- Founded: 15 September 1903; 123 years ago
- Ground: Arena do Grêmio
- Capacity: 55,662
- President: Odorico Roman
- Head coach: Renato Portaluppi
- League: Campeonato Brasileiro Série A Campeonato Gaúcho
- 2025 2026: Série A, 9th of 20; Gauchão, 1st of 12 (winners)
- Website: gremio.net
Home colours	Away colours	Third colours

Grêmio Foot-Ball Porto Alegrense (Brazilian Portuguese pronunciation: [ˈɡɾemi.u futʃiˈbɔw ˌpoʁtwaleˈɡɾẽsi]), commonly known as Grêmio, is a Brazilian professional football club based in Porto Alegre, the capital city of the Brazilian state of Rio Grande do Sul. The club plays in the Campeonato Brasileiro Série A, the first division of the Brazilian football league system, and the Campeonato Gaúcho, Rio Grande do Sul's top state league. The club was founded in 1903 by businessman Cândido Dias da Silva and 32 other men, mostly from the large community of German immigrants of Porto Alegre.

Grêmio's home stadium is the Arena do Grêmio, which the team moved to in 2013. With a capacity of over 55,000, the stadium is one of the most modern venues in South America and the eight-largest of its kind in Brazil. Prior to that, Grêmio played at Estádio Olímpico Monumental since 1954. Grêmio usually plays in a tricolor (blue, black, and white) striped shirt, black shorts, and white socks, which originated the team's nickname.

In 1983, Grêmio became champions of the Intercontinental Cup after defeating Hamburger SV 2–1. Additionally, Grêmio have three Copa CONMEBOL Libertadores de América.

In 2017, Grêmio was ranked first in the CBF club rankings and is listed by Forbes as the third most valuable football club in the Americas with an estimated value of $295.5 million. Grêmio has won 44 Campeonato Gaúcho, 2 Campeonato Brasileiro Série A, 1 Campeonato Brasileiro Série B, 1 Supercopa do Brasil, 1 Copa Sul, and 5 Copa do Brasil. Internationally, Grêmio has won 1 Intercontinental Cup, 3 Copa Libertadores de América, 2 Recopa Sudamericana, and 1 Sanwa Bank Cup.

Grêmio has a long-standing rivalry with Internacional, known as Grenal, widely regarded as one of the fiercest in Brazil, and around the world.

== History ==
=== The beginning and professionalism at the club ===
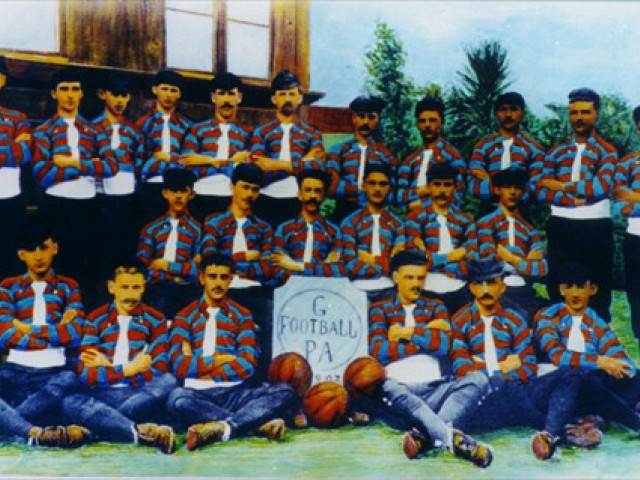
One of the first Grêmio squads, December 1903

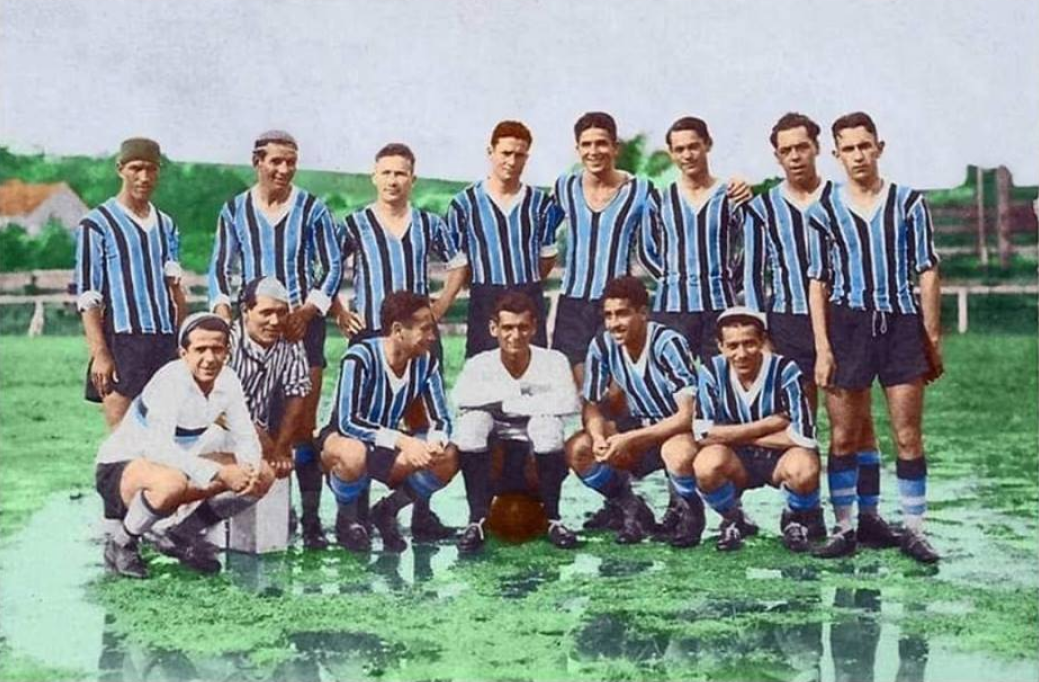
Grêmio state champion of 1932. Standing: Poroto, Nenê, Sardinha I, Foguinho, (), Heitor, Luiz Carvalho e Lacy. Crouching: Amâncio, (), Sardinha II, Eurico Lara, Dário e Comani.

On 7 September 1903, Brazil's oldest football team, Sport Club Rio Grande, played an exhibition match in Porto Alegre. An entrepreneur from Sorocaba, São Paulo, named Cândido Dias was besotted with the sport and he went to watch the match. During the match, the ball deflated. As the only owner of a football in Porto Alegre, he lent his ball to the players and the match resumed. After the match, he talked to the local players about how to start a football club. On 15 September 1903, 32 people, including Cândido Dias, met at Salão Grau, a local restaurant and founded "Grêmio Foot-Ball Porto Alegrense". Most of the founding members were part of the city's German community. Carlos Luiz Bohrer was elected as first president.

The club's first match took place on 6 March 1904, against Fuss Ball Porto Alegre, the first of two matches played that day. Grêmio won the first match 1–0. Unfortunately, the name of the player who scored the club's first goal is lost to history. The trophy Grêmio won that day, the Wanderpreis, is still displayed at the club's museum. Within 5 months the club had inaugurated the Baixada, its first home.

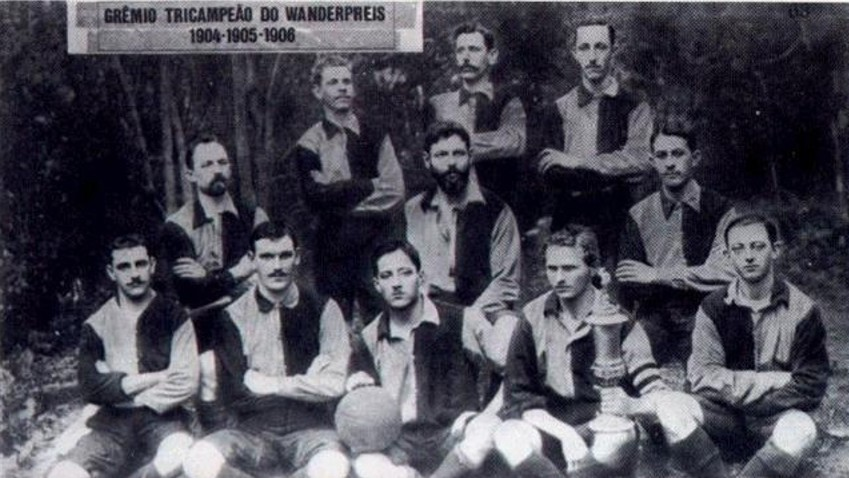
Grêmio in 1904, wearing the blue and black jersey

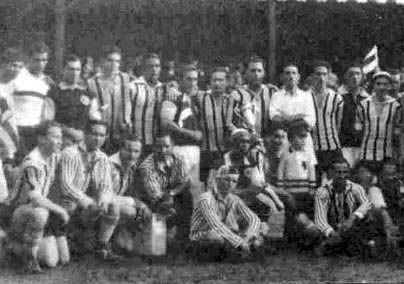
Grêmio state champion of 1931

On 18 July 1909, Grêmio beat Internacional 10–0 on the latter's debut game. Grêmio's goalkeeper Kallfelz reportedly left the field to chat with fans during the match. Even now this victory is remembered with pride by Gremistas (Grêmio supporters). The match was the starting point for a rivalry that rages on to this day. Grêmio was one of the founding members of the Porto Alegre football league in 1910, and in 1911 won the league for the first time. On 25 August 1912, in a city league match, Grêmio beat Sport Clube Nacional of Porto Alegre 23–0. Sisson scored 14 goals in the match to record Grêmio's biggest ever win. In 1918, Grêmio became a founding member of the Fundação Rio-Grandense de Desportes (later known as Federação Gaúcha de Futebol), a federation that organized the first state championships in Rio Grande do Sul. The first championship was scheduled for 1918, but the Spanish flu epidemic forced the event to be postponed until 1919. In 1921, a year after the arrival of legendary goalkeeper Eurico Lara, Grêmio won its first state championship.

On 7 July 1911, Grêmio beat Uruguay's national team 2–1. In 1931, Grêmio became one of the first teams in Brazil to play matches at night after installing floodlights at Estádio Baixada. On 19 May 1935, Grêmio became the first team from Rio Grande do Sul to beat a team from the state of São Paulo (considered the strongest Brazilian league at the time) by defeating Santos 3–2. Grêmio was also the first club outside Rio de Janeiro state to play at the Maracanã Stadium, defeating Flamengo 3–1 in 1950.

During this period, Grêmio started to earn a reputation abroad. In 1932 it played its first international match in Rivera (Uruguay). In 1949, the match against Uruguay's Nacional ended in a 3–1 win for Grêmio and the players received a hero's welcome on their return to Porto Alegre. In that same year, Grêmio played for the first time in Central America. Between 1953 and 1954, Grêmio travelled to Mexico, Ecuador and Colombia, a tour dubbed "the conquest of the Americas". On 25 February 1959, Grêmio defeated Boca Juniors 4–1 in Buenos Aires, becoming the first foreign team to beat Boca at La Bombonera.

In 1961, Grêmio went on its first European tour playing 24 games in 11 countres: France, Romania, Belgium, Greece, Germany, Poland, Bulgaria, Luxembourg, Denmark, Estonia and Russia. The Gremistas (Grêmio fans) were growing in number. 1946 saw the first appearance of the club's motto "com o Grêmio onde o Grêmio estiver" ("with Grêmio wherever Grêmio may be"), which was later written into Grêmio's official anthem. An anthem penned by Lupicinio Rodrigues, a samba-cancao composer who became one of the most famous and revered Grêmio fans. The anthem celebrates the Gremistas reputation for attending all Grêmio matches, regardless of the difficulties and obstacles they might have to overcome to see their club. In the late 1950s, Grêmio joined the Taça Brasil, as the Brazilian league was known at the time. The team reached the Taça Brasil semi-finals in 1959, 1963 and 1967. In 1968, the team won its first international title in a friendly cup with teams from Brazil and Uruguay. In 1954, Grêmio inaugurated what was at the time the biggest private stadium in Brazil, the Olímpico Stadium. In 1971, the Taça Brasil championship was replaced by the Campeonato Brasileiro with the first goal ever scored in the Campeonato Brasileiro coming from Grêmio's Néstor Scotta, an Argentine, in a match against São Paulo at Estádio do Morumbi. Grêmio maintained a series of respectable results in Campeonato Brasileiro, usually achieving a top half finish.

=== Valdir Espinosa and the Intercontinental Cup 1983 ===
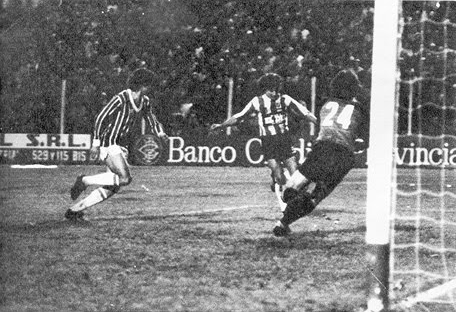
Battle of La Plata, the popular name to an emblematic and historic game between Grêmio vs. Estudiantes de La Plata in 1983 Copa Libertadores. The match ended in 3–3 with aggressions and hostile climate at the Jorge Luis Hirschi stadium

Grêmio's first dominant period in South American football began in the early 1980s. Propelled by the completion of their new stadium, the Olímpico Monumental.

Grêmio won its first Campeonato Brasileiro on 3 May 1981, after defeating São Paulo at the Morumbi Stadium in São Paulo. The scores in the two-leg final were 2–1 at Olímpico and 1–0 for Grêmio at Morumbi. The winning goal was scored by striker Baltazar. Earlier, on 26 April 1981 Olímpico had its biggest attendance ever, when 98,421 fans watched Grêmio lose to Ponte Preta 0–1 in the Campeonato Brasileiro semi-final.

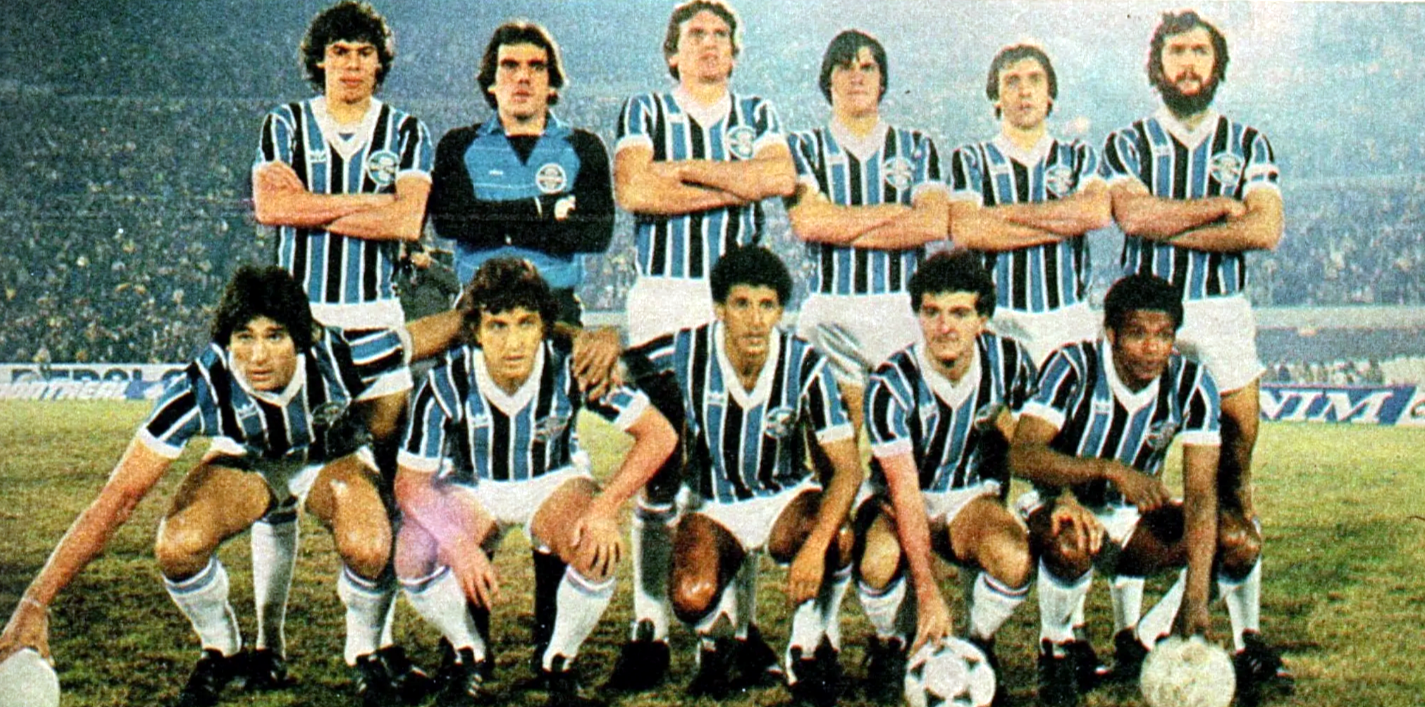
Grêmio squad that played the first 1983 Copa Libertadores Finals vs Peñarol in Montevideo

1983 was the most successful year in Grêmio's history. First, Grêmio won the South-American Copa Libertadores, after a consistent yet eventful campaign. One of the matches of the semi-final, the 3–3 draw against Estudiantes at Jorge Luis Hirschi Stadium, became legendary for its belligerence on and off the pitch and is dubbed the "Batalha de La Plata" ("Battle of La Plata"). In the finals, Grêmio beat the 1982 South America and World champions Peñarol from Uruguay, with a 1–1 draw in Montevideo and a 2–1 win in Porto Alegre. The winning goal was scored by César just before the end of the match. A year later, Grêmio was runner-up in the Copa Libertadores final, being defeated by Argentina's Independiente.

Also in 1983, Grêmio won the Intercontinental Cup after defeating Hamburger SV of Germany 2–1. Renato Portaluppi scored both goals. With Uruguayan defender De León and goalkeeper Mazaropi also earning club legend status on the back of their performances in the Copa Libertadores and Intercontinental Cup. Porto Alegre, was deafened by the gremista's chant of: "The Earth is Blue". Soon after winning the Intercontinental Cup, Grêmio beat America of Mexico in Los Angeles, and won the Los Angeles Cup.

In 1989, Grêmio won the first Copa do Brasil, a Brazilian knockout cup featuring football teams from all around the country. After humiliating Flamengo with a 6–1 win in the second leg of the semi-finals, Grêmio defeated Sport Recife in the final, with a 0–0 draw in Recife and a 2–1 win in Porto Alegre.

In 1991, after a poor season, Grêmio was relegated for the first time to the Brazilian Second Division but gained immediate promotion back to the Campeonato Brasileiro's elite the following season (1993). After this return to form, 1994 saw Grêmio win its second Copa do Brasil, defeating Ceará in the two-leg final (0–0 and 1–0), the solitary goal scored by striker Nildo. This win kickstarted the club's Tokyo Project.

On 11 December 1994, due a bloated and extensive schedule, Grêmio had to play three matches in a single day at the Olímpico Monumental during the 1994 Campeonato Gaúcho. These matches began at 2 p.m., 4 p.m., and 8 p.m. against Aimoré, Santa Cruz, and Brasil de Pelotas respectively. They drew the first match and won the other two, using a total of 34 different players from the first team, reserves and academy. The matches had a small public attendance of 758 fans — 247 paying. The matches were also played in temperatures of 45 °C (113 °F) in the summer heat of Porto Alegre.

=== Luiz Felipe Scolari and the Libertadores 1995 ===
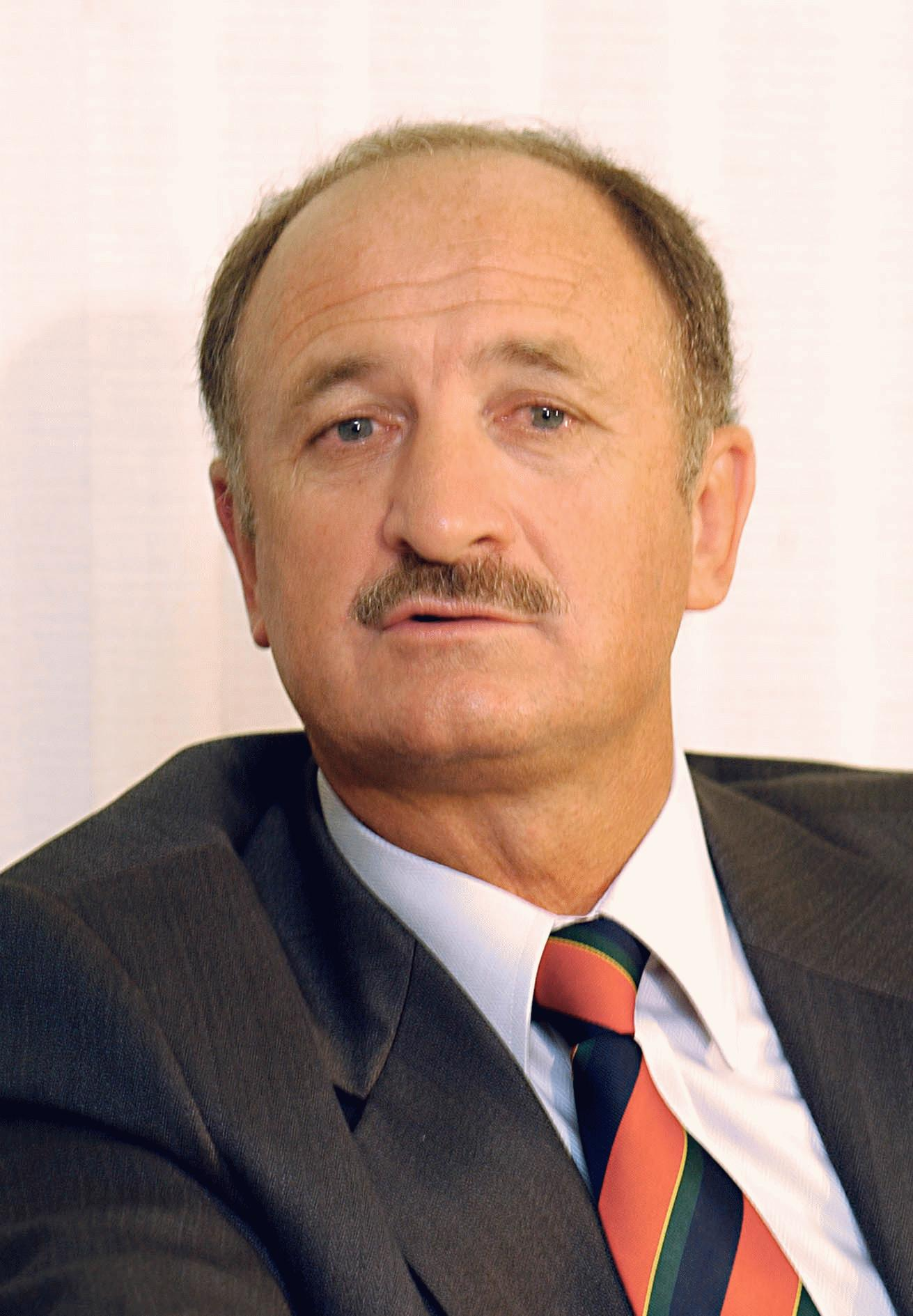
Luiz Felipe Scolari won the 1995 Copa Libertadores, the 1996 Campeonato Brasileiro and other important competitions

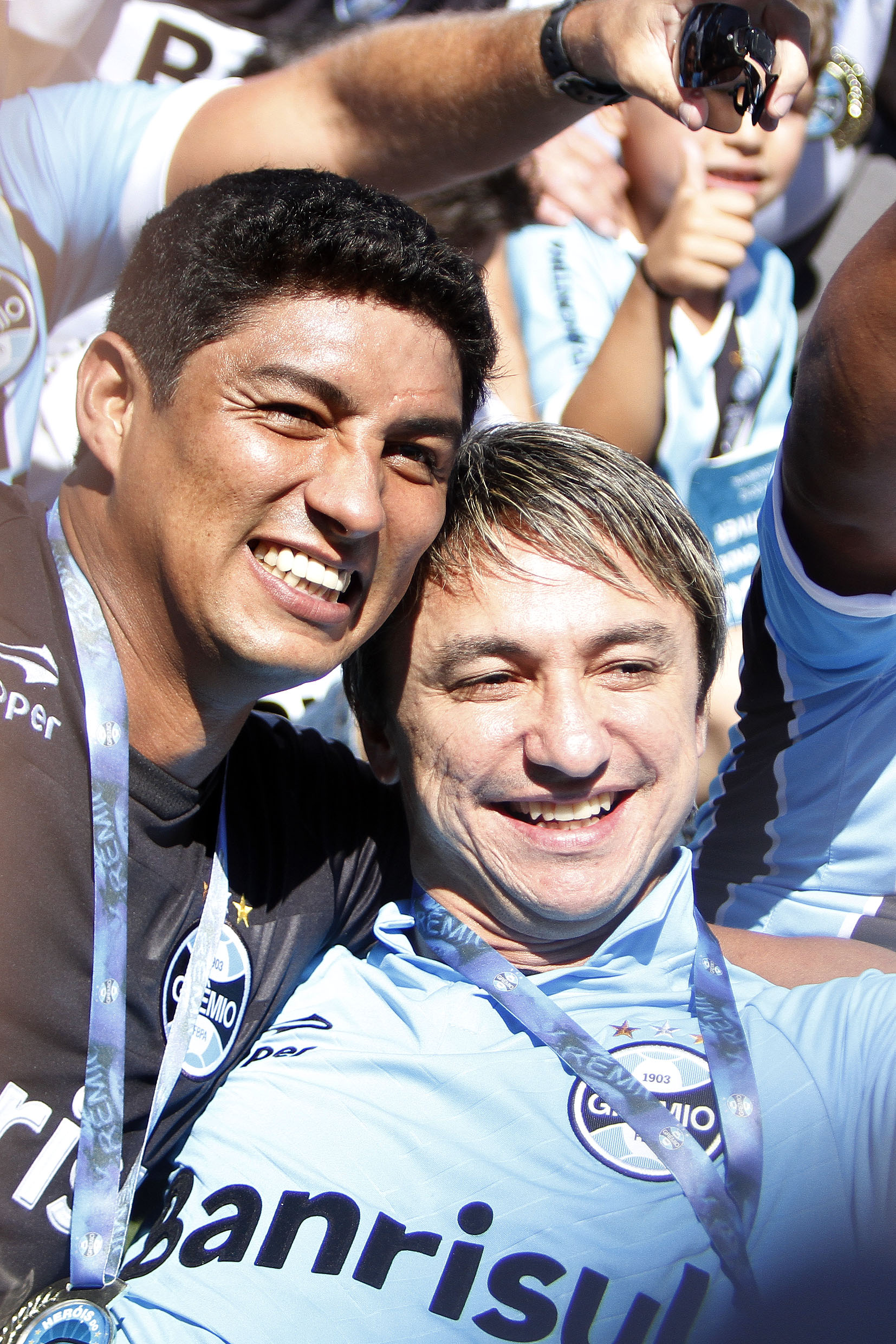
Mário Jardel and Paulo Nunes lead Grêmio to reach practically all trophies of the 1990s. Together they won the 1995 Copa Libertadores and the 1996 Recopa Sudamericana

In May 1995, under head coach Luiz Felipe Scolari, Grêmio were runners-up in the Copa do Brasil, losing the final match to Corinthians 0–1 at Olímpico Monumental. In August, a few days after beating arch-rivals Internacional for the state title with a reserve squad, the club won the Copa Libertadores for the second time. Defeating Atlético Nacional of Colombia 3–1 in Porto Alegre and drawing 1–1 in Medellín. The tournament was marked by fierce matches against Palmeiras in the quarter-finals. Palmeiras had perhaps the best squad on the competition, with players such as Rivaldo, Cafu, Edmundo, César Sampaio, Antônio Carlos, Roberto Carlos and Mancuso. They were soundly beaten by Grêmio in the 1st leg in an epic 5–0 match with a hat-trick from Mário Jardel. Palmeiras beat Grêmio 5–1 in the return leg, with Jardel's lone strike proving enough to see Grêmio through to the Semi-finals.

This qualified the club to the 1995 Intercontinental Cup where Grêmio pushed a talented Ajax (featuring Patrick Kluivert, Overmars, Van Der Sar and Kanu) into extra time and penalties despite being a player down. Early 1996 saw Grêmio win the Recopa Sudamericana, beating Argentina's Independiente 4–1.

On 15 December 1996, Grêmio won its second Campeonato Brasileiro, defeating Portuguesa in the final. Portuguesa won the first match at home 2–0, and therefore Grêmio was forced to win the final match at Porto Alegre by the same score or more. Grêmio got to 2–0, with midfielder Ailton scoring the second goal a few minutes before the final whistle. Grêmio won the title due to their higher finish in the league.

In 1997, Grêmio won their third Copa do Brasil title. In the finals against Romário's Flamengo, Grêmio won on away goals after a 0–0 draw in Porto Alegre and a 2–2 draw in Rio de Janeiro. Four years later, in 2001, Grêmio won their fourth Copa do Brasil, defeating Corinthians. The first leg of the final, in Porto Alegre, finished with the score of 2–2. The second game in São Paulo ended with a 3–1 Grêmio victory, in a match which is regarded as one of the finest in Grêmio's history.

=== Second relegation, Batalha dos Aflitos and the Libertadores 2007 ===
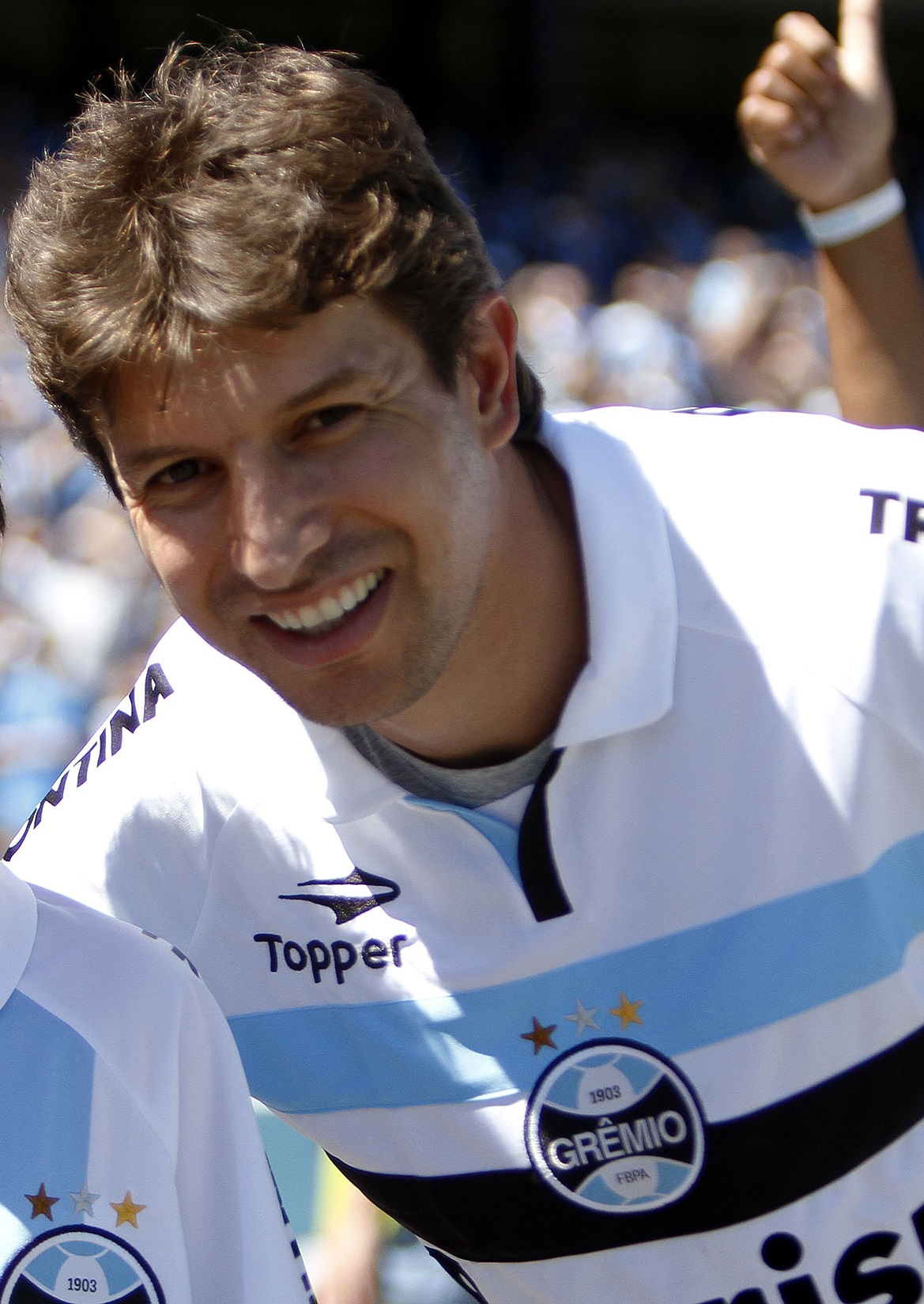
Tcheco was the captain for 4 years (2006–2009) and lead Grêmio to the 2007 Copa Libertadores Finals

On 2000, Grêmio closed a multi-million deal with Swiss sports marketing firm International Sport and Leisure (ISL). With the newfound income, Grêmio made large investments and expensive hirings, such as Zinho, Paulo Nunes, Gabriel Amato and Leonardo Astrada. However, soon in 2001 ISL went bust after a large corruption scandal involving FIFA. After declaring bankruptcy, the company transferred part its debt to Grêmio. The club's quickly amassed debt would spiral out of control, soon they would be unable to pay player's salaries and do other investments, which resulted in poor field performance.

In 2004, after performing poorly for two consecutive seasons in the Série A, Grêmio finished bottom of the league and were relegated to Campeonato Brasileiro's Second Division. Série B brought even less revenue, which combined with the club's large debt threatented to snowball into Grêmio's bankruptcy. Grêmio's promotion battle was difficult, with only two clubs able to qualify for promotion to the First Division. On 26 November 2005, at Estádio dos Aflitos, Recife against Náutico, Grêmio had four players sent off and two penalty given kicks against them in a tumultuous match that has become known as "The Battle of the Aflitos" ("A Batalha dos Aflitos", "Aflitos" being the name of Náutico's home field).

Bruno Carvalho bounced the first penalty bounced off the post in the first half when Grêmio still had 11 players on the field; the second was saved by goalkeeper Galatto when had been reduced to 7 men. Within 72 seconds of Galatto saving the penalty 17-year-old Anderson had made a run down the left flank to slot the ball into the back of the net to score Grêmio's winning goal. A goal that sealed the Série B championship and promotion to the Série A.

On 9 April 2006, at Estádio Beira-Rio, Grêmio won the state championship against Internacional, preventing them from winning a fifth title in a row. Playing away, Grêmio managed to obtain a 1–1 draw in the second leg of the final, enough to secure the title on away goals. Grêmio players said after the match that there were more than 50,000 Internacional fans in Beira Rio's Stadium and they could still hear the noise made by 6,000 Gremistas. In 2007, at Estádio Olímpico Monumental, Grêmio won the Campeonato Gaúcho once again this time against Juventude.

Also in 2007, Grêmio reached the final of the 2007 Copa Libertadores. Throughout the campaign the team overcame away losses by putting in heroic home performances and earning the moniker of Imortal Tricolor. This also pumped up the fans who even after a heavy 3–0 away defeat to Boca Juniors formed huge lines to buy tickets for the final game in Porto Alegre. with some of the fans queuing for four days or more. Unfortunately fan fervor wasn't enough with Riquelme's magnificent performance handing Boca Juniors a 2–0 win and the Copa Libertadores title.

=== Renato Portaluppi and the Libertadores 2017 ===
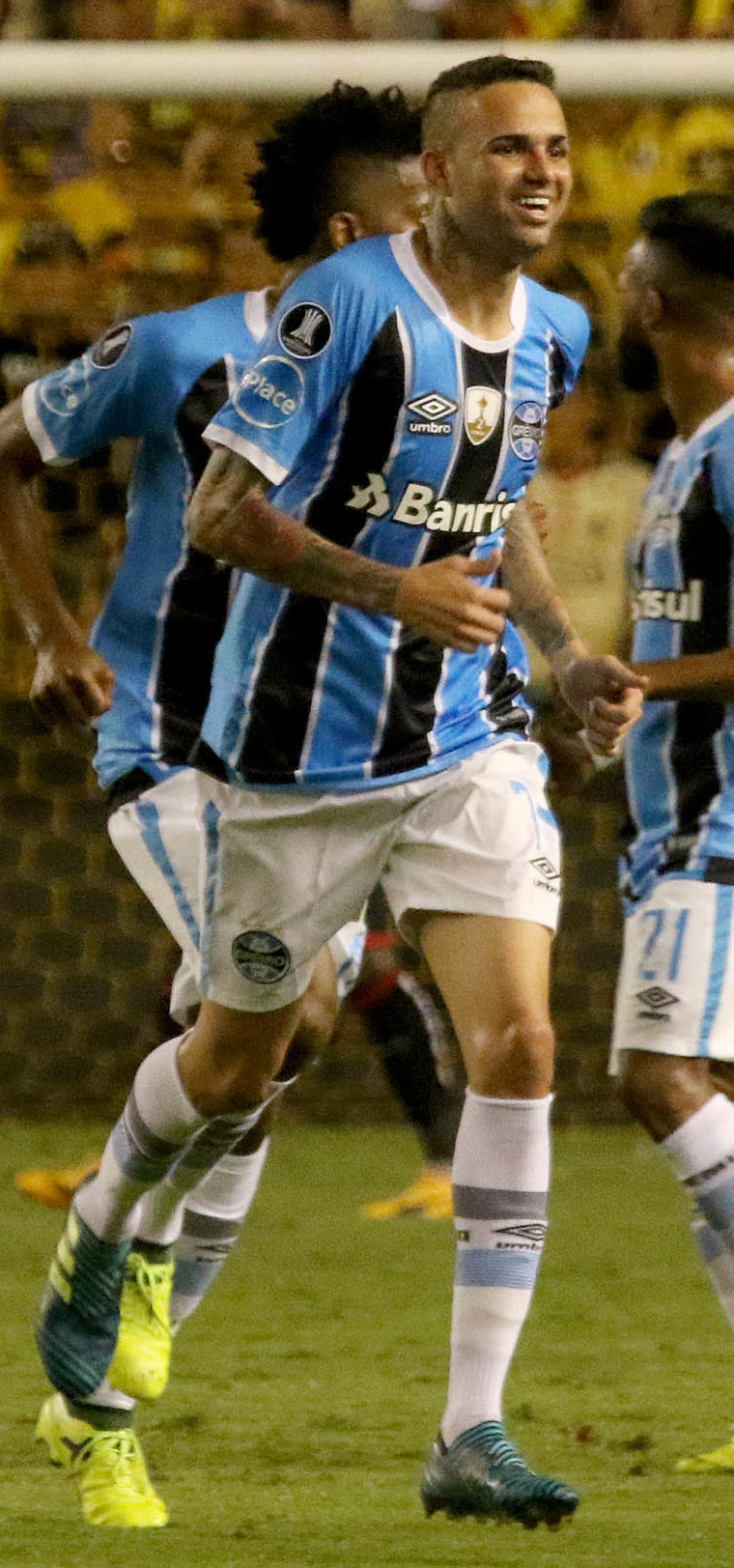
Luan after making his goal against Barcelona S.C. Luan was elected Rei da América 2017 (King of America 2017) by the newspaper El País (Uruguay).

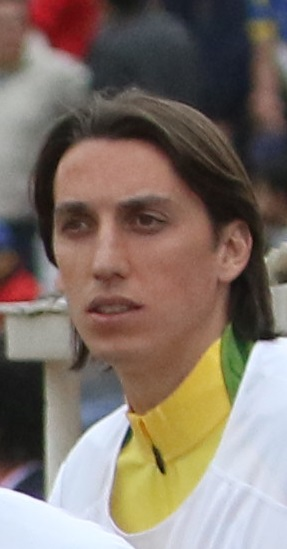
Pedro Geromel was the third Grêmio captain to raise the 2017 Copa Libertadores trophy. Later, he was nominated for the Brazilian 2018 FIFA World Cup squad.

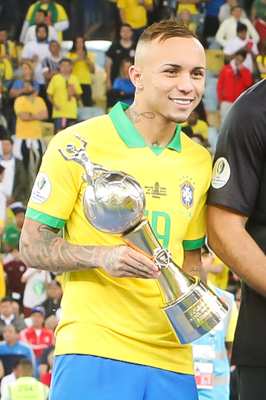
Everton, one of the most valuable players of Grêmio in the 2010s. He won the Copa América 2019, being the topscorer of the competition.

In 2008, after the sudden firing of their head coach Vagner Mancini, the club hired Celso Roth. Within a month they had prematurely dropped out of both the domestic cup (Copa do Brasil) and their state championship (Campeonato Gaúcho). This led to the team going through a state of crisis and, soon after, major renovation. They were expected to finish in the bottom half of the Campeonato Brasileiro but managed to finish in second place. For many supporters, even that was considered a failure as in the first half of the championship, the team was in fine form and even considered the best in the country. At the halfway point of the season the team had a 10-point lead over second place that they would eventually surrender in the final games of the season.

2012 marked the last year of the club's former stadium, Olímpico Monumental. Fan expectations were high but were not matched by the team's performance. Grêmio did, however, qualify for the Libertadores the following year.

In 2014, the club once again qualified for the Copa Libertadores de América and signed Enderson Moreira as the new manager. However, after a successful campaign in the group stage, Grêmio failed in the competition and were eliminated by San Lorenzo in the Round of 16. A few days before, the club was defeated 6–2 on aggregate by their biggest rival, the Internacional, in the finals of the Campeonato Gaúcho. With nothing more than a regular campaign at the beginning of the Série A, club president Fábio Koff signed Luiz Felipe Scolari as the new coach of the team. The club also invested in Giuliano, the biggest hiring of the year.

In 2015, former Grêmio player Roger Machado was hired as the new manager. A short lived but initially successful run, Machado's time with Grêmio saw them qualify for the 2016 Copa Libertadores with a finish in the Campeonato Brasileiro in 3rd place. Machado oversaw a famous victory over beat bitter rivals Internacional with a 5–0 drubbing in "Grenal" No. 407. Nonetheless, towards the end of the year, the team began to show a lack of organization, especially in its defensive system. As fan support dwindled, Roger announced his resignation after a 3–0 loss against Ponte Preta in September 2016. Renato Portaluppi replaced him and under his guidance a resurgent Grêmio became champions of the Copa do Brasil against Atlético Mineiro in a 4–2 aggregate score, making them the Brazilian club with the most titles in this tournament (5). After this historic feat, fans affectionately nicknamed Grêmio the "Rei de Copas" (King of Cups).

In 2017, Grêmio won their third Libertadores, after defeating Club Atlético Lanús 1–0 at Arena do Grêmio, followed by a 2–1 victory in Estadio Ciudad de Lanús. Luan was named the player of the tournament, while goalkeeper Marcelo Grohe performed spectacularly with a heroic, almost impossible save in the semi-final match against Barcelona Sporting Club. They became the third Brazilian club to win a third Copa Libertadores, after São Paulo and Santos.

The club went on to represent CONMEBOL at the 2017 FIFA Club World Cup, held in the United Arab Emirates. Grêmio beat Pachuca 1–0 in a tight semi-final, the goal coming from Everton in extra-time. They were beaten 0–1 by Real Madrid in the final.

=== 2018 Season and Libertadores ===
Grêmio once again finished 4th in the 2018 Campeonato Brasileiro securing a place in the Copa Libertadores de América having been knocked out in the semi-final of the tournament on goal-difference in 2018 by a late River Plate goal to end the match 2–2. The goal was scored from a penalty, given on review of a handball by the VAR from Matheus Bressan in the 95th minute. Bressan was subsequently transferred. In the hours following the match it was revealed that River Plate manager Marcelo Gallardo had broken the rules of his touchline ban at half-time by entering the River dressing room. Grêmio appealed the result within 24 hours of the final whistle based on this information. It took CONMEBOL 2 days to deliberate, deciding that the result should stand, with Gallardo receiving a $50,000 fine and a 4-match suspension (1 from the Bombonera Stadium for the first leg of the Libertadores final against Boca Juniors and 3 subsequent touchline bans). River Plate would go on to win the Copa Libertadores de América after further controversy.

In the 2020 season Grêmio met their rivals Internacional at Copa Libertadores for the first time in history. The first leg at the Arena do Grêmio ended in controversy as a fight broke out between Grêmio's Pepê and Inter's Moisés which quickly escalated into a full-brawl between the two teams and eight players — three of each team in the field and more two from the bench — were sent off. The match ended on a tie.

=== 2021 crises, relegation and return ===
The 2020 saw a decline on the performance of the team, while they were able to secure the Campeonato Gaúcho, they finished in 6th in the Brasileirão which didn't guarantee their berth to the Libertadores for the first time since 2013, having to play at the qualifying stages. The team later fail to qualify to the 2021 Copa Libertadores after losing to Ecuador's Independiente del Valle. The defeat ended up causing the resignation of Renato Portaluppi, who had worked at the club for almost five years.

In 2021, Grêmio was elected the best club in South America of the decade, between 2011 and 2020, in a survey carried out by the International Federation of Football History & Statistics (IFFHS). The ranking took into account the points scored by clubs in the organization's Club World Ranking each year.

Portaluppi's replacement was Tiago Nunes, with whom Grêmio qualified for the next phase of the Copa Sudamericana and won the Campeonato Gaúcho in the final played against Internacional. However, the COVID-19 pandemic caused various infections among the squad, which combined with a series of expensive yet supbar hirings, lack organization at the football department (previously heavily depedent on Renato Portaluppi's decisions), as well as other factors resulted in a weak performance at the 2021 Campeonato Brasileiro, getting just two points from seven games and dropping to bottom of the league table. Nunes was fired and replaced with Luiz Felipe Scolari, in turn, also failed to lead the club out of the relegation zone and ended up leaving by mutual agreement after three months of work. Vagner Mancini, then America Mineiro coach, was hired for his place in October. Without achieving results, Grêmio finished the championship relegated for the third time to the Campeonato Brasileiro Série B.

After a weak start in the 2022 Campeonato Gaúcho, Mancini was fired and replaced with Roger Machado, who led to the team to a fifth Gauchão title in sequence after a victory against rival's Internacional in the semi-finals and the finals against Ypiranga. In September Machado was replaced by a returning Renato Portaluppi. The Série B campaign was enough to guarantee access to return to the Série A in 2023.

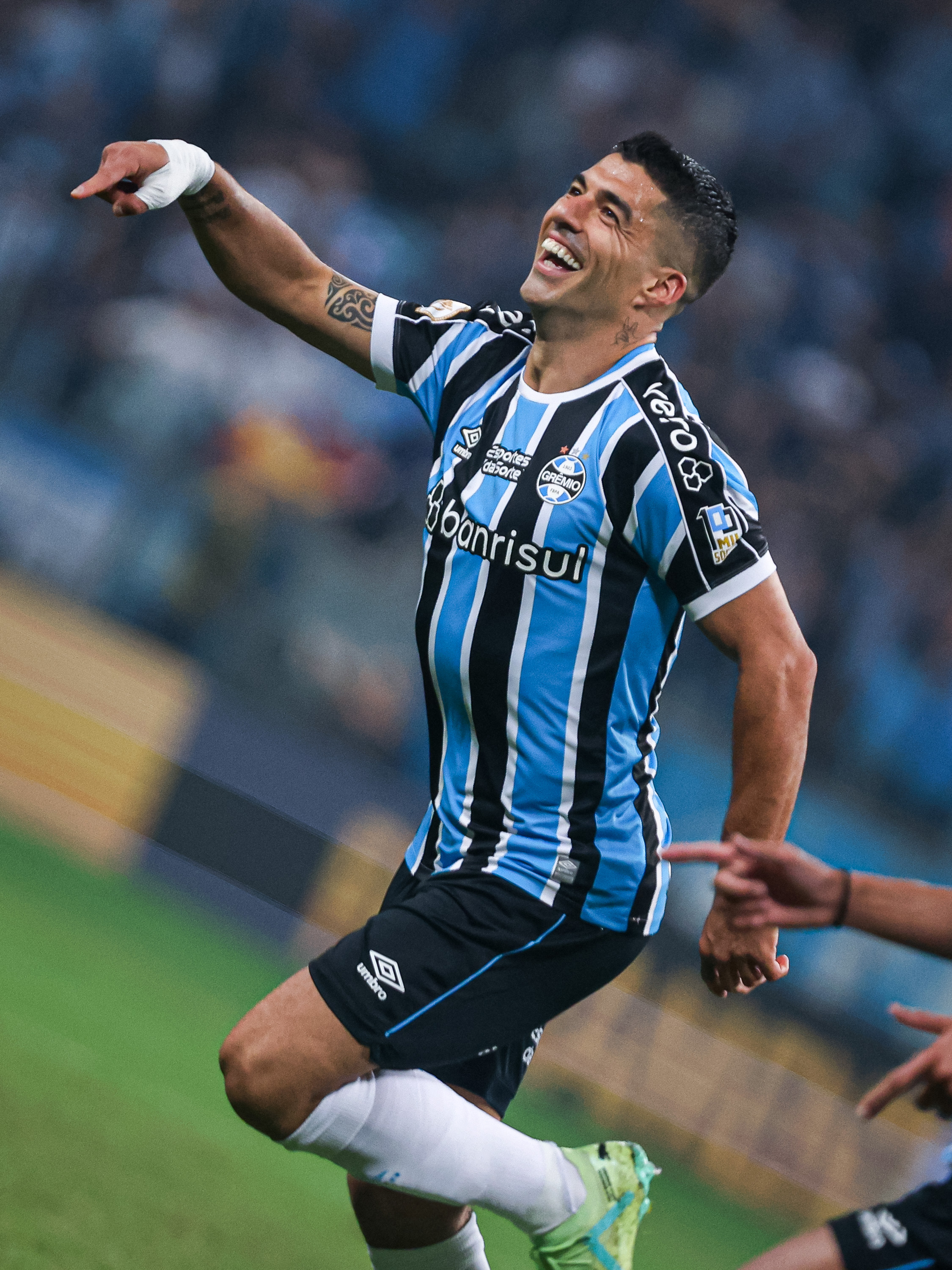
Luis Suárez playing for Grêmio in 2023

In December 2022, Grêmio announced that Luis Suárez would be joining the club for a two-year contract. The signing drew worldwide attention to the club. Suárez made his debut on 17 January 2023 in a match against São Luiz for the 2023 Recopa Gaúcha. Suárez scored a hat-trick in a 4–1 win. With him on the squad, Grêmio was able to conquer the 2023 Campeonato Gaúcho, the sixth in row. In July, citing knee injuries and pain, Suárez later shortened his contract to only one year with the club. With Suárez, Grêmio achieved 2nd place in the 2023 Campeonato Brasileiro Série A, qualifying the team for a spot on the 2024 Copa Libertadores.

In 2024, Grêmio won 2024 Campeonato Gaúcho for the seventh time in a row, with Renato Gaúcho as a manager.

== Symbols ==
=== Stars ===
According to the club, the gold star represents the victory in the World Club Championship; the silver represents the three South American competition victories; and the bronze one represents the National competitions. There is also a gold star in Grêmio's flag that represents a player, Everaldo, the sole Grêmio player in the 1970 Brazilian World Cup winning team.

=== Flag ===
The first club flag was unveiled by the club during the opening ceremony for the Baixada stadium. At that time, it had a horizontal stripe of blue, black and white, with a medallion on the left top corner. The Brazilian Flag was the inspiration for the Tricolor's standard from 1918 to 1944.

=== Mascot ===
Grêmio's mascot is the Musketeer. The cartoonist Pompeo, drawing for defunct newspaper Folha da Tarde drew a musketeer, inspired by Alexandre Dumas's The Three Musketeers, with the colors of Grêmio to represent the club in 1946. The aim was to use Dumas' musketeers as a symbol of the spirit of unity between players, management and fans, as well as being a symbol of bravery and determination. A banner with the slogan "With Grêmio wherever Grêmio is". (Portuguese: Com o Grêmio onde estiver o Grêmio) with an image of Pompeo's musketeer appeared in the same year at the ´Estádio da Baixada, as well as the club's internal newspaper adopted the name "O Mosqueteiro".

On 1 December 2023, Grêmio unveiled a new mascot, "Black Arrow" (Portuguese: Flecha Negra), inspired by club legend Tarciso Flecha Negra. However, Flecha Negra wasn't made to replace the Musketeer, but rather to appear alongside him.

=== Anthem ===
Grêmio's anthem is one of the most critically acclaimed in all of Brazilian football, other than the anthems of the clubs from Rio de Janeiro (all composed by Lamartine Babo), it is the only football anthem composed by a renowned composer, Lupicínio Rodrigues. Featuring a vivid melody in the style of a march, the anthem features the famous verses: Até a pé nós iremos / para o que der e vier / mas o certo é que nós estaremos / com o Grêmio onde o Grêmio estiver (Even on foot we will go / against all obstacles / but we sure will be / with Grêmio wherever Grêmio may be). Grêmio supporters boast that Grêmio, as the anthem hints, has never played without supporters anywhere in the world.

Eurico Lara, a goalkeeper who played for the club in the 1920s and in the 1930s, is mentioned in the anthem, where he is called the immortal idol (or craque imortal, in Portuguese).

== Team kit ==
Grêmio tricolour scheme is made up of blue, black, and white, an unusual colour combination for football shirts. The first Grêmio kit was inspired by English club Exeter City. At the time, the original kit included a black cap, striped shirt in blue and havana (a variation of brown), white tie, white shorts, and black socks. Subsequently, the uniform was changed to blue and black due to the lack of havana fabric. Soon after, vertical white stripes were included in the kit creating a pattern that is used to the present day. Because of this pattern, Grêmio is commonly referred as the "Tricolor". The Grêmio colors are set in the club statute as so;

- Home colors – vertical stripes of light blue and black, with white piping;
- Away colors – white with blue and black detail;
- Alternative colors – dark blue or blue with white details.

=== Kit evolution ===
Grêmio kits throughout its history:

1903	1904	1917	1920	1925	1926	1928–present

== Sponsorship ==
Product	Enterprise
Sports equipment	(United States) New Balance
Bank	(Brazil) Banrisul
Health insurance	(Brazil) Unimed
Department store	(Brazil) Havan
Bread industry	(Brazil) Marquespan
Paint industry	(Brazil) Tintas Coral
Brewing industry	(Brazil) Brahma
Drinks delivery	(Brazil) Zé Delivery
Beverage corporation	(United States) Pepsi
Audio equipment manufacturer	(United States) JBL

It was in the early 1980s that Grêmio received its first official sponsor, with the Brazilian Olympikus providing sports equipment. The partnership lasted until early 1983, when, on account of the brilliant moment that had been living in their history, the Grêmio has signed a contract with a German Adidas to supply sports material. However, the partnership was short-lived, as in 1985, with the end of the contract with Adidas, a new supplier emerged, returning to the national level with Penalty.

In 1987, for the first time in its history the Grêmio signed a sponsorship agreement for stamping the shirt, with Coca-Cola. This turn in their campaigns unprecedentedly exchanged their traditional red logo for black, because this color belongs to Internacional, its biggest rival, and it was vetoed by Grêmio.

Sponsorship of Penalty and Coca-Cola persisted with Grêmio for nearly a decade until, in 1995, the soft drink brand left the main sponsor of the shirts, which was assumed by Tintas Renner, a paint manufacturer, until 1997. In 1998, General Motors assumed this position, exposing numerous names of vehicles throughout the partnership. At the beginning of the 21st century, Penalty left the club, with the Italian Kappa providing sports equipment.

In 2001, for the payment of debts, Grêmio closed an agreement with the state government of Rio Grande do Sul, exposing Banrisul banking mark on his shirt. However, after payment, it was Banrisul who assumed the payments and became the master sponsor of the club. In 2005 the contract with Kappa came to an end, after this, kits were the responsibility of another German in club history, Puma. Also from this era, Grêmio opened more spaces for smaller sponsors, with the first being Tramontina, Unimed, TIM and the return of Coca-Cola. In 2011, once again changing the supplier of sports equipment occurs, this time taking the Brazilian Topper, under the value of €4.8 million per season, which operates in the South American market, with a contract until the end of 2014. Beginning in 2015 season, the British company Umbro supplied sports equipment of Grêmio, paying the value of €6 million per year. In 2026 onwards, Grêmio switched its sports equipment sponsor with New Balance.

In 2025 Grêmio switched its master sponsor from Banrisul, after more than 24 years, to online sports betting and online gambling platform Alfa in a value of R$ 50 million per year. Grêmio's rival Internacional also adopted the same sponsor on a similar deal. However, Alfa failed to pay its part of the agreement to both clubs. In December 2025, Grêmio terminated its contract with Alfa and started the 2026 season without a master sponsor for the first time since 1987.

== Stadium ==
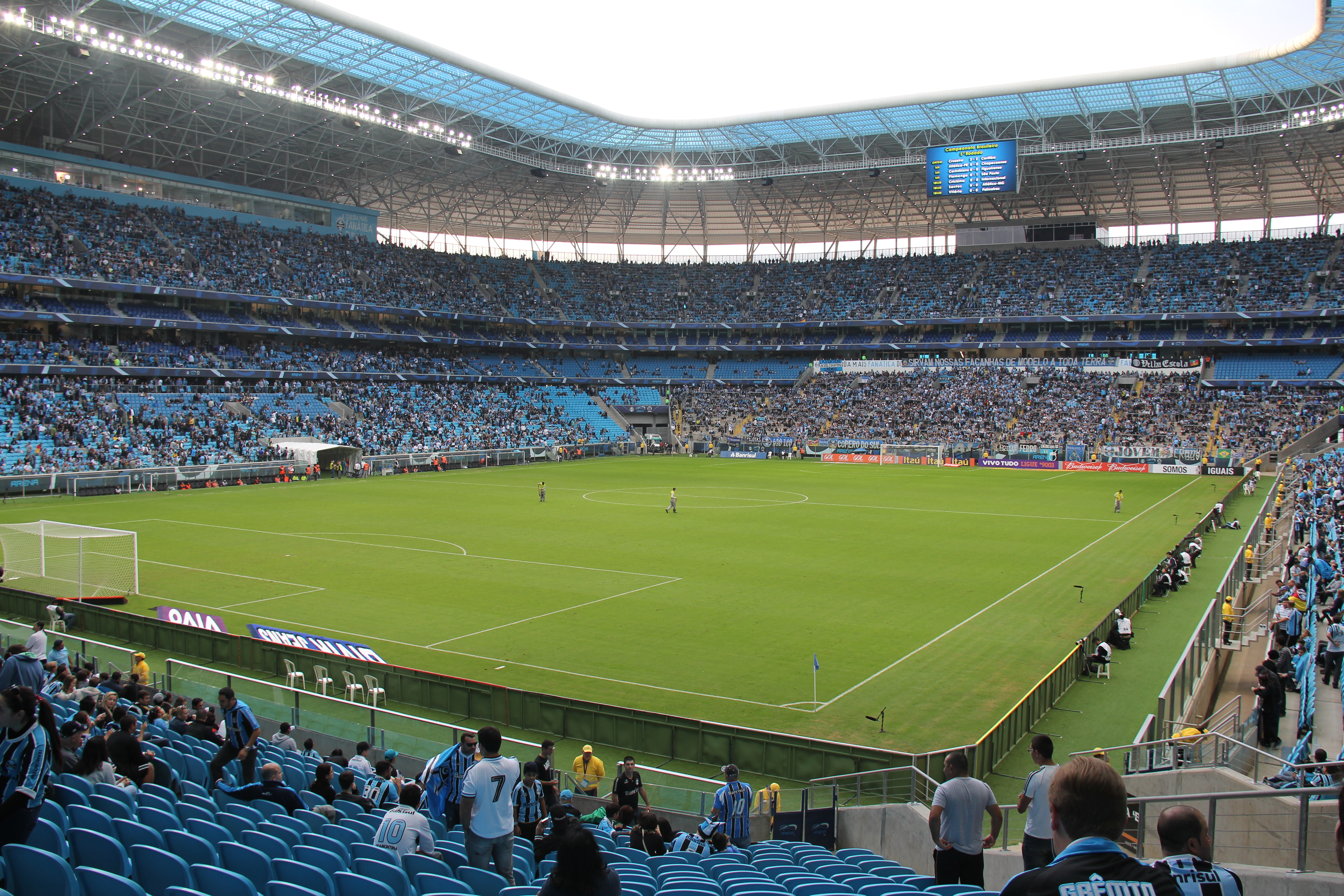
Arena do Grêmio

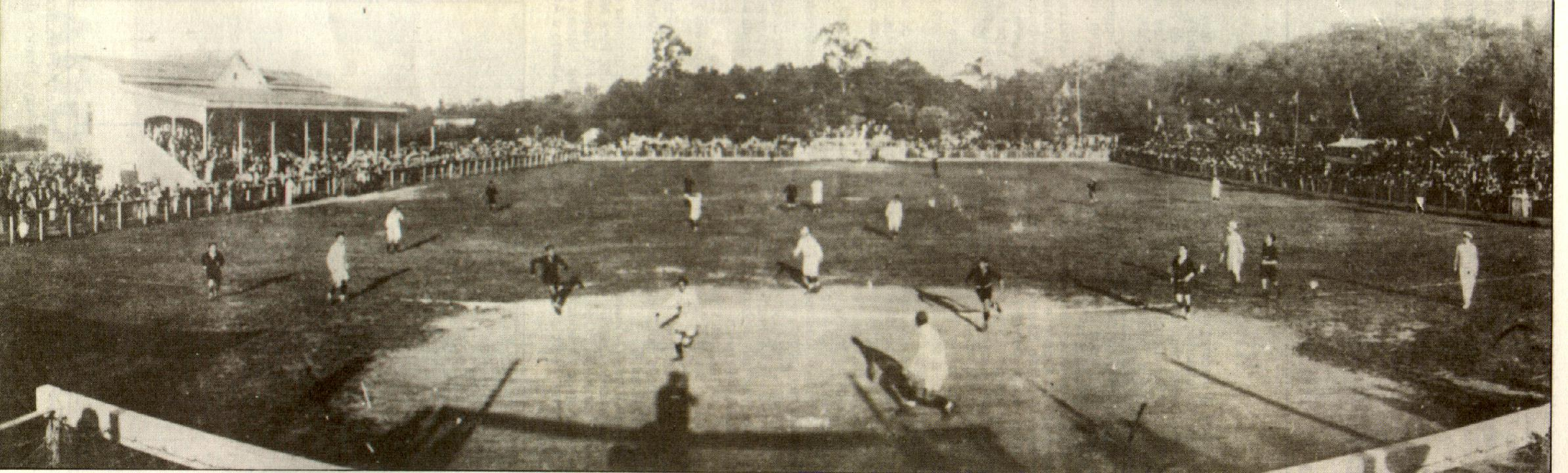
Estádio da Baixada in the 1930s

Grêmio's original stadium was the Estádio da Baixada, built in 1904 at the upper-class neighbourhood of Moinhos de Vento in Porto Alegre. It was made to please the city's growing colony of Germans, who were concentrated in the region. The Estádio da Baixada hosted Grêmio until 1954.

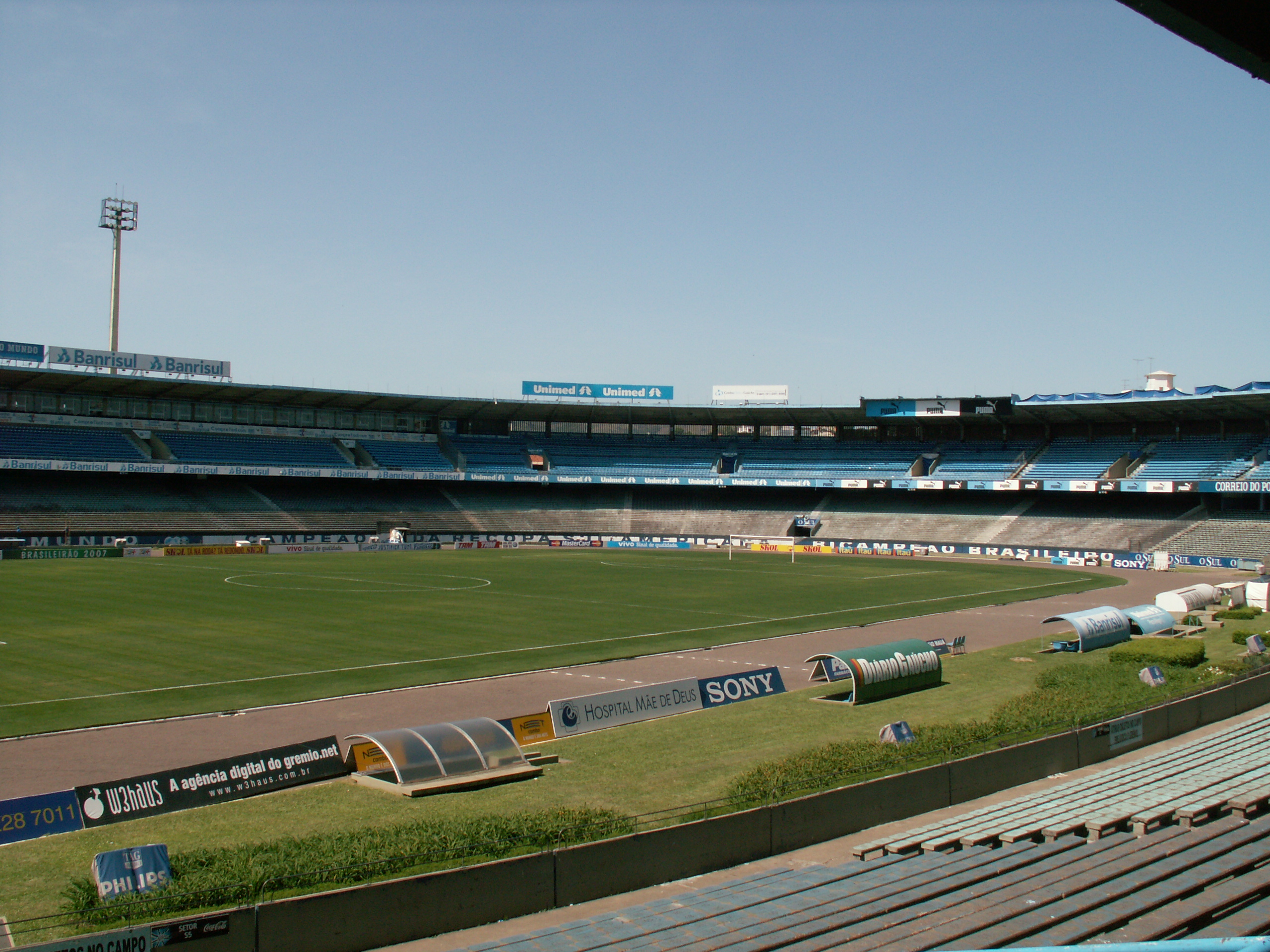
Estádio Olímpico Monumental in 2007

The second stadium was the Estádio Olímpico Monumental. It was inaugurated on 19 September 1954 as Estádio Olímpico, located in the neighbourhood of Azenha. At the time it was the largest private stadium in Brazil. Estádio Olímpico's first game was between Grêmio and Nacional from Uruguay; Grêmio won by a score of 2–0, with both goals scored by Vítor. In 1980 a second tier was added to the Olímpico, and the stadium was renamed the Olímpico Monumental. The first game at the renamed Olímpico Monumental was played on 21 June 1980, when Grêmio beat Vasco da Gama by a score of 1–0. The Olímpico Monumental has an attendance record of 98,421 people for the game against Ponte Preta on 26 April 1981.

By the 2000s, the board of directors start to study what to do with the aging Olímpico, the stadium did not meet the club's expectations, due to the construction's lifetime, high maintenance costs, low comfort standards, low quality of services, poor security, insufficient parking and a highly populated region. The club instead decided to build a new stadium. The project was approved in 2008 and the construction of a new stadium started in September 2010.

In 2012, Grêmio moved into their new stadium, Arena do Grêmio, a big multi-use stadium in Porto Alegre. Its capacity is 55,225 and is one of the most modern venues in South America. The inaugural match in Arena was a friendly against Hamburger SV on 8 December 2012. The attendance record was of 52,223 people at the 2016 Copa do Brasil Finals against Atlético Minero. The Arena also hosted the first leg of the 2017 Copa Libertadores Finals against Lanús.

The club also rents the Estádio Antônio Vieira Ramos in the city of Gravataí, in the metropolitan region of Porto Alegre, as the home stadium for its women's team.

== Training centre ==
The first location for training used by Grêmio was the additional field built next door of Estádio Olímpico Monumental. However, it can not be exactly characterized as a training centre. In 2000 the construction of the first training centre of the club, the CT Hélio Dourado, in Eldorado do Sul, in the metropolitan region of Porto Alegre was completed, but, because of it being located quite far away, it ended up being used for club's Academy.

In 2014, the construction of the new training center of Grêmio, the CT Luiz Carvalho, located next to the Arena do Grêmio, in Porto Alegre was finished. It is adjacent to the Guaíba River, and has beautiful views of the city with the stadium and a cable-stayed bridge in the background.

== Supporters ==
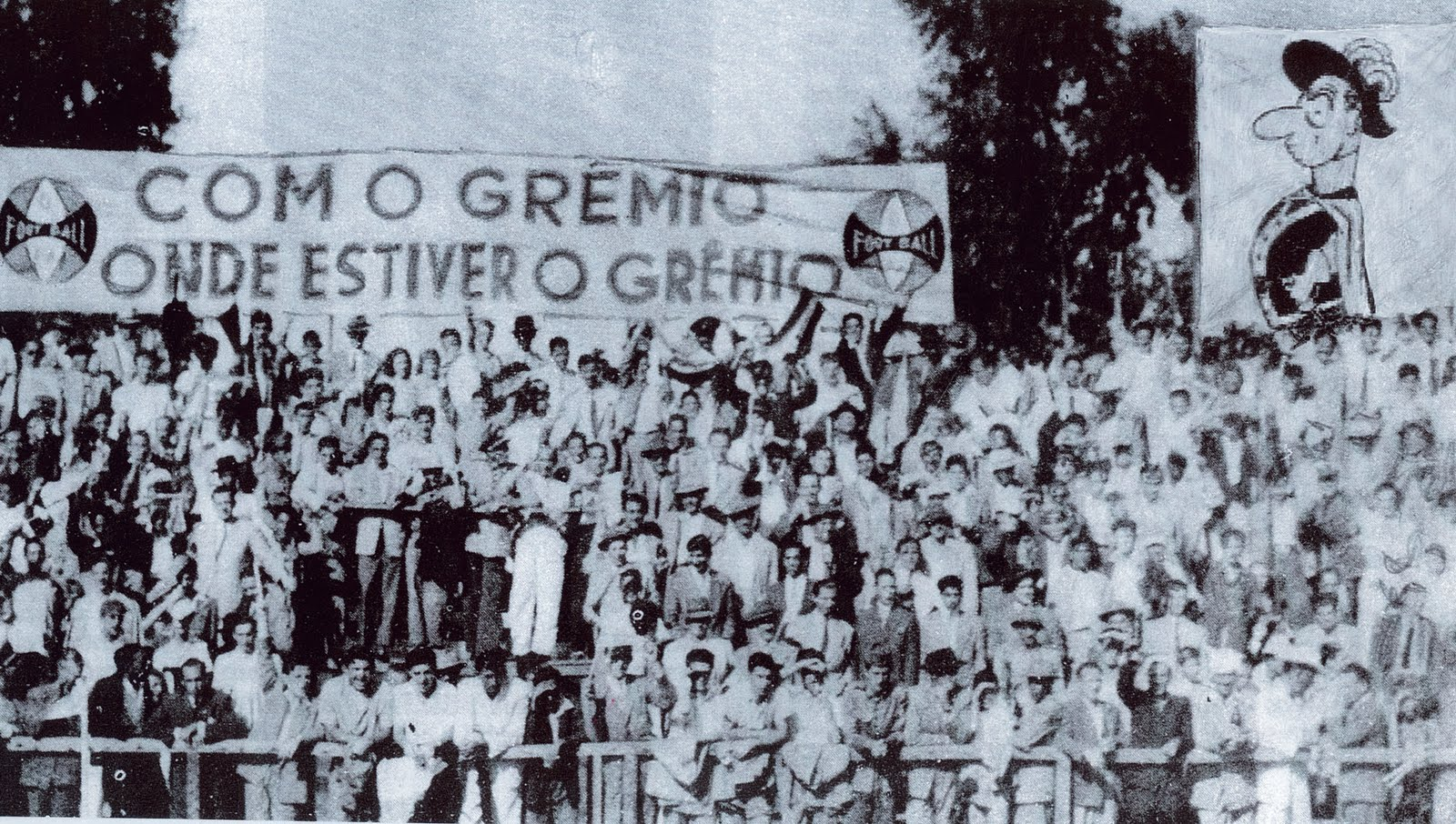
Grêmio fans in 1946, the year the Musketeer appeared as the club's mascot, along with the creation of the slogan "With Grêmio wherever Grêmio is". (Portuguese: Com o Grêmio onde estiver o Grêmio)

Grêmio fans are called "gremistas" or "tricolores". Originally, Grêmio was a club heavily supported by Brazilians of German descent of Rio Grande do Sul. Over time, that distinction has reduced, and today the fan base is very diverse. The club, together with Internacional, divide the population of Rio Grande do Sul; Grêmio is also the most popular club in western Santa Catarina and south-west Paraná. The club has around 8 million fans in the country, meaning that, in terms of ranking, the club is the 6th most supporters in the Brazil. The largest outside the Rio de Janeiro-São Paulo axis. A 2022 research pointed out that Grêmio has the most "loyal" fans in Brazil. The survey that measured the size of the fans in the country identified that 90.6% of Grêmio fans say they support Grêmio exclusively and that only 9.4% of Grêmio fans supported or sympathized with another Brazilian football team. In 2023, Grêmio had more than 100,000 sócios (club-members/associates).

=== Geral do Grêmio ===
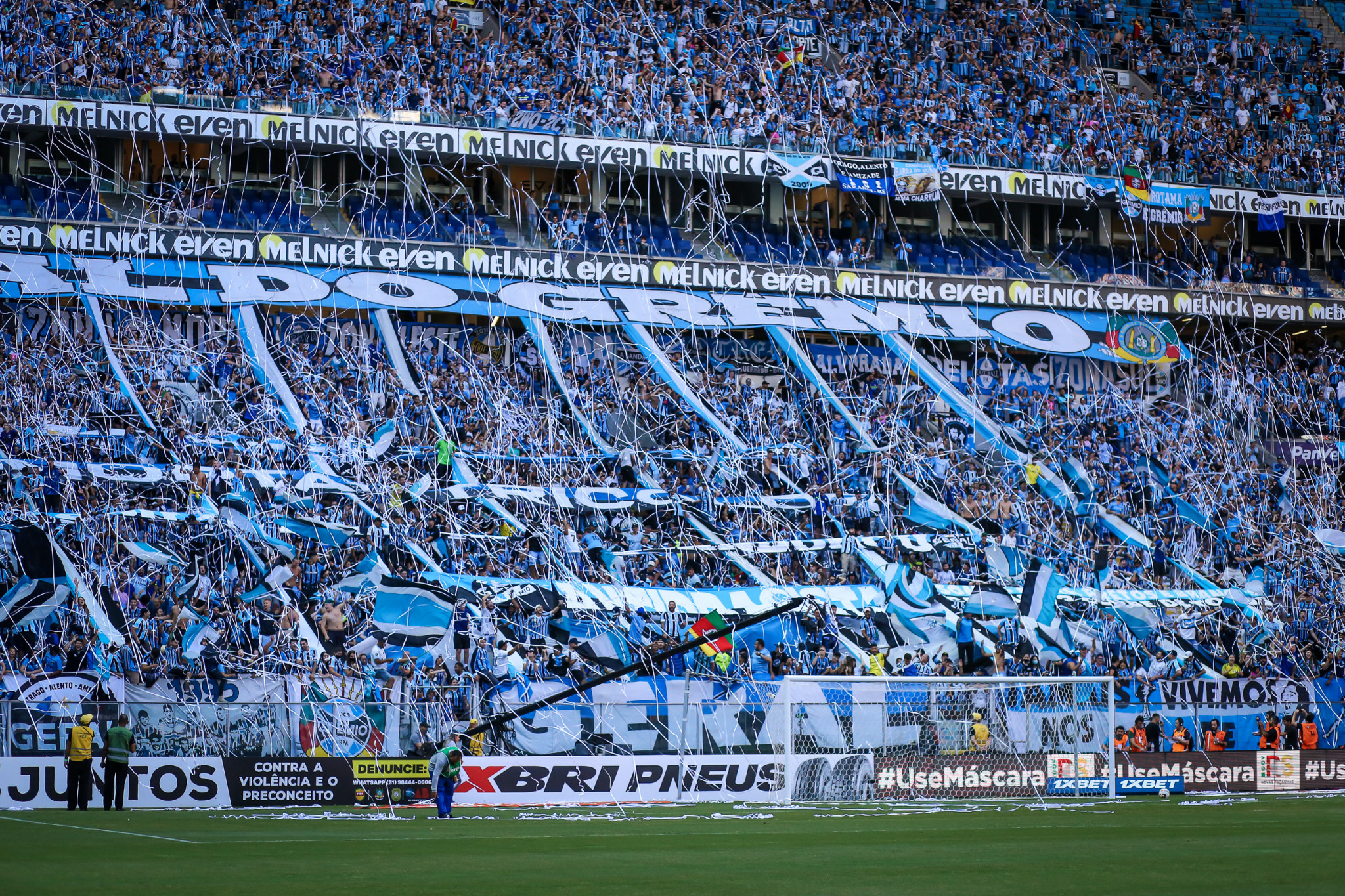
Geral do Grêmio at the northern stand of the Arena do Grêmio

The largest group of Grêmio supporters is Geral do Grêmio, the first and largest Brazilian barra brava, movement similar to European ultras and Brazil's own torcidas organizadas, but with unique characteristics of Latin America. The group was created during the year 2001 with Grêmio fans watching games from the seats behind the southern goal at Estádio Olímpico Monumental (an area of the stands called "Geral", as in "general", where tickets had lower costs). The fans were inspired by neighbouring Argentina's and Uruguay's hinchadas and barras bravas, an experience coming from trips to Copa Libertadores away games and cultural links between Rio Grande do Sul and those countries. As well a period of decadence of Grêmio's traditional Brazilian-style torcidas organizadas in the 1990s. Over the following years, more people joined the movement, and they decided to collectively call themselves by the name of the area from where they watched the games. A unique and traditional feature of the crowd is running down the stand (a movement called the "avalanche"), pressing against the fence when a goal is scored as a way to also embrace the players in celebration.

Being a barra brava, the Geral do Grêmio has differences with the ultras and the torcidas organizadas. They are a free membership group (which means that they do not charge a monthly fee), do not have their own uniforms, nor control over who participates. On games they bring a band consisting of percussion and brass instruments, dictating the rhythm of the chants throughout the game, never stopping or sitting. Banners and flags are exhibited in the length of the sector in which they are located inside the stadium, bringing a unique identity to their supporters. Also, wherever possible, they use flare, smoke bombs, fire extinguishers, among other materials to encourage the team on the field. In the Arena do Grêmio, which opened in December 2012, the lower northern stand was built with no chairs, with the Geral crowd and its "avalanche" celebration in mind. However, in January 2013 on a game against L.D.U. Quito the avalanche resulted on the fence breaking and many fans falling into the trench that separated the stands from the pitch. Safety barriers were installed to make the avalanche impossible.

The Geral enjoys good relationships with some other torcidas organizadas in Brazil, but due to the inspiration on the platinean barra bravas, the Geral has a strong bond with Nacional's La Banda Del Parque. Members of both groups frequently do confraternizations together, and members frequently attend each other's games.

=== Other supporters ===
Other supporters group includes the Torcida Jovem do Grêmio (Young Grêmio supporters), the oldest in operation, founded in 1977 and was considered the main supporters group until the late 1990s; Rasta do Grêmio, Super Raça Gremista, Garra Tricolor, Máfia Tricolor and the Velha Escola (Old School, a schism from the Geral). There are also exclusively female supporters group, such as the Núcleo de Mulheres Gremistas and the Elis Vive Collective.

Another historically important group is Coligay, recognized to be Brazil's first LGBT supporter group. The group was founded in 1977 and suffered of homophobic attacks from rival team's fans and repression by the Brazilian military dictatorship's government. However, the group was relatively accepted by Grêmio's regular fans and supporters as their founding coincided with the end of a long drought and a streak of titles, which gave Goligay the fame of being a "lucky charm". The group closed in 1983 but its legacy has since been adopted by newer fans.

== Rivalries ==
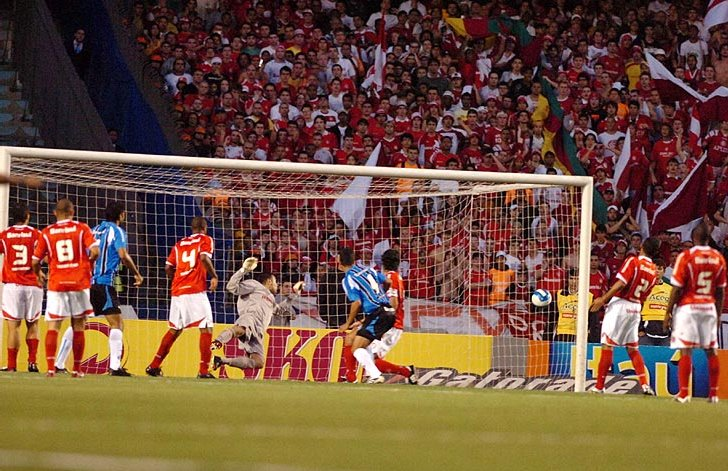
Grenal in 2007

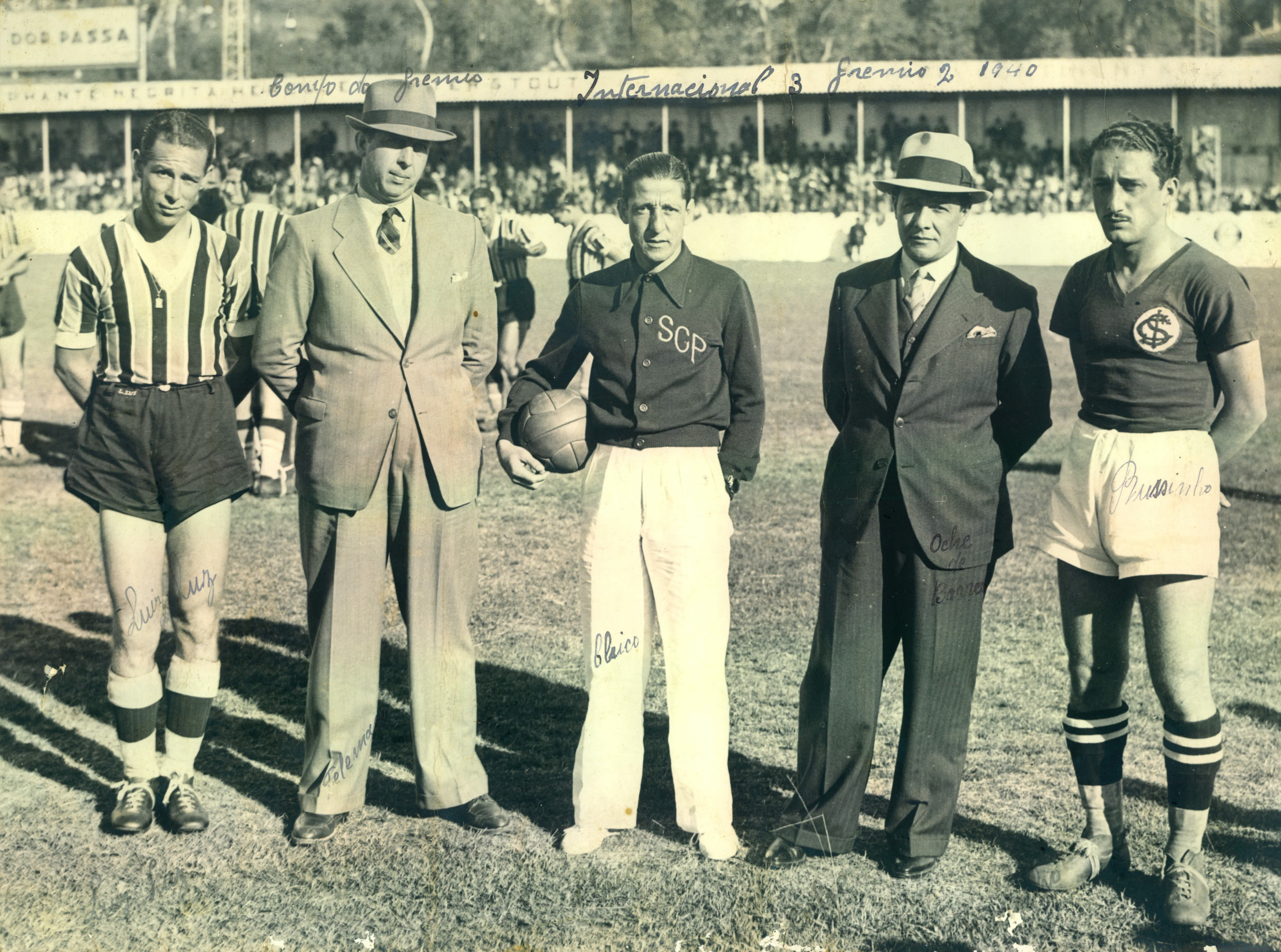
Grenal in 1940 for the Porto Alegre City Championship

=== Grenal ===
As the years went on, Grêmio and another important football club from Porto Alegre, Internacional, started to form a rivalry. Soon the games between these two clubs got their own name, Grenal, and resulted in record attendance. The rivalry divides the state of Rio Grande do Sul and the city of Porto Alegre in half. It is one of the fiercest football rivalries in Brazil, South America and the world. It is accompanied by high levels of emotion, competition and occasional violence.

The first match was held in 1909, Grêmio won the first Grenal in history by the score of 10 to 0. The team led the statistics of Grenais in the first years of dispute until they were surpassed in 1945 by Internacional, which held the advantage in victories until today. In 1935, Eurico Lara, who was Grêmio's goalie, conceded a penalty kick. When the Internacional player was about to kick it, Lara's brother stopped the game and reminded him of his doctor's recommendation that he didn't overexert himself. He didn't listen. Soon the Internacional player took the shot. Lara caught it, but as soon as he did he fell sideways and didn't move. He was substituted after the wondrous save, and Grêmio won the game. But unfortunately he died two months later as a result of the fatigue from that game. Lara has been immortalized in the club anthem.

=== Gre-Ju ===
Gre-Ju is another rivalry of Rio Grande do Sul, between Grêmio and Juventude from Caxias do Sul. For most of its history, the rivalry was one-sided as Juventude was traditionally a weaker team, but it heated up in the 1990s as Juventude grew to be the third powerhouse of the state.

== Players ==
=== First team squad ===
As of 14 September 2026

Note: Flags indicate national team as defined under FIFA eligibility rules; some limited exceptions apply. Players may hold more than one non-FIFA nationality.

No.	Pos.	Nation	Player
1	GK	BRA	Weverton
2	DF	PAR	Fabián Balbuena
3	DF	BRA	Wagner Leonardo
4	DF	ARG	Walter Kannemann (captain)
5	MF	ARG	Juan Nardoni
6	DF	BRA	Gustavo Martins
7	FW	ARG	Cristian Pavon
8	MF	PER	Erick Noriega
9	FW	GHA	Francis Amuzu
10	MF	CRO	Filip Krovinović
11	FW	BRA	Tetê
12	GK	BRA	Gabriel Grando
14	DF	BRA	Marcos Rocha
15	MF	BRA	Danilo Barbosa
17	MF	BRA	Dodi
18	DF	BRA	João Pedro
20	MF	PAR	Mathías Villasanti (vice-captain)

No.	Pos.	Nation	Player
22	FW	DEN	Martin Braithwaite
23	DF	BRA	Marlon (3rd captain)
24	GK	BRA	Thiago Beltrame
27	DF	BRA	Diego Caito (on loan from Goiás)
30	FW	BRA	Matheus Nascimento
31	GK	BRA	Gabriel Menegon
38	DF	BRA	Caio Paulista (on loan from Palmeiras)
39	MF	BRA	Tiago
42	DF	BRA	Athos
43	DF	BRA	Luis Eduardo
47	MF	BRA	Roger
54	DF	BRA	Pedro Gabriel
65	MF	BRA	Riquelme
77	FW	CPV	Jovane Cabral
82	DF	BRA	Wallace
95	FW	BRA	Carlos Vinícius
99	FW	COL	José Enamorado

=== Reserves squad ===
Note: Flags indicate national team as defined under FIFA eligibility rules; some limited exceptions apply. Players may hold more than one non-FIFA nationality.

No.	Pos.	Nation	Player
32	DF	BRA	Vitor Ramon
40	MF	BRA	Jeferson Forneck
48	MF	BRA	João Borne

No.	Pos.	Nation	Player
50	MF	BRA	Zortea
58	DF	BRA	Emanuel

=== Out on loan ===
Note: Flags indicate national team as defined under FIFA eligibility rules; some limited exceptions apply. Players may hold more than one non-FIFA nationality.

No.	Pos.	Nation	Player
—	GK	BRA	Ygor (at Anápolis until 30 November 2026)
—	DF	BRA	João Lucas (at Remo until 31 December 2026)
—	MF	BRA	Camilo (at Chapecoense until 31 December 2026)
—	MF	COL	Miguel Monsalve (at Estudiantes until 30 June 2027)
—	MF	ARG	Leonel Pérez (at Racing until 30 June 2027)

No.	Pos.	Nation	Player
—	MF	BRA	Ronald (at Fortaleza until 30 November 2026)
—	FW	CHI	Alexander Aravena (at Portland Timbers until 31 December 2026)
—	FW	URU	Cristian Olivera (at Bahia until 31 December 2026)
—	FW	BRA	Jardiel (at Novorizontino until 30 November 2026)

== Club officials ==
As of 15 September 2026.

Board members

- President: Odorico Roman
- Vice-president of football: Rafael Lima
- Vice-president: Antônio Dutra Júnior
- Vice-president: Carlos Alberto Vendt Dressler
- Vice-president: Eduardo Schumacher
- Vice-president: Fábio Rigo
- Vice-president: Juliano Franczak "Gaúcho da Geral"
- Vice-president: Paulo Grings
- Chief executive officer (CEO): Alex Leitão
- Football executive: Paulo Pelaipe
- Football manager: Sérgio Helt
- Technical coordinator: Luiz Felipe Scolari
- Administrative supervisor: Luiz Moraes
- Adaptation supervisor: Ruan Noms
- Science, health and performance coordinator: Anderson Donelli

Coaching staff

- Head coach: Renato Portaluppi
- Assistant coach: Alexandre Mendes
- Assistant coach: Vacant
- Fitness coach: Rogerio Dias
- Goalkeeper coach: Mauri Lima
- Head scout: Carlos Silva
- Performance analyst: Gregory Gaspar
- Performance analyst: Paulo Timm
- Market specialist: Antônio Cruz
- Market analyst: Ederson Schwingel
- Market analyst: Guilherme Berlitz
- Market analyst: Henrique Letti
- Development and analysis specialist: Lucas de Oliveira
- Data and project analyst: Artur Sigallis

Medical staff

- Doctor: Jardel Tessari
- Doctor: Lucas Oliboni
- Doctor: Paulo Rabaldo
- Massagist: José Flores
- Massagist: Alexandre Mello
- Massagist: Anderson Meurer
- Massagist: Lucas Cruz
- Physiotherapist: Ingrael do Amaral
- Physiotherapist: Jorge Giongo
- Physiotherapist: William Friderichs
- Physiologist: Giovanni Ramirez
- Nutritionist: Bruno Guerra
- Assistant nutritionist: Eduardo Ettori
- Nurse: Adriano Welter
- Healthcare data analyst: William Borges

Other staff

- Security supervisor: Luiz Fernando Cardoso
- Security: André Trisch
- Security: Cristiano Nunes
- Security: José Nolan Pedroso
- Security: Pedro Carvalho
- Security: Sandro Gonçalves
- Cameraman: Juares Dagort
- Logistics supervisor: Vacant
- Equipment manager: Antônio Marcos
- Equipment manager: Danilo Bueno
- Equipment manager: Diego Simões
- Butler: Paulo Oliveira
- Caretaker: João Moacir da Luz
- Motorist: Antonio Machado
- Knave: Fábio Alves
- Knave: João Brito
- Maintenance technician: Higino Duarte Luciano

=== Managerial history ===
Date	Coach	Titles
1903–04	(Brazil) Oswaldo Siebel	
1904–05	(Brazil) Pedro Huch	
1905–09	(Brazil) Guilherme Kallfelz Filho	
1910	(Brazil) Oswaldo Siebel	
1910–11	(Brazil) Álvaro Brochado	1911 Campeonato Citadino de Porto Alegre
1911	(England) Edwin Cox	
1912	(Brazil) Henrique Sommer	1912 Campeonato Citadino de Porto Alegre
1913–14	(Brazil) Ernesto Hanssen	1913, 1914 Campeonato Citadino de Porto Alegre
1915	(Germany) Bruno Arnold Schuback	1915 Campeonato Citadino de Porto Alegre
1916–17	(Brazil) Ernesto Hanssen	
1918–19	(Brazil) Dorival da Fonseca	1919 Campeonato Citadino de Porto Alegre
1920	(Brazil) Luiz Gomes	1920 Campeonato Citadino de Porto Alegre
1921–26	(Brazil) Ground Committeé	1921, 1922, 1926 Campeonato Gaúcho; 1921, 1922, 1923, 1925, 1926 Campeonato Citadino de Porto Alegre
1927–28	(Brazil) Eurides Guasque de Mesquita	
1929	(Brazil) João Tavares Py	
1929–32	(Brazil) Telêmaco Frazão de Lima	1931, 1932 Campeonato Gaúcho; 1930, 1931, 1932 Campeonato Citadino de Porto Alegre
1933–34	(Brazil) Eurides Guasque de Mesquita	1933 Campeonato Citadino de Porto Alegre
1934	(Brazil) Telêmaco Frazão de Lima	
1935	(Brazil) Eurides Guasque de Mesquita	1935 Campeonato Citadino de Porto Alegre
1936–38	(Brazil) Telêmaco Frazão de Lima	1937, 1938 Campeonato Citadino de Porto Alegre
1939	(Brazil) Oswaldo Rolla	
1939–41	(Brazil) Telêmaco Frazão de Lima	1939 Campeonato Citadino de Porto Alegre
1942	(Brazil) Luiz Luz	
1942	(Uruguay) Ricardo Díez	
1943–45	(Brazil) Telêmaco Frazão de Lima	
1945	(Brazil) Luiz Carvalho	
1945	(Brazil) Telêmaco Frazão de Lima	
1946–47	(Brazil) Otto Bumbel	1946 Campeonato Gaúcho; 1946 Campeonato Citadino de Porto Alegre
1947	(Brazil) Luiz Luz	
1948	(Brazil) Otto Bumbel	
1948	(Brazil) Selviro Rodrigues	
1948–51	(Brazil) Otto Bumbel	1949 Campeonato Gaúcho; 1949 Campeonato Citadino de Porto Alegre
1951	(Argentina) Alfredo González	
1951	(Brazil) Otto Bumbel	
1951–52	(Brazil) Telêmaco Frazão de Lima	
1952	(Brazil) Otacílio dos Santos	
1953	(Brazil) Aparício Viana	
1953–54	(Brazil) Telêmaco Frazão de Lima	
1954	(Hungary) László Székely	
1955–61	(Brazil) Oswaldo Rolla	1956, 1957, 1958, 1959, 1960 Campeonato Gaúcho; 1956, 1957, 1958, 1959, 1960 Campeonato Citadino de Porto Alegre
1961–62	(Brazil) Ênio Rodrigues	1962 Campeonato Sul-Brasileiro
1962–63	(Brazil) Sérgio Moacir	1962, 1963 Campeonato Gaúcho
1964–65	(Brazil) Carlos Froner	1964, 1965 Campeonato Gaúcho; 1964, 1965 Campeonato Citadino de Porto Alegre
1966	(Brazil) Luís Engelke	1966 Campeonato Gaúcho
1967	(Brazil) Carlos Froner	1967 Campeonato Gaúcho
1968–69	(Brazil) Sérgio Moacir	1968 Campeonato Gaúcho
1970	(Brazil) Carlos Froner	
1971–72	(Brazil) Otto Glória	
1972	(Brazil) Daltro Menezes	
1972–73	(Brazil) Milton Kuelle	
1973–74	(Brazil) Carlos Froner	
1974	(Brazil) Sérgio Moacir	
1975	(Brazil) Ênio Andrade	
1976	(Brazil) Oswaldo Rolla	
1976	(Brazil) Paulo Lumumba	
1976–78	(Brazil) Telê Santana	1977 Campeonato Gaúcho
1979	(Brazil) Orlando Fantoni	1979 Campeonato Gaúcho
1980	(Brazil) Oberdan Vilain	
1980	(Brazil) Valdir Espinosa	
1980	(Brazil) Paulinho de Almeida	1980 Campeonato Gaúcho
1981–82	(Brazil) Ênio Andrade	1981 Campeonato Brasileiro Série A
1982	(Brazil) Carlos Castilho	
1983	(Brazil) Valdir Espinosa	1983 Copa Libertadores; 1983 Intercontinental Cup
1984	(Brazil) Carlos Froner	
1984	(Brazil) Chiquinho	
1985	(Brazil) Rubens Minelli	1985 Campeonato Gaúcho
1986	(Brazil) Valdir Espinosa	1986 Campeonato Gaúcho
1986–87	(Brazil) Candinho	
1987	(Uruguay) Juan Martín Mugica	
1987	(Brazil) Luiz Felipe Scolari	1987 Campeonato Gaúcho
1988	(Brazil) Otacílio Gonçalves	1988 Campeonato Gaúcho
1988–1989	(Brazil) Rubens Minelli	
1989	(Brazil) Cláudio Duarte	1989 Copa do Brasil; 1989 Campeonato Gaúcho
1989	(Brazil) Procópio Cardoso	
1990	(Brazil) Paulo Sérgio Poletto	1990 Supercopa do Brasil (first leg)
1990	(Brazil) Evaristo de Macedo	1990 Supercopa do Brasil (second leg); 1990 Campeonato Gaúcho
1991	(Brazil) Cláudio Duarte	
1991	(Brazil) Dino Sani	
1991–92	(Brazil) Valdir Espinosa	
1992	(Brazil) Ernesto Guedes	
1992	(Brazil) Cláudio Garcia	
1993	(Brazil) Sérgio Cosme	
1993	(Brazil) Cassiá	1993 Campeonato Gaúcho
1993–96	(Brazil) Luiz Felipe Scolari	1994 Copa do Brasil; 1995 Sanwa Bank Cup; 1995 Copa Libertadores; 1995, 1996 Campeonato Gaúcho; 1996 Recopa Sudamericana; 1996 Campeonato Brasileiro Série A
1997	(Brazil) Evaristo de Macedo	1997 Copa do Brasil
1997	(Brazil) Hélio dos Anjos	
1997–98	(Brazil) Sebastião Lazaroni	
1998	(Brazil) Edinho	
1998–99	(Brazil) Celso Roth	1999 Copa Sul; 1999 Campeonato Gaúcho
1999	(Brazil) Cláudio Duarte	
2000	(Brazil) Emerson Leão	
2000	(Brazil) Antônio Lopes	
2000	(Brazil) Celso Roth	
2001–03	(Brazil) Tite	2001 Copa do Brasil; 2001 Campeonato Gaúcho
2003	(Uruguay) Darío Pereyra	
2003	(Brazil) Nestor Simionato	
2003–04	(Brazil) Adílson Batista	
2004	(Brazil) José Luiz Plein	
2004	(Brazil) Cuca	
2004	(Brazil) Cláudio Duarte	
2005	(Uruguay) Hugo de León	
2005–07	(Brazil) Mano Menezes	2005 Campeonato Brasileiro Série B 2006, 2007 Campeonato Gaúcho
2008	(Brazil) Vagner Mancini	
2008–09	(Brazil) Celso Roth	
2009	(Brazil) Paulo Autuori	
2010	(Brazil) Silas	2010 Campeonato Gaúcho
2010–11	(Brazil) Renato Portaluppi	
2011	(Brazil) Julinho Camargo	
2011	(Brazil) Celso Roth	
2012	(Brazil) Caio Júnior	
2012–13	(Brazil) Vanderlei Luxemburgo	
2013	(Brazil) Renato Portaluppi	
2014	(Brazil) Enderson Moreira	
2014–15	(Brazil) Luiz Felipe Scolari	
2015–16	(Brazil) Roger Machado	
2016–21	(Brazil) Renato Portaluppi	2016 Copa do Brasil; 2017 Copa Libertadores; 2018 Recopa Sudamericana; 2018, 2019, 2020 Campeonato Gaúcho; 2019 Recopa Gaúcha
2021	(Brazil) Tiago Nunes	2021 Campeonato Gaúcho; 2021 Recopa Gaúcha
2021	(Brazil) Luiz Felipe Scolari	
2021–22	(Brazil) Vagner Mancini	
2022	(Brazil) Roger Machado	2022 Campeonato Gaúcho; 2022 Recopa Gaúcha
2022–24	(Brazil) Renato Portaluppi	2023 Recopa Gaúcha; 2023, 2024 Campeonato Gaúcho
2025	(Bolivia) Gustavo Quinteros	
2025	(Brazil) Mano Menezes	2025 Recopa Gaúcha
2026	(Portugal) Luís Castro	2026 Campeonato Gaúcho
2026–	(Brazil) Renato Portaluppi	

== Honours ==
=== Official tournaments ===
Worldwide
Competitions	Titles	Seasons
Intercontinental Cup	1	1983
Continental
Competitions	Titles	Seasons
Copa Libertadores	3	1983, 1995, 2017
Recopa Sudamericana	2	1996, 2018
National
Competitions	Titles	Seasons
Campeonato Brasileiro Série A	2	1981, 1996
Copa do Brasil	5	1989, 1994, 1997, 2001, 2016
Supercopa do Brasil	1	1990
Campeonato Brasileiro Série B	1	2005
Regional
Competitions	Titles	Seasons
Copa Sul	1	1999
Campeonato Sul-Brasileiro	1	1962
State
Competitions	Titles	Seasons
Campeonato Gaúcho	44	1921, 1922, 1926, 1931, 1932, 1946, 1949, 1956, 1957, 1958, 1959, 1960, 1962, 1963, 1964, 1965, 1966, 1967, 1968, 1977, 1979, 1980, 1985, 1986, 1987, 1988, 1989, 1990, 1993, 1995, 1996, 1999, 2001, 2006, 2007, 2010, 2018, 2019, 2020, 2021, 2022, 2023, 2024, 2026
Copa FGF	1	2006
Recopa Gaúcha	5	2019, 2021, 2022, 2023, 2025

- record

=== Others tournaments ===
==== International ====
- Sadrep Trophy (1): 1949
- Copa El President of the Republic of Costa Rica (1): 1949
- Jose Gonzalez Artigas Cup (1): 1954
- Athens International Trophy (1): 1961
- Thessaloniki International Trophy (1): 1962
- Rio de la Plata Tournament (1): 1968
- Torneio Internacional de Porto Alegre (1): 1971
- Torneio do Atlântico (1): 1971
- Salvador City Tournament (1): 1972
- Rosario City Tournament (1): 1979
- El Salvador World Cup (1): 1981
- Watchtower Trophy (1): 1981
- Trofeo Ciudad de Valladolid (1): 1981
- Los Angeles Cup (1): 1983
- 'CEL' Trophy (1): 1983
- Troféu Ciudad de Palma de Mallorca (1): 1985
- Feyenoord Tournament (1): 1985
- Philips Cup (1): 1986
- Philips Cup (1): 1987
- Sanwa Bank Cup (1): 1995
- Copa Renner (1): 1996
- Agrupación Peñas Valencianas Trophy (1): 1996
- Troféu Colombino (1): 1997
- New Year's Cup 98-Pepsi Cola (1): 1998
- Hang Ching Cup (1): 1998
- Peace Border Cup (1): 2010

==== National and Inter-state ====
- Taça General Flores da Cunha (1): 1935
- Taça Columbia Pictures (1): 1940
- Taça Correio do Povo (1): 1949
- Copa Tancredo Neves (1): 1960
- Taça Petrobrás (1): 1970
- Troféu Domingos Garcia Filho (1): 1970
- Taça Presidente Médici (1): 1971
- Troféu Osmar Santos (1): 2008
- Troféu João Saldanha (1): 2010

==== State ====
- Taça Fernando Carvalho (1): 2010
- Taça Piratini (1): 2011
- Taça Francisco Novelletto Neto (1): 2020
- Torneio Início do Campeonato Gaúcho (3): 1963, 1965, 1967

==== City ====
- Campeonato Citadino de Porto Alegre (28): 1911, 1912, 1914, 1915, 1919, 1920, 1921, 1922, 1923, 1925, 1926, 1930, 1931, 1932, 1933, 1935, 1937, 1938, 1939, 1946, 1949, 1956, 1957, 1958, 1959, 1960, 1964, 1965
- Torneio Início de Porto Alegre (14): 1922, 1926, 1927, 1931, 1937, 1939, 1946, 1947, 1948, 1949, 1958, 1963, 1965, 1967
- Taça Vereinpreis (3): 1904, 1904, 1905
- Troféu Wanderpreis (8): 1904, 1905*, 1905*, 1906, 1907, 1910, 1911, 1912
- Taça Sportiva (1): 1909
- Taça Rio Branco (3): 1914, 1915, 1916
- Torneio Festival F.C. Porto Alegre (1): 1926
- Torneio Dia do Desporto (4): 1926, 1932, 1935, 1939
- Torneio Congraçamento (Taça Fernando Caldas) (1): 1928
- Torneio de Preparatório de Porto Alegre (1): 1929
- Torneio Doutor João Neves da Fontoura (1): 1930
- Torneio de Encerramento de Porto Alegre (3): 1931, 1932, 1933
- Torneio Aniversario f.c Porto Alegre (1): 1936
- Taça Café Nacional (1): 1938
- Taça 'Dia do Filiado' (1): 1938
- Taça de Portugal (1): 1940
- Campeonato Extra de Porto Alegre (2): 1948, 1949
- Torneio Início Metropolitano (1): 1958

=== Runners-up ===
- FIFA Club World Cup (1): 2017
- Intercontinental Cup (1): 1995
- Copa Libertadores (2): 1984, 2007
- Campeonato Brasileiro Série A (4): 1982, 2008, 2013, 2023
- Copa do Brasil (4): 1991, 1993, 1995, 2020
- Campeonato Brasileiro Série B (1): 2022
- Copa Sul-Minas (1): 2002
- Campeonato Gaúcho (28): 1919, 1920, 1925, 1930, 1933, 1935, 1961, 1969, 1970, 1971, 1972, 1973, 1974, 1975, 1976, 1978, 1981, 1982, 1984, 1991, 1992, 1997, 2000, 2009, 2011, 2014, 2015, 2025
- Recopa Gaúcha (2): 2020, 2024

=== Youth team ===
- Campeonato Brasileiro Sub-23 (1): 2021
- Campeonato Brasileiro Sub-20 (2): 2008, 2009
- Taça Belo Horizonte de Juniores (2): 2008, 2012
- Copa Rio Grande do Sul de Futebol Sub-20 (3): 2008, 2009, 2019
- Copa Santiago de Futebol Juvenil (7): 1995, 1996, 1997, 1998, 2000, 2008, 2019
- Copa Macaé de Juvenis (1): 2004
- Copa Votorantim Sub-15 (2): 2008, 2010

== Other sports honours ==
=== Futsal ===
- Copa Atlântico Sul (1): 1987
- Taça Governador do Estado (RS) (1): 1976
- Campeonato Metropolitano (2): 1973, 1974

=== Football 7 ===
- Liga das Américas (1): 2020
- Campeonato Gaúcho (1): 2020
- Taça Governador (1): 2020

=== Basketball ===
- Campeonato Gaúcho (3): 1934, 1954, 1955

=== Volleyball ===
- Campeonato Gaúcho (2): 1929, 1934
- Campeonato Citadino (6): 1930, 1931, 1932, 1933, 1934, 1935

=== Tennis ===
- Campeonato Gaúcho (1): 1926

=== Table Tennis ===
- Campeonato Citadino (1): 1949

=== Boxing ===
- Campeonato Gaúcho (3): 1949, 1950, 1951

=== Sport of Athletics ===
- Troféu Brasil de Atletismo (2): 1958, 1959
- Campeonato Gaúcho de Atletismo Masculino (16): 1934, 1935, 1936, 1956, 1957, 1958, 1959, 1960, 1961, 1962, 1963, 1964, 1965, 1966, 1967, 1968
- Campeonato Gaúcho de Atletismo Feminino (8): 1951, 1953, 1959, 1960, 1961, 1965, 1966, 1972

== Campeonato Brasileiro record ==
Year	Position	Year	Position	Year	Position	Year	Position	Year	Position	Year	Position
1971	6th	1981	1st	1991	19th ▼	2001	5th	2011	12th	2021	17th ▼
1972	10th	1982	2nd	1992	Série B ▲	2002	3rd	2012	3rd	2022	Série B ▲
1973	5th	1983	14th	1993	11th	2003	20th	2013	2nd	2023	2nd
1974	5th	1984	3rd	1994	11th	2004	24th ▼	2014	7th	2024	14th
1975	14th	1985	18th	1995	15th	2005	Série B ▲	2015	3rd	2025	9th
1976	6th	1986	16th	1996	1st	2006	3rd	2016	9th		
1977	13th	1987	5th	1997	14th	2007	6th	2017	4th		
1978	6th	1988	4th	1998	8th	2008	2nd	2018	4th		
1979	22nd	1989	11th	1999	18th	2009	8th	2019	4th		
1980	6th	1990	3rd	2000	4th	2010	4th	2020	6th		

== See also ==
- Grêmio FBPA (women)
- Grêmio FBPA (youth)
- List of world champion football clubs
