= Luiz Carvalho =

Luiz Carvalho may refer to:

- Luiz Carvalho (footballer) (1907–1985), Brazilian footballer and chairman of Grêmio FBPA
- Luiz Carvalho (swimmer) (born 1962), Brazilian swimmer
