= CT Luiz Carvalho =

Sports training facility of Grêmio FBPA

- Full name: Centro de Treinamento Presidente Luiz Carvalho
- Former names: CT Humaitá
- Location: Porto Alegre, Brazil
- Owner: Grêmio Foot-Ball Porto Alegrense
- Capacity: 300
- Type: Sports training facility

Construction
- Built: 2012–2014
- Opened: June 19, 2014
- Cost: € 3 million
- Architect: PLARQ Arquitetura

Tenant
- Grêmio FBPA

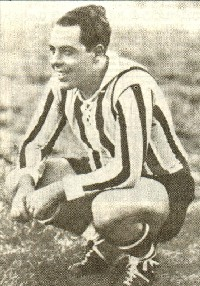
Luiz Carvalho (c 1940)

Centro de Treinamento Presidente Luiz Carvalho (President Luiz Carvalho Training Centre, in English) is the sports training facility of Brazilian football club Grêmio Foot-Ball Porto Alegrense. It is located next to the club stadium, the Arena do Grêmio, in Porto Alegre, Brazil. The name given to the training center is in honor of Luiz Leão de Carvalho, who played for the Grêmio between 1923 and 1940. He was the head coach of the team and president of the club in 1974/1975.

This is the first official training centre of the Grêmio's first team squad, who had been training in a field next to his old stadium, the Estádio Olímpico Monumental. The club also has another training centre, the CT Hélio Dourado, destined for the academy.
