= Sanwa Bank Cup =

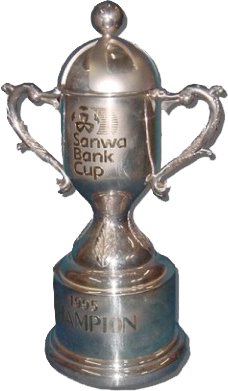
- The trophy awarded to champions
- Organiser(s): J.League
- Founded: 1994
- Abolished: 1997; 29 years ago
- Region: Japan
- Teams: 2

The Sanwa Bank Cup was a football competition unofficial organised by J.League and sponsored by the Sanwa Bank (predecessor of current MUFG Bank). The competition was held between 1994 and 1997 and played two weeks before the opening of J. League (in the case of 1997, one week before the opening match of the J. League Cup).

The teams invited were the J. League champions of the previous season (in the case of 1997, the winners of Suntory Cup '96 J. League Champions' Finals) and the champions of a major foreign league. All editions were held in Japan National Stadium in Tokyo.

== Results ==
Year	Winners	Score	Runner-up	Notes
1994	(Japan) Verdy Kawasaki	2–2 (4–2 p.)	(Argentina) Gimnasia y Esgrima LP	(Note: Gimnasia y Esgrima were invited as the winners of Copa Centenario de la AFA, a tournament held to commemorate the 100th anniversary of the foundation of the Argentine Football Association.)
1995	(Brazil) Grêmio	2–1	(Japan) Verdy Kawasaki	(Note: Held as a part of the series of events to commemorate the 100th anniversary of the conclusion of the Amity, Commerce and Navigation Treaty between Brazil and Japan. Grêmio were invited as the 1994 Copa do Brasil champions.)
1996	(Sweden) IFK Göteborg	1–1 (5–3 p.)	(Japan) Yokohama Marinos	(Note: IFK Göteborg were invited as the 1995 Swedish Champions.)
1997	(Japan) Nagoya Grampus	3–1	(United States) D.C. United	(Note: D.C. United were invited as the 1996 MLS Cup winners.)

== Match details ==
=== 1997 ===
2 March

Nagoya Grampus (Japan)	3–1	(United States) D.C. United
Alexandre Torres 80'; Okayama 85'; Stojković 87'	Report	Iijima 35' (o.g.)

Japan National Stadium, Tokyo
Attendance: 26,842
Referee: Petrovic (Yug)
