= Luiz Luz =

Brazilian footballer

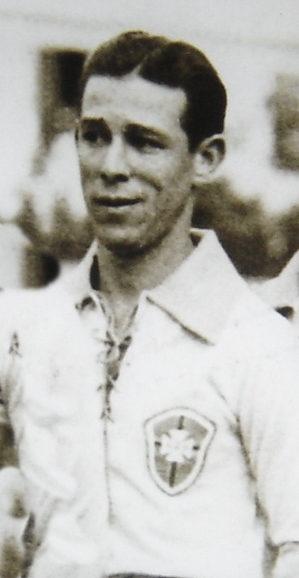

Personal information
- Full name: Luís dos Santos Luz
- Date of birth: 29 November 1909
- Place of birth: Porto Alegre, Brazil
- Date of death: 27 August 1989 (aged 79)
- Position: Defender

Senior career*
Years	Team	Apps	(Gls)
1920–1931	Americano		
1931–1932	Peñarol		
1935–1941	Grêmio		

International career
1934	Brazil		
- * Club domestic league appearances and goals

Luiz dos Santos Luz (29 November 1909 – 27 August 1989) was a Brazilian football player. He played for the Brazil national team.
