= Cláudio Duarte =

Brazilian footballer and manager (born 1950)

Personal information
- Full name: Cláudio Roberto Pires Duarte
- Date of birth: 15 March 1950 (age 76)
- Place of birth: São Jerônimo (RS), Brazil
- Position: Rightback

Senior career*
Years	Team	Apps	(Gls)
1971–1977	Internacional	101	(3)

Managerial career
- 1978: Internacional
- 1980: Santa Cruz
- 1980: Colorado
- 1981: Pinheiros
- 1981–1982: Internacional
- 1983: Guarani
- 1986: Avaí
- 1988: Corinthians
- 1989: Grêmio
- 1991: Grêmio
- 1994–1995: Internacional
- 1996: Criciúma
- 1996: Fluminense
- 1997–1998: Paraná
- 1998: Juventude
- 1999: Gama
- 1999: Grêmio
- 2000: Ceará
- 2001: Internacional
- 2001: Gama
- 2002: Internacional
- 2004: Grêmio
- 2007: Juventude
- 2009: Brasil de Pelotas
- * Club domestic league appearances and goals

Cláudio Roberto Pires Duarte (born 15 March 1950) is a Brazilian former footballer and coach.

Cláudio Duarte is a sports commentator at RBS TV.

He was born in São Jerônimo, and has managed Juventude, Grêmio, Remo, Gama and Internacional among others.

== Titles ==
=== Player ===
With: Internacional

- Campeonato Gaúcho (1971, 1972, 1973, 1974, 1975 and 1976)
- Campeonato Brasileiro (1975 and 1976)

=== Coach ===
- Copa do Brasil Champion: 1989 (Grêmio)
- Torneio Centro-Oeste Runner-up: 2001 (Gama)
- Campeonato Brasiliense Champion 2001 (Gama)
