= Oswaldo Rolla =

Brazilian footballer (1909–1996)

Foguinho
Personal information
- Full name: Oswaldo Azzarini Rolla
- Date of birth: 15 September 1909
- Place of birth: Porto Alegre, Brazil
- Date of death: 27 October 1996 (aged 87)
- Place of death: Porto Alegre, Brazil
- Height: 1.80 m (5 ft 11 in)
- Position: Midfielder

Youth career
- 1925–1928: São José-RS

Senior career*
| Years | Team | Apps | (Gls) |
| 1928–1929 | São José-RS | | |
| 1928 | → Grêmio (loan) | | |
| 1930–1942 | Grêmio | | |
| 1942–1943 | Hercílio Luz | | |

Managerial career
- 1939: Grêmio (caretaker)
- 1942–1943: Grêmio (caretaker)
- 1949–1950: Esperança (Novo Hamburgo)
- 1953–1955: Cruzeiro-RS
- 1955–1961: Grêmio
- 1960: Brazil
- 1961–1964: Cruzeiro-RS
- 1965–1966: Pelotas
- 1967: Aimoré
- 1968: Internacional
- * Club domestic league appearances and goals

Oswaldo Rolla (15 September 1909 – 27 October 1996), also known as Foguinho, was a Brazilian football player and manager, who played as a midfielder.

== Playing career ==
Oswaldo Rolla, also known as Foguinho due to his red hair, began his career at EC São José. In 1928, he was loaned to Grêmio, and participated in the first game in which the club wore the current tricolor shirt with vertical stripes. He had a career with 227 appearances for the club and scored 116 goals. He also practiced rowing, a sport that was widespread in Brazil in the first decades of the 20th century, and as a player he stood out precisely for his physical imposition, a mark that gave the identity of football in Rio Grande do Sul to this day. He has been in the Grêmio FBPA hall of fame since 1996.

== Managerial career ==
Rolla was Grêmio's coach and football director on some occasions, but he definitely began his career as a full-time coach in 1953, at EC Cruzeiro. He quickly returned to Grêmio, where he made 383 appearances as manager. In 1960, with a Gaúcho representation, he was the coach of the Brazilian team in the 1960 Panamerican Championship. He also had spells at EC Pelotas and SC Internacional in 1968.

== Honours ==
=== Player ===
Grêmio

- Campeonato Gaúcho: 1931, 1932
- Campeonato Citadino de Porto Alegre: 1930, 1931, 1932, 1933, 1935, 1937 (AMGEA-E), 1938 (AMGEA-E), 1939

=== Manager ===
Grêmio

- Campeonato Gaúcho: 1956, 1957, 1958, 1959, 1960
- Campeonato Citadino de Porto Alegre: 1956, 1957, 1958, 1959, 1960
