= Luciano Hang =

Brazilian businessman (born 1962)

- Hang in 2025
- Born: 11 October 1962 (age 64); Brusque, Santa Catarina, Brazil
- Other name: Véio da Havan
- Education: Blumenau Regional University
- Occupation: Businessman
- Known for: Co-founding and owning Havan department store chain
- Political party: MDB (1985–2018)
- Spouse: Andrea Benvenutti (m. 1995)
- Children: 3

Luciano Hang (Brazilian Portuguese: [lusiˈɐnu ˈʁɐ̃ɡi]; born 11 October 1962) is a Brazilian billionaire businessman. He co-founded the Havan department store chain and used to own most of the company. Bloomberg LP had described Hang as a supporter of free-market policies and as one of former president Jair Bolsonaro’s most outspoken supporters in the business community.

== Business ==
As of June 2019, Havan had 126 stores in 17 of the country's 26 states, with plans to reach 145 by the end of the year. Hang had also owned hydro-electric power plants, gas stations, a real estate company and an investment fund.

== 2022 coup investigation ==
On 23 August 2022, the Federal Police of Brazil carried out search and seizure warrants at the homes, offices, and other properties of several businessmen, including Hang, José Koury, and José Isaac Peres. The operation was ordered by the Supreme Federal Court as part of an investigation into alleged support for a potential coup in favor of Jair Bolsonaro. The court also ordered the freezing of their bank and social media accounts, required them to give testimony, and authorized access to their financial records.

Hang stated that the measures amounted to political persecution and an attack on their freedom of speech. The case was dismissed due to insufficient evidence..

== Personal life ==
Hang was married to Andrea Benvenutti. They had three children and live in Brusque, Santa Catarina, Brazil.
