= 1920 in Brazilian football =

Football in Brazil
- Season: 1920

The following article presents a summary of the 1920 football (soccer) season in Brazil, which was the 19th season of competitive football in the country.

== Campeonato Paulista ==
Final Standings

Position	Team	Points	Played	Won	Drawn	Lost	For	Against	Difference
1	Palestra Itália-SP	26	16	12	2	2	55	9	46
2	Paulistano	26	16	12	2	2	63	21	42
3	Corinthians	25	16	12	1	3	64	21	43
4	AA São Bento	19	16	9	1	6	34	25	9
5	Ypiranga-SP	15	16	6	3	7	31	31	0
6	Minas Gerais	14	16	6	2	8	47	31	16
7	SC Internacional de São Paulo	11	16	5	1	10	24	57	−33
8	AA das Palmeiras	5	16	2	1	13	17	73	−56
9	Mackenzie-Portuguesa	3	16	1	1	14	10	77	−67
10	Santos	–	–	–	–	–	–	–	–

Santos matches were canceled, as the club abandoned the competition.

Palestra Itália-SP declared as the Campeonato Paulista champions.

== State championship champions ==
State	Champion	State	Champion
Amazonas	Nacional	Paraná	Britânia
Bahia	Ypiranga-BA	Pernambuco	Sport Recife
Ceará	Fortaleza	Rio de Janeiro (DF)	Flamengo
Espírito Santo	Vitória-ES	Rio Grande do Norte	América-RN
Maranhão	Luso Brasileiro	Rio Grande do Sul	Guarany de Bagé
Minas Gerais	América-MG	São Paulo	Palestra Itália-SP
Pará	Paysandu	Sergipe	Cotingüiba
Paraíba	Cabo Branco		

== Brazil national team ==
The following table lists all the games played by the Brazil national football team in official competitions and friendly matches during 1920.

Date	Opposition	Result	Score	Brazil scorers	Competition
September 11, 1920	Chile	W	1–0	Alvariza	South American Championship
September 18, 1920	Uruguay	L	0–6	–	South American Championship
September 25, 1920	Argentina	L	0–2	–	South American Championship
October 6, 1920	Argentina	L	1–3	Castelhano	International Friendly
