= Luiz Carvalho (footballer) =

Brazilian footballer

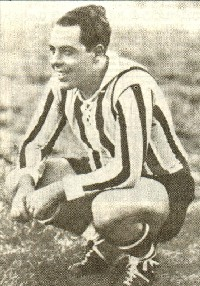

Personal information
- Full name: Luiz Leão de Carvalho
- Date of birth: 1 November 1907
- Place of birth: Cachoeira do Sul, Brazil
- Date of death: 17 January 1985 (aged 77)
- Place of death: Porto Alegre, Brazil
- Position: Forward

Senior career*
Years	Team	Apps	(Gls)
1923–1928	Grêmio		
1928–1929	Botafogo		
1929–1932	Grêmio		
1932	Botafogo		
1932–1934	Grêmio		
1935–1937	Vasco da Gama		
1938–1940	Grêmio		

Managerial career
- 1954–1955: Grêmio
- * Club domestic league appearances and goals as of 18 May 2024

Luiz Leão de Carvalho (1 November 1907 – 17 January 1985), better known as Luiz Carvalho, was a Brazilian professional footballer who played as a forward.

== Career ==
Considered the first great player in the history of Grêmio FBPA, Luiz Carvalho became known at the club as "Rei da Virada", due to the saving goals he scored. He made 206 appearances and scored 171 for the club.

As a player, he also played for Botafogo and Vasco da Gama in Rio de Janeiro, becoming champion in 1936. He later became director of Grêmio FBPA, coach in 1954–1955 and president of the club in 1974–1975. Luiz Carvalho died on 17 January 1985 and gives his name to the current Grêmio CT in the Humaitá neighborhood.

== Honours ==
Grêmio

- Campeonato Gaúcho: 1926, 1931, 1932
- Campeonato Citadino de Porto Alegre: 1923, 1925, 1926, 1930, 1931, 1932, 1933, 1938, 1939

Vasco da Gama

- Campeonato Carioca: 1936
