= Projeto Tóquio =

Portuguese term in Brazilian football

The Projeto Tóquio (Tokyo Project) is a Portuguese language term traditionally used by Brazilian media and clubs' staff and supporters in the context of winning or attempting to win the Copa Libertadores football (soccer) competition and then compete in the FIFA Club World Cup (or, previously in the Intercontinental Cup) in Japan. Thus, when a club gets eliminated from the competition, it is said by the media that the team has postponed its Tokyo Project. The term Projeto Tóquio was first used in 1986, during São Paulo's 1986 Campeonato Brasileiro Série A campaign, as a way to make the club more popular.

== History ==
The project normally starts after the club win the Campeonato Brasileiro Série A or the Copa do Brasil (which qualify their winner to compete in the following year's Copa Libertadores), and the clubs usually spend large sums of money to win the Copa Libertadores. In 1998, Vasco da Gama spent US$10 million to win the competition, and in 1998, Palmeiras, managed by Luiz Felipe Scolari, brought Júnior Baiano among other players, and won the Copa Libertadores 1999. After winning the Copa Libertadores in 1997, Cruzeiro signed some players, such as Bebeto, Gonçalves and Donizete, just to play the match in Japan. Vasco tried to keep the 2000 Série A and 2000 Copa Mercosur squad for the 2001 season, as part of their plan to win the 2001 Copa Libertadores and thus compete in the Intercontinental Cup.

The name refers to the city where the Intercontinental Cup was contested from 1980 to 2001, which was played in Tokyo during that period.
