= Havan (department store) =

Brazilian department store chain

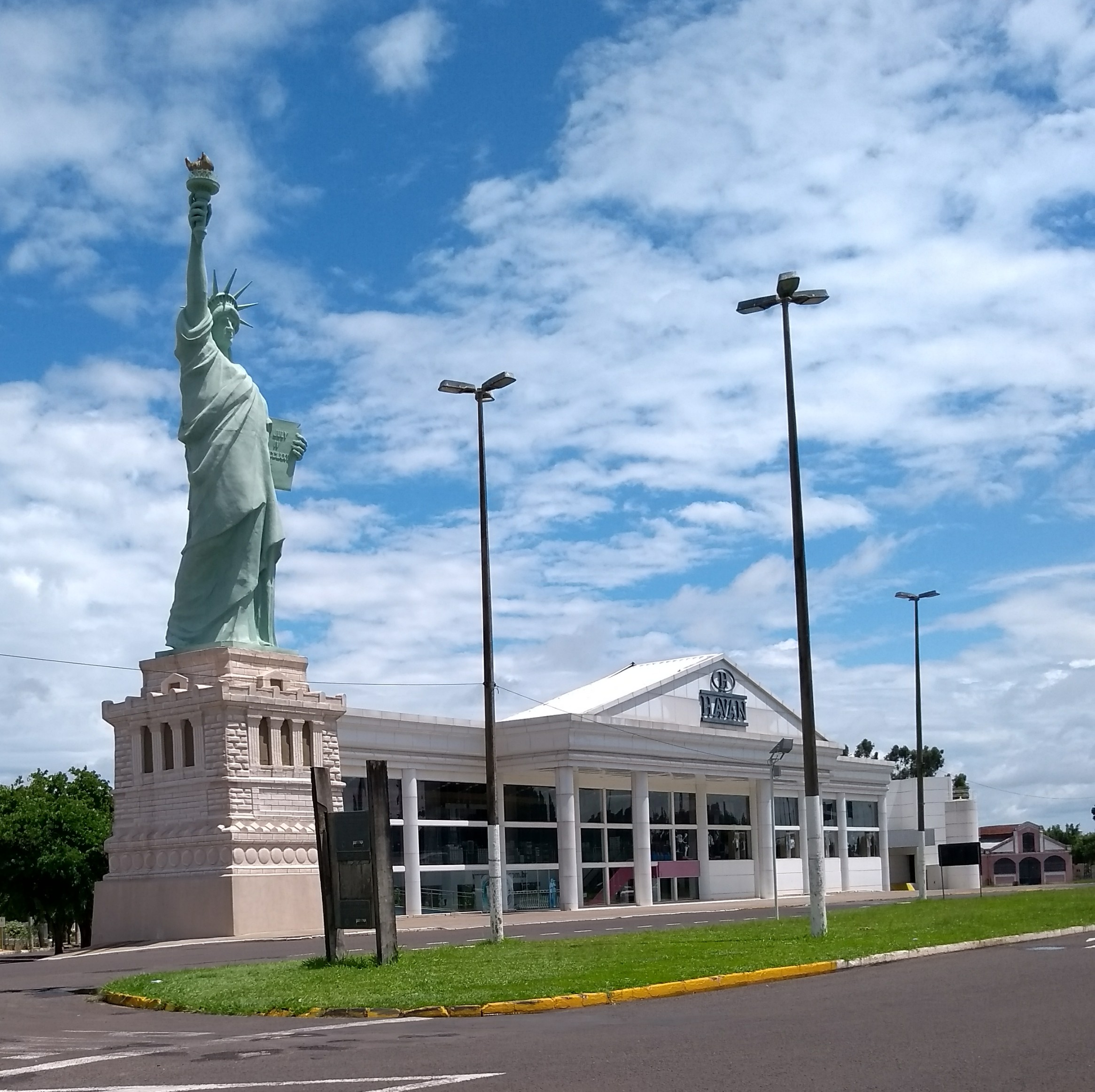
Havan Statue of Liberty in Araçatuba

Havan ([aˈvɐ̃]) is a Brazilian department store chain headquartered in Brusque, Santa Catarina.

Founded in 1986 by Luciano Hang and Vanderlei de Limas, the company is known for its stores with facades similar to Neo-Greek architecture and for the replicas of the Statue of Liberty installed in front of most of its branches. Havan sells national and imported goods wholesale and retail.

== History ==
In 1999, two branches opened in Curitiba. The devaluation of the yuan prompted Havan to reorient itself towards the department store sector. New branches were opened in Florianópolis, Criciúma, Joinville and Balneário Camboriú.

As of 2026, Havan has 201 stores in 25 states and the Federal District.
