= Estádio da Baixada (Porto Alegre) =

Football stadium in Porto Alegre, Brazil

- Fortim da Baixada
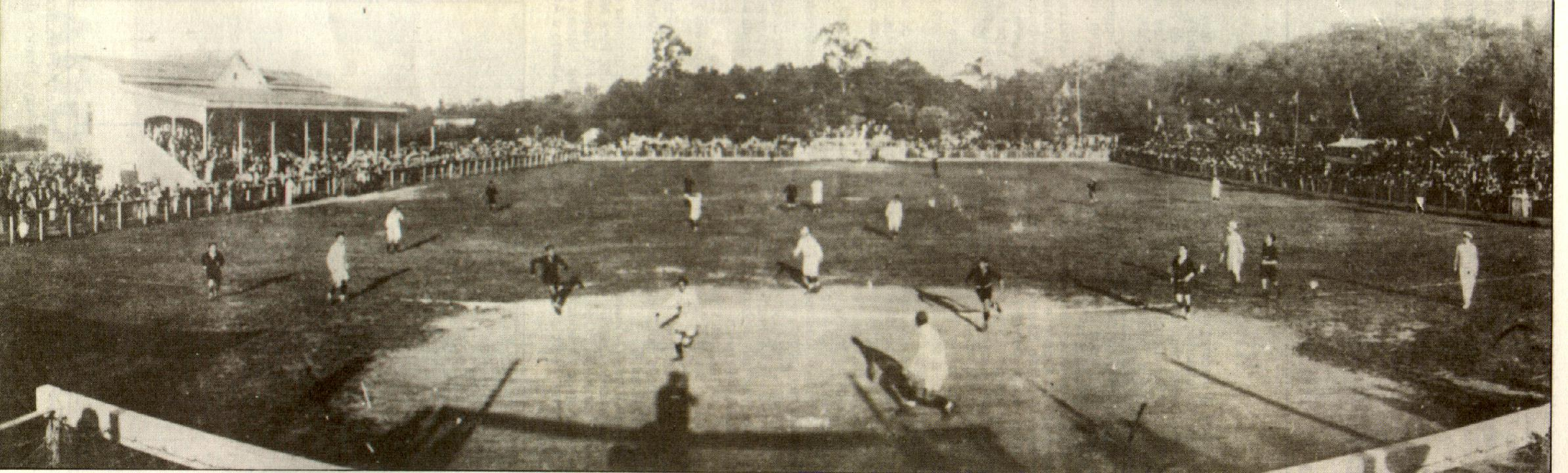
- Full name: Estádio da Baixada
- Location: Porto Alegre, Brazil
- Owner: Grêmio
- Capacity: 15,000

Construction
- Opened: 1904
- Expanded: 1912, 1918 and 1944.
- Closed: 1954

Tenant
- Grêmio (1904–1954)

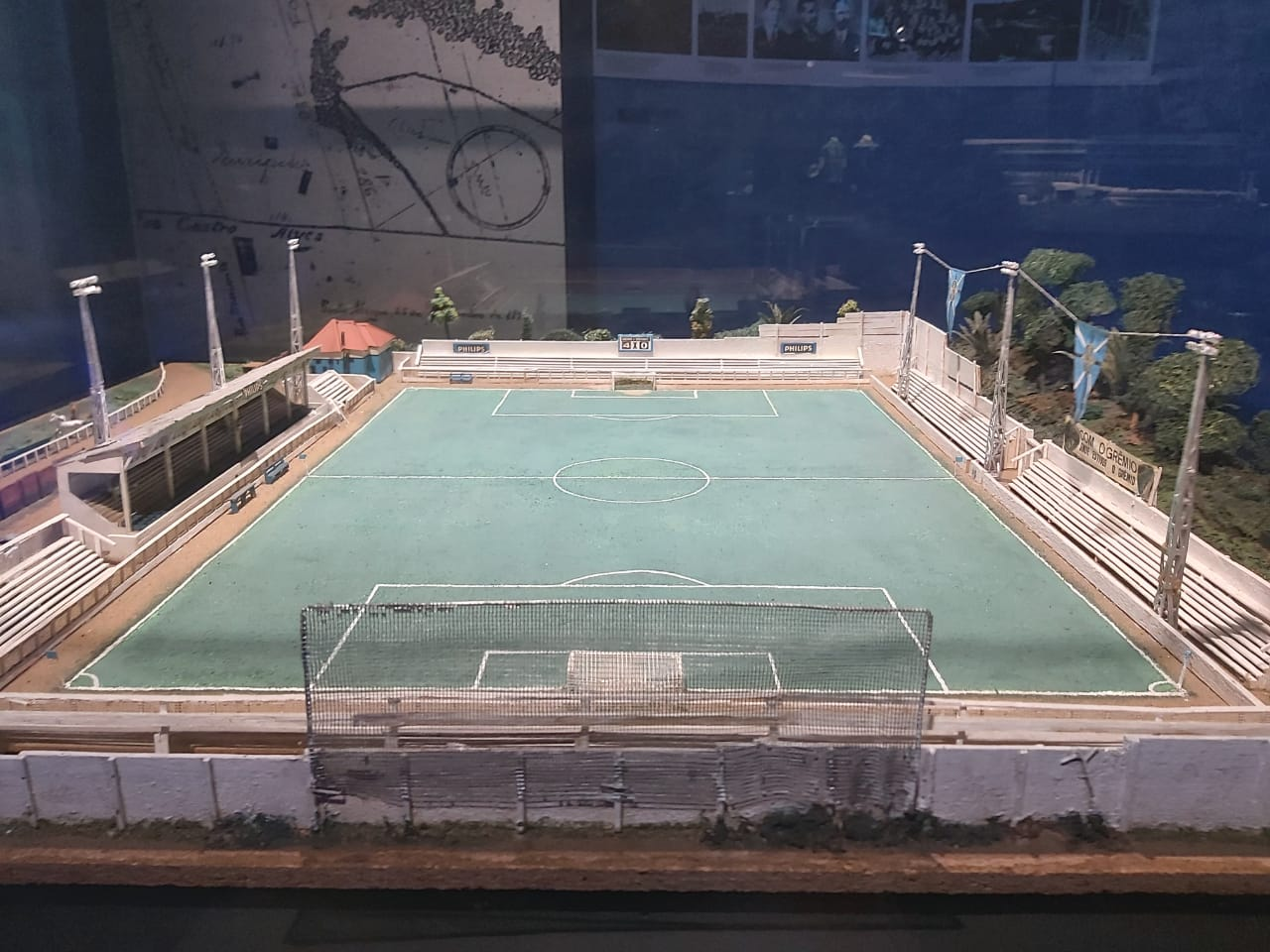
Model of the Estádio da Baixada at Grêmio's museum in the Arena do Grêmio

Estádio da Baixada was a football stadium located in Porto Alegre, Brazil. It was the home ground of Grêmio Foot-Ball Porto Alegrense from 1904 until 1954, when it was replaced by the Estádio Olímpico Monumental. The capacity of the stadium was 15,000 spectators.
