= Esporte Clube Uruguaiana =

Uruguaiana
- Full name: Esporte Clube Uruguaiana
- Nickname(s): Jalde Negro da Baixada
- Founded: May 19, 1912
- Ground: Estádio Felisberto Fagundes Filho, Uruguaiana, Rio Grande do Sul state, Brazil
- Capacity: 1,500
Home colours	Away colours

Esporte Clube Uruguaiana, commonly known as Uruguaiana, is a Brazilian football club based in Uruguaiana, Rio Grande do Sul state.

== History ==
The club was founded on May 19, 1912. They finished in the second place in the Campeonato Gaúcho Second Level in 1966, losing the competition to Passo Fundo-based club Gaúcho.

== Honours ==
=== State ===
- Campeonato Gaúcho Série A2
  - Runners-up (1): 1966

=== City ===
- Campeonato Citadino de Uruguaiana
  - Winners (13): 1913, 1914, 1915, 1920, 1921, 1927, 1934, 1938, 1950, 1953, 1955, 2000, 2010

== Stadium ==
Esporte Clube Uruguaiana play their home games at Estádio Felisberto Fagundes Filho. The stadium has a maximum capacity of 1,500 people.
