= List of Brazilian football transfers winter 2014 =

This is a list of Brazilian football transfers for the 2014 winter transfer window. Only moves featuring at least one Campeonato Brasileiro Série A or Campeonato Brasileiro Série B club are listed. This list also includes transfers which were completed after the end of the summer 2013–14 transfer window and before the end of the 2014 winter window.

The Brazilian winter transfer window opened on 14 July and closed at 23:59 UTC-03:00 on 13 August, being valid for international transfers. Domestic transfers are free to occur throughout the season. In Brazil the winter occurs in half of year, while the summer occurs in the New Year.

== Transfers ==
All players and clubs without a flag are Brazilian. The international transfers for Brazilian clubs are only valid as from the window opening, on 14 July.

Date	Name	Moving from	Moving to	Type	Fee	Note
14 April 2014	Rodriguinho	Corinthians	Grêmio	Loan	Free	
16 April 2014	Marco Antônio	Grêmio	Figueirense	Loan	Free	
17 April 2014	Everaldo	Grêmio	Figueirense	Loan	Free	
18 April 2014	Wesley	Grêmio	Free agent	End of contract	Free	
25 April 2014	(Argentina) Claudio Gaona	Grêmio	Free agent	End of contract	Free	
29 April 2014	Guilherme Biteco	Grêmio	Vasco da Gama	Loan repass	Free	
2 May 2014	Marquinhos Pedroso	Figueirense	Grêmio	Loan	Free	
4 May 2014	Émerson Santos	Grêmio	Santa Cruz	Loan	Free	
7 May 2014	Rodrigo Sabiá	Grêmio	Guaratinguetá	Loan	Free	
14 May 2014	Wendell	Grêmio	(Germany) Bayer Leverkusen	Transfer	€6,500,000	
23 May 2014	Tony	Grêmio	Santa Cruz	Loan	Free	
25 May 2014	Anderson Martins	(Qatar) El Jaish	Corinthians	Loan	Free	
26 May 2014	Fernandinho	Atlético Mineiro	(United Arab Emirates) Al-Jazira	Loan return	Free	
29 May 2014	Maicosuel	(Italy) Udinese	Atlético Mineiro	Transfer	€3,300,000	
30 May 2014	(Argentina) Matías Rodríguez	(Italy) Sampdoria	Grêmio	Loan	Free	
2 June 2014	Marquinhos	Grêmio	Avaí	End of contract	Free	
3 June 2014	Paulinho	Grêmio	Londrina	Loan	Free	
6 June 2014	Gustavo Lima	Grêmio	Afogados da Ingazeira	Loan	Free	
13 June 2014	Adriano	Grêmio	Vitória	Loan	Free	
15 June 2014	Giuliano	(Ukraine) Dnipro Dnipropetrovsk	Grêmio	Transfer	€6,000,000	
16 June 2014	Kléber	Grêmio	Vasco da Gama	Loan	Free	
16 June 2014	Yuri Mamute	Grêmio	Botafogo	Loan	Free	
17 June 2014	Fellipe Bastos	Vasco da Gama	Grêmio	Loan	Free	
19 June 2014	Léo Gago	Grêmio	Bahia	Loan	Free	
23 June 2014	Cleylton	Grêmio	Icasa	Loan	Free	
30 June 2014	Patrick Turuçu	Grêmio	Free agent	End of contract	Free	
1 July 2014	Kaká	(United States) Orlando City	São Paulo	Loan	Free	
1 July 2014	Moisés	Grêmio	Goiás	Loan	Free	
1 July 2014	Matheus Barbosa	Grêmio	Botafogo-SP	Loan	Free	
2 July 2014	(Argentina) Robertino Canavesio	Grêmio	(Argentina) Sarmiento	Loan	Free	
4 July 2014	Natan	Grêmio	ASA	Loan	Free	
10 July 2014	Fernandinho	(United Arab Emirates) Al-Jazira	Grêmio	Transfer	€2,000,000	
28 July 2014	Gerson	Grêmio	(Uruguay) Atenas	Loan	Free	
30 July 2014	Douglas Grolli	Grêmio	Chapecoense	Loan	Free	
1 August 2014	Roberson	Grêmio	Juventude	End of contract	Free	
1 August 2014	Everton Júnior	Grêmio	Atlético Sorocaba	Loan	Free	
4 August 2014	Wangler	Grêmio	Náutico	Loan	Free	
7 August 2014	Robinho	(Italy) Milan	Santos	Loan	Free	
11 August 2014	Gustavo Busatto	Grêmio	Icasa	Loan	Free	
12 August 2014	Diego Souza	(Ukraine) Metalist Kharkiv	Sport Recife	Loan	Free	
12 August 2014	Douglas Santos	(Italy) Udinese	Atlético Mineiro	Loan	Free	
12 August 2014	Ibson	(Italy) Bologna	Sport Recife	Loan	Free	
13 August 2014	Michel Bastos	(United Arab Emirates) Al Ain	São Paulo	Transfer	Free	
13 August 2014	Rafael Carioca	(Russia) Spartak Moscow	Atlético Mineiro	Loan	Free	
