= List of Brazilian football transfers summer 2014–15 =

Brazilian football transfers

This is a list of Brazilian football transfers for the 2014–15 summer transfer window. Only moves featuring at least one Campeonato Brasileiro Série A or Campeonato Brasileiro Série B club are listed. This list includes transfers which were completed after the end of the winter 2014 transfer window, starting from 14 August 2014, until the end of the 2014–15 summer window.

The Brazilian summer transfer window opened on 1 January 2015 and closed on 31 March 2015, being valid for international transfers. Domestic transfers are free to occur throughout the season. In Brazil the winter occurs in half of year, while the summer occurs in the New Year.

== Transfers ==
All players and clubs without a flag are Brazilian. The international transfers for Brazilian clubs are only valid as from the window opening, on 1 January.

| Date | Name | Moving from | Moving to | Type | Fee | Note |
|---|---|---|---|---|---|---|
| 14 August 2014 | Elano | Flamengo | Grêmio | Loan return | Free | |
| 14 August 2014 | Gustavo | Flamengo | Vila Nova | Released | Free | |
| 15 August 2014 | Bruno Correa | (United Arab Emirates) Dubai Club | Botafogo | Loan | Free | |
| 15 August 2014 | (Uruguay) Maxi Rodríguez | Grêmio | Vasco da Gama | Loan | Free | |
| 15 August 2014 | Guilherme Amorim | Grêmio | Londrina | Loan | Free | |
| 16 August 2014 | Souza | Free agent | Criciúma | Transfer | Free | |
| 16 August 2014 | Jackson Caucaia | Ituano | Bragantino | Transfer | Free | |
| 19 August 2014 | (Argentina) Leandro Romagnoli | Bahia | (Argentina) San Lorenzo | Released | Free | |
| 19 August 2014 | Magal | Ponte Preta | Bragantino | Transfer | Free | |
| 19 August 2014 | Renan Oliveira | Atlético Mineiro | América-MG | Loan | Free | |
| 19 August 2014 | Thomás | Flamengo | Ponte Preta | Loan | Free | |
| 19 August 2014 | Sandro Silva | Boa Esporte | Vasco da Gama | Loan return | Free | |
| 19 August 2014 | Cléber Santana | Avaí | Criciúma | Released | Free | |
| 20 August 2014 | Élton | Corinthians | Flamengo | Loan | Free | |
| 20 August 2014 | Tinga | Grêmio | Boa Esporte | Loan | Free | |
| 20 August 2014 | Rafael Thyere | Grêmio | Boa Esporte | Loan | Free | |
| 20 August 2014 | Jota | Grêmio | Boa Esporte | Released | Free | |
| 22 August 2014 | Paulista | Grêmio | Novo Hamburgo | Loan | Free | |
| 22 August 2014 | Elano | Grêmio | Free agent | Released | Free | |
| 25 August 2014 | Emerson Palmieri | Santos | (Italy) Palermo | Loan | Free | |
| 26 August 2014 | Rosinei | Atlético Mineiro | Coritiba | Loan | Free | |
| 27 August 2014 | Douglas | São Paulo | (Spain) Barcelona | Transfer | €4,000,000 | |
| 27 August 2014 | Cléber | Corinthians | (Germany) Hamburger SV | Transfer | €3,100,000 | |
| 27 August 2014 | (Portugal) Fábio Braga | Fluminense | América-RN | Loan | Free | |
| 27 August 2014 | Cristiano | Criciúma | Oeste | Loan | Free | |
| 28 August 2014 | Lucas Evangelista | São Paulo | (Italy) Udinese | Transfer | €4,000,000 | |
| 28 August 2014 | Alessandro | (Japan) Kyoto Sanga | Bahia | Transfer | Free | |
| 28 August 2014 | Gabriel Spessatto | Grêmio | (Italy) Aversa Normanna | Transfer | Free | |
| 30 August 2014 | Adryan | Flamengo | (England) Leeds United | Loan | Free | |
| 30 August 2014 | Raul | Bahia | América-MG | Loan | Free | |
| 1 September 2014 | Dória | Botafogo | (France) Olympique de Marseille | Transfer | €10,000,000 | |
| 1 September 2014 | Otávio | Internacional | (Portugal) Porto | Transfer | €5,000,000 | |
| 1 September 2014 | Bruno Peres | Santos | (Italy) Torino | Transfer | €2,200,000 | |
| 1 September 2014 | Lucas Roggia | Internacional | (Portugal) Beira-Mar | Transfer | Free | |
| 1 September 2014 | David Batista | Sampaio Corrêa | (Portugal) Gil Vicente | Transfer | Free | |
| 2 September 2014 | Edno | Ponte Preta | Vitória | Transfer | Free | |
| 3 September 2014 | Jean Deretti | Grêmio | Joinville | Loan repass | Free | |
| 3 September 2014 | Marquinhos Pedroso | Grêmio | Figueirense | Loan return | Free | |
| 3 September 2014 | Wesley | Figueirense | Free agent | Released | Free | |
| 4 September 2014 | (Cameroon) Joel Tadjo | Londrina | Coritiba | Loan | Free | |
| 4 September 2014 | Gustavo Xuxa | Grêmio | Novo Hamburgo | Loan | Free | |
| 5 September 2014 | Anderson Pico | Free agent | Flamengo | Transfer | Free | |
| 12 September 2014 | Rhodolfo | São Paulo | Grêmio | Transfer | €4,000,000 | |
| 19 September 2014 | Cleylton | Grêmio | Novo Hamburgo | Loan | Free | |
| 23 September 2014 | Felipe Guedes | Grêmio | Free agent | Released | Free | |
| 26 September 2014 | Rondinelly | Grêmio | Luverdense | Loan | Free | |
| 26 September 2014 | Rafael Thyere | Grêmio | Atlético Goianiense | Loan | Free | |
| 1 October 2014 | Rodriguinho | Grêmio | Corinthians | Loan return | Free | |
