= 2014 Grêmio FBPA season =

Grêmio
2014 season
- President: Fábio Koff
- Manager: Enderson Moreira (until July 2014); Luiz Felipe Scolari (from August 2014)
- Stadium: Arena do Grêmio
- Campeonato Brasileiro: 7th
- Copa Libertadores: Round of 16
- Copa do Brasil: Round of 16
- Campeonato Gaúcho: Runner-up
- Top goalscorer: League: Hernán Barcos (14); All: Hernán Barcos (29)
- Highest home attendance: 47,244 (vs. San Lorenzo - 30 April)
- Lowest home attendance: 2,874 (vs. Pelotas - 16 March)
- Average home league attendance: 22,074 (all competitions)
Home colours	Away colours

The 2014 season was Grêmio Foot-Ball Porto Alegrense's 111th season in existence and the club's 9th consecutive season in the top flight of Brazilian football. Grêmio signed Enderson Moreira as the new manager, who left his position at Goiás to join the club.

== Season summary ==
Grêmio started the season using a top squad of its academy, the under-20s team, at the beginning of the Campeonato Gaúcho, because the first team squad had extended its pre-season due to participation in the 2014 Copa Libertadores. Despite starting with the under-20s, Grêmio came with confidence to the final of the Campeonato Gaúcho. However, they were defeated 6–2 on aggregate to their biggest rival, Internacional, as a result of their weakened squad due to players missing that were competing simultaneously in the Copa Libertadores.

In the Copa Libertadores, Grêmio qualified for the round of 16 with the second best overall record amongst all 32 teams, although they still finished second in the second phase of the perceived "group of death". In the last 16 the club's opponents were San Lorenzo, and, with injuries to three of their main players (Luan, Wendell and Rhodolfo), Grêmio was eliminated in a penalty shoot-out.

On 20 April, Grêmio debuted in the 2014 Campeonato Brasileiro Série A against Atlético Paranaense, finishing with a 1–1 draw. In this game and the next, the club could not use its major players, as they were still prioritizing the Libertadores. Before the season stopped for the 2014 FIFA World Cup, in the ninth fixture, Grêmio had 15 points from 27 available, and were in 6th place in the table. During the break, the club strengthened by bringing in four new players for the return sequence of the season, with the main names being Giuliano and Fernandinho. On 16 July, the season resumed with Grêmio drawing 0–0 against Goiás.

On 27 July, following a 2–3 home loss to Coritiba, the Grêmio board of directors decided to part ways with head coach Moreira. Following this, the under-20 team head coach André Jardine was promoted to caretaker until a new head coach was hired. Two days later, Grêmio announced Luiz Felipe Scolari, who had managed the Brazil national team during the 2014 FIFA World Cup, as new head coach. He made his coaching debut for the club against rivals Internacional in the fourteenth fixture of the Série A, which ended in a 0–2 away loss.

In the Copa do Brasil, Grêmio played against Santos in the round of 16. On 28 August in the first leg, Grêmio was defeated 2–0 at home. In this match, there was an incident of racism by a small group of Grêmio supporters against Santos goalkeeper Aranha, which resulted in the deduction of three points in the league for Grêmio, the suspension of the second leg, and, with that, the qualification of Santos to the next round. Grêmio was also fined €18,000.

== Club ==
=== Staff ===
Board members

- President: Fábio Koff
- Vice-president: Adalberto Preis
- Vice-president: Romildo Bolzan Jr.
- Vice-president: Odorico Roman
- Vice-president: Nestor Hein
- Vice-president: Marcos Herrmann
- Vice-president: Renato Moreira
- Director of football: Duda Kroeff
- Executive of football: Rui Costa
- Superintendent: Antônio Carlos Verardi
- Supervisor of football: Luís Vagner Vivian

Coaching staff

- Head coach: Luiz Felipe Scolari
- Assistant coach: Flávio Murtosa
- Assistant coach: Ivo Wortmann
- Permanent assistant coach: André Jardine
- Fitness coach: Fábio Mahseredjian
- Assistant fitness coach: Rogério Dias Luiz
- Assistant fitness coach: Mário Pereira
- Goalkeeper coach: Rogério Godoy
- Performance analyst: Eduardo Cecconi

Medical staff

- Head doctor: Saul Berdichevski
- Assistant head doctor: Fábio Krebs
- Doctor: Márcio Bolzoni
- Doctor: Felipe do Canto
- Doctor: Paulo Rabaldo
- Doctor: Márcio Dornelles
- Physiologist: José Leandro
- Physiologist: Rafael Gobbato
- Physiotherapist: Henrique Valente
- Physiotherapist: Felipe Marques
- Massagist: Marco Zeilmann
- Massagist: José Flores
- Massagist: Anderson Meurer
- Nurse: Adriano Welter
- Nutritionist: Katiuce Borges

Other staff

- Press officer: João Paulo Fontoura
- Cameraman: Juares Dagort
- Equipment manager: Marco Severino
- Equipment manager: Danilo Bueno
- Assistant equipment manager: Antônio Marcos
- Butler: Paulo Oliveira
- Chief security: Luiz Fernando Cardoso
- Security: Cristiano Nunes
- Security: Pedro Carvalho
- Security: André Trisch
- Caretaker: Moacir da Luz
- Motorist: Valdeci Coelho

Last updated: 24 September 2014.
Source: Portal Oficial do Grêmio

=== Kit ===
Supplier: Topper
Sponsor(s): Banrisul / TIM / Unimed / Tramontina

Home	Away	Goalkeeper 1	Goalkeeper 2	Goalkeeper 3	Goalkeeper 4	Training 1	Training 2

This is the last season in which Topper supplies kits for Grêmio, after three years of partnership. For this year, the home kit follows the traditional tricolor design with blue, black and white stripes, this time with blue collars and black accents on the sleeves, inspired by the kit used in 1928. In away kit remained white in focus, however, with a detail in blue and white chest differentiating recent shirts. In 2014 it was not released the third kit. A new feature was presented in training kits, with yellow gaining ground with the traditional blue, in homage to Brazil, which hosts in the second time of the history the FIFA World Cup. Other colors can not be used beyond the three traditional in the match kits.

== Squad information ==
=== First team squad ===
As of 7 December 2014.

Note: Flags indicate national team as defined under FIFA eligibility rules; some limited exceptions apply. Players may hold more than one non-FIFA nationality.

No.	Pos.	Nation	Player
1	GK	BRA	Marcelo Grohe
2	DF	BRA	Pará
3	DF	BRA	Pedro Geromel (on loan from FC Köln)
4	DF	BRA	Rhodolfo (vice-captain)
5	DF	BRA	Werley
6	MF	BRA	Fellipe Bastos (on loan from Vasco da Gama)
7	FW	BRA	Dudu (on loan from Dynamo Kyiv)
8	MF	BRA	Edinho
9	FW	ARG	Hernán Barcos (captain)
10	DF	BRA	Zé Roberto
11	MF	ARG	Alan Ruiz (on loan from San Lorenzo)
12	GK	BRA	Leonardo
15	DF	BRA	Bressan
16	MF	PAR	Cristian Riveros

No.	Pos.	Nation	Player
17	MF	BRA	Ramiro
18	DF	ARG	Matías Rodríguez (on loan from Sampdoria)
19	MF	BRA	Matheus Biteco
20	DF	BRA	Saimon
21	DF	BRA	Breno
23	FW	BRA	Everton
24	GK	BRA	Tiago Machowski
26	FW	BRA	Luan
28	FW	BRA	Lucas Coelho
33	MF	BRA	Walace
40	GK	BRA	Jakson Follmann
77	FW	BRA	Fernandinho
88	MF	BRA	Giuliano
–	DF	BRA	Gabriel (on loan from Lajeadense)

=== Starting XI ===
4–3–3 Formation

No.	Pos.	Nat.	Name	MS	Notes
1	GK	(Brazil)	Marcelo Grohe	55	
2	DF	(Brazil)	Pará	53	
5	DF	(Brazil)	Werley	29	Pedro Geromel has 28 starts.
4	DF	(Brazil)	Rhodolfo	43	
10	DF	(Brazil)	Zé Roberto	36	
8	MF	(Brazil)	Edinho	28	Fellipe Bastos has 20 starts.
17	MF	(Brazil)	Ramiro	52	
16	MF	(Paraguay)	Cristian Riveros	33	
26	FW	(Brazil)	Luan	43	
7	FW	(Brazil)	Dudu	45	
9	FW	(Argentina)	Hernán Barcos	53	

Last updated: 7 December 2014.
Source: Squad statistics and Start formations
Only competitive matches.
Using the most used start formation.
Ordered by position on pitch (from back right to front left).

== Transfers and loans ==
=== Transfers in ===
Date	Position	No.	Player	Moving from	Type	Fee
19 December 2013	MF	8	(Brazil) Edinho	(Brazil) Fluminense	Transfer	Free
27 December 2013	DF	18	(Brazil) Wendell	(Brazil) Londrina	Transfer	€650,000
15 June 2014	MF	88	(Brazil) Giuliano	(Ukraine) Dnipro Dnipropetrovsk	Transfer	€6,000,000
3 July 2014	FW	–	(Brazil) Luis Felippe	(Brazil) Friburguense	Transfer (for Academy)	€130,000
10 July 2014	FW	77	(Brazil) Fernandinho	(United Arab Emirates) Al-Jazira	Transfer	€2,000,000
12 September 2014	DF	4	(Brazil) Rhodolfo	(Brazil) São Paulo	Transfer	€4,000,000
24 September 2014	FW	–	(South Africa) Tyroane Sandows	(Brazil) São Paulo	Transfer (for Academy)	Free

=== Loans in ===
Date	Position	No.	Player	Moving from	Type	Fee
30 December 2013	DF	3	(Brazil) Pedro Geromel	(Germany) FC Köln	Loan	Free
9 January 2014	MF	11	(Argentina) Alan Ruiz	(Argentina) San Lorenzo	Loan	€295,000
11 February 2014	FW	7	(Brazil) Dudu	(Ukraine) Dynamo Kyiv	Loan	€200,000
14 April 2014	MF	27	(Brazil) Rodriguinho	(Brazil) Corinthians	Loan	Free
2 May 2014	DF	36	(Brazil) Marquinhos Pedroso	(Brazil) Figueirense	Loan	Free
30 May 2014	DF	18	(Argentina) Matías Rodríguez	(Italy) Sampdoria	Loan	Free
17 June 2014	MF	6	(Brazil) Fellipe Bastos	(Brazil) Vasco da Gama	Loan	Free
4 September 2014	FW	–	(Brazil) Fred Saraiva	(Brazil) São Paulo-RS	Loan (for Academy)	Free
18 September 2014	MF	–	(Brazil) Denner	(Brazil) Tombense	Loan (for Academy)	Free

=== Transfers out ===
Date	Position	No.	Player	Moving to	Type	Fee
26 December 2013	GK	1	(Brazil) Dida	(Brazil) Internacional	Released	Free
26 December 2013	MF	–	(Brazil) Calyson	(Brazil) Coritiba	Released	Free
31 December 2013	FW	17	(Chile) Eduardo Vargas	(Italy) Napoli	Loan return	Free
31 December 2013	DF	36	(Brazil) Fábio Aurélio	Free agent	Released	Free
10 January 2014	FW	21	(Brazil) Leandro	(Brazil) Palmeiras	Transfer	€5,000,000
12 January 2014	DF	–	(Brazil) Dener	(Brazil) Ituano	Released	Free
19 January 2014	DF	–	(Brazil) Léo Campos	(Brazil) Brasiliense	Released	Free
21 January 2014	MF	–	(Brazil) Willian Magrão	(Brazil) Portuguesa	Released	Free
22 January 2014	DF	13	(Brazil) Alex Telles	(Turkey) Galatasaray	Transfer	€6,150,000
30 January 2014	MF	–	(Brazil) Maylson	(Brazil) Criciúma	Released	Free
8 March 2014	DF	–	(Brazil) Bruno Collaço	(Brazil) Chapecoense	Released	Free
18 April 2014	FW	–	(Brazil) Wesley	Free agent	Released	Free
25 April 2014	MF	–	(Argentina) Claudio Gaona	Free agent	Released	Free
29 April 2014	MF	–	(Brazil) Guilherme Biteco	(Brazil) Vasco da Gama	Loan repass	Free
14 May 2014	DF	18	(Brazil) Wendell	(Germany) Bayer Leverkusen	Transfer	€6,500,000
2 June 2014	MF	–	(Brazil) Marquinhos	(Brazil) Avaí	Released	Free
30 June 2014	DF	–	(Brazil) Patrick Turuçu	Free agent	Released	Free
1 August 2014	FW	–	(Brazil) Roberson	(Brazil) Juventude	Released	Free
20 August 2014	GK	–	(Brazil) Jota	(Brazil) Boa Esporte	Released	Free
22 August 2014	MF	–	(Brazil) Elano	Free agent	Released	Free
28 August 2014	DF	–	(Brazil) Gabriel Spessatto	(Italy) Aversa Normanna	Transfer	Free
3 September 2014	MF	25	(Brazil) Jean Deretti	(Brazil) Joinville	Loan repass	Free
3 September 2014	DF	36	(Brazil) Marquinhos Pedroso	(Brazil) Figueirense	Loan return	Free
23 September 2014	MF	–	(Brazil) Felipe Guedes	Free agent	Released	Free
1 October 2014	MF	27	(Brazil) Rodriguinho	(Brazil) Corinthians	Loan return	Free

=== Loans out ===
Date	Position	No.	Player	Moving to	Type	Fee
4 December 2013	DF	–	(Brazil) Patrick Turuçu	(Brazil) Pelotas	Loan	Free
13 December 2013	DF	–	(Brazil) Gerson	(Brazil) Red Bull Brasil	Loan	Free
18 December 2013	DF	–	(Brazil) Rodrigo Sabiá	(Brazil) Grêmio Osasco Audax	Loan	Free
3 January 2014	MF	–	(Brazil) Felipe Guedes	(Brazil) Pelotas	Loan	Free
9 January 2014	MF	–	(Brazil) Rondinelly	(Brazil) Portuguesa	Loan	Free
10 January 2014	FW	–	(Bolivia) Marcelo Moreno	(Brazil) Cruzeiro	Loan	Free
10 January 2014	FW	–	(Brazil) Júnior Viçosa	(Brazil) Atlético Goianiense	Loan	Free
10 January 2014	DF	–	(Brazil) Douglas Grolli	(Brazil) Londrina	Loan	Free
11 January 2014	FW	–	(Brazil) Bergson	(Brazil) Chapecoense	Loan	Free
13 January 2014	MF	7	(Brazil) Elano	(Brazil) Flamengo	Loan	Free
17 January 2014	DF	–	(Brazil) Tony	(Brazil) Portuguesa	Loan	Free
24 January 2014	MF	–	(Brazil) Felipe Nunes	(Brazil) Portuguesa	Loan	Free
31 January 2014	GK	–	(Brazil) Gustavo Pereira	(Brazil) Santa Rita	Loan	Free
5 February 2014	DF	–	(Brazil) Matheus Barbosa	(Brazil) ABC	Loan	Free
7 February 2014	MF	5	(Brazil) Souza	(Brazil) São Paulo	Loan	Free
7 February 2014	MF	–	(Brazil) Natan	(Brazil) Anápolis	Loan	Free
20 February 2014	DF	–	(Brazil) Cleylton	(Brazil) Cuiabá	Loan	Free
14 March 2014	FW	–	(Brazil) Paulinho	(Brazil) Fortaleza	Loan	Free
16 April 2014	MF	–	(Brazil) Marco Antônio	(Brazil) Figueirense	Loan	Free
17 April 2014	FW	27	(Brazil) Everaldo	(Brazil) Figueirense	Loan	Free
4 May 2014	MF	–	(Brazil) Émerson Santos	(Brazil) Santa Cruz	Loan	Free
7 May 2014	DF	–	(Brazil) Rodrigo Sabiá	(Brazil) Guaratinguetá	Loan	Free
23 May 2014	DF	–	(Brazil) Tony	(Brazil) Santa Cruz	Loan	Free
3 June 2014	FW	–	(Brazil) Paulinho	(Brazil) Londrina	Loan	Free
6 June 2014	GK	–	(Brazil) Gustavo Pereira	(Brazil) Afogados da Ingazeira	Loan	Free
13 June 2014	MF	29	(Brazil) Adriano	(Brazil) Vitória	Loan	Free
16 June 2014	FW	30	(Brazil) Kléber	(Brazil) Vasco da Gama	Loan	Free
16 June 2014	FW	–	(Brazil) Yuri Mamute	(Brazil) Botafogo	Loan	Free
19 June 2014	MF	6	(Brazil) Léo Gago	(Brazil) Bahia	Loan	Free
23 June 2014	DF	–	(Brazil) Cleylton	(Brazil) Icasa	Loan	Free
1 July 2014	DF	13	(Brazil) Moisés	(Brazil) Goiás	Loan	Free
1 July 2014	DF	–	(Brazil) Matheus Barbosa	(Brazil) Botafogo-SP	Loan	Free
2 July 2014	DF	–	(Argentina) Robertino Canavesio	(Argentina) Sarmiento	Loan	Free
4 July 2014	MF	–	(Brazil) Natan	(Brazil) ASA	Loan	Free
28 July 2014	DF	–	(Brazil) Gerson	(Uruguay) Atenas	Loan	Free
30 July 2014	DF	–	(Brazil) Douglas Grolli	(Brazil) Chapecoense	Loan	Free
1 August 2014	MF	–	(Brazil) Everton Júnior	(Brazil) Atlético Sorocaba	Loan	Free
4 August 2014	MF	–	(Brazil) Wangler	(Brazil) Náutico	Loan	Free
11 August 2014	GK	12	(Brazil) Gustavo Busatto	(Brazil) Icasa	Loan	Free
15 August 2014	MF	14	(Uruguay) Maxi Rodríguez	(Brazil) Vasco da Gama	Loan	Free
15 August 2014	MF	32	(Brazil) Guilherme Amorim	(Brazil) Londrina	Loan	Free
20 August 2014	DF	22	(Brazil) Guilherme Tinga	(Brazil) Boa Esporte	Loan	Free
20 August 2014	DF	35	(Brazil) Rafael Thyere	(Brazil) Boa Esporte	Loan	Free
22 August 2014	FW	–	(Brazil) Paulista	(Brazil) Novo Hamburgo	Loan	Free
4 September 2014	FW	–	(Brazil) Gustavo Xuxa	(Brazil) Novo Hamburgo	Loan	Free
19 September 2014	DF	–	(Brazil) Cleylton	(Brazil) Novo Hamburgo	Loan	Free
26 September 2014	MF	–	(Brazil) Rondinelly	(Brazil) Luverdense	Loan	Free
26 September 2014	DF	–	(Brazil) Rafael Thyere	(Brazil) Atlético Goianiense	Loan	Free

=== Overall transfer activity ===
Spending

Transfer: ▼€12,780,000

Loan: ▼€495,000

Total: ▼€13,275,000

Income

Transfer: ▲€17,650,000

Loan: €0

Total: ▲€17,650,000

Expenditure

Transfer: ▲€4,870,000

Loan: ▼€495,000

Total: ▲€4,375,000

== Friendlies ==
=== Pre-season ===
18 January Friendly	Carlos Barbosa XI (Brazil)	0 – 4	(Brazil) Grêmio	Carlos Barbosa, Brazil
16:00 UTC-02:00		Report	Kléber 14', 35'; Maxi Rodríguez 65'; Jean Deretti 84'	Stadium: Estádio do Serrano; Attendance: 3,000

22 January Friendly	Flamengo–RS (Brazil)	0 – 1	(Brazil) Grêmio	Bento Gonçalves, Brazil
16:00 UTC-02:00		Report	Kléber 26' (pen.)

=== Mid-season ===
3 July Friendly	Maringá (Brazil)	0 – 1	(Brazil) Grêmio	Maringá, Brazil
19:30 UTC-03:00		Report	Luan 26'	Stadium: Estádio Willie Davids; Attendance: 3,350; Referee: Paulo Roberto Alves Júnior

6 July Paranaense Champions; Ceremony Friendly	Londrina (Brazil)	0 – 0	(Brazil) Grêmio	Londrina, Brazil
15:00 UTC-03:00		Report		Stadium: Estádio do Café; Attendance: 2,237; Referee: Antônio Denival de Moraes

== Competitions ==
=== Overall ===
Competition	Started round	Current position / round	Final position / round	First match	Last match
Campeonato Gaúcho	Group stage	—	Runner-up	19 January	13 April
Copa Libertadores	Group stage	—	Round of 16	13 February	30 April
Campeonato Brasileiro	—	—	7th	20 April	7 December
Copa do Brasil	Round of 16	—	Round of 16	28 August	28 August

=== Campeonato Gaúcho ===
==== Results summary ====
Overall								Home						Away					
Pld	W	D	L	GF	GA	GD	Pts	W	D	L	GF	GA	GD	W	D	L	GF	GA	GD
19	10	5	4	35	20	+15	35	8	1	1	23	6	+17	2	4	3	12	14	−2

Last updated: 13 April 2014.
Source: Soccerway

==== Group stage ====
Pos	Team	Pld	W	D	L	GF	GA	GD	Pts	Qualification
1	Grêmio (A)	15	8	5	2	28	13	+15	29	Advances to Quarterfinals
2	Caxias (A)	15	8	3	4	23	16	+7	27	Advances to Quarterfinals
3	Novo Hamburgo (A)	15	6	2	7	16	18	−2	20	Advances to Quarterfinals
4	Cruzeiro-RS (A)	15	4	7	4	17	22	−5	19	Advances to Quarterfinals
5	São Paulo (RG)	15	4	5	6	17	20	−3	17	

Source: Globo Esporte
Rules for classification: 1st points; 2nd wins; 3rd goal difference; 4th goals scored; 5th red cards received; 6th yellow cards received; 7th public draw
(A) Advance to a further round

===== Matches =====
19 January 1	São José–RS	1 – 0	Grêmio	Porto Alegre
17:00 UTC-02:00	Jean Silva 33'	Report		Stadium: Estádio Passo d'Areia; Attendance: 823; Referee: Luis Teixeira Rocha

23 January 2	Grêmio	2 – 1	Lajeadense	Porto Alegre
19:30 UTC-02:00	Ewerton 38'; Leandro Porto 88'	Report	Gabriel 77'	Stadium: Arena do Grêmio; Attendance: 3,360; Referee: Diego Almeida Real

26 January 3	Grêmio	4 – 0	Aimoré	Porto Alegre
19:30 UTC-02:00	Barcos 13'; Bressan 22'; Edinho 27'; Kléber 78' (pen.)	Report		Stadium: Arena do Grêmio; Attendance: 10,824; Referee: Jean Pierre Goncalves Lima

29 January 4	Brasil (PE)	1 – 1	Grêmio	Pelotas
22:00 UTC-02:00	Gustavo Papa 5'	Report	Luan 71'	Stadium: Estádio Bento Freitas; Attendance: 5,026; Referee: Gonzalez Todeschini

2 February 5	Juventude	1 – 1	Grêmio	Caxias do Sul
17:00 UTC-02:00	Zulu 13'	Report	Wendell 77'	Stadium: Estádio Alfredo Jaconi; Attendance: 5,936; Referee: Francisco de Paula Dos Santos Silva Neto

5 February 6	Grêmio	1 – 0	Veranópolis	Porto Alegre
19:30 UTC-02:00	Barcos 76'	Report		Stadium: Arena do Grêmio; Attendance: 5,895; Referee: Fabricio Neves Correa

9 February 7	Grêmio	1 – 1	Internacional	Porto Alegre
19:30 UTC-02:00	Barcos 79'	Report	Fabrício 43'	Stadium: Arena do Grêmio; Attendance: 22,888; Referee: Leandro Pedro Vuaden

16 February 8	Esportivo	1 – 3	Grêmio	Bento Gonçalves
16:00 UTC-03:00	Brandão 79'	Report	Maxi Rodríguez 6' (pen.); Werley 38'; Everaldo 49'	Stadium: Montanha dos Vinhedos; Attendance: 1,132; Referee: Márcio Chagas da Silva

19 February 9	Caxias	2 – 3	Grêmio	Caxias do Sul
22:00 UTC-03:00	Julio Madureira 21'; Fredson Baiano 24'	Report	Zé Roberto 18'; Barcos 33', 48'	Stadium: Estádio Centenário; Attendance: 1,738; Referee: Jean Pierre Goncalves Lima

22 February 10	Grêmio	3 – 0	Novo Hamburgo	Porto Alegre
18:30 UTC-03:00	Barcos 6', 53'; Dudu 9'	Report		Stadium: Arena do Grêmio; Attendance: 6,971; Referee: Vinicius Costa da Costa

1 March 11	São Paulo–RS	2 – 1	Grêmio	Rio Grande
16:20 UTC-03:00	Carlos Alberto 59'; Murilo 67' (pen.)	Report	Dudu 87'	Stadium: Aldo Dapuzzo; Attendance: 6,083; Referee: Gonzalez Todeschini

5 March 12	Cruzeiro–RS	0 – 0	Grêmio	Gravataí
22:00 UTC-03:00		Report		Stadium: Antônio Vieira Ramos; Attendance: 1,838; Referee: Daniel Nobre Bins

7 March 13	São Luiz	2 – 2	Grêmio	Ijuí
20:00 UTC-03:00	Aloísio 11'; Geromel 89' (o.g.)	Report	Saimon 2'; Yuri Mamute 36'	Stadium: 19 de Outubro; Attendance: 792; Referee: Vinicius Costa da Costa

9 March 14	Grêmio	3 – 1	Passo Fundo	Porto Alegre
18:30 UTC-03:00	Barcos 6', 47'; Luan 70'	Report	Bruninho 2'	Stadium: Arena do Grêmio; Attendance: 8,998; Referee: Francisco de Paula dos Santos Silva Neto

16 March 15	Grêmio	3 – 0	Pelotas	Porto Alegre
16:00 UTC-03:00	Jean Deretti 61', 78'; Everton 80'	Report		Stadium: Arena do Grêmio; Attendance: 2,874; Referee: Marcio Cristiano Brum Coruja

==== Knockout stage ====
===== Quarter-final =====
23 March Single leg	Grêmio	3 – 0	Juventude	Porto Alegre
16:00 UTC-03:00	Barcos 10', 58', 73'	Report		Stadium: Arena do Grêmio; Attendance: 22,317; Referee: Anderson Daronco

===== Semi-final =====
26 March Single leg	Grêmio	2 – 1	Brasil (PE)	Porto Alegre
19:30 UTC-03:00	Dudu 38'; Luan 48'	Report	Gustavo Papa 84'	Stadium: Arena do Grêmio; Attendance: 20,841; Referee: Fabricio Neves Correa

===== Finals =====
30 March 1st leg	Grêmio	1 – 2	Internacional	Porto Alegre
16:00 UTC-03:00	Barcos 14'	Report	Rafael Moura 53', 72'	Stadium: Arena do Grêmio; Attendance: 37,444; Referee: Leandro Pedro Vuaden

13 April 2nd leg	Internacional	4 – 1 (6 – 2 agg.)	Grêmio	Porto Alegre
16:00 UTC-03:00	D'Alessandro 26'; Alex 49', 57'; Alan Patrick 55' (pen.)	Report	Ernando 66' (o.g.)	Stadium: Centenário; Attendance: 12,839; Referee: Márcio Chagas da Silva

=== Copa Libertadores ===
==== Group stage ====
Pos	Team	Pld	W	D	L	GF	GA	GD	Pts
1	(Brazil) Grêmio	6	4	2	0	8	1	+7	14
2	(Colombia) Atlético Nacional	6	3	1	2	7	8	−1	10
3	(Argentina) Newell's Old Boys	6	2	2	2	10	7	+3	8
4	(Uruguay) Nacional	6	0	1	5	4	13	−9	1

13 February 1	Nacional (Uruguay)	0 – 1	(Brazil) Grêmio	Montevideo, Uruguay
22:15 02:00		Report	Riveros 68'	Stadium: Parque Central; Attendance: 20,000; Referee: Antonio Arias (Colombia)

25 February 2	Grêmio (Brazil)	3 – 0	(Colombia) Atlético Nacional	Porto Alegre, Brazil
22:00 UTC-03:00	Luan 28'; Ramiro 64'; Ruiz 88'	Report		Stadium: Arena do Grêmio; Attendance: 31,586; Referee: Patricio Polic (Chile)

13 March 3	Grêmio (Brazil)	0 – 0	(Argentina) Newell's Old Boys	Porto Alegre, Brazil
21:15 UTC-03:00		Report		Stadium: Arena do Grêmio; Attendance: 43,628; Referee: Carlos Amarilla (Paraguay)

19 March 4	Newell's Old Boys (Argentina)	1 – 1	(Brazil) Grêmio	Rosario, Argentina
22:00 UTC-03:00	Maxi Rodríguez 78'	Report	Rhodolfo 90+1'	Stadium: Estadio Marcelo Bielsa; Referee: Carlos Vera (Ecuador)

2 April 5	Atlético Nacional (Colombia)	0 – 2	(Brazil) Grêmio	Medellín, Colombia
22:000 UTC-05:00		Report	Dudu 52'; Barcos 69'	Stadium: Atanasio Girardot; Referee: Enrique Cáceres (Paraguay)

10 April 6	Grêmio (Brazil)	1 – 0	(Uruguay) Nacional	Porto Alegre, Brazil
22:00 UTC-03:00	Barcos 12' (pen.)	Report		Stadium: Arena do Grêmio; Attendance: 28.302; Referee: Oscar Maldonado (Bolivia)

==== Knockout stage ====
===== Round of 16 =====
23 April 1st leg	San Lorenzo (Argentina)	1 – 0	(Brazil) Grêmio	Buenos Aires, Argentina
22:00 UTC-03:00	Correa 51'	Report		Stadium: El Nuevo Gasómetro; Referee: Enrique Osses (Chile)

30 April 2nd leg	Grêmio (Brazil)	1 – 0 (1 – 1 agg.) (2 – 4 p)	(Argentina) San Lorenzo	Porto Alegre, Brazil
22:00 UTC-03:00	Dudu 83'	Report		Stadium: Arena do Grêmio; Attendance: 44,042; Referee: Roberto Silva (Uruguay)
	Penalties
	Barcos (penalty missed); Riveros (penalty scored); Maxi Rodriguez (penalty missed); Rodriguinho (penalty scored)		(penalty scored) Ortigoza; (penalty scored) Matos; (penalty scored) Blandi; (penalty scored) Buffarini

=== Campeonato Brasileiro ===
==== League table ====
Pos	Team	Pld	W	D	L	GF	GA	GD	Pts	Qualification or relegation
5	Atlético Mineiro	38	17	11	10	51	38	+13	62	2015 Copa Libertadores group stage (Note: Atlético Mineiro has a berth guaranteed to the second stage as the 2014 Copa do Brasil champions.)
6	Fluminense	38	17	10	11	61	42	+19	61	2015 Copa do Brasil round of 16 (Note: Because neither of Brazilian teams won the 2014 Copa Libertadores, an additionally berth to the 2015 Copa do Brasil round of 16 was given to the best non-qualified to 2015 Copa Libertadores, the sixth-placed Fluminense.)
7	Grêmio	38	17	10	11	36	24	+12	61	2015 Copa Sudamericana second stage (Note: Teams that will entry in 2015 Copa Sudamericana if they do not reach 2015 Copa do Brasil round of 16. Also the 2014 Copa Verde champion (Brasília FC) and the 2015 Copa do Nordeste champion (Ceará) have a berth guaranteed.)
8	Atlético Paranaense	38	15	9	14	43	42	+1	54	2015 Copa Sudamericana second stage
9	Santos	38	15	8	15	42	35	+7	53	2015 Copa Sudamericana second stage

Updated to match(es) played on unknown. Source: Soccerway.com
Rules for classification: 1) points; 2) wins; 3) goal difference; 4) goals scored; 5) head-to-head results; 6) least red cards received; 7) least yellow cards received; 8) draw.

==== Results summary ====
Overall								Home						Away					
Pld	W	D	L	GF	GA	GD	Pts	W	D	L	GF	GA	GD	W	D	L	GF	GA	GD
38	17	10	11	36	24	+12	61	12	4	3	24	11	+13	5	6	8	12	13	−1

Last updated: 7 December 2014.
Source: Soccerway.

==== Matches ====
20 April 1	Atlético Paranaense	1 – 0	Grêmio	Florianópolis
16:00 UTC-03:00	Dráusio 15'	Report		Stadium: Orlando Scarpelli; Attendance: 2,495; Referee: Marcelo de Lima Henrique

27 April 2	Grêmio	2 – 1	Atlético Mineiro	Porto Alegre
18:30 UTC-03:00	Ruiz 10'; Lucas Coelho 21'	Report	Fernandinho 84'	Stadium: Arena do Grêmio; Attendance: 9,245; Referee: Wagner Reway

3 May 3	Santos	0 – 0	Grêmio	Santos
18:30 UTC-03:00		Report		Stadium: Vila Belmiro; Attendance: 7,934; Referee: Ricardo Marques Ribeiro

11 May 4	Chapecoense	1 – 2	Grêmio	Chapecó
16:00 UTC-03:00	Tiago Luís 90+1'	Report	Barcos 30', 64'	Stadium: Arena Condá; Attendance: 19,175; Referee: Dewson Fernando Freitas da Silva

18 May 5	Grêmio	1 – 0	Fluminense	Porto Alegre
16:00 UTC-03:00	Rodriguinho 36'	Report		Stadium: Arena do Grêmio; Attendance: 19,328; Referee: Sandro Meira Ricci

21 May 6	Grêmio	2 – 1	Botafogo	Caxias do Sul
22:00 UTC-03:00	Rodriguinho 43'; Maxi Rodríguez 80'	Report	Zeballos 5'	Stadium: Alfredo Jaconi; Attendance: 7,010; Referee: Flávio Rodrigues de Souza

24 May 7	São Paulo	1 – 0	Grêmio	São Paulo
21:00 UTC-03:00	Lucão 60'	Report		Stadium: Morumbi; Attendance: 14,971; Referee: Wilton Pereira Sampaio

28 May 8	Sport	0 – 0	Grêmio	Recife
19:30 UTC-03:00		Report		Stadium: Ilha do Retiro; Attendance: 6,893; Referee: Marcelo de Lima Henrique

1 June 9	Grêmio	0 – 0	Palmeiras	Caxias do Sul
18:30 UTC-03:00		Report		Stadium: Alfredo Jaconi; Attendance: 15,136; Referee: Jaílson Macedo Freitas

16 July 10	Grêmio	0 – 0	Goiás	Porto Alegre
19:30 UTC-03:00		Report		Stadium: Arena do Grêmio; Attendance: 26,166; Referee: Luiz Flávio de Oliveira

19 July 11	Figueirense	0 – 1	Grêmio	Florianópolis
18:30 UTC-03:00	Nirley (yellow card) 61'; Thiago Heleno (red card) 64'	Report	Giuliano 4'; Saimon (yellow card) 37'; Dudu (yellow card) 67'; Marcelo Grohe (yellow card) 79'; Alan Ruiz (yellow card) 87'; Zé Roberto (yellow card) 90+2'; Pedro Geromel (yellow card) 90+3'	Stadium: Orlando Scarpelli; Attendance: 6,754; Referee: Marcelo de Lima Henrique

27 July 12	Grêmio	2 – 3	Coritiba	Porto Alegre
18:30 UTC-03:00	Barcos 57', 65'; Matías Rodríguez (yellow card) 88'	Report	Luccas Claro (yellow card) 42'; Zé Eduardo 49', 73'; Norberto (yellow card) 54'; Alex 90+4'	Stadium: Arena do Grêmio; Attendance: 21,608; Referee: Ricardo Marques Ribeiro

2 August 13	Vitória	2 – 1	Grêmio	Salvador
21:00 UTC-03:00	Caio 59', 77'	Report	Barcos 11'	Stadium: Barradão; Attendance: 11,032; Referee: Sandro Meira Ricci

10 August 14	Internacional	2 – 0	Grêmio	Porto Alegre
16:00 UTC-03:00	Alex (yellow card) 59'; Aránguiz 62'; Winck 85'; Winck (yellow card) 86'; Paulista (yellow card) 90+4'	Report	Rodriguinho (yellow card) 2'; Grohe (yellow card) 27'; Bastos (yellow card) 74'; Ramiro (yellow card) 80'; Pará (yellow card) 90+4'	Stadium: Beira-Rio; Attendance: 37,222; Referee: Anderson Daronco

17 August 15	Grêmio	2 – 0	Criciúma	Porto Alegre
16:00 UTC-03:00	Luan 11' (pen.); Rodríguez (yellow card) 40'; Coelho 49'	Report	Serginho (yellow card) 30'; João Vitor (yellow card) 64'	Stadium: Arena do Grêmio; Attendance: 28,888; Referee: Wilton Pereira Sampaio

21 August 16	Cruzeiro	1 – 0	Grêmio	Belo Horizonte
20:30 UTC-03:00	Dagoberto 49'; Lucas Silva (yellow card) 50'; Henrique (yellow card) 56'; Nílton (yellow card) 73'; Alisson (yellow card) 87'; Dedé (yellow card) 90+3'	Report	Edinho (yellow card) 48'; Dudu (yellow card) 65'; Zé Roberto (yellow card) 76'	Stadium: Mineirão; Attendance: 34,335; Referee: Flávio Rodrigues Guerra

24 August 17	Grêmio	2 – 1	Corinthians	Porto Alegre
16:00 UTC-03:00	Barcos 46', 49'; Rhodolfo (yellow card) 55'; Biteco (yellow card) 81'	Report	Martins (yellow card) 24'; Lodeiro (yellow card) 42'; Elias (yellow card) 55'; Guerrero 62'; Guerrero (red card) 90+2'	Stadium: Arena do Grêmio; Attendance: 32,401; Referee: Héber Roberto Lopes

31 August 18	Grêmio	1 – 0	Bahia	Porto Alegre
18:30 UTC-03:00	Rodríguez (yellow card) 26'; Bastos (yellow card) 37'; Barcos 59'; Barcos (yellow card) 76'; Ramiro (yellow card) 89'	Report	Fahel (yellow card) 4'; Santos (yellow card) 49'; Kieza (yellow card) 61'	Stadium: Arena do Grêmio; Attendance: 14,246; Referee: Péricles Bassols Pegado Cortez

6 September 19	Flamengo	0 – 1	Grêmio	Rio de Janeiro
18:30 UTC-03:00	Amaral (yellow card) 86'	Report	Walace (yellow card) 45+2'; Bastos (yellow card) 87'; Luan 90+1'	Stadium: Maracanã; Attendance: 59,680; Referee: André Luiz de Freitas Castro

10 September 20	Grêmio	1 – 0	Atlético Paranaense	Porto Alegre
19:30 UTC-03:00	Ramiro (yellow card) 64'; Geromel (yellow card) 69'; Barcos 90+2'	Report	Marcos Guilherme (yellow card) 62'; João Paulo (yellow card) 75'; Natanael (yellow card) 90+2'	Stadium: Arena do Grêmio; Attendance: 13,036; Referee: Marcelo de Lima Henrique

14 September 21	Atlético Mineiro	0 – 0	Grêmio	Belo Horizonte
18:30 UTC-03:00	Rocha (yellow card) 69'	Report	Ramiro (yellow card) 21'; Zé Roberto (yellow card) 59'	Stadium: Independência; Attendance: 11,873; Referee: Jaílson Macedo Freitas

18 September 22	Grêmio	0 – 0	Santos	Porto Alegre
20:30 UTC-03:00	Biteco (yellow card) 36'; Ramiro (yellow card) 42'	Report		Stadium: Arena do Grêmio; Attendance: 21,107; Referee: Ricardo Marques Ribeiro

21 September 23	Grêmio	1 – 0	Chapecoense	Porto Alegre
18:30 UTC-03:00	Dudu 8'; Geromel (yellow card) 58'; Biteco (yellow card) 74'	Report	Fabiano (yellow card) 49'; Leandro (yellow card) 84'; Lima (yellow card) 86'; Hyoran (yellow card) 86'	Stadium: Arena do Grêmio; Attendance: 18,499; Referee: André Luiz de Freitas Castro

24 September 24	Fluminense	0 – 0	Grêmio	Rio de Janeiro
22:00 UTC-03:00		Report		Stadium: Maracanã; Attendance: 6,840; Referee: Héber Roberto Lopes

28 September 25	Botafogo	0 – 2	Grêmio	Rio de Janeiro
16:00 UTC-03:00	Airton (yellow card) 30'; Gabriel (yellow card) 51'; Dankler (yellow card) 63'	Report	Dudu (yellow card) 45+1'; Barcos 50', 77'; Walace (yellow card) 73'; Barcos (yellow card) 75'; Alan Ruiz (yellow card) 86'	Stadium: Maracanã; Attendance: 12,498; Referee: Elmo Alves Resende Cunha

4 October 26	Grêmio	0 – 1	São Paulo	Porto Alegre
16:20 UTC-03:00	Pará (yellow card) 31'; Rhodolfo (yellow card) 54'; Bastos (yellow card) 61'; Barcos (yellow card) 66'; Zé Roberto (yellow card) 90+2'	Report	Hudson (yellow card) 15'; Ceni 55' (pen.); Silva (yellow card) 75'; Reinaldo (yellow card) 80'	Stadium: Arena do Grêmio; Attendance: 46,441; Referee: Felipe Gomes da Silva

8 October 27	Grêmio	2 – 0	Sport	Porto Alegre
22:00 UTC-03:00	Geromel (yellow card) 7'; Ruiz 30'; Giuliano (yellow card) 69'; Dudu 76'; Walace (yellow card) 85'	Report	Wendel (yellow card) 79'	Stadium: Arena do Grêmio; Attendance: 13,827; Referee: Marcelo de Lima Henrique

11 October 28	Palmeiras	2 – 1	Grêmio	São Paulo
21:00 UTC-03:00	Lúcio (yellow card) 14'; Mouche 67'; João Pedro 75'	Report	Bastos (yellow card) 10'; Barcos 56' (pen.); Barcos (red card) 63'; Riveros (yellow card) 65'; Bastos (yellow card) 81'; Ramiro (yellow card) 90+1'	Stadium: Pacaembu; Attendance: 29,353; Referee: Sandro Meira Ricci

18 October 29	Goiás	0 – 0	Grêmio	Goiânia
18:30 UTC-03:00	Amaral (yellow card) 26'; Felipe Macedo (yellow card) 53'; Pedro Henrique (yellow card) 72'	Report	Pará (yellow card) 25'	Stadium: Serra Dourada; Attendance: 3,044; Referee: Marielson Alves Silva

=== Copa do Brasil ===
==== Matches ====
===== Round of 16 =====
28 August 1st leg	Grêmio	0 – 2	Santos	Porto Alegre
20:00 UTC-03:00	Ramiro (yellow card) 41'; Pará (yellow card) 88'	Report	David Braz 38'; Robinho 45'; Edu Dracena (yellow card) 53'; Alison (yellow card) 59'; David Braz (yellow card) 82'	Stadium: Arena do Grêmio; Attendance: 30,294; Referee: Wilton Pereira Sampaio

Canceled 2nd leg	Santos	v	Grêmio	Santos
				Stadium: Vila Belmiro
Note: Three points were deducted from Grêmio by case of racism in the first leg against Santos. Thus, the second leg has not been played.

== Statistics ==
=== Appearances ===
No.	Pos	Nat	Player	Campeonato Brasileiro	Copa Libertadores	Copa do Brasil	Campeonato Gaúcho	Total
1	GK	(Brazil)	Marcelo Grohe	34	8	1	12	55
12	GK	(Brazil)	Leonardo	0	0	0	0	0
24	GK	(Brazil)	Tiago Machowski	3	0	0	1	4
40	GK	(Brazil)	Jakson Follmann	0	0	0	3	3
2	DF	(Brazil)	Pará	31 (1)	8	1	13	53 (1)
3	DF	(Brazil)	Pedro Geromel	23	2 (1)	0	3 (1)	28 (2)
4	DF	(Brazil)	Rhodolfo	24	6	1	12	43
5	DF	(Brazil)	Werley	11 (2)	8	1	9	29 (2)
10	DF	(Brazil)	Zé Roberto	23 (7)	5	1	7	36 (7)
15	DF	(Brazil)	Bressan	15 (2)	0 (1)	0	7	22 (3)
18	DF	(Argentina)	Matías Rodríguez	6 (2)	0	0 (1)	0	6 (3)
20	DF	(Brazil)	Saimon	4 (1)	0	0	1	5 (1)
21	DF	(Brazil)	Breno	8	0 (1)	0	6	14 (1)
–	DF	(Brazil)	Gabriel	0	0	0	0	0
6	MF	(Brazil)	Fellipe Bastos	20 (1)	0	0	0	20 (1)
8	MF	(Brazil)	Edinho	7 (3)	8	0	13	28 (3)
11	MF	(Argentina)	Alan Ruiz	12 (10)	1 (4)	0 (1)	5 (6)	18 (21)
16	MF	(Paraguay)	Cristian Riveros	15 (7)	8	0	10 (2)	33 (9)
17	MF	(Brazil)	Ramiro	31 (1)	7	1	13	52 (1)
19	MF	(Brazil)	Matheus Biteco	8 (9)	0	0 (1)	2	10 (10)
33	MF	(Brazil)	Walace	14 (4)	0	1	0	15 (4)
88	MF	(Brazil)	Giuliano	9 (8)	0	1	0	10 (8)
7	FW	(Brazil)	Dudu	32 (2)	5 (2)	1	7 (3)	45 (7)
9	FW	(Argentina)	Hernán Barcos	31	8	1	13	53
23	FW	(Brazil)	Everton	0 (7)	0	0	3 (4)	3 (11)
26	FW	(Brazil)	Luan	23 (4)	6 (1)	1	13 (1)	43 (6)
28	FW	(Brazil)	Lucas Coelho	6 (12)	0 (2)	0	1 (2)	7 (16)
77	FW	(Brazil)	Fernandinho	3 (10)	0	0	0	3 (10)
Players who currently do not integrate the First team squad
12	GK	(Brazil)	Gustavo Busatto	1	0	0	3	4
13	DF	(Brazil)	Moisés	1	0	0	2	3
18	DF	(Brazil)	Wendell	2	7	0	13	22
22	DF	(Brazil)	Guilherme Tinga	0	0	0	2 (1)	2 (1)
35	DF	(Brazil)	Rafael Thyere	0 (1)	0	0	3	3 (1)
36	DF	(Brazil)	Marquinhos Pedroso	1	0	0	0	1
–	DF	(Brazil)	Cleylton	0	0	0	2	2
–	DF	(Brazil)	Gabriel Spessatto	0	0	0	2	2
–	DF	(Brazil)	Matheus Barbosa	0	0	0	1 (1)	1 (1)
–	DF	(Argentina)	Robertino Canavesio	0	0	0	1	1
6	MF	(Brazil)	Léo Gago	0 (1)	1 (2)	0	3 (2)	4 (5)
14	MF	(Uruguay)	Maxi Rodríguez	0 (4)	0 (6)	0	6 (5)	6 (15)
14	MF	(Brazil)	Leandro Canhoto	0	0	0	1 (1)	1 (1)
25	MF	(Brazil)	Jean Deretti	0 (1)	0 (1)	0	0 (10)	0 (12)
27	MF	(Brazil)	Rodriguinho	8 (3)	0 (1)	0	0	8 (4)
29	MF	(Brazil)	Adriano	0	0	0	1 (2)	1 (2)
32	MF	(Brazil)	Guilherme Amorim	0	0	0	2 (1)	2 (1)
–	MF	(Brazil)	Moisés	0	0	0	3	3
–	MF	(Brazil)	Jeferson Negueba	0	0	0	2 (1)	2 (1)
–	MF	(Brazil)	Ângelo	0	0	0	0 (2)	0 (2)
–	MF	(Brazil)	Guilherme Biteco	0	0	0	0 (1)	0 (1)
–	MF	(Brazil)	Marco Antônio	0	0	0	0 (1)	0 (1)
–	MF	(Brazil)	Felipe Ferreira	0	0	0	0 (1)	0 (1)
25	FW	(Brazil)	Erik	1 (2)	0	0	0	1 (2)
27	FW	(Brazil)	Everaldo	0	0 (1)	0	5 (2)	5 (3)
29	FW	(Brazil)	Nicolas Careca	0 (1)	0	0	0	0 (1)
30	FW	(Brazil)	Kléber	0 (2)	0	0	3	3 (2)
34	FW	(Brazil)	Ronan	1 (1)	0	0	0	1 (1)
–	FW	(Brazil)	Yuri Mamute	0	0	0	2 (2)	2 (2)
–	FW	(Brazil)	Paulinho	0	0	0	0 (2)	0 (2)

As of 7 December 2014.
Source: Match reports in Competitions

=== Goalscorers ===
The list include all goals in competitive matches.

No.	Pos	Nat	Player	Campeonato Brasileiro	Copa Libertadores	Copa do Brasil	Campeonato Gaúcho	Total
1	FW	(Argentina)	Hernán Barcos	14	2	0	13	29
2	FW	(Brazil)	Luan	4	1	0	3	8
2	FW	(Brazil)	Dudu	3	2	0	3	8
4	MF	(Argentina)	Alan Ruiz	4	1	0	0	5
5	MF	(Brazil)	Ramiro	2	1	0	0	3
6	FW	(Brazil)	Lucas Coelho	2	0	0	0	2
6	MF	(Paraguay)	Cristian Riveros	1	1	0	0	2
6	FW	(Brazil)	Everton	0	0	0	2	2
12	MF	(Brazil)	Giuliano	1	0	0	0	1
12	DF	(Brazil)	Rhodolfo	0	1	0	0	1
12	DF	(Brazil)	Bressan	0	0	0	1	1
12	MF	(Brazil)	Edinho	0	0	0	1	1
12	DF	(Brazil)	Saimon	0	0	0	1	1
12	DF	(Brazil)	Werley	0	0	0	1	1
12	DF	(Brazil)	Zé Roberto	0	0	0	1	1
Players who do not integrate over the First team squad
6	MF	(Brazil)	Rodriguinho	2	0	0	0	2
6	MF	(Uruguay)	Maxi Rodríguez	1	0	0	1	2
6	MF	(Brazil)	Jean Deretti	0	0	0	2	2
12	FW	(Brazil)	Everaldo	0	0	0	1	1
12	MF	(Brazil)	Leandro Canhoto	0	0	0	1	1
12	FW	(Brazil)	Kléber	0	0	0	1	1
12	DF	(Brazil)	Wendell	0	0	0	1	1
12	FW	(Brazil)	Yuri Mamute	0	0	0	1	1
Own goals				1	0	0	1	2
Total				35	9	0	35	79

As of 7 December 2014.
Source: Match reports in Competitions

=== Clean sheets ===
Ran	Pos	Nat	Player	Campeonato Brasileiro	Copa Libertadores	Copa do Brasil	Campeonato Gaúcho	Total
1	GK	(Brazil)	Marcelo Grohe	19	6	0	5	30
2	GK	(Brazil)	Tiago Machowski	2	0	0	1	3
Total				21	6	0	6	33

As of 7 December 2014.
Source: Match reports in Competitions

=== Overview ===
Games played	66 (19 Campeonato Gaúcho, 8 Copa Libertadores, 38 Campeonato Brasileiro, 1 Copa do Brasil)
Games won	32 (10 Campeonato Gaúcho, 5 Copa Libertadores, 17 Campeonato Brasileiro)
Games drawn	17 (5 Campeonato Gaúcho, 2 Copa Libertadores, 10 Campeonato Brasileiro)
Games lost	17 (4 Campeonato Gaúcho, 1 Copa Libertadores, 11 Campeonato Brasileiro, 1 Copa do Brasil)
Goals scored	80
Goals conceded	46
Goal difference	+34
Clean sheets	33
Best result	4–0 (H) v Aimoré - Campeonato Gaúcho - 26 January
Worst result	1–4 (A) v Internacional - Campeonato Gaúcho 13 April
Top scorer	Barcos (29)

Updated to match played 7 December 2014.
Source: Competitions

== Awards ==
=== Player ===
No.	Pos	Nat	Player	Award	Month
9	FW	(Argentina)	Hernán Barcos	Campeonato Gaúcho Best Goalscorer	April
26	FW	(Brazil)	Luan	Campeonato Gaúcho Best Newcomer	April
4	DF	(Brazil)	Rhodolfo	Campeonato Gaúcho XI	April
18	DF	(Brazil)	Wendell	Campeonato Gaúcho XI	April
26	FW	(Brazil)	Luan	Campeonato Gaúcho XI	April
9	FW	(Argentina)	Hernán Barcos	Campeonato Brasileiro Best Goalscorer	December
1	GK	(Brazil)	Marcelo Grohe	Campeonato Brasileiro XI	December
10	DF	(Brazil)	Zé Roberto	Campeonato Brasileiro XI	December

Last updated: 7 December 2014.
