= List of Brazilian football transfers 2017 =

This is the 2017 transfer window for Brazilian football season 2017. Additionally, players without a club may join at any time, clubs may sign players on loan at any time, and clubs may sign a goalkeeper on an emergency loan if they have no registered goalkeeper available.

== Transfers ==
All Players without a flag are Brazilian.

| Date | Name | Moving from | Moving to | Fee | Source |
|---|---|---|---|---|---|
| 1 January 2017 | (Qatar) Emerson | (Rio de Janeiro (state)) Flamengo | Free Agent | End of contract | |
| 1 January 2017 | Alan Patrick | (Rio de Janeiro (state)) Flamengo | (Ukraine) Shakhtar Donetsk | Loan return | |
| 1 January 2017 | Chiquinho | (Rio de Janeiro (state)) Flamengo | Free Agent | End of contract | |
| 1 January 2017 | Fernandinho | (Rio de Janeiro (state)) Flamengo | (Rio Grande do Sul) Grêmio | Loan return | |
| 6 January 2017 | (Turkey) Colin Kazim-Richards | (Paraná (state)) Coritiba | (São Paulo (state)) Corinthians | Undisclosed | |
| 11 January 2017 | (Argentina) Lucas Mugni | (Rio de Janeiro (state)) Flamengo | Free Agent | Released | |
| 13 January 2017 | Gabriel | (São Paulo (state)) Monte Azul | (São Paulo (state)) Corinthians | Undisclosed | |
| 14 January 2017 | Luidy | (Alagoas) CRB | (São Paulo (state)) Corinthians | Undisclosed | |
| 14 January 2017 | Fellipe Bastos | (United Arab Emirates) Al Ain | (São Paulo (state)) Corinthians | Free | |
| 27 January 2017 | (Colombia) Orlando Berrío | (Colombia) Atlético Nacional | (Rio de Janeiro (state)) Flamengo | US$3,5m / €3,3m | |
| 6 February 2017 | Renê | (Pernambuco) Sport | (Rio de Janeiro (state)) Flamengo | US$1,1m / €1,0m | |
| 5 June 2017 | Everton Ribeiro | (United Arab Emirates) Al-Ahli | (Rio de Janeiro (state)) Flamengo | US$6,7m / €6,0m | |
| 11 June 2017 | Rhodolfo | (Turkey) Beşiktaş | (Rio de Janeiro (state)) Flamengo | US$1,2m / €1,1m | |
