= Xuxa (disambiguation) =

Xuxa is a Brazilian singer, actress, and television show hostess.

Xuxa may also refer to:

== Arts, entertainment and media ==
- Xuxa (album), a 1993 album by Xuxa
- Xuxa (American TV program), a children's show
- Xuxa: The Mega-Marketing of Gender, Race, and Modernity, a 1993 book by Amelia Simpson

== People ==
- Xuxa (footballer) (Cássio Luís Rissardo, born 1981), Brazilian footballer
- Fernando Scherer (born 1974), nicknamed Xuxa, Brazilian Olympic swimmer
- Gustavo Xuxa (born 1993), Brazilian footballer

== See also ==
- Susan (given name)
