= Saimon Tormen =

Brazilian footballer

Saimon
Personal information
- Full name: Saimon Pains Tormen
- Date of birth: 3 March 1991 (age 35)
- Place of birth: Erechim, Brazil
- Height: 1.83 m (6 ft 0 in)
- Position: Centre-back

Team information
- Current team: Botafogo-PB
- Number: 4

Youth career
- 2007–2009: Grêmio

Senior career*
Years	Team	Apps	(Gls)
2009–2014	Grêmio	53	(1)
2015	Vitória	2	(0)
2015	Figueirense	10	(0)
2016	Mogi Mirim	9	(0)
2017	Passo Fundo	4	(0)
2018	Ypiranga-RS	6	(0)
2019	São Caetano	5	(0)
2019–2020	Ypiranga	20	(1)
2020–2021	Vila Nova	23	(2)
2021–2022	Londrina	44	(0)
2023–2024	CRB	54	(2)
2025–2026	Ponte Preta	24	(0)
2026–	Botafogo-PB	10	(1)

International career
2011	Brazil U20	4	(0)
- * Club domestic league appearances and goals as of 8 November 2026

Saimon Pains Tormen (born 3 March 1991), or simply Saimon, is a Brazilian professional footballer who plays as a centre-back for Botafogo-PB.

== Career ==
On 5 February 2009, Saimon debuted for Grêmio in a 3-1 away loss against Veranópolis, at Campeonato Gaúcho.

== Career statistics ==
As of 30 September 2014.

Club	Season	League			National Cup		Continental		Other		Total	
Club	Season	Division	Apps	Goals	Apps	Goals	Apps	Goals	Apps	Goals	Apps	Goals
Grêmio	2009	Série A	1	0	0	0	0	0	4	0	5	0
Grêmio	2010	Série A	2	0	1	0	0	0	0	0	3	0
Grêmio	2011	Série A	21	0	0	0	0	0	2	0	23	0
Grêmio	2012	Série A	3	0	1	0	0	0	4	0	8	0
Grêmio	2013	Série A	9	0	0	0	3	0	1	0	13	0
Grêmio	2014	Série A	5	0	0	0	0	0	1	1	6	1
Grêmio	Total		41	0	2	0	3	0	12	1	58	1
Vitória	2015	Série B	0	0	0	0	0	0	0	0	0	0
Vitória	Total		0	0	0	0	0	0	0	0	0	0
Career total			41	0	2	0	3	0	12	1	58	1

== Honours ==
=== Club ===
Grêmio

- Campeonato Brasileiro Sub-20: 2009
- Campeonato Gaúcho: 2010

=== International ===
Brazil U20

- South American Youth Championship: 2011
