= Edinho (footballer, born 1983) =

Brazilian footballer

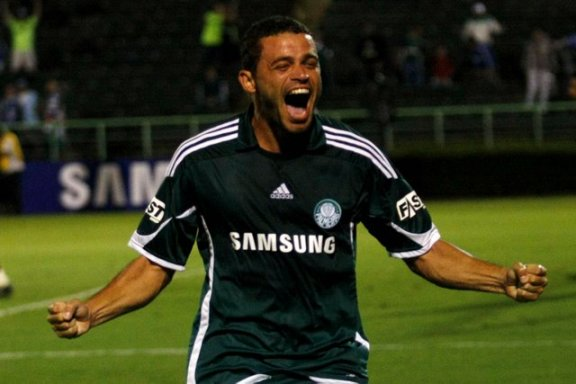

Personal information
- Full name: Edimo Ferreira Campos
- Date of birth: 15 January 1983 (age 43)
- Place of birth: Niterói, Brazil
- Height: 1.83 m (6 ft 0 in)
- Position: Defensive midfielder

Youth career
- 1999–2000: Barreira-RJ

Senior career*
Years	Team	Apps	(Gls)
2001–2002	Barreira-RJ	0	(0)
2003–2008	Internacional	172	(1)
2009	Lecce	31	(0)
2010	Palmeiras	30	(1)
2011–2013	Fluminense	100	(1)
2014–2016	Grêmio	31	(0)
2016–2017	Coritiba	28	(0)
2018	CSA	13	(1)
2018	Ceará	19	(0)
2019	Vila Nova	14	(0)
- * Club domestic league appearances and goals as of 20:45, 29 January 2020 (UTC)

Edimo Ferreira Campos (born 15 January 1983), commonly known as Edinho, is a Brazilian former professional footballer who played as a defensive midfielder.

== Career ==
In January 2010, Palmeiras confirmed that the club signed another reinforcement for the team. This season, the club signed the defensive midfielder for 4 years, until December 2013.

In January 2011, Fluminense sign the player for peticion by, Muricy Ramalho, coach of the Fluminense.

On 19 December 2013, with the end of his contract with Fluminense, transferred to the Grêmio for the 2014 season.

On the June 6, 2016, it was involved in a change for player Negueba, in the which Edinho will act for Coritiba.

== Career statistics ==
As of 2 April 2017

Club	Season	League			National Cup		Continental		Other		Total	
Club	Season	Division	Apps	Goals	Apps	Goals	Apps	Goals	Apps	Goals	Apps	Goals
Lecce	2008-09	Serie A	14	0	0	0	0	0	0	0	14	0
Lecce	2009-10	Serie B	17	0	2	0	0	0	0	0	19	0
Lecce	Total		31	0	2	0	0	0	0	0	33	0
Palmeiras	2010	Série A	30	1	8	1	7	0	14	0	59	2
Fluminense	2011	Série A	33	1	0	0	6	0	11	0	50	1
Fluminense	2012	Série A	33	0	0	0	8	0	11	0	52	0
Fluminense	2013	Série A	34	0	2	0	10	0	14	0	60	0
Fluminense	Total		100	1	2	0	24	0	36	0	162	1
Grêmio	2014	Série A	10	0	0	0	8	0	13	1	31	1
Grêmio	2015	Série A	19	0	5	0	0	0	0	0	24	0
Grêmio	2016	Série A	2	0	0	0	5	0	13	1	20	1
Grêmio	Total		31	0	5	0	13	0	26	2	75	2
Coritiba	2016	Série A	20	0	0	0	2	0	0	0	22	0
Coritiba	2017	Série A	0	0	1	0	0	0	8	0	9	0
Coritiba	Total		20	0	1	0	2	0	8	0	31	0
Career total			212	2	18	1	46	0	84	2	360	5

== Honours ==
=== Club ===
Internacional

- Campeonato Gaúcho: 2003, 2004, 2005, 2008
- Copa Libertadores: 2006
- FIFA Club World Cup: 2006
- Recopa Sudamericana: 2007
- Copa Sudamericana: 2008

Fluminense

- Campeonato Carioca: 2012
- Campeonato Brasileiro Série A: 2012

Coritiba

- Campeonato Paranaense: 2017
