= Breno Lorran =

Brazilian footballer (born 1995)

Personal information
- Full name: Breno Lorran da Silva Talvares
- Date of birth: 6 March 1995 (age 31)
- Place of birth: Teodoro Sampaio, Brazil
- Height: 1.74 m (5 ft 9 in)
- Position: Left back

Team information
- Current team: Linense
- Number: 6

Youth career
- 2010–2013: Red Bull Brasil
- 2013: Grêmio

Senior career*
| Years | Team | Apps | (Gls) |
| 2014–2017 | Grêmio | 15 | (0) |
| 2014–2016 | →Vitória Guimarães (loan) | 8 | (0) |
| 2017 | → São Bernardo (loan) | 7 | (0) |
| 2017 | Brasil de Pelotas | 23 | (0) |
| 2018–2019 | Goiás | 6 | (0) |
| 2019 | → Figueirense (loan) | 4 | (0) |
| 2019–2020 | Londrina | 12 | (0) |
| 2020 | Nea Salamina | 32 | (1) |
| 2021 | Náutico | 9 | (0) |
| 2022 | Aparecidense | 8 | (0) |
| 2023 | Marília | 10 | (0) |
| 2024– | Linense | 5 | (0) |
- * Club domestic league appearances and goals as of 19:57, 2 February 2022 (UTC)

Breno Lorran da Silva Talvares (born 6 March 1995), or simply Breno Lorran, is a Brazilian professional footballer who plays as a left back for Linense.

== Career statistics ==
As of 27 December 2014.

| Club | Season | League | | | National Cup | | Continental | | Other | | Total | |
| Club | Season | Division | Apps | Goals | Apps | Goals | Apps | Goals | Apps | Goals | Apps | Goals |
|---|---|---|---|---|---|---|---|---|---|---|---|---|
| Grêmio | 2014 | Série A | 8 | 0 | 0 | 0 | 1 | 0 | 6 | 0 | 15 | 0 |
| Grêmio | Total | | 8 | 0 | 0 | 0 | 1 | 0 | 6 | 0 | 15 | 0 |
| Career total | | | 8 | 0 | 0 | 0 | 1 | 0 | 6 | 0 | 15 | 0 |
