= Lucas Coelho =

Brazilian footballer

Personal information
- Full name: Lucas Heinzen Coelho
- Date of birth: 20 July 1994 (age 32)
- Place of birth: Lages, Brazil
- Height: 1.86 m (6 ft 1 in)
- Position: Forward

Team information
- Current team: Londrina

Youth career
- 2008–2013: Grêmio

Senior career*
Years	Team	Apps	(Gls)
2013–2017	Grêmio	39	(4)
2015	→ Goiás (loan)	16	(0)
2016	→ Avaí (loan)	20	(5)
2017	→ ABC (loan)	16	(2)
2018	Criciúma	16	(2)
2019	Cruzeiro-RS	4	(4)
2020	Cianorte	5	(0)
2020	Hercílio Luz	7	(2)
2021	Cascavel CR	3	(1)
2021–2022	Boa Esporte	12	(6)
2022	Uberlândia	11	(1)
2022–2023	Cascavel	25	(8)
2023–	Londrina	8	(0)
- * Club domestic league appearances and goals as of 6 September 2023

Lucas Heinzen Coelho (born 20 July 1994) is a Brazilian professional footballer who plays as a forward for Londrina.

== Career statistics ==
As of 21 January 2017

Appearances and goals by club, season and competition
Club	Season	League			National cup		Continental		Other		Total	
Club	Season	Division	Apps	Goals	Apps	Goals	Apps	Goals	Apps	Goals	Apps	Goals
Grêmio	2013	Série A	6	0	2	0	0	0	4	2	12	2
Grêmio	2014	Série A	18	2	0	0	2	0	3	0	23	2
Grêmio	2015	Série A	0	0	0	0	0	0	4	0	4	0
Grêmio	Total		24	2	2	0	2	0	11	2	39	4
Goiás (loan)	2015	Série A	9	0	0	0	0	0	3	0	12	0
Avaí (loan)	2016	Série B	20	5	0	0	0	0	0	0	20	5
Career total		53	7	2	0	2	0	14	2	71	9	
