= Gabriel Biteco =

Brazilian footballer

Personal information
- Full name: Gabriel Bitencourt da Silva
- Date of birth: 22 May 1999 (age 27)
- Place of birth: Porto Alegre, Brazil
- Height: 1.75 m (5 ft 9 in)
- Position: Right back

Team information
- Current team: Bagé

Youth career
- 2012–2019: Grêmio

Senior career*
Years	Team	Apps	(Gls)
2019–2020	Grêmio	19	(1)
2020	→ Esportivo (loan)	0	(0)
2021	Mogi Mirim	7	(0)
2022	Rio Branco-PR	8	(1)
2022	América-TO	10	(0)
2023	União Frederiquense	20	(1)
2024	Brasil de Pelotas	11	(0)
2024–	Bagé	24	(1)
2025	→ Concórdia (loan)	13	(1)
- * Club domestic league appearances and goals as of 28 October 2025

Gabriel Bitencourt da Silva (born 22 May 1999), better known as Gabriel Biteco, is a Brazilian professional footballer who plays as a right winger for Bagé.

== Career ==
Formed in Grêmio's youth categories since 2012, Biteco played for the club on a few occasions, especially for the under-23 team. He also had a spell without playing for Esportivo and in 2021 defended Mogi Mirim in the Campeonato Paulista Segunda Divisão. In 2022, Gabriel played alongside his brother Guilherme at Rio Branco de Paranaguá during the Campeonato Paranaense. In the second half of the year, Biteco defended América de Teófilo Otoni, and in 2023, he returned to Rio Grande do Sul to play for União Frederiquense.

On 26 December 2023, he was announced as a reinforcement by Brasil de Pelotas. Biteco was later acquired by GE Bagé, and in 2025, loaned to Concórdia to compete in the state championship.

== Personal life ==
Gabriel Biteco is brother of the also footballers Guilherme Biteco and Matheus Biteco, who died at the LaMia Flight 2933.
