= Matheus Biteco =

Brazilian footballer (1995–2016)

Personal information
- Full name: Matheus Bitencourt da Silva
- Date of birth: 28 June 1995
- Place of birth: Porto Alegre, Brazil
- Date of death: 28 November 2016 (aged 21)
- Place of death: La Unión, Colombia
- Height: 1.72 m (5 ft 8 in)
- Position: Defensive midfielder

Youth career
- 2001–2012: Grêmio

Senior career*
Years	Team	Apps	(Gls)
2013–2015	Grêmio	37	(0)
2015–2016	Barra-SC	0	(0)
2015	→ Grêmio (loan)	0	(0)
2016	→ 1899 Hoffenheim (loan)	0	(0)
2016	→ Chapecoense (loan)	16	(0)
Total		53	(0)

International career
2013–2014	Brazil U20	10	(1)
2014	Brazil U21	4	(0)
- * Club domestic league appearances and goals

Matheus Bitencourt da Silva (28 June 1995 – 28 November 2016), known as Matheus Biteco, was a Brazilian professional footballer who played as a defensive midfielder for Chapecoense.

Matheus Biteco was one of the victims when LaMia Airlines Flight 2933 crashed on 28 November 2016.

== Club career ==
Matheus Biteco was born in Porto Alegre, Rio Grande do Sul, and joined Grêmio's youth setup in 2001 at the age of five. He made his senior debut on 1 February 2013, coming on as a second half substitute in a 0–4 Campeonato Gaúcho away loss against São Luiz. He was handed his first start 13 days later, in a 5–0 Campeonato Gaúcho home routing of Santa Cruz; his older brother Guilherme also started the match.

Matheus Biteco made his Série A debut on 14 July 2013, replacing Souza in a 2–1 home win against Botafogo. Definitely promoted to the main squad ahead of the 2014 season, he started to feature more regularly, contributing with 18 league matches.

In December 2014, Matheus Biteco's federative rights were sold to a group of businessmen, being assigned to Santa Catarina-based club Barra and being loaned back to Grêmio for the season. He would spend the vast majority of the year nursing a pubalgia in Switzerland, however.

In February 2016 Matheus Biteco joined TSG 1899 Hoffenheim, but failed to appear in any matches for the club. On 5 July, he was announced at Chapecoense.

At Chape Matheus Biteco became a regular starter, also helping the side to reach the 2016 Copa Sudamericana Finals for the first time in their history.

== Death ==
On 28 November 2016, whilst travelling with Chapecoense to the aforementioned finals, Matheus Biteco was among the fatalities of the LaMia Flight 2933 accident in the Colombian village of Cerro Gordo, La Unión, Antioquia.

== Personal life ==
Matheus Biteco's brothers Guilherme and Gabriel, are also footballers; all of whom came through the Grêmio academy and made appearances for the senior squad. The former is an attacking midfielder, while the latter is a forward.

== Career statistics ==
As of 27 November 2016

Club	Season	League			State League		Cup		Continental		Other		Total	
Club	Season	Division	Apps	Goals	Apps	Goals	Apps	Goals	Apps	Goals	Apps	Goals	Apps	Goals
Grêmio	2013	Série A	11	0	6	0	1	0	—		—		18	0
Grêmio	2014	Série A	18	0	2	0	1	0	0	0	—		21	0
Grêmio	2015	Série A	0	0	0	0	0	0	—		—		0	0
Grêmio	Total		29	0	8	0	2	0	0	0	—		39	0
1899 Hoffenheim	2015–16	Bundesliga	0	0	—		0	0	—		—		0	0
Chapecoense	2016	Série A	16	0	—		2	0	6 (Note: Appearance(s) in Copa Sudamericana)	0	—		24	0
Career total			45	0	8	0	4	0	6	0	0	0	63	0

== Honours ==
=== Club ===
Chapecoense

- Copa Sudamericana: 2016 (posthumously)

=== International ===
Brazil U20

- Toulon Tournament: 2013
