= Robertino Canavesio =

Argentine professional footballer

Personal information
- Full name: Robertino Canavesio
- Date of birth: 2 April 1993 (age 33)
- Place of birth: Pergamino, Argentina
- Height: 1.90 m (6 ft 3 in)
- Position: Centre-back

Team information
- Current team: San Telmo

Youth career
- –2010: Douglas Haig
- 2010–2011: Sarmiento
- 2012: All Boys
- 2013: Parma
- 2013: Grêmio

Senior career*
Years	Team	Apps	(Gls)
2011–2012	Sarmiento	2	(2)
2014–2016	Grêmio	0	(0)
2014	→ Sarmiento (loan)	1	(0)
2016–2017	Rivadavia Lincoln	11	(0)
2017–2019	Tubarão	21	(0)
2020	Concórdia		
2020–2021	Douglas Haig	14	(0)
2022–	San Telmo	6	(0)
- * Club domestic league appearances and goals as of 19:37, 31 July 2022 (UTC)

Robertino Canavesio (born 2 April 1993) is an Argentine professional footballer who plays as a centre-back for San Telmo.

== Career ==
Born in Pergamino, Canavesio began playing football in local club Douglas Haig's youth system. He joined Sarmiento in 2011, and soon was selected to play for the senior team in the Primera B Metropolitana. On 5 November 2011 he made his professional debut playing 90 minutes in a 2–0 home won against Acassuso for the Primera B Metropolitana.

After a spell abroad with Parma, Canavesio signed with Grêmio, and played once in Campeonato Gaúcho, a 1–0 away loss to São José-RS. In June 2014, Canavesio returned to Sarmiento to play in the Primera B Nacional by loan until April 2015.

== Career statistics ==
As of 30 September 2014.

Club	Season	League			National Cup		Continental		Other		Total	
Club	Season	Division	Apps	Goals	Apps	Goals	Apps	Goals	Apps	Goals	Apps	Goals
Sarmiento	2011-12	Primera B Metropolitana	2	2	2	0	0	0	0	0	4	2
Sarmiento	Total		2	2	2	0	0	0	0	0	4	2
Grêmio	2014	Série A	0	0	0	0	0	0	1	0	1	0
Grêmio	Total		0	0	0	0	0	0	1	0	1	0
Sarmiento (loan)	2014-15	Primera B Nacional	1	0	0	0	0	0	0	0	1	0
Sarmiento (loan)	Total		1	0	0	0	0	0	0	0	1	0
Career total			3	2	2	0	0	0	1	0	6	2

== Honours ==
=== Club ===
Sarmiento

- Primera B Metropolitana: 2011-12
