= Jean Deretti =

Brazilian footballer

Personal information
- Full name: Jean Alexandre Deretti
- Date of birth: 1 May 1993 (age 33)
- Place of birth: Jaraguá do Sul, Brazil
- Height: 1.74 m (5 ft 9 in)
- Position: Attacking midfielder

Youth career
- 2007–2011: Figueirense

Senior career*
Years	Team	Apps	(Gls)
2011–2016	Figueirense	19	(2)
2013–2014	→ Grêmio Porto Alegre (loan)	19	(2)
2014	→ Joinville (loan)	3	(0)
2014	→ Mogi Mirim (loan)	7	(0)
2017	Dila Gori	17	(4)
2018	Ypiranga	10	(1)
2018–2019	Senica	24	(4)
2019	Academica Clinceni	10	(1)
2019-2021	Resende	5	(1)
2021	Politehnica Iași	8	(1)

International career
2012–2014	Brazil U20		
Medal record
31 May 2019
- * Club domestic league appearances and goals as of 13:11, 26 January 2022 (UTC)

Jean Alexandre Deretti (born 1 May 1993), known as Jean Deretti, is a Brazilian professional footballer who plays as an attacking midfielder.

== Career ==
In January 2017, Deretti signed for Dila Gori.

== Career statistics ==
As of 3 September 2014.

Club	Season	League			National Cup		Continental		Other		Total	
Club	Season	Division	Apps	Goals	Apps	Goals	Apps	Goals	Apps	Goals	Apps	Goals
Figueirense	2011	Série A	2	0	0	0	0	0	0	0	2	0
Figueirense	2012	Série A	7	0	0	0	1	0	5	1	13	1
Figueirense	Total		9	0	0	0	1	0	5	1	15	1
Grêmio (loan)	2013	Série A	3	0	0	0	1	0	5	0	9	0
Grêmio (loan)	2014	Série A	1	0	0	0	1	0	10	2	11	2
Grêmio (loan)	Total		4	0	0	0	2	0	15	2	21	2
Joinville (loan)	2014	Série B	0	0	0	0	0	0	0	0	0	0
Joinville (loan)	Total		0	0	0	0	0	0	0	0	0	0
Career total			13	0	0	0	3	0	20	3	36	3

== Honours ==
Joinville

- Brazilian Série B: 2014
