= Yuri Mamute =

Brazilian footballer

Personal information
- Full name: Yuri Souza Almeida
- Date of birth: 7 May 1995 (age 31)
- Place of birth: Porto Alegre, Brazil
- Height: 1.80 m (5 ft 11 in)
- Position: Forward

Team information
- Current team: Joinville Esporte Clube
- Number: 9

Youth career
- 2007–2012: Grêmio

Senior career*
Years	Team	Apps	(Gls)
2013–2019	Grêmio	26	(3)
2014	→ Botafogo (loan)	17	(0)
2016	→ Panathinaikos (loan)	7	(0)
2016	→ Náutico (loan)	11	(0)
2017	→ Aktobe (loan)	15	(3)
2017–2018	→ Juventude (loan)	13	(1)
2019	Água Santa	2	(0)
2019	Figueirense	12	(0)
2020–2021	Sagamihara	54	(9)
2022	Azuriz	9	(2)
2023	Brasiliense	14	(8)
2023	Haiphong	6	(2)
2024	Joinville Esporte Clube	12	(5)
2024	CRAC	5	(0)
2024	SHB Da Nang	8	(0)
2025-	Joinville Esporte Clube	0	(0)

International career
2013–2015	Brazil U20	12	(3)
- * Club domestic league appearances and goals as of 19 January 2025

Yuri Souza Almeida (born 7 May 1995), commonly known as Yuri Mamute, is a Brazilian professional footballer who plays as a forward Central Esporte Clube.

== Club career ==
Yuri made his professional debut at Grêmio in 2011. In 2014, he was loaned to Botafogo. He returned to the "Tricolor Gaúcho" in early 2015 and became a starter in the team under Luiz Felipe Scolari, going on to play a bigger role in the tactics of the squad during Roger Machado's tenure. However, an injury to his ankle ligaments in July 2015 was a key factor keeping him out of action for about a month. Following his return from injury, he struggled to regain a starting position in the squad.

In January 2016, Panathinaikos and Grêmio confirmed a loan agreement was in place for Yuri who signed a half-year loan contract with the Greek club. The agreement included a fee of €100,000 for the first half season, rising to €200,000 if he were to play in the 2016–17 season. Panathinaikos secured the option to sign Yuri permanently either in the summer of 2016 for €4 million or at the end of the 18-month loan for €7 million. After three months with the club, Yuri was reportedly not deemed to be a suitable replacement for previous striker Nikolaos Karelis and rumoured to return to Grêmio at the end of the season.

In February 2017, Yuri went on trial with Kazakhstan Premier League side FC Aktobe, signing for the club on loan, on 18 February 2017.

In May 2023, Yuri moved to Vietnam, signing for V.League 1 club Haiphong.

In June 2024, Yuri signed for SHB Da Nang, also playing in the V.League 1.

== Career statistics ==
As of match played 28 June 2017

Club	Season	League			National Cup		Continental		Other		Total	
Club	Season	Division	Apps	Goals	Apps	Goals	Apps	Goals	Apps	Goals	Apps	Goals
Grêmio	2011	Série A	1	0	0	0	0	0	0	0	1	0
Grêmio	2012	Série A	0	0	0	0	0	0	2	0	2	0
Grêmio	2013	Série A	8	0	3	0	0	0	6	2	17	2
Grêmio	2014	Série A	0	0	0	0	0	0	4	1	4	1
Grêmio	2015	Série A	15	3	4	0	0	0	11	1	30	4
Grêmio	Total		24	3	7	0	0	0	23	4	54	7
Botafogo (loan)	2014	Série A	17	0	2	1	0	0	0	0	19	1
Botafogo (loan)	Total		17	0	2	1	0	0	0	0	19	1
Panathinaikos (loan)	2015–16	Super League Greece	8	0	0	0	0	0	0	0	8	0
Panathinaikos (loan)	Total		8	0	0	0	0	0	0	0	8	0
Náutico (loan)	2016	Série B	11	0	0	0	0	0	0	0	11	0
Náutico (loan)	Total		11	0	0	0	0	0	0	0	11	0
Aktobe (loan)	2017	Kazakhstan Premier League	15	3	1	0	0	0	0	0	16	3
Aktobe (loan)	Total		15	3	1	0	0	0	0	0	16	3
Career total			75	5	10	1	0	0	23	4	108	11

== Honours ==
=== National ===
Brazil U20

- Toulon Tournament: 2013

=== Individual ===
- Toulon Tournament Golden Ball: 2013
