= Moisés (footballer, born 1990) =

Brazilian footballer

Personal information
- Full name: Moisés Francisco Dallazen
- Date of birth: 9 August 1990 (age 36)
- Place of birth: Aratiba, Brazil
- Height: 1.81 m (5 ft 11 in)
- Positions: Right back; defensive midfielder

Team information
- Current team: Pelotas

Youth career
- –2011: Juventude

Senior career*
Years	Team	Apps	(Gls)
2011–2013	Juventude	9	(0)
2012	→ Canoas (loan)	2	(1)
2012	→ Brasil de Pelotas (loan)	1	(0)
2013–2016	Grêmio	7	(0)
2014	→ Goiás (loan)	13	(0)
2015	→ Santa Cruz (loan)	6	(0)
2016	→ Brasil de Pelotas (loan)	6	(0)
2017	Democrata GV	6	(0)
2017–2019	Luverdense	36	(1)
2019–2020	Cuiabá	11	(2)
2020–	Pelotas	0	(0)
- * Club domestic league appearances and goals as of 22:40, 4 February 2020 (UTC)

Moisés Francisco Dallazen (born 9 August 1990), or simply Moisés, is a Brazilian professional footballer who plays as a right back, but also occasionally as a defensive midfielder, for Pelotas.

== Career ==
=== Juventude ===
Moisés began his career in the academy of Juventude. In 2011, he received his first chance in the first team squad of the club, having been part of the group that won the Copa FGF that year. In January 2012, he was loaned for Canoas to gain experience, where he remained until the end of the Campeonato Gaúcho. In the second half of that year, he was loaned again, this time to Brasil (PE). However, he played only one match and returned to Juventude. In 2013, he excelled in the dispute of Campeonato Gaúcho, which eventually attracting the attention of the Grêmio, who months before had already signed with other players of the Juventude. Thus, signed with the club from Porto Alegre in May that year.

=== Grêmio ===
Moisés arrived at the Grêmio as a promise to the right back, having made his debut on 6 July, a 1–1 away draw against Atlético-PR at Campeonato Brasileiro Série A. However, received few opportunities in 2013 and early 2014, having played only seven matches in all competitions. In July 2014, he was loaned to Goiás until the end of the year. He made his debut for Goiás on 27 July, in 2–1 home won against São Paulo, also at Campeonato Brasileiro Série A.

== Career statistics ==
As of 30 September 2014.

Club	Season	League			National Cup		Continental		Other		Total	
Club	Season	Division	Apps	Goals	Apps	Goals	Apps	Goals	Apps	Goals	Apps	Goals
Juventude	2011	Série D	3	0	0	0	0	0	6	0	9	0
Juventude	2012	Série D	0	0	0	0	0	0	0	0	0	0
Juventude	2013	Série D	0	0	0	0	0	0	12	0	12	0
Juventude	Total		3	0	0	0	0	0	18	0	21	0
Canoas (loan)	2012	State	0	0	0	0	0	0	8	1	8	1
Canoas (loan)	Total		0	0	0	0	0	0	8	1	8	1
Brasil (PE) (loan)	2012	Série D	1	0	0	0	0	0	0	0	1	0
Brasil (PE) (loan)	Total		1	0	0	0	0	0	0	0	1	0
Grêmio	2013	Série A	4	0	0	0	0	0	0	0	4	0
Grêmio	2014	Série A	1	0	0	0	0	0	2	0	3	0
Grêmio	Total		5	0	0	0	0	0	2	0	7	0
Goiás (loan)	2014	Série A	8	0	0	0	1	0	0	0	9	0
Goiás (loan)	Total		8	0	0	0	1	0	0	0	9	0
Career total			17	0	0	0	1	0	28	1	46	1

== Honours ==
=== Club ===
Juventude

- Copa FGF: 2011
