= Rodrigo Sabiá =

Brazilian footballer (born 1992)

Personal information
- Full name: Rodrigo Augusto Sabiá
- Date of birth: 3 September 1992 (age 34)
- Place of birth: Mogi Guaçu, Brazil
- Height: 1.90 m (6 ft 3 in)
- Position: Centre back

Team information
- Current team: Paulista (on loan from Grêmio)

Youth career
- –2010: Paulista
- 2011: → Grêmio (loan)

Senior career*
Years	Team	Apps	(Gls)
2010–2011	Paulista	0	(0)
2012–	Grêmio	0	(0)
2012	→ Atlético Sorocaba (loan)	0	(0)
2013	→ Paulista (loan)	0	(0)
2013	→ Mogi Mirim (loan)	2	(0)
2014	→ Grêmio Osasco Audax (loan)	0	(0)
2014	→ Guaratinguetá (loan)	2	(0)
2015–	→ Paulista (loan)	0	(0)
- * Club domestic league appearances and goals as of 24 December 2014

Rodrigo Augusto Sabiá (born 3 September 1992) is a Brazilian professional footballer who plays as a centre back for Paulista, on loan from Grêmio.

== Career statistics ==
As of 24 December 2014.

Club	Season	League			National Cup		Continental		Other		Total	
Club	Season	Division	Apps	Goals	Apps	Goals	Apps	Goals	Apps	Goals	Apps	Goals
Paulista	2010	State	0	0	0	0	0	0	0	0	0	0
Paulista	2011	State	0	0	0	0	0	0	14	0	14	0
Paulista	Total		0	0	0	0	0	0	14	0	14	0
Grêmio	2012	Série A	0	0	0	0	0	0	0	0	0	0
Grêmio	2013	Série A	0	0	0	0	0	0	1	0	1	0
Grêmio	2014	Série A	0	0	0	0	0	0	0	0	0	0
Grêmio	Total		0	0	0	0	0	0	1	0	1	0
Atlético Sorocaba (loan)	2012	State	0	0	0	0	0	0	7	1	7	1
Atlético Sorocaba (loan)	Total		0	0	0	0	0	0	7	1	7	1
Paulista (loan)	2013	State	0	0	0	0	0	0	4	0	4	0
Paulista (loan)	Total		0	0	0	0	0	0	4	0	4	0
Mogi Mirim (loan)	2013	Série C	2	0	0	0	0	0	0	0	2	0
Mogi Mirim (loan)	Total		2	0	0	0	0	0	0	0	2	0
Grêmio O. Audax (loan)	2014	State	0	0	0	0	0	0	0	0	0	0
Grêmio O. Audax (loan)	Total		0	0	0	0	0	0	0	0	0	0
Guaratinguetá (loan)	2014	Série C	2	0	0	0	0	0	0	0	2	0
Guaratinguetá (loan)	Total		2	0	0	0	0	0	0	0	2	0
Career total			4	0	0	0	0	0	26	1	30	1
