= Luis Felippe =

Brazilian footballer

Personal information
- Full name: Luis Felippe Martins Reis
- Date of birth: 18 September 1996 (age 30)
- Place of birth: Nova Friburgo, Brazil
- Height: 1.92 m (6 ft 3 1/2 in)
- Position: Forward

Youth career
- Friburguense
- 2014–2015: Grêmio

Senior career*
Years	Team	Apps	(Gls)
2014	Friburguense	0	(0)
2015–2017	Grêmio	0	(0)
2015	→ Mallorca B (loan)	0	(0)
- * Club domestic league appearances and goals as of 16 March 2017

Luis Felippe Martins Reis (born 18 September 1996), known as Luis Felippe, is a Brazilian footballer who plays as a forward.

== Club career ==
Born in Nova Friburgo, Rio de Janeiro, Luis Felippe graduated with Friburguense's youth setup. On 1 February 2014 he made his senior debut, coming on as a second-half substitute in a 1–1 away draw against Volta Redonda for the Campeonato Carioca championship.

Luis Felippe scored his first goal on 15 February, netting the last in a 3–0 home win against Audax. He finished the competition with four goals in eight matches, attracting interest from Série A clubs.

On 17 July 2014, after nearly joining Internacional, Luis Felippe signed a three-year contract with Grêmio for a R$400,000 fee, returning to youth football. In May of the following year, after having altercations with the latter's staff, he nearly ended his career but was subsequently promoted to the main squad late in the month.

On 9 July 2015, Luis Felippe was loaned to Spanish Segunda División side RCD Mallorca, in a season-long deal.
