= Xuxa: The Mega-Marketing of Gender, Race, and Modernity =

1993 book by Amelia Simpson

Xuxa: The Mega-Marketing of Gender, Race and Modernity
- Author: Amelia Simpson
- Language: English
- Genre: Non-fiction, Cultural Analysis
- Published: 1993
- Publisher: Temple University Press
- Publication place: United States of America

Xuxa: The Mega-Marketing of Gender, Race, and Modernity is a book by Amelia Simpson written in 1993. Xuxa, a woman whose career spanned many avenues, is an icon to many Brazilians due to her portrayal as the epitome of Brazilianness (brazilidade). Simpson's book discusses Xuxa's contributions to Brazilian culture through analyzing her fan letters, interviews, magazine spreads, and her children shows.

== Synopsis ==
Xuxa: The Mega-Marketing of Gender, Race, and Modernity discusses how Xuxa's rise to extreme popularity reflects the culture of Brazil. In a time nearing and after the military regime, the need for traditionalism was high. Xuxa, a model, singer, actress, and host of a children's television show catered to this need through her overly-sexualized femininity as well as her ability to work with children which still allowed her to be sexual. She also used the "Racial Democracy" of Brazil through dating Pelé and by including Afro-Brazilians in the backgrounds of her movies. Finally, her television show and its endless advertising works in the 'Brazilian Dream', much like the 'American Dream', making kids believe that if they buy another of Xuxa's products, they too can become like her.

Simpson does this by analyzing mostly primary source texts. She uses fan letters, interviews, magazine critiques, segments from her shows (although mostly from Xou da Xuxa), and photos from magazine spreads to analyze the message that Xuxa pushes out. Fan letters allow Simpson to show how devoted to Xuxa citizens of Brazil and the world are and how much her power extends. According to the novel, Xuxa received 10,000 letters a day. Interviews, magazine critiques, and photos from magazine spreads show that unlike Barbie or Madonna in the United States, Xuxa had relatively little challenging nationally. They also show Xuxa's eroticism that she displayed in her shoots and public outings. Finally, segments from the show demonstrate her maternity that is both pining and sexualized.

== Critical reception ==
Simpson's book was well-received by other academics in the Latin American field. Simpson's ability to work cross-theoretically using feminist, class, and race critiques gave a depth to Xuxa, keeping the analysis away from making Xuxa's reach in Brazil seem like a simple idea. However, critics acknowledge that, as thorough as Simpson's book is, it is missing key elements that would allow it to have a greater impact. In regards to Simpson's ability to tie into Brazil and have impact there, Lisa Petrov states: "she does too little to avoid being an outsider looking into Brazilian culture. There is no significant discussion of Brazilian analysis, opposition or criticism of Xuxa and her show, of the television industry and its power in Brazil, or of the growing mass-consumerism of Brazilian society". In addition to this, Naples and Starr, in their critique of the book, say, "missing from Simpson's analysis is an exploration of the wider historical, cultural, and economic processes that contributed to her production as a commodity". By not utilizing the grander historical and cultural movements in the world, critiques say, Simpson has an impact purely on Brazilian culture instead of a greater scale.
