= Matías Rodríguez (footballer, born 1986) =

Argentine footballer

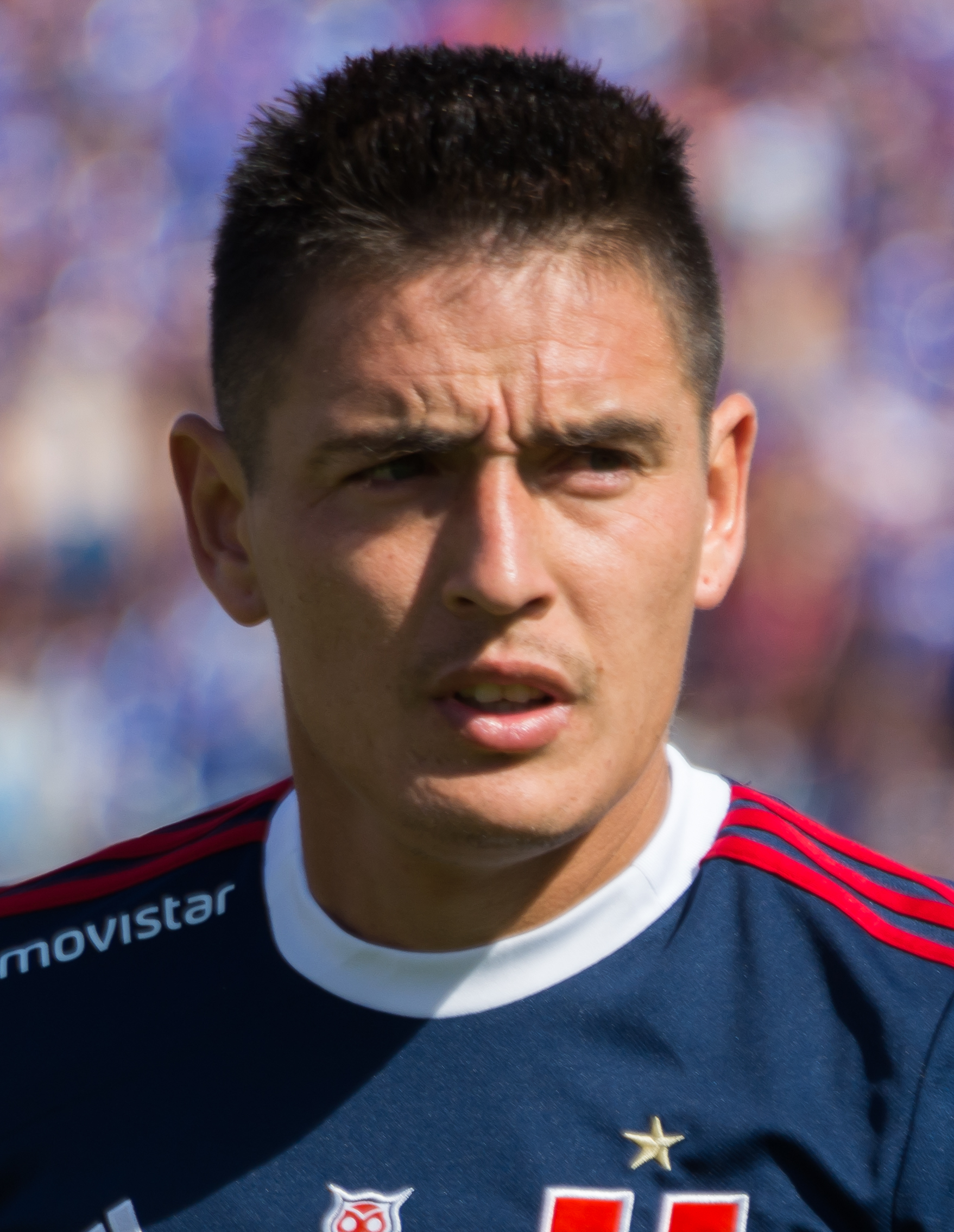
- Rodríguez with Universidad de Chile in 2019

Personal information
- Full name: Matías Nicolás Rodríguez
- Date of birth: 14 April 1986 (age 40)
- Place of birth: San Luis, Argentina
- Height: 1.78 m (5 ft 10 in)
- Positions: Right back; right midfielder

Youth career
- 1998–2006: Boca Juniors

Senior career*
Years	Team	Apps	(Gls)
2005–2008	Boca Juniors	0	(0)
2005–2006	→ Juventud Antoniana (loan)	–	(–)
2006	→ Aucas (loan)	11	(2)
2007	→ Barcelona SC (loan)	0	(0)
2008	→ LASK Linz (loan)	1	(0)
2008–2009	Nacional	42	(3)
2010–2013	Universidad de Chile	97	(22)
2013–2015	Sampdoria	3	(0)
2014–2015	→ Grêmio (loan)	10	(1)
2015–2021	Universidad de Chile	138	(19)
2021–2022	Defensa y Justicia	10	(0)
2024–2025	Deportes Melipilla	44	(11)
Total		356	(58)
- * Club domestic league appearances and goals

Matías Nicolás Rodríguez (Latin American Spanish: [maˈti.as nikoˈlas roˈðɾiɣes], born 14 April 1986) is an Argentine naturalized Chilean former professional footballer who played as a right-back or right midfielder.

== Club career ==
After years spending in Boca Juniors academy, he moved Ecuadorian Serie A club Aucas in mid-2006 (after fail joined on trial to Barcelona de Guayaquil), where scored three goals in 13 league matches, which his transfer fee was appraised in US$1 million, because their well performances. Following his success, he returned to Boca and had an horrible 2007, after have a seriously tibia and fibula injury. Finally, after one-and-half year without play, he joined Nacional Montevideo in June 2008.

In January 2010, following Gerardo Pelusso's departure (coach of Rodríguez at Nacional) to Universidad de Chile, he also joined Chilean club, where he won three league titles and the 2011 Copa Sudamericana title with Santiago-based club. However, all of these title was under manager Jorge Sampaoli, who replaced former coach Pelusso after bad results in 2010. Their most important goals with The Blues were in two derbies against Colo-Colo and in a 2010 Copa Libertadores game too with Flamengo, where he scored a last-minute equalizer goal that sealed a 2–2 away draw at Maracanã.

He also had serious possibilities of a move to Europe because his performances, being heavily linked with Portugal's Benfica in January 2012 after reach Copa Sudamericana title. However, on 29 January 2013, Rodríguez joined Italian Serie A club Sampdoria in a transfer fee a US$4.2 million (€3.28 million). He signed a 4 1/2-year contract. (in Italian)

On 30 May 2014, Rodríguez was loaned from Serie A side Sampdoria to Grêmio until June 2015.

On 19 July 2015 Rodríguez was re-signed by Universidad de Chile.

On March 8, 2021, it was made official Rodríguez joined Argentine club Defensa y Justicia, arriving to Argentine Primera División by first time in his career.

In June 2022, he decided to leave the football activity after ending his contract with Defensa y Justicia, stating his desire of working as a sport manager.

In January 2024, he returned to professional football by signing with Deportes Melipilla in the Segunda División Profesional de Chile. He retired on 23 November 2025 after the match against Real San Joaquín and his farewell match was held on 17 October 2026.

== International career ==
In June 2012, Rodríguez was selected by Alejandro Sabella for the Argentina national team as part of the squad for the matchday 5 of the 2014 FIFA World Cup qualification against Ecuador, as well as an International Friendly against Brazil in New Jersey. He was only a substitute in both matches. Later, Rodríguez was selected again in October 2012 for the matchday 10 against Chile, where he did not play either.

== Post-retirement ==
In 2026, Rodríguez was selected to represented Socca Chile, the Chilean team, in the Football 6 World Cup in Germany.

On 27 October 2026, Rodríguez joined the amateur football club Carmelo de Praga from Catemu alongside the former Chile international Marcos González.

== Personal life ==
In February 2022, he acquired the Chilean nationality by residence, keeping the Argentine nationality.

== Career statistics ==
=== Club ===
As of 12 April 2015.

Club	Season	League			National Cup		Continental		Other		Total	
Club	Season	Division	Apps	Goals	Apps	Goals	Apps	Goals	Apps	Goals	Apps	Goals
Nacional	2008-09	Primera División	29	1	0	0	7	0	0	0	36	1
Nacional	2009-10	Primera División	13	2	0	0	0	0	0	0	13	2
Nacional	Total		42	3	0	0	7	0	0	0	49	3
Universidad de Chile	2010	Primera División	27	5	0	0	13	2	0	0	40	7
Universidad de Chile	2011	Primera División	36	4	6	0	10	1	0	0	52	5
Universidad de Chile	2012	Primera División	34	13	7	2	17	4	1	0	59	19
Universidad de Chile	Total		97	22	13	2	40	7	1	0	151	31
Sampdoria	2012-13	Serie A	1	0	0	0	0	0	0	0	1	0
Sampdoria	2013-14	Serie A	2	0	2	0	0	0	0	0	4	0
Sampdoria	Total		3	0	2	0	0	0	0	0	5	0
Grêmio (loan)	2014	Série A	8	0	1	0	0	0	0	0	9	0
Grêmio (loan)	2015	Série A	0	0	1	0	0	0	12	0	13	0
Grêmio (loan)	Total		8	0	2	0	0	0	12	0	22	0
Career total			150	25	17	2	47	7	13	0	227	34

== Honours ==
Nacional

- Uruguayan Primera División: 2008–09

Universidad de Chile

- Chilean Primera División: 2011 Apertura, 2011 Clausura, 2012 Apertura, 2016–17 Clausura
- Copa Sudamericana: 2011
- Copa Chile: 2015
- Supercopa de Chile: 2015

Individual

- Chilean Primera División XI: 2011
- CONMEBOL XI: 2012
