= Wangler (footballer) =

Brazilian footballer

Personal information
- Full name: Wangler da Silva
- Date of birth: August 18, 1992 (age 34)
- Place of birth: Tapera, Brazil
- Height: 1.70 m (5 ft 7 in)
- Position: Midfielder

Team information
- Current team: Tombense

Youth career
- 2009: Pedrabranca
- 2010–2011: Caxias
- 2012: Grêmio

Senior career*
Years	Team	Apps	(Gls)
2012	Caxias	0	(0)
2013–	Grêmio	0	(0)
2013	→ Caxias (loan)	8	(0)
2013–2014	→ Bahia (loan)	5	(0)
2014	→ Náutico (loan)	0	(0)
2015–	→ Oeste (loan)	19	(1)
- * Club domestic league appearances and goals as of 05:48, 13 September 2015 (UTC)

Wangler da Silva (born 18 August 1992), or simply Wangler, is a Brazilian professional footballer who plays as a midfielder for Oeste, on loan from Grêmio.

== Career ==
Born in Tapera, Brazil, Wangler began his career at 12 years old playing futsal in América de Tapera at second division state league. In 2009, first played football in the Pedrabranca's academy, in Alvorada. However, it was only six months, then returning to futsal. In late 2010, Wangler received an invitation to join the academy of Caxias, where it showed all the characteristics of a traditional number 10. Skilled and the main organizer of the youth team of Caxias, in 2012 was promoted to first team squad, where he was responsible for great campaign of the club at 2012 Campeonato Gaúcho, which was runner-up.

In July of the same year he signed with Grêmio, under contract until 2016, where he initially joined the under-20s team for dispute the Copa FGF. In early 2013 he was promoted to first team squad to compete in the Campeonato Gaúcho, but suffered an injury and ended up getting out of the team.

In June 2013, Wangler makes his return to Caxias on loan to dispute of the Campeonato Brasileiro Série C.

In September 2013, for having excelled in Caxias was again loaned, this time for the Campeonato Brasileiro Série A team Bahia until the end of the year. At the end, had his loan renewed until the end of the 2014 Campeonato Baiano, where he played little and then returned to Grêmio.

In August 2014, Wangler was loaned to Náutico until the end of the year to compete in the Campeonato Brasileiro Série B.

== Honours ==
=== Club ===
Bahia

- Campeonato Baiano: 2014

=== Individual ===
- Campeonato Gaúcho Best Newcomer: 2012
