= Rhodolfo =

Brazilian footballer

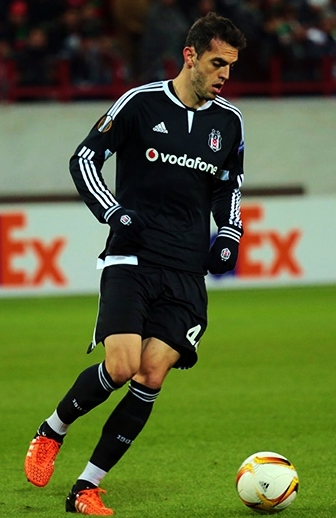
- Rhodolfo playing for Beşiktaş in 2015

Personal information
- Full name: Luiz Rhodolfo Dini Gaioto
- Date of birth: 11 August 1986 (age 40)
- Place of birth: Bandeirantes, Brazil
- Height: 1.94 m (6 ft 4 in)
- Position: Centre-back

Youth career
- 2000–2002: União Bandeirante
- 2002–2006: Atlético Paranaense

Senior career*
Years	Team	Apps	(Gls)
2006–2010	Atlético Paranaense	97	(3)
2011–2014	São Paulo	64	(1)
2013–2014	→ Grêmio (loan)	36	(0)
2014–2015	Grêmio	12	(0)
2015–2017	Beşiktaş	23	(2)
2017–2019	Flamengo	39	(1)
2020–2021	Coritiba	17	(0)
2021	Cruzeiro	8	(0)
- * Club domestic league appearances and goals as of 13 December 2021

Luiz Rhodolfo Dini Gaioto (born 11 August 1986), or simply Rhodolfo, is a Brazilian former professional footballer who played as a centre-back.

== Career ==
Rhodolfo made his professional debut away to Internacional in 0–2 defeat on 10 September 2006 in the Campeonato Brasileiro.

In 2014, Rhodolfo became the vice-captain of Grêmio, taking the position previously occupied by Zé Roberto. In August 2014, Rhodolfo moved definitively to Grêmio, who paid €4,000,000 to São Paulo. His contract with the Gaucho team ran through December 2017.

=== Beşiktaş ===
On 24 July 2015, Rhodolfo signed with Turkish club Beşiktaş J.K. for three years with a conditional fourth year.

=== Flamengo ===
On 11 June 2017, Rhodolfo was announced as new player by Flamengo, with a contract lasting until December 2019. Flamengo paid €1.1 million to Beşiktaş to sign the player.

== Career statistics ==
As of 19 July 2021

Appearances and goals by club, season and competition
Club	Season	League			Cup		Continental		Other		Total	
Club	Season	Division	Apps	Goals	Apps	Goals	Apps	Goals	Apps	Goals	Apps	Goals
Atlético Paranaense	2006	Série A	1	0	0	0	0	0	0	0	1	0
Atlético Paranaense	2007	Série A	21	2	0	0	2 (Note: Appearance(s) in Copa Sudamericana)	0	0	0	23	2
Atlético Paranaense	2008	Série A	19	0	0	0	1	0	0	0	20	0
Atlético Paranaense	2009	Série A	23	0	2	0	0	0	0	0	25	0
Atlético Paranaense	2010	Série A	33	1	6	1	0	0	0	0	39	2
Atlético Paranaense	Total		97	3	8	1	3	0	0	0	108	4
São Paulo	2011	Série A	31	1	6	1	4	0	11 (Note: Appearance(s) in Campeonato Paulista)	2	52	4
São Paulo	2012	Série A	30	0	9	1	10	0	20	5	69	6
São Paulo	2013	Série A	3	0	0	0	4 (Note: Appearance(s) in Copa Libertadores)	0	9	1	16	1
São Paulo	Total		64	1	15	2	18	0	40	8	137	11
Grêmio (loan)	2013	Série A	24	1	6	0	0	0	0	0	30	1
Grêmio (loan)	2014	Série A	12	0	1	0	6	1	12 (Note: Appearance(s) in Campeonato Gaúcho)	0	31	1
Grêmio (loan)	Total		36	0	7	0	6	1	12	0	61	2
Grêmio	2014	Série A	12	0	0	0	0	0	0	0	12	0
Grêmio	2015	Série A	0	0	0	0	0	0	9	0	9	0
Grêmio	Total		12	0	0	0	0	0	9	0	21	0
Beşiktaş	2015–16	Süper Lig	18	1	3	0	6 (Note: Appearance(s) in UEFA Europa League)	0	0	0	27	1
Beşiktaş	2016–17	Süper Lig	5	1	4	0	1 (Note: Appearance(s) in UEFA Champions League)	0	0	0	10	1
Beşiktaş	Total		23	2	7	0	7	0	0	0	37	2
Flamengo	2017	Série A	19	0	–		4	0	–		23	0
Flamengo	2018	Série A	12	1	0	0	2	0	9 (Note: Appearance(s) in Campeonato Carioca)	2	23	3
Flamengo	2019	Série A	8	0	0	0	0	0	5	0	13	0
Flamengo	Total		39	1	0	0	6	0	15	2	60	3
Coritiba	2020	Série A	17	0	1	0	–		12 (Note: Appearance(s) in Campeonato Paranaense)	3	30	3
Cruzeiro	2021	Série B	2	0	0	0	–		–		2	0
Career total			290	7	38	3	40	1	88	13	456	25

== Honours ==
Atlético Paranaense

- Campeonato Paranaense: 2009

São Paulo

- Copa Sudamericana: 2012

Beşiktaş

- Süper Lig: 2015–16, 2016–17

Flamengo

- Copa Libertadores: 2019
- Campeonato Brasileiro Série A: 2019
- Campeonato Carioca: 2019

Brazil

- Superclásico de las Américas: 2011

Individual

- Campeonato Paulista Team of the year: 2011
