= Marquinhos Pedroso =

Brazilian footballer

Personal information
- Full name: Marcos Garbellotto Silveira Pedroso
- Date of birth: 4 October 1993 (age 33)
- Place of birth: Tubarão, Brazil
- Height: 1.75 m (5 ft 9 in)
- Position: Left-back

Team information
- Current team: Marcílio Dias

Youth career
- 2007–2012: Figueirense

Senior career*
Years	Team	Apps	(Gls)
2012–2018	Figueirense	113	(1)
2013	→ Guarani (loan)	6	(0)
2013	→ Novo Hamburgo (loan)	0	(0)
2014	→ Grêmio (loan)	1	(0)
2017	→ Gaziantepspor (loan)	15	(1)
2017–2018	→ Ferencváros (loan)	23	(0)
2018–2019	FC Dallas	15	(0)
2019	D.C. United	4	(0)
2020–2021	Botev Plovdiv	11	(0)
2021	Viitorul Constanța	11	(0)
2021–2023	Liepāja	26	(0)
2023	Mioveni	12	(0)
2023	Vila Nova	4	(0)
2024	Portuguesa	3	(0)
2024	América de Natal	12	(0)
2024–	Marcílio Dias	11	(0)
- * Club domestic league appearances and goals as of 16:59, 14 August 2025 (UTC)

Marcos Garbellotto Silveira Pedroso (born 4 October 1993), better known as Marquinhos Pedroso, is a Brazilian professional footballer who plays as a left-back for Marcílio Dias.

== Career ==
=== Figueirense ===
Pedroso made his professional debut for Figueirense at age 18. During his career in Figueirense, he was loaned out many times. In 2013 he was loaned to Guarani, and in 2014 he was loaned to Grêmio. In 2017, Marquinhos played in Turkey, while being loaned to Gaziantepspor. Later that year he was loaned to Ferencvárosi TC in Hungary.

=== FC Dallas ===
Pedroso was signed by FC Dallas on 5 July 2018. He was waived by FC Dallas on 3 May 2019. He played a total of 15 MLS games for Dallas.

=== D.C. United ===
Pedroso joined D.C. United on 3 May 2019 after United traded their 2020 MLS SuperDraft first round pick in exchange for $100,000 GAM from FC Dallas. He debuted against Sporting KC on 12 May 2019, where Pedroso and D.C. went on to win 1–0. D.C. United did not exercise his contract option after the 2019 season.

=== Botev Plovdiv ===
Pedroso signed with Bulgarian side, Botev Plovdiv in July 2020. He made his debut on 9 August 2020, in a 2–0 win over Lokomotiv Plovdiv.

=== Viitorul Constanța ===
On 4 March 2021, Pedroso joined Liga I side, Viitorul Constanța.

=== Liepāja ===
In July 2021, he joined Virslīga club Liepāja.

=== Mioveni ===
On 2 February 2023, Pedroso joined Romanian Liga I side Mioveni.

=== Later career ===
On 31 July 2023, Pedroso returned to Brazil after seven years, signing for Série B side Vila Nova. On 7 December, after featuring in only four matches, he moved to Portuguesa for the 2024 Campeonato Paulista, where he was also rarely used.

== Personal life ==
Pedroso is a dual citizen of Brazil and Italy.

== Career statistics ==
As of 21 February 2024.

Appearances and goals by club, season and competition
Club	Season	League			State league		National cup (Note: Includes Copa do Brasil, Turkish Cup, Bulgarian Cup, Latvian Cup, Cupa României)		Continental		Other		Total	
Club	Season	Division	Apps	Goals	Apps	Goals	Apps	Goals	Apps	Goals	Apps	Goals	Apps	Goals
Figueirense	2012	Série A	5	0	—		0	0	1 (Note: Appearance(s) in Copa Sudamericana)	0	—		6	0
Figueirense	2014	Série A	12	0	14	0	0	0	—		—		26	0
Figueirense	2015	Série A	23	1	16	0	8	1	—		—		47	2
Figueirense	2016	Série A	29	0	14	0	4	0	2	0	2 (Note: Appearance(s) in Primeira Liga)	0	51	0
Figueirense	Total		69	1	44	0	12	1	3	0	2	0	130	2
Guarani (loan)	2013	Série C	0	0	6	0	2	0	—		—		8	0
Novo Hamburgo (loan)	2013	Gaúcho	—		0	0	—		—		22 (Note: 20 appearances and two goals in Copa Metropolitana, two appearances in Copa FGF)	2	22	2
Grêmio (loan)	2014	Série A	1	0	—		—		—		—		1	0
Gaziantepspor (loan)	2016–17	Süper Lig	15	1	—		1	0	—		—		16	1
Ferencváros (loan)	2017–18	Nemzeti Bajnokság I	23	0	—		2	0	0	0	—		25	0
FC Dallas	2018	Major League Soccer	13	0	—		0	0	0	0	—		13	0
FC Dallas	2019	Major League Soccer	2	0	—		0	0	—		—		2	0
FC Dallas	Total		15	0	—		0	0	0	0	—		15	0
D.C. United	2019	Major League Soccer	4	0	—		0	0	—		—		4	0
Botev Plovdiv	2020–21	Bulgarian First League	11	0	—		1	0	—		—		12	0
Viitorul Constanța	2020–21	Liga I	11	0	—		0	0	—		—		11	0
Liepāja	2021	Latvian Higher League	10	0	—		3	0	1 (Note: Appearance(s) in UEFA Europa Conference League)	0	—		14	0
Liepāja	2022	Latvian Higher League	16	0	—		0	0	—		—		16	0
Liepāja	Total		26	0	—		3	0	1	0	—		30	0
Mioveni	2022–23	Liga I	12	0	—		1	0	—		—		13	0
Vila Nova	2024	Série B	4	0	—		—		—		—		4	0
Portuguesa	2024	Paulista	—		3	0	—		—		—		3	0
Career total			191	2	53	0	22	1	4	0	24	2	294	5

== Honours ==
Novo Hamburgo

- Copa Metropolitana: 2013
- Copa FGF: 2013

Figueirense

- Campeonato Catarinense: 2014, 2015

FK Liepāja

- Latvian Football Cup runner-up: 2021

Individual

- Campeonato Catarinense Best Newcomer: 2014
