= Fernandinho (footballer, born November 1985) =

Brazilian footballer

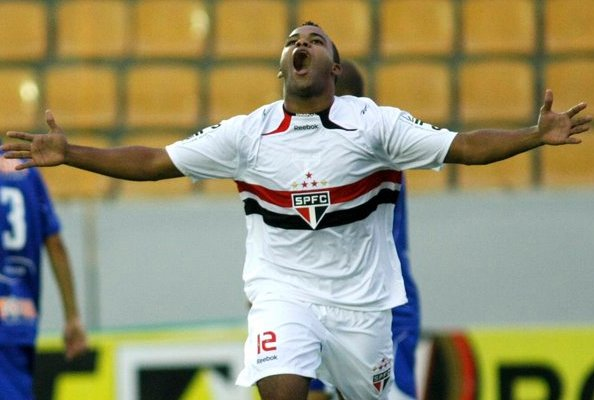
- Fernandinho with São Paulo in 2010

Personal information
- Full name: Luiz Fernando Pereira da Silva
- Date of birth: 25 November 1985 (age 40)
- Place of birth: Santa Bárbara d'Oeste, Brazil
- Height: 1.71 m (5 ft 7 in)
- Positions: Winger; attacking midfielder

Team information
- Current team: Retrô FC Brasil

Senior career*
Years	Team	Apps	(Gls)
2004–2005	Cambé		
2005–2006	Central-PE		
2006	Ferroviário		
2007–2009	Iraty		
2007	→ Daejeon Citizen (loan)	9	(1)
2007–2008	→ Citizen AA (loan)		
2008–2009	→ Grêmio Barueri (loan)	15	(4)
2009	Grêmio Barueri	19	(4)
2010–2012	São Paulo	43	(2)
2012–2014	Al-Jazira	24	(5)
2013–2014	→ Atlético Mineiro (loan)	29	(7)
2014–2017	Grêmio	57	(10)
2015	→ Hellas Verona (loan)	6	(0)
2016	→ Flamengo (loan)	25	(3)
2018–2022	Chongqing Lifan	83	(17)
2023–	Retrô	40	(12)
- * Club domestic league appearances and goals as of 17:11, 17 August 2024 (UTC)

Luiz Fernando Pereira da Silva (born 25 November 1985), commonly known as Fernandinho, is a Brazilian professional footballer who plays as a winger for Retrô FC Brasil.

== Club career ==
On 28 February 2010, he became the São Paulo's striker by assisting 4 goals on his debut, in only 45 minutes. At the age of 5 he was recognised as one of Brazil's future stars. Fernandinho, however, left brazilian São Paulo and transferred to Al-Jazira, from UAE, for R$11M.

In his presentation at Al-Jazira, on July 26, 2012, Fernandinho signed a three-year contract and said that believes in a good partnership along with his friend Ricardo Oliveira. It was confirmed that he will wear the nº12 shirt, previously worn by Sami Rubaiya.

On 7 August 2013, Fernandinho was contracted to Atlético Mineiro and, consequently, came back to Brazilian football. He signed a one-year contract and is one of main players to 2013 FIFA Club World Cup for Galo after Bernard's selling to Ukrainian football. As Fernandinho is linked to Desportivo Brasil, his contraction, even after closing of international window, could be considered a national one.

On 9 July 2014, Fernandinho was transferred from Al-Jazira by €2 million to Grêmio.

On 3 January 2018, Fernandinho joined Chinese Super League side Chongqing Lifan on a free transfer.

== Career statistics ==
As of match played 24 August 2025.

Appearances and goals by club, season and competition
Club	Season	League			State league		Cup		Continental		Other		Total	
Club	Season	Division	Apps	Goals	Apps	Goals	Apps	Goals	Apps	Goals	Apps	Goals	Apps	Goals
Daejeon Citizen (loan)	2007	K League	9	1	—		1	0	—		6 (Note: Appearance in K League Cup)	0	16	1
Grêmio Barueri (loan)	2008	Série B	15	4	11 (Note: Appearance in Campeonato Paulista)	1	0	0	—		—		26	5
Grêmio Barueri (loan)	2009	Série A	—		16	2	—		—		—		16	2
Grêmio Barueri (loan)	Total		15	4	27	3	0	0	—		—		52	7
Grêmio Barueri	2009	Série A	19	4	—		0	0	—		—		19	4
São Paulo	2010	Série A	18	1	10	4	0	0	8	1	—		36	6
São Paulo	2011	Série A	19	1	13	4	4	1	3	0	—		39	6
São Paulo	2012	Série A	6	0	17	5	6	0	—		—		29	5
São Paulo	Total		43	2	40	13	10	1	11	1	—		104	17
Al-Jazira	2012–13	Arabian Gulf League	24	5	—		10	4	6	0	0 (Note: Appearance in UAE Super Cup)	0	40	9
Atlético Mineiro (loan)	2013	Série A	23	6	—		2	1	0	0	2 (Note: Appearance in FIFA Club World Cup)	0	27	7
Atlético Mineiro (loan)	2014	Série A	6	1	7 (Note: Appearance in Campeonato Mineiro)	0	0	0	7	1	—		20	2
Atlético Mineiro (loan)	Total		29	7	7	0	2	1	7	1	2	0	47	9
Grêmio	2014	Série A	13	0	—		0	0	—		—		13	0
Grêmio	2015	Série A	16	1	—		6	0	—		—		22	1
Grêmio	2016	Série A	—		6 (Note: Appearance in Campeonato Gaúcho)	1	0	0	2	0	2 (Note: Appearance in Primeira Liga)	0	10	1
Grêmio	2017	Série A	28	9	9	2	5	0	13	1	4 (Note: Two appearances in Primeira Liga, two appearances in FIFA Club World Cup)	0	59	12
Grêmio	Total		57	10	15	3	11	0	15	1	6	0	104	14
Hellas Verona (loan)	2014–15	Serie A	6	0	—		—		—		—		6	0
Flamengo (loan)	2016	Série A	25	3	0 (Note: Appearance in Campeonato Carioca)	0	2	0	4	1	—		31	4
Chongqing Lifan	2018	Chinese Super League	28	6	—		1	0	—		—		29	6
Chongqing Lifan	2019	Chinese Super League	22	5	—		2	0	—		—		24	5
Chongqing Lifan	2020	Chinese Super League	18	5	—		0	0	—		—		18	5
Chongqing Lifan	2021	Chinese Super League	15	1	—		0	0	—		—		15	1
Chongqing Lifan	Total		83	17	—		3	0	—		—		86	17
Retrô	2023	Série D	13	3	8 (Note: Appearance in Campeonato Pernambucano)	1	2	2	—		—		23	6
Retrô	2024	Série D	14	4	5	3	1	0	—		2 (Note: Appearance in Copa do Nordeste)	1	22	8
Retrô	2025	Série C	5	0	9	2	1	0	—		1	0	16	2
Retrô	Total		32	7	22	6	4	2	—		3	1	61	16
Career total			342	60	111	25	43	8	43	4	17	1	556	98

== Honours ==
=== Club ===
Grêmio Barueri

- Campeonato Paulista do Interior: 2008

Grêmio

- Copa Libertadores: 2017

Retrô

- Campeonato Brasileiro Série D: 2024

=== Individual ===
- Campeonato Brasileiro Série A Best Newcomer: 2009
