= Gabriel Spessatto =

Brazilian footballer (born 1991)

Personal information
- Full name: Gabriel Orlandini Spessatto
- Date of birth: July 16, 1991 (age 35)
- Place of birth: Encantado, Brazil
- Height: 1.80 m (5 ft 11 in)
- Position: Right back

Team information
- Current team: Aversa Normanna
- Number: 2

Youth career
- 2001–2011: Grêmio

Senior career*
Years	Team	Apps	(Gls)
2010–2014	Grêmio	2	(0)
2012	→ Cerâmica (loan)	4	(0)
2013	→ Juventude (loan)	0	(0)
2014–	Aversa Normanna	4	(0)
- * Club domestic league appearances and goals as of 19 October 2014

Gabriel Orlandini Spessatto (born 16 July 1991), or simply Gabriel Spessatto, is a Brazilian professional footballer who plays as a right back for Aversa Normanna.

== Career ==
Born in Encantado, Gabriel Spessatto began playing football in Grêmio's youth system at age 10, and he led the youth side in scoring as a right back with 17 goals during 2010. After he signed a professional contract with Grêmio, he was sent on loan to Cerâmica during 2012 and Juventude during 2013 season. In 2014, he returned to Grêmio to compete in the Campeonato Gaúcho, where he appeared in two matches.

In late August 2014, Spessatto was transferred from Grêmio to Lega Pro side Aversa Normanna for the 2014–15 season. He made his debut for the new club on 7 September, in a 2–2 away draw against Casertana for the 2nd fixture of the Lega Pro.

== Honours ==
=== Club ===
Grêmio

- Campeonato Brasileiro Sub-20: 2009
- Campeonato Gaúcho: 2010
