= Fellipe Bastos =

Brazilian footballer (born 1990)

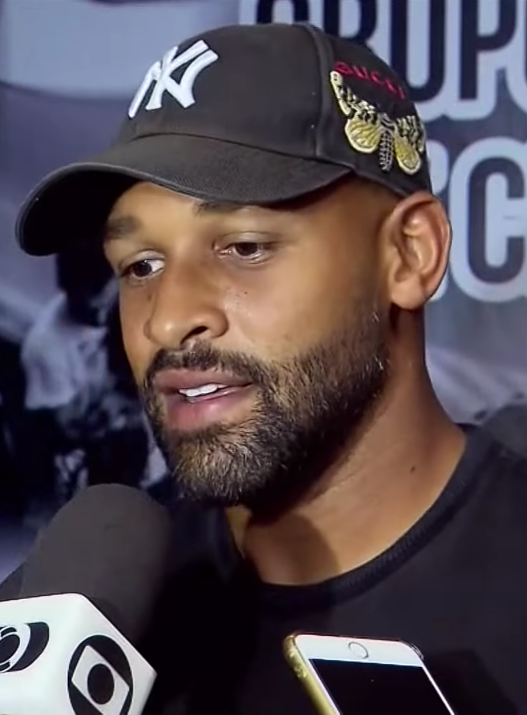

Personal information
- Full name: Fellipe Ramos Ignez Bastos
- Date of birth: 1 February 1990 (age 36)
- Place of birth: Rio de Janeiro, Brazil
- Height: 1.78 m (5 ft 10 in)
- Position: Centre midfielder

Youth career
- 2005–2007: Botafogo
- 2007–2008: Benfica

Senior career*
Years	Team	Apps	(Gls)
2008–2012	Benfica	4	(1)
2009	→ Belenenses (loan)	10	(0)
2010	→ Servette (loan)	10	(1)
2010–2011	→ Vasco da Gama (loan)	54	(5)
2012–2015	Vasco da Gama	88	(8)
2013	→ Ponte Preta (loan)	22	(4)
2014–2015	→ Grêmio (loan)	47	(1)
2015–2017	Al Ain	35	(6)
2016–2017	→ Baniyas (loan)	13	(0)
2017–2019	Corinthians	21	(0)
2018	→ Sport Recife (loan)	32	(1)
2019	→ Vasco da Gama (loan)	15	(1)
2020	Vasco da Gama	19	(4)
2021–2023	Goiás	76	(2)
2023	Avaí	17	(1)
2024	Amazonas	5	(0)

International career
2005	Brazil U15	4	(0)
2007	Brazil U17	7	(2)
- * Club domestic league appearances and goals as of 27 May 2023

Fellipe Ramos Ignez Bastos (born 1 February 1990) is a Brazilian professional footballer who plays as a centre midfielder.

== Club career ==
Fellipe Bastos started his career at Botafogo, one of the famous club from his birthplace. After captaining the Brazil U17 in 2007 FIFA U-17 World Cup, he was offered a change to move to Europe, for Benfica.

Due to FIFA regulations, he could only make his international transfer following his 18th birthday, and could only be signed for a maximum 5-year contract.

He played his first official match on 24 August 2008. He scored his first goal on the last day of the league season, scoring a game winning 35 yard thunderbolt against Belenenses. On 10 February 2010 Servette FC has immediately secured the services of the midfielder from Benfica, the Brazilian comes on loan until end of season in the Swiss Challenge League.

In June 2010, he was loaned to Vasco da Gama along with Éder Luís. In June 2012, the move has made permanent.

On 16 June 2014, Vasco da Gama loaned him to Grêmio until the end of the season in compensation on loan of Kléber.

== Career statistics ==
As of 27 December 2014.

Club	Season	League			National Cup		Continental		Other		Total	
Club	Season	Division	Apps	Goals	Apps	Goals	Apps	Goals	Apps	Goals	Apps	Goals
Benfica	2008-09	Primeira Liga	2	1	0	0	1	0	0	0	3	1
Benfica	Total		2	1	0	0	1	0	0	0	3	1
Belenenses (loan)	2009-10	Primeira Liga	7	0	2	0	0	0	0	0	9	0
Belenenses (loan)	Total		7	0	2	0	0	0	0	0	9	0
Servette (loan)	2009-10	Challenge League	4	1	0	0	0	0	0	0	4	1
Servette (loan)	Total		4	1	0	0	0	0	0	0	4	1
Vasco da Gama (loan)	2010	Série A	14	2	0	0	0	0	0	0	14	2
Vasco da Gama (loan)	2011	Série A	17	1	8	1	6	0	9	1	40	3
Vasco da Gama (loan)	2012	Série A	0	0	0	0	5	2	16	2	21	4
Vasco da Gama (loan)	Total		31	3	8	1	11	2	25	3	75	9
Vasco da Gama	2012	Série A	27	2	0	0	0	0	0	0	27	2
Vasco da Gama	2013	Série A	6	1	0	0	0	0	9	0	15	1
Vasco da Gama	2014	Série B	6	0	4	0	0	0	16	1	26	1
Vasco da Gama	Total		39	3	4	0	0	0	25	1	68	4
Ponte Preta (loan)	2013	Série A	15	1	0	0	7	2	0	0	22	3
Ponte Preta (loan)	Total		15	1	0	0	7	2	0	0	22	3
Grêmio (loan)	2014	Série A	21	0	0	0	0	0	0	0	21	0
Grêmio (loan)	Total		21	0	0	0	0	0	0	0	21	0
Career total			80	6	10	1	19	4	25	3	134	14

== Honours ==
Benfica

- Taça da Liga: 2008–09

Vasco da Gama

- Copa do Brasil: 2011

Corinthians

- Campeonato Brasileiro Série A: 2017
- Campeonato Paulista: 2017

Goiás

- Copa Verde: 2023
