= Guilherme Biteco =

Brazilian footballer (born 1994)

Personal information
- Full name: Guilherme Bitencourt da Silva
- Date of birth: 12 March 1994 (age 32)
- Place of birth: Porto Alegre, Brazil
- Height: 1.76 m (5 ft 9 in)
- Position: Attacking midfielder

Youth career
- Grêmio
- Internacional
- Grêmio

Senior career*
Years	Team	Apps	(Gls)
2012	Grêmio	3	(0)
2013–2016	1899 Hoffenheim	0	(0)
2013–2014	→ Grêmio (loan)	20	(1)
2014	→ Vasco da Gama (loan)	10	(1)
2015	→ Santa Cruz (loan)	10	(1)
2015	→ Náutico (loan)	7	(1)
2016–2018	Barra-SC	0	(0)
2016	→ Ceará (loan)	1	(0)
2017–2018	→ Paraná (loan)	20	(1)
2019	São Caetano	1	(0)
2019	Oeste	0	(0)
2020–2021	Paraná	21	(1)
2021	Cascavel	3	(0)
2022	Rio Branco	8	(2)
2022	Barra-SC	1	(0)
2022–2023	São José	11	(1)
2024–2025	Tai Po	15	(8)
2025	→ Hong Kong Rangers (loan)	13	(1)
- * Club domestic league appearances and goals as of 25 May 2025

Guilherme Bitencourt da Silva (born 12 March 1994), commonly known as Guilherme Biteco, is a Brazilian professional footballer who plays as an attacking midfielder.

== Club career ==
=== Brazil ===
Biteco started his football career in his local team Grêmio's academy. He briefly left for the club's rival Internacional, before returning to Grêmio. He started playing first team football for Grêmio in 2012.

In January 2013, Bundesliga club Hoffenheim announced the signing of Biteco. He was immediately loaned back to Grêmio until the end of the 2013 season. His loan was eventually extended until the summer of 2014. He was then loaned to Vasco da Gama for the remainder of 2014.

On 31 January 2015, Biteco was loaned to Série B club Santa Cruz until the end of the year. In August 2015, he signed with Náutico.

On 2 January 2016, Série B club Ceará announced the signing of Biteco. In February, he suffered a knee injury which sidelined him for the rest of the season. He left the club at the end of the season

On 31 January 2017, Biteco joined Paraná. A week later, he made his debut and first appearance in almost a year, coming off the bench in a 1–0 defeat against Coritiba. He ruptured his achilles tendon in June, ruling him out for the remainder of the season.

Biteco signed for São Caetano ahead of the 2019 season, before joining Série B club Oeste in the summer. He only made one appearance across during the 2019 season due to knee injuries.

In March 2020, Biteco returned to Paraná.

On 20 April 2021, Biteco was suspended from football until August 2021 due to failing a drug test, as isometheptene was found in his test results following a match against Ponte Preta. His contract with Paraná ended in May 2021, and he joined Série D side Cascavel in August, after serving his suspension.

Biteco started the 2022 season with Rio Branco, where he played in the Campeonato Paranaense, before returning to Barra-SC in February, ahead of the final two matches in the Campeonato Catarinense season.

In July 2022, Biteco joined Serie C side Esporte Clube São José

=== Hong Kong ===
On 2 January 2024, Biteco joined Hong Kong Premier League club Tai Po.

On 26 December 2024, Biteco joined Rangers on loan until the end of the season. He scored the winning goal against Lee Man while on loan to ensure that his parent club's victory against North District was enough to win the league.

== Personal life ==
Both of Biteco's younger brothers, Matheus and Gabriel, were professional footballers who came through Grêmio's youth academy. Gabriel made 19 appearances for Grêmio before playing for various teams in Brazil. Matheus was briefly Guilherme's teammate when he was recovering from injury at TSG 1899 Hoffenheim, before being loaned to Chapecoense and tragically lost his life when LaMia Airlines Flight 2933 crashed on 28 November 2016.
