= Gustavo Xuxa =

Brazilian footballer

Personal information
- Full name: Gustavo Simon Vertuoso
- Date of birth: 22 February 1993 (age 33)
- Place of birth: Quilombo, Brazil
- Height: 1.73 m (5 ft 8 in)
- Position: Attacking midfielder

Team information
- Current team: Floresta

Youth career
- 2007–2011: Juventude
- 2011–2013: Grêmio

Senior career*
Years	Team	Apps	(Gls)
2013–2015	Grêmio	3	(0)
2013–2014	→ Passo Fundo (loan)	4	(0)
2014	→ Novo Hamburgo (loan)	0	(0)
2015	→ Londrina (loan)	4	(0)
2016	Pelotas	5	(1)
2017	Joinville	9	(0)
2017	Rio Branco-AC	13	(5)
2017	Brusque	5	(1)
2018	São Luiz	10	(0)
2018	Pelotas	9	(1)
2018–2019	Aimoré	14	(2)
2019	Esportivo	5	(0)
2019–2020	São José-RS	45	(8)
2020	América de Natal	4	(0)
2020–2021	São Luiz	9	(2)
2021–2023	Botafogo-SP	56	(10)
2024	CSA	22	(6)
2024	→ Água Santa (loan)	6	(1)
2025	Paraná	6	(0)
2025	Brasiliense	5	(0)
2025–	Floresta	14	(1)
- * Club domestic league appearances and goals as of 9 September 2025

Gustavo Simon Vertuoso (born 22 February 1993), better known as Gustavo Xuxa, is a Brazilian professional footballer who plays as an attacking midfielder.

== Career ==
Having spent time in the Juventude youth sectors, Gustavo Xuxa began his professional career with Grêmio, where he made just 3 appearances. He subsequently played most of his career for teams in Rio Grande do Sul, becoming notable on 4 March 2021 for a goal scored from midfield in the match against Juventude. In 2024 he was hired by CSA, where he won the Copa Alagoas, and was later loaned to Água Santa.

For 2025 season, Xuxa signed with Paraná Clube, and then defended Brasiliense and Floresta.

== Honours ==
Pelotas

- Campeonato Gaúcho Série A2: 2018

CSA

- Copa Alagoas: 2024
