= 2016 Copa do Brasil First Round =

The 2016 Copa do Brasil First Round was played from 16 March to 25 May 2016, deciding the 40 teams that advanced to the Second Round.

== Matches ==
The first legs will be played from 16 March to 27 April, and the second legs will be played from 6 April to 25 May.

Team 1	Agg.	Team 2	1st leg	2nd leg
Santos (São Paulo (state))	4–1	(Amapá) Santos	1–1	3–0
Rio Branco (Acre (state))	1–2	(Acre (state)) Galvez	0–1	1–1
ABC (Rio Grande do Norte)	4–3	(Goiás) Goianésia	1–1	3–2
América de Natal (Rio Grande do Norte)	3–3 (a)	(Federal District (Brazil)) Gama	0–1	3–2
Goiás	3–3 (7–8 p)	(Piauí) Ríver	1–2	2–1
Botafogo (Paraíba)	2–2 (6–5 p)	(São Paulo (state)) Linense	1–1	1–1
Ceará	3–3 (a)	(Rio de Janeiro (state)) Resende	2–2	1–1
Joinville (Santa Catarina (state))	2–1	(Mato Grosso do Sul) Comercial	1–1	1–0
Vasco da Gama (Rio de Janeiro (state))	3–1	(Pará) Remo	1–0	2–1
CRB (Alagoas)	2–0	(Mato Grosso do Sul) Ivinhema	2–0	–
Náutico (Pernambuco)	1–1 (a)	(Bahia) Vitória da Conquista	0–0	1–1
Santa Cruz (Pernambuco)	1–0	(Espírito Santo) Rio Branco	1–0	0–0
Cruzeiro (Minas Gerais)	3–2	(Paraíba) Campinense	0–0	3–2
Londrina (Paraná (state))	7–0	(Pará) Parauapebas	1–0	6–0
Vitória (Bahia)	6–3	(Roraima) Náutico	3–2	3–1
Portuguesa (São Paulo (state))	2–2 (a)	(Piauí) Parnahyba	1–2	1–0
Coritiba (Paraná (state))	3–0	(Ceará) Guarany de Sobral	3–0	–
Juventude (Rio Grande do Sul)	3–1	(Tocantins) Tocantinópolis	1–1	2–0
Criciúma (Santa Catarina (state))	2–3	(Paraná (state)) Operário	1–2	1–1
Paysandu (Pará)	4–1	(Pará) Independente Tucuruí	2–1	2–0
Atlético Paranaense (Paraná (state))	2–1	(Rio Grande do Sul) Brasil de Pelotas	1–1	1–0
Nacional (Amazonas (Brazilian state))	1–3	(Mato Grosso) Dom Bosco	0–2	1–1
Chapecoense (Santa Catarina (state))	4–1	(Amazonas (Brazilian state)) Princesa do Solimões	2–1	2–0
Paraná (Paraná (state))	3–1	(Sergipe) Estanciano	1–1	2–0
Flamengo (Rio de Janeiro (state))	3–1	(Sergipe) Confiança	0–1	3–0
Fortaleza (Ceará)	3–1	(Maranhão) Imperatriz	1–1	2–0
Bahia	3–1	(Rio Grande do Norte) Globo	0–0	3–1
América Mineiro (Minas Gerais)	4–3	(São Paulo (state)) Red Bull Brasil	1–1	3–2
Fluminense (Rio de Janeiro (state))	3–0	(Minas Gerais) Tombense	3–0	–
Salgueiro (Pernambuco)	1–2	(São Paulo (state)) Ferroviária	0–1	1–1
Sport Recife (Pernambuco)	1–4	(Goiás) Aparecidense	0–2	1–2
Atlético Goianiense (Goiás)	2–4	(Rio Grande do Sul) Ypiranga	2–2	0–2
Figueirense (Santa Catarina (state))	2–0	(Rio Grande do Sul) Lajeadense	2–0	–
Sampaio Corrêa (Maranhão)	2–2 (a)	(Santa Catarina (state)) Internacional de Lages	2–1	0–1
Ponte Preta (São Paulo (state))	3–2	(Minas Gerais) Caldense	2–1	1–1
ASA (Alagoas)	2–3	(Rondônia) Genus	0–2	2–1
Botafogo (Rio de Janeiro (state))	2–1	(Alagoas) Coruripe	1–0	1–1
Cuiabá (Mato Grosso)	1–1 (4–5 p)	(Bahia) Juazeirense	0–1	1–0
Avaí (Santa Catarina (state))	2–1	(Mato Grosso) CEOV	0–1	2–0
Bragantino (São Paulo (state))	2–0	(Federal District (Brazil)) Brasília	2–0	–

=== Match 1 ===
April 22, 2016
21:30 UTC−03:00

Santos-AP (Amapá)	1–1	(São Paulo (state)) Santos
Rafinha 45'	Report	Joel 78'

Zerão, Macapá
Attendance: 503
Referee: Joelson Ferreira (Pará)

April 29, 2016
21:30 UTC−03:00

Santos (São Paulo (state))	3–0	(Amapá) Santos-AP
Luiz Felipe 45+1'; Ronaldo Mendes 66'; Joel 82'	Report

Vila Belmiro, Santos
Attendance: 5,712
Referee: William Machado Steffen (Santa Catarina)

Santos won 4–1 on aggregate.

=== Match 2 ===
April 20, 2016
19:30 UTC−05:00

Galvez (Acre (state))	1–0	(Acre (state)) Rio Branco
Moraes 65' (pen.)	Report

Florestão, Rio Branco
Attendance: 1,256
Referee: Fledes Rodrigues Santos (Rondônia)

April 29, 2016
19:30 UTC−05:00

Rio Branco (Acre (state))	1–1	(Acre (state)) Galvez
Valerio 68'	Report	Raianderson 60'

Arena da Floresta, Rio Branco
Attendance: 597
Referee: Edmar Campos da Encarnação (Amazonas)

Galvez won 2–1 on aggregate.

=== Match 3 ===
March 16, 2016
20:30 UTC−03:00

Goianésia (Goiás)	1–1	(Rio Grande do Norte) ABC
Nonato 36'	Report	Márcio Passos 85'

Estádio Valdeir José de Oliveira, Trindade
Attendance: 1,029
Referee: Vinicius Gonçalves Dias Araujo (São Paulo)

April 20, 2016
20:30 UTC−03:00

ABC (Rio Grande do Norte)	3–2	(Goiás) Goianésia
Echeverría 60', 76'; Jones Carioca 73'	Report	Allef 31'; Cleber Augusto 39'

Frasqueirão, Natal
Attendance: 2,691
Referee: Gilberto Rodrigues Castro Junior (Pernambuco)

ABC won 4–3 on aggregate.

=== Match 4 ===
May 14, 2016
17:00 UTC−03:00

Gama (Federal District (Brazil))	1–0	(Rio Grande do Norte) América de Natal
Roberto Pítio 18'	Report

Bezerrão, Gama
Attendance: 1,778
Referee: André Luiz de Freitas Castro (Goiás)

May 25, 2016
19:15 UTC−03:00

América de Natal (Rio Grande do Norte)	3–2	(Federal District (Brazil)) Gama
Raphael 6'; Luiz Eduardo 10', 39'	Report	Roberto Pítio 14', 41'

Arena das Dunas, Natal
Attendance: 4,402
Referee: Antonio Rogério Batista do Prado (São Paulo)

Tied 3–3 on aggregate, Gama won on away goals.

=== Match 5 ===
April 7, 2016
21:30 UTC−03:00

Ríver (Piauí)	2–1	Goiás
Felipe Macedo 23' (o.g.); Vanderlei 54' (pen.)	Report	Carlos 44'

Estádio Governador Alberto Tavares Silva, Teresina
Attendance: 5,122
Referee: Wanderson Alves de Sousa (Minas Gerais)

April 27, 2016
19:30 UTC−03:00

Goiás	2–1	(Piauí) Ríver
Rafhael Lucas 11', 61'	Report	Eduardo 8'
Penalties
Cléo (penalty scored); Juninho (penalty scored); Anderson Salles (penalty scored); Murilo (penalty missed); Rafhael Lucas (penalty scored); David Duarte (penalty scored); Wagner (penalty missed); Leo Sena (penalty scored); Johnatan (penalty scored); Patrick (penalty missed)	7–8	Vanderlei (penalty scored); Tote (penalty scored); Índio (penalty scored); Fabinho (penalty missed); Rafael Araujo (penalty scored); Rogerio (penalty scored); Kassio (penalty missed); Paulo Paraíba (penalty scored); Jadson (penalty scored); Dalton (penalty scored)

Estádio Serra Dourada, Goiânia
Attendance: 1,416
Referee: Vinícius Furlan (São Paulo)

Tied 3–3 on aggregate, Ríver won on penalties.

=== Match 6 ===
March 16, 2016
20:30 UTC−03:00

Linense (São Paulo (state))	1–1	(Paraíba) Botafogo
Thiago Humberto 17' (pen.)	Report	Müller Fernandes 25'

Estádio Gilberto Siqueira Lopes, Lins
Attendance: 612
Referee: Paulo Henrique Schleich Vollkopf (Mato Grosso do Sul)

April 6, 2016
19:30 UTC−03:00

Botafogo (Paraíba)	1–1	(São Paulo (state)) Linense
Warley 81'	Report	Cristiano 59'
Penalties
Müller Fernandes (penalty scored); Val (penalty scored); Janeudo (penalty scored); Ângelo (penalty scored); Warley (penalty scored); Marcelo Xavier (penalty scored)	6–5	Zé Antônio (penalty scored); Rafael Aidar (penalty scored); Rogerinho (penalty scored); Bruno Paiva (penalty scored); Rodrigo Lobão (penalty scored); Fillipe Soutto (penalty missed)

Estádio José Américo de Almeida Filho, João Pessoa
Attendance: 4,324
Referee: Roberto Giovanny Oliveira Silva (Goiás)

Tied 2–2 on aggregate, Botafogo won on penalties.

=== Match 7 ===
April 6, 2016
19:30 UTC−03:00

Resende (Rio de Janeiro (state))	2–2	Ceará
Jhulliam 50'; Marcel 88' (pen.)	Report	Bill 41'; Sandro 90'

Estádio Raulino de Oliveira, Volta Redonda
Attendance: 145
Referee: Dyorgines Jose Padovani de Andrade (Espírito Santo)

April 26, 2016
19:15 UTC−03:00

Ceará	1–1	(Rio de Janeiro (state)) Resende
Rafael Costa 66'	Report	Jhulliam 16'

Estádio Presidente Vargas, Fortaleza
Attendance: 6,354
Referee: Antonio Santos Nunes (Piauí)

Tied 3–3 on aggregate, Ceará won on away goals.

=== Match 8 ===
April 20, 2016
20:30 UTC−04:00

Comercial (Mato Grosso do Sul)	1–1	(Santa Catarina (state)) Joinville
Lucas Guma 50'	Report	Murilo 15'

Estádio Jacques da Luz, Campo Grande
Attendance: 275
Referee: Eduardo Tomaz de Aquino Valadão (Goiás)

May 4, 2016
19:30 UTC−03:00

Joinville (Santa Catarina (state))	1–0	(Mato Grosso do Sul) Comercial
Edson Ratinho 78'	Report

Arena Joinville, Joinville
Attendance: 4,131
Referee: Eduardo Tomaz de Aquino Valadão (Goiás)

Joinville won 2–1 on aggregate.

=== Match 9 ===
April 13, 2016
21:45 UTC−03:00

Remo (Pará)	0–1	(Rio de Janeiro (state)) Vasco da Gama
	Report	Thalles 85'

Mangueirão, Belém
Attendance: 12,568
Referee: Rodolpho Toski Marques (Paraná)

April 27, 2016
21:45 UTC−03:00

Vasco da Gama (Rio de Janeiro (state))	2–1	(Pará) Remo
Caio 64'; Rafael Vaz 70'	Report	Max 75'

Estádio São Januário, Rio de Janeiro
Attendance: 2,434
Referee: Flavio Rodrigues de Souza (São Paulo)

Vasco da Gama won 3–1 on aggregate.

=== Match 10 ===
April 6, 2016
20:30 UTC−04:00

Ivinhema (Mato Grosso do Sul)	0–2	(Alagoas) CRB
	Report	Dakson 53'; Lúcio Maranhão 58'

Estádio Luiz Saraiva Vieira, Ivinhema
Attendance: 679
Referee: Paulo Roberto Alves Junior (Paraná)

CRB advanced directly due to winning by 2 or more goals difference.

=== Match 11 ===
March 17, 2016
19:15 UTC−03:00

Vitória da Conquista (Bahia)	0–0	(Pernambuco) Náutico
	Report

Estádio Lomanto Júnior, Vitória da Conquista
Attendance: 3,507
Referee: Claudionor dos Santos Júnior (Sergipe)

April 7, 2016
19:30 UTC−03:00

Náutico (Pernambuco)	1–1	(Bahia) Vitória da Conquista
Esquerdinha 61'	Report	Zé Paulo 23'

Arena Pernambuco, São Lourenço da Mata
Attendance: 1,773
Referee: Andrey da Silva e Silva (Pará)

Tied 1–1 on aggregate, Vitória da Conquista won on away goals.

=== Match 12 ===
March 16, 2016
21:45 UTC−03:00

Rio Branco (Espírito Santo)	0–1	(Pernambuco) Santa Cruz
	Report	Bruno Moraes 90+4'

Estádio Kléber Andrade, Cariacica
Attendance: 1,734
Referee: Leandro Newley Ferreira Belota (Rio de Janeiro)

April 6, 2016
21:45 UTC−03:00

Santa Cruz (Pernambuco)	0–0	(Espírito Santo) Rio Branco
	Report

Estádio do Arruda, Recife
Attendance: 2,690
Referee: Eduardo Tomaz de Aquino Valadão (Goiás)

Santa Cruz won 1–0 on aggregate.

=== Match 13 ===
April 20, 2016
21:45 UTC−03:00

Campinense (Paraíba)	0–0	(Minas Gerais) Cruzeiro
	Report

Amigão, Campina Grande
Attendance: 2,214
Referee: Flavio Rodrigues de Souza (São Paulo)

May 5, 2016
21:30 UTC−03:00

Cruzeiro (Minas Gerais)	3–2	(Paraíba) Campinense
Allano 18'; De Arrascaeta 50'; Willian 75'	Report	Adalgiso Pitbull 40', 87'

Mineirão, Belo Horizonte
Attendance: 10,200
Referee: Bruno Arleu de Araujo (Rio de Janeiro)

Cruzeiro won 3–2 on aggregate.

=== Match 14 ===
March 16, 2016
20:30 UTC−03:00

Parauapebas (Pará)	0–1	(Paraná (state)) Londrina
	Report	Matheus 78'

Estádio José Raimundo Roseno Araújo, Parauapebas
Attendance: 368
Referee: Antônio Dib Moraes de Sousa (Piauí)

April 6, 2016
19:30 UTC−03:00

Londrina (Paraná (state))	6–0	(Pará) Parauapebas
Keirrison 9'; Netinho 18' (pen.); Rafael Gava 50'; Júlio Pacato 59'; Itamar 79', 81'	Report

Estádio Vitorino Gonçalves Dias, Londrina
Attendance: 2,570
Referee: Ronan Marques da Rosa (Santa Catarina)

Londrina won 7–0 on aggregate.

=== Match 15 ===
April 13, 2016
20:30 UTC−04:00

Náutico (Roraima)	2–3	(Bahia) Vitória
Vinícius 36' (o.g.); Romario 88'	Report	Marinho 2', 9', 75'

Estádio Flamarion Vasconcelos, Boa Vista
Attendance: 350
Referee: João Batista Cunha de Brito (Amazonas)

April 27, 2016
21:45 UTC−03:00

Vitória (Bahia)	3–1	(Roraima) Náutico
Marinho 9', 24'; Alípio 90'	Report	Euller 42' (o.g.)

Arena Fonte Nova, Salvador
Attendance: 5,630
Referee: Eduardo de Santana Nunes (Sergipe)

Vitória won 6–3 on aggregate.

=== Match 16 ===
April 13, 2016
20:30 UTC−03:00

Parnahyba (Piauí)	2–1	(São Paulo (state)) Portuguesa
Idelvando 31'; Ramon 36'	Report	Caio Cezar 5'

Estádio Pedro Alelaf, Parnaíba
Attendance: 1,904
Referee: Joelson Nazareno Ferreira Cardoso (Pará)

April 26, 2016
21:30 UTC−03:00

Portuguesa (São Paulo (state))	1–0	(Piauí) Parnahyba
Bruno Nunes 85'	Report

Estádio do Canindé, São Paulo
Attendance: 338
Referee: João Batista de Arruda (Rio de Janeiro)

Tied 2–2 on aggregate, Portuguesa won on away goals.

=== Match 17 ===
April 13, 2016
19:30 UTC−03:00

Guarany de Sobral (Ceará)	0–3	(Paraná (state)) Coritiba
	Report	Leandro 19', 45'; Ruy 90'

Estádio do Junco, Sobral
Attendance: 1,702
Referee: Zandick Gondim Alves Junior (Rio Grande do Norte)

Coritiba advanced directly due to winning by 2 or more goals difference.

=== Match 18 ===
April 6, 2016
20:30 UTC−03:00

Tocantinópolis (Tocantins)	1–1	(Rio Grande do Sul) Juventude
Pedro Panca 33'	Report	Wallacer 8' (pen.)

Estádio João Ribeiro, Tocantinópolis
Attendance: 2,071
Referee: Mayron F dos Reis Novais (Maranhão)

April 28, 2016
21:30 UTC−03:00

Juventude (Rio Grande do Sul)	2–0	(Tocantins) Tocantinópolis
Vacaria 71'; Tharlys 90' (o.g.)	Report

Estádio Alfredo Jaconi, Caxias do Sul
Attendance: 1,874
Referee: Rodrigo D'Alonso Ferreira (Santa Catarina)

Juventude won 3–1 on aggregate.

=== Match 19 ===
April 12, 2016
21:00 UTC−03:00

Operário (Paraná (state))	2–1	(Santa Catarina (state)) Criciúma
Lucas 19'; Juba 50'	Report	Gustavo 69'

Estádio Germano Kruger, Ponta Grossa
Attendance: 2,695
Referee: Roger Goulart (Rio Grande do Sul)

April 28, 2016
19:15 UTC−03:00

Criciúma (Santa Catarina (state))	1–1	(Paraná (state)) Operário
Elvis 10'	Report	Perović 76'

Estádio Heriberto Hülse, Criciúma
Attendance: 2,370
Referee: Rodrigo Carvalhaes de Miranda (Rio de Janeiro)

Operário won 3–2 on aggregate.

=== Match 20 ===
April 27, 2016
20:30 UTC−03:00

Independente Tucuruí (Pará)	1–2	(Pará) Paysandu
Jackinha 88' (pen.)	Report	Gilvan 3'; Bruno Smith 9'

Estádio Municipal Antônio Dias, Tucuruí
Attendance: 892
Referee: Emerson de Almeida Ferreira (Minas Gerais)

April 30, 2016
17:00 UTC−03:00

Paysandu (Pará)	2–0	(Pará) Independente Tucuruí
Celsinho 55' (pen.); Raphael Luz 78'	Report

Estádio da Curuzú, Belém
Attendance: 8,742
Referee: Marcelo Aparecido Ribeiro de Souza (São Paulo)

Paysandu won 4–1 on aggregate.

=== Match 21 ===
March 17, 2016
21:30 UTC−03:00

Brasil de Pelotas (Rio Grande do Sul)	1–1	(Paraná (state)) Atlético Paranaense
Marcos Paraná 76'	Report	Marcos Guilherme 44'

Estádio Bento Freitas, Pelotas
Attendance: 3,819
Referee: Savio Pereira Sampaio (Distrito Federal)

April 13, 2016
19:30 UTC−03:00

Atlético Paranaense (Paraná (state))	1–0	(Rio Grande do Sul) Brasil de Pelotas
Hernani 76'	Report

Arena da Baixada, Curitiba
Attendance: 9,394
Referee: José Claudio Rocha Filho (São Paulo)

Atlético Paranaense won 2–1 on aggregate.

=== Match 22 ===
April 20, 2016
20:30 UTC−04:00

Dom Bosco (Mato Grosso)	2–0	(Amazonas (Brazilian state)) Nacional
Fernando Nathan 9'; Natan 79' (pen.)	Report

Arena Pantanal, Cuiabá
Attendance: 155
Referee: Rodrigo Batista Raposo (Distrito Federal)

April 27, 2016
20:30 UTC−04:00

Nacional (Amazonas (Brazilian state))	1–1	(Mato Grosso) Dom Bosco
Roberto Dias 90'	Report	Natan 26' (pen.)

Arena da Amazônia, Manaus
Attendance: 1,597
Referee: Thiago Duarte Peixoto (São Paulo)

Dom Bosco won 3–1 on aggregate.

=== Match 23 ===
April 6, 2016
15:30 UTC−04:00

Princesa do Solimões (Amazonas (Brazilian state))	1–2	(Santa Catarina (state)) Chapecoense
Parintins 6'	Report	Rafael Lima 45+3'; Josimar 88'

Estádio Olímpico Gilberto Mestrinho, Manacapuru
Attendance: 2,516
Referee: Avelar Rodrigo da Silva (Ceará)

April 14, 2016
21:30 UTC−03:00

Chapecoense (Santa Catarina (state))	2–0	(Amazonas (Brazilian state)) Princesa do Solimões
Kempes 51'; Rodrigo Andrade 90+4' (pen.)	Report

Arena Condá, Chapecó
Attendance: 3,823
Referee: Diego Almeida Real (Rio Grande do Sul)

Chapecoense won 4–1 on aggregate.

=== Match 24 ===
April 6, 2016
20:30 UTC−03:00

Estanciano (Sergipe)	1–1	(Paraná (state)) Paraná
Gabriel Santana 19'	Report	Zé Roberto 90+3'

Estádio Governador Augusto Franco, Estância
Attendance: 263
Referee: Devarly Lira do Rosário (Espírito Santo)

April 21, 2016
19:15 UTC−03:00

Paraná (Paraná (state))	2–0	(Sergipe) Estanciano
Válber 16'; Jean 90'	Report

Estádio Vila Capanema, Curitiba
Attendance: 4,286
Referee: José Claudio Rocha Filho (São Paulo)

Paraná won 3–1 on aggregate.

=== Match 25 ===
March 16, 2016
21:45 UTC−03:00

Confiança (Sergipe)	1–0	(Rio de Janeiro (state)) Flamengo
Everton 79'	Report

Estádio Lourival Baptista, Aracaju
Attendance: 13,062
Referee: Emerson Luiz Sobral (Pernambuco)

April 20, 2016
21:45 UTC−03:00

Flamengo (Rio de Janeiro (state))	3–0	(Sergipe) Confiança
Mancuello 27'; Marcelo Cirino 55', 65'	Report

Estádio Raulino de Oliveira, Volta Redonda
Attendance: 5,053
Referee: Vinicius Gonçalves Dias Araujo (São Paulo)

Flamengo won 3–1 on aggregate.

=== Match 26 ===
March 16, 2016
21:45 UTC−03:00

Imperatriz (Maranhão)	1–1	(Ceará) Fortaleza
Edimar 48' (o.g.)	Report	Everton 69'

Estádio Frei Epifânio D'Abadia, Imperatriz
Attendance: 1,838
Referee: Alisson Sidnei Furtado (Tocantins)

April 28, 2016
20:00 UTC−03:00

Fortaleza (Ceará)	2–0	(Maranhão) Imperatriz
Pio 29'; Jean Mota 63'	Report

Castelão, Fortaleza
Attendance: 6,299
Referee: Gilberto Rodrigues Castro Junior (Pernambuco)

Fortaleza won 3–1 on aggregate.

=== Match 27 ===
March 16, 2016
21:45 UTC−03:00

Globo (Rio Grande do Norte)	0–0	Bahia
	Report

Estádio Manoel Dantas Barretto, Ceará-Mirim
Attendance: 1,424
Referee: Luiz César de Oliveira Magalhães (Ceará)

April 6, 2016
21:45 UTC−03:00

Bahia	3–1	(Rio Grande do Norte) Globo
Eder 1'; Zé Roberto 28'; Edigar Junio 78'	Report	Rivaldo 27'

Itaipava Arena Fonte Nova, Salvador
Attendance: 3,749
Referee: Rodolpho Toski Marques (Paraná)

Bahia won 3–1 on aggregate.

=== Match 28 ===
April 6, 2016
21:45 UTC−03:00

Red Bull Brasil (São Paulo (state))	1–1	(Minas Gerais) América Mineiro
Edmílson 42' (pen.)	Report	Bryan 26'

Estádio Moisés Lucarelli, Campinas
Attendance: 464
Referee: Bruno Arleu de Araujo (Rio de Janeiro)

April 6, 2016
21:45 UTC−03:00

América Mineiro (Minas Gerais)	3–2	(São Paulo (state)) Red Bull Brasil
Alison 2'; Borges 49'; Osman Júnior 65'	Report	Edmílson 52'; Willian Magrão 82'

Estádio Independência, Belo Horizonte
Attendance: 1,257
Referee: Alisson Sidnei Furtado (Tocantins)

América Mineiro won 4–3 on aggregate.

=== Match 29 ===
April 6, 2016
21:45 UTC−03:00

Tombense (Minas Gerais)	0–3	(Rio de Janeiro (state)) Fluminense
	Report	Gerson 29'; Marcos Júnior 39', 76'

Estádio Soares de Azevedo, Muriaé
Attendance: 6,740
Referee: Felipe Duarte Varejão (Espírito Santo)

Fluminense advanced directly due to winning by 2 or more goals difference.

=== Match 30 ===
March 17, 2016
19:15 UTC−03:00

Ferroviária (São Paulo (state))	1–0	(Pernambuco) Salgueiro
Tiago Marques 80'	Report

Estádio Dr. Adhemar Pereira de Barros, Araraquara
Attendance: 1,961
Referee: Bruno Rezende Silva (Goiás)

April 13, 2016
20:30 UTC−03:00

Salgueiro (Pernambuco)	1–1	(São Paulo (state)) Ferroviária
Cássio Emmanuel 64'	Report	Fernando Gabriel 14'

Estádio Cornélio de Barros, Salgueiro
Attendance: 3,331
Referee: Francisco de Paula dos Santos Silva Neto (Rio Grande do Sul)

Ferroviária won 2–1 on aggregate.

=== Match 31 ===
April 6, 2016
19:30 UTC−03:00

Aparecidense (Goiás)	2–0	(Pernambuco) Sport Recife
Robert 61'; Filipe 89'	Report

Estádio Annibal Batista de Toledo, Aparecida de Goiânia
Attendance: 636
Referee: Emerson de Almeida Ferreira (Minas Gerais)

April 28, 2016
19:15 UTC−03:00

Sport Recife (Pernambuco)	1–2	(Goiás) Aparecidense
Diego Souza 36'	Report	Mateus Magro 20'; Clayton Sales 66'

Estádio Ilha do Retiro, Recife
Attendance: 1,176
Referee: Pablo Ramon Gonçalves Pinheiro (Rio Grande do Norte)

Aparecidense won 4–1 on aggregate.

=== Match 32 ===
March 17, 2016
19:15 UTC−03:00

Ypiranga (Rio Grande do Sul)	2–2	(Goiás) Atlético Goianiense
Léo 23'; Túlio Renan 51'	Report	Luiz Fernando 5'; Júnior Viçosa 39'

Estádio Olímpico Colosso da Lagoa, Erechim
Attendance: 972
Referee: Rodrigo Batista Raposo (Distrito Federal)

April 7, 2016
19:30 UTC−03:00

Atlético Goianiense (Goiás)	0–2	(Rio Grande do Sul) Ypiranga
	Report	João Paulo 48' (pen.), 76'

Estádio Serra Dourada, Goiânia
Attendance: 1,298
Referee: Charles Hebert Cavalcante Ferreira (Alagoas)

Ypiranga won 4–2 on aggregate.

=== Match 33 ===
March 14, 2016
21:30 UTC−03:00

Lajeadense (Rio Grande do Sul)	0–2	(Santa Catarina (state)) Figueirense
	Report	Rafael Moura 8'; Dudu 45'

Estádio Beira-Rio, Porto Alegre
Attendance: 346
Referee: Adriano Milczvski (Paraná)

Figueirense advanced directly due to winning by 2 or more goals difference.

=== Match 34 ===
April 6, 2016
19:30 UTC−03:00

Internacional de Lages (Santa Catarina (state))	1–2	(Maranhão) Sampaio Corrêa
Romarinho 86'	Report	Guilherme Santos 54'; Daniel Barros 73'

Estádio Vidal Ramos Júnior, Lages
Attendance: 2,860
Referee: Rafael Traci (Paraná)

April 20, 2016
19:30 UTC−03:00

Sampaio Corrêa (Maranhão)	0–1	(Santa Catarina (state)) Internacional de Lages
	Report	André Gava 54'

Castelão, São Luís
Attendance: 3,374
Referee: Luiz César de Oliveira Magalhães (Ceará)

Tied 2–2 on aggregate, Sampaio Corrêa won on away goals.

=== Match 35 ===
April 7, 2016
21:30 UTC−03:00

Caldense (Minas Gerais)	1–2	(São Paulo (state)) Ponte Preta
Ewerton Maradona 15'	Report	Cristian 45+2'; Douglas Grolli 90+2'

Estádio Dr. Ronaldo Junqueira, Poços de Caldas
Attendance: 1,737
Referee: Pathrice Wallace Corrêa Maia (Rio de Janeiro)

April 14, 2016
21:30 UTC−03:00

Ponte Preta (São Paulo (state))	1–1	(Minas Gerais) Caldense
Douglas Grolli 90'	Report	Tiago Azulão 87'

Estádio Moisés Lucarelli, Campinas
Attendance: 2,012
Referee: Alexandre Vargas Tavares de Jesus (Rio de Janeiro)

Ponte Preta won 3–2 on aggregate.

=== Match 36 ===
April 6, 2016
20:30 UTC−04:00

Genus (Rondônia)	2–0	(Alagoas) ASA
Tcharlles 9', 33'	Report

Estádio Aluízio Ferreira, Porto Velho
Attendance: 1,858
Referee: Wales Martins de Souza (Distrito Federal)

April 28, 2016
21:30 UTC−03:00

ASA (Alagoas)	2–1	(Rondônia) Genus
Klenisson Silva 45'; Junior 90'	Report	Tcharlles 1'

Estádio Municipal Coaracy da Mata Fonseca, Arapiraca
Attendance: 879
Referee: Claudionor dos Santos Junior (Sergipe)

Gênus won 3–2 on aggregate.

=== Match 37 ===
April 5, 2016
21:30 UTC−03:00

Coruripe (Alagoas)	0–1	(Rio de Janeiro (state)) Botafogo
	Report	Luís Henrique 83'

Estádio Gerson Amaral, Coruripe
Attendance: 1,327
Referee: Gilberto Rodrigues Castro Júnior (Pernambuco)

April 28, 2016
21:30 UTC−03:00

Botafogo (Rio de Janeiro (state))	1–1	(Alagoas) Coruripe
Sassá 66' (pen.)	Report	João Paulo 29' (pen.)

Estádio de Los Larios, Duque de Caxias
Attendance: 261
Referee: Wanderson Alves de Sousa (Minas Gerais)

Botafogo won 2–1 on aggregate.

=== Match 38 ===
April 6, 2016
20:30 UTC−03:00

Juazeirense (Bahia)	1–0	(Mato Grosso) Cuiabá
Ricardo Braz 19'	Report

Estádio Adauto Moraes, Juazeiro
Attendance: 1,741
Referee: Bruno Arleu de Araújo (Rio de Janeiro)

April 27, 2016
20:30 UTC−04:00

Cuiabá (Mato Grosso)	1–0	(Bahia) Juazeirense
Uederson 25'	Report
Penalties
João Carlos (penalty scored); Edvânio (penalty scored); Júlio Alves (penalty scored); Joílson (penalty missed); Leo Salino (penalty scored)	4–5	Nino Guerreiro (penalty scored); Nen (penalty scored); Deca (penalty scored); Ebinho (penalty scored); Wanderson (penalty scored)

Arena Pantanal, Cuiabá
Attendance: 148
Referee: Roberto Giovanny Oliveira Silva (Goiás)

Tied 1–1 on aggregate, Juazeirense won on penalties.

=== Match 39 ===
April 21, 2016
18:15 UTC−04:00

CEOV (Mato Grosso)	1–0	(Santa Catarina (state)) Avaí
Thiago Rômulo 42'	Report

Arena Pantanal, Cuiabá
Attendance: 437
Referee: Nielson Nogueira Dias (Pernambuco)

April 28, 2016
19:15 UTC−03:00

Avaí (Santa Catarina (state))	2–0	(Mato Grosso) CEOV
William 25' (pen.), 56'	Report

Estádio da Ressacada, Florianópolis
Attendance: 2,669
Referee: Diego Almeida Real (Rio Grande do Sul)

Avaí won 2–1 on aggregate.

=== Match 40 ===
April 19, 2016
19:30 UTC−03:00

Brasília (Federal District (Brazil))	0–2	(São Paulo (state)) Bragantino
	Report	Alemão 54' (pen.); Erick 78'

Bezerrão, Gama
Attendance: 94
Referee: Paulo Henrique de Melo Salmazio (Mato Grosso do Sul)

Bragantino advanced directly due to winning by 2 or more goals difference.
