= 2016 Copa do Brasil Second Round =

The 2016 Copa do Brasil Second Round will be played from 3 May to 6 July 2016, to decide the 20 teams advancing to the Third Round.

== Matches ==
Team 1	Agg.	Team 2	1st leg	2nd leg
Santos (São Paulo (state))	3–0	(Acre (state)) Galvez	3–0	–
ABC (Rio Grande do Norte)	2–2 (1–4 p)	(Federal District (Brazil)) Gama	1–1	1–1
Botafogo (Paraíba)	2–0	(Piauí) Ríver	1–0	1–0
Ceará	2–0	(Santa Catarina (state)) Joinville	1–0	1–0
Vasco da Gama (Rio de Janeiro (state))	2–1	(Alagoas) CRB	1–0	1–1
Santa Cruz (Pernambuco)	2–0	(Bahia) Vitória da Conquista	2–0	–
Cruzeiro (Minas Gerais)	2–0	(Paraná (state)) Londrina	2–0	–
Vitória (Bahia)	3–1	(São Paulo (state)) Portuguesa	0–0	3–1
Coritiba (Paraná (state))	2–3	(Rio Grande do Sul) Juventude	0–1	2–2
Paysandu (Pará)	2–1	(Paraná (state)) Operário	0–1	2–0
Atlético Paranaense (Paraná (state))	7–2	(Mato Grosso) Dom Bosco	2–2	5–0
Chapecoense (Santa Catarina (state))	3–2	(Paraná (state)) Paraná	1–2	2–0
Flamengo (Rio de Janeiro (state))	2–4	(Ceará) Fortaleza	1–2	1–2
Bahia	0–1	(Minas Gerais) América Mineiro	0–0	0–1
Fluminense (Rio de Janeiro (state))	6–3	(São Paulo (state)) Ferroviária	3–3	3–0
Aparecidense (Goiás)	3–4	(Rio Grande do Sul) Ypiranga	1–3	2–1
Figueirense (Santa Catarina (state))	3–1	(Maranhão) Sampaio Corrêa	2–1	1–0
Ponte Preta (São Paulo (state))	4–0	(Rondônia) Genus	1–0	3–0
Botafogo (Rio de Janeiro (state))	3–1	(Bahia) Juazeirense	2–1	1–0
Avaí (Santa Catarina (state))	1–2	(São Paulo (state)) Bragantino	0–1	1–1

=== Match 41 ===
May 11, 2016
17:30 UTC−05:00

Galvez (Acre (state))	0–3	(São Paulo (state)) Santos
	Report	Rafael Longuine 35'; Paulinho 45'; Fernando Medeiros 59'

Arena da Floresta, Rio Branco
Attendance: 1,572
Referee: Rodrigo Nunes de Sá

Santos advanced directly due to winning by 2 or more goals difference.

=== Match 42 ===
June 1, 2016
19:30 UTC−03:00

Gama (Federal District (Brazil))	1–1	(Rio Grande do Norte) ABC
Roberto Pítio 68' (pen.)	Report	Nando 32'

Bezerrão, Gama
Attendance: 2,338
Referee: Emerson de Almeida Ferreira (Minas Gerais)

June 15, 2016
20:30 UTC−03:00

ABC (Rio Grande do Norte)	1–1	(Federal District (Brazil)) Gama
Erivélton 12'	Report	Felipe Assis 66'
Penalties
Jones Carioca (penalty scored); Felipe Guedes (penalty missed); Victor Sapo (penalty missed)	1–4	Murilo (penalty scored); Roberto Pítio (penalty scored); Baiano (penalty scored); Fábio Gama (penalty scored)

Frasqueirão, Natal
Attendance: 2,525
Referee: Rafael Traci (Paraná)

Tied 2–2 on aggregate, Gama won on penalties.

=== Match 43 ===
May 11, 2016
20:30 UTC−03:00

Ríver (Piauí)	0–1	(Paraíba) Botafogo
	Report	Jerffeson Recife 72'

Albertão, Teresina
Attendance: 6,315
Referee: Mayron Frederico dos Reis Novais (Maranhão)

May 18, 2016
20:30 UTC−03:00

Botafogo (Paraíba)	1–0	(Piauí) Ríver
Carlinhos 52'	Report

Almeidão, João Pessoa
Attendance: 15,220
Referee: José Reinaldo Figueiredo da Silva Filho (Alagoas)

Botafogo won 2–0 on aggregate

=== Match 44 ===
May 11, 2016
19:30 UTC−03:00

Joinville (Santa Catarina (state))	0–1	Ceará
	Report	Rafael Costa 11'

Arena Joinville, Joinville
Attendance: 5,050
Referee: Wagner Reway (Mato Grosso)

May 17, 2016
19:15 UTC−03:00

Ceará	1–0	(Santa Catarina (state)) Joinville
Tomas Bastos 51'	Report

Castelão, Fortaleza
Attendance: 6,176
Referee: Edmar Campos Encarnação (Amazonas)

Ceará won 2–0 on aggregate.

=== Match 45 ===
May 11, 2016
21:45 UTC−03:00

CRB (Alagoas)	0–1	(Rio de Janeiro (state)) Vasco da Gama
	Report	Rodrigo 42'

Estádio Rei Pelé, Maceió
Attendance: 9,441
Referee: Cleisson Veloso Pereira (Minas Gerais)

May 18, 2016
19:30 UTC−03:00

Vasco da Gama (Rio de Janeiro (state))	1–1	(Alagoas) CRB
Rafael Vaz 90+2'	Report	Diego 29'

Estádio São Januário, Rio de Janeiro
Attendance: 2,614
Referee: Francisco de Paula dos Santos Silva Neto (Rio Grande do Sul)

Vasco da Gama won 2–1 on aggregate.

=== Match 46 ===
May 11, 2016
21:45 UTC−03:00

Vitória da Conquista (Bahia)	0–2	(Pernambuco) Santa Cruz
	Report	Bruno Moraes 62', 86'

Estádio Municipal Lomanto Júnior, Vitória da Conquista
Attendance: 2,944
Referee: Eduardo de Santana Nunes (Sergipe)

Santa Cruz advanced directly due to winning by 2 or more goals difference.

=== Match 47 ===
May 10, 2016
21:30 UTC−03:00

Londrina (Paraná (state))	0–2	(Minas Gerais) Cruzeiro
	Report	Bruno Rodrigo 22'; Henrique 37'

Estádio do Café, Londrina
Attendance: 3,393
Referee: Marcio Henrique de Gois (São Paulo)

Cruzeiro advanced directly due to winning by 2 or more goals difference.

=== Match 48 ===
May 11, 2016
21:45 UTC−03:00

Portuguesa (São Paulo (state))	0–0	(Bahia) Vitória
	Report

Estádio do Canindé, São Paulo
Attendance: 1,130
Referee: Devarly Lira do Rosario (Espírito Santo)

May 19, 2016
21:30 UTC−03:00

Vitória (Bahia)	3–1	(São Paulo (state)) Portuguesa
Diego Renan 41' (pen.); Marcelo 49'; Kieza 82'	Report	Diego Gonçalves 19'

Estádio Manoel Barradas, Salvador
Attendance: 5,251
Referee: Rodrigo Batista Raposo (Distrito Federal)

Vitória won 3–1 on aggregate.

=== Match 49 ===
May 11, 2016
19:30 UTC−03:00

Juventude (Rio Grande do Sul)	1–0	(Paraná (state)) Coritiba
Wallacer 13'	Report

Estádio Alfredo Jaconi, Caxias do Sul
Attendance: 1,501
Referee: Thiago Duarte Peixoto (São Paulo)

May 19, 2016
19:15 UTC−03:00

Coritiba (Paraná (state))	2–2	(Rio Grande do Sul) Juventude
Kléber 9' (pen.); Alan Santos 90'	Report	Roberson 75'; Sananduva 90+4'

Estádio Couto Pereira, Curitiba
Attendance: 6,426
Referee: Leandro Bizzio Marinho (São Paulo)

Juventude won 3–2 on aggregate.

=== Match 50 ===
May 17, 2016
19:15 UTC−03:00

Operário (Paraná (state))	1–0	(Pará) Paysandu
Washington 60'	Report

Estádio Germano Krüger, Ponta Grossa
Attendance: 3,120
Referee: Braulio da Silva Machado (Santa Catarina)

July 6, 2016
19:30 UTC−03:00

Paysandu (Pará)	2–0	(Paraná (state)) Operário
Gilvan 38', 44'	Report

Estádio da Curuzú, Belém
Attendance: 7,762
Referee: José Ricardo Vasconcellos Laranjeira (Alagoas)

Paysandu won 2–1 on aggregate.

=== Match 51 ===
May 11, 2016
20:30 UTC−04:00

Dom Bosco (Mato Grosso)	2–2	(Paraná (state)) Atlético Paranaense
Naian 85'; Fernando Nathan 86'	Report	Vinícius 30'; André Lima 77'

Arena Pantanal, Cuiabá
Attendance: 3,025
Referee: Eduardo Tomaz de Aquino Valadão (Goiás)

May 18, 2016
19:30 UTC−03:00

Atlético Paranaense (Paraná (state))	5–0	(Mato Grosso) Dom Bosco
André Lima 12', 35'; Pablo 31'; Hernani 59'; Anderson Lopes 76' (pen.)	Report

Arena da Baixada, Curitiba
Attendance: 8,213
Referee: Wanderson Alves de Sousa (Minas Gerais)

Atlético Paranaense won 7–2 on aggregate.

=== Match 52 ===
May 11, 2016
19:30 UTC−03:00

Paraná (Paraná (state))	2–1	(Santa Catarina (state)) Chapecoense
Nádson 41', 69' (pen.)	Report	Bruno Rangel 19'

Estádio Vila Capanema, Curitiba
Attendance: 3,955
Referee: Vinicius Furlan (São Paulo)

May 18, 2016
19:30 UTC−03:00

Chapecoense (Santa Catarina (state))	2–0	(Paraná (state)) Paraná
Kempes 2'; Cléber Santana 80'	Report

Arena Condá, Chapecó
Attendance: 4,472
Referee: Alexandre Vargas Tavares de Jesus (Rio de Janeiro)

Chapecoense won 3–2 on aggregate.

=== Match 53 ===
May 4, 2016
21:45 UTC−03:00

Fortaleza (Ceará)	2–1	(Rio de Janeiro (state)) Flamengo
Anselmo 20'; Felipe 72'	Report	Guerrero 65'

Castelão, Fortaleza
Attendance: 36,213
Referee: Marielson Alves Silva (Bahia)

May 18, 2016
21:45 UTC−03:00

Flamengo (Rio de Janeiro (state))	1–2	(Ceará) Fortaleza
Alan Patrick 88'	Report	Pio 3', 64'

Estádio Raulino de Oliveira, Volta Redonda
Attendance: 5,193
Referee: Diego Almeida Real (Rio Grande do Sul)

Fortaleza won 4–2 on aggregate.

=== Match 54 ===
May 11, 2016
21:45 UTC−03:00

América Mineiro (Minas Gerais)	0–0	Bahia
	Report

Estádio Independência, Belo Horizonte
Attendance: 1,288
Referee: Bruno Arleu de Araujo (Rio de Janeiro)

May 18, 2016
21:45 UTC−03:00

Bahia	0–1	(Minas Gerais) América Mineiro
	Report	Suéliton 51'

Itaipava Arena Fonte Nova, Salvador
Attendance: 5,849
Referee: Vinícius Gonçalves Dias Araújo (São Paulo)

América Mineiro won 1–0 on aggregate.

=== Match 55 ===
May 4, 2016
19:30 UTC−03:00

Ferroviária (São Paulo (state))	3–3	(Rio de Janeiro (state)) Fluminense
Luan 43'; Tiago Marques 45+2', 50'	Report	Fred 16' (pen.), 29'; Magno Alves 74'

Estádio Fonte Luminosa, Araraquara
Attendance: 4,610
Referee: Diego Almeida Real (Rio Grande do Sul)

May 12, 2016
21:30 UTC−03:00

Fluminense (Rio de Janeiro (state))	3–0	(São Paulo (state)) Ferroviária
Gustavo Scarpa 7', 32'; Fred 35'	Report

Estádio Raulino de Oliveira, Volta Redonda
Attendance: 602
Referee: Emerson de Almeida Ferreira (Minas Gerais)

Fluminense won 6–3 on aggregate.

=== Match 56 ===
May 11, 2016
20:30 UTC−03:00

Ypiranga (Rio Grande do Sul)	3–1	(Goiás) Aparecidense
João Paulo 42' (pen.), 49'; Danilinho 74' (pen.)	Report	Clayton Sales 3'

Estádio Olímpico Colosso da Lagoa, Erechim
Attendance: 1,028
Referee: Vinicius Gonçalves Dias Araujo (São Paulo)

May 19, 2016
21:30 UTC−03:00

Aparecidense (Goiás)	2–1	(Rio Grande do Sul) Ypiranga
Foguinho 24'; Geovane 48'	Report	Maycon 59'

Estádio Annibal Batista de Toledo, Aparecida de Goiânia
Attendance: 1,761
Referee: Felipe Duarte Varejão (Espírito Santo)

Ypiranga won 4–3 on aggregate.

=== Match 57 ===
May 11, 2016
19:30 UTC−03:00

Sampaio Corrêa (Maranhão)	1–2	(Santa Catarina (state)) Figueirense
Edgar 78'	Report	Gustavo Ermel 52'; Guilherme Queiróz 89'

Castelão, São Luís
Attendance: 2,780
Referee: Antonio Carlos Pequeno Frutuoso (Amazonas)

July 6, 2016
19:30 UTC−03:00

Figueirense (Santa Catarina (state))	1–0	(Maranhão) Sampaio Corrêa
Éverton Santos 45'	Report

Estádio Orlando Scarpelli, Florianópolis
Attendance: 3,180
Referee: Alexandre Vargas Tavares de Jesus (Rio de Janeiro)

Figueirense won 3–1 on aggregate.

=== Match 58 ===
May 5, 2016
20:30 UTC−04:00

Genus (Rondônia)	0–1	(São Paulo (state)) Ponte Preta
	Report	Felipe Azevedo 75'

Estádio Aluízio Ferreira, Porto Velho
Attendance: 3,650
Referee: Rodrigo Batista Raposo (Distrito Federal)

May 12, 2016
21:30 UTC−03:00

Ponte Preta (São Paulo (state))	3–0	(Rondônia) Genus
Matheus Jesus 33'; Léo Cereja 69'; Wellington Paulista 76' (pen.)	Report

Estádio Moisés Lucarelli, Campinas
Attendance: 2,215
Referee: Rodrigo Carvalhaes de Miranda (Rio de Janeiro)

Ponte Preta won 4–0 on aggregate.

=== Match 59 ===
May 12, 2016
19:15 UTC−03:00

Juazeirense (Bahia)	1–2	(Rio de Janeiro (state)) Botafogo
Alex Travassos 68'	Report	Neílton 10'; Emerson 49'

Estádio Municipal Adauto Moraes, Juazeiro
Attendance: 2,517
Referee: Claudio Francisco Lima e Silva (Sergipe)

May 19, 2016
21:30 UTC−03:00

Botafogo (Rio de Janeiro (state))	1–0	(Bahia) Juazeirense
Neílton 85'	Report

Estádio De Los Larios, Duque de Caxias
Attendance: 377
Referee: Rodolpho Toski Marques (Paraná)

Botafogo won 3–1 on aggregate.

=== Match 60 ===
May 3, 2016
21:30 UTC−03:00

Bragantino (São Paulo (state))	1–0	(Santa Catarina (state)) Avaí
Leandro Oliveira 47'	Report

Estádio Nabi Abi Chedid, Bragança Paulista
Attendance: 4,517
Referee: Rodolpho Toski Marques (Paraná)

May 10, 2016
21:30 UTC−03:00

Avaí (Santa Catarina (state))	1–1	(São Paulo (state)) Bragantino
Tauã 60'	Report	Zambi 52'

Estádio da Ressacada, Florianópolis
Attendance: 5,343
Referee: Leonardo Garcia Cavaleiro (Rio de Janeiro)

Bragantino won 2–1 on aggregate.
