= 2016 Copa do Brasil Third Round =

The 2016 Copa do Brasil Third Round was played from 6 July to 28 July 2016 deciding the 10 teams that advanced to the knockout rounds. Different than the first two rounds, in this round the away team that wins the first match by 2 or more goals do not progress straight to the next round avoiding the second leg. The order of the matches was determined by a random draw.

== Matches ==
Team 1	Agg.	Team 2	1st leg	2nd leg
Santos (São Paulo (state))	3–0	(Federal District (Brazil)) Gama	0–0	3–0
Ceará	0–3	(Paraíba) Botafogo	0–3	0–0
Santa Cruz (Pernambuco)	3–4	(Rio de Janeiro (state)) Vasco da Gama	1–1	2–3
Cruzeiro (Minas Gerais)	4–2	(Bahia) Vitória	2–1	2–1
Paysandu (Pará)	1–2	(Rio Grande do Sul) Juventude	0–0	1–2
Chapecoense (Santa Catarina (state))	1–1 (a)	(Paraná (state)) Atlético Paranaense	0–0	1–1
Fortaleza (Ceará)	4–2	(Minas Gerais) América Mineiro	0–1	4–1
Ypiranga (Rio Grande do Sul)	1–3	(Rio de Janeiro (state)) Fluminense	1–1	0–2
Ponte Preta (São Paulo (state))	5–0	(Santa Catarina (state)) Figueirense	0–0	5–0
Botafogo (Rio de Janeiro (state))	3–2	(São Paulo (state)) Bragantino	2–2	1–0

=== Match 61 ===
July 20, 2016
21:45 UTC−03:00

Gama (Federal District (Brazil))	0–0	(São Paulo (state)) Santos
	Report

Bezerrão, Gama
Attendance: 12,066
Referee: Adriano Milczvski (Paraná)

July 27, 2016
21:45 UTC−03:00

Santos (São Paulo (state))	3–0	(Federal District (Brazil)) Gama
Ricardo Oliveira 26', 44' (pen.), 57' (pen.)	Report

Vila Belmiro, Santos
Attendance: 9,883
Referee: Diego Pombo Lopez (Bahia)

Santos won 3–0 on aggregate.

=== Match 62 ===
July 13, 2016
21:45 UTC−03:00

Botafogo (Paraíba)	3–0	Ceará
Sandro 6' (o.g.); Plínio 29', 63'	Report

Almeidão, João Pessoa
Attendance: 8,945
Referee: Salim Fende Chavez (São Paulo)

July 20, 2016
19:30 UTC−03:00

Ceará	0–0	(Paraíba) Botafogo
	Report

Estádio Presidente Vargas, Fortaleza
Attendance: 18,183
Referee: Italo Medeiros de Azevedo (Rio Grande do Norte)

Botafogo won 3–0 on aggregate

=== Match 63 ===
July 13, 2016
21:45 UTC−03:00

Vasco da Gama (Rio de Janeiro (state))	1–1	(Pernambuco) Santa Cruz
Luan 89'	Report	Bruno Moraes 2'

Estádio São Januário, Rio de Janeiro
Attendance: 6,398
Referee: Joelson Nazareno Ferreira Cardozo (Pará)

July 20, 2016
21:45 UTC−03:00

Santa Cruz (Pernambuco)	2–3	(Rio de Janeiro (state)) Vasco da Gama
Keno 69'; Arthur 90+5'	Report	Andrezinho 51'; Yago Pikachu 64'; Jorge Henrique 90+3'

Estádio do Arruda, Recife
Attendance: 14,264
Referee: Igor Junio Benevenuto (Minas Gerais)

Vasco da Gama won 4–3 on aggregate.

=== Match 64 ===
July 6, 2016
21:45 UTC−03:00

Vitória (Bahia)	1–2	(Minas Gerais) Cruzeiro
Diego Renan 15' (pen.)	Report	Willian 8', 72'

Estádio Manoel Barradas, Salvador
Attendance: 8,661
Referee: Paulo Schleich Vollkopf (Mato Grosso do Sul)

July 20, 2016
21:45 UTC−03:00

Cruzeiro (Minas Gerais)	2–1	(Bahia) Vitória
Bruno Ramires 22'; Ramón Ábila 46'	Report	Marinho 72'

Mineirão, Belo Horizonte
Attendance: 10,775
Referee: Thiago Duarte Peixoto (São Paulo)

Cruzeiro won 4–2 on aggregate.

=== Match 65 ===
July 20, 2016
19:30 UTC−03:00

Juventude (Rio Grande do Sul)	0–0	(Pará) Paysandu
	Report

Estádio Alfredo Jaconi, Caxias do Sul
Attendance: 1,625
Referee: Rafael Traci (Paraná)

July 27, 2016
19:30 UTC−03:00

Paysandu (Pará)	1–2	(Rio Grande do Sul) Juventude
Celsinho 67'	Report	Hugo Guimarães 14'; Wallacer 90'

Estádio da Curuzú, Belém
Attendance: 12,878
Referee: Gilberto Rodrigues Castro Júnior (Pernambuco)

Juventude won 2–1 on aggregate.

=== Match 66 ===
July 21, 2016
21:00 UTC−03:00

Atlético Paranaense (Paraná (state))	0–0	(Santa Catarina (state)) Chapecoense
	Report

Arena da Baixada, Curitiba
Attendance: 22,181
Referee: Grazianni Maciel Rocha (Rio de Janeiro)

July 27, 2016
19:30 UTC−03:00

Chapecoense (Santa Catarina (state))	1–1	(Paraná (state)) Atlético Paranaense
Lucas Gomes 4'	Report	Walter 55'

Arena Condá, Chapecó
Attendance: 5,297
Referee: Diego Almeida Real (Rio Grande do Sul)

Tied 1–1 on aggregate, Atlético Paranaense won on away goals.

=== Match 67 ===
July 7, 2016
21:00 UTC−03:00

América Mineiro (Minas Gerais)	1–0	(Ceará) Fortaleza
Danilo 60' (pen.)	Report

Estádio Independência, Belo Horizonte
Attendance: 1,648
Referee: Bruno Rezende Silva (Goiás)

July 28, 2016
21:00 UTC−03:00

Fortaleza (Ceará)	4–1	(Minas Gerais) América Mineiro
Lima 14'; Daniel Sobralense 25'; Anselmo 34'; Corrêa 81'	Report	Danilo 78'

Castelão, Fortaleza
Attendance: 40,203
Referee: André Luiz de Freitas Castro (Goiás)

Fortaleza won 4–2 on aggregate.

=== Match 68 ===
July 6, 2016
21:45 UTC−03:00

Fluminense (Rio de Janeiro (state))	1–1	(Rio Grande do Sul) Ypiranga
Magno Alves 56'	Report	João Paulo 25'

Estádio Raulino de Oliveira, Volta Redonda
Attendance: 492
Referee: Wanderson Alves de Sousa (Minas Gerais)

July 27, 2016
21:45 UTC−03:00

Ypiranga (Rio Grande do Sul)	0–2	(Rio de Janeiro (state)) Fluminense
	Report	Cícero 72'; Magno Alves 81'

Estádio Olímpico Colosso da Lagoa, Erechim
Attendance: 5,949
Referee: Marcelo Aparecido Ribeiro de Souza (São Paulo)

Fluminense won 3–1 on aggregate.

=== Match 69 ===
July 13, 2016
19:30 UTC−03:00

Figueirense (Santa Catarina (state))	0–0	(São Paulo (state)) Ponte Preta
	Report

Estádio Orlando Scarpelli, Florianópolis
Attendance: 4,678
Referee: Diego Almeida Real (Rio Grande do Sul)

July 27, 2016
19:30 UTC−03:00

Ponte Preta (São Paulo (state))	5–0	(Santa Catarina (state)) Figueirense
Thiago Galhardo 4', 52'; Douglas Grolli 34'; Matheus Jesus 78'; Roger 80'	Report

Estádio Moisés Lucarelli, Campinas
Attendance: 4,351
Referee: Paulo Schleich Vollkopf (Mato Grosso do Sul)

Ponte Preta won 5–0 on aggregate.

=== Match 70 ===
July 13, 2016
19:30 UTC−03:00

Bragantino (São Paulo (state))	2–2	(Rio de Janeiro (state)) Botafogo
Bruno Pacheco 20' (pen.); Eliandro 75'	Report	Dierson 38'; Gervasio Núñez 52'

Estádio Nabi Abi Chedid, Bragança Paulista
Attendance: 1,434
Referee: Rafael Martins Diniz (Distrito Federal)

July 27, 2016
19:30 UTC−03:00

Botafogo (Rio de Janeiro (state))	1–0	(São Paulo (state)) Bragantino
Vinícius Tanque 81'	Report

Arena Botafogo, Rio de Janeiro
Attendance: 4,314
Referee: Emerson de Almeida Ferreira (Minas Gerais)

Botafogo won 3–2 on aggregate.
