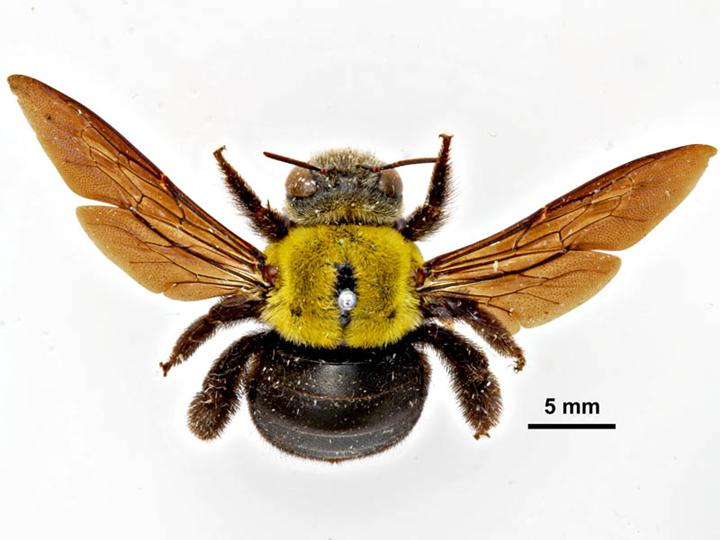
- Female

Scientific classification
- Kingdom: Animalia
- Phylum: Arthropoda
- Clade: Pancrustacea
- Class: Insecta
- Order: Hymenoptera
- Family: Apidae
- Genus: Xylocopa
- Species: X. lieftincki

Binomial name
- Xylocopa lieftincki Remko Leijs, 2000

= Xylocopa lieftincki =

Species of bee

Xylocopa lieftincki or Xylocopa (Koptortosoma) lieftincki is a species of carpenter bee. It is endemic to Australia. It was described in 2000 by Australian entomologist Remko Leijs. The species was previously overlooked because of its resemblance to Xylocopa aruana.

== Description ==
Body length is 18–24 mm; wing length 12–20 mm.

== Distribution and habitat ==
The species occurs in northern and eastern Australia. The holotype was collected on Rimbija Island in the Wessel Group of the Northern Territory. Associated habitats include open forest and shrubland, as well as agricultural land and gardens.

== Behaviour ==
The adults are flying mellivores. Flowering plants visited by the bees include Anacardium, Cassia, Crotalaria, Tristania and Wisteria species.

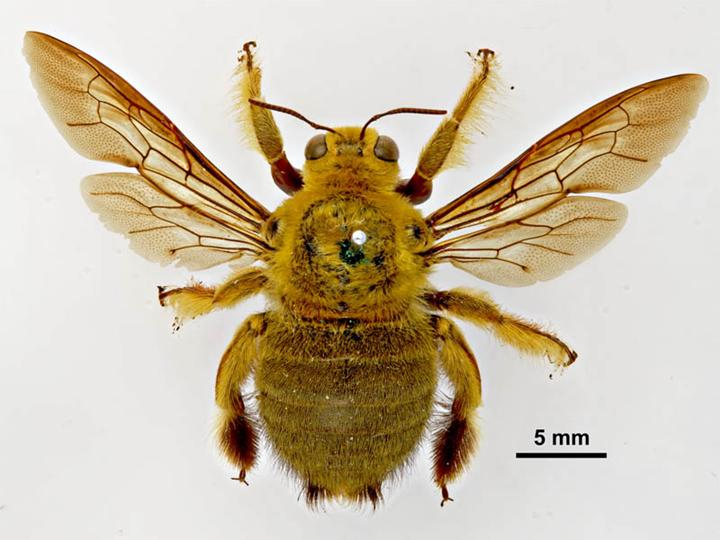
Male
