= Kesha (disambiguation) =

Kesha (Kesha Rose Sebert; born 1987) is an American singer-songwriter.

Kesha may also refer to:

== People ==
=== Given name or nickname ===
- Kesha Hendricks (born 2005), South African soccer player
- Kesha Khambhati (born 1989), Indian model and actress
- Kesha Ram (born 1986), American politician and activist
- Kesha Rogers (born 1976), American political activist
- Kesha Wizzart (died 2007), Jamaican-British singer and murder victim
- Kesha a diminutive of the Russian given name Innokentiy

=== Surname ===
- Emma Kesha (born c. 1940), Samoan-New Zealand weaver

== Fictional characters ==
- Kesha the parrot from the Soviet/Russian animated shorts series The Return of the Prodigal Parrot
- Kesha the brown bear from Russian animated series Be-Be-Bears named Bucky in the English dubbing

== Other uses ==
- Kesha Township (颗砂 乡, Kē-shā Xiāng), Yongshun County, Hunan Province, China

== See also ==
- Kesha'i language
- Keisha (disambiguation)
