= Cássio =

Cássio is a Brazilian masculine given name, and Cassio is an Italian surname.

Cássio or Cassio may refer to:

== People ==
=== Given name ===
- Cássio Alessandro de Souza (born 1986), Brazilian footballer
- Cássio Alves de Barros (born 1970), Brazilian footballer
- Cássio (footballer, born January 1980), Cássio José de Abreu Oliveira, Brazilian football left-back
- Cássio (footballer, born August 1980), Cássio Albuquerque dos Anjos, Brazilian football goalkeeper
- Cássio (footballer, born 1999), Cássio Luiz da Silva Júnior, Brazilian football midfielder
- Cássio Motta (born 1960), Brazilian tennis player
- Cássio (footballer, born 1987), Cássio Ramos, Brazilian football goalkeeper
- Cássio Vargas (born 1983), Brazilian footballer
- Cassio Werneck, Brazilian jiu-jitsu competitor and instructor

=== Surname ===
- Nicola Cassio (born 1985), Italian swimmer

=== Characters ===
- Michael Cassio, a character in William Shakespeare's tragedy Othello
- General Tagge or Cassio Tagge, character in the Star Wars universe

== Places in the United Kingdom ==
- Cassiobury, a suburb of Watford, Hertfordshire
- Cassio (or Cashio), an archaic name for the estate of Cassiobury House, a former stately home in Watford
- Cassiobury Park, a public park in Watford
- Cassiobridge tube station, a planned London Underground station in Watford

== See also ==
- Casio, a multinational electronic devices manufacturing company
- Casso, an Italian village in the municipality of Erto e Casso
- Cassia (disambiguation)
- Cassie (disambiguation)
- Anthony Casso, an American mobster
- Kassio (disambiguation)
