= Kassio =

Kassio is a given name. It may refer to:

- Kássio Nunes (born 1972), Brazilian magistrate
- Kassio (footballer, born 1987), Kassio Fernandes Magalhães, Brazilian football centre-back
- Kassio (footballer, born 1992), Kassio Fernando Rocha Martins, Brazilian football midfielder
- Kássio (footballer, born 2006), Kássio da Silva de Jesus, Brazilian football winger

== See also ==
- Cássio (disambiguation)
