= Keziah (name) =

Hebrew female given name

Keziah/Kezhia
- Pronunciation: /kɛˈzaɪə/
- Gender: Unisex (mostly female)
- Language: Hebrew

Origin
- Meaning: Cinnamon bark

Other names
- Related names: Cassia; Keshia; Keisha

Keziah or Kezia is a Hebrew name. Keziah was a daughter of Job in the Hebrew Bible (Job 42:14–17). The name Keziah means 'cinnamon bark'. Job gave the name to his second daughter after his restoration following the trials he faced in the first part of his life.

In the United Kingdom, the name Keziah is now unusual, but it was more common in Victorian times. In 1890, the births of 137 children named Kezia were registered in England; in 1990, only 40 were registered. More recently the name has become unisex despite its origin such as the musician Keziah Jones. Keziah has also found its way into modern literature in the book Keziah Dane by Sue Grafton.

Keziah was also used as a female first name in the United States in the nineteenth century. For example, Keziah Brevard ran a plantation in South Carolina in the 1850s and 60s; Keziah Brower lived on farms near Madison, Wisconsin and Vermillion, Dakota Territory (now South Dakota) in the 1850s, 60s, and 70s. H. P. Lovecraft's The Dreams in the Witch House features a character named Keziah Mason.

The modern name Keisha is derived from this name.
