= Kezia =

Kezia may refer to:

- Kezia or Keziah, a Hebrew name
- Keziah, Biblical character, daughter of Job and sister to Jemima and Kerenhappuch
- Kezia of Buganda (1906–1998), member of the Ugandan royalty
- Kezia Walker, a fictional character in the British television series The Bill
- Kezia (album), a 2005 album by Protest the Hero
- Typhoon Kezia (1950), a tropical storm
- Kezia, the name ascribed to the wife of Ham (son of Noah) by Ark Encounter

== See also ==
- Cassia (disambiguation)
