= 2016 Copa do Brasil =

Copa Continental Pneus do Brasil 2016
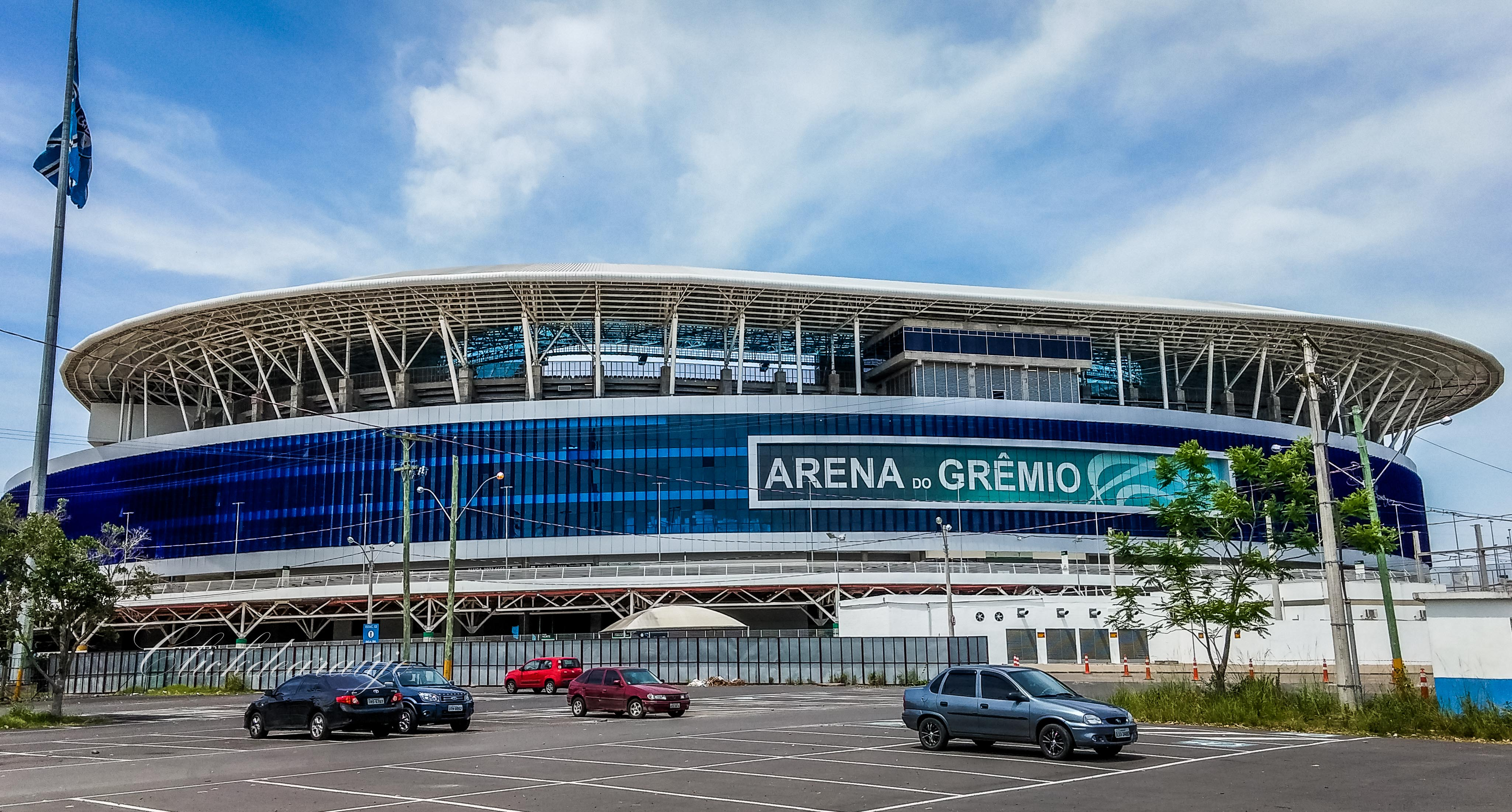

Tournament details
- Country: Brazil
- Dates: 16 March – 7 December 2016
- Teams: 86

Final positions
- Champions: (Rio Grande do Sul) Grêmio (5th title)
- Runners-up: (Minas Gerais) Atlético Mineiro

Tournament statistics
- Matches played: 151
- Goals scored: 329 (2.18 per match)
- Top goal scorer: Marinho (6 goals)

Awards
- Best player: Douglas (Grêmio)

The 2016 Copa do Brasil (officially the Copa Continental Pneus do Brasil 2016 for sponsorship reasons) was the 28th edition of the Copa do Brasil football competition. The competition was contested by 86 teams, which qualified either by their respective state championships (70), by the 2016 CBF ranking (10) or those qualified for 2015 Copa Libertadores (5) and the team with the best 2015 Série A record (excluding those qualified for 2016 Copa Libertadores). The latter six clubs entered the competition in the round of 16. The best six teams of the 2015 Campeonato Brasileiro Série A eliminated until the third round qualified for the 2016 Copa Sudamericana.

== Format ==
The competition was a single elimination knockout tournament featuring two-legged ties. In the first two rounds, if the away team won the first match by two or more goals, it progressed straight to the next round and avoided the second leg. The away goals rule was also used in the Copa do Brasil, with the exception of the finals. The winner qualified for the 2017 Copa Libertadores.

== Qualified teams ==
The teams in bold are qualified directly for the round of 16.

Association	Team (Berth)	Qualification method
(Acre (state)) Acre; 2 berths	Rio Branco	2015 Campeonato Acriano champions
(Acre (state)) Acre; 2 berths	Galvez	2015 Campeonato Acriano runners-up
(Alagoas) Alagoas; 3 berths	CRB	2015 Campeonato Alagoano champions
(Alagoas) Alagoas; 3 berths	Coruripe	2015 Campeonato Alagoano runners-up
(Alagoas) Alagoas; 3 berths	ASA	2015 Campeonato Alagoano first stage champions
(Amapá) Amapá; 1 berth	Santos	2015 Campeonato Amapaense champions
(Amazonas (Brazilian state)) Amazonas; 2 berths	Nacional	2015 Campeonato Amazonense champions
(Amazonas (Brazilian state)) Amazonas; 2 berths	Princesa do Solimões	2015 Campeonato Amazonense runners-up
(Bahia) Bahia; 3+1 berths	Bahia	2015 Campeonato Baiano champions
(Bahia) Bahia; 3+1 berths	Vitória da Conquista	2015 Campeonato Baiano runners-up
(Bahia) Bahia; 3+1 berths	Juazeirense	2015 Copa Governador do Estado da Bahia runners-up
(Bahia) Bahia; 3+1 berths	Vitória	2nd best placed team in the 2016 CBF ranking not already qualified
(Ceará) Ceará; 3 berths	Fortaleza	2015 Campeonato Cearense champions
(Ceará) Ceará; 3 berths	Ceará	2015 Campeonato Cearense runners-up
(Ceará) Ceará; 3 berths	Guarany de Sobral	2015 Copa Fares Lopes champions
(Federal District (Brazil)) Federal District; 2 berths	Gama	2015 Campeonato Brasiliense champions
(Federal District (Brazil)) Federal District; 2 berths	Brasília	2015 Campeonato Brasiliense runners-up
Espírito Santo; 1 berth	Rio Branco	2015 Campeonato Capixaba champions
(Goiás) Goiás; 3+1 berths	Goiás	2015 Campeonato Goiano champions
(Goiás) Goiás; 3+1 berths	Aparecidense	2015 Campeonato Goiano runners-up
(Goiás) Goiás; 3+1 berths	Goianésia	2015 Campeonato Goiano 3rd place
(Goiás) Goiás; 3+1 berths	Atlético Goianiense	6th best placed team in the 2016 CBF ranking not already qualified
(Maranhão) Maranhão; 2 berths	Imperatriz	2015 Campeonato Maranhense champions
(Maranhão) Maranhão; 2 berths	Sampaio Corrêa	2015 Campeonato Maranhense runners-up
(Mato Grosso) Mato Grosso; 3 berths	Cuiabá	2015 Campeonato Mato-Grossense champions
(Mato Grosso) Mato Grosso; 3 berths	CEOV	2015 Campeonato Mato-Grossense runners-up
(Mato Grosso) Mato Grosso; 3 berths	Dom Bosco	2015 Copa FMF U-21 champions
Mato Grosso do Sul 2 berths	Comercial	2015 Campeonato Sul-Mato-Grossense champions
Mato Grosso do Sul 2 berths	Ivinhema	2015 Campeonato Sul-Mato-Grossense runners-up
Minas Gerais; 4+1 berths	**Atlético Mineiro**	**2015 Campeonato Brasileiro Série A runners-up**
Minas Gerais; 4+1 berths	Caldense	2015 Campeonato Mineiro runners-up
Minas Gerais; 4+1 berths	Cruzeiro	2015 Campeonato Mineiro 3rd place
Minas Gerais; 4+1 berths	Tombense	2015 Campeonato Mineiro 4th place
Minas Gerais; 4+1 berths	América Mineiro	2015 Campeonato Mineiro 5th place
(Pará) Pará; 3+1 berths	Remo	2015 Campeonato Paraense champions
(Pará) Pará; 3+1 berths	Independente Tucuruí	2015 Campeonato Paraense runners-up
(Pará) Pará; 3+1 berths	Parauapebas	2015 Campeonato Paraense 3rd place
(Pará) Pará; 3+1 berths	Paysandu	7th best placed team in the 2016 CBF ranking not already qualified
(Paraíba) Paraíba; 2 berths	Campinense	2015 Campeonato Paraibano champions
(Paraíba) Paraíba; 2 berths	Botafogo	2015 Campeonato Paraibano runners-up
(Paraná (state)) Paraná; 3+2 berths	CEOV	2015 Campeonato Paranaense champions
(Paraná (state)) Paraná; 3+2 berths	Coritiba	2015 Campeonato Paranaense runners-up
(Paraná (state)) Paraná; 3+2 berths	Londrina	2015 Campeonato Paranaense 3rd place
(Paraná (state)) Paraná; 3+2 berths	Atlético Paranaense	Best placed team in the 2016 CBF ranking not already qualified
(Paraná (state)) Paraná; 3+2 berths	Paraná	10th best placed team in the 2016 CBF ranking not already qualified
(Pernambuco) Pernambuco; 3+1 berths	Santa Cruz	2015 Campeonato Pernambucano champions
(Pernambuco) Pernambuco; 3+1 berths	Salgueiro	2015 Campeonato Pernambucano runners-up
(Pernambuco) Pernambuco; 3+1 berths	Sport	2015 Campeonato Pernambucano 3rd place
(Pernambuco) Pernambuco; 3+1 berths	Náutico	5th best placed team in the 2016 CBF ranking not already qualified
(Piauí) Piauí; 2 berths	Ríver	2015 Campeonato Piauiense champions
(Piauí) Piauí; 2 berths	Parnahyba	2015 Copa Piauí champions
(Rio de Janeiro (state)) Rio de Janeiro; 5 berths	Vasco da Gama	2015 Campeonato Carioca champions
(Rio de Janeiro (state)) Rio de Janeiro; 5 berths	Botafogo	2015 Campeonato Carioca runners-up
(Rio de Janeiro (state)) Rio de Janeiro; 5 berths	Flamengo	2015 Campeonato Carioca 3rd place
(Rio de Janeiro (state)) Rio de Janeiro; 5 berths	Fluminense	2015 Campeonato Carioca 4th place
(Rio de Janeiro (state)) Rio de Janeiro; 5 berths	Resende	2015 Copa Rio champions
(Rio Grande do Norte) Rio Grande do Norte; 3 berths	América de Natal	2015 Campeonato Potiguar champions
(Rio Grande do Norte) Rio Grande do Norte; 3 berths	ABC	2015 Campeonato Potiguar runners-up
(Rio Grande do Norte) Rio Grande do Norte; 3 berths	Globo	2015 Campeonato Potiguar 3rd place
(Rio Grande do Sul) Rio Grande do Sul; 4+2 berths
(Rio Grande do Sul) Rio Grande do Sul; 4+2 berths	**Grêmio**	**2015 Campeonato Brasileiro Série A 3rd place**
(Rio Grande do Sul) Rio Grande do Sul; 4+2 berths	**Internacional**	**2015 Campeonato Brasileiro Série A 5th place**
(Rio Grande do Sul) Rio Grande do Sul; 4+2 berths	Brasil de Pelotas	2015 Campeonato Gaúcho 3rd place
(Rio Grande do Sul) Rio Grande do Sul; 4+2 berths	Juventude	2015 Campeonato Gaúcho 4th place
(Rio Grande do Sul) Rio Grande do Sul; 4+2 berths	Ypiranga	2015 Campeonato Gaúcho 5th place
(Rio Grande do Sul) Rio Grande do Sul; 4+2 berths	Lajeadense	2015 Copa FGF champions
(Rondônia) Rondônia; 1 berth	Genus	2015 Campeonato Rondoniense champions
(Roraima) Roraima; 1 berth	Náutico	2015 Campeonato Roraimense champions
(Santa Catarina (state)) Santa Catarina; 4+2 berths	Figueirense	2015 Campeonato Catarinense champions
(Santa Catarina (state)) Santa Catarina; 4+2 berths	Joinville	2015 Campeonato Catarinense runners-up
(Santa Catarina (state)) Santa Catarina; 4+2 berths	Chapecoense	2015 Campeonato Catarinense 3rd place
(Santa Catarina (state)) Santa Catarina; 4+2 berths	Internacional de Lages	2015 Campeonato Catarinense 4th place
(Santa Catarina (state)) Santa Catarina; 4+2 berths	Criciúma	3rd best placed team in the 2016 CBF ranking not already qualified
(Santa Catarina (state)) Santa Catarina; 4+2 berths	Avaí	4th best placed team in the 2016 CBF ranking not already qualified
(São Paulo (state)) São Paulo; 5+3+2 berths	**Corinthians**	**2015 Campeonato Brasileiro Série A champions**
(São Paulo (state)) São Paulo; 5+3+2 berths	**Palmeiras**	**2015 Copa do Brasil champions**
(São Paulo (state)) São Paulo; 5+3+2 berths	**São Paulo**	**2015 Campeonato Brasileiro Série A 4th place**
(São Paulo (state)) São Paulo; 5+3+2 berths	Santos	2015 Campeonato Paulista champions
(São Paulo (state)) São Paulo; 5+3+2 berths	Ponte Preta	2015 Campeonato Paulista 5th place
(São Paulo (state)) São Paulo; 5+3+2 berths	Red Bull Brasil	2015 Campeonato Paulista 6th place
(São Paulo (state)) São Paulo; 5+3+2 berths	Ferroviária	2015 Campeonato Paulista Série A2 champions
(São Paulo (state)) São Paulo; 5+3+2 berths	Linense	2015 Copa Paulista champions
(São Paulo (state)) São Paulo; 5+3+2 berths	Portuguesa	8th best placed team in the 2016 CBF ranking not already qualified
(São Paulo (state)) São Paulo; 5+3+2 berths	Bragantino	9th best placed team in the 2016 CBF ranking not already qualified
(Sergipe) Sergipe; 2 berths	Confiança	2015 Campeonato Sergipano champions
(Sergipe) Sergipe; 2 berths	Estanciano	2015 Campeonato Sergipano runners-up
(Tocantins) Tocantins; 1 berth	Tocantinópolis	2015 Campeonato Tocantinense champions

== Draw ==
A draw for the first round was held by CBF on January 11, 2016. The 80 qualified teams were divided in eight groups (A-H) with 10 teams each. That division was based on the 2016 CBF ranking and the matches were drawn from the respective pots: A vs. E; B vs. F; C vs. G; D vs. H. The lower ranked teams of each match hosted the first leg. Before the round of 16 there was another draw including the six teams that directly qualified for that round. All draws were at CBF headquarters in Rio de Janeiro.

=== Seeding ===
- 2016 CBF ranking shown in brackets.

Group A	Group B	Group C	Group D
(Minas Gerais) Cruzeiro (3); (São Paulo (state)) Santos (4); (Rio de Janeiro (state)) Flamengo (6); (Rio de Janeiro (state)) Fluminense (10); (Rio de Janeiro (state)) Vasco da Gama (11); (Paraná (state)) Atlético Paranaense (12); (Rio de Janeiro (state)) Botafogo (13); (Paraná (state)) Coritiba (14); Goiás (15); (Santa Catarina (state)) Figueirense (16)	(São Paulo (state)) Ponte Preta (17); Bahia (18); (Pernambuco) Sport Recife (19); (Bahia) Vitória (20); Ceará (21); (Santa Catarina (state)) Criciúma (22); (Santa Catarina (state)) Avaí (23); (Santa Catarina (state)) Chapecoense (24); (Pernambuco) Náutico (25); (Rio Grande do Norte) ABC (26)	(Santa Catarina (state)) Joinville (27); (Goiás) Atlético Goianiense (28); (Rio Grande do Norte) América de Natal (29); (Pará) Paysandu (30); (Minas Gerais) América Mineiro (31); (São Paulo (state)) Portuguesa (32); (São Paulo (state)) Bragantino (33); (Paraná (state)) Paraná (34); (Pernambuco) Santa Cruz (35); (Alagoas) ASA (38)	(Maranhão) Sampaio Corrêa (39); (Alagoas) CRB (40); (Ceará) Fortaleza (42); (Pernambuco) Salgueiro (47); (Mato Grosso) Cuiabá (50); (Paraíba) Botafogo (56); (Paraná (state)) Londrina (58); (Rio Grande do Sul) Juventude (59); (Amazonas (Brazilian state)) Nacional (64); (Acre (state)) Rio Branco (65)
Group E	Group F	Group G	Group H
(Rio Grande do Sul) Brasil de Pelotas (66); (Pará) Remo (69); (Sergipe) Confiança (70); (Minas Gerais) Tombense (71); (Paraíba) Campinense (72); (Amapá) Santos (76); (Alagoas) Coruripe (78); (Piauí) Ríver (79); (Ceará) Guarany (80); (Rio Grande do Sul) Lajeadense (81)	(Bahia) Vitória da Conquista (82); (Goiás) Goianésia (83); (Rio de Janeiro (state)) Resende (85); (Rio Grande do Norte) Globo (89); (Mato Grosso) CEOV (90); (Roraima) Náutico (92); (Goiás) Aparecidense (93); (Amazonas (Brazilian state)) Princesa do Solimões (94); (Minas Gerais) Caldense (95); (Paraná (state)) Operário (102)	(Federal District (Brazil)) Gama (107); (Pará) Independente Tucuruí (110); (Rio Grande do Sul) Ypiranga (114); (Federal District (Brazil)) Brasília (117); (Espírito Santo) Rio Branco (118); (Rondônia) Genus (120); (Piauí) Parnahyba (128); (Sergipe) Estanciano (132); (Mato Grosso do Sul) Comercial (133); (São Paulo (state)) Red Bull Brasil (142)	(Santa Catarina (state)) Internacional de Lages (142); (Maranhão) Imperatriz (142); (Bahia) Juazeirense (174); (Tocantins) Tocantinópolis (210); (São Paulo (state)) Ferroviária (–); (São Paulo (state)) Linense (–); (Pará) Parauapebas (–); (Mato Grosso) Dom Bosco (–); (Acre (state)) Galvez (–); (Mato Grosso do Sul) Ivinhema (–)

== First round ==
Team 1	Agg.	Team 2	1st leg	2nd leg
Santos (São Paulo (state))	4–1	(Amapá) Santos	1–1	3–0
Rio Branco (Acre (state))	1–2	(Acre (state)) Galvez	0–1	1–1
ABC (Rio Grande do Norte)	4–3	(Goiás) Goianésia	1–1	3–2
América de Natal (Rio Grande do Norte)	3–3 (a)	(Federal District (Brazil)) Gama	0–1	3–2
Goiás	3–3 (7–8 p)	(Piauí) Ríver	1–2	2–1
Botafogo (Paraíba)	2–2 (6–5 p)	(São Paulo (state)) Linense	1–1	1–1
Ceará	3–3 (a)	(Rio de Janeiro (state)) Resende	2–2	1–1
Joinville (Santa Catarina (state))	2–1	(Mato Grosso do Sul) Comercial	1–1	1–0
Vasco da Gama (Rio de Janeiro (state))	3–1	(Pará) Remo	1–0	2–1
CRB (Alagoas)	2–0	(Mato Grosso do Sul) Ivinhema	2–0	–
Náutico (Pernambuco)	1–1 (a)	(Bahia) Vitória da Conquista	0–0	1–1
Santa Cruz (Pernambuco)	1–0	(Espírito Santo) Rio Branco	1–0	0–0
Cruzeiro (Minas Gerais)	3–2	(Paraíba) Campinense	0–0	3–2
Londrina (Paraná (state))	7–0	(Pará) Parauapebas	1–0	6–0
Vitória (Bahia)	6–3	(Roraima) Náutico	3–2	3–1
Portuguesa (São Paulo (state))	2–2 (a)	(Piauí) Parnahyba	1–2	1–0
Coritiba (Paraná (state))	3–0	(Ceará) Guarany de Sobral	3–0	–
Juventude (Rio Grande do Sul)	3–1	(Tocantins) Tocantinópolis	1–1	2–0
Criciúma (Santa Catarina (state))	2–3	(Paraná (state)) Operário	1–2	1–1
Paysandu (Pará)	4–1	(Pará) Independente Tucuruí	2–1	2–0
Atlético Paranaense (Paraná (state))	2–1	(Rio Grande do Sul) Brasil de Pelotas	1–1	1–0
Nacional (Amazonas (Brazilian state))	1–3	(Mato Grosso) Dom Bosco	0–2	1–1
Chapecoense (Santa Catarina (state))	4–1	(Amazonas (Brazilian state)) Princesa do Solimões	2–1	2–0
Paraná (Paraná (state))	3–1	(Sergipe) Estanciano	1–1	2–0
Flamengo (Rio de Janeiro (state))	3–1	(Sergipe) Confiança	0–1	3–0
Fortaleza (Ceará)	3–1	(Maranhão) Imperatriz	1–1	2–0
Bahia	3–1	(Rio Grande do Norte) Globo	0–0	3–1
América Mineiro (Minas Gerais)	4–3	(São Paulo (state)) Red Bull Brasil	1–1	3–2
Fluminense (Rio de Janeiro (state))	3–0	(Minas Gerais) Tombense	3–0	–
Salgueiro (Pernambuco)	1–2	(São Paulo (state)) Ferroviária	0–1	1–1
Sport Recife (Pernambuco)	1–4	(Goiás) Aparecidense	0–2	1–2
Atlético Goianiense (Goiás)	2–4	(Rio Grande do Sul) Ypiranga	2–2	0–2
Figueirense (Santa Catarina (state))	2–0	(Rio Grande do Sul) Lajeadense	2–0	–
Sampaio Corrêa (Maranhão)	2–2 (a)	(Santa Catarina (state)) Internacional de Lages	2–1	0–1
Ponte Preta (São Paulo (state))	3–2	(Minas Gerais) Caldense	2–1	1–1
ASA (Alagoas)	2–3	(Rondônia) Genus	0–2	2–1
Botafogo (Rio de Janeiro (state))	2–1	(Alagoas) Coruripe	1–0	1–1
Cuiabá (Mato Grosso)	1–1 (4–5 p)	(Bahia) Juazeirense	0–1	1–0
Avaí (Santa Catarina (state))	2–1	(Mato Grosso) CEOV	0–1	2–0
Bragantino (São Paulo (state))	2–0	(Federal District (Brazil)) Brasília	2–0	–

== Second round ==
Team 1	Agg.	Team 2	1st leg	2nd leg
Santos (São Paulo (state))	3–0	(Acre (state)) Galvez	3–0	–
ABC (Rio Grande do Norte)	2–2 (1–4 p)	(Federal District (Brazil)) Gama	1–1	1–1
Botafogo (Paraíba)	2–0	(Piauí) Ríver	1–0	1–0
Ceará	2–0	(Santa Catarina (state)) Joinville	1–0	1–0
Vasco da Gama (Rio de Janeiro (state))	2–1	(Alagoas) CRB	1–0	1–1
Santa Cruz (Pernambuco)	2–0	(Bahia) Vitória da Conquista	2–0	–
Cruzeiro (Minas Gerais)	2–0	(Paraná (state)) Londrina	2–0	–
Vitória (Bahia)	3–1	(São Paulo (state)) Portuguesa	0–0	3–1
Coritiba (Paraná (state))	2–3	(Rio Grande do Sul) Juventude	0–1	2–2
Paysandu (Pará)	2–1	(Paraná (state)) Operário	0–1	2–0
Atlético Paranaense (Paraná (state))	7–2	(Mato Grosso) Dom Bosco	2–2	5–0
Chapecoense (Santa Catarina (state))	3–2	(Paraná (state)) Paraná	1–2	2–0
Flamengo (Rio de Janeiro (state))	2–4	(Ceará) Fortaleza	1–2	1–2
Bahia	0–1	(Minas Gerais) América Mineiro	0–0	0–1
Fluminense (Rio de Janeiro (state))	6–3	(São Paulo (state)) Ferroviária	3–3	3–0
Aparecidense (Goiás)	3–4	(Rio Grande do Sul) Ypiranga	1–3	2–1
Figueirense (Santa Catarina (state))	3–1	(Maranhão) Sampaio Corrêa	2–1	1–0
Ponte Preta (São Paulo (state))	4–0	(Rondônia) Genus	1–0	3–0
Botafogo (Rio de Janeiro (state))	3–1	(Bahia) Juazeirense	2–1	1–0
Avaí (Santa Catarina (state))	1–2	(São Paulo (state)) Bragantino	0–1	1–1

== Third round ==
Team 1	Agg.	Team 2	1st leg	2nd leg
Santos (São Paulo (state))	3–0	(Federal District (Brazil)) Gama	0–0	3–0
Ceará	0–3	(Paraíba) Botafogo	0–3	0–0
Santa Cruz (Pernambuco)	3–4	(Rio de Janeiro (state)) Vasco da Gama	1–1	2–3
Cruzeiro (Minas Gerais)	4–2	(Bahia) Vitória	2–1	2–1
Paysandu (Pará)	1–2	(Rio Grande do Sul) Juventude	0–0	1–2
Chapecoense (Santa Catarina (state))	1–1 (a)	(Paraná (state)) Atlético Paranaense	0–0	1–1
Fortaleza (Ceará)	4–2	(Minas Gerais) América Mineiro	0–1	4–1
Ypiranga (Rio Grande do Sul)	1–3	(Rio de Janeiro (state)) Fluminense	1–1	0–2
Ponte Preta (São Paulo (state))	5–0	(Santa Catarina (state)) Figueirense	0–0	5–0
Botafogo (Rio de Janeiro (state))	3–2	(São Paulo (state)) Bragantino	2–2	1–0

== Copa Sudamericana qualification ==
The best six teams eliminated before the round of 16 with the best 2015 Série A or 2015 Série B record (excluding those directly qualified for the round of 16) qualified for 2016 Copa Sudamericana.

Pos	Team	Final status	2015 season
1	Sport	Eliminated (first round)	6th (Série A)
2	Santos	Round of 16	7th (Série A)
3	Cruzeiro	Round of 16	8th (Série A)
4	Atlético Paranaense	Round of 16	10th (Série A)
5	Ponte Preta	Round of 16	11th (Série A)
6	Flamengo	Eliminated (second round)	12th (Série A)
7	Fluminense	Round of 16	13th (Série A)
8	Chapecoense	Eliminated (third round)	14th (Série A)
9	Coritiba	Eliminated (second round)	15th (Série A)
10	Figueirense	Eliminated (third round)	16th (Série A)
11	Botafogo	Round of 16	1st (Série B)
12	Santa Cruz	Eliminated (third round)	2nd (Série B)
13	Vitória	Eliminated (third round)	3rd (Série B)
14	América Mineiro	Eliminated (third round)	4th (Série B)
15	Avaí	Eliminated (second round)	17th (Série A)
16	Vasco da Gama	Round of 16	18th (Série A)
17	Goiás	Eliminated (first round)	19th (Série A)
18	Joinville	Eliminated (second round)	20th (Série A)

^{1} Santa Cruz qualified as (Brazil 7) in the 2016 Copa Sudamericana, independently of qualifying position of the other seven teams.

Key to colors on the table
Qualified as the 2016 Copa do Nordeste champion
Qualified
Not qualified

== Knockout stages ==
A draw by CBF was held to set the matches for the round of 16. The 16 qualified teams were divided in two pots (1-2). Teams from pot 1 were the six teams directly qualified to the round of 16, the five teams that competed at the 2016 Copa Libertadores and the best placed team in the 2015 Campeonato Brasileiro Série A not taking part in the 2016 Copa Libertadores, plus the two highest CBF ranked teams in 2016 qualified via the third round. Pot 2 was composed of the other teams that qualified through the third round. Each pot was divided into 4 pairs according to the CBF ranking. That division made sure that each team within a pair would not face each other before the finals as they would be placed in opposite sides of the bracket. The draw also decided the home team of the round of 16. The following stages had additional draws to determine the order of the matches as the tournament advanced. All draws will be held at CBF headquarters in Rio de Janeiro.

=== Seeding ===
- 2016 CBF ranking shown in brackets.

Pot 1	Pot 2
(São Paulo (state)) Corinthians (1); (Rio Grande do Sul) Grêmio (2); (Minas Gerais) Cruzeiro (3); (São Paulo (state)) Santos (4); (São Paulo (state)) São Paulo (5); (Minas Gerais) Atlético Mineiro (7); (São Paulo (state)) Palmeiras (8); (Rio Grande do Sul) Internacional (9)	(Rio de Janeiro (state)) Fluminense (10); (Rio de Janeiro (state)) Vasco da Gama (11); (Paraná (state)) Atlético Paranaense (12); (Rio de Janeiro (state)) Botafogo (13); (São Paulo (state)) Ponte Preta (17); (Ceará) Fortaleza (42); (Paraíba) Botafogo (56); (Rio Grande do Sul) Juventude (59)

=== Bracket ===
Round of 16
(Rio Grande do Sul) Juventude (a)	2	0	2
(São Paulo (state)) São Paulo	1	1	2
(São Paulo (state)) Ponte Preta	1	2	3
(Minas Gerais) Atlético Mineiro (a)	1	2	3
(Ceará) Fortaleza	0	1	1
(Rio Grande do Sul) Internacional	3	0	3
(Rio de Janeiro (state)) Vasco da Gama	1	2	3
(São Paulo (state)) Santos	3	2	5
(Paraíba) Botafogo	0	1	1
(São Paulo (state)) Palmeiras	3	0	3
(Rio Grande do Sul) Grêmio (pen.)	1	0	1 (4)
(Paraná (state)) Atlético Paranaense	0	1	1 (3)
(Minas Gerais) Cruzeiro	5	1	6
(Rio de Janeiro (state)) Botafogo	2	0	2
(São Paulo (state)) Corinthians	1	1	2
(Rio de Janeiro (state)) Fluminense	1	0	1

Quarterfinals
(Rio Grande do Sul) Juventude (pen.)	0	1	1 (2)
(Minas Gerais) Atlético Mineiro	1	0	1 (4)
(Rio Grande do Sul) Internacional	1	2	3
(São Paulo (state)) Santos	2	0	2
(São Paulo (state)) Palmeiras	1	1	2
(Rio Grande do Sul) Grêmio	2	1	3
(Minas Gerais) Cruzeiro	1	4	5
(São Paulo (state)) Corinthians	2	2	4

Semifinals
(Minas Gerais) Atlético Mineiro	2	2	4
(Rio Grande do Sul) Internacional	1	2	3
(Rio Grande do Sul) Grêmio	2	0	2
(Minas Gerais) Cruzeiro	0	0	0

Finals
(Minas Gerais) Atlético Mineiro	1	1	2
(Rio Grande do Sul) Grêmio	3	1	4

=== Round of 16 ===
Team 1	Agg.	Team 2	1st leg	2nd leg
Juventude (Rio Grande do Sul)	2–2 (a)	(São Paulo (state)) São Paulo	2–1	0–1
Corinthians (São Paulo (state))	2–1	(Rio de Janeiro (state)) Fluminense	1–1	1–0
Vasco da Gama (Rio de Janeiro (state))	3–5	(São Paulo (state)) Santos	1–3	2–2
Botafogo (Paraíba)	1–3	(São Paulo (state)) Palmeiras	0–3	1–0
Grêmio (Rio Grande do Sul)	1–1 (4–3 p)	(Paraná (state)) Atlético Paranaense	1–0	0–1
Fortaleza (Ceará)	1–3	(Rio Grande do Sul) Internacional	0–3	1–0
Cruzeiro (Minas Gerais)	6–2	(Rio de Janeiro (state)) Botafogo	5–2	1–0
Ponte Preta (São Paulo (state))	3–3 (a)	(Minas Gerais) Atlético Mineiro	1–1	2–2

=== Quarterfinals ===
Team 1	Agg.	Team 2	1st leg	2nd leg
Juventude (Rio Grande do Sul)	1–1 (2–4 p)	(Minas Gerais) Atletico Mineiro	0–1	1–0
Internacional (Rio Grande do Sul)	3–2	(São Paulo (state)) Santos	1–2	2–0
Palmeiras (São Paulo (state))	2–3	(Rio Grande do Sul) Grêmio	1–2	1–1
Cruzeiro (Minas Gerais)	5–4	(São Paulo (state)) Corinhians	1–2	4–2

=== Semifinals ===
Team 1	Agg.	Team 2	1st leg	2nd leg
Atletico Mineiro (Minas Gerais)	4–3	(Rio Grande do Sul) Internacional	2–1	2–2
Grêmio (Rio Grande do Sul)	2–0	(Minas Gerais) Cruzeiro	2–0	0–0

=== Finals ===
Team 1	Agg.	Team 2	1st leg	2nd leg
Grêmio (Rio Grande do Sul)	4–2	(Minas Gerais) Atletico Mineiro	3–1	1–1
