= Innokentiy =

Innokentiy (Russian: Иннокентий), also transliterated as Innokenti or Innokenty is a Russian given name, a variant of Innocent. Diminutives: Innokesha, Kesha. Notable people with the name include:

- Innocenty Winnicki, (1654–1700), Polish Orthodox and Catholic bishop
- Innokenti Gerasimov, Soviet geographer and pedologist, professor
- Innokentiy Kozhevnikov (1879–1931), Bolshevik, guerilla participant in the Russian Civil War
- Innokentiy Temofeevech (Jim) Zimin (1902 – 1974), Russia-born Australian peanut farmer
- Innokenty Annensky, Russian poet, critic, scholar, and translator
- Innokenty Fedenev
- Innokenty Khalepsky (1893–1938), Soviet general and politician
- Innokenty Omulevsky
- Innokenty Smoktunovsky
- Innokenty Smolin (1884–1973), Russian military commander and prominent figure in the White movement
- Innokenty Zharov, Russian sprinter

== See also ==
- Innocent lists, among others, a number of Russian Orthodox saints with the name Latinized as "Innocent"
