= Rafael (footballer, born 1986) =

Brazilian footballer

Personal information
- Full name: Rafael Diego de Souza
- Date of birth: 8 July 1986 (age 40)
- Place of birth: Porto Alegre, Brazil
- Height: 1.82 m (5 ft 11 1/2 in)
- Position: Centre-back

Senior career*
Years	Team	Apps	(Gls)
2005–2007	RS Futebol	0	(0)
2005–2006	→ Juventude (loan)	23	(0)
2007	→ Avaí (loan)	13	(0)
2008–2012	Avaí	51	(1)
2011	→ Lugano (loan)	2	(0)
2013–2014	Joinville	32	(1)
2014	Al-Ittihad Kalba	12	(0)
2015	Atlético Goianiense	17	(0)
2016	ABC	0	(0)
2016	Botev Plovdiv	0	(0)
- * Club domestic league appearances and goals

Rafael Diego de Souza (born 8 July 1986), commonly known as Rafael, is a Brazilian footballer who plays as a defender.

== Biography ==
Born in Porto Alegre, Rio Grande do Sul, Rafael was signed by RS Futebol in December 2004 along with his twin brother Cássio. They signed a 5-year contract. In March 2005 they were loaned to Juventude in 3-year contract. He played 23 games in 2005 and 2006 Campeonato Brasileiro Série A.

=== Avaí ===
In March 2007 Rafael joined Avaí until end of 2007 Campeonato Brasileiro Série B. In January 2008 he was signed permanently in 4-year contract. In his 3 years career with Avaí, he won 2009 and 2010 Campeonato Catarinense as well as finished as the third in 2008 Campeonato Brasileiro Série B and promoted. He played his 100 games for Avaí on 4 March 2010. The club gave him a special award to him.

In February 2011 he was signed by Swiss side Lugano. It was reported that he had been signed by Chunnam Dragons in June 2010 but the deal fell through.

=== Botev Plovdiv ===
On 16 June 2016 Rafael joined Botev Plovdiv. Due to an injury Rafael never took part in any official games.

== Personal ==
Rafael played along with his twin brother Cássio from 2005 to 2008.

== Honours ==
Avaí

- Campeonato Catarinense: 2009, 2010

Individual

- Best centre back Campeonato Catarinense: 2010
