= Cassia (name) =

Cassia may refer to:

== Given name ==
- Cassia, Kezia or Keziah, a female surname of Biblical origin
- the female gentilicium name of the Cassia gens in ancient Rome
- Cassia or Kassia, Byzantine abbess and music scholar
- Cássia Eller (1962–2001), Brazilian musician
- Cássia Kiss (born 1958), Brazilian actress
- Cassià Maria Just (1926–2008), Catalan abbot
- Cassia O'Reilly (born 1996), Irish singer-songwriter

== Fictional characters ==
- Cassia, a fictional playable character in Heroes of the Storm
- Cassia Maria Reyes, the protagonist of the Matched trilogy by Ally Condie
- Cassia Orsellio, a recruitable party member in the video game Warhammer 40,000: Rogue Trader

== See also ==
- Cassia (disambiguation)
