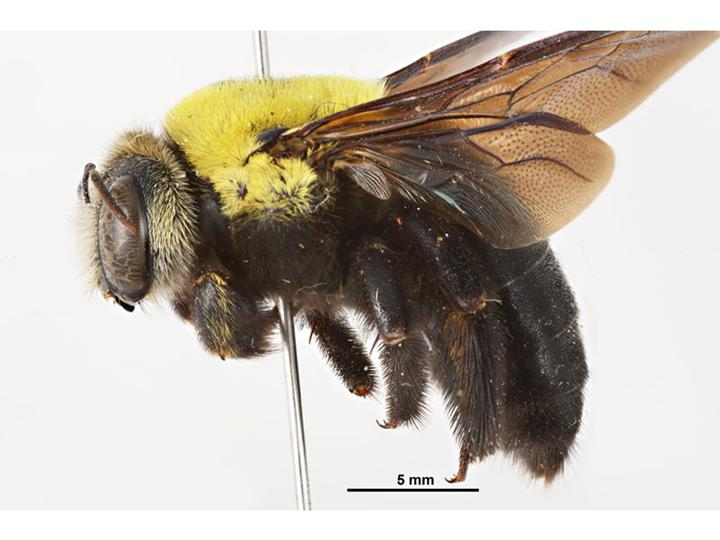
- Female

Scientific classification
- Kingdom: Animalia
- Phylum: Arthropoda
- Clade: Pancrustacea
- Class: Insecta
- Order: Hymenoptera
- Family: Apidae
- Genus: Xylocopa
- Species: X. aruana

Binomial name
- Xylocopa aruana Ritsema, 1876

= Xylocopa aruana =

Species of bee

Xylocopa aruana or Xylocopa (Koptortosoma) aruana, also known as the great carpenter bee, is a species of carpenter bee. It is native to Australasia. It was described in 1876 by Dutch entomologist Coenraad Ritsema.

== Description ==
The body length is 21–26 mm; wing length 17–20 mm.

== Distribution and habitat ==
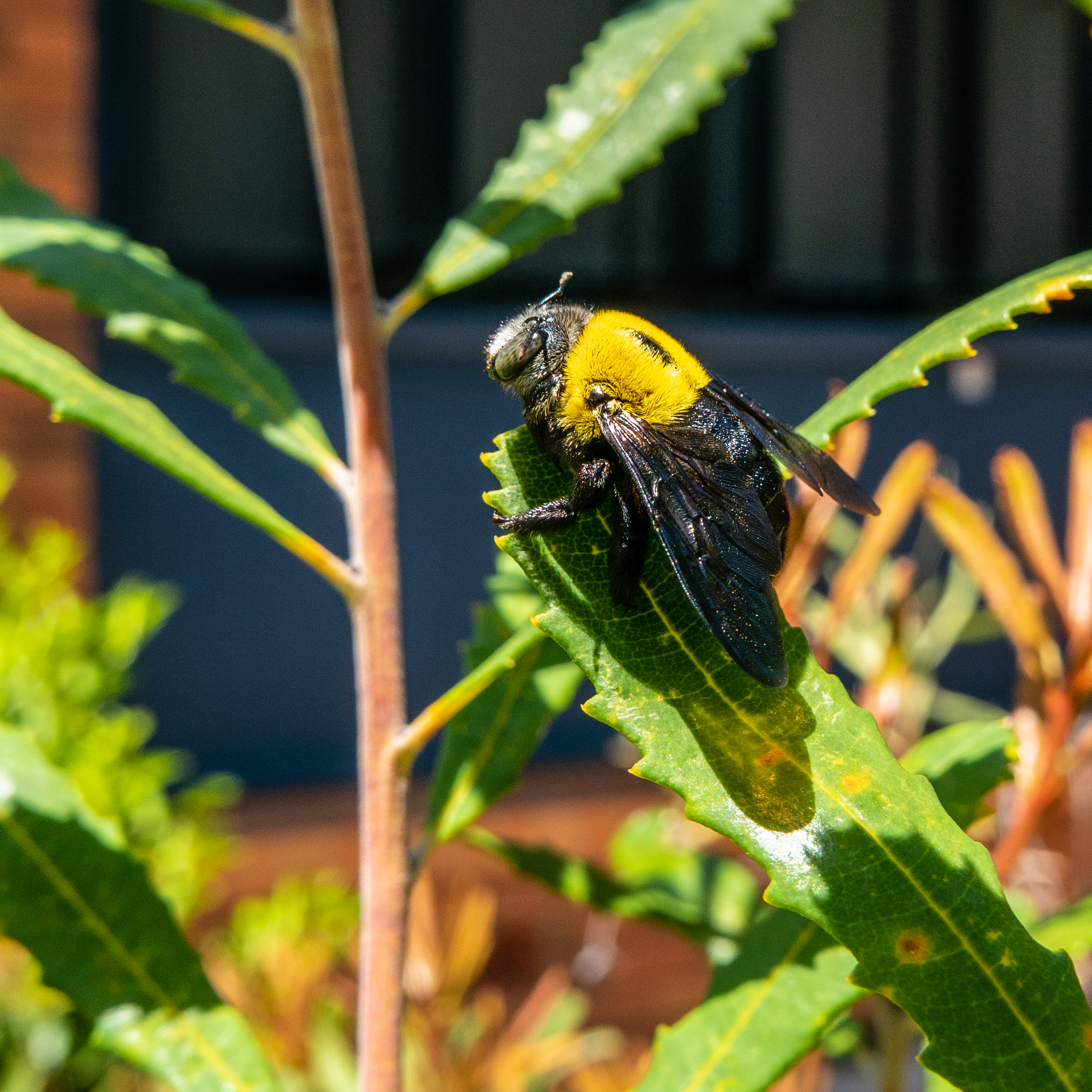
At Geebung, Queensland

The species occurs in New Guinea, including nearby islands and New Britain. In Australia it has a mainly northern and eastern coastal distribution, occurring in all mainland states and the Northern Territory. The lectotype was collected in the Aru Islands. Associated habitats include open forests and shrubland, as well as agricultural land and gardens.

== Behaviour ==
The adults are mainly solitary, flying mellivores. Flowering plants visited by the bees include Wisteria, Acacia, Crotalaria, Eucalyptus, Passiflora, Anacardium, Cajanus, Canavalia, Cassia, Clitoria, Hyptis, Jasminum, Laburnum and Solanum species. The bees nest in cylindrical tunnels bored into dead, dry wood, with each larva in a separate provisioned cell.

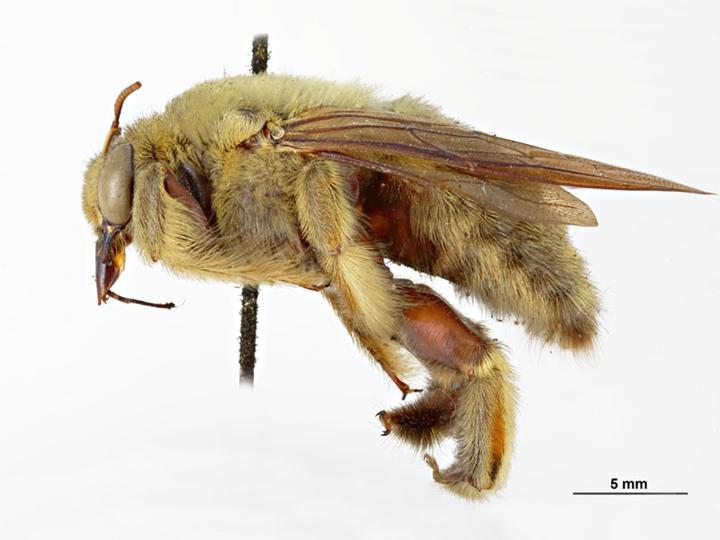
Male
