= Keisha =

Given name

- Pronunciation: /ˈkiːʃə/
- Gender: female
- Language: Hebrew

Origin
- Meaning: Restored to the heart of God; Favourite one Cassia tree

Other names
- Related names: Keziah

Keisha is a female given name which has multiple meaning across languages like "Favourite", "Restored to the heart of God" or "Cassia Tree".

In Hebrew, Keisha is likely derived from Keziah, a Hebrew name that means 'cinnamon bark'. Keziah, in the Hebrew Bible, was one of three daughters born to Job (Job 42:14–17) (1) as part of his restoration following the trials he encountered in the first phase of his life.

It is considered an African-American name in the United States.

Notable people named Keisha include:

- Keisha Lance Bottoms (born 1970), governor-elect of Georgia, United States
- Keisha Buchanan (born 1984), British singer-songwriter
- Keisha Grey (born 1994), American pornographic actress
- Keisha Hampton (born 1990), American basketball player
- Keisha Castle-Hughes (born 1990), New Zealand film actress
- Keisha Jackson (born 1965), American singer
- Keisha Omilana, American model
- Keisha Schahaff (born c. 1975), Antigua and Barbuda space traveller, first Caribbean woman in space, half of the mother-daughter pair in space
- Keisha White (born 1988), British singer

== See also ==
- Keisha-Dean Soffe (born 1982), New Zealand weightlifter
- Keesha Sharp (born 1973), American actress
- Keesha Franklin, character on The Magic School Bus
- Kesha (disambiguation)
- Keshia, a given name
