= Plínio (footballer, born 1984) =

Brazilian footballer

Personal information
- Full name: Plínio Marcos da Silva
- Date of birth: 31 August 1984 (age 42)
- Place of birth: Juruaia, Brazil
- Height: 1.85 m (6 ft 1 in)
- Position: Defender

Team information
- Current team: Uberlândia

Senior career*
Years	Team	Apps	(Gls)
2004	Matsubara		
2005–2007	Cacerense		
2006	→ Juventus–SC (loan)		
2007	→ Novo Hamburgo (loan)		
2008	CRB	?	(1)
2009	Guarani	0	(0)
2009	América–RN	7	(0)
2010	ASA	32	(0)
2011	Fortaleza	0	(0)
2011	Anapolina	4	(0)
2012	Caldense	4	(0)
2012	Goiânia		
2013	Caldense	2	(0)
2013	Marcílio Dias	2	(0)
2014	Caldense	10	(0)
2014	Inter de Lages	20	(0)
2015	Caldense	12	(1)
2015	Sampaio Corrêa	22	(2)
2016–2017	Botafogo–PB	66	(2)
2018–2019	Botafogo–SP	45	(1)
2020–	Uberlândia	8	(1)
- * Club domestic league appearances and goals as of 22 March 2018

Plínio Marcos da Silva (born 31 August 1984), simply known as Plínio, is a Brazilian footballer who plays for Uberlândia as a defender.

== Career statistics ==
As of 22 March 2018

Club	Season	League			State League		Cup		Continental		Other		Total	
Club	Season	Division	Apps	Goals	Apps	Goals	Apps	Goals	Apps	Goals	Apps	Goals	Apps	Goals
Guarani	2009	Série B	—		12	0	—		—		—		12	0
América–RN	2009	Série B	7	0	—		—		—		—		7	0
ASA	2010	Série B	32	0	—		4	0	—		—		36	0
Fortaleza	2011	Série C	—		16	1	3	0	—		—		19	1
Anapolina	2011	Série D	4	0	—		—		—		—		4	0
Caldense	2012	Mineiro	—		2	0	—		—		—		2	0
Caldense	2013	Mineiro	—		2	0	—		—		—		2	0
Caldense	2014	Mineiro	—		10	0	3	0	—		—		13	0
Caldense	2015	Série D	—		12	1	—		—		—		12	1
Caldense	Subtotal		—		26	1	3	0	—		—		29	1
Marcílio Dias	2013	Série D	2	0	—		—		—		—		2	0
Sampaio Corrêa	2015	Série B	22	2	—		—		—		—		22	2
Botafogo–PB	2016	Série C	16	0	—		7	2	—		6 (Note: Appearance(s) in Copa do Nordeste)	0	29	2
Botafogo–PB	2017	Série C	16	0	—		1	0	—		3	0	20	0
Botafogo–PB	Subtotal		32	0	—		8	2	—		9	0	49	2
Botafogo–SP	2018	Série C	—		13	0	—		—		—		13	0
Career total			99	2	67	2	18	2	0	0	9	0	193	6
