= Cássio (footballer, born 1986) =

Brazilian footballer

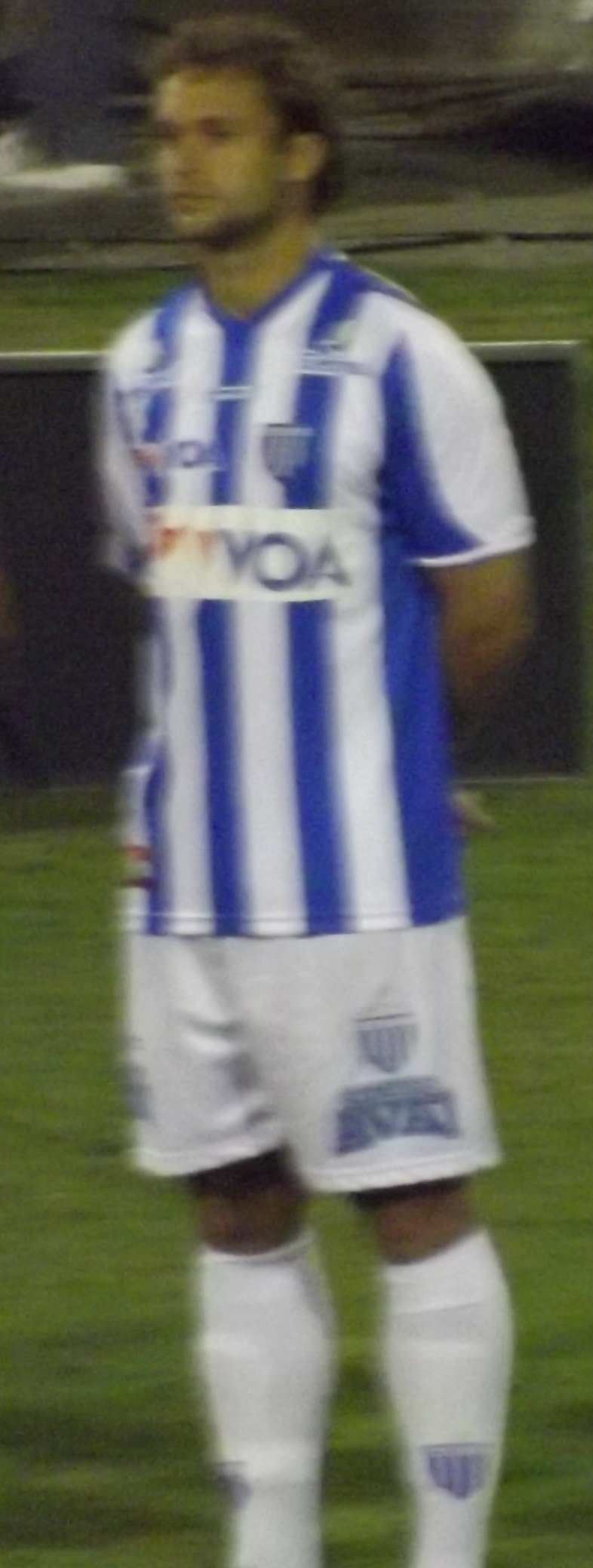
- Cassio playing for Avaí in 2012

Personal information
- Full name: Cássio Alessandro de Souza
- Date of birth: 8 July 1986 (age 40)
- Place of birth: Porto Alegre, Brazil
- Height: 1.82 m (5 ft 11 1/2 in)
- Position: Centre back

Team information
- Current team: Avaí

Senior career*
Years	Team	Apps	(Gls)
2005–2007	RS Futebol	0	(0)
2005–2007	→ Juventude (loan)	1	(0)
2007	→ Avaí (loan)	17	(0)
2008–2010	Desportivo Brasil	0	(0)
2008	→ Avaí (loan)		
2009–2010	→ Fluminense (loan)	15	(0)
2011–2012	Avaí	26	(1)
2013	Guarani	0	(0)
2013	Fortaleza	0	(0)
2013	ASA	8	(0)
2014	Comercial	0	(0)
2014–	Avaí	0	(0)
- * Club domestic league appearances and goals as of 30 November 2014

Cássio Alessandro de Souza (born 8 July 1986), simply known as Cássio, is a Brazilian footballer who plays for Avaí as a central defender.

== Club career ==
Born in Porto Alegre, Rio Grande do Sul, Cássio was signed by RS Futebol in December 2004 along with his twin brother Rafael. They signed a 5-year contract. In March 2005 they were loaned to Juventude in 3-year contract. Cássio made his Brazilian Série A debut on 26 October 2006. In June 2007 he was loaned to Avaí in 2-year deal, which Rafael already arrived in March. After a season with Avaí at Série B, he was signed by Traffic Group as an investment (through subsidiary Desportivo Brasil) and loaned back to Avaí in 2 1/2-year deal. In 2008 the team finished as the third and promoted. Traffic Group then loaned him to Série A side Fluminense, another club partner, in 2-year deal. He only played 15 Série A games in 2 seasons. However, he also played in 2009 Copa Sudamericana final first leg.

In February 2011 he returned to Avaí in 2-year deal as his twin brother transferred to Europe. It was reported that Avaí held some rights and Traffic held 40% before the transaction.

== Honours ==
Fluminense

- Campeonato Brasileiro Série A: 2010
