= Innokenty Omulevsky =

Russian writer and poet (1836–1883)

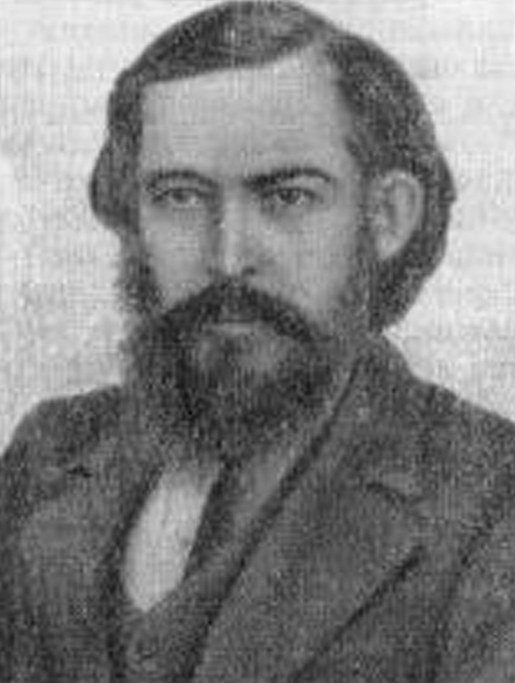
- Born: Innokenty Vasilyevich Fyodorov; Иннокентий Васильевич Фёдоров; 26 October 1836; Petropavlovsk-Kamchatsky, Russian Empire
- Died: 26 December 1883 (aged 47); Saint Petersburg, Russian Empire
- Occupations: Writer, poet

Innokenty Vasilyevich Fyodorov (Russian: Иннокентий Васильевич Фёдоров; 26 October 1836 in Petropavlovsk-Kamchatsky, Imperial Russia – 26 December 1883 in Saint Petersburg, Imperial Russia) was a Russian writer, poet and translator better known under his pen name Omulevsky (Омулевский) and occasionally referred to as Fyodorov-Omulevsky.

== Career ==
Originally a translator (who started out in 1847 by publishing a book of translations from Adam Mickiewicz) and then a poet (writing under the pseudonyms Kamchatkin, Kamchadal, Merry Poet, Siberian Poet), Omulevsky in 1862 moved to work in Irkutsk where he contributed to the local Amur newspaper and took part in the local narodnik groups. He became famous when his debut novel Step by Step (Шаг за шагом) came out (originally in Delo in 1870, then a year later as a separate edition). Banned in 1874, just before it was about to be re-issued, the novel in retrospect has been described (by the critic Mark Azadovsky) as "the vivid monument for the Russian enlightenment led by this country's revolutionary intelligentsia, fighting for the American-type of capitalist development in Russia" as well as "highly popular among the Russia youth but soon forgotten" example of the Russian politically-charged fiction of 1860s "devoted to the idea of portraying 'an ideal new man', fighting against prejudices and for creating the new, rational and just society," according to Innokenty Fyodorov, the Brockhaus and Efron Encyclopedic Dictionary biographer.

In 1873 in Saint Petersburg he was arrested (for allegedly agitating against the government), spent a year in jail, was freed for the lack of evidence but had almost lost his sight by the time of his release. His second novel Trying's Not a Joke (Popytka – ne shutka, Попытка — не шутка, 1873) remained unfinished.

The Collected Works by Omulevsky titled Songs of Life (Pesni zhizni, Песни жизни) came out posthumously in 1883. The extended version of it in two volumes was released in 1906.
