= Rodrigo Lobão =

Brazilian footballer (born 1993)

Personal information
- Full name: Rodrigo da Conceição Santos
- Date of birth: 17 July 1993 (age 33)
- Place of birth: Salvador, Brazil
- Height: 1.93 m (6 ft 4 in)
- Position: Centre back

Team information
- Current team: Linense

Youth career
- 2013: Mogi Mirim

Senior career*
Years	Team	Apps	(Gls)
2014	Rio Branco-AC	14	(2)
2015	Ponte Preta	2	(0)
2015	→ Salgueiro (loan)	0	(0)
2015–2017	Linense	25	(1)
2016	→ Tupi (loan)	2	(1)
2017–2019	Santos	0	(0)
2018–2019	→ CSA (loan)	10	(1)
2019	→ Bangu (loan)	7	(0)
2020	Bangu	21	(0)
2021–	Linense	3	(1)
- * Club domestic league appearances and goals as of 20:41, 11 April 2021 (UTC)

Rodrigo da Conceição Santos (born 17 July 1993), known as Rodrigo Lobão or simply Lobão, is a Brazilian footballer who plays as a central defender for Linense.

== Club career ==
Born in Salvador, Bahia, Lobão was a Mogi Mirim youth graduate. In February 2014 he was presented at Rio Branco-AC, and made his senior debut on 19 February by starting in a 1–1 away draw against Real Noroeste, for the year's Copa do Brasil.

Lobão scored his first senior goal on 13 April 2014, netting the opener in a 3–0 away win against Vasco da Gama-AC for the Campeonato Acreano championship. He featured regularly for the club during the season, also helping his side win the state league.

In 2015, Lobão joined Ponte Preta and was immediately loaned to Salgueiro for the Campeonato Pernambucano. After his loan expired, he returned to his parent club and made his debut on 7 May, starting in a 2–1 away win against Moto Club for the national cup.

On 30 July 2015, Lobão terminated his contract with Ponte, and joined Linense in October. The following 29 August, after winning the Copa Paulista, he was loaned to Série B side Tupi until the end of the year.

After being a regular starter during the 2017 Campeonato Paulista, Lobão signed a permanent contract with Santos and was loaned to CSA in the Série C, until December. After achieving promotion to the second division as champions, his loan was extended for a further season, but was cut short on 9 May 2018 after he was rarely used.

On 17 November 2018, Lobão joined Bangu also in a temporary deal, for the 2019 Campeonato Carioca. On 3 January 2020, he signed a permanent one-year deal with Bangu after his contract with Santos expired.

== Career statistics ==
As of 11 April 2021

Club	Season	League			State League		Cup		Continental		Other		Total	
Club	Season	Division	Apps	Goals	Apps	Goals	Apps	Goals	Apps	Goals	Apps	Goals	Apps	Goals
Rio Branco	2014	Série D	3	1	11	1	3	0	—		—		17	2
Ponte Preta	2015	Série A	0	0	—		2	0	—		—		2	0
Salgueiro (loan)	2015	Série C	0	0	0	0	—		—		1 (Note: Appearance(s) in Copa do Nordeste)	0	1	0
Linense	2015	Paulista	—		—		—		—		3 (Note: Appearance(s) in Copa Paulista)	0	3	0
Linense	2016	Série D	7	0	4	0	1	0	—		—		12	0
Linense	2017	Paulista	—		14	1	—		—		—		14	1
Linense	Total		7	0	18	1	1	0	—		3	0	29	1
Tupi (loan)	2016	Série B	2	1	—		—		—		—		2	1
Santos	2017	Série A	0	0	—		—		—		—		0	0
CSA (loan)	2017	Série C	5	0	—		—		—		1 (Note: Appearance(s) in 2018 Pré-Copa do Nordeste)	1	6	1
CSA (loan)	2018	Série B	0	0	5	1	0	0	—		4	0	9	1
CSA (loan)	Total		5	0	5	1	0	0	—		5	1	15	2
Bangu	2019	Carioca	—		7	0	—		—		—		7	0
Bangu	2020	Série D	10	0	11	0	1	1	—		—		22	1
Bangu	Total		10	0	18	0	1	1	—		—		29	1
Linense	2021	Paulista A3	—		3	1	—		—		—		3	1
Career total			27	2	55	4	7	1	0	0	9	1	98	8

== Honours ==
Rio Branco-AC

- Campeonato Acreano: 2014

Linense

- Copa Paulista: 2015

CSA

- Campeonato Brasileiro Série C: 2017
- Campeonato Alagoano: 2018
