= Kesha Township =

Kesha Township 颗砂乡
- Township
- Etymology: "Sandy Township"
- Location in Hunan Location in China
- Coordinates: 29°05′50.35″N 109°57′9.2″E
- Country: China
- Province: Hunan
- Prefecture: Xiangxi Tujia and Miao Autonomous Prefecture
- County: Yongshun
- villages: 10

Government
  - Party Secretary: Jiang Libo
  - Mayor: Shu Kunfu

Area
  - Total: 77.67 km^{2} (29.99 sq mi)
- Elevation: 328 m (1,076 ft)

Population
  - Total: 4,052
  - Density: 52.17/km^{2} (135.1/sq mi)
- Time zone: UTC+8 (China Standard)
- Postal code: 416715
- Area code: 743
- Website: ksx.ysx.gov.cn

Kesha (Chinese: 颗砂乡; pinyin: kēshāxiāng) is a township nestled in the mountains of Yongshun County, northwestern Hunan province. There are ten villages which are in its jurisdiction.

== See also ==
- List of township-level divisions of Hunan
