= Dalton (footballer, born 1986) =

Brazilian footballer

Personal information
- Full name: Dalton Alan Munaretto
- Date of birth: 8 September 1986 (age 40)
- Place of birth: Chapecó, Brazil
- Height: 1.98 m (6 ft 6 in)
- Position: Goalkeeper

Team information
- Current team: Velo Clube

Youth career
- 2004: Figueirense

Senior career*
Years	Team	Apps	(Gls)
2005–2009	Figueirense	8	(0)
2005	→ Malutron-PR (loan)	0	(0)
2008	→ Mirassol (loan)	0	(0)
2010	Rio Claro	0	(0)
2011	Cruzeiro-RS	0	(0)
2011	Metropolitano	7	(0)
2011	Hercílio Luz	0	(0)
2012	Guaratinguetá	0	(0)
2012	Paysandu	11	(0)
2013–2014	Campinense	0	(0)
2014	Vilhena	2	(0)
2014–2015	→ Nacional (SP) (loan)	0	(0)
2015	Parauapebas	3	(0)
2015–2016	Ríver	15	(0)
2017	Rio Branco-PR	13	(0)
2017–2018	CSA	0	(0)
2019	Boa Esporte	2	(0)
2020	Rio Branco-PR	10	(0)
2020–2021	Londrina	47	(0)
2022	Linense	15	(0)
2022–2023	Vitória	17	(0)
2024	Botafogo-PB	45	(0)
2025–	Velo Clube	3	(0 0 October 2023)
- * Club domestic league appearances and goals

Dalton Alan Munaretto or simply Dalton (born 8 September 1986), is a Brazilian goalkeeper who plays for Velo Clube.

Dalton played for Figueirense in the 2009 Campeonato Brasileiro Série B.

He was in 2010 on a trial with Azerbaijani side FK Khazar Lankaran.

== Honours ==
- Campeonato Catarinense: 2006
- Série B 2023 2023
