= Keshia =

Keshia is a feminine given name which may refer to:

- Keshia Chanté (born 1988), Canadian singer-songwriter, model and actress
- Keshia Grant (born 1987), New Zealand netballer
- Keshia Knight Pulliam (born 1979), American actress
- Keshia Pollack Porter, American injury epidemiologist

== See also ==
- Keyshia Cole (born 1981), American singer
- Keisha, a given name
