= Murilo Gomes =

Brazilian footballer

Personal information
- Full name: Murilo Gomes Ferreira
- Date of birth: 19 June 1990 (age 36)
- Place of birth: São Paulo, Brazil
- Height: 1.90 m (6 ft 3 in)
- Position: Centre back

Team information
- Current team: Bitonto

Youth career
- 2000–2005: Corinthians
- 2005–2011: Palmeiras

Senior career*
Years	Team	Apps	(Gls)
2008–2011	Palmeiras B	111	(12)
2008–2010	→ Palmeiras	0	(0)
2011–2012	→ Karpaty (loan)	0	(0)
2012	Bragantino	1	(1)
2012–2013	Penapolense	13	(0)
2013	Aparecidense	21	(5)
2013–2014	Luverdense	17	(5)
2014	Aparecidense	13	(0)
2014–2015	Ipatinga	9	(0)
2015	Treze	11	(0)
2015	Gama	15	(0)
2016	Sukhothai	0	(0)
2016–2017	FBC Gravina	13	(0)
2017	Palmese	11	(1)
2017–2018	Campobasso	16	(3)
2019	Sport Boys	29	(4)
2020	Criciúma	2	(0)
2021	Amazonas		
2021–2022	Tiferno	11	(0)
2022	Amazonas	3	(0)
2022–	Bitonto	28	(1)
- * Club domestic league appearances and goals as of 8 October 2023

Murilo Gomes Ferreira or just Murilo Gomes (born 19 June 1990), is a Brazilian footballer who plays as a centre back for Italian Serie D club Bitonto.

== Career ==
He started at Corinthians, where he played up, but in 2005 went to the Palmeiras.

In 2008 debuted for Palmeiras.
