= Sandro (footballer, born 1988) =

Brazilian footballer

Personal information
- Full name: Sandro Silva de Souza
- Date of birth: May 17, 1988 (age 38)
- Place of birth: Rio de Janeiro, Brazil
- Height: 1.80 m (5 ft 11 in)
- Position: Centre back

Team information
- Current team: Maricá

Youth career
- 2006–2007: Fluminense

Senior career*
Years	Team	Apps	(Gls)
2007–2011	Fluminense	7	(0)
2008–2009	→ Ituano (loan)	3	(0)
2009–2011	→ Kazma (loan)	20	(1)
2011–2012	Figueirense	9	(0)
2013	Joinville	32	(3)
2014–2017	Ceará	69	(7)
2017	Santa Cruz	9	(0)
2018–2019	Criciúma	78	(10)
2020	Renofa Yamaguchi	10	(1)
2021–2022	Brusque	12	(0)
2023	Volta Redonda	9	(1)
2023–2024	Marcílio Dias	18	(0)
2024–	Maricá	22	(1)
- * Club domestic league appearances and goals as of 22:10, 26 September 2020 (UTC)

Sandro Silva de Souza or simply Sandro (born May 17, 1988 in Rio de Janeiro), is a Brazilian centre back who plays for Maricá.
