= Roberto Pítio =

Brazilian footballer

Personal information
- Full name: Roberto Nascimento dos Santos
- Date of birth: 5 September 1987 (age 39)
- Place of birth: Maceió, Brazil
- Height: 1.83 m (6 ft 0 in)
- Position: Forward

Team information
- Current team: Marcílio Dias

Youth career
- 2004–2007: Iraty

Senior career*
Years	Team	Apps	(Gls)
2007–2008	Iraty		
2008	Operário		
2009	Londrina		
2009	Operário		
2010	Spartak Trnava	12	(2)
2010	São Bento		
2011	Corinthians Paranaense	9	(1)
2012	Noroeste	0	(0)
2013	Velo Clube	0	(0)
2013	Sertãozinho	0	(0)
2014	CRAC	4	(0)
2014–2015	Central de Caruaru	0	(0)
2016	Rio Branco-PR	0	(0)
2016–2017	Gama	0	(0)
2017	Bragantino	13	(1)
2018	Fluminense de Feira	0	(0)
2018	JL Chiangmai United		
2018–2019	ASA	0	(0)
2019	→ Real (loan)	0	(0)
2019	Ferroviária	1	(0)
2020–	Marcílio Dias	0	(0)
- * Club domestic league appearances and goals as of 22:30, 28 April 2020 (UTC)

Roberto Nascimento dos Santos (born 5 September 1987), commonly known as Roberto Pítio, is a Brazilian professional football who plays as a forward for Marcílio Dias.

== Career ==
Pítio was born in Maceió.

He joined Spartak Trnava in January 2010.
