= Pio (footballer, born 1988) =

Brazilian footballer

Personal information
- Full name: Francisco Hércules de Araújo
- Date of birth: 23 January 1988 (age 38)
- Place of birth: Fortaleza, Brazil
- Height: 1.71 m (5 ft 7 1/2 in)
- Position: Midfielder

Team information
- Current team: Maracanã

Youth career
- 2007: Fortaleza

Senior career*
Years	Team	Apps	(Gls)
2007–2008	Icasa		
2009–2010	Treze	2	(2)
2010–2011	ABC	38	(5)
2012	Guaratinguetá	0	(0)
2012–2013	Monte Azul	0	(0)
2012–2013	→ Gil Vicente (loan)	12	(1)
2013	→ Mirassol (loan)	0	(0)
2013–2014	Botafogo–PB	28	(5)
2015–2016	Fortaleza	35	(7)
2017	Linense	0	(0)
2017–2018	Ceará	30	(4)
2018	CSA	14	(1)
2019	Red Bull Brasil	0	(0)
2019	Bragantino	12	(1)
2020	Água Santa	5	(0)
2020–2021	Ferroviária	10	(0)
2022	Fluminense-PI	17	(6)
2022	Manaus	2	(0)
2023	Fluminense-PI	16	(2)
2023	Pacajus	6	(2)
2024–	Maracanã	1	(0)
- * Club domestic league appearances and goals as of 6 August 2023

Francisco Hércules de Araújo (born 23 January 1988), known commonly as Pio, is a Brazilian footballer who plays for Maracanã as a midfielder. He became part of the Red Bull Bragantino squad when Red Bull Brasil merged with Clube Atlético Bragantino in April 2019.

== Career statistics ==
As of 10 May 2019

Club	Season	League			State League		Cup		Continental		Other		Total	
Club	Season	Division	Apps	Goals	Apps	Goals	Apps	Goals	Apps	Goals	Apps	Goals	Apps	Goals
Treze	2010	Série D	2	2	22	8	1	0	—		—		25	10
ABC	2010	Série C	6	0	—		—		—		—		6	0
ABC	2011	Série B	32	5	22	0	4	0	—		—		58	5
ABC	Subtotal		38	5	22	0	4	0	—		—		64	5
Guaratinguetá	2012	Série B	—		12	3	—		—		—		12	3
Gil Vicente	2012–13	Primeira Liga	12	1	—		3	0	—		1 (Note: All appearance(s) in Taça da Liga)	0	16	1
Mirassol	2013	Paulista	—		14	3	—		—		—		14	3
Botafogo–PB	2013	Série D	15	2	—		—		—		—		15	2
Botafogo–PB	2014	Série C	13	3	18	7	4	0	—		4 (Note: All appearance(s) in Copa do Nordeste)	2	39	12
Botafogo–PB	Subtotal		28	5	18	7	4	0	—		4	2	54	14
Fortaleza	2015	Série C	18	4	15	3	3	0	—		7	1	43	8
Fortaleza	2016	Série C	17	3	14	1	8	3	—		6	2	45	9
Fortaleza	Subtotal		35	7	29	4	11	3	—		13	3	88	17
Linense	2017	Paulista	—		10	2	—		—		—		10	2
Ceará	2017	Série B	22	3	—		—		—		—		22	3
Ceará	2018	Série A	1	0	9	2	3	0	—		6	0	19	2
Ceará	Subtotal		23	3	9	2	3	0	—		6	0	41	5
Red Bull Brasil	2019	Paulista	—		9	0	—		—		—		9	0
Bragantino	2019	Série B	1	0	—		—		—		—		1	0
Career total			139	23	145	29	26	3	0	0	24	5	334	60
