= Kassio (footballer, born 1992) =

Brazilian footballer

Personal information
- Full name: Kassio Fernando Rocha Martins
- Date of birth: 14 September 1992 (age 34)
- Place of birth: Brazil
- Height: 1.77 m (5 ft 10 in)
- Position: Midfielder

Youth career
- –2009: Vila Nova
- 2009–2010: Santos

Senior career*
Years	Team	Apps	(Gls)
2011–2012	América T.O.	2	(0)
2012	Botev Vratsa	4	(0)
2013	Arapongas EC	1	(0)
2014–2017	Ríver AC	40	(2)
Total		47	(2)
- * Club domestic league appearances and goals

Kassio Fernando Rocha Martins (born 14 September 1992) commonly known as Kassio, is a Brazilian former professional footballer who played as a midfielder.

== Career ==
On 23 April 2011, Kassio made his debut for América Teófilo Otoni in an 8–1 home loss against Cruzeiro in their semi-final first leg tie of the Campeonato Mineiro.
