= Wallacer =

Brazilian footballer

Personal information
- Full name: Wallacer de Andrade Medeiros
- Date of birth: 3 June 1986 (age 40)
- Place of birth: Macaé, Brazil
- Height: 1.78 m (5 ft 10 in)
- Position: Forward

Senior career*
Years	Team	Apps	(Gls)
2006–2010	Macaé	14	(8)
2010	Volta Redonda	7	(0)
2011	Persibo Bojonegoro	24	(7)
2011–2012	Macaé	28	(3)
2012	Bragantino	6	(0)
2013–2014	Caxias	67	(11)
2015	Juventude	39	(9)
2016	Operário Ferroviário	2	(0)
2016–2017	Juventude	61	(10)
2018	Criciúma	13	(0)
2019	Remo	2	(0)
2019	Persipura Jayapura	0	(0)
2019–2021	Pelotas	28	(9)
- * Club domestic league appearances and goals

Wallacer de Andrade Medeiros (born 3 June 1986), known as Wallacer, is a Brazilian former professional footballer who plays as forward.

== Career ==
Wallacer was born in Macaé and started playing football as a child. At 16 years old, he played in the Sub-17 Macaé Cup for the first time.

He joined Persipura Jayapura on 12 February 2019. He left the club again in May 2019 because the club was missing some of the players documents from his former club.

== Career statistics ==
As of 17 January 2017

Appearances and goals by club, season and competition
Club	Season	League			State League		Cup		Conmebol		Other		Total	
Club	Season	Division	Apps	Goals	Apps	Goals	Apps	Goals	Apps	Goals	Apps	Goals	Apps	Goals
Macaé	2008	Carioca	—		15	2	—		—		—		15	2
Macaé	2009	Carioca	—		13	8	—		—		—		13	8
Macaé	2010	Carioca	—		1	0	—		—		—		1	0
Macaé	Total		—		29	10	—		—		—		29	10
Volta Redonda	2010	Carioca	—		7	0	—		—		—		7	0
Macaé	2012	Série D	12	2	16	1	—		—		—		28	3
Bragantino	2012	Série B	6	0	—		—		—		—		6	0
Caxias	2013	Série C	20	0	13	1	2	0	—		—		35	1
Caxias	2014	Série C	17	3	17	7	—		—		—		34	10
Caxias	Total		37	3	30	8	2	0	—		—		69	11
Juventude	2015	Série C	18	4	18	5	—		—		—		36	9
Operário Ferroviário	2016	Paranaense	—		2	0	—		—		—		2	0
Juventude	2016	Série C	21	4	10	2	8	3	—		—		39	9
Criciúma	2018													
Remo	2019													
Persipura Jayapura	2019													
Pelotas	2019													
Career total			94	13	112	26	10	3	0	0	0	0	216	42
