= Cassia =

Cassia typically refers to cassia bark, the spice made from the bark of East Asian evergreen trees.

Cassia may also refer to:

== Plants ==
=== Cinnamon trees ===
- Cinnamomum cassia (肉桂, ròuguì), the cassia or Chinese cinnamon, found in southern China and Indochina
- Other East Asian species of Cinnamomum, such as Cinnamomum burmannii (Indonesian cinnamon) and C. loureiroi, Saigon cinnamon

=== Osmanthus ===
- Osmanthus fragrans (桂花, guìhuā), is the osmanthus or sweet olive found in southern China and Indochina

=== Beans ===
- Cassia (genus), a genus of trees and shrubs in the bean family Fabaceae.
- Senna (plant), a genus of the bean family Fabaceae including species formerly treated in the genus Cassia, and used in herbal medicine:
  - Senna obtusifolia, the Chinese senna or sicklepod
  - Senna artemisioides, silver cassia or feathery cassia
- Vachellia farnesiana, another member of Fabaceae

== Food ==
- Cassia gum, a food additive made from the seeds of Senna obtusifolia
- Cassia tea or senna tea, an herbal tea made from the seeds of Senna obtusifolia
- Carao syrup, or molasses, is made from boiling down bean pods of Cassia grandis, (Spanish: carao). It is a nutritious sweetener.

== People ==
- Cassia (name)
- Cassia gens

== Places ==
- Cássia, a city in Minas Gerais, Brazil
- Cassia County, Idaho
- Cassia Creek, in the Mining regions of Idaho
- Via Cassia, a Roman road
- Bandar Cassia, the 3rd satellite city of Penang, Malaysia

== Other uses ==
- Cassia flask, a laboratory flask
- Cassia, one of hotel brands of Banyan Group

== See also ==
- Cassiar (disambiguation)
- Cassio (disambiguation)
- Cassius (disambiguation)
- Cassiane (born 1972), Brazilian gospel singer
- Kassia, Byzantine saint and hymnographer
