= 2015 Grêmio FBPA season =

Grêmio
2015 season
- President: Romildo Bolzan Jr.
- Manager: Luiz Felipe Scolari (until 19 May); James Freitas (caretaker) (from 20 until 25 May); Roger Machado (from 26 May)
- Stadium: Arena do Grêmio
- Campeonato Brasileiro: 3rd
- Copa do Brasil: Quarter-finals
- Campeonato Gaúcho: Runners-up
- Top goalscorer: League: Mamute (2); All: Luan (6)
- Highest home attendance: 46,909 (vs. Internacional – 26 April)
- Lowest home attendance: 9,021 (vs. Veranópolis – 14 February)
- Average home league attendance: 19,511 (all competitions)
Home colours	Away colours	Third colours

The 2015 season is Grêmio Foot-Ball Porto Alegrense's 112th season in existence and the club's 10th consecutive season in the top division of Brazilian football. At this season, Grêmio participate in the Campeonato Brasileiro Série A, the Copa do Brasil and the Campeonato Gaúcho.

== Season overview ==
=== Pre-season ===
At the end of the 2014 Grêmio F.B.P.A. season, without qualify for the 2015 Copa Libertadores de América, the new board of directors of the Grêmio, with the president Romildo Bolzan Jr., decided to reduce the monthly payroll of the club from €2.2 million to €1.5 million. For the season, with the reduction of the monthly payroll, the Grêmio decided to invest in its academy, using in their pre-season more than 10 players of youth squads. With it, the Grêmio did not exercise the option of purchase of two players who were with loans to a close, and Alan Ruiz and Dudu returned to their respective clubs. Also, the contract of Zé Roberto was not renewed, leaving him free to sign with another club, which ended up being Palmeiras. Pará also left the club on season-long loan, moving to Flamengo as payment of a debt that the Grêmio had with the Carioca club since 2000 because of a Rodrigo Mendes transfer.

With the end of the 2014 season, the Grêmio received as a loan return almost 20 players, seeing that the vast majority began to train separately from the First team squad waiting for a new loans. The young goalkeeper Jakson Follmann was loaned to Linense to gain experience in a half-season deal. Rodrigo Sabiá, which is not part of the club's plans, was again loaned, this time to Paulista also in a half-season contract. The midfielder Guilherme Biteco goes definitively to 1899 Hoffenheim after having been selling to the club in October 2012, but followed at Grêmio on loan until then.

On 17 December, the Grêmio announced its largest purchase for the season, the playmaker Douglas, acquiring in a free transfer from Corinthians, signing a contract until the end of the season. Also on the 17th was announced the departure of Mateus Magro to Aparecidense, who was with his contract with Grêmio ending. Two days later, announced the signing of polyvalent player Marcelo Oliveira, signed from 2014 Campeonato Brasileiro Série A champions Cruzeiro, also in the free transfer deal, signing a contract until December 2016.

As well as Follmann, the club also loaned Bressan to Flamengo, however, in a season-long deal. The club also renewed the contract of Cristian Riveros, which would end in mid-2015, but did not reveal the new term. It was also announced that Saimon, Léo Gago and Marco Antônio will not have their contracts renewed, thus being free to sign with another club. Also did not have his contract renewed the goalkeeper Gustavo Busatto, who went to América-RN. Already Bergson, who had returned from loan, confirmed a new loan deal, this time to a K League club side, which yet has not been disclosed.

On Christmas Eve, the club announced its latest deal in 2014, revealing the purchase of Pedro Geromel for an undisclosed amount from FC Köln until December 2017. Until then, he was on loan until the mid of 2016, which may leave the club if a purchase proposal was offered to the German club by another team. On the same day, the executive of football Rui Costa confirmed that the Grêmio has no more interest in Edinho and he did not participate in the 2015 season.

On the first working day of 2015, were announced two loans until the end of the season. Tony confirmed his departure to Bahia and Douglas Grolli will pass another season playing at the Chapecoense. On 5 January, another season-long loan deal was announced, this time with the forward Fernandinho going to Serie A club Hellas Verona. On the same day, it was also announced the half-season loan of Maxi Rodríguez to Universidad de Chile, to compete in the Copa Libertadores de América. On day 6, it was announced that Bergson was loaned to Busan IPark.

== Club ==
=== Staff ===
Board members

- President: Romildo Bolzan Jr.
- Vice-president: Adalberto Preis
- Vice-president: Antônio Dutra Júnior
- Vice-president: Cláudio Oderich
- Vice-president: Marcos Herrmann
- Vice-president: Odorico Roman
- Vice-president: Sergei Costa
- Chief Executive Officer: Gustavo Zanchi
- Director of football: César Pacheco
- Executive of football: Rui Costa
- Superintendent: Antônio Carlos Verardi
- Supervisor of football: Marcelo Rudolph

Coaching staff

- Head coach: Luiz Felipe Scolari (until 19 May) / Roger Machado (from 26 May)
- Assistant coach: Flávio Murtosa (until 19 May) / Roberto Ribas (from 26 May)
- Assistant coach: Ivo Wortmann (until 19 May) / James Freitas (from 26 May)
- Fitness coach: Darlan Schneider (until 19 May) / Rogério Dias (from 26 May)
- Assistant fitness coach: Rogério Dias (until 19 May)
- Assistant fitness coach: Mário Pereira
- Goalkeeper coach: Rogério Godoy
- Performance analyst: Eduardo Cecconi
- Performance analyst: Antônio Cruz

Medical staff

- Head doctor: Saul Berdichevski
- Assistant head doctor: Fábio Krebs
- Doctor: Márcio Bolzoni
- Doctor: Felipe do Canto
- Doctor: Paulo Rabaldo
- Doctor: Márcio Dornelles
- Physiologist: José Leandro
- Physiologist: Rafael Gobbato
- Physiotherapist: Henrique Valente
- Physiotherapist: Felipe Marques
- Massagist: Marco Zeilmann
- Massagist: José Flores
- Massagist: Anderson Meurer
- Nurse: Adriano Welter
- Nutritionist: Katiuce Borges

Other staff

- Press officer: João Paulo Fontoura
- Cameraman: Juares Dagort
- Equipment manager: Marco Severino
- Equipment manager: Danilo Bueno
- Assistant equipment manager: Antônio Marcos
- Butler: Paulo Oliveira
- Chief security: Luiz Fernando Cardoso
- Security: Cristiano Nunes
- Security: Pedro Carvalho
- Security: André Trisch
- Caretaker: Moacir da Luz
- Motorist: Valdeci Coelho

Last updated: 4 October 2015.
Source: Grêmio Foot-Ball Porto Alegrense

=== Kit ===
Supplier: Umbro
Sponsor(s): Banrisul / TIM / Unimed / Tramontina

Home	Away	Third

This is the first season that Umbro supplies kits for Grêmio, after three years of partnership with Topper. The agreement has a duration of four years, that is, until the end of the 2018 season. The presentation of the complete collection for this season took place in on 8 January, at 20:30 UTC−02:00, in Arena do Grêmio. With the slogan "Heart & Soul", the Umbro-based the collection in the Grêmio's tradition, keeping the pattern already known and identified with the club.

== Squad information ==
=== First team squad ===
Players and informations last updated on 4 October 2015.
Note: Flags indicate national team as has been defined under FIFA eligibility rules. Players may hold more than one non-FIFA nationality.

No.	Name	Nat.	Position(s)	Date of birth (age)	Since	Until	Signed from	Apps	Goals	Notes
Goalkeepers
1	Marcelo Grohe	(Brazil)	GK	13 January 1987 (age 39)	2005	2016	Academy	198	0	National team
12	Tiago Machowski	(Brazil)	GK	16 May 1993 (age 33)	2014	2017	Academy	4	0	
20	Léo	(Brazil)	GK	5 March 1995 (age 31)	2014	2017	Academy	0	0	
30	Bruno Grassi	(Brazil)	GK	5 March 1987 (age 39)	2015	2017	(Brazil) Cruzeiro-RS	0	0	
Defenders
2	Rafael Galhardo	(Brazil)	RB / RM	30 October 1991 (age 35)	2015	2015	(Brazil) Santos	8	0	On loan
3	Pedro Geromel	(Brazil)	CB	21 September 1985 (age 41)	2014	2017	(Germany) FC Köln	31	0	On loan
4	Bressan	(Brazil)	CB	15 January 1993 (age 33)	2013	2017	(Brazil) Juventude	60	1	
14	Júnior Tavares	(Brazil)	LB / LM	7 August 1996 (age 30)	2015	2017	Academy	0	0	
18	Lucas Ramon	(Brazil)	RB	23 July 1994 (age 32)	2015	2016	(Brazil) Londrina	0	0	On loan
21	Gabriel Silva	(Brazil)	CB	3 March 1995 (age 31)	2015	2015	(Brazil) Barra-SC	0	0	On loan
22	Marcelo Hermes	(Brazil)	LB / LM	1 February 1995 (age 31)	2015	2016	Academy	0	0	
26	Marcelo Oliveira	(Brazil)	LB / DM / CB	29 March 1987 (age 39)	2015	2016	(Brazil) Cruzeiro	8	1	Vice-captain
31	Rafael Thyere	(Brazil)	CB	17 May 1993 (age 33)	2013	2017	Academy	4	0	
33	Frickson Erazo	(Ecuador)	CB	5 May 1988 (age 38)	2015	2015	(Ecuador) Barcelona SC	7	1	National team / On loan
34	Raul Cardoso	(Brazil)	RB	4 April 1997 (age 29)	2015	2016	Academy	0	0	
—	Gabriel Blos	(Brazil)	CB	28 February 1989 (age 37)	2013	2019	(Brazil) Lajeadense	11	0	Source
Midfielders
5	Walace	(Brazil)	DM	4 April 1995 (age 31)	2014	2018	Academy	20	0	
8	Giuliano	(Brazil)	AM / RM / LM	31 May 1990 (age 36)	2014	2018	(Ukraine) Dnipro Dnipropetrovsk	18	1	
10	Douglas	(Brazil)	AM	18 February 1982 (age 44)	2015	2015	(Brazil) Monte Azul	112	24	On loan
15	Edinho	(Brazil)	DM	15 January 1983 (age 43)	2014	2015	(Brazil) Fluminense	18	0	
16	Araújo	(Brazil)	DM	16 May 1995 (age 31)	2015	2017	Academy	0	0	
17	Ramiro	(Brazil)	DM / RB	22 May 1993 (age 33)	2013	2016	(Brazil) Juventude	82	4	Source
19	Maicon	(Brazil)	CM / AM	14 September 1985 (age 41)	2015	2015	(Brazil) São Paulo	0	0	Source / Captain / On loan
24	Matheus Biteco	(Brazil)	DM / RB	26 August 1995 (age 31)	2015	2015	(Brazil) Barra-SC	29	0	On loan
25	William Schuster	(Brazil)	CM / DM / LB	31 May 1987 (age 39)	2015	2015	(Brazil) Novo Hamburgo	1	0	
27	Lincoln	(Brazil)	AM / LM	7 November 1998 (age 28)	2015	2017	Academy	0	0	
28	Maxi Rodríguez	(Uruguay)	AM	2 October 1990 (age 36)	2013	2017	(Uruguay) Montevideo Wanderers	22	5	
35	Arthur	(Brazil)	DM	12 August 1996 (age 30)	2015	2016	Academy	0	0	
36	Ânderson Balbino	(Brazil)	DM / CB / LB	19 January 1996 (age 30)	2015	2016	Academy	0	0	
37	Moisés Wolschick	(Brazil)	DM / CM / RB	24 September 1994 (age 32)	2015	2016	Academy	0	0	
Forwards
7	Luan	(Brazil)	LW / RW / SS / AM	27 March 1993 (age 33)	2014	2017	Academy	55	9	
9	Braian Rodríguez	(Uruguay)	ST	14 August 1986 (age 40)	2015	2016	(Spain) Real Betis	0	0	On loan
11	Yuri Mamute	(Brazil)	ST	7 May 1995 (age 31)	2011	2018	Academy	26	4	
13	Bobô	(Brazil)	ST	9 January 1985 (age 41)	2015	2016	(Turkey) Kayserispor	3	1	
23	Everton	(Brazil)	LW / SS	28 March 1996 (age 30)	2014	2018	Academy	21	3	
29	Vitinho	(Brazil)	SS / ST	8 September 1990 (age 36)	2015	2015	(Brazil) Guarani-SC	0	0	On loan
32	Pedro Rocha	(Brazil)	SS / ST	1 October 1994 (age 32)	2015	2017	Academy	3	1	
77	Fernandinho	(Brazil)	LW / SS	25 November 1985 (age 40)	2014	2017	(United Arab Emirates) Al-Jazira	3	0	

=== Starting XI ===
4–2–3–1 Formation

According to the most recent line-ups, not most used players (in Notes).

No.	Pos.	Nat.	Name	MS	Notes
1	GK	(Brazil)	Marcelo Grohe	43	
2	DF	(Brazil)	Rafael Galhardo	43	
3	DF	(Brazil)	Pedro Geromel	39	
33	DF	(Ecuador)	Frickson Erazo	38	Rhodolfo has 33 starts.
26	DF	(Brazil)	Marcelo Oliveira	52	
5	MF	(Brazil)	Walace	45	
19	MF	(Brazil)	Maicon (captain)	40	
8	MF	(Brazil)	Giuliano	53	
10	MF	(Brazil)	Douglas	53	
7	MF	(Brazil)	Luan	50	
13	FW	(Brazil)	Bobô	18	

Last updated: 30 Octubre 2015.
Source: Squad statistics and Start formations
Only competitive matches.
Using the most used start formation.
Ordered by position on pitch (from back right to front left).

== Transfers and loans ==
=== Transfers in ===
Date	Pos.	No.	Player	Moving from	Type	Fee
19 December 2014	DF	29	(Brazil) Marcelo Oliveira	(Brazil) Cruzeiro	Transfer	Free
23 January 2015	MF	–	(Brazil) Araújo	(Brazil) Juazeiro-CE	Transfer	Undisclosed
28 January 2015	MF	–	(Brazil) Everton Júnior	(Brazil) Atlético Sorocaba	Transfer	Undisclosed
6 February 2015	DF	22	(Brazil) Gabriel Blos	(Brazil) Lajeadense	Transfer	€160.000
22 April 2015	GK	30	(Brazil) Bruno Grassi	(Brazil) Cruzeiro-RS	Transfer	Free
6 July 2015	MF	25	(Brazil) William Schuster	(Brazil) Novo Hamburgo	Transfer	Free
25 July 2015	FW	13	(Brazil) Bobô	(Turkey) Kayserispor	Transfer	Free

=== Loans in ===
Date	Pos.	No.	Player	Moving from	Type	Fee
17 December 2014	MF	10	(Brazil) Douglas	(Brazil) Monte Azul	Season-long loan	Free
12 January 2015	DF	42	(Brazil) Rafael Galhardo	(Brazil) Santos	Season-long loan	Free
19 January 2015	DF	33	(Ecuador) Frickson Erazo	(Ecuador) Barcelona SC	Season-long loan	Free
27 January 2015	DF	–	(Brazil) Gabriel Silva	(Brazil) Barra-SC	Season-long loan	Free
27 January 2015	MF	31	(Brazil) Matheus Biteco	(Brazil) Barra-SC	Season-long loan	Free
3 March 2015	FW	9	(Uruguay) Braian Rodríguez	(Spain) Real Betis	Season-long loan	€135.000
6 March 2015	MF	19	(Brazil) Maicon	(Brazil) São Paulo	Season-long loan	€390.000
9 March 2015	MF	7	(Uruguay) Cristian Rodríguez	(Spain) Atlético Madrid	Half-season loan	Undisclosed
11 May 2015	FW	29	(Brazil) Vitinho	(Brazil) Guarani-SC	Season-long loan	Free
11 June 2015	DF	18	(Brazil) Lucas Ramon	(Brazil) Londrina	Season-long loan	Free

=== Transfers out ===
Date	Pos.	No.	Player	Moving to	Type	Fee
1 December 2014	MF	11	(Argentina) Alan Ruiz	(Argentina) San Lorenzo	Loan return	Free
1 December 2014	MF	–	(Brazil) Guilherme Biteco	(Germany) 1899 Hoffenheim	Loan return	Free
8 December 2014	FW	7	(Brazil) Dudu	(Ukraine) Dynamo Kyiv	Loan return	Free
9 December 2014	DF	10	(Brazil) Zé Roberto	(Brazil) Palmeiras	Released	Free
19 December 2014	MF	–	(Brazil) Ângelo	(Brazil) Aimoré	Released	Free
23 December 2014	DF	20	(Brazil) Saimon	(Brazil) Vitória	Released	Free
23 December 2014	GK	–	(Brazil) Gustavo Busatto	(Brazil) América-RN	Released	Free
31 December 2014	MF	–	(Brazil) Léo Gago	(Brazil) Bragantino	Released	Free
31 December 2014	MF	–	(Brazil) Marco Antônio	(Qatar) Al-Khor	Released	Free
9 January 2015	MF	16	(Paraguay) Cristian Riveros	(Paraguay) Olimpia	Transfer	€180.000
16 January 2015	DF	–	(Brazil) Cláudio Canavarros	(Brazil) Internacional de Lages	Released	Free
16 January 2015	MF	–	(Brazil) Jeferson Parrudo	(Brazil) Internacional de Lages	Released	Free
16 January 2015	DF	–	(Brazil) Lucas Gabriel	(Brazil) Internacional de Lages	Released	Free
20 January 2015	MF	–	(Brazil) Souza	(Brazil) São Paulo	Transfer	Undisclosed
26 January 2015	DF	–	(Brazil) Lucas Costa	(Brazil) Desportivo Brasil	Loan return	Free
27 January 2015	MF	19	(Brazil) Matheus Biteco	(Germany) 1899 Hoffenheim	Transfer	Undisclosed
27 January 2015	DF	–	(Brazil) Gabriel Silva	(Germany) 1899 Hoffenheim	Transfer	€2.500.000
28 January 2015	MF	–	(Brazil) Natan Chaves	(Brazil) Boa Esporte	Released	Free
28 January 2015	FW	–	(Brazil) Vinícius	(Brazil) Boa Esporte	Released	Free
29 January 2015	FW	–	(Brazil) Júnior Viçosa	(Switzerland) Chiasso	Transfer	Free
3 February 2015	FW	9	(Argentina) Hernán Barcos	(China) Tianjin Teda	Transfer	€2.500.000
10 February 2015	MF	–	(Brazil) Luan Oliveira	(Brazil) Boa Esporte	Released	Free
12 February 2015	DF	–	(Brazil) Douglas Grolli	(Brazil) Cruzeiro	Transfer	Undisclosed
12 February 2015	FW	–	(Bolivia) Marcelo Moreno	(China) Changchun Yatai	Transfer	€2.500.000
5 March 2015	GK	–	(Brazil) Gustavo Pereira	(Brazil) Nova Prata	Released	Free
8 March 2015	DF	–	(Brazil) Cleylton	(Brazil) Internacional de Lages	Released	Free
27 March 2015	MF	–	(Brazil) Adriano	(Brazil) Avaí	Released	Free
28 April 2015	FW	27	(Brazil) Everaldo	(Brazil) Figueirense	Transfer	Free
6 May 2015	FW	–	(Brazil) Kléber	Free agent	Released	Free
8 May 2015	MF	7	(Uruguay) Cristian Rodríguez	(Spain) Atlético Madrid	Loan return	Free
19 May 2015	DF	18	(Argentina) Matías Rodríguez	(Italy) Sampdoria	Loan return	Free
27 June 2015	MF	6	(Brazil) Fellipe Bastos	(Brazil) Vasco da Gama	Loan return	Free
22 July 2015	DF	4	(Brazil) Rhodolfo	(Turkey) Beşiktas	Transfer	€3.000.000

=== Loans out ===
Date	Pos.	No.	Player	Moving to	Type	Fee
14 November 2014	GK	40	(Brazil) Jakson Follmann	(Brazil) Linense	Half-season loan	Free
17 November 2014	DF	–	(Brazil) Rodrigo Sabiá	(Brazil) Paulista	Half-season loan	Free
9 December 2014	DF	2	(Brazil) Pará	(Brazil) Flamengo	Season-long loan	Free
17 December 2014	MF	–	(Brazil) Mateus Magro	(Brazil) Aparecidense	Half-season loan	Free
23 December 2014	DF	15	(Brazil) Bressan	(Brazil) Flamengo	Season-long loan	Free
23 December 2014	FW	–	(Brazil) Bergson	(South Korea) Busan IPark	Season-long loan	Free
2 January 2015	DF	–	(Brazil) Douglas Grolli	(Brazil) Chapecoense	Season-long loan	Free
2 January 2015	DF	–	(Brazil) Tony	(Brazil) Bahia	Season-long loan	Free
5 January 2015	FW	77	(Brazil) Fernandinho	(Italy) Hellas Verona	Season-long loan	€1.000.000
5 January 2015	MF	–	(Brazil) Felipe Ferreira	(Brazil) Atlético Goianiense	Season-long loan	Free
5 January 2015	MF	–	(Uruguay) Maxi Rodríguez	Universidad de Chile	Half-season loan	€300.000
9 January 2015	MF	14	(Brazil) Leandro Canhoto	(Brazil) Paysandu	Season-long loan	Free
12 January 2015	DF	–	(Argentina) Robertino Canavesio	(Argentina) Gimnasia y Esgrima (M)	Half-season loan	Free
13 January 2015	DF	13	(Brazil) Moisés Dallazen	(Brazil) Santa Cruz	Season-long loan	Free
15 January 2015	FW	35	(Brazil) Marcos Paulo	(Brazil) Caxias	Season-long loan	Free
16 January 2015	DF	21	(Brazil) Breno	(Brazil) Vitória de Guimarães	Season-long loan	Free
19 January 2015	DF	5	(Brazil) Werley	(Brazil) Santos	Season-long loan	Free
20 January 2015	MF	–	(Brazil) Rondinelly	(Brazil) Grêmio Osasco Audax	Half-season loan	Free
22 January 2015	MF	–	(Brazil) Felipe Nunes	(Brazil) Capivariano	Half-season loan	Free
28 January 2015	MF	–	(Brazil) Everton Júnior	(Brazil) Boa Esporte	Season-long loan	Free
29 January 2015	MF	–	(Brazil) Émerson Santos	(Brazil) Santa Cruz	Season-long loan	Free
30 January 2015	MF	–	(Brazil) Wangler	(Brazil) Oeste	Season-long loan	Free
4 February 2015	DF	–	(Brazil) Lucas Rex	(Brazil) Internacional de Lages	Half-season loan	Free
4 February 2015	GK	–	(Brazil) Ygor Vinhas	(Brazil) Paulista	Half-season loan	Free
9 February 2015	DF	22	(Brazil) Guilherme Tinga	(Brazil) Fortaleza	Season-long loan	Free
9 February 2015	FW	–	(Brazil) Paulista	(Brazil) Novo Hamburgo	Half-season loan	Free
25 February 2015	FW	25	(Brazil) Erik Nascimento	(Brazil) Veranópolis	Half-season loan	Free
27 February 2015	MF	–	(Brazil) Jeferson Negueba	(Brazil) Nacional-PR	Half-season loan	Free
10 March 2015	FW	–	(Brazil) Paulinho	(Brazil) Londrina	Season-long loan	Free
11 March 2015	FW	28	(Brazil) Lucas Coelho	(Brazil) Goiás	Season-long loan	Free
28 April 2015	FW	25	(Brazil) Erik Nascimento	(Brazil) Juventude	Season-long loan	Free
29 April 2015	FW	–	(Brazil) Paulinho	(Brazil) Coritiba	Season-long loan	Free
5 May 2015	FW	–	(Brazil) Gustavo Xuxa	(Brazil) Londrina	Season-long loan	Free

=== Overall transfer activity ===
Spending

Transfer: €0

Loan: €0

Total: €0

Income

Transfer: €0

Loan: €0

Total: €0

Expenditure

Transfer: €0

Loan: €0

Total: €0

== Friendlies ==
=== Pre-season ===
18 January Friendly	Gramadense U-20 (Brazil)	0–2	(Brazil) Grêmio	Gramado, Brazil
16:00 UTC−02:00		Report	Everton 50'; Paulinho 52'	Stadium: Estádio dos Pinheirais; Attendance: 2,700

21 January Friendly	Grêmio (Brazil)	2–2	(Brazil) Novo Hamburgo	Gramado, Brazil
16:00 UTC−02:00	Luan 20'; Moreno 42'	Report	Silva 37' (o.g.); Warley 90+3'	Stadium: Estádio dos Pinheirais; Attendance: 2,700; Referee: Márcio Chagas da Silva

25 January Friendly	Cascavel (Brazil)	1–1	(Brazil) Grêmio	Cascavel, Brazil
17:00 UTC−02:00	Marquinhos 39'; Duda (yellow card) 73'	Report	Coelho 82'	Stadium: Olímpico Regional; Attendance: 8,678; Referee: Ricardo de Lima Regnani

== Competitions ==
=== Overall ===
Competition	Started round	Current position / round	Final position / round	First match	Last match
Campeonato Gaúcho	First stage	—	Runners-up	31 January	3 May
Campeonato Brasileiro	—	11th	—	10 May	6 December
Copa do Brasil	First round	Third round	—	1 April	—

=== Campeonato Gaúcho ===
==== Results summary ====
Overall								Home						Away					
Pld	W	D	L	GF	GA	GD	Pts	W	D	L	GF	GA	GD	W	D	L	GF	GA	GD
20	11	5	4	25	11	+14	38	6	3	2	14	5	+9	5	2	2	11	6	+5

Last updated: 3 May 2015.
Source: Soccerway

==== First stage ====
===== League table =====
Pos	Team	Pld	W	D	L	GF	GA	GD	Pts	Qualification or relegation
1	Internacional	15	10	4	1	21	8	+13	34	Advance to knockout phase
2	Grêmio	15	9	3	3	20	7	+13	30	Advance to knockout phase
3	Ypiranga-RS	15	8	2	5	21	10	+11	26	Advance to knockout phase
4	Brasil (PE)	15	7	5	3	18	9	+9	26	Advance to knockout phase
5	Lajeadense	15	6	6	3	18	12	+6	24	Advance to knockout phase

Updated to match(es) played on 6 April 2015. Source: Globo Esporte
Rules for classification: 1) Points; 2) Wins; 3) Goal difference; 4) Goals scored.

===== Results by matchday =====
Matchday	1	2	3	4	5	6	7	8	9	10	11	12	13	14	15
Ground	H	A	A	H	H	A	A	H	H	A	H	H	A	H	A
Result	W	L	W	L	L	W	D	D	W	W	W	W	W	W	D
Position	1	6	2	4	10	6	8	9	5	3	1	1	1	1	2

Updated to match(es) played on 6 April 2015. Source: Soccerway
A = Away; H = Home; W = Win; D = Draw; L = Loss

===== Matches =====
31 January 1	Grêmio	3–0	União Frederiquense	Porto Alegre
17:00 UTC−02:00	Barcos 17' (pen.) 22'; Luan (yellow card) 36'; Araújo (yellow card) 70' (yellow-red card) 77'; Everton 87'	Report		Stadium: Arena do Grêmio; Attendance: 19,873; Referee: Daniel Bins

4 February 2	Aimoré	2–1	Grêmio	São Leopoldo
22:00 UTC−02:00	Mikael 1'; Tálison (yellow card) 29'; Rennan 45'; Pitol (yellow card) 78'	Report	Bastos (yellow card) 49'; Luan (yellow card) 64'; Luan 71'	Stadium: Cristo Rei; Attendance: 2,758; Referee: Roger Goulart

8 February 3	Avenida	1–3	Grêmio	Santa Cruz do Sul
17:00 UTC−02:00	Simionato (yellow card) 14'; Altair (yellow card) 30' (yellow-red card) 44'; Paulinho (yellow card) 58'; Simionato 60'; Escobar (yellow card) 64'; Carlos Alberto (yellow card) 88'; Tinga (yellow card) 90+3'	Report	Douglas 32' (pen.); Luan (red card) 46'; Douglas (yellow card) 60'; Carlos Alberto 79' (o.g.); Oliveira (yellow card) 82'; Bastos (yellow card) 84'; Moreno 90+1'	Stadium: Estádio dos Eucaliptos; Attendance: 2,564; Referee: Diego Real

11 February 4	Grêmio	0–1	Brasil (PE)	Porto Alegre
19:30 UTC−02:00	Walace (yellow card) 21'; Paulinho (yellow card) 83'	Report	Cirilo (yellow card) 34'; Nena 49'; Wender (yellow card) 83'; Nena (yellow card) 87'; Leite (yellow card) 89'	Stadium: Arena do Grêmio; Attendance: 15,153; Referee: Daniel Bins

14 February 5	Grêmio	0–1	Veranópolis	Porto Alegre
17:00 UTC−02:00	Oliveira (yellow card) 62'; Douglas (yellow card) 69'; M. Rodríguez (yellow card) 88'	Report	Dener 21'; Amaral (yellow card) 42'; Lê (yellow card) 59'; Glauber (yellow card) 74'; Marcel (yellow card) 78'	Stadium: Arena do Grêmio; Attendance: 9,021; Referee: Daniel Soder

18 February 6	Passo Fundo	0–2	Grêmio	Passo Fundo
22:00 UTC−02:00	Klein (yellow card) 36'; José (yellow card) 45'; Xaro (yellow card) 85'; Alemão (yellow card) 87'	Report	Oliveira (yellow card) 9'; Erazo 14'; Galhardo (yellow card) 34'; Rocha 51'; Júnior (yellow card) 57'; Grohe (yellow card) 64'; M. Rodríguez (yellow card) 90+1'	Stadium: Vermelhão da Serra; Attendance: 4,786; Referee: Francisco Neto

23 February 7	Grêmio	0–0	Juventude	Porto Alegre
20:30 UTC−03:00		Report	Vacaria (yellow card) 23'; Airton (yellow card) 41'; Jardel (yellow card) 44'; Pereira (yellow card) 64'; Wallacer (yellow card) 85'	Stadium: Arena do Grêmio; Attendance: 14,672; Referee: Diego Real

1 March 8	Internacional	0–0	Grêmio	Porto Alegre
18:30 UTC−03:00	Paulão (yellow card) 39'; Cláudio Winck (yellow card) 52'; Geferson (yellow card) 67'	Report	Oliveira (yellow card) 34'; Giuliano (yellow card) 72'; Mamute (yellow card) 76'; M. Rodríguez (yellow card) 90+1'	Stadium: Beira-Rio; Attendance: 34,512; Referee: Jean Pierre Lima

7 March 9	Grêmio	3–1	Caxias	Porto Alegre
18:30 UTC−03:00	Rhodolfo (yellow card) 27'; Douglas 41'; Oliveira 73'; Mamute 83'	Report	Reinaldo (yellow card) 50'; Vanderlei 76'; André Luiz (red card) 86'	Stadium: Arena do Grêmio; Attendance: 23,055; Referee: Luís Teixeira Rocha

11 March 10	Ypiranga-RS	0–1	Grêmio	Erechim
22:00 UTC−03:00	Negretti (yellow card) 80'	Report	Mamute (yellow card) 18'; Giuliano 28'; Rhodolfo (yellow card) 41'; Bastos (yellow card) 69' (red card) 70'; B. Rodríguez (yellow card) 90'	Stadium: Colosso da Lagoa; Attendance: 8,121; Referee: Francisco Neto

14 March 11	Grêmio	1–0	Cruzeiro-RS	Porto Alegre
18:30 UTC−03:00	B. Rodríguez 83'; Ramiro (yellow card) 83'; Grohe (yellow card) 90+2'	Report	Rodrigues (yellow card) 70'; Reinaldo (yellow card) 76'	Stadium: Arena do Grêmio; Attendance: 24,894; Referee: Anderson Daronco

22 March 12	Grêmio	2–0	Lajeadense	Porto Alegre
18:30 UTC−03:00	B. Rodríguez (yellow card) 15'; Giuliano 26', 35'	Report	Machado (yellow card) 17'; Marabá (yellow card) 43'; Camilo (yellow card) 87'	Stadium: Arena do Grêmio; Attendance: 20,134; Referee: Diego Real

25 March 13	Novo Hamburgo	0–1	Grêmio	Novo Hamburgo
22:00 UTC−03:00	Magrão (yellow card) 45'; Lucena (yellow card) 70'; Dê (yellow card) 90+3'	Report	Ramiro 33'; Geromel (yellow card) 41'; Tiago (yellow card) 62'; Douglas (yellow card) 90+4'	Stadium: Estádio do Vale; Attendance: 1,572; Referee: Daniel Bins

29 March 14	Grêmio	2–0	São Paulo-RS	Porto Alegre
18:30 UTC−03:00	Maicon (yellow card) 53'; Luan 68', 70'; Maicon (yellow card) 73'	Report	Massari (yellow card) 30'; Möller (yellow card) 45'; Balduíno (yellow card) 51'	Stadium: Arena do Grêmio; Attendance: 16,055; Referee: Luís Teixeira Rocha

5 April 15	São José-RS	1–1	Grêmio	São Leopoldo
16:00 UTC−03:00	Carrilho 59'; Carrilho (yellow card) 60'	Report	Bastos 11'	Stadium: Cristo Rei; Attendance: 752; Referee: Jean Pierre Lima

==== Knockout phase ====
===== Quarter-finals =====
9 April Single leg	Grêmio	1–1 (6–5 p)	Novo Hamburgo	Porto Alegre
19:30 UTC−03:00	Geromel 70'; Everton (yellow card) 77'; Douglas (yellow card) 88'	Report	Beto (yellow card) 22'; Fred 29'; Lucena (yellow card) 59' (yellow-red card) 77'; Bolívar (yellow card) 69'; Schuster (yellow card) 74'	Stadium: Arena do Grêmio; Attendance: 16,991; Referee: Anderson Daronco
	Penalties
	Maicon (penalty scored); Bastos (penalty scored); Luan (penalty scored); Everton (penalty missed); Douglas (penalty scored); Oliveira (penalty scored); Ramiro (penalty scored)		Magrão (penalty scored); Fred (penalty scored); Humberto (penalty scored); Luís Mario (penalty scored); Paulinho (penalty missed); Dê (penalty scored); Schuster (penalty missed)

===== Semi-finals =====
12 April 1st leg	Juventude	0–1	Grêmio	Caxias do Sul
16:00 UTC−03:00	Pereira (yellow card) 37'; Diogo (yellow card) 74'; Vacaria (yellow card) 78'; Schons (yellow card) 89'; Héverton (yellow card) 90+2'	Report	Giuliano 20'; Douglas (yellow card) 31'; M. Rodríguez (yellow card) 80'; Grohe (yellow card) 84'	Stadium: Alfredo Jaconi; Attendance: 8,192; Referee: Daniel Bins

18 April 2nd leg	Grêmio	2–1 (3–1 agg.)	Juventude	Porto Alegre
16:00 UTC−03:00	Luan 29'; Geromel 76'	Report	Schons (yellow card) 27'; Douglas 45+1'	Stadium: Arena do Grêmio; Attendance: 32,855; Referee: Jean Pierre Lima

===== Finals =====
26 April 1st leg	Grêmio	0–0	Internacional	Porto Alegre
16:00 UTC−03:00	Maicon (yellow card) 14'; Geromel (yellow card) 40' (yellow-red card) 63'; B. Rodríguez (yellow card) 41'; Grohe (yellow card) 90+4'	Report	Freitas (yellow card) 27'; Aránguiz (yellow card) 34'; Alisson (yellow card) 41'; William (yellow card) 53'; Valdívia (yellow card) 61'; Geferson (yellow card) 84'	Stadium: Arena do Grêmio; Attendance: 46,909; Referee: Anderson Daronco

3 May 2nd leg	Internacional	2–1 (2–1 agg.)	Grêmio	Porto Alegre
16:00 UTC−03:00	Nilmar 7'; Valdívia 19'; Aránguiz (yellow card) 42'; Ernando (yellow card) 70'; Valdívia (yellow card) 71'	Report	Bastos (yellow card) 5'; Giuliano 45+3'; Oliveira (yellow card) 67'; Walace (yellow card) 70'; Rhodolfo (red card) 89'	Stadium: Beira-Rio; Attendance: 41,191; Referee: Leandro Vuaden

=== Campeonato Brasileiro ===
==== League table ====
Pos	Team	Pld	W	D	L	GF	GA	GD	Pts	Qualification or relegation
1	Corinthians (C)	38	24	9	5	71	31	+40	81	2016 Copa Libertadores second stage (Note: Palmeiras has a berth guaranteed to the second stage as the 2015 Copa do Brasil champions.)
2	Atlético Mineiro	38	21	6	11	65	47	+18	69	2016 Copa Libertadores second stage
3	Grêmio	38	20	8	10	52	32	+20	68	2016 Copa Libertadores second stage
4	São Paulo	38	18	8	12	53	47	+6	62	2016 Copa Libertadores first stage
5	Internacional	38	17	9	12	39	38	+1	60	2016 Copa do Brasil round of 16 (Note: Since a Brazilian team didn't win the 2015 Copa Libertadores, an additional berth to the 2016 Copa do Brasil round of 16 will be given to the best team not qualified to the 2016 Copa Libertadores, the fifth-placed Internacional.)

Source: Soccerway.com
Rules for classification: 1) points; 2) wins; 3) goal difference; 4) goals scored; 5) head-to-head results; 6) least red cards received; 7) least yellow cards received; 8) draw.
(C) Champions

==== Results summary ====
Overall								Home						Away					
Pld	W	D	L	GF	GA	GD	Pts	W	D	L	GF	GA	GD	W	D	L	GF	GA	GD
3	1	1	1	4	5	−1	4	1	1	0	4	3	+1	0	0	1	0	2	−2

Last updated: 24 May 2015.
Source: Soccerway

==== Results by matchday ====
Matchday	1	2	3	4	5	6	7	8	9	10	11	12	13	14	15	16	17	18	19	20	21	22	23	24	25	26	27	28	29	30	31	32	33	34	35	36	37	38
Ground	H	A	H	A	H	A	H	H	A	H	A	A	H	A	H	A	H	A	H	A	H	A	H	A	H	A	A	H	A	H	H	A	H	A	H	A	H	A
Result	D	L	W																																			
Position	7	18	8																																			

Updated to match(es) played on 16 May 2015. Source: Soccerway
A = Away; H = Home; W = Win; D = Draw; L = Loss

==== Matches ====
10 May 1	Grêmio	3–3	Ponte Preta	Porto Alegre
11:00 UTC−03:00	Mamute 25', 54', (yellow card) 55'; Galhardo (yellow card) 30'; Walace (yellow card) 67'; M. Rodríguez 78'	Report	Biro Biro (yellow card) 9'; Rildo (yellow card) 29', (goal) 64'; Alves (yellow card) 49' (yellow-red card) 89'; Cajá 62', (yellow card) 72'; Josimar (yellow card) 69'; Oliveira 90+4'	Stadium: Arena do Grêmio; Attendance: 13,164; Referee: Héber Lopes

16 May 2	Coritiba	2–0	Grêmio	Curitiba
18:30 UTC−03:00	Ruy (yellow card) 6'; Galhardo 27'; Erazo 34' (o.g.); Norberto (yellow card) 45+2'	Report	Oliveira (yellow card) 17'; Maicon (yellow card) 51'; Geromel (yellow card) 58'	Stadium: Couto Pereira; Attendance: 13,715; Referee: Ricardo Ribeiro

23 May 3	Grêmio	1–0	Figueirense	Porto Alegre
21:00 UTC−03:00	Galhardo (yellow card) 20'; Walace (yellow card) 40'; Douglas (yellow card) 55'; Tiago (yellow card) 63'; Rodríguez 78', (yellow card) 89'; Grohe (yellow card) 90+1'	Report	Yago (yellow card) 32'; Cereceda (yellow card) 52'; Fabinho (yellow card) 57'; Alves (yellow card) 72'; Silva (yellow card) 90+2'	Stadium: Arena do Grêmio; Attendance: 9,743; Referee: Luiz Flávio de Oliveira

31 May 4	Goiás	v	Grêmio	Goiânia
16:00 UTC−03:00		Report		Stadium: Serra Dourada

3 June 5	Grêmio	v	Corinthians	Porto Alegre
22:00 UTC−03:00		Report		Stadium: Arena do Grêmio

=== Copa do Brasil ===
==== Matches ====
===== First round =====
1 April 1st leg	Campinense	1–2	Grêmio	Campina Grande
22:00 UTC−03:00	Alves 65' (pen.)	Report	Douglas 50'; M. Rodríguez (yellow card) 64'; Luan 68'; Walace (yellow card) 88'	Stadium: Amigão; Attendance: 4,147; Referee: Avelar Rodrigo da Silva

15 April 2nd leg	Grêmio	2–0 (4–1 agg.)	Campinense	Porto Alegre
22:00 UTC−03:00	Bastos (yellow card) 37'; Maicon (yellow card) 45'; Douglas 64'; Walace (yellow card) 80'; Lincoln 90+3'; Lincoln (yellow card) 90+4'	Report	Negretti (yellow card) 39'; Jairo (yellow card) 75'; Leandro (yellow card) 79'	Stadium: Arena do Grêmio; Attendance: 10,667; Referee: Wagner Reway

===== Second round =====
13 May 1st leg	CRB	1–3	Grêmio	Maceió
19:30 UTC−03:00	Zé Carlos (yellow card) 20'; Marques (yellow card) 39'; Emaxwell (yellow card) 68'; Emaxwell 71'	Report	Luan 12'; Rocha 36', 43'; Rocha (yellow card) 54'; M. Rodríguez (yellow card) 56'; Grohe (yellow card) 76'	Stadium: Rei Pelé; Attendance: 8,074; Referee: Marielson Silva

19 May 2nd leg	Grêmio	v	CRB	Porto Alegre
19:30 UTC−03:00		Report		Stadium: Arena do Grêmio
Note: Grêmio has qualified automatically by winning the first leg by two goals of difference.

===== Third round =====
July 1st leg	Grêmio	v	Criciúma	Porto Alegre
UTC−03:00		Report		Stadium: Arena do Grêmio

July 2nd leg	Criciúma	v	Grêmio	Criciúma
UTC−03:00		Report		Stadium: Heriberto Hülse

== Statistics ==
=== Appearances and goals ===
No.	Pos	Nat	Player	Total		Série A		Copa do Brasil		Gaúcho	
No.	Pos	Nat	Player	Apps	Goals	Apps	Goals	Apps	Goals	Apps	Goals
Goalkeepers
1	GK	(Brazil) BRA	Marcelo Grohe	22	0	3	0	3	0	16	0
12	GK	(Brazil) BRA	Tiago Machowski	4	0	0	0	0	0	4	0
20	GK	(Brazil) BRA	Leonardo	0	0	0	0	0	0	0	0
30	GK	(Brazil) BRA	Bruno Grassi	0	0	0	0	0	0	0	0
Defenders
2	DF	(Brazil) BRA	Rafael Galhardo	12	0	2	0	0	0	8+2	0
3	DF	(Brazil) BRA	Pedro Geromel	12	2	2	0	3	0	7	2
4	DF	(Brazil) BRA	Bressan (footballer)	0	0	0	0	0	0	0	0
14	DF	(Brazil) BRA	Júnior Tavares	10	0	1	0	1	0	6+2	0
18	DF	(Brazil) BRA	Lucas Ramon	0	0	0	0	0	0	0	0
21	DF	(Brazil) BRA	Gabriel Silva	0	0	0	0	0	0	0	0
22	DF	(Brazil) BRA	Marcelo Hermes	5	0	0	0	0	0	5	0
26	DF	(Brazil) BRA	Marcelo Oliveira	24	1	3	0	3	0	18	1
31	DF	(Brazil) BRA	Rafael Thyere	0	0	0	0	0	0	0	0
33	DF	(Ecuador) ECU	Frickson Erazo	15	1	2	0	0	0	12+1	1
34	DF	(Brazil) BRA	Raul Cardoso	0	0	0	0	0	0	0	0
—	DF	(Brazil) BRA	Gabriel Blos	0	0	0	0	0	0	0	0
Midfielders
5	MF	(Brazil) BRA	Walace	14	0	3	0	1+2	0	3+5	0
8	MF	(Brazil) BRA	Giuliano	20	5	3	0	3	0	12+2	5
10	MF	(Brazil) BRA	Douglas	23	4	1+1	0	2+1	2	18	2
15	MF	(Brazil) BRA	Edinho	0	0	0	0	0	0	0	0
16	MF	(Brazil) BRA	Araújo	7	0	0	0	0	0	4+3	0
17	MF	(Brazil) BRA	Ramiro	8	1	0	0	1	0	5+2	1
19	MF	(Brazil) BRA	Maicon	15	0	3	0	3	0	9	0
24	MF	(Brazil) BRA	Matheus Biteco	0	0	0	0	0	0	0	0
25	MF	(Brazil) BRA	William Schuster	0	0	0	0	0	0	0	0
27	MF	(Brazil) BRA	Lincoln	9	1	1	0	0+1	1	4+3	0
28	MF	(Uruguay) URU	Maxi Rodríguez	0	0	0	0	0	0	0	0
35	MF	(Brazil) BRA	Arthur	1	0	0	0	0	0	1	0
36	MF	(Brazil) BRA	Ânderson Balbino	1	0	0	0	0	0	0+1	0
37	MF	(Brazil) BRA	Moisés Wolschick	0	0	0	0	0	0	0	0
Forwards
7	FW	(Brazil) BRA	Luan	21	7	3	0	3	2	14+1	5
9	FW	(Uruguay) URU	Braian Rodríguez	13	2	0+1	1	2	0	9+1	1
11	FW	(Brazil) BRA	Yuri Mamute	16	3	1+2	2	0+2	0	5+6	1
13	FW	(Brazil) BRA	Bobô	0	0	0	0	0	0	0	0
23	FW	(Brazil) BRA	Everton	16	1	0+2	0	0+2	0	3+9	1
29	FW	(Brazil) BRA	Vitinho	0	0	0	0	0	0	0	0
32	FW	(Brazil) BRA	Pedro Rocha	7	3	2	0	1	2	2+2	1
77	FW	(Brazil) BRA	Fernandinho	0	0	0	0	0	0	0	0
Players who currently don't integrate the squad
4	DF	(Brazil) BRA	Rhodolfo	24	0	2	0	3	0	19	0
6	MF	(Brazil) BRA	Fellipe Bastos	22	1	0+2	0	1+1	0	15+3	1
7	MF	(Uruguay) URU	Cristian Rodríguez	2	0	0	0	0	0	1+1	0
9	FW	(Argentina) ARG	Hernán Barcos	1	2	0	0	0	0	1	2
18	DF	(Argentina) ARG	Matías Rodríguez	20	1	1+1	1	3	0	11+4	0
28	FW	(Brazil) BRA	Lucas Coelho	4	0	0	0	0	0	2+2	0
40	GK	(Brazil) BRA	Vitor Monteiro	0	0	0	0	0	0	0	0
—	FW	(Brazil) BRA	Everaldo	6	0	0	0	0	0	3+3	0
—	FW	(Bolivia) BOL	Marcelo Moreno	4	1	0	0	0	0	3+1	1
—	FW	(Brazil) BRA	Paulinho	1	0	0	0	0	0	0+1	0

Last updated: 24 May 2015.
Source: Match reports in Competitions.

=== Goalscorers ===
The list include all goals in competitive matches.

No.	Pos	Nat	Player	Campeonato Brasileiro	Copa do Brasil	Campeonato Gaúcho	Total
1	FW	(Brazil)	Luan	0	2	4	6
2	MF	(Brazil)	Giuliano	0	0	5	5
3	MF	(Brazil)	Douglas	0	2	2	4
4	FW	(Brazil)	Yuri Mamute	2	0	1	3
4	FW	(Brazil)	Pedro Rocha	0	2	1	3
6	FW	(Argentina)	Braian Rodríguez	1	0	1	2
6	DF	(Brazil)	Pedro Geromel	0	0	2	2
8	MF	(Brazil)	Lincoln	0	1	0	1
8	FW	(Brazil)	Everton	0	0	1	1
8	MF	(Brazil)	Fellipe Bastos	0	0	1	1
8	MF	(Brazil)	Ramiro	0	0	1	1
8	DF	(Ecuador)	Frickson Erazo	0	0	1	1
8	DF	(Brazil)	Marcelo Oliveira	0	0	1	1
Players who do not integrate over the First team squad
6	FW	(Argentina)	Hernán Barcos	0	0	2	2
8	FW	(Bolivia)	Marcelo Moreno	0	0	1	1
8	DF	(Argentina)	Matías Rodríguez	1	0	0	1
Own goals				0	0	1	1
Total				4	7	25	36

As of 24 May 2015.
Source: Match reports in Competitions

=== Clean sheets ===
No.	Pos	Nat	Player	Campeonato Brasileiro	Copa do Brasil	Campeonato Gaúcho	Total
1	GK	(Brazil)	Marcelo Grohe	1	1	8	10
2	GK	(Brazil)	Tiago Machowski	0	0	3	3
Total				1	1	11	13

As of 24 May 2015.
Source: Match reports in Competitions

=== Overview ===
Games played	26 (3 Campeonato Brasileiro, 3 Copa do Brasil, 20 Campeonato Gaúcho)
Games won	15 (1 Campeonato Brasileiro, 3 Copa do Brasil, 11 Campeonato Gaúcho)
Games drawn	6 (1 Campeonato Brasileiro, 5 Campeonato Gaúcho)
Games lost	5 (1 Campeonato Brasileiro, 4 Campeonato Gaúcho)
Goals scored	36
Goals conceded	18
Goal difference	+18
Clean sheets	13
Best result	3–0 (H) v União Frederiquense – Campeonato Gaúcho – 31 January
Worst result	2–0 (A) v Coritiba – Campeonato Brasileiro – 16 May
Top scorer	Luan (6)

Updated to match played 24 May 2015.
Source: Competitions

=== Home attendances ===
Below listed are the top ten home attendances of Grêmio in matches at this season.

Pos.	Competition	Round / Matchday	Date	Score	Opponent	Attendance
1	Campeonato Gaúcho	Finals	26 April	0–0	Internacional	46,909
2	Campeonato Gaúcho	Semi-finals	18 April	2–1	Juventude	32,855
3	Campeonato Gaúcho	First stage	14 March	1–0	Cruzeiro-RS	24,894
4	Campeonato Gaúcho	First stage	7 March	3–1	Caxias	23,055
5	Campeonato Gaúcho	First stage	22 March	2–0	Lajeadense	20,134
6	Campeonato Gaúcho	First stage	31 January	2–0	União Frederiquense	19,873
7	Campeonato Gaúcho	Quarter-finals	9 April	1–1	Novo Hamburgo	16,991
8	Campeonato Gaúcho	First stage	29 March	2–0	São Paulo-RS	16,055
9	Campeonato Gaúcho	First stage	11 February	0–1	Brasil (PE)	15,153
10	Campeonato Gaúcho	First stage	23 February	0–0	Juventude	14,672

Source: Match reports in Competitions

Correct as of match played 10 May 2015.
