= 2015 Campeonato Gaúcho =

Campeonato Gaúcho
- Season: 2015
- Champions: Internacional
- Relegated: Caxias; União Frederiquense; Avenida
- Série D: Ypiranga-RS
- Copa do Brasil: Internacional; Grêmio; Brasil (PE)
- Matches: 131
- Top goalscorer: Michel (Passo Fundo); 11 goals
- Best goalkeeper: Carlão (Ypiranga-RS); 9 clean sheets
- Biggest home win: Juventude 6–1 Aimoré (5 April)
- Biggest away win: São Paulo 0–3 Juventude (11 February)
- Highest scoring: Internacional 4–4 São José-RS (4 February)
- Longest winning run: 7 games Internacional
- Longest unbeaten run: 14 games Grêmio
- Longest winless run: 9 games União Frederiquense
- Longest losing run: 4 games Caxias; Passo Fundo
- Highest attendance: 46,909; Grêmio 0–0 Internacional (26 April)
- Lowest attendance: 109; São José-RS 2–2 Cruzeiro-RS (26 March)

The 2015 Campeonato da Primeira Divisão de Futebol Profissional da FGF (2015 FGF First Division Professional Football Championship), better known as the 2015 Campeonato Gaúcho or Gaúcho, was the 95th edition of the top flight football league of the Brazilian state of Rio Grande do Sul. The season began on 31 January and ended on 3 May, with the second leg of final. The 16 clubs contested in the Campeonato Gaúcho (Championship A1 Series). Internacional successfully defended its 2014 title.

In the 2015 season finals, the two top ranked clubs in the state league (Grêmio and Internacional) qualified, reissuing the Grenal in the championship decision after both clubs narrowly escaped elimination in the quarterfinals. In the opening match of the finals, the game ended in a 0–0 draw at Arena do Grêmio. Along with the two finalists, Brasil also qualified for the next season Copa do Brasil. Ypiranga-RS qualified for the Campeonato Brasileiro Série D at this season, for being the best placed team without national division. Meanwhile, Caxias, União Frederiquense and Avenida were the three bottom ranked teams and were relegated for the 2016 season to the Campeonato Gaúcho Série A2.

Michel easily won the scoring title with 11 goals Passo Fundo failed to qualify for the knockout phase. The goalkeeper Carlão, of Ypiranga-RS, led the championship with 9 clean sheets, while Marcelo Grohe, of Grêmio, finished with 8.

== Format ==
The sixteen participating clubs plays each other in a single round. The top eight teams qualified to the play-offs. The bottom three teams in the overall standings were relegated.

== Clubs ==
The following 16 clubs contested in the 2015 Campeonato Gaúcho.

| Club | City | Stadium | Capacity | Pos. in 2014 | 1st season | Seasons | Titles | Last title |
|---|---|---|---|---|---|---|---|---|
| Aimoré | São Leopoldo | Cristo Rei | 10,000 | 11th | 1961 | 6 | — | — |
| Avenida | Santa Cruz do Sul | Estádio dos Eucaliptos | 3,600 | 2nd (Série A2) | 1971 | 10 | — | — |
| Brasil (PE) | Pelotas | Bento Freitas | 18,000 | 3rd | 1919 | 16 | 1 | 1919 |
| Caxias | Caxias do Sul | Centenário | 30,802 | 4th | 1961 | 54 | 1 | 2000 |
| Cruzeiro-RS | Cachoeirinha | Antônio Vieira Ramos | 8,000 | 8th | 1929 | 20 | 1 | 1929 |
| Grêmio | Porto Alegre | Arena do Grêmio | 55,662 | 2nd | 1919 | 73 | 36 | 2010 |
| Internacional | Porto Alegre | Beira-Rio | 50,128 | 1st | 1927 | 71 | 43 | 2014 |
| Juventude | Caxias do Sul | Alfredo Jaconi | 23,726 | 7th | 1925 | 57 | 1 | 1998 |
| Lajeadense | Lajeado | Arena Alviazul | 7,000 | 12th | 1975 | 18 | — | — |
| Novo Hamburgo | Novo Hamburgo | Estádio do Vale | 6,500 | 6th | 1930 | 62 | — | — |
| Passo Fundo | Passo Fundo | Vermelhão da Serra | 20,000 | 13th | 1987 | 23 | — | — |
| São José-RS | Porto Alegre | Passo D'Areia | 8,000 | 10th | 1961 | 31 | — | — |
| São Paulo-RS | Rio Grande | Aldo Dapuzzo | 11,500 | 9th | 1933 | 28 | 1 | 1933 |
| União Frederiquense | Frederico Westphalen | Vermelhão da Colina | 4,000 | 3rd (Série A2) | 2015 | 1 | — | — |
| Veranópolis | Veranópolis | Antônio David Farina | 4,000 | 5th | 1994 | 22 | — | — |
| Ypiranga-RS | Erechim | Colosso da Lagoa | 30,000 | 1st (Série A2) | 1968 | 25 | — | — |

== First stage ==
=== Standings ===
| Pos | Team | Pld | W | D | L | GF | GA | GD | Pts | Qualification or relegation |
|---|---|---|---|---|---|---|---|---|---|---|
| 1 | Internacional | 15 | 10 | 4 | 1 | 21 | 8 | +13 | 34 | Advance to knockout phase |
| 2 | Grêmio | 15 | 9 | 3 | 3 | 20 | 7 | +13 | 30 | Advance to knockout phase |
| 3 | Ypiranga-RS | 15 | 8 | 2 | 5 | 21 | 10 | +11 | 26 | Advance to knockout phase |
| 4 | Brasil (PE) | 15 | 7 | 5 | 3 | 18 | 9 | +9 | 26 | Advance to knockout phase |
| 5 | Lajeadense | 15 | 6 | 6 | 3 | 18 | 12 | +6 | 24 | Advance to knockout phase |
| 6 | Juventude | 15 | 6 | 5 | 4 | 18 | 10 | +8 | 23 | Advance to knockout phase |
| 7 | Novo Hamburgo | 15 | 6 | 3 | 6 | 13 | 14 | −1 | 21 | Advance to knockout phase |
| 8 | Cruzeiro-RS | 15 | 5 | 6 | 4 | 13 | 13 | 0 | 21 | Advance to knockout phase |
| 9 | Passo Fundo | 15 | 5 | 5 | 5 | 18 | 21 | −3 | 20 | |
| 10 | Veranópolis | 15 | 5 | 3 | 7 | 10 | 12 | −2 | 18 | |
| 11 | São José-RS | 15 | 4 | 6 | 5 | 17 | 18 | −1 | 18 | |
| 12 | Aimoré | 15 | 4 | 6 | 5 | 16 | 24 | −8 | 18 | |
| 13 | São Paulo-RS | 15 | 3 | 5 | 7 | 12 | 19 | −7 | 14 | |
| 14 | Caxias | 15 | 3 | 3 | 9 | 10 | 18 | −8 | 12 | 2016 Campeonato Gaúcho Série A2 |
| 15 | União Frederiquense | 15 | 1 | 7 | 7 | 10 | 24 | −14 | 10 | 2016 Campeonato Gaúcho Série A2 |
| 16 | Avenida | 15 | 2 | 3 | 10 | 9 | 25 | −16 | 9 | 2016 Campeonato Gaúcho Série A2 |

Updated to match(es) played on 6 April 2015. Source: Globo Esporte
Rules for classification: 1) Points; 2) Wins; 3) Goal difference; 4) Goals scored.

== Knockout phase ==
=== Quarter-finals ===
==== Standings ====
| Team 1 | Score | Team 2 |
|---|---|---|
| Internacional | 2–2 (3–1 p) | Cruzeiro-RS |
| Brasil (PE) | 2–1 | Lajeadense |
| Grêmio | 1–1 (6–5 p) | Novo Hamburgo |
| Ypiranga-RS | 0–2 | Juventude |

==== Matches ====
| 8 April Single leg | Brasil (PE) | 2–1 | Lajeadense | Rio Grande |
| 21:00 UTC-03:00 | Oliveira 31'; Wender 70' | Report | Gilmar 45+1' (pen.) | Stadium: Aldo Dapuzzo; Attendance: 4,960; Referee: Leandro Vuaden |

| 8 April Single leg | Internacional | 2–2 (3–1 p) | Cruzeiro-RS | Porto Alegre |
| 22:00 UTC-03:00 | López 77', 81' (pen.) | Report | Matheus 40'; Wesley 50' | Stadium: Beira-Rio; Attendance: 9,396; Referee: Diego Real |
| | Penalties |
| | D'Alessandro (penalty scored); López (penalty scored); Juan (penalty scored); Moura (penalty missed) | | Laerte (penalty missed); Heffner (penalty missed); Jefferson (penalty scored); Benhur (penalty missed) |

| 9 April Single leg | Grêmio | 1–1 (6–5 p) | Novo Hamburgo | Porto Alegre |
| 19:30 UTC-03:00 | Geromel 70' | Report | Fred 29' | Stadium: Arena do Grêmio; Attendance: 16,991; Referee: Anderson Daronco |
| | Penalties |
| | Maicon (penalty scored); Bastos (penalty scored); Luan (penalty scored); Everton (penalty missed); Douglas (penalty scored); Oliveira (penalty scored); Ramiro (penalty scored) | | Magrão (penalty scored); Fred (penalty scored); Humberto (penalty scored); Luís Mario (penalty scored); Paulinho (penalty missed); Dê (penalty scored); Schuster (penalty missed) |

| 9 April Single leg | Ypiranga-RS | 0–2 | Juventude | Erechim |
| 19:30 UTC-03:00 | | Report | Wallacer 11', 56' | Stadium: Colosso da Lagoa; Attendance: 3,127; Referee: Jean Pierre Lima |

=== Semi-finals ===
==== Standings ====
| Team 1 | Agg. | Team 2 | 1st leg | 2nd leg |
|---|---|---|---|---|
| Internacional | 4–2 | Brasil (PE) | 1–1 | 3–1 |
| Grêmio | 3–1 | Juventude | 1–0 | 2–1 |

==== Matches ====
| 11 April 1st leg | Brasil (PE) | 1–1 | Internacional | Rio Grande |
| 16:00 UTC-03:00 | Forster 81' (pen.) | Report | Moura 45+3' | Stadium: Aldo Dapuzzo; Attendance: 6,503; Referee: Anderson Daronco |

| 12 April 1st leg | Juventude | 0–1 | Grêmio | Caxias do Sul |
| 16:00 UTC-03:00 | | Report | Giuliano 20' | Stadium: Alfredo Jaconi; Attendance: 8,192; Referee: Daniel Bins |

| 18 April 2nd leg | Grêmio | 2–1 (3–1 agg.) | Juventude | Porto Alegre |
| 16:00 UTC-03:00 | Luan 29'; Geromel 76' | Report | Douglas 45+1' | Stadium: Arena do Grêmio; Attendance: 32,855; Referee: Jean Pierre Lima |

| 18 April 2nd leg | Internacional | 3–1 (4–2 agg.) | Brasil (PE) | Porto Alegre |
| 16:00 UTC-03:00 | Alex 56'; Valdívia 61'; Moura 80' | Report | Márcio Jonatan 86' | Stadium: Beira-Rio; Attendance: 27,395; Referee: Luís Teixeira Rocha |

=== Finals ===
==== Standings ====
| Team 1 | Agg. | Team 2 | 1st leg | 2nd leg |
|---|---|---|---|---|
| Internacional | 2–1 | Grêmio | 0–0 | 2–1 |

==== Matches ====
| 26 April 1st leg | Grêmio | 0–0 | Internacional | Porto Alegre |
| 16:00 UTC-03:00 | | Report | | Stadium: Arena do Grêmio; Attendance: 46,909; Referee: Anderson Daronco |

| 3 May 2nd leg | Internacional | 2–1 (2–1 agg.) | Grêmio | Porto Alegre |
| 16:00 UTC-03:00 | | Report | | Stadium: Beira-Rio |

== Overall table ==
Unlike 2014, the overall table considers the matches played during all stages and the first criterion for the position is stage. In order to reduce the number of participants from 16 to 12 (14 in 2016) three teams that would be relegated to play Série A2 in 2016 and only one team would be promoted to the first division. The best placed team not playing in Campeonato Brasileiro Série A (Grêmio and Internacional), Série B or Série C (Brasil (PE), Caxias and Juventude) and the 2014 Super Copa Gaúcha champions Lajeadense will be "promoted" to Série D. The best three teams will qualify for 2016 Copa do Brasil.

| Pos | Team | Pld | W | D | L | GF | GA | GD | Pts | Qualification or relegation |
|---|---|---|---|---|---|---|---|---|---|---|
| 1 | Internacional | 20 | 12 | 7 | 1 | 29 | 13 | +16 | 43 | 2016 Copa do Brasil |
| 2 | Grêmio | 20 | 11 | 5 | 4 | 25 | 11 | +14 | 38 | 2016 Copa do Brasil |
| 3 | Brasil (PE) | 18 | 7 | 7 | 4 | 22 | 14 | +8 | 28 | 2016 Copa do Brasil |
| 4 | Juventude | 18 | 7 | 5 | 6 | 21 | 13 | +8 | 26 | |
| 5 | Ypiranga-RS | 16 | 8 | 2 | 6 | 21 | 12 | +9 | 26 | 2015 Campeonato Brasileiro Série D |
| 6 | Lajeadense | 16 | 6 | 6 | 4 | 19 | 14 | +5 | 24 | |
| 7 | Novo Hamburgo | 16 | 6 | 4 | 6 | 14 | 15 | −1 | 22 | |
| 8 | Cruzeiro-RS | 16 | 5 | 7 | 4 | 15 | 15 | 0 | 22 | |
| 9 | Passo Fundo | 15 | 5 | 5 | 5 | 18 | 21 | −3 | 20 | |
| 10 | Veranópolis | 15 | 5 | 3 | 7 | 10 | 12 | −2 | 18 | |
| 11 | São José-RS | 15 | 4 | 6 | 5 | 17 | 18 | −1 | 18 | |
| 12 | Aimoré | 15 | 4 | 6 | 5 | 16 | 24 | −8 | 18 | |
| 13 | São Paulo-RS | 15 | 3 | 5 | 7 | 12 | 19 | −7 | 14 | |
| 14 | Caxias | 15 | 3 | 3 | 9 | 10 | 18 | −8 | 12 | 2016 Campeonato Gaúcho Série A2 |
| 15 | União Frederiquense | 15 | 1 | 7 | 7 | 10 | 24 | −14 | 10 | 2016 Campeonato Gaúcho Série A2 |
| 16 | Avenida | 15 | 2 | 3 | 10 | 9 | 25 | −16 | 9 | 2016 Campeonato Gaúcho Série A2 |

Updated to match(es) played on 3 May 2015. Source: Globo Esporte
Rules for classification: 1) Stage; 2) Points; 3) Wins; 4) Goal difference; 5) Goals scored.

== Records and statistics ==
=== Goalscorers ===
This is the list of goalscorers in the 2015 Campeonato Gaúcho. Players and teams in bold are still active in the competition.

| Rank | Player | Club | Goals |
|---|---|---|---|
| 1 | (Brazil) Michel | Passo Fundo | 11 |
| 2 | (Equatorial Guinea) Nena | Brasil (PE) | 6 |
| 2 | (Brazil) Ramon Machado | Lajeadense | 6 |
| 2 | (Brazil) Paulo Baier | Ypiranga-RS | 6 |
| 5 | (Brazil) Wesley | Cruzeiro-RS | 5 |
| 5 | (Brazil) **Alex** | **Internacional** | 5 |
| 5 | (Brazil) **Valdívia** | **Internacional** | 5 |
| 5 | (Brazil) Wallacer | Juventude | 5 |
| 5 | (Brazil) Leandrão | Novo Hamburgo | 5 |
| 10 | (Brazil) Paulinho Simionato | Avenida | 4 |
| 10 | (Brazil) Diogo Oliveira | Brasil (PE) | 4 |
| 10 | (Brazil) **Giuliano** | **Grêmio** | 4 |
| 10 | (Brazil) **Luan** | **Grêmio** | 4 |
| 10 | (Brazil) Rafinha | São José-RS | 4 |
