= Paulinho Moccelin =

Brazilian footballer

Personal information
- Full name: Paulo Roberto Moccelin
- Date of birth: 16 March 1994 (age 32)
- Place of birth: Guaporé, Brazil
- Height: 1.68 m (5 ft 6 in)
- Position: Winger

Team information
- Current team: Londrina
- Number: 18

Youth career
- 2012: Juventude
- 2013: Grêmio

Senior career*
Years	Team	Apps	(Gls)
2013–2016	Grêmio	15	(2)
2014	→ Fortaleza (loan)	5	(1)
2014	→ Londrina (loan)	9	(2)
2015	→ Londrina (loan)	7	(1)
2015	→ Coritiba (loan)	10	(1)
2016	→ Londrina (loan)	30	(0)
2016	→ Cuiabá (loan)	5	(0)
2017	Atlético Tubarão	11	(1)
2017	São José-RS	3	(0)
2018	Maringá	20	(0)
2018–2024	Londrina	75	(9)
2019	→ Novorizontino (loan)	7	(0)
2020–2021	→ Chapecoense (loan)	41	(7)
2021	→ Sport (loan)	34	(3)
2022	→ São Bernardo (loan)	12	(1)
2022	→ Juventude (loan)	9	(0)
2022	→ CRB (loan)	13	(0)
2023	→ ABC (loan)	7	(1)
2024–2025	Brusque	58	(2)
2025	Arema	12	(0)
2026–	Londrina	10	(1)
- * Club domestic league appearances and goals as of 28 February 2026

Paulo Roberto Moccelin (born 16 March 1994), commonly known as Paulinho, is a Brazilian professional footballer who plays as a winger for Brazilian club Londrina.

== Career ==
He began his career in the Juventude's Academy, which in 2012 turned professional player. However, he played little in the club, because in the beginning of 2013 was transferred for Grêmio in a package of signings who still had Alex Telles, Bressan, Ramiro and Follmann.

Because of low use in his new club, Paulinho Moccelin was loaned to Fortaleza in March 2014, in the meantime, was not well at the club and was eventually returned to Grêmio two months later. In June of the same year, Paulinho was again loaned, this time to Londrina, which has the function of helping the club of Campeonato Brasileiro Série D to higher division.

On 26 June 2025, Paulinho Moccelin officially signed for Indonesian club Arema.

== Career statistics ==
As of 7 April 2021.

Club	Season	League			State League		National Cup		Continental		Other		Total	
Club	Season	Division	Apps	Goals	Apps	Goals	Apps	Goals	Apps	Goals	Apps	Goals	Apps	Goals
Grêmio	2013	Série A	9	1	3	1	2	0	0	0	—		14	2
Grêmio	2014	Série A	0	0	2	0	0	0	0	0	—		2	0
Grêmio	2015	Série A	0	0	1	0	0	0	0	0	—		1	0
Grêmio	Total		9	1	6	1	2	0	0	0	—		17	2
Fortaleza (loan)	2014	Série C	0	0	5	1	0	0	0	0	—		5	1
Londrina (loan)	2014	Série D	9	2	—		2	0	—		—		11	2
Londrina (loan)	2015	Série C	0	0	7	1	2	0	—		—		9	1
Coritiba (loan)	2015	Série A	10	1	—		—		—		—		10	1
Londrina (loan)	2016	Série B	16	0	13	0	2	0	—		—		31	0
Cuiabá (loan)	2016	Série C	3	0	—		—		2 (Note: Appearance(s) in Copa Sudamericana)	0	—		5	0
Atlético Tubarão	2017	Catarinense	—		11	1	—		—		—		11	1
São José-RS	2017	Série D	3	0	—		—		—		9 (Note: Appearance(s) in Copa FGF)	0	12	0
Maringá	2018	Série D	8	0	12	0	—		—		—		20	0
Londrina	2018	Série B	21	2	—		—		—		—		21	2
Londrina	2019	Série B	22	2	—		1	0	—		—		23	2
Londrina	2020	Série C	0	0	1	0	0	0	—		—		1	0
Londrina	Total		43	4	1	0	1	0	—		—		45	4
Novorizontino (loan)	2020	Série D	0	0	7	0	—		—		—		7	0
Chapecoense (loan)	2020	Série B	29	5	10	2	2	0	—		—		41	7
Chapecoense (loan)	2021	Série A	0	0	0	0	0	0	—		—		0	0
Chapecoense (loan)	Total		29	5	10	2	2	0	—		—		41	7
Career total			130	13	72	6	11	0	2	0	9	0	224	19

== Honours ==
São José-RS

- Copa FGF: 2017

Chapecoense

- Campeonato Catarinense: 2020
- Campeonato Brasileiro Série B: 2020
