= Bruno Grassi =

Brazilian footballer (born 1987)

Personal information
- Full name: Bruno Medeiros Grassi
- Date of birth: 5 March 1987 (age 39)
- Place of birth: Tubarão, Brazil
- Height: 1.90 m (6 ft 3 in)
- Position: Goalkeeper

Youth career
- 2006–2007: Internacional

Senior career*
Years	Team	Apps	(Gls)
2007	Internacional	0	(0)
2008–2010	Marítimo B	7	(0)
2008	Marítimo	1	(0)
2009–2010	→ Tourizense (loan)	13	(0)
2010	Concórdia	15	(0)
2011	Ypiranga-RS	12	(0)
2011	São Paulo-RS	0	(0)
2012	Araripina	0	(0)
2012	Mogi Mirim	0	(0)
2013–2014	Passo Fundo	0	(0)
2014	Águia de Marabá	14	(0)
2015	Cruzeiro-RS	0	(0)
2015–2018	Grêmio	28	(0)
2019	Criciúma	18	(0)
2020–2021	CSA	8	(0)
2021	Paraná	28	(0)
2021–2022	Barra	4	(0)
2022–2023	Jeddah	32	(0)
2023–2024	Al-Ain	29	(0)
2024–2025	Radwa		
- * Club domestic league appearances and goals as of 21 September 2019

Bruno Medeiros Grassi (born 5 March 1987) is a retired Brazilian professional footballer who played as a goalkeeper.

== Football career ==
Born in Tubarão, Santa Catarina, 20-year-old Grassi arrived in Portugal in January 2008 and signed with C.S. Marítimo from Sport Club Internacional, along with teammate João Guilherme. He acted as third-choice during his early years, also playing with the reserves in the third division. On 7 December 2008, he made his first-team – and Primeira Liga – debut, conceding all six goals in a 0–6 home loss against S.L. Benfica after starter Marcos (his compatriot) was sent off in the 18th minute.

For 2009–10, Grassi was loaned to third-level side G.D. Tourizense, being released by the Madeira club at the end of the season and resuming his career in his country's lower leagues. On 22 April 2015, he signed a two-year deal with Grêmio Foot-Ball Porto Alegrense, initially as a backup to Marcelo Grohe.

On 23 July 2022, Grassi joined Saudi Arabian club Jeddah.

On 27 July 2023, Grassi joined Saudi First Division side Al-Ain.

On 4 September 2024, Grassi joined Saudi Third Division side Radwa.

== Career statistics ==
As of 27 May 2017

Club	Season	League			National Cup		Continental		Other		Total	
Club	Season	Division	Apps	Goals	Apps	Goals	Apps	Goals	Apps	Goals	Apps	Goals
Internacional	2007	Série A	0	0	0	0	0	0	0	0	0	0
Internacional	Total		0	0	0	0	0	0	0	0	0	0
Marítimo	2007–08	Primeira Liga	0	0	0	0	0	0	0	0	0	0
Marítimo	2008–09	Primeira Liga	1	0	0	0	0	0	0	0	1	0
Marítimo	2009–10	Primeira Liga	0	0	0	0	0	0	0	0	0	0
Marítimo	Total		1	0	0	0	0	0	0	0	1	0
Tourizense (loan)	2009–10	Second Division	13	0	0	0	0	0	0	0	13	0
Tourizense (loan)	Total		13	0	0	0	0	0	0	0	13	0
Concórdia	2010	Catarinense	0	0	0	0	0	0	15	0	15	0
Concórdia	Total		0	0	0	0	0	0	15	0	15	0
Ypiranga-RS	2011	Gaúcho	0	0	1	0	0	0	12	0	13	0
Ypiranga-RS	Total		0	0	1	0	0	0	12	0	13	0
São Paulo-RS	2011	Gaúcho	0	0	0	0	0	0	0	0	0	0
São Paulo-RS	Total		0	0	0	0	0	0	0	0	0	0
Araripina	2012	Pernambucano	0	0	0	0	0	0	8	0	8	0
Araripina	Total		0	0	0	0	0	0	8	0	8	0
Mogi Mirim	2012	Série D	0	0	0	0	0	0	0	0	0	0
Mogi Mirim	Total		0	0	0	0	0	0	0	0	0	0
Passo Fundo	2013	Gaúcho	0	0	0	0	0	0	16	0	16	0
Passo Fundo	2014	Gaúcho	0	0	0	0	0	0	15	0	15	0
Passo Fundo	Total		0	0	0	0	0	0	31	0	31	0
Águia de Marabá	2014	Série C	14	0	0	0	0	0	0	0	14	0
Águia de Marabá	Total		14	0	0	0	0	0	0	0	14	0
Cruzeiro-RS	2015	Gaúcho	0	0	0	0	0	0	16	0	16	0
Cruzeiro-RS	Total		0	0	0	0	0	0	16	0	16	0
Grêmio	2015	Série A	5	0	0	0	0	0	0	0	5	0
Grêmio	2016	Série A	8	0	1	0	0	0	4	0	13	0
Grêmio	2017	Série A	0	0	0	0	0	0	4	0	4	0
Grêmio	Total		13	0	1	0	0	0	8	0	22	0
Career total			41	0	2	0	0	0	90	0	133	0

== Honours ==
Grêmio

- Copa do Brasil: 2016
- Copa Libertadores: 2017
- Recopa Sudamericana: 2018
