= William Shuster =

William Shuster or Schuster may refer to:

- Bill Schuster (1912–1987), American baseball player
- William Morgan Shuster (1877–1960), American lawyer and civil servant
- William Howard Shuster (1893–1969), American artist
- Bill Shuster (born 1961), American politician and lobbyist
- William Schuster (born 1987), Brazilian footballer

== See also ==
- Will Schuester
