= Gabriel Blos =

Brazilian footballer (born 1989)

Personal information
- Full name: Gabriel Rybar Blos
- Date of birth: 28 February 1989 (age 37)
- Place of birth: Marques de Souza, Brazil
- Height: 1.91 m (6 ft 3 in)
- Position: Centre back

Team information
- Current team: Grêmio

Youth career
- –2008: Pato Branco

Senior career*
Years	Team	Apps	(Gls)
2009	Pato Branco	6	(0)
2010–2013	Lajeadense	41	(4)
2012	→ Rio Branco-AC (loan)	0	(0)
2013	Grêmio	11	(0)
- * Club domestic league appearances and goals as of 8 March 2015

Gabriel Rybar Blos (born 28 February 1989), or simply Gabriel, was a Brazilian professional footballer who played as a centre back for Grêmio. He's injured since September 2013, when he had problems with ligaments and had to undergo surgery on his left knee. He ended his professional career in June 2020.

== Career statistics ==
As of 8 March 2015.

Club	Season	League			National Cup		Continental		Other		Total	
Club	Season	Division	Apps	Goals	Apps	Goals	Apps	Goals	Apps	Goals	Apps	Goals
Lajeadense	2011	State	0	0	0	0	0	0	9	0	9	0
Lajeadense	2012	State	0	0	0	0	0	0	16	1	16	1
Lajeadense	2013	Série D	0	0	0	0	0	0	16	3	16	3
Lajeadense	Total		0	0	0	0	0	0	41	4	41	4
Grêmio (loan)	2013	Série A	9	0	1	0	1	0	0	0	11	0
Grêmio (loan)	2014	Série A	0	0	0	0	0	0	0	0	0	0
Grêmio (loan)	Total		9	0	1	0	1	0	0	0	11	0
Grêmio	2015	Série A	0	0	0	0	0	0	0	0	0	0
Grêmio	Total		0	0	0	0	0	0	0	0	0	0
Career total			9	0	1	0	1	0	41	4	52	4
