= Walace (footballer, born 1995) =

Brazilian footballer

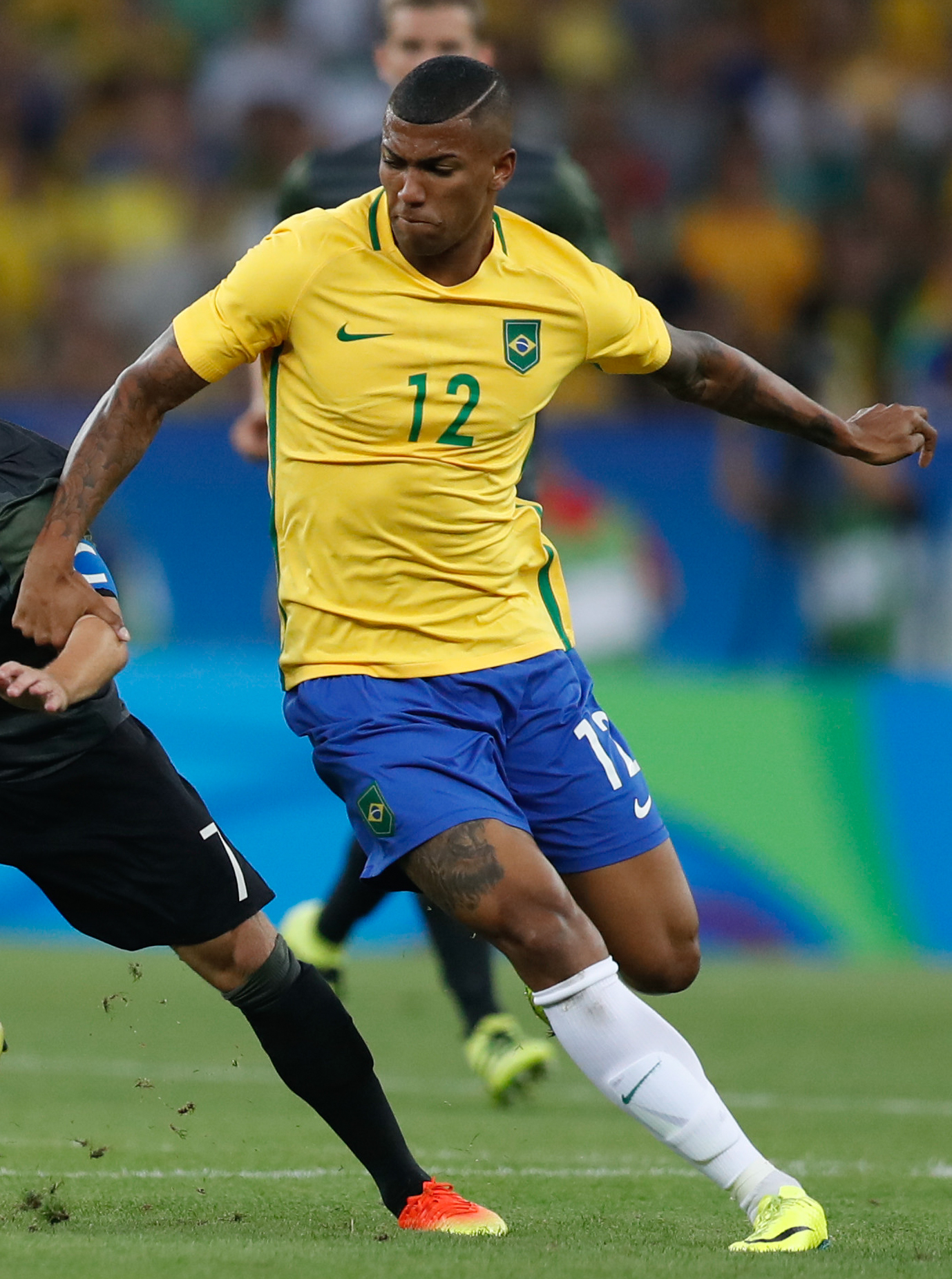
- Walace at the 2016 Olympics

Personal information
- Full name: Walace Souza Silva
- Date of birth: 4 April 1995 (age 31)
- Place of birth: Salvador, Brazil
- Height: 1.88 m (6 ft 2 in)
- Position: Defensive midfielder

Team information
- Current team: Vitória (on loan from Cruzeiro)
- Number: 15

Youth career
- 2010: Simões Filho
- 2011–2013: Avaí
- 2012: → Bahia (loan)
- 2013–2014: Grêmio

Senior career*
Years	Team	Apps	(Gls)
2014–2017	Grêmio	77	(1)
2017–2018	Hamburger SV	27	(2)
2018–2019	Hannover 96	26	(1)
2019–2024	Udinese	160	(3)
2024–	Cruzeiro	31	(0)
2026–	→ Vitória (loan)	0	(0)

International career^{‡}
2015	Brazil U20	5	(0)
2016	Brazil U23	4	(0)
2016–2018	Brazil	5	(0)
Medal record
Olympic Games
Gold medal – first place	2016 Rio de Janeiro	Team
- * Club domestic league appearances and goals as of 13 December 2025 ‡ National team caps and goals as of 20 November 2018

Walace Souza Silva (born 4 April 1995), or simply Walace (Brazilian Portuguese: [ˈwalasi]), is a Brazilian professional footballer who plays as a defensive midfielder for Campeonato Brasileiro Série A club Vitória, on loan from Cruzeiro.

== Club career ==
=== Grêmio ===
Born in Salvador, Bahia, Walace started his youth career with the academy of amateur Simões Filho Futebol Clube. While playing in a cup, he caught the eye of a scout of Avaí Futebol Clube and subsequently joined the club in the next year. However, he was soon loaned to the under-23 team of Esporte Clube Bahia in the same year. In 2013, Walace joined the under-18 team of Grêmio.

Walace was promoted to the senior squad of the club in 2014 by manager Enderson Moreira. On 27 April, he made his first team debut against Atlético Mineiro. In August, he made his first start for the club in a 2–0 defeat against Sport Club Internacional, where he was assigned to mark Andrés D'Alessandro. At the end of the season, media reports suggested that Italian club SSC Napoli, Portuguese clubs FC Porto and S.L. Benfica expressed their interest to sign him.

After the appointment of Roger Machado as the club's manager in 2015, Walace became an undisputed starter for the club. In June, Grêmio rejected an offer from Swiss club FC Basel to secure his services. On 5 October, his contract was extended till 2018. In July 2016, he scored his first league goal in a 2–1 victory over Figueirense Futebol Clube.

=== Hamburger SV ===
On 31 January 2017, Walace moved to German club Hamburger SV, signing a contract until 2021. Eleven days later, he scored his first goal in a 3–0 victory against RB Leipzig.

=== Hannover 96 ===
In June 2018, Walace joined league rivals Hannover 96 on a four-year contract until 2022. The transfer fee paid to Hamburger SV was estimated at €6 million with 10% of the fee going to former club Grêmio.

== International career ==
In June 2016, Walace was called by Dunga to the senior international squad for the 2016 Copa America as a replacement for Luiz Gustavo (who left the squad citing personal reasons). He featured once in the tournament, in a 7–1 victory against Haiti.

In the next month, Walace was called to the Brazil under-23 squad for the 2016 Summer Olympics to be held at the month of August. He came as a replacement for Fred, whose club FC Shakhtar Donetsk refused to release him for the tournament. He featured four times in the tournament, with his side emerging as the winner.

== Career statistics ==
As of match played 7 June 2024

Club	Season	National League			State League		Cup		Continental		Total	
Club	Season	Division	Apps	Goals	Apps	Goals	Apps	Goals	Apps	Goals	Apps	Goals
Grêmio	2014	Série A	19	0	0	0	1	0	—		20	0
Grêmio	2015	Série A	34	0	8	0	8	0	—		50	0
Grêmio	2016	Série A	24	1	8	3	9	0	4 (Note: Appearances in Copa Libertadores)	1	45	5
Grêmio	Total		77	1	16	3	18	0	4	1	115	5
Hamburger SV	2016–17	Bundesliga	9	1	—		2	0	—		11	1
Hamburger SV	2017–18	Bundesliga	18	1	—		1	0	—		19	1
Hamburger SV	Total		27	2	—		3	0	—		30	2
Hannover 96	2018–19	Bundesliga	26	1	—		2	0	—		28	1
Udinese	2019–20	Serie A	20	0	–		2	0	–		22	0
Udinese	2020–21	Serie A	30	0	–		0	0	–		30	0
Udinese	2021–22	Serie A	36	1	–		2	0	–		38	1
Udinese	2022–23	Serie A	37	0	–		–		–		37	0
Udinese	2023–24	Serie A	37	2	–		1	0	–		38	2
Udinese	Total		160	3	—		5	0	—		165	3
Career total			252	7	16	3	27	0	4	1	299	11

== Honours ==
=== Club ===
Grêmio

- Copa do Brasil: 2016

=== International ===
Brazil

- Olympic Gold Medal: 2016
