= Marcelo Oliveira (footballer, born 1987) =

Brazilian footballer

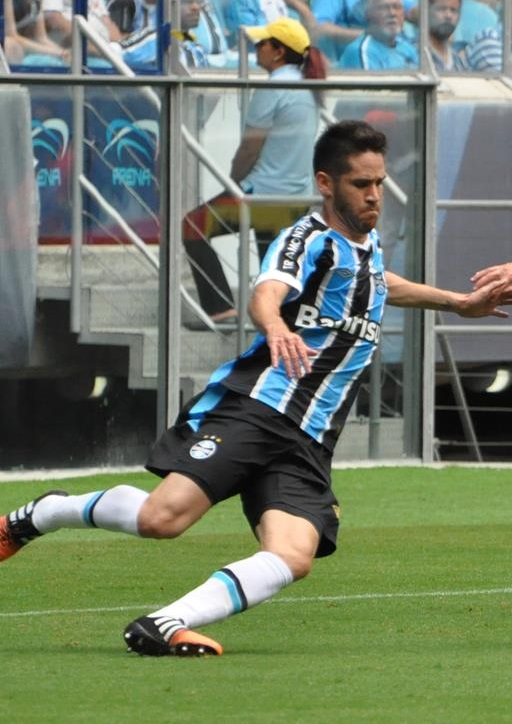
- Oliveira with Grêmio in 2015

Personal information
- Full name: Marcelo Oliveira Ferreira
- Date of birth: 29 March 1987 (age 39)
- Place of birth: Salvador, Brazil
- Height: 1.84 m (6 ft 0 in)
- Positions: Defender; defensive midfielder

Youth career
- 2004–2005: Corinthians

Senior career*
Years	Team	Apps	(Gls)
2006–2011	Corinthians	25	(1)
2006–2007	→ Paulista (loan)		
2010	→ Grêmio Prudente (loan)	28	(0)
2011	→ Atlético Paranaense (loan)	21	(0)
2012–2014	Cruzeiro	25	(0)
2013–2014	→ Palmeiras (loan)	40	(0)
2015–2020	Grêmio	164	(5)
- * Club domestic league appearances and goals as of 11 December 2016

Marcelo Oliveira Ferreira (born 29 March 1987) is a Brazilian former professional footballer who played as a left back, defensive midfielder or central defender.

== Career ==
Marcelo Oliveira started his professional career on loan at Paulista in 2006. He made his professional debut against Juventude he helped Timão to win the match.

In June 2007 he scored his 1st senior goal for Corinthians against América-RN. Marcelo Oliveira was injured in a Série A match against Grêmio on August 8, 2007, and was out for the rest of the 2007 season.

On February 4, 2013, Oliveira, in an exchange for Luan, signed for Palmeiras until the end of season.

== Career statistics ==
As of 8 March 2015

Club	Season	League			National Cup		Continental		Other		Total	
Club	Season	Division	Apps	Goals	Apps	Goals	Apps	Goals	Apps	Goals	Apps	Goals
Corinthians	2009	Série A	11	0	1	0	0	0	0	0	12	0
Corinthians	2010	Série A	0	0	0	0	0	0	0	0	0	0
Corinthians	2011	Série A	0	0	0	0	1	0	7	0	8	0
Corinthians	Total		11	0	1	0	1	0	7	0	20	0
Grêmio Prudente (loan)	2010	Série A	28	0	0	0	2	0	18	1	48	1
Grêmio Prudente (loan)	Total		28	0	0	0	2	0	18	1	48	1
Atlético Paranaense (loan)	2011	Série A	21	0	0	0	2	0	0	0	23	0
Atlético Paranaense (loan)	Total		21	0	0	0	2	0	0	0	23	0
Cruzeiro	2012	Série A	25	0	5	0	0	0	12	0	42	0
Cruzeiro	2013	Série A	0	0	0	0	0	0	0	0	0	0
Cruzeiro	2014	Série A	0	0	0	0	0	0	0	0	0	0
Cruzeiro	Total		25	0	5	0	0	0	12	0	42	0
Palmeiras (loan)	2013	Série B	12	0	0	0	8	0	8	1	28	1
Palmeiras (loan)	2014	Série A	28	0	8	0	0	0	16	0	52	0
Palmeiras (loan)	Total		40	0	8	0	8	0	24	1	80	1
Grêmio	2015	Série A	0	0	0	0	0	0	8	1	8	1
Grêmio	Total		0	0	0	0	0	0	8	1	8	1
Career total			125	0	14	0	13	0	69	3	221	3

== Honours ==
Corinthians

- Copa do Brasil: 2009

Palmeiras

- Campeonato Brasileiro Série B: 2013

Grêmio

- Copa do Brasil: 2016
- Copa Libertadores: 2017
- Recopa Sudamericana: 2018
