= Alan Schons =

Brazilian footballer (born 1993)

Personal information
- Full name: Alan Eduardo Schons
- Date of birth: 24 May 1993 (age 33)
- Place of birth: Bom Princípio, Brazil
- Height: 1.80 m (5 ft 11 in)
- Position: Midfielder

Youth career
- Juventude

Senior career*
Years	Team	Apps	(Gls)
2014–2015	Juventude	16	(1)
2015–2019	Moreirense	56	(1)
2019–2021	Penafiel	16	(2)
- * Club domestic league appearances and goals as of 22 January 2021

Alan Eduardo Schons (born 24 May 1993) is a Brazilian professional footballer who plays as a midfielder.

== Honors ==
Moreirense

- Taça da Liga: 2016–17
