= Pedro Geromel =

Brazilian association football player (born 1985)

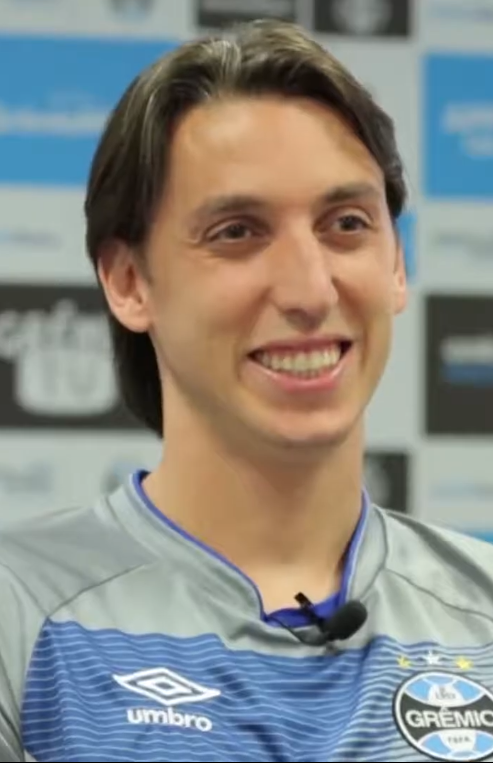
- Geromel in 2017

Personal information
- Full name: Pedro Tonon Geromel
- Date of birth: 21 September 1985 (age 41)
- Place of birth: São Paulo, Brazil
- Height: 1.90 m (6 ft 3 in)
- Position: Centre-back

Youth career
- 1996–1999: Portuguesa
- 1999–2003: Palmeiras
- 2003–2004: Chaves

Senior career*
Years	Team	Apps	(Gls)
2004–2005	Chaves	15	(0)
2005–2008	Vitória Guimarães	68	(1)
2008–2015	1. FC Köln	116	(4)
2012–2013	→ Mallorca (loan)	38	(1)
2014–2015	→ Grêmio (loan)	66	(3)
2016–2024	Grêmio	341	(12)
Total		663	(22)

International career
2016–2018	Brazil	2	(0)
- * Club domestic league appearances and goals

Pedro Tonon Geromel (born 21 September 1985) is a Brazilian former professional footballer who played as a centre-back. Geromel also holds an Italian passport because of his grandfather.

== Club career ==
=== Early years ===
Born in São Paulo, Geromel moved to Portugal from Sociedade Esportiva Palmeiras along with Elias. He signed with G.D. Chaves at only 18 and finished his footballing formation there, after which he made his professional debut in the 2004–05 season, with the northern team in the second division.

=== Vitória Guimarães ===
Geromel's performances there attracted the attention of Primeira Liga club Vitória SC. At Guimarães, after making his debut in a 2–0 derby home loss against S.C. Braga, he eventually became an undisputed first-choice, as the Minho side promoted from the second level and achieved qualification to the UEFA Champions League in just two seasons.

=== 1. FC Köln ===
In an online voting, Geromel was considered as 2007–08's best player in the Portuguese League, beating FC Porto's Lisandro López and Lucho González. On 30 June 2008, he moved to Bundesliga club 1. FC Köln, recently promoted to the top division.

An undisputed first-choice from the beginning, Geromel impressed enough during his first two years in Germany, reportedly being courted by Real Madrid from La Liga. Eventually, nothing came of it.

On 23 August 2012, Geromel signed a four-year loan deal with RCD Mallorca in Spain. In his first season he contributed with 29 starts and one goal (2,612 minutes of action), but the Balearic Islands team were relegated from the top flight; in December 2013 he rescinded his agreement and returned to his country, to sign for two years and a half with Grêmio while still owned by Köln.

== International career ==
On 27 August 2016, Geromel was called up for the Brazil national team by coach Tite, replacing the injured Rodrigo Caio. His first cap arrived the following 25 January, when he played the full 90 minutes in a 1–0 friendly win over Colombia at the Estádio Olímpico Nilton Santos.

In May 2018, Geromel was selected for that year's FIFA World Cup in Russia.

== Career statistics ==
=== Club ===
As of 7 February 2021

Appearances and goals by club, season and competition
Club	Season	League			State League		National Cup		Continental		Other		Total	
Club	Season	Division	Apps	Goals	Apps	Goals	Apps	Goals	Apps	Goals	Apps	Goals	Apps	Goals
Chaves (loan)	2004–05	Segunda Liga	15	0	—		0	0	—		0	0	15	0
Vitória Guimarães	2005–06	Primeira Liga	18	0	—		2	0	2 (Note: Appearance(s) in UEFA Cup)	0	0	0	22	0
Vitória Guimarães	2006–07	Segunda Liga	21	0	—		0	0	—		0	0	21	0
Vitória Guimarães	2007–08	Primeira Liga	29	1	—		3	0	—		2 (Note: Appearance(s) in Taça da Liga)	0	34	1
Vitória Guimarães	Total		68	1	—		5	0	2	0	2	0	77	1
1. FC Köln	2008–09	Bundesliga	32	1	—		2	0	—		—		34	1
1. FC Köln	2009–10	Bundesliga	29	1	—		3	0	—		—		32	1
1. FC Köln	2010–11	Bundesliga	27	2	—		1	0	—		—		28	2
1. FC Köln	2011–12	Bundesliga	28	0	—		1	0	—		—		29	0
1. FC Köln	Total		116	4	—		7	0	—		—		123	4
Mallorca (loan)	2012–13	La Liga	30	1	—		3	1	—		—		33	2
Mallorca (loan)	2013–14	Segunda División	8	0	—		1	0	—		—		9	0
Mallorca (loan)	Total		38	1	—		4	1	—		—		42	2
Grêmio (loan)	2014	Série A	24	0	4	0	0	0	3 (Note: Appearance(s) in Copa Libertadores)	0	—		31	0
Grêmio (loan)	2015	Série A	31	0	7	2	7	1	—		—		45	3
Grêmio	2016	Série A	26	3	10	2	8	0	7	0	2 (Note: Appearance(s) in Primeira Liga (Brazil))	0	53	5
Grêmio	2017	Série A	20	0	10	0	4	0	10	1	2 (Note: Appearance(s) in FIFA Club World Cup)	0	46	1
Grêmio	2018	Série A	20	2	8	0	3	0	11	0	2 (Note: Appearance(s) in Recopa Sudamericana)	0	44	2
Grêmio	2019	Série A	20	1	7	0	6	0	10	0	—		43	3
Grêmio	2020	Série A	13	0	7	0	5	0	7	0	—		32	0
Grêmio	2021	Série A	18	0	4	0	3	0	4 (Note: Appearance(s) in Copa Sudamericana)	0	—		29	0
Grêmio	Total		172	6	53	4	36	1	52	1	6	0	323	14
Career total			409	10	53	4	52	2	54	1	8	0	576	21

=== International ===
As of 17 June 2018

Appearances and goals by national team and year
National team	Year	Apps	Goals
Brazil	2017	1	0
Brazil	2018	1	1
Total		2	1

== Honours ==
Grêmio

- Copa do Brasil: 2016
- Copa Libertadores: 2017
- Recopa Sudamericana: 2018
- Campeonato Gaúcho: 2018, 2019, 2020, 2021, 2022, 2023, 2024
- Recopa Gaúcha: 2019, 2021, 2022, 2023

Individual

- Bola de Prata: 2015, 2016, 2017, 2018
- Campeonato Brasileiro Série A Team of the Year: 2016, 2017, 2018
- Best Centre-back in Brazil: 2016, 2018
- Grêmio Hall of Fame: 2019
