= Tiago Machowski =

Brazilian footballer

Personal information
- Date of birth: 16 May 1993 (age 33)
- Place of birth: Rio Azul, Brazil
- Height: 1.90 m (6 ft 3 in)
- Position: Goalkeeper

Youth career
- 2008–2013: Grêmio

Senior career*
Years	Team	Apps	(Gls)
2014–2017	Grêmio	20	(0)
2018	Santa Cruz	20	(0)

International career
2011	Brazil U18		
- * Club domestic league appearances and goals

Tiago Machowski (born 16 May 1993) is a Brazilian former professional footballer who played as a goalkeeper.

== Career ==
Born in Rio Azul, Tiago Machowski went through a period of testing at the Academy of Grêmio in 2008, having been approved. Since then, he joined the youth teams of the club, until he was promoted to the first team squad for the 2014 season. He made his professional debut on 16 March, in a 3–0 home win against Pelotas, by the Campeonato Gaúcho. In October 2014, Tiago received two opportunities to start the match as the holder Marcelo Grohe was called to the Brazil national team. He excelled in these two matches, gaining confidence in the club.

== Career statistics ==
As of 8 March 2015.

Club	Season	League			National Cup		Continental		Other		Total	
Club	Season	Division	Apps	Goals	Apps	Goals	Apps	Goals	Apps	Goals	Apps	Goals
Grêmio	2014	Série A	3	0	0	0	0	0	1	0	4	0
Grêmio	2015	Série A	12	0	0	0	0	0	4	0	16	0
Grêmio	2016	Série A	0	0	0	0	0	0	0	0	0	0
Grêmio	Total		15	0	0	0	0	0	5	0	20	0
Career total			15	0	0	0	0	0	5	0	20	0
