= Luan (footballer, born March 1993) =

Brazilian footballer

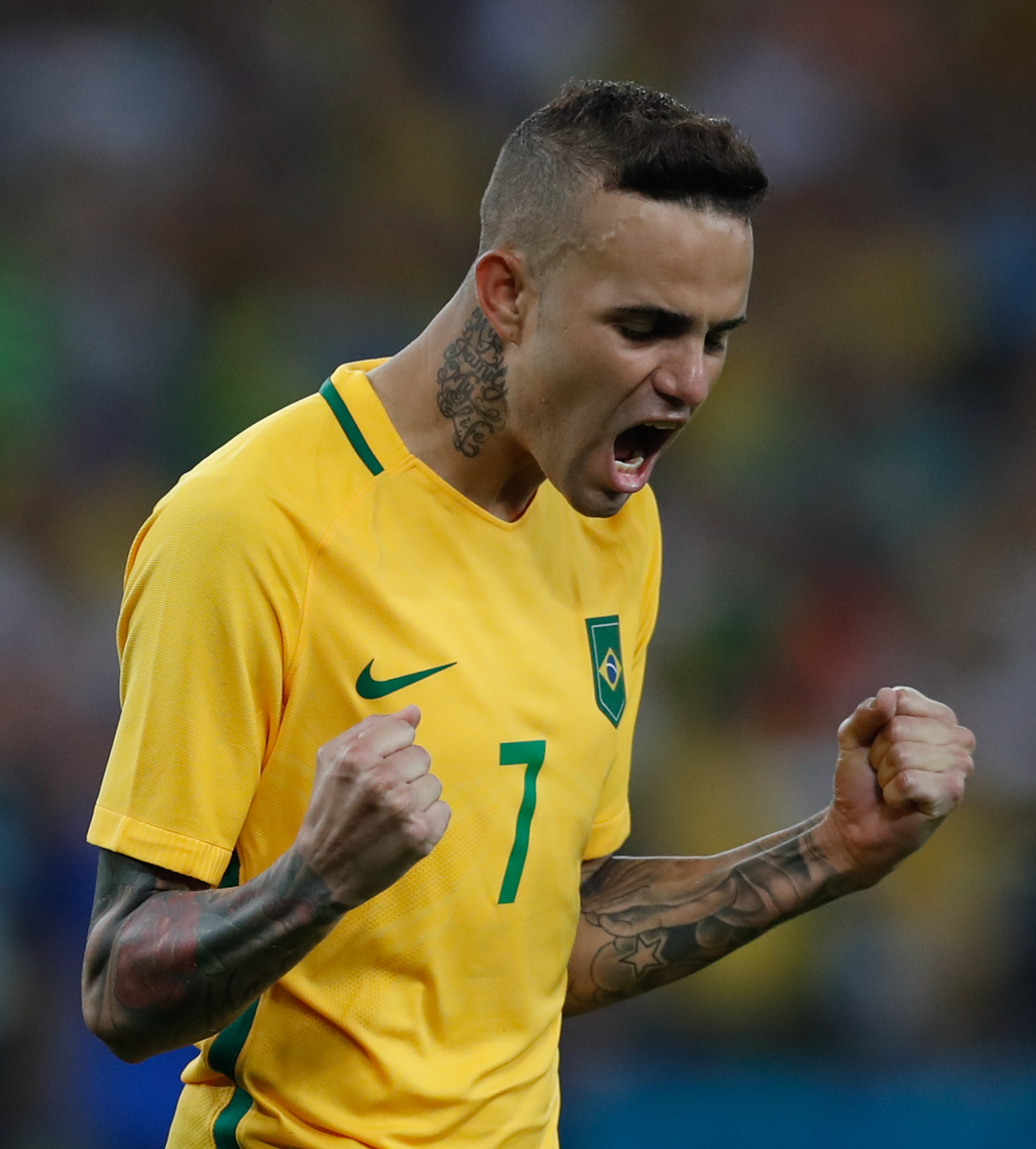
- Luan with Brazil in the 2016 Olympic Games

Personal information
- Full name: Luan Guilherme de Jesus Vieira
- Date of birth: 27 March 1993 (age 33)
- Place of birth: São José do Rio Preto, Brazil
- Height: 1.80 m (5 ft 11 in)
- Positions: Forward; attacking midfielder

Team information
- Current team: no club

Youth career
- 2012–2013: Tanabi
- 2013: → América-SP (loan)
- 2013: Grêmio

Senior career*
Years	Team	Apps	(Gls)
2012	Tanabi	9	(2)
2013	Catanduvense	1	(0)
2014–2019	Grêmio	212	(55)
2020–2023	Corinthians	68	(5)
2022	→ Santos (loan)	8	(1)
2023	Grêmio	5	(0)
2024–	Vitória	0	(0)

International career^{‡}
2014	Brazil U20	4	(3)
2015–2016	Brazil U23	11	(6)
2017	Brazil	2	(0)
Medal record
Olympic Games
Gold medal – first place	2016 Rio de Janeiro	Team
- * Club domestic league appearances and goals as of 02:36, 11 November 2022 (UTC) ‡ National team caps and goals as of 15 December 2017

Luan Guilherme de Jesus Vieira (born 27 March 1993), commonly known as Luan or Luan Vieira, is a Brazilian professional footballer who plays as a second striker or attacking midfielder. He can also play as a centre-forward or left winger. He is currently without a club.

== Club career ==
=== Early career ===
Luan was born in São José do Rio Preto, São Paulo. After starting it out at futsal and playing for amateur clubs in his native state, he joined Tanabi.

Luan scored two goals in nine appearances for Tanabi, being also a teammate of Túlio Maravilha. He subsequently represented his hometown club América-SP in 2013 Copa São Paulo de Futebol Júnior, while still owned by Tanabi.

On 8 February 2013, Luan joined Catanduvense until the end of the year, for a fee of R$120,000. He made his maiden appearance for the club eight days later, coming on as a second-half substitute in a 1–3 home loss against Santo André.

=== Grêmio ===
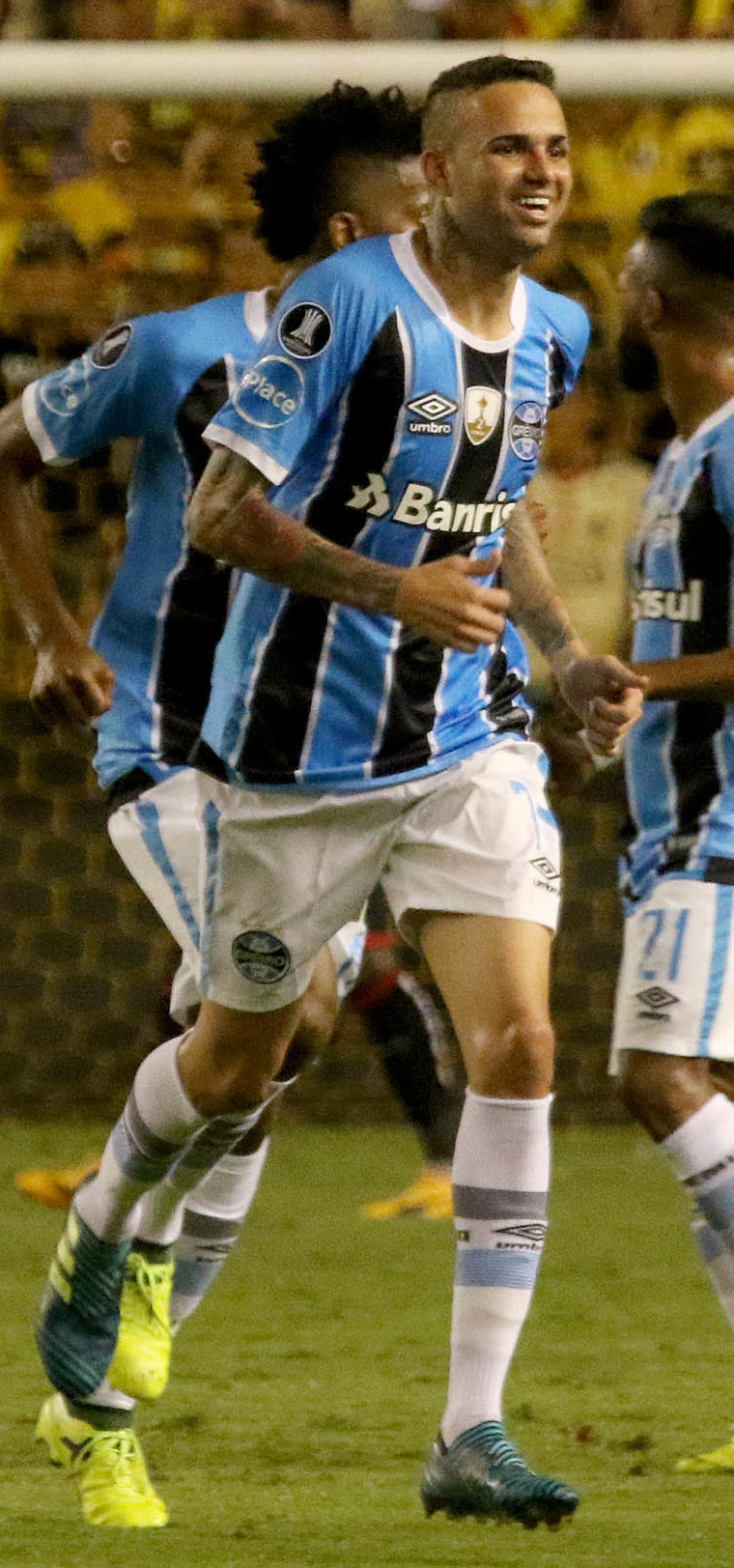
Luan playing for Grêmio in 2017

Shortly after making his debut for Catanduvense, Luan moved to Grêmio and returned to youth football; he later had 50% of his federative rights bought for just R$ 300,000. He was promoted to the first team in December 2013, mainly as a backup to Kléber and Hernán Barcos.

Luan made his first team debut for Tricolor on 19 January 2014, starting in a 0–1 Campeonato Gaúcho away loss against São José. His debut club goal was ten days later, netting the equalizer in a 1–1 draw at Brasil de Pelotas.

Luan finished the tournament with 14 appearances and three goals, as his side finished second. He made his Série A debut on 27 April 2014, starting in a 2–1 home win against Atlético Mineiro.

Luan scored his first goal in the Brazilian football top division on 17 August 2014, netting the first through a penalty in a 2–0 home success over Criciúma. He scored three more goals in the 2014 season, also appearing in the year's Copa Libertadores.

On 29 March 2015, Luan scored all goals in a 2–0 home win against São Paulo-RS. In the 2015 Campeonato Brasileiro, he scored ten goals to help his side finish third; highlights included braces against fierce rivals Internacional (5–0 home win) and Palmeiras (2–3 away loss).

On 30 November 2015, Luan was included in the year's Brasileirão Team of the Year, being the tournament's best forward alongside Santos' Ricardo Oliveira.

Luan is the top scorer at the Arena do Grêmio with 29 goals. In August 2017, it was reported that Liverpool had sent scouts to monitor his progress.

Luan scored of one of Grêmio's goals in the 2017 Copa Libertadores final against Lanús and Grêmio won the title. He was voted the best player of the 2017 Copa Libertadores with eight goals in twelve appearances and was again voted to the Campeonato Brasileiro Team of the Year in 2017.

In October 2018, Luan suffered a muscle tear in his foot and could not participate in Grêmio's 2018 Copa Libertadores semi-final against River Plate, in which Grêmio were eliminated. Luan finished the 2018 Campeonato Brasileiro with one goal.

=== Corinthians ===
On 14 December 2019, it was announced that Luan would be sold to Corinthians for around R$ 22 million. It was reported that he received a four-year contract. After scoring twice in two pre-season matches, he made his official debut for the club on 23 January 2020, starting and scoring his team's second through a penalty kick in a 4–1 Campeonato Paulista home routing of Botafogo-SP.

Despite being a regular starter in the 2020 Campeonato Paulista, Luan lost his starting spot after the departure of manager Tiago Nunes, and was constantly an unused substitute in the following years.

==== Loan to Santos ====
On 5 August 2022, Luan moved to Santos on loan until the end of the season, with an option for an additional year. On 22 November, after just eight appearances, Santos announced that his loan would not be renewed.

== International career ==
Luan was named in Brazil's provisional squad for Copa América Centenario but was cut from the final squad. Later in the season, he was selected as a member of Brazil's squad for the 2016 Summer Olympics.

In Brazil's quarter final clash with Colombia, Luan scored the second goal of the match in an eventual 2–0 win, and finished the tournament as a starter. On 26 January 2017, he made his full international debut, replacing Diego Souza in a 1–0 friendly win against Colombia.

== Career statistics ==
=== Club ===
As of 10 November 2022.

Club	Season	League			State League		National Cup		Continental		Other		Total	
Club	Season	Division	Apps	Goals	Apps	Goals	Apps	Goals	Apps	Goals	Apps	Goals	Apps	Goals
Tanabi	2012	Paulista 2ª Divisão	—		9	2	—		—		—		9	2
Catanduvense	2013	Paulista A2	—		1	0	—		—		—		1	0
Grêmio	2014	Série A	28	4	14	3	1	0	7 (Note: Appearance(s) in Copa Libertadores)	1	—		50	8
Grêmio	2015	Série A	33	10	15	4	8	3	—		—		56	17
Grêmio	2016	Série A	25	6	11	5	8	1	8	0	2 (Note: Appearance(s) in Primeira Liga)	0	54	12
Grêmio	2017	Série A	20	6	12	3	6	1	12	8	1 (Note: Appearance(s) in FIFA Club World Cup)	0	51	18
Grêmio	2018	Série A	18	1	9	4	3	2	8	3	2 (Note: Appearance(s) in Recopa Sudamericana)	1	40	11
Grêmio	2019	Série A	20	4	7	5	3	0	6	0	0	0	36	9
Grêmio	Total		144	31	68	24	29	7	41	12	5	1	287	75
Corinthians	2020	Série A	22	2	16	2	2	0	2	1	—		42	5
Corinthians	2021	Série A	18	0	9	1	2	0	4 (Note: Appearance(s) in Copa Sudamericana)	3	—		33	4
Corinthians	2022	Série A	0	0	3	0	0	0	0	0	—		3	0
Corinthians	Total		40	2	28	3	4	0	6	4	—		78	9
Santos (loan)	2022	Série A	8	1	—		—		—		—		8	1
Career total			192	34	106	29	33	7	47	16	5	1	383	87

=== International ===
As of 26 October 2021

Appearances and goals by national team and year
National team	Year	Apps	Goals
Brazil	2017	2	0
Total		2	0

== Honours ==
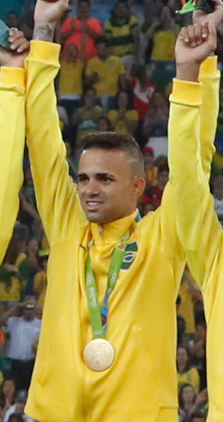
Luan with the Olympic Gold Medal in 2016

=== Club ===
Grêmio

- Copa do Brasil: 2016
- Copa Libertadores: 2017
- Recopa Sudamericana: 2018
- Campeonato Gaúcho: 2018, 2019

=== International ===
Brazil U23

- Olympic Gold Medal: 2016

Brazil U20

- Toulon Tournament: 2014

=== Individual ===
- Campeonato Gaúcho XI: 2014
- Campeonato Gaúcho Best Newcomer: 2014
- Best Midfielder in Brazil: 2015
- Campeonato Brasileiro Série A Team of the Year: 2015, 2017
- Bola de Prata: 2015, 2017
- Copa Libertadores Best Player: 2017
- South American Footballer of the Year: 2017
