= Jakson Follmann =

Brazilian footballer (born 1992)

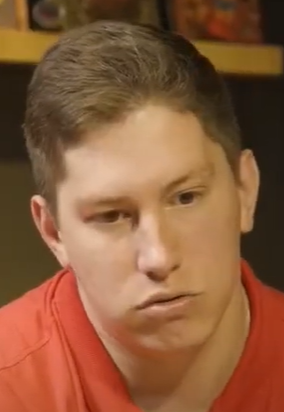

Personal information
- Full name: Jakson Ragnar Follmann
- Date of birth: 14 March 1992 (age 34)
- Place of birth: Alecrim, Brazil
- Height: 1.86 m (6 ft 1 in)
- Position: Goalkeeper

Youth career
- 2008: Grêmio
- 2009–2010: Juventude

Senior career*
Years	Team	Apps	(Gls)
2011–2013	Juventude	15	(0)
2013–2015	Grêmio	4	(0)
2015	→ Linense (loan)	1	(0)
2016	URT	12	(0)
2016	Chapecoense	0	(0)
Total		32	(0)
- * Club domestic league appearances and goals

Jakson Ragnar Follmann (Brazilian Portuguese: [(d)ʒakˈsõ fowˈmɐ̃]; born 14 March 1992), sometimes known as just Follmann, is a Brazilian sports commentator, singer and former professional footballer who last played as a goalkeeper for Brazilian club Chapecoense.

Follmann is one of just six survivors in the crash of LaMia Airlines Flight 2933 which killed 71 people including 19 Chapecoense players.

During his career as a professional footballer, he used to play the guitar and sing as a hobby. Having sustained career-ending injuries in the aforementioned plane crash, he was forced to retire early and later decided to pursue a career in music.

== Club career ==
Born in Alecrim, Rio Grande do Sul, Follmann joined Grêmio's youth setup in 2008, but left in the following year for Juventude. Promoted to the latter's first team during the 2010 season, he only became a regular starter in the 2012 season.

On 28 December 2012 Follmann returned to Grêmio, as a partnership between the club and Juventude was established. As third-choice behind Marcelo Grohe and Tiago Machowski, he only appeared rarely for the club, with the vast majority of his contributions being in the Campeonato Gaúcho.

On 14 November 2014, Follmann was loaned to Linense until the end of 2015 Campeonato Paulista. His first and only appearances for the club came on the following 20 March, coming on as a half-time substitute for ever-present Anderson in a 0–0 away draw against Ituano.

On 5 November 2015, Follmann rescinded his contract with Grêmio and joined URT. He made his debut for the club on 31 January, starting in a 0–0 draw versus Cruzeiro, and was an undisputed starter as the club impressed in the 2016 Campeonato Mineiro by reaching the semifinals of the competition.

After impressing with URT, Follmann signed for Chapecoense on 10 May 2016. A backup to Danilo, he made his first (and only) appearance for the club on 26 August by starting in a 0–1 Copa Sudamericana away loss against Cuiabá.

On 28 November 2016, Follmann was one of six survivors when LaMia Airlines Flight 2933 crashed during a flight from Santa Cruz, Bolivia to Medellín, Colombia. As a result of the accident, one of his legs needed to be amputated.

== Recovery and Paralympics ==
Three months after the career-ending disaster, Follmann posted a video on Instagram in which he showed great physical recovery, having fully adapted to the use of a prosthetic leg. Follmann plans to represent Brazil at the Paralympic level of football.

== Career statistics ==
As of 27 November 2016

Club	Season	League			State League		Cup		Continental		Other		Total	
Club	Season	Division	Apps	Goals	Apps	Goals	Apps	Goals	Apps	Goals	Apps	Goals	Apps	Goals
Juventude	2011	Série D	0	0	0	0	0	0	—		3 (Note: Appearance(s) in Copa FGF)	0	3	0
Juventude	2012	Série D	10	0	5	0	2	0	—		—		17	0
Juventude	Total		10	0	5	0	2	0	—		3	0	20	0
Grêmio	2013	Série A	0	0	1	0	0	0	—		1	0	2	0
Grêmio	2014	Série A	0	0	3	0	0	0	—		—		3	0
Grêmio	Total		0	0	4	0	0	0	—		1	0	5	0
Linense	2015	Paulista	—		1	0	—		—		—		1	0
URT	2016	Série D	0	0	12	0	—		—		—		12	0
Chapecoense	2016	Série A	0	0	—		0	0	1 (Note: Appearance(s) in Copa Sudamericana)	0	—		1	0
Career total			10	0	22	0	2	0	1	0	4	0	39	0

== Honours ==
Juventude

- Campeonato Gaúcho Sub-20: 2010
- Copa FGF: 2011

Chapecoense

- Copa Sudamericana: 2016
