= Ramiro (footballer, born 1993) =

Brazilian footballer (born 1993)

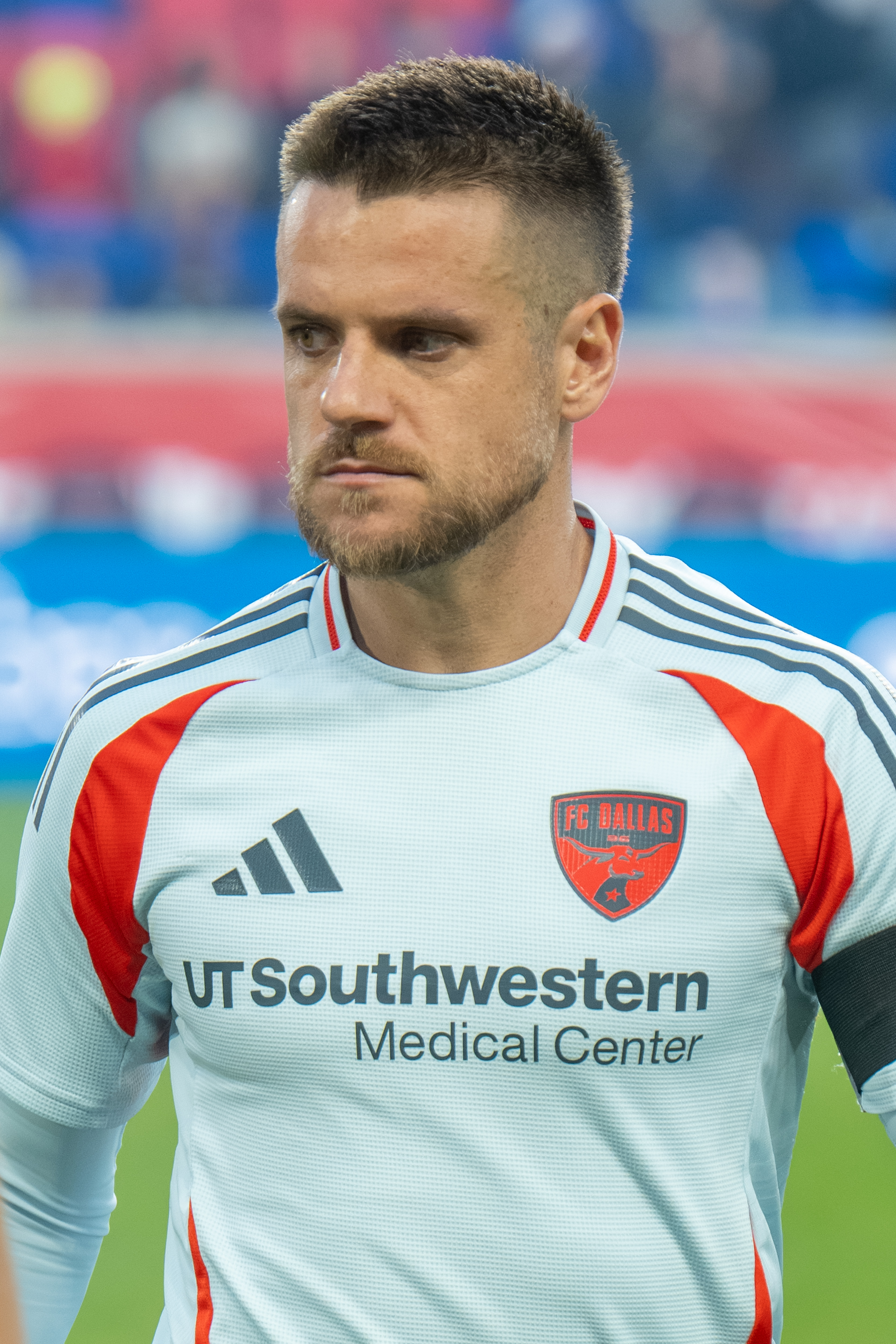
- Ramiro with FC Dallas in 2026

Personal information
- Full name: Ramiro Moschen Benetti
- Date of birth: 22 May 1993 (age 33)
- Place of birth: Gramado, Brazil
- Height: 1.68 m (5 ft 6 in)
- Positions: Midfielder; right-back

Team information
- Current team: FC Dallas
- Number: 17

Youth career
- 2003–2010: Juventude

Senior career*
Years	Team	Apps	(Gls)
2011–2012	Juventude	24	(2)
2013–2018	Grêmio	251	(23)
2019–2022	Corinthians	117	(5)
2021–2022	→ Al-Wasl (loan)	34	(2)
2023–2024	Cruzeiro	33	(3)
2025–	FC Dallas	4	(0)
- * Club domestic league appearances and goals as of 18 December 2024

Ramiro Moschen Benetti (born 22 May 1993), simply known as Ramiro, is a Brazilian professional footballer who plays for FC Dallas. Mainly a defensive midfielder, he can also play as a right-back.

== Career ==
Born in Gramado, Rio Grande do Sul, Ramiro began his career on Juventude. He made his professional debut on 13 February 2011, against Lajeandense in Campeonato Gaúcho. He scored his first goal on 30 March, in a 3–2 home win over Grêmio.

In December, Ramiro was transferred to Grêmio, after a partnership was established with Juventude. He made his Grêmio debut on 20 January 2013, against Esportivo. On 1 June, Ramiro made his Série A debut, playing the last 29 minutes in a 1–1 away draw against Santos. In April 2014, Ramiro revealed in an interview that is Grêmio supporter since childhood, despite having acquired affection for Juventude. His dream was to play a Copa Libertadores de América by the club, which held in 2013.

On 13 December 2018, Ramiro joined Corinthians on a deal running until 2022.

Ramiro was announced as a new signing for Major League Soccer side FC Dallas on 18 December 2024, signing on a two-year deal for their 2025 and 2026 seasons.

== Career statistics ==
As of 31 July 2018

Club	Season	League			State League		Cup		Continental		Other		Total	
Club	Season	Division	Apps	Goals	Apps	Goals	Apps	Goals	Apps	Goals	Apps	Goals	Apps	Goals
Juventude	2011	Série D	4	1	7	1	0	0	—		8 (Note: Appearance(s) in Copa FGF)	1	19	3
Juventude	2012	Série D	5	0	5	0	3	0	—		11	0	24	0
Juventude	Subtotal		9	1	12	1	3	0	—		19	1	43	3
Grêmio	2013	Série A	29	1	5	0	6	0	—		—		40	1
Grêmio	2014	Série A	33	2	13	0	1	0	7 (Note: Appearance(s) in Copa Libertadores)	1	—		54	3
Grêmio	2015	Série A	5	0	7	1	1	0	—		—		13	1
Grêmio	2016	Série A	22	1	5	0	7	1	4	1	1 (Note: Appearance(s) in Primeira Liga)	0	39	3
Grêmio	2017	Série A	26	6	14	4	6	0	12 (Note: Ten appearances and one goal in Copa Libertadores, two appearances in FIFA Club World Cup)	1	—		60	11
Grêmio	2018	Série A	10	1	10	2	1	0	6	2	—		27	4
Grêmio	Subtotal		125	11	54	7	22	1	29	5	1	0	139	9
Career total			134	12	66	8	25	1	11	2	20	1	182	12

== Honours ==
=== Club ===
Juventude

- Copa FGF: 2011, 2012

Grêmio

- Copa do Brasil: 2016
- Copa Libertadores: 2017
- Recopa Sudamericana: 2018
- Campeonato Gaúcho: 2018

Corinthians

- Campeonato Paulista: 2019
