= Fred (footballer, born 1986) =

Brazilian footballer

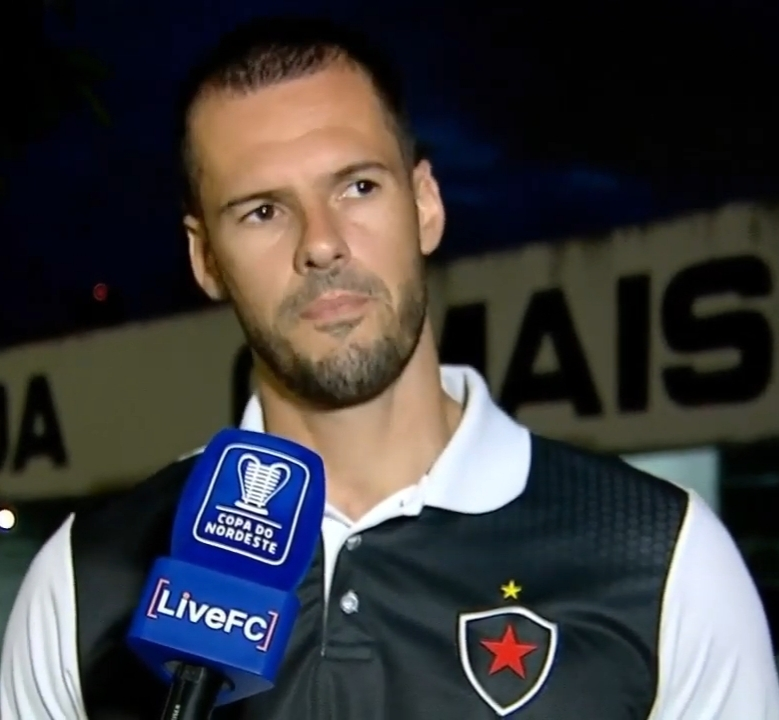

Personal information
- Full name: Frederico Burgel Xavier
- Date of birth: 15 January 1986 (age 40)
- Place of birth: Novo Hamburgo, Brazil
- Height: 1.88 m (6 ft 2 in)
- Position: Centre back

Team information
- Current team: Botafogo PB

Youth career
- 2004–2006: Internacional

Senior career*
Years	Team	Apps	(Gls)
2004–2006	Internacional	0	(0)
2006–2008	Standard Liège	10	(0)
2008–2009	Dender	23	(2)
2010–2011	Juventude	16	(1)
2012	Figueirense	10	(0)
2012	Avaí	6	(2)
2013	Juventude	0	(0)
2013	São Caetano	21	(4)
2014	Novo Hamburgo	0	(0)
2014	Caxias	5	(0)
2015	Novo Hamburgo	0	(0)
2015	Goiás	25	(3)
2016–2018	Grêmio	11	(2)
2017	→ Vitória (loan)	13	(1)
2018	Juventude	22	(2)
2018	Novo Hamburgo	0	(0)
2019–	Botafogo PB	4	(1)
- * Club domestic league appearances and goals as of 23:36, 19 June 2019 (UTC)

Frederico Burgel Xavier (born 15 January 1986), commonly known as Fred, is a Brazilian footballer who plays as a central defender for Botafogo PB.

== Career ==
On 12 December 2018, he joined Campeonato Brasileiro Série D side Novo Hamburgo after a spell at Juventude.

== Honours ==
Grêmio

- Copa do Brasil: 2016

Vitória

- Campeonato Baiano: 2017
