= Nena (footballer, born 1981) =

Brazilian footballer

Personal information
- Full name: Ygor da Silva
- Date of birth: 19 December 1981 (age 44)
- Place of birth: Santos, Brazil
- Height: 1.84 m (6 ft 0 in)
- Position: Forward

Youth career
- São Vicente

Senior career*
Years	Team	Apps	(Gls)
2005–2006	São Vicente		
2006	Botafogo-SP		
2006	América-RN		
2007	Cascavel CR		
2007	Olímpia		
2008	São Bento		
2008	XV de Piracicaba		
2008	Londrina		
2008	ASA		
2009	São Bernardo FC		
2009	ASA		
2009	Vila Nova		
2010	São Bernardo FC		
2010	ASA		
2011	São Bernardo FC		
2011	São José-SP		
2011	Red Bull Brasil		
2012	Metropolitano		
2012	Icasa		
2012	Noroeste		
2013	Caldense		
2013	Guarani		
2014–2016	Brasil de Pelotas		
2017	Ituano		
2018	Manaus		
2019	Esportivo		
2020	Penarol-AM		
2020	Portuguesa Santista		
2020–2021	Santa Cruz-RS		
2021	Guarani-VA		
2022	Santa Cruz-RS		

International career
2013	Equatorial Guinea	1	(0)
- * Club domestic league appearances and goals as of 14 January 2024

Ygor da Silva (born 19 December 1981), better known as Nena, is a Brazilian born and Equatoguinean naturalized former professional footballer who played as a forward.

== Club career ==
Born in Santos, Nena began her career at São Vicente AC. Having played for several clubs in Brazilian football, the athlete was notable for being top scorer twice in editions of the lower divisions of the Brazilian Championship: in 2009 in Série C, playing for ASA, and in 2014 in Série D, playing for Brasil de Pelotas. He was Amazonian champion in 2018 with Manaus, and ended his career at FC Santa Cruz, winning the FGF Cup and the Gáucho Série B with the club.

== International career ==
Naturalized under the influence of a friend Jonatas Obina, Nena played one match for the Equatorial Guinea national team on 24 March 2013, vs. Cape Verde. Due to later problems with documentation, he was never called up again.

== Honours ==
Manaus

- Campeonato Amazonense: 2018

Santa Cruz-RS

- Copa Ibsen Pinheiro: 2020
- Campeonato Gaúcho Série B: 2021

Individual

- 2009 Campeonato Brasileiro Série C top scorer: 9 goals
- 2014 Campeonato Brasileiro Série D top scorer: 8 goals
