= Luís Mário =

Brazilian footballer (born 1976)

Personal information
- Full name: Luís Mário Miranda da Silva
- Date of birth: November 1, 1976 (age 50)
- Place of birth: Vigia, Pará, Brazil
- Height: 1.76 m (5 ft 9 in)
- Position: Striker

Team information
- Current team: Rio Branco

Youth career
- 1993–1994: Remo

Senior career*
Years	Team	Apps	(Gls)
1995–1996	Remo		
1997–1998	Mogi Mirim		
1999–2000	Corinthians	15	(1)
2001–2003	Grêmio	53	(11)
2003	→ Anyang LG Cheetahs (loan)	20	(4)
2004	Coritiba	8	(1)
2004–2005	Vitória SC	28	(3)
2005	Atlético	19	(2)
2006	Ponte Preta	23	(3)
2007	Botafogo	5	(0)
2007	St. Gallen	6	(0)
2008	Paysandu	?	(?)
2008	Criciúma		
2009–2010	Mogi Mirim		
2010	ASA	24	(0)
2011	Macaé		
2011	Bragantino	23	(2)
2012	Grêmio Catanduvense		
2012–	Rio Branco		
- * Club domestic league appearances and goals

Luís Mário Miranda da Silva or simply Luís Mário (born November 1, 1976, in Vigia-PA), is a Brazilian striker.

== Club career ==
He played for FC Seoul of the South Korean K League, then known as Anyang LG Cheetahs.

== Honours ==
- Rio de Janeiro's Cup: 2007
