= William Schuster =

Brazilian footballer (born 1987)

Personal information
- Full name: William Schuster Dornelles da Silva
- Date of birth: 31 May 1987 (age 39)
- Place of birth: Porto Alegre, Brazil
- Height: 1.80 m (5 ft 11 in)
- Position: Midfielder

Team information
- Current team: Novo Hamburgo

Youth career
- 1997–2001: Grêmio
- 2001–2007: Porto-PE

Senior career*
Years	Team	Apps	(Gls)
2007	Porto-PE		
2008–2011	3 de Febrero	40	(3)
2009	→ Guaraní (loan)	7	(0)
2011	Independiente CG	18	(1)
2012	Deportivo Petare	8	(0)
2012–2013	Sportivo Luqueño	28	(1)
2014	12 de Octubre	33	(1)
2015	Novo Hamburgo	0	(0)
2015	Grêmio	5	(0)
2016	Atlético Goianiense	17	(2)
2016–2017	Muaither	13	(0)
2017	Fortaleza	2	(0)
2017	Náutico	10	(0)
2018	Bragantino	0	(0)
2018	Boa	4	(0)
2019–	Novo Hamburgo	0	(0)
- * Club domestic league appearances and goals as of 00:41, 25 April 2019 (UTC)

William Schuster Dornelles da Silva (born 31 May 1987), known as William Schuster, is a Brazilian footballer who plays as a midfielder for Novo Hamburgo.
