= 2017 Grêmio FBPA season =

Grêmio
2017 season
- President: Romildo Bolzan Jr.
- Manager: Renato Portaluppi
- Stadium: Arena do Grêmio
- Campeonato Brasileiro Série A: 4th
- Copa do Brasil: Semi-finals
- Copa Libertadores: Winners
- Primeira Liga: Quarter-finals
- Campeonato Gaúcho: Semi-finals
- FIFA Club World Cup: Runners-up
- Top goalscorer: League: Ramiro (2); All: Lucas Barrios (10)
- Highest home attendance: 45,903 (vs. Internacional – 4 March)
- Lowest home attendance: 2,944 (vs. Ceará – 02 March)
- Average home league attendance: 20,289
Home colours	Away colours	Third colours

The 2017 season is Grêmio Foot-Ball Porto Alegrense's 114th season in existence and the club's 12th consecutive season in the top division of Brazilian football. At this season, Grêmio will again participate in the Campeonato Brasileiro Série A, the Copa Libertadores, the Copa do Brasil, the Campeonato Gaúcho and the Primeira Liga.

== Club ==
=== Staff ===
Board members

- President: Romildo Bolzan Jr.
- Vice-president: Adalberto Preis
- Vice-president: Antônio Dutra Júnior
- Vice-president: Cláudio Oderich
- Vice-president: Marcos Herrmann
- Vice-president: Sergei Costa
- Vice-president of football: Odorico Roman
- Football adviser: Alexandre Rolim
- Director of football: Saul Berdichevski
- Superintendent: Antônio Carlos Verardi
- Supervisor of football: Marcelo Rudolph

Coaching staff

- Manager: (Brazil) Renato Portaluppi
- Assistant coach: (Brazil) Alexandre Mendes
- Technical coordinator: (Brazil) Valdir Espinosa
- Fitness coach: (Brazil) Rogério Dias
- Assistant fitness coach: (Brazil) Mário Pereira
- Assistant fitness coach: (Brazil) Gabriel Alves
- Goalkeeper coach: (Brazil) Rogério Godoy
- Performance analyst: (Brazil) Eduardo Cecconi
- Performance analyst: (Brazil) Antônio Cruz
- Performance analyst: (Brazil) Rafael Tavares

=== Kit ===
Supplier: Umbro
Sponsor(s): Banrisul / Unimed

Home	Away

== Squad information ==
=== First team squad ===
Players and informations last updated on 21 May 2017.
Note: Flags indicate national team as has been defined under FIFA eligibility rules. Players may hold more than one non-FIFA nationality.

No.	Name	Nat.	Position(s)	Date of birth (age)	Since	Until	Signed from	Apps	Goals	Notes
Goalkeepers
1	Marcelo Grohe	(Brazil)	GK	13 January 1987 (age 39)	2005	2020	Academy	315	0	National team
20	Léo Jardim	(Brazil)	GK	5 March 1995 (age 31)	2014	2020	Academy	7	0	
30	Bruno Grassi	(Brazil)	GK	5 March 1987 (age 39)	2015	2017	(Brazil) Cruzeiro-RS	13	0	
40	Dida	(Brazil)	GK	14 November 1997 (age 28)	2016	2018	Academy	0	0	
Defenders
2	Edílson	(Brazil)	RB	27 July 1986 (age 40)	2016	2019	(Brazil) Corinthians	77	4	
3	Pedro Geromel	(Brazil)	CB	21 September 1985 (age 41)	2014	2019	(Germany) FC Köln	140	8	Vice-captain | National team
4	Walter Kannemann	(Argentina)	CB / LB	14 March 1991 (age 35)	2016	2019	(Mexico) Atlas	37	0	
6	Leonardo Gomes	(Brazil)	RB / DM	30 June 1996 (age 30)	2017	2018	(Brazil) Boa Esporte	4	0	
12	Bruno Cortez	(Brazil)	LB	11 March 1987 (age 39)	2017	2017	Free agent	5	0	
15	Rafael Thyere	(Brazil)	CB	17 May 1993 (age 33)	2013	2017	Academy	31	0	
22	Bressan	(Brazil)	CB	15 January 1993 (age 33)	2013	2017	(Brazil) Juventude	110	5	
26	Marcelo Oliveira	(Brazil)	LB / DM / CB	29 March 1987 (age 39)	2015	2016	(Brazil) Cruzeiro	126	5	3rd captain
33	Bruno Rodrigo	(Brazil)	CB	12 April 1985 (age 41)	2017	2017	Free agent	1	0	
88	Léo Moura	(Brazil)	RB / RM	23 October 1978 (age 48)	2017	2017	(Brazil) Santa Cruz	16	3	
—	Gabriel Blos	(Brazil)	CB	28 February 1989 (age 37)	2013	2019	(Brazil) Lajeadense	11	0	Source
Midfielders
5	Michel	(Brazil)	DM / CM / LB	22 March 1990 (age 36)	2016	2017	(Brazil) Grêmio Novorizontino	13	1	On loan
8	Maicon	(Brazil)	CM / AM	14 September 1985 (age 41)	2015	2019	(Brazil) São Paulo	95	2	Captain | National team | Source
17	Ramiro	(Brazil)	DM / CM / RM / RB	22 May 1993 (age 33)	2013	2016	(Brazil) Juventude	163	12	
25	Jailson	(Brazil)	DM / CM	18 March 1995 (age 31)	2015	2019	Academy	51	2	
28	Kaio Mendes	(Brazil)	DM / RB	18 March 1995 (age 31)	2015	2017	Academy	21	0	
29	Arthur	(Brazil)	DM / CM / AM	12 August 1996 (age 30)	2015	2020	Academy	10	0	National team
35	Machado	(Brazil)	DM / CM	20 January 1996 (age 30)	2016	2019	Academy	1	0	
—	Douglas	(Brazil)	AM	18 February 1982 (age 44)	2015	2018	(Brazil) Monte Azul	229	42	Source
Forwards
7	Luan	(Brazil)	LW / ST / AM	27 March 1993 (age 33)	2014	2018	Academy	182	47	National team
9	Jael	(Brazil)	ST	30 October 1988 (age 38)	2017	2017	Free agent	3	0	
11	Everton	(Brazil)	LW / RW	28 March 1996 (age 30)	2014	2018	Academy	107	16	
18	Lucas Barrios	(Paraguay)	ST	13 November 1984 (age 41)	2017	2017	(Brazil) Palmeiras	12	6	National team
19	Beto da Silva	(Peru)	LW / ST	28 December 1996 (age 29)	2017	2021	(Netherlands) PSV Eindhoven	0	0	National team
21	Fernandinho	(Brazil)	LW / RW	25 November 1985 (age 40)	2014	2018	(United Arab Emirates) Al-Jazira Club	58	4	

=== Starting XI ===
4–2–3–1 Formation

According to the most recent line-ups, not most used players (in Notes).

No.	Pos.	Nat.	Name	MS	Notes
1	GK	(Brazil)	Marcelo Grohe	49	
2	DF	(Brazil)	Edílson	33	Léo Moura has 20 starts.
3	DF	(Brazil)	Pedro Geromel	38	
4	DF	(Argentina)	Walter Kannemann	49	
12	DF	(Brazil)	Bruno Cortez	41	
17	MF	(Brazil)	Ramiro	51	
29	MF	(Brazil)	Arthur	44	
7	MF	(Brazil)	Luan	44	
5	MF	(Brazil)	Michel	45	
21	MF	(Brazil)	Fernandinho	50	
18	FW	(Paraguay)	Lucas Barrios	40	

Last updated: 30 October 2017.
Source: Squad statistics and Start formations
Only competitive matches.
Using the most used start formation.
Ordered by position on pitch (from back right to front left).

=== Transfers ===
==== Transfers in ====
#	Position	Player	Transferred from	Fee	Date	Team	Source
37	DF	(Brazil) Lucas Rex	(Brazil) Macaé	Loan return	1 January 2017	Reserves	
47	MF	(Brazil) Rondinelly	(Brazil) Londrina	Loan return	1 January 2017	Reserves	
43	FW	(Brazil) Lucas Coelho	(Brazil) Avaí	Loan return	1 January 2017	Reserves	
—	FW	(Brazil) Yuri Mamute	(Brazil) Náutico	Loan return	1 January 2017	Reserves	
14	MF	(Uruguay) Maxi Rodríguez	(Uruguay) Peñarol	Loan return	1 January 2017	First team	
21	FW	(Brazil) Fernandinho	(Brazil) Flamengo	Loan return	1 January 2017	First team	
88	DF	(Brazil) Léo Moura	(Brazil) Santa Cruz	Free transfer (end of contract)	10 January 2017	First team	
6	DF	(Brazil) Leonardo Gomes	(Brazil) Boa Esporte	Undisclosed	12 January 2017	First team	
9	FW	(Brazil) Jael	(Brazil) Joinville	Free transfer (end of contract)	18 January 2017	First team	
19	FW	(Peru) Beto da Silva	(Netherlands) PSV Eindhoven	Undisclosed (~£400,000)	20 January 2017	First team	
12	DF	(Brazil) Bruno Cortez	(Japan) Albirex Niigata	Free transfer (end of contract)	28 January 2017	First team	
22	DF	(Brazil) Bressan	(Uruguay) Peñarol	Loan return	31 January 2017	First team	
18	FW	(Paraguay) Lucas Barrios	(Brazil) Palmeiras	Free transfer (end of contract)	28 February 2017	First team	
10	MF	(Argentina) Gastón Fernández	Universidad de Chile	Undisclosed (~$500,000)	4 March 2017	First team	
—	DF	(Brazil) Bruno Rodrigo	Unattached	Free transfer	8 March 2017	First team	

==== Transfers out ====
#	Position	Player	Transferred to	Fee	Date	Team	Source
22	DF	(Brazil) Marcelo Hermes	(Portugal) Benfica (Note: Upon the expiry of Hermes's contract, he joined Benfica.)	Free transfer (end of contract)	31 December 2016	First team	
77	MF	(Brazil) Negueba	(Brazil) Atlético-GO (Note: Upon the expiry of Negueba's contract, he joined Atlético Goianiense.)	Free transfer (Released)	31 December 2016	First team	
16	DF	(Brazil) Wesley Campos	(Brazil) Internacional (Note: Upon the expiry of Wesley's contract, he joined Internacional.)	Loan expired	31 December 2016	Reserves	
12	MF	(Brazil) Walace	(Germany) Hamburger SV	Undisclosed (~£10,000,000)	30 January 2017	First team	
32	FW	(Brazil) Pedro Rocha	(Russia) FC Spartak Moscow	Disclosed (£12,000,000)	30 August 2017	First team	

Total incoming: ▲ Undisclosed (~£22,000,000+)

==== Loans in ====
#	Position	Player	Loaned from	Date	Loan expires	Team	Source
5	MF	(Brazil) Michel	(Brazil) Novorizontino	1 January 2017	31 December 2017	First team	
—	MF	(Uruguay) Martín Chaves	(Uruguay) Peñarol	20 February 2017	31 December 2017	Reserves	
—	MF	(Brazil) Matheus Henrique	(Brazil) São Caetano	16 February 2017	31 December 2017	Reserves	
—	MF	(Brazil) Lucas Vinicius	(Brazil) Criciúma	17 March 2017	30 June 2018	Reserves	

==== Loans out ====
#	Position	Player	Loaned to	Date	Loan expires	Team	Source
—	GK	(Brazil) Guilherme Gritti	(Brazil) Ypiranga	1 January 2017	1 May 2017	Reserves	
—	MF	(Brazil) Araújo	(Brazil) Ypiranga	1 January 2017	1 May 2017	Reserves	
—	DF	(Brazil) Iago Alves	(Brazil) São Paulo-RS	1 January 2017	1 May 2017	Reserves	
—	MF	(Brazil) Leandro Canhoto	(Brazil) São Paulo-RS	1 January 2017	1 May 2017	Reserves	
36	DF	(Brazil) Denilson	(Brazil) PSTC	1 January 2017	1 May 2017	Reserves	
—	MF	(Brazil) Santiago Somália	(Brazil) PSTC	1 January 2017	1 May 2017	Reserves	
43	MF	(Brazil) Guilherme Amorim	(Brazil) Tubarão	1 January 2017	1 May 2017	First team	
—	FW	(Brazil) Paulinho Moccelin	(Brazil) Tubarão	1 January 2017	1 May 2017	Reserves	
—	FW	(Brazil) Marcos Paulo	(Brazil) Tubarão	1 January 2017	1 May 2017	Reserves	
—	DF	(Brazil) Breno	(Brazil) São Bernardo	1 January 2017	1 May 2017	Reserves	
—	DF	(Brazil) Willyan	(Brazil) Votuporanguense	1 January 2017	1 May 2017	Reserves	
—	FW	(Brazil) Erik	(Brazil) Luverdense	1 January 2017	31 December 2017	Reserves	
21	MF	(Brazil) Felipe Tontini	(Brazil) Ceará	7 January 2017	31 December 2017	First team	
6	DF	(Brazil) Fred	(Brazil) Vitória	10 January 2017	31 December 2017	First team	
14	DF	(Brazil) Wallace Reis	(Turkey) Gaziantepspor	11 January 2017	31 June 2018	First team	
37	MF	(Brazil) Moisés Wolschick	(Brazil) Chapecoense	13 January 2017	31 December 2017	First team	
91	FW	(Brazil) Henrique Almeida	(Brazil) Coritiba	17 January 2017	31 December 2017	First team	
38	FW	(Brazil) Guilherme	(Brazil) Botafogo	19 January 2017	31 December 2017	First team	
35	FW	(Brazil) Matheus Batista	(Portugal) Tondela	31 January 2017	31 June 2018	First team	
—	FW	(Brazil) Yuri Mamute	(Kazakhstan) Aktobe	16 February 2017	31 June 2018	Reserves	
10	MF	(Argentina) Gastón Fernández	(Argentina) Estudiantes de La Plata	6 August 2017	31 December 2018	Reserves	
23	FW	(Ecuador) Miller Bolaños	(Mexico) Club Tijuana	29 August 2017	31 December 2019	Reserves	
27	MF	(Brazil) Lincoln	(Turkey) Çaykur Rizespor	30 August 2017	31 June 2018	Reserves	

== Competitions ==
=== Overview ===
Competition	First match	Last match	Starting round	Final position	Record							
Competition	First match	Last match	Starting round	Final position	Pld	W	D	L	GF	GA	GD	Win %
Série A	14 May 2017	3 December 2017	Matchday 1	4th	38	18	8	12	55	36	+19	47.37
Copa do Brasil	17 May 2017	23 August 2017	Round of 16	Semi-finals	6	5	0	1	13	4	+9	83.33
Campeonato Gaúcho	2 February 2017	23 April 2017	Matchday 1	Semi-finals	15	7	6	2	25	11	+14	46.67
Primeira Liga	8 February 2017	30 August 2017	Group stage	Quarter-finals	4	1	1	2	2	5	−3	25.00
Copa Libertadores	9 March 2017	29 November 2017	Group stage	Winners	14	10	2	2	25	9	+16	71.43
FIFA Club World Cup	12 December 2017	16 December 2017	Semi-finals	Runners-up	2	1	0	1	1	1	+0	50.00
Total					79	42	17	20	121	66	+55	53.16

Source: Competitions

=== Campeonato Gaúcho ===
==== Matches ====
2 February 1	Grêmio	2–0	Ypiranga	Porto Alegre
				Stadium: Arena do Grêmio

5 February 2	Caxias	2–1	Grêmio	Caxias do Sul
				Stadium: Centenário

12 February 3	Grêmio	1–0	Passo Fundo	Porto Alegre
				Stadium: Arena do Grêmio

19 February 4	Grêmio	2–0	São José-PA	Porto Alegre
				Stadium: Arena do Grêmio

25 February 5	Cruzeiro	0–2	Grêmio	Gravataí
				Stadium: Estádio Antônio Vieira Ramos

4 March 6	Grêmio	2–2	Internacional	Porto Alegre
				Stadium: Arena do Grêmio

15 March 7	Brasil de Pelotas	1–1	Grêmio	Pelotas
				Stadium: Estádio Bento Freitas

19 March 8	Grêmio	1–1	Veranópolis	Porto Alegre
				Stadium: Arena do Grêmio

22 March 9	Novo Hamburgo	1–1	Grêmio	Novo Hamburgo
				Stadium: Estádio do Vale

25 March 10	Grêmio	4–0	Juventude	Porto Alegre
				Stadium: Arena do Grêmio

29 March 11	São Paulo	1–0	Grêmio	Rio Grande do Sul
				Stadium: Estádio Aldo Dapuzzo

==== Knockout stage ====
===== Matches =====
====== Quarter-finals ======
2 April First leg	Veranópolis	0–2	Grêmio	Veranópolis
				Stadium: Estádio Antônio David Farina

8 April Second leg	Grêmio	5–0 (7–0 agg.)	Veranópolis	Porto Alegre
				Stadium: Arena do Grêmio

=== Semi-finals ===
16 April First leg	Grêmio	1–1	Novo Hamburgo	Porto Alegre
				Stadium: Arena do Grêmio

23 April Second leg	Novo Hamburgo	1–1 (1–1 agg.) (7–6 p)	Grêmio	Novo Hamburgo
				Stadium: Estádio do Vale

=== Primeira Liga ===
==== Group stage ====
===== Group B =====
Pos	Team	Pld	W	D	L	GF	GA	GD	Pts	Qualification
1	Flamengo	3	2	1	0	3	0	+3	7	Qualifies to the Final stage
2	Grêmio	3	1	1	1	2	3	−1	4	Qualifies to the Final stage
3	Ceará	3	0	3	0	1	1	0	3	
4	América	3	0	1	2	0	2	−2	1	

===== Matches =====
8 February 1	Flamengo	2–0	Grêmio	Brasília
19:30 UTC−02:00	Éverton 43'; Berrío 78'; Diego (yellow card) 80'	Report	Bressan (yellow card) 89'	Stadium: Mané Garrincha; Attendance: 20,224; Referee: Bráulio Machado

2 March 2	Grêmio	1–1	Ceará	Porto Alegre
21:30 UTC−03:00	Rex 54'; W. Oliveira (yellow card) 65'	Report	Alves 19'; Éverson (yellow card) 66'; Silva (yellow card) 77'; Lucas (yellow card) 79'; Rangel (yellow card) 90'	Stadium: Arena do Grêmio; Attendance: 2,944; Referee: Rodrigo Ferreira

5 April 3	Grêmio	1–0	América-MG	Porto Alegre
19:30 UTC−03:00	Everton 45+1'; M. Rodríguez (red card) 90+4'	Report	Silva (red card) 90+4'	Stadium: Arena do Grêmio; Attendance: 4,829; Referee: Arilson Anunciação

==== Knockout stage ====
===== Matches =====
====== Quarter-finals ======
30 August Single leg	Cruzeiro	2–0	Grêmio	Belo Horizonte
19:45	Arthur (yellow card) 55'; Raniel (yellow card) 74' (goal) 89'; De Arrascaeta 90+3'	Report	Machado (yellow card) 65'	Stadium: Estádio Governador Magalhães Pinto; Attendance: 7,545; Referee: (Brazil) Paulo Roberto Alves Júnior

=== Copa Libertadores ===
==== Group stage ====
===== Group 8 =====
Pos	Team	Pld	W	D	L	GF	GA	GD	Pts	Qualification
1	(Brazil) Grêmio	6	4	1	1	15	6	+9	13	Round of 16
2	(Paraguay) Guaraní	6	3	2	1	9	7	+2	11	Round of 16
3	(Chile) Deportes Iquique	6	3	1	2	12	9	+3	10	Copa Sudamericana
4	(Venezuela) Zamora	6	0	0	6	6	20	−14	0	

Source: CONMEBOL

===== Matches =====
9 March 1	Zamora (Venezuela)	0–2	(Brazil) Grêmio	Barinas, Venezuela
19:30 UTC−03:00	Ovalle (yellow card) 50'; Vargas (yellow card) 53'	Report	Moura 45+1'; Luan 52' (pen.)	Stadium: Agustín Tovar; Attendance: 12,000; Referee: Darío Herrera (Argentina)

11 April 2	Grêmio (Brazil)	3–2	(Chile) Deportes Iquique	Porto Alegre, Brazil
21:45 UTC−03:00	Luan 16', 24'; Bolaños 29' (pen.), (yellow card) 69'; M. Oliveira (yellow card) 42'; Ramiro (yellow card) 82'	Report	Caroca 61', (yellow card) 72'; Lopes (yellow card) 67'; Dávila 68'; Zenteno (yellow card) 69'; Charles (yellow card) 79'; Bustamante (yellow card) 90+4'	Stadium: Arena do Grêmio; Attendance: 30,343; Referee: Esteban Ostojich (Uruguay)

20 April 3	Guaraní (Paraguay)	1–1	(Brazil) Grêmio	Asunción, Paraguay
19:30 UTC−03:00	López 71'	Report	Michel (yellow card) 54' (yellow-red card) 60'; Bressan (yellow card) 69'; Rocha (yellow card) 76', (goal) 79'; Grohe (yellow card) 90+2'	Stadium: Defensores del Chaco; Attendance: 9,000; Referee: Wilmar Roldán (Colombia)

27 April 4	Grêmio (Brazil)	4–1	(Paraguay) Guaraní	Porto Alegre, Brazil
21:45 UTC−03:00	Barrios 8', 28', 79', (yellow card) 45+2'; Arthur (yellow card) 45+1'; Geromel 45+4'	Report	Moura 34' (o.g.); Bartomeus (yellow card) 41'; Pittoni (yellow card) 44'; Camacho (red card) 45+1'	Stadium: Arena do Grêmio; Attendance: 21,300; Referee: Patricio Loustau (Argentina)

3 May 5	Deportes Iquique (Chile)	2–1	(Brazil) Grêmio	Iquique, Chile
19:30 UTC−03:00	Bielkiewicz 24' (pen.); Torres 49'; Moreno (yellow card) 54'	Report	Barrios 20'; Ramiro (yellow card) 23' (yellow-red card) 90+1'; Kannemann (yellow card) 26'; Rocha (yellow card) 47'; Geromel (yellow card) 67'; Grohe (yellow card) 90+3'	Stadium: Tierra de Campeones; Attendance: 3,000; Referee: Germán Delfino (Argentina)

25 May 6	Grêmio (Brazil)	4–0	(Venezuela) Zamora	Porto Alegre, Brazil
21:45 UTC−03:00	Luan 23', 29' (pen.); Barrios 26'; Rocha 64'	Report	O. Hernández (yellow card) 46'; Pinto (yellow card) 79'	Stadium: Arena do Grêmio; Attendance: 22,435; Referee: Juan Albarracín (Ecuador)

==== Final stage ====
===== Matches =====
====== Round of 16 ======
4 July First leg	Godoy Cruz (Argentina)	0–1	(Brazil) Grêmio	Mendoza
19:15	Abecasis (yellow card) 13'; Ángel Gonzalez (yellow card) 17'; Fabián Henríquez (yellow card) 19'; Javier Correa (yellow card) 84'	Report	Ramiro 1'; Marcelo Grohe (yellow card) 39'	Stadium: Estadio Malvinas Argentinas; Referee: (Peru) Víctor Carrillo

9 August Second leg	Grêmio (Brazil)	2–1 (3–1 agg.)	(Argentina) Godoy Cruz	Porto Alegre
19:15	Pedro Rocha 29' 59'; Michel (yellow card) 42' (yellow-red card); Maicon (yellow card) 57'; Fernandinho (yellow card) 87'	Report	Javier Correa 14'; Abecasis (yellow card) 25'; Galeano (yellow card) 39'; Fabián Henríquez (yellow card) 53'; Sebastián Olivarez (yellow card) 87'	Stadium: Arena do Grêmio; Referee: (Paraguay) Enrique Cáceres

=== Quarter-finals ===
13 September First leg	Botafogo (Brazil)	0–0	(Brazil) Grêmio	Rio de Janeiro
21:45	Rodrigo Pimpão (yellow card) 44'; Matheus Fernandes (yellow card) 81'	Report		Stadium: Estádio Olímpico Nilton Santos; Referee: (Venezuela) José Argote

20 September Second leg	Grêmio (Brazil)	1–0 (1–0 agg.)	(Brazil) Botafogo	Porto Alegre
21:45	Pedro Geromel (yellow card) 32'; Barrios 63'; Kannemann (yellow card) 72'; Bruno Cortez (yellow card) 80'; Edílson (yellow card) 90+5'	Report	Igor Rabello (yellow card) 27'; João Paulo Mior (yellow card) 36'; Rodrigo Lindoso (yellow card) 68'; Roger (yellow card) 72'; Guilherme (yellow card) 90+5'	Stadium: Arena do Grêmio; Referee: (Argentina) Patricio Loustau

=== Semi-finals ===
25 October First leg	Barcelona (Ecuador)	0–3	(Brazil) Grêmio	Guayaquil
21:45	Caicedo (yellow card) 63'	Report	Luan 8' 51'; Edílson 21'; Barrios (yellow card) 43'	Stadium: Estadio Monumental Isidro Romero Carbo; Referee: (Argentina) Néstor Pitana

1 November Second leg	Grêmio (Brazil)	0–1 (3–1 agg.)	(Ecuador) Barcelona	Porto Alegre
21:45	Edílson (yellow card) 58'; Kannemann (yellow card) 77'	Report	Esterilla (yellow card) 26'; Álvez 33' (red card) 90+5'; Xavier Arreaga (yellow card) 76'; Oyola (yellow card) 88'; Velasco (yellow card) 89'	Stadium: Arena do Grêmio; Referee: (Chile) Roberto Tobar

=== Final ===
22 November First leg	Grêmio (Brazil)	1–0	(Argentina) Lanús	Porto Alegre
21:45	Cícero 83'	Report		Stadium: Arena do Grêmio; Attendance: 55,188; Referee: Julio Bascuñán

29 November Second leg	Lanús (Argentina)	1–2 (1–3 agg.)	(Brazil) Grêmio	Lanús
21:45	José Sand 72'	Report	Fernandinho 27'; Luan 42'	Stadium: Estadio Ciudad de Lanús – Néstor Díaz Pérez; Referee: Enrique Cáceres

=== Campeonato Brasileiro Série A ===
==== League table ====
Pos	Team	Pld	W	D	L	GF	GA	GD	Pts	Qualification or relegation
2	Palmeiras	38	19	6	13	61	45	+16	63	Qualification for Copa Libertadores group stage
3	Santos	38	17	12	9	42	32	+10	63	Qualification for Copa Libertadores group stage
4	Grêmio	38	18	8	12	55	36	+19	62	Qualification for Copa Libertadores group stage
5	Cruzeiro	38	15	12	11	47	39	+8	57	Qualification for Copa Libertadores group stage
6	Flamengo	38	15	11	12	49	38	+11	56	Qualification for Copa Libertadores group stage

Source: CBF
Rules for classification: 1) points; 2) wins; 3) goal difference; 4) goals scored; 5) head-to-head results; 6) least red cards received; 7) least yellow cards received; 8) draw.

==== Matches ====
14 May 1	Grêmio	2–0	Botafogo	Porto Alegre
19:00 UTC−03:00	Ramiro 45+1', 54'; M. Oliveira (yellow card) 69'	Report	Conceição (yellow card) 28'; B. Silva (yellow card) 60'; Pimpão (yellow card) 60'; Santos (yellow card) 63'; João Paulo (yellow card) 90+5'	Stadium: Arena do Grêmio; Attendance: 20,289; Referee: Bráulio Machado

21 May 2	Atlético Paranaense	0–2	Grêmio	Curitiba
16:00 UTC−03:00	Heleno (yellow card) 8'; Weverton (yellow card) 23'	Report	Barrios (yellow card) 24', (goal) 59'; Ramiro (yellow card) 32'; Luan 46'; Grohe (yellow card) 68' (yellow-red card) 75'; Arthur (yellow card) 76'	Stadium: Arena da Baixada; Attendance: 17,244; Referee: Marcelo Souza

28 May 3	Sport Recife	4–3	Grêmio	Recife
18:00 UTC−03:00		Report		Stadium: Ilha do Retiro

4 June 4	Grêmio	2–0	Vasco da Gama	Porto Alegre
16:00 UTC−03:00		Report		Stadium: Arena do Grêmio

8 June 5	Chapecoense	3–6	Grêmio	Chapecó
20:00 UTC−03:00		Report		Stadium: Arena Condá

12 June 6	Grêmio	1–0	Bahia	Porto Alegre
20:00 UTC−03:00		Report		Stadium: Arena do Grêmio

15 June 7	Fluminense	0–2	Grêmio	Rio de Janeiro
21:00 UTC−03:00		Report		Stadium: Maracanã

19 June 8	Cruzeiro	3–3	Grêmio	Belo Horizonte
20:00 UTC−03:00		Report		Stadium: Mineirão

22 June 9	Grêmio	2–0	Coritiba	Porto Alegre
21:00 UTC−03:00		Report		Stadium: Arena do Grêmio

25 June 10	Grêmio	0–1	Corinthians	Porto Alegre
16:00 UTC−03:00		Report		Stadium: Arena do Grêmio

1 July 11	Palmeiras	1–0	Grêmio	São Paulo
16:00 UTC−03:00				Stadium: Pacaembu

9 July 12	Grêmio	0–2	Avaí	Porto Alegre
16:00 UTC−03:00				Stadium: Arena do Grêmio

13 July 13	Flamengo	0–1	Grêmio	Rio de Janeiro
19:30 UTC−03:00				Stadium: Luso-Brasileiro

16 July 14	Grêmio	3–1	Ponte Preta	Porto Alegre
16:00 UTC−03:00				Stadium: Arena do Grêmio

19 July 15	Vitória	1–3	Grêmio	Salvador
19:30 UTC−03:00				Stadium: Barradão

24 July 16	São Paulo	1–1	Grêmio	São Paulo
20:00 UTC−03:00				Stadium: Morumbi

30 July 17	Grêmio	1–1	Santos	Porto Alegre
19:00 UTC−03:00				Stadium: Arena do Grêmio

2 August 18	Atlético Goianiense	0–1	Grêmio	Goiânia
21:45 UTC−03:00				Stadium: Olímpico Pedro Ludovico

6 August 19	Grêmio	2–0	Atlético Mineiro	Porto Alegre
16:00 UTC−03:00				Stadium: Arena do Grêmio

13 August 20	Botafogo	1–0	Grêmio	Rio de Janeiro
19:00 UTC−03:00				Stadium: Olímpico Nilton Santos

20 August 21	Grêmio	0–0	Atlético Paranaense	Porto Alegre
11:00 UTC−03:00				Stadium: Arena do Grêmio

2 September 22	Grêmio	5–0	Sport	Porto Alegre
16:00 UTC−03:00				Stadium: Arena do Grêmio

9 September 23	Vasco	1–0	Grêmio	Rio de Janeiro
18:00 UTC−03:00				Stadium: São Januário

17 September 24	Grêmio	0–1	Chapecoense	Porto Alegre
16:00 UTC−03:00				Stadium: Arena do Grêmio

24 September 25	Bahia	1–0	Grêmio	Salvador
19:00 UTC−03:00				Stadium: Arena Fonte Nova

1 October 26	Grêmio	1–0	Fluminense	Porto Alegre
16:00 UTC−03:00				Stadium: Arena do Grêmio

11 October 27	Grêmio	0–1	Cruzeiro	Porto Alegre
21:45 UTC−03:00				Stadium: Arena do Grêmio

15 October 28	Coritiba	0–1	Grêmio	Curitiba
19:00 UTC−03:00				Stadium: Couto Pereira

18 October 29	Corinthians	0–0	Grêmio	São Paulo
21:45 UTC−03:00				Stadium: Arena Corinthians

22 October 30	Grêmio	1–3	Palmeiras	Porto Alegre
17:00 UTC−03:00				Stadium: Arena do Grêmio

29 October 31	Avaí	2–2	Grêmio	Florianópolis
19:00 UTC−03:00				Stadium: Ressacada

5 November 32	Grêmio	3–1	Flamengo	Porto Alegre
17:00 UTC−03:00				Stadium: Arena do Grêmio

8 November 33	Ponte Preta	0–1	Grêmio	Campinas
19:30 UTC−03:00				Stadium: Moisés Lucarelli

12 November 34	Grêmio	1–1	Vitória	Porto Alegre
17:00 UTC−03:00				Stadium: Arena do Grêmio

12 November 35	Grêmio	1–0	São Paulo	Porto Alegre
17:00 UTC−03:00				Stadium: Arena do Grêmio

19 November 36	Santos	1–0	Grêmio	Santos
19:00 UTC−03:00				Stadium: Vila Belmiro

26 November 37	Grêmio	1–1	Atlético Goianiense	Porto Alegre
17:00 UTC−03:00				Stadium: Arena do Grêmio

3 December 38	Atlético Mineiro	4–3	Grêmio	Belo Horizonte
17:00 UTC−03:00				Stadium: Independência

=== Copa do Brasil ===
==== Matches ====
===== Round of 16 =====
17 May First leg	Grêmio	3–1	Fluminense	Porto Alegre
21:45 UTC−03:00	Arthur 18'; Barrios 65', 71'; Fernandinho (yellow card) 90+2'	Report	Chaves 5'; Dourado (yellow card) 67'; Scarpa (yellow card) 81'; Sornoza (yellow card) 87'; Wendel (yellow card) 89'; Renato (yellow card) 90'; Henrique (yellow card) 90+4'	Stadium: Arena do Grêmio; Attendance: 22,788; Referee: Dewson Freitas

31 May Second leg	Fluminense	0–2 (1–5 agg.)	Grêmio	Rio de Janeiro
19:30 UTC−03:00	Nogueira (red card) 5'; Henrique (yellow card) 67'; Henrique Dourado (yellow card) 84'; Richarlison (yellow card) 88'	Report	Luan 18'; Pedro Rocha 29'; Kannemann (yellow card) 45+1'; Rafael Thyere (yellow card) 65'; Ramiro (yellow card) 90+1'	Stadium: Maracanã; Attendance: 21,172; Referee: (Brazil) Thiago Duarte Peixoto

=== Quarter-finals ===
28 June First leg	Grêmio	4–0	Atlético Paranaense	Porto Alegre
19:30 UTC−03:00	Barrios 23' 30'; Kannemann 33'; Michel (yellow card) 42'; Everton 87'	Report	Deivid (yellow card) 25'; Nikão (yellow card) 45+1' (yellow-red card); Wanderson (yellow card) 55'; Carlos Alberto (yellow card) 67'	Stadium: Arena do Grêmio; Attendance: 25,738; Referee: (Brazil) Flavio Rodrigues De Souza

27 July Second leg	Atlético Paranaense	2–3 (2–7 agg.)	Grêmio	Curitiba
21:45 UTC−03:00				Stadium: Arena da Baixada

=== Semi-finals ===
16 August First leg	Grêmio	1–0	Cruzeiro	Porto Alegre
21:45 UTC−03:00				Stadium: Arena do Grêmio

23 August Second leg	Cruzeiro	1–0 (1–1 agg.) (3–2 p)	Grêmio	Belo Horizonte
21:45 UTC−03:00				Stadium: Mineirão

=== FIFA Club World Cup ===
==== Semi-final ====
12 December	Grêmio (Brazil)	1–0 (a.e.t.)	(Mexico) Pachuca	Hazza bin Zayed Stadium, Al Ain
15:00	Everton 95'	Report		Attendance: 6,428; Referee: Felix Brych (Germany)

=== Final ===
16 December	Real Madrid (Spain)	1–0	(Brazil) Grêmio	Zayed Sports City Stadium, Abu Dhabi
15:00	Ronaldo 53'	Report		Attendance: 41,094; Referee: César Arturo Ramos (Mexico)

== Statistics ==
=== Appearances and goals ===
No.	Pos	Nat	Player	Total		Campeonato Brasileiro Série A		Copa do Brasil		Copa Libertadores		Primeira Liga / Campeonato Gaúcho	
No.	Pos	Nat	Player	Apps	Goals	Apps	Goals	Apps	Goals	Apps	Goals	Apps	Goals
Goalkeepers
1	GK	(Brazil) BRA	Marcelo Grohe	21	0	2	0	1	0	6	0	12	0
20	GK	(Brazil) BRA	Léo Jardim	3	0	0+1	0	0	0	0	0	2	0
30	GK	(Brazil) BRA	Bruno Grassi	4	0	0	0	0	0	0	0	4	0
40	GK	(Brazil) BRA	Dida	0	0	0	0	0	0	0	0	0	0
Defenders
2	DF	(Brazil) BRA	Edílson	7	1	0	0	0	0	2	0	5	1
3	DF	(Brazil) BRA	Pedro Geromel	16	1	2	0	1	0	3	1	10	0
4	DF	(Argentina) ARG	Walter Kannemann	21	0	2	0	1	0	5	0	13	0
6	DF	(Brazil) BRA	Leonardo Gomes	5	0	0	0	0	0	0+1	0	4	0
12	DF	(Brazil) BRA	Bruno Cortez	9	0	1+1	0	1	0	2	0	3+1	0
15	DF	(Brazil) BRA	Rafael Thyere	12	0	0+1	0	0	0	3	0	7+1	0
22	DF	(Brazil) BRA	Bressan	4	0	0	0	0	0	1	0	3	0
26	DF	(Brazil) BRA	Marcelo Oliveira	19	0	1	0	0	0	4	0	14	0
33	DF	(Brazil) BRA	Bruno Rodrigo	1	0	0	0	0	0	0	0	1	0
88	DF	(Brazil) BRA	Léo Moura	21	3	2	0	1	0	5	1	13	2
—	DF	(Brazil) BRA	Gabriel Blos	0	0	0	0	0	0	0	0	0	0
Midfielders
5	MF	(Brazil) BRA	Michel	18	1	2	0	1	0	4+1	0	9+1	1
8	MF	(Brazil) BRA	Maicon	8	0	0	0	0	0	1	0	7	0
10	MF	(Argentina) ARG	Gastón Fernández	9	0	0+1	0	0	0	1	0	2+5	0
17	MF	(Brazil) BRA	Ramiro	21	6	2	2	1	0	4	0	14	4
25	MF	(Brazil) BRA	Jailson	18	0	0+2	0	0+1	0	4	0	11	0
27	MF	(Brazil) BRA	Lincoln	12	0	0	0	0	0	1+1	0	1+9	0
28	MF	(Brazil) BRA	Kaio Mendes	2	0	0	0	0	0	0+1	0	1	0
29	MF	(Brazil) BRA	Arthur	13	1	2	0	1	1	2+2	0	2+4	0
35	MF	(Brazil) BRA	Machado	1	0	0	0	0	0	0	0	1	0
—	MF	(Brazil) BRA	Douglas	2	0	0	0	0	0	0	0	2	0
Forwards
7	FW	(Brazil) BRA	Luan	20	9	2	1	1	0	5	5	12	3
9	FW	(Brazil) BRA	Jael	2	0	0	0	0	0	0	0	0+2	0
11	FW	(Brazil) BRA	Everton	18	1	0	0	0+1	0	0+5	0	7+5	1
18	FW	(Paraguay) PAR	Lucas Barrios	17	10	2	1	1	2	4+2	5	2+6	2
19	FW	(Peru) PER	Beto da Silva	0	0	0	0	0	0	0	0	0	0
21	FW	(Brazil) BRA	Fernandinho	17	2	0	0	0+1	0	1+4	0	5+6	2
23	FW	(Ecuador) ECU	Miller Bolaños	16	8	0	0	0	0	3	1	11+2	7
32	FW	(Brazil) BRA	Pedro Rocha	20	3	2	0	1	0	5+1	2	11	1
Players who currently don't integrate the First team squad
24	GK	(Brazil) BRA	Vitor Monteiro	0	0	0	0	0	0	0	0	0	0
13	DF	(Brazil) BRA	Wallace Oliveira	2	0	0	0	0	0	0	0	1+1	0
34	DF	(Brazil) BRA	Iago Silva	1	0	0	0	0	0	0	0	1	0
37	DF	(Brazil) BRA	Lucas Rex	1	1	0	0	0	0	0	0	1	1
44	DF	(Brazil) BRA	Lucas Lovat	0	0	0	0	0	0	0	0	0	0
49	DF	(Brazil) BRA	Guilherme Truyts	0	0	0	0	0	0	0	0	0	0
51	DF	(Brazil) BRA	Zé Augusto	1	0	0	0	0	0	0	0	1	0
14	MF	(Uruguay) URU	Maxi Rodríguez	4	0	0	0	0	0	0	0	0+4	0
41	MF	(Brazil) BRA	Ânderson Balbino	1	0	0	0	0	0	0	0	0+1	0
45	MF	(Brazil) BRA	Lima	1	0	0	0	0	0	0	0	1	0
46	MF	(Brazil) BRA	Jeferson Negueba	1	0	0	0	0	0	0	0	1	0
47	MF	(Brazil) BRA	Rondinelly	1	0	0	0	0	0	0	0	1	0
52	MF	(Brazil) BRA	Jean Pyerre	1	0	0	0	0	0	0	0	0+1	0
36	FW	(South Africa) RSA	Tyroane Sandows	3	0	0	0	0	0	0	0	1+2	0
42	FW	(Brazil) BRA	Luan Viana	0	0	0	0	0	0	0	0	0	0
43	FW	(Brazil) BRA	Lucas Coelho	1	0	0	0	0	0	0	0	1	0
48	FW	(Brazil) BRA	Léo Tilica	1	0	0	0	0	0	0	0	0+1	0
50	FW	(Brazil) BRA	Vico Duarte	0	0	0	0	0	0	0	0	0	0

Last updated: 25 May 2017.
Source: Match reports in Competitions.

=== Goalscorers ===
The list include all goals in competitive matches.

No.	Pos	Nat	Player	Total	Campeonato Brasileiro Série A	Copa do Brasil	Copa Libertadores	Primeira Liga / Campeonato Gaúcho
1	FW	(Paraguay)	Lucas Barrios	10	1	2	5	2
2	FW	(Brazil)	Luan	9	1	0	5	3
3	FW	(Ecuador)	Miller Bolaños	8	0	0	1	7
4	MF	(Brazil)	Ramiro	6	2	0	0	4
5	FW	(Brazil)	Pedro Rocha	3	0	0	2	1
5	DF	(Brazil)	Léo Moura	3	0	0	1	2
7	FW	(Brazil)	Fernandinho	2	0	0	0	2
8	MF	(Brazil)	Arthur	1	0	1	0	0
8	DF	(Brazil)	Pedro Geromel	1	0	0	1	0
8	FW	(Brazil)	Everton	1	0	0	0	1
8	MF	(Brazil)	Michel	1	0	0	0	1
8	DF	(Brazil)	Edílson	1	0	0	0	1
8	DF	(Brazil)	Lucas Rex	1	0	0	0	1
Own goals				0	0	0	0	0
Total				46	4	3	14	25

As of 25 May 2017.
Source: Match reports in Competitions.

=== Assists ===
The list include all assists in competitive matches.

No.	Pos	Nat	Player	Total	Campeonato Brasileiro Série A	Copa do Brasil	Copa Libertadores	Primeira Liga
1	DF	(Argentina)	Walter Kannemann	2	0	1	1	0
1	FW	(Brazil)	Pedro Rocha	2	0	0	2	0
1	MF	(Argentina)	Gastón Fernández	2	0	0	2	0
1	DF	(Brazil)	Léo Moura	2	0	0	2	0
5	FW	(Paraguay)	Lucas Barrios	1	1	0	0	0
5	MF	(Brazil)	Ramiro	1	1	0	0	0
5	DF	(Brazil)	Bruno Cortez	1	0	1	0	0
5	FW	(Brazil)	Luan	1	0	0	1	0
5	FW	(Ecuador)	Miller Bolaños	1	0	0	1	0
5	MF	(Brazil)	Arthur	1	0	0	1	0
5	MF	(Brazil)	Lincoln	1	0	0	1	0
5	DF	(Brazil)	Marcelo Oliveira	1	0	0	1	0
5	DF	(Brazil)	Wallace Oliveira	1	0	0	0	1
Total				17	2	2	12	1

As of 25 May 2017.
Source: Match reports in Competitions.

=== Clean sheets ===
No.	Pos	Nat	Player	Total	Campeonato Brasileiro Série A	Copa do Brasil	Copa Libertadores	Primeira Liga / Campeonato Gaúcho
1	GK	(Brazil)	Marcelo Grohe	10	2	0	2	6
2	GK	(Brazil)	Léo Jardim	1	1	0	0	0
2	GK	(Brazil)	Bruno Grassi	1	0	0	0	1
Total				12	3	0	2	7

As of 25 May 2017.
Source: Match reports in Competitions.
