= 2016 Grêmio FBPA season =

Grêmio
2016 season
- President: Romildo Bolzan Jr.
- Manager: Roger Machado (until 15 September) Renato Portaluppi (since 18 September)
- Stadium: Arena do Grêmio
- Campeonato Brasileiro: 9th
- Copa do Brasil: Winners
- Copa Libertadores: Round of 16
- Primeira Liga: Grupo stage
- Campeonato Gaúcho: Semi-finals
- Top goalscorer: League: Luan (6); All: Luan; Pedro Rocha (12 each)
- Highest home attendance: 17,866 (vs. Flamengo – 22 May)
- Lowest home attendance: 12,415 (vs. Coritiba – 29 May)
- Average home league attendance: 15,141
Home colours	Away colours	Third colours

The 2016 season is Grêmio Foot-Ball Porto Alegrense's 113th season in existence and the club's 11th consecutive season in the top division of Brazilian football. At this season, Grêmio participate in the Campeonato Brasileiro Série A, the Copa Libertadores de América, the Copa do Brasil and the Campeonato Gaúcho.

== Club ==
=== Staff ===
Board members

- President: Romildo Bolzan Jr.
- Vice-president: Adalberto Preis
- Vice-president: Antônio Dutra Júnior
- Vice-president: Cláudio Oderich
- Vice-president: Marcos Herrmann
- Vice-president: Odorico Roman
- Vice-president: Sergei Costa
- Vice-president of football: Alberto Guerra
- Football adviser: Alexandre Rolim
- Director of football: Antônio Dutra Júnior
- Executive of football: Júnior Chávare
- Superintendent: Antônio Carlos Verardi
- Supervisor of football: Marcelo Rudolph

Coaching staff

- Head coach: Roger Machado
- Assistant coach: Roberto Ribas
- Assistant coach: James Freitas
- Fitness coach: Rogério Dias
- Assistant fitness coach: Mário Pereira
- Assistant fitness coach: Gabriel Alves
- Goalkeeper coach: Rogério Godoy
- Performance analyst: Eduardo Cecconi
- Performance analyst: Antônio Cruz
- Performance analyst: Rafael Tavares

Medical staff

- Doctor: Márcio Bolzoni
- Doctor: Felipe do Canto
- Doctor: Paulo Rabaldo
- Doctor: Márcio Dornelles
- Physiologist: José Leandro
- Physiologist: Rafael Gobbato
- Physiotherapist: Henrique Valente
- Physiotherapist: Ingrael do Amaral
- Massagist: Marco Zeilmann
- Massagist: José Flores
- Massagist: Anderson Meurer
- Nurse: Adriano Welter
- Nutritionist: Katiuce Borges

Last updated: 25 May 2016.
Source: Portal Oficial do Grêmio

Other staff

- Press officer: João Paulo Fontoura
- Cameraman: Juares Dagort
- Equipment manager: Marco Severino
- Equipment manager: Danilo Bueno
- Assistant equipment manager: Antônio Marcos
- Butler: Paulo Oliveira
- Chief security: Luiz Fernando Cardoso
- Security: Cristiano Nunes
- Security: Pedro Carvalho
- Security: André Trisch
- Security: Sandro Alegre
- Security: José Nolan
- Caretaker: Moacir da Luz
- Motorist: Valdeci Coelho
- Maintenance technician: Higino Luciano
- Knave: João Brito

=== Kit ===
Supplier: Umbro
Sponsor(s): Banrisul / Unimed

Home	Away	Third

== Squad information ==
=== First team squad ===
Players and informations last updated on 2 June 2016.
Note: Flags indicate national team as has been defined under FIFA eligibility rules. Players may hold more than one non-FIFA nationality.

No.	Name	Nat.	Position(s)	Date of birth (age)	Since	Until	Signed from	Apps	Goals	Notes
Goalkeepers
1	Marcelo Grohe	(Brazil)	GK	13 January 1987 (age 39)	2005	2020	Academy	264	0	National team
20	Douglas Friedrich	(Brazil)	GK	12 December 1988 (age 37)	2016	2016	(Brazil) Corinthians	0	0	On loan
30	Bruno Grassi	(Brazil)	GK	5 March 1987 (age 39)	2015	2017	(Brazil) Cruzeiro-RS	0	0	
40	Léo Jardim	(Brazil)	GK	5 March 1995 (age 31)	2014	2017	Academy	0	0	
—	Tiago Machowski	(Brazil)	GK	16 May 1993 (age 33)	2014	2017	Academy	4	0	
Defenders
3	Pedro Geromel	(Brazil)	CB	21 September 1985 (age 41)	2014	2019	(Germany) FC Köln	31	0	3rd captain
4	Bressan	(Brazil)	CB	15 January 1993 (age 33)	2013	2017	(Brazil) Juventude	60	1	
6	Fred	(Brazil)	CB	15 January 1986 (age 40)	2016	2017	(Brazil) Goiás	0	0	
14	Wallace Reis	(Brazil)	CB	26 December 1987 (age 38)	2016	2019	(Brazil) Flamengo	0	0	
15	Rafael Thyere	(Brazil)	CB	17 May 1993 (age 33)	2013	2017	Academy	4	0	
16	Wesley	(Brazil)	RB / DM	10 February 1995 (age 31)	2015	2016	Academy	0	0	
22	Marcelo Hermes	(Brazil)	LB / LM	1 February 1995 (age 31)	2015	2016	Academy	0	0	
26	Marcelo Oliveira	(Brazil)	LB / DM / CB	29 March 1987 (age 39)	2015	2016	(Brazil) Cruzeiro	8	1	Vice-captain
33	Edílson	(Brazil)	RB	27 July 1986 (age 40)	2016	2019	(Brazil) Corinthians	0	0	
—	Gabriel Blos	(Brazil)	CB	28 February 1989 (age 37)	2013	2019	(Brazil) Lajeadense	11	0	Source
Midfielders
5	Walace	(Brazil)	DM	4 April 1995 (age 31)	2014	2018	Academy	20	0	National team
8	Giuliano	(Brazil)	AM / RM	31 May 1990 (age 36)	2014	2018	(Ukraine) Dnipro Dnipropetrovsk	18	1	
10	Douglas	(Brazil)	AM	18 February 1982 (age 44)	2015	2016	(Brazil) Monte Azul	112	24	On loan
12	Edinho	(Brazil)	DM / CB	15 January 1983 (age 43)	2014	2017	(Brazil) Fluminense	18	0	
17	Ramiro	(Brazil)	DM / RB / CM	22 May 1993 (age 33)	2013	2016	(Brazil) Juventude	82	4	
19	Maicon	(Brazil)	CM / AM	14 September 1985 (age 41)	2015	2019	(Brazil) São Paulo	0	0	Captain
21	Felipe Tontini	(Brazil)	AM	16 July 1995 (age 31)	2015	2018	Academy	0	0	
27	Lincoln	(Brazil)	AM / LM	7 November 1998 (age 28)	2015	2019	Academy	0	0	
28	Kaio Mendes	(Brazil)	DM / LB	18 March 1995 (age 31)	2015	2017	Academy	0	0	
37	Moisés Wolschick	(Brazil)	DM / CM / RB	24 September 1994 (age 32)	2015	2016	Academy	0	0	
Forwards
7	Luan	(Brazil)	LW / ST / AM / LM	27 March 1993 (age 33)	2014	2018	Academy	55	9	National team
9	Braian Rodríguez	(Uruguay)	ST	14 August 1986 (age 40)	2015	2016	(Spain) Real Betis	0	0	On loan
11	Everton	(Brazil)	LW	28 March 1996 (age 30)	2014	2018	Academy	21	3	
13	Bobô	(Brazil)	ST	9 January 1985 (age 41)	2015	2016	(Turkey) Kayserispor	3	1	
23	Miller Bolaños	(Ecuador)	AM / ST / RM / LM	1 June 1990 (age 36)	2016	2019	(Ecuador) Emelec	8	2	National team
24	Matheus Batista	(Brazil)	ST	16 June 1995 (age 31)	2015	2019	Academy	0	0	
32	Pedro Rocha	(Brazil)	LW / RW / ST	1 October 1994 (age 32)	2015	2017	Academy	3	1	
91	Henrique Almeida	(Brazil)	SS / ST	27 May 1991 (age 35)	2016	2019	(Brazil) Botafogo	0	0	

=== Starting XI ===
4–2–3–1 Formation

According to the most recent line-ups, not most used players (in Notes).

No.	Pos.	Nat.	Name	MS	Notes
1	GK	(Brazil)	Marcelo Grohe	27	
33	DF	(Brazil)	Edílson	4	Wallace Oliveira has 12 starts.
3	DF	(Brazil)	Pedro Geromel	24	
6	DF	(Brazil)	Fred	23	
26	DF	(Brazil)	Marcelo Oliveira	20	
5	MF	(Brazil)	Walace	18	
19	MF	(Brazil)	Maicon (captain)	25	
8	MF	(Brazil)	Giuliano	21	
10	MF	(Brazil)	Douglas	23	
23	MF	(Ecuador)	Miller Bolaños	7	Bobô has 14 starts.
7	FW	(Brazil)	Luan	25	

Last updated: 5 June 2016.
Source: Squad statistics and Start formations
Only competitive matches.
Using the most used start formation.
Ordered by position on pitch (from back right to front left).

== Friendlies ==
=== Pre-season ===
23 January Friendly	Grêmio (Brazil)	1–1	(Uruguay) Danubio	Porto Alegre, Brazil
17:00 UTC−02:00	Everton 57'	Report	Kadu 68' (o.g.)	Stadium: Arena do Grêmio; Attendance: 14,504

== Competitions ==
=== Overview ===
Competition	First match	Last match	Starting round	Final position	Record							
Competition	First match	Last match	Starting round	Final position	Pld	W	D	L	GF	GA	GD	Win %
Série A	15 May 2016	11 December 2016	Matchday 1	9th	38	14	11	13	41	44	−3	36.84
Copa do Brasil	24 August 2016	7 December 2016	Round of 16	Winners	8	4	3	1	10	5	+5	50.00
Campeonato Gaúcho	31 January 2016	24 April 2016	Matchday 1	Semi-finals	16	11	2	3	36	18	+18	68.75
Primeira Liga	28 January 2016	6 March 2016	Group stage	Group stage	3	1	2	0	3	2	+1	33.33
Copa Libertadores	17 February 2016	5 May 2016	Group stage	Round of 16	8	3	2	3	10	10	+0	37.50
Total					73	33	20	20	100	79	+21	45.21

Source: Competitions

=== Campeonato Gaúcho ===
==== Matches ====
31 January 1	Brasil de Pelotas	1–3	Grêmio	Caxias do Sul
				Stadium: Centenário

4 February 2	Grêmio	3–1	Aimoré	Novo Hamburgo
				Stadium: Estádio do Vale

10 February 3	Veranópolis	0–1	Grêmio	Veranópolis
				Stadium: Estádio Antônio David Farina

12 February 4	Grêmio	0–2	São José-PA	Porto Alegre
				Stadium: Arena do Grêmio

21 February 5	Grêmio	1–0	Novo Hamburgo	Porto Alegre
				Stadium: Arena do Grêmio

24 February 6	São Paulo	3–2	Grêmio	Rio Grande
				Stadium: Estádio Aldo Dapuzzo

27 February 7	Grêmio	4–2	Glória	Porto Alegre
				Stadium: Arena do Grêmio

6 March 8	Grêmio	0–0	Internacional	Porto Alegre
				Stadium: Arena do Grêmio

12 March 9	Cruzeiro	1–3	Grêmio	Novo Hamburgo
				Stadium: Estádio do Vale

20 March 10	Ypiranga	1–2	Grêmio	Erechim
				Stadium: Estádio Olímpico Colosso da Lagoa

27 March 11	Grêmio	3–0	Lajeadense	Porto Alegre
				Stadium: Arena do Grêmio

30 March 12	Passo Fundo	1–5	Grêmio	Erechim
				Stadium: Estádio Vermelhão da Serra

3 April 13	Grêmio	2–2	Juventude	Porto Alegre
				Stadium: Arena do Grêmio

=== Quarter-finals ===
6 April	Grêmio	4–1	Brasil de Pelotas	Porto Alegre
				Stadium: Arena do Grêmio

=== Semi-finals ===
21 April First leg	Juventude	2–0	Grêmio	Caxias do Sul
				Stadium: Estádio Alfredo Jaconi

24 April Second leg	Grêmio	3–1 (3–a3 agg.)	Juventude	Porto Alegre
				Stadium: Arena do Grêmio

=== Primeira Liga ===
==== Group stage ====
===== Group B =====
Pos	Team	Pld	W	D	L	GF	GA	GD	Pts	Qualification
1	Internacional	3	1	2	0	3	0	+3	5	Qualifies to the Final stage
2	Grêmio	3	1	2	0	3	2	+1	5	
3	Coritiba	3	1	1	1	3	1	+2	4	
4	Avaí	3	0	1	2	2	8	−6	1	

===== Matches =====
28 January 1	Avaí	2–2	Grêmio	Chapecó
				Stadium: Arena Condá

7 February 2	Grêmio	1–0	Coritiba	Porto Alegre
				Stadium: Arena do Grêmio

6 March 8	Grêmio	0–0	Internacional	Porto Alegre
				Stadium: Arena do Grêmio

=== Copa Libertadores ===
==== Group stage ====
===== Group 6 =====
Pos	Team	Pld	W	D	L	GF	GA	GD	Pts	Qualification
1	(Mexico) Toluca (A)	6	4	1	1	9	5	+4	13	Final stages
2	(Brazil) Grêmio (A)	6	3	2	1	10	6	+4	11	Final stages
3	(Argentina) San Lorenzo	6	0	4	2	5	8	−3	4	
4	(Ecuador) LDU Quito	6	1	1	4	7	12	−5	4	

Source: CONMEBOL
Rules for classification: 1) points; 2) goal difference; 3) goals scored; 4) away goals scored; 5) drawing of lots.
(A) Advanced to the round of 16

===== Matches =====
17 February 1	Toluca (Mexico)	2–0	(Brazil) Grêmio	Toluca, Mexico
23:00 UTC−03:00				Stadium: Estadio Nemesio Díez

2 March 2	Grêmio (Brazil)	4–0	(Ecuador) LDU Quito	Porto Alegre, Brazil
21:45 UTC−03:00				Stadium: Arena do Grêmio

9 March 3	Grêmio (Brazil)	1–1	(Argentina) San Lorenzo	Porto Alegre, Brazil
21:45 UTC−03:00				Stadium: Arena do Grêmio

15 March 4	San Lorenzo (Argentina)	1–1	(Brazil) Grêmio	Buenos Aires, Argentina
21:45 UTC−03:00				Stadium: Estadio Pedro Bidegain

13 April 5	LDU Quito (Ecuador)	2–3	(Brazil) Grêmio	Quito, Ecuador
21:45 UTC−03:00				Stadium: Estadio de Liga Deportiva Universitaria

19 April 6	Grêmio (Brazil)	1–0	(Mexico) Toluca	Porto Alegre, Brazil
21:45 UTC−03:00				Stadium: Arena do Grêmio

==== Final stage ====
===== Matches =====
====== Round of 16 ======
27 April First leg	Grêmio (Brazil)	0–1	(Argentina) Rosario Central	Porto Alegre, Brazil
21:45				Stadium: Arena do Grêmio

5 May Second leg	Rosario Central (Argentina)	3–0 (4–0 agg.)	(Brazil) Grêmio	Rosario, Argentina
19:15				Stadium: Estadio Gigante de Arroyito

=== Campeonato Brasileiro ===
==== League table ====
Pos	Team	Pld	W	D	L	GF	GA	GD	Pts	Qualification or relegation
7	Corinthians	38	15	10	13	48	42	+6	55	Qualification for 2017 Copa Sudamericana
8	Ponte Preta	38	15	8	15	48	52	−4	53	Qualification for 2017 Copa Sudamericana
9	Grêmio	38	14	11	13	41	44	−3	53	Qualification for 2017 Copa Libertadores group stage
10	São Paulo	38	14	10	14	44	36	+8	52	Qualification for 2017 Copa Sudamericana
11	Chapecoense	38	13	13	12	49	56	−7	52 (Note: The matchday 38 game between Chapecoense and Atlético Mineiro was cancelled after both teams declined to play following the Chapecoense team plane crash. Both teams received a double walkover (3–0 loss for each team).)	Qualification for 2017 Copa Libertadores group stage

Source: CBF
Rules for classification: 1) points; 2) wins; 3) goal difference; 4) goals scored; 5) head-to-head results; 6) least red cards received; 7) least yellow cards received; 8) draw.

==== Matches ====
15 May 1	Corinthians	0–0	Grêmio	São Paulo
16:00 UTC−03:00	Balbuena (yellow card) 73'	Report	Bobô (yellow card) 68'; Edinho (yellow card) 88'; Grohe (yellow card) 89'; Almeida (yellow card) 90+3'	Stadium: Arena Corinthians; Attendance: 31,905; Referee: Wilton Sampaio

22 May 2	Grêmio	1–0	Flamengo	Porto Alegre
16:00 UTC−03:00	Fred 54', (yellow card) 63'; Luan (yellow card) 56'; Maicon (yellow card) 90+4'	Report	Guerrero (yellow card) 9'; Éverton (yellow card) 37'	Stadium: Arena do Grêmio; Attendance: 17,866; Referee: Luiz Flávio de Oliveira

26 May 3	Atlético Mineiro	0–3	Grêmio	Belo Horizonte
21:00 UTC−03:00	Pablo (yellow card) 75'	Report	Marcelo Oliveira 18', (yellow card) 34'; Luan 26', 45+3', (yellow card) 44'; Douglas (yellow card) 50'; Hermes (yellow card) 70'; Maicon (yellow card) 84'	Stadium: Independência; Attendance: 17,426; Referee: Raphael Claus

29 May 4	Grêmio	2–0	Coritiba	Porto Alegre
18:30 UTC−03:00	Everton 40'; Luan 68' (pen.)	Report	Kléber (yellow card) 12'; Rafael Marques (yellow card) 22'; Juninho (yellow card) 67'	Stadium: Arena do Grêmio; Attendance: 12,415; Referee: Sandro Ricci

2 June 5	Palmeiras	4–3	Grêmio	São Paulo
21:00 UTC−03:00	Jesus 2'; Sales (yellow card) 20'; Dudu (yellow card) 23'; Guedes 57'; Vitor Hugo (yellow card) 42', (goal) 73'; Prass (yellow card) 75'; Santos 84'; Fabrício (yellow card) 88'	Report	Hermes (yellow card) 40'; Giuliano 45+5', 55'; Grassi (yellow card) 68'; Geromel (yellow card) 71'; Lincoln (yellow card) 83'; Edílson 90+1'	Stadium: Pacaembu; Attendance: 19,196; Referee: Marielson Alves

5 June 6	Grêmio	1–0	Ponte Preta	Porto Alegre
16:00 UTC−03:00				Stadium: Arena do Grêmio

11 June 7	Grêmio	1–1	Fluminense	Rio de Janeiro
18:30 UTC−03:00				Stadium: Raulino de Oliveira

15 June 8	Chapecoense	3–3	Grêmio	Chapecó
19:30 UTC−03:00				Stadium: Arena Condá

19 June 9	Grêmio	2–0	Cruzeiro	Porto Alegre
19:00 UTC−03:00				Stadium: Arena do Grêmio

23 June 10	Grêmio	1–2	Vitória	Porto Alegre
19:15 UTC−03:00				Stadium: Arena do Grêmio

26 June 11	Atlético Paranaense	2–0	Grêmio	Curitiba
16:00 UTC−03:00				Stadium: Arena da Baixada

29 June 12	Grêmio	3–2	Santos	Porto Alegre
19:30 UTC−03:00				Stadium: Arena do Grêmio

3 July 13	Internacional	0–1	Grêmio	Porto Alegre
11:00 UTC−03:00				Stadium: Estádio Beira-Rio

10 July 14	Grêmio	2–1	Figueirense	Porto Alegre
11:00 UTC−03:00				Stadium: Arena do Grêmio

17 July 15	Sport Recife	4–2	Grêmio	Recife
18:30 UTC−03:00				Stadium: Ilha do Retiro

24 July 16	Grêmio	1–0	São Paulo	Porto Alegre
16:00 UTC−03:00				Stadium: Arena do Grêmio

31 July 17	América Mineiro	0–0	Grêmio	Belo Horizonte
18:30 UTC−03:00				Stadium: Independência

4 August 18	Grêmio	0–0	Santa Cruz	Porto Alegre
19:30 UTC−03:00				Stadium: Arena do Grêmio

14 August 20	Grêmio	3–0	Corinthians	Porto Alegre
11:00 UTC−03:00				Stadium: Arena do Grêmio

21 August 21	Flamengo	2–1	Grêmio	Brasília
11:00 UTC−03:00				Stadium: Mané Garrincha

28 August 22	Grêmio	1–1	Atlético Mineiro	Porto Alegre
16:00 UTC−03:00				Stadium: Arena do Grêmio

4 September 19	Botafogo	2–1	Grêmio	Rio de Janeiro
16:00 UTC−03:00				Stadium: Luso-Brasileiro

7 September 23	Coritiba	4–0	Grêmio	Curitiba
21:45 UTC−03:00				Stadium: Couto Pereira

11 September 24	Grêmio	0–0	Palmeiras	Porto Alegre
18:30 UTC−03:00				Stadium: Arena do Grêmio

14 September 25	Ponte Preta	3–0	Grêmio	Campinas
21:00 UTC−03:00				Stadium: Moisés Lucarelli

18 September 26	Grêmio	0–1	Fluminense	Porto Alegre
16:00 UTC−03:00				Stadium: Arena do Grêmio

25 September 27	Grêmio	1–0	Chapecoense	Porto Alegre
16:00 UTC−03:00				Stadium: Arena do Grêmio

1 October 28	Cruzeiro	1–0	Grêmio	Belo Horizonte
18:30 UTC−03:00				Stadium: Mineirão

5 October 29	Vitória	0–1	Grêmio	Salvador
19:30 UTC−03:00				Stadium: Arena Fonte Nova

13 October 30	Grêmio	1–0	Atlético Paranaense	Porto Alegre
21:00 UTC−03:00				Stadium: Arena do Grêmio

16 October 31	Santos	1–1	Grêmio	Santos
19:30 UTC−03:00				Stadium: Vila Belmiro

23 October 32	Grêmio	0–0	Internacional	Porto Alegre
17:00 UTC−03:00				Stadium: Arena do Grêmio

29 October 33	Figueirense	0–0	Grêmio	Florianópolis
19:30 UTC−03:00				Stadium: Orlando Scarpelli

7 November 34	Grêmio	0–3	Sport	Porto Alegre
20:00 UTC−03:00				Stadium: Arena do Grêmio

17 November 35	São Paulo	1–1	Grêmio	São Paulo
19:30 UTC−03:00				Stadium: Morumbi

20 November 36	Grêmio	3–0	América Mineiro	Porto Alegre
17:00 UTC−03:00				Stadium: Arena do Grêmio

27 November 37	Santa Cruz	5–1	Grêmio	Recife
19:30 UTC−03:00				Stadium: Arruda

11 December 38	Grêmio	0–1	Botafogo	Porto Alegre
17:00 UTC−03:00				Stadium: Arena do Grêmio

=== Round of 16 ===
24 August First leg	Atlético Paranaense	0–1	Grêmio	Curitiba
19:30 UTC−03:00				Stadium: Arena da Baixada

21 September Second leg	Grêmio	0–1 (1–1 agg.) (4–3 p)	Atlético Paranaense	Porto Alegre
19:30 UTC−03:00				Stadium: Arena do Grêmio

=== Quarter-finals ===
28 September First leg	Grêmio	2–1	Palmeiras	Porto Alegre
21:45 UTC−03:00				Stadium: Arena do Grêmio

19 October Second leg	Palmeiras	1–1 (2–3 agg.)	Grêmio	São Paulo
21:45 UTC−03:00				Stadium: Allianz Parque

=== Semi-finals ===
26 October First leg	Cruzeiro	0–2	Grêmio	Belo Horizonte
21:45 UTC−03:00				Stadium: Mineirão

2 November Second leg	Grêmio	0–0 (2–0 agg.)	Cruzeiro	Porto Alegre
21:45 UTC−03:00				Stadium: Arena do Grêmio

=== Final ===
23 November First leg	Atlético Mineiro	1–3	Grêmio	Belo Horizonte
21:45 UTC−03:00				Stadium: Mineirão

7 December Second leg	Grêmio	1–1 (4–2 agg.)	Atlético Mineiro	Porto Alegre
21:45 UTC−03:00				Stadium: Arena do Grêmio

== Statistics ==
=== Appearances and goals ===
No.	Pos	Nat	Player	Total		Campeonato Brasileiro		Copa do Brasil		Copa Libertadores de América		Primeira Liga / Campeonato Gaúcho	
No.	Pos	Nat	Player	Apps	Goals	Apps	Goals	Apps	Goals	Apps	Goals	Apps	Goals
Goalkeepers
1	GK	(Brazil) BRA	Marcelo Grohe	27	0	4	0	0	0	8	0	15	0
20	GK	(Brazil) BRA	Léo Jardim	0	0	0	0	0	0	0	0	0	0
30	GK	(Brazil) BRA	Bruno Grassi	5	0	1	0	0	0	0	0	4	0
40	GK	(Brazil) BRA	Douglas Friedrich	0	0	0	0	0	0	0	0	0	0
—	GK	(Brazil) BRA	Tiago Machowski	0	0	0	0	0	0	0	0	0	0
Defenders
2	DF	(Brazil) BRA	Wallace Oliveira	12	0	0	0	0	0	3	0	9	0
3	DF	(Brazil) BRA	Pedro Geromel	24	2	5	0	0	0	7	0	12	2
4	DF	(Brazil) BRA	Bressan	13	1	2+1	0	0	0	1+2	0	7	1
6	DF	(Brazil) BRA	Fred	23	3	3	1	0	0	8	1	12	1
14	DF	(Brazil) BRA	Wallace Reis	0	0	0	0	0	0	0	0	0	0
15	DF	(Brazil) BRA	Rafael Thyere	3	0	0	0	0	0	0	0	3	0
16	DF	(Brazil) BRA	Wesley	6	0	0	0	0	0	1	0	5	0
22	DF	(Brazil) BRA	Marcelo Hermes	14	0	2+1	0	0	0	2+1	0	8	0
26	DF	(Brazil) BRA	Marcelo Oliveira	20	1	3	1	0	0	6	0	11	0
33	DF	(Brazil) BRA	Edílson	4	1	4	1	0	0	0	0	0	0
—	DF	(Brazil) BRA	Gabriel Blos	0	0	0	0	0	0	0	0	0	0
Midfielders
5	MF	(Brazil) BRA	Walace	18	4	5	0	0	0	4	1	9	3
8	MF	(Brazil) BRA	Giuliano	22	5	5	2	0	0	8	0	8+1	3
10	MF	(Brazil) BRA	Douglas	24	3	3+1	0	0	0	8	1	12	2
12	MF	(Brazil) BRA	Edinho	20	1	0+2	0	0	0	5	0	9+4	1
17	MF	(Brazil) BRA	Ramiro	11	1	1	0	0	0	4	1	6	0
19	MF	(Brazil) BRA	Maicon	25	1	5	0	0	0	7	1	13	0
21	MF	(Brazil) BRA	Felipe Tontini	2	0	0	0	0	0	0	0	0+2	0
27	MF	(Brazil) BRA	Lincoln	21	4	0+2	0	0	0	0+5	1	8+6	3
28	MF	(Brazil) BRA	Kaio Mendes	7	0	0	0	0	0	0	0	4+3	0
37	MF	(Brazil) BRA	Moisés Wolschick	4	0	0	0	0	0	0	0	2+2	0
Forwards
7	FW	(Brazil) BRA	Luan	26	8	5	3	0	0	8	0	12+1	5
9	FW	(Uruguay) URU	Braian Rodríguez	0	0	0	0	0	0	0	0	0	0
11	FW	(Brazil) BRA	Everton	21	4	2+3	1	0	0	3+2	1	9+2	2
13	FW	(Brazil) BRA	Bobô	26	7	2+1	0	0	0	2+4	1	10+7	6
23	FW	(Ecuador) ECU	Miller Bolaños	9	2	2	0	0	0	3	1	2+2	1
24	FW	(Brazil) BRA	Matheus Batista	2	1	0	0	0	0	0	0	0+2	1
32	FW	(Brazil) BRA	Pedro Rocha	16	6	0+2	0	0	0	0+3	0	9+2	6
91	FW	(Brazil) BRA	Henrique Almeida	17	2	1+1	0	0	0	0+4	1	2+9	1
Players who currently don't integrate the squad
29	FW	(Brazil) BRA	Léo Tilica	1	0	0	0	0	0	0	0	0+1	0
32	MF	(Brazil) BRA	Jailson Siqueira	2	0	0	0	0	0	0	0	1+1	0
34	DF	(Brazil) BRA	Iago Silva	4	0	0	0	0	0	0	0	0+4	0
77	FW	(Brazil) BRA	Fernandinho	10	1	0	0	0	0	0+2	0	3+5	1
—	DF	(Brazil) BRA	Kadu	4	0	0	0	0	0	0	0	4	0

Last updated: 5 June 2016.
Source: Match reports in Competitions.

=== Goalscorers ===
The list include all goals in competitive matches.

No.	Pos	Nat	Player	Campeonato Brasileiro	Copa do Brasil	Copa Libertadores de América	Primeira Liga	Campeonato Gaúcho	Total
1	FW	(Brazil)	Luan	3	0	0	0	5	8
2	FW	(Brazil)	Bobô	0	0	1	0	6	7
3	FW	(Brazil)	Pedro Rocha	0	0	0	0	6	6
4	MF	(Brazil)	Giuliano	2	0	0	0	3	5
5	FW	(Brazil)	Everton	1	0	1	0	2	4
5	MF	(Brazil)	Lincoln	0	0	1	0	3	4
5	MF	(Brazil)	Walace	0	0	1	0	3	4
7	DF	(Brazil)	Fred	1	0	1	0	1	3
7	MF	(Brazil)	Douglas	0	0	1	1	1	3
10	FW	(Brazil)	Henrique Almeida	0	0	1	0	1	2
10	FW	(Ecuador)	Miller Bolaños	0	0	1	0	1	2
10	DF	(Brazil)	Pedro Geromel	0	0	0	0	2	2
13	DF	(Brazil)	Edílson	1	0	0	0	0	1
13	DF	(Brazil)	Marcelo Oliveira	1	0	0	0	0	1
13	MF	(Brazil)	Maicon	0	0	1	0	0	1
13	MF	(Brazil)	Ramiro	0	0	1	0	0	1
13	MF	(Brazil)	Edinho	0	0	0	1	0	1
13	DF	(Brazil)	Bressan	0	0	0	1	0	1
13	FW	(Brazil)	Matheus Batista	0	0	0	0	1	1
Players who do not integrate over the First team squad
13	FW	(Brazil)	Fernandinho	0	0	0	0	1	1
Own goals				0	0	0	0	0	0
Total				9	0	10	3	36	58

As of 5 June 2016.
Source: Match reports in Competitions.

=== Clean sheets ===
No.	Pos	Nat	Player	Campeonato Brasileiro	Copa do Brasil	Copa Libertadores de América	Primeira Liga	Campeonato Gaúcho	Total
1	GK	(Brazil)	Marcelo Grohe	4	0	2	2	2	10
2	GK	(Brazil)	Bruno Grassi	0	0	0	0	2	2
Total				4	0	2	2	4	12

As of 5 June 2016.
Source: Match reports in Competitions.

=== Overview ===
Games played	32 (5 Campeonato Brasileiro, 8 Copa Libertadores de América, 3 Primeira Liga, 16 Campeonato Gaúcho)
Games won	18 (3 Campeonato Brasileiro, 3 Copa Libertadores de América, 1 Primeira Liga, 11 Campeonato Gaúcho)
Games drawn	7 (1 Campeonato Brasileiro, 2 Copa Libertadores de América, 2 Primeira Liga, 2 Campeonato Gaúcho)
Games lost	7 (1 Campeonato Brasileiro, 3 Copa Libertadores de América, 3 Campeonato Gaúcho)
Goals scored	58
Goals conceded	34
Goal difference	+24
Clean sheets	12
Best result	5–1 (A) v Passo Fundo – Campeonato Gaúcho – 30 March
Worst result	3–0 (A) v Rosario Central – Copa Libertadores de América – 5 May
Top scorer	Luan (8)

Updated to match played 5 June 2015.
Source: Competitions
