= 2016 Copa do Brasil knockout stage =

The knockout stages of the 2016 Copa do Brasil was played from August 24 to November 26, 2014. A total of 16 teams competed in the knockout stages.

A draw by CBF was held on August 2 to set the matches for this round. The 16 qualified teams were divided in two pots. Teams from pot 1 are the ones who competed at the 2016 Copa Libertadores and the best placed team in the 2015 Brazilian Série A not taking part in the 2016 Copa Libertadores plus the two highest CBF ranked teams qualified via the Third Round. Pot 2 is composed of the other teams that qualified through the Third Round. Each pot was divided into 4 pairs according to the CBF ranking. That division makes sure that each team within a pair will not face each other before the finals as they will be placed in opposite sides of the bracket. There was a draw to decide the home team of the round of 16. The following stages will have other draws to determine the order of the matches as the tournament advances.

== Seeding ==
- 2016 CBF ranking shown in brackets.

Pot 1	Pot 2
(São Paulo (state)) Corinthians (1); (Rio Grande do Sul) Grêmio (2); (Minas Gerais) Cruzeiro (3); (São Paulo (state)) Santos (4); (São Paulo (state)) São Paulo (5); (Minas Gerais) Atlético Mineiro (7); (São Paulo (state)) Palmeiras (8); (Rio Grande do Sul) Internacional (9)	(Rio de Janeiro (state)) Fluminense (10); (Rio de Janeiro (state)) Vasco da Gama (11); (Paraná (state)) Atlético Paranaense (12); (Rio de Janeiro (state)) Botafogo (13); (São Paulo (state)) Ponte Preta (17); (Ceará) Fortaleza (42); (Paraíba) Botafogo (56); (Rio Grande do Sul) Juventude (59)

=== Bracket ===
Round of 16
(Rio Grande do Sul) Juventude (a)	2	0	2
(São Paulo (state)) São Paulo	1	1	2
(São Paulo (state)) Ponte Preta	1	2	3
(Minas Gerais) Atlético Mineiro (a)	1	2	3
(Ceará) Fortaleza	0	1	1
(Rio Grande do Sul) Internacional	3	0	3
(Rio de Janeiro (state)) Vasco da Gama	1	2	3
(São Paulo (state)) Santos	3	2	5
(Paraíba) Botafogo	0	1	1
(São Paulo (state)) Palmeiras	3	0	3
(Rio Grande do Sul) Grêmio (pen.)	1	0	1 (4)
(Paraná (state)) Atlético Paranaense	0	1	1 (3)
(Minas Gerais) Cruzeiro	5	1	6
(Rio de Janeiro (state)) Botafogo	2	0	2
(São Paulo (state)) Corinthians	1	1	2
(Rio de Janeiro (state)) Fluminense	1	0	1

Quarterfinals
(Rio Grande do Sul) Juventude	0	1	1 (2)
(Minas Gerais) Atlético Mineiro	1	0	1 (4)
(Rio Grande do Sul) Internacional	1	2	3
(São Paulo (state)) Santos	2	0	2
(São Paulo (state)) Palmeiras	1	1	2
(Rio Grande do Sul) Grêmio	2	1	3
(Minas Gerais) Cruzeiro	1	4	5
(São Paulo (state)) Corinthians	2	2	4

Semifinals
(Minas Gerais) Atlético Mineiro	2	2	4
(Rio Grande do Sul) Internacional	1	2	3
(Rio Grande do Sul) Grêmio	2	0	2
(Minas Gerais) Cruzeiro	0	0	0

Finals
(Minas Gerais) Atlético Mineiro	1	1	2
(Rio Grande do Sul) Grêmio	3	1	4

== Round of 16 ==
The first legs was played on August 24 – September 1 and the second legs was played on September 21–22, 2016.

Team 1	Agg.	Team 2	1st leg	2nd leg
Juventude (Rio Grande do Sul)	2–2 (a)	(São Paulo (state)) São Paulo	2–1	0–1
Corinthians (São Paulo (state))	2–1	(Rio de Janeiro (state)) Fluminense	1–1	1–0
Vasco da Gama (Rio de Janeiro (state))	3–5	(São Paulo (state)) Santos	1–3	2–2
Botafogo (Paraíba)	1–3	(São Paulo (state)) Palmeiras	0–3	1–0
Grêmio (Rio Grande do Sul)	1–1 (4–3 p)	(Paraná (state)) Atlético Paranaense	1–0	0–1
Fortaleza (Ceará)	1–3	(Rio Grande do Sul) Internacional	0–3	1–0
Cruzeiro (Minas Gerais)	6–2	(Rio de Janeiro (state)) Botafogo	5–2	1–0
Ponte Preta (São Paulo (state))	3–3 (a)	(Minas Gerais) Atlético Mineiro	1–1	2–2

=== Match 71 ===
August 24, 2016
21:45 UTC−3

São Paulo (São Paulo (state))	1–2	(Rio Grande do Sul) Juventude
Chávez 40'	Report	Roberson 9', 74' (pen.)

Estádio do Morumbi, São Paulo
Attendance: 6,643
Referee: Wilton Pereira Sampaio (Goiás)

September 22, 2016
21:30 UTC−3

Juventude (Rio Grande do Sul)	0–1	(São Paulo (state)) São Paulo
	Report	Rodrigo Caio 69'

Estádio Alfredo Jaconi, Caxias do Sul
Attendance: 10,095
Referee: Ricardo Marques (Minas Gerais)

Tied 2–2 on aggregate, Juventude won on away goals.

=== Match 72 ===
August 31, 2016
21:45 UTC−3

Fluminense (Rio de Janeiro (state))	1–1	(São Paulo (state)) Corinthians
Marquinho 36'	Report	Rodriguinho 62'

Estádio Giulite Coutinho, Mesquita
Attendance: 7,027
Referee: Elmo Alves Resende Cunha (Goiás)

September 21, 2016
21:45 UTC−3

Corinthians (São Paulo (state))	1–0	(Rio de Janeiro (state)) Fluminense
Rodriguinho 68'	Report

Arena Corinthians, São Paulo
Attendance: 20,614
Referee: Rodolpho Tolski Marques (Paraná)

Corinthians won 2–1 on aggregate.

=== Match 73 ===
August 24, 2016
19:30 UTC−3

Santos (São Paulo (state))	3–1	(Rio de Janeiro (state)) Vasco da Gama
Renato 30'; Ricardo Oliveira 37'; Lucas Lima 65'	Report	Éder Luís 90+6'

Estádio Urbano Caldeira, Santos
Attendance: 6,130
Referee: Héber Roberto Lopes (Santa Catarina)

September 21, 2016
21:45 UTC−3

Vasco da Gama (Rio de Janeiro (state))	2–2	(São Paulo (state)) Santos
Nenê 25'; Éderson 70'	Report	Copete 11'; Rodrigo 83' (o.g.)

Estádio São Januário, Rio de Janeiro
Attendance: 18,265
Referee: Jean Pierre Gonçalves Lima (Rio Grande do Sul)

Santos won 5–3 on aggregate.

=== Match 74 ===
August 31, 2016
19:30 UTC−3

Palmeiras (São Paulo (state))	3–0	(Paraíba) Botafogo
Jean 57' (pen.); Rafael Marques 62'; Tchê Tchê 80'	Report

Allianz Parque, São Paulo
Attendance: 24,512
Referee: Dewson Freitas da Silva (Pará)

September 21, 2016
21:30 UTC−3

Botafogo (Paraíba)	1–0	(São Paulo (state)) Palmeiras
Carlinhos 76'	Report

Almeidão, João Pessoa
Attendance: 11,298
Referee: Jailson Macedo Freitas (Bahia)

Palmeiras won 3–1 on aggregate.

=== Match 75 ===
August 24, 2016
19:30 UTC−3

Atlético Paranaense (Paraná (state))	0–1	(Rio Grande do Sul) Grêmio
	Report	Bolaños 7'

Arena da Baixada, Curitiba
Attendance: 14,300
Referee: Ricardo Marques (Minas Gerais)

September 21, 2016
19:30 UTC−3

Grêmio (Rio Grande do Sul)	0–1	(Paraná (state)) Atlético Paranaense
	Report	André Lima 30'
Penalties
Maicon (penalty scored); Edílson (penalty scored); Walace (penalty missed); Douglas (penalty missed); Luan (penalty missed); Marcelo Oliveira (penalty scored); Kannemann (penalty missed); Guilherme (penalty scored)	4–3	(penalty scored) Thiago Heleno; (penalty missed) João Pedro; (penalty missed) Otávio; (penalty missed) Zé Ivaldo; (penalty scored) Hernani; (penalty scored) Marcos Guilherme; (penalty missed) Weverton; (penalty missed) Paulo André

Arena do Grêmio, Porto Alegre
Attendance: 12,321
Referee: Vinícius Furlan (São Paulo)

Tied 1–1 on aggregate, Grêmio won on penalties.

=== Match 76 ===
August 31, 2016
21:45 UTC−3

Internacional (Rio Grande do Sul)	3–0	(Ceará) Fortaleza
Aylon 10', 51'; López 44'	Report

Estádio Beira-Rio, Porto Alegre
Attendance: 11,746
Referee: Ricardo Marques (Minas Gerais)

September 22, 2016
19:15 UTC−3

Fortaleza (Ceará)	1–0	(Rio Grande do Sul) Internacional
Daniel Sobralense 14'	Report

Castelão, Fortaleza
Attendance: 17,375
Referee: Thiago Duarte Peixoto (São Paulo)

Internacional won 3–1 on aggregate.

=== Match 77 ===
September 1, 2016
20:00 UTC−3

Botafogo (Rio de Janeiro (state))	2–5	(Minas Gerais) Cruzeiro
Sassá 37'; Neílton 59'	Report	Ábila 45' (pen.), 63'; Robinho 59', 67'; Henrique 92'

Estádio Luso-Brasileiro, Rio de Janeiro
Attendance: 4,491
Referee: Flavio Rodrigues de Souza (São Paulo)

September 21, 2016
21:45 UTC−3

Cruzeiro (Minas Gerais)	1–0	(Rio de Janeiro (state)) Botafogo
Bruno Rodrigo 37'	Report

Mineirão, Belo Horizonte
Attendance: 10,604
Referee: Marcelo Aparecido de Souza (São Paulo)

Cruzeiro won 6–2 on aggregate.

=== Match 78 ===
August 24, 2016
21:45 UTC−3

Atlético Mineiro (Minas Gerais)	1–1	(São Paulo (state)) Ponte Preta
Robinho 65'	Report	Roger 38'

Mineirão, Belo Horizonte
Attendance: 15,493
Referee: Anderson Daronco (Rio Grande do Sul)

September 21, 2016
19:30 UTC−3

Ponte Preta (São Paulo (state))	2–2	(Minas Gerais) Atlético Mineiro
Roger 14'; Felipe Azevedo 48'	Report	Pratto 75'; Robinho 85'

Estádio Moisés Lucarelli, Campinas
Attendance: 8,588
Referee: Heber Roberto Lopes (Santa Catarina)

Tied 3–3 on aggregate, Atlético Mineiro won on away goals.

== Quarterfinals ==
The first leg was played on September 28 and the second leg was played on October 19, 2016.

Team 1	Agg.	Team 2	1st leg	2nd leg
Juventude (Rio Grande do Sul)	1–1 (2–4 p)	(Minas Gerais) Atletico Mineiro	0–1	1–0
Internacional (Rio Grande do Sul)	3–2	(São Paulo (state)) Santos	1–2	2–0
Palmeiras (São Paulo (state))	2–3	(Rio Grande do Sul) Grêmio	1–2	1–1
Cruzeiro (Minas Gerais)	5–4	(São Paulo (state)) Corinhians	1–2	4–2

=== Match 79 ===
September 28, 2016
19:30 UTC−3

Atlético Mineiro (Minas Gerais)	1–0	(Rio Grande do Sul) Juventude
Pratto 17'	Report

Mineirão, Belo Horizonte
Attendance: 34,705
Referee: Vinícius Furlan (São Paulo)

October 19, 2016
19:30 UTC−2

Juventude (Rio Grande do Sul)	1–0	(Minas Gerais) Atlético Mineiro
Hugo 1'	Report
Penalties
Hugo (penalty scored); Sananduva (penalty scored); Wallacer (penalty missed); Roberson (penalty missed)	2–4	(penalty scored) Fábio Santos; (penalty scored) Pratto; (penalty scored) Gabriel; (penalty scored) Cazares

Estádio Alfredo Jaconi, Caxias do Sul
Attendance: 4,457
Referee: Jailson Macedo Freitas (Bahia)

Tied 1–1 on aggregate, Atlético Mineiro won on penalties.

=== Match 80 ===
September 28, 2016
19:30 UTC−3

Santos (São Paulo (state))	2–1	(Rio Grande do Sul) Internacional
Copete 49'; Rodrigão 56'	Report	Seijas 72'

Estádio Urbano Caldeira, Santos
Attendance: 6,592
Referee: Gilberto Rodrigues Castro Júnior (Pernambuco)

October 19, 2016
19:30 UTC−2

Internacional (Rio Grande do Sul)	2–0	(São Paulo (state)) Santos
Aylon 10'; Eduardo Sasha 88'	Report

Estádio Beira-Rio, Porto Alegre
Attendance: 15,065
Referee: Wagner do Nascimento Magalhães (Rio de Janeiro)

Internacional won 3–2 on aggregate.

=== Match 81 ===
September 28, 2016
21:45 UTC−3

Grêmio (Rio Grande do Sul)	2–1	(São Paulo (state)) Palmeiras
Ramiro 33'; Pedro Rocha 45'	Report	Zé Roberto 51' (pen.)

Arena do Grêmio, Porto Alegre
Attendance: 24,471
Referee: Cláudio Francisco Lima e Silva (Sergipe)

October 19, 2016
21:45 UTC−2

Palmeiras (São Paulo (state))	1–1	(Rio Grande do Sul) Grêmio
Thiago Martins 51'	Report	Everton 76'

Allianz Parque, São Paulo
Attendance: 29,991
Referee: Elmo Resende Alves Cunha (Goiás)

Grêmio won 3–2 on aggregate.

=== Match 82 ===
September 28, 2016
21:45 UTC−3

Corinthians (São Paulo (state))	2–1	(Minas Gerais) Cruzeiro
Léo 47' (o.g.); Romero 54'	Report	Robinho 78'

Arena Corinthians, São Paulo
Attendance: 18,796
Referee: Eduardo Tomaz de Aquino Valadão (Goiás)

October 19, 2016
21:45 UTC−2

Cruzeiro (Minas Gerais)	4–2	(São Paulo (state)) Corinthians
Ábila 14', 59' (pen.); Bruno Rodrigo 62'; Arrascaeta 83'	Report	Rodriguinho 35'; Rildo 86'

Mineirão, Belo Horizonte
Attendance: 32,738
Referee: Wilton Pereira Sampaio (Goiás)

Cruzeiro won 5–4 on aggregate.

== Semifinals ==
The first leg was played on October 26 and the second leg was played on November 2, 2016.

Team 1	Agg.	Team 2	1st leg	2nd leg
Atletico Mineiro (Minas Gerais)	4–3	(Rio Grande do Sul) Internacional	2–1	2–2
Grêmio (Rio Grande do Sul)	2–0	(Minas Gerais) Cruzeiro	2–0	0–0

=== Match 83 ===
October 26, 2016
21:45 UTC−2

Internacional (Rio Grande do Sul)	1–2	(Minas Gerais) Atlético Mineiro
William 70' (pen.)	Report	Otero 4'; Pratto 89'

Beira-Rio, Porto Alegre
Attendance: 27,233
Referee: Marcelo de Lima Henrique (Pernambuco)

November 2, 2016
21:45 UTC−2

Atlético Mineiro (Minas Gerais)	2–2	(Rio Grande do Sul) Internacional
Robinho 45+1'; Pratto 61'	Report	Aylon 27'; Anderson 45+3'

Estádio Raimundo Sampaio, Belo Horizonte
Attendance: 20,447
Referee: Jailson Macedo Freitas (Bahia)

Atlético Mineiro won 4–3 on aggregate.

=== Match 84 ===
October 26, 2016
21:45 UTC−2

Cruzeiro (Minas Gerais)	0–2	(Rio Grande do Sul) Grêmio
	Report	Luan 20'; Douglas 62'

Mineirão, Belo Horizonte
Attendance: 50,715
Referee: Pericles Bassols Pegado Cortez (Pernambuco)

November 2, 2016
21:45 UTC−2

Grêmio (Rio Grande do Sul)	0–0	(Minas Gerais) Cruzeiro
	Report

Arena do Grêmio, Porto Alegre
Attendance: 47,687
Referee: Thiago Duarte Peixoto (São Paulo)

Grêmio won 2–0 on aggregate.

== Finals ==
The first leg will be played on November 23 and the second leg will be played on November 30, 2016.

Team 1	Agg.	Team 2	1st leg	2nd leg
Grêmio (Rio Grande do Sul)	4–2	(Minas Gerais) Atletico Mineiro	3–1	1–1

=== Match 85 ===
November 23, 2016
21:45 UTC−2

Atletico Mineiro (Minas Gerais)	1–3	(Rio Grande do Sul) Grêmio
Gabriel 82'	Report	Pedro Rocha 30', 55'; Everton 90+1'

Mineirão, Belo Horizonte
Attendance: 47,944
Referee: Pericles Bassols Pegado Cortez (Pernambuco)

=== Match 86 ===
December 7, 2016 (Note: The match was originally scheduled to be played on 30 November 2016, but was postponed in a week due to Chapecoense air disaster.)
21:45 UTC−2

Grêmio (Rio Grande do Sul)	1–1	(Minas Gerais) Atletico Mineiro
Bolaños 89'	Report	Cazares 90+2'

Arena do Grêmio, Porto Alegre
Attendance: 55,337
Referee: Luiz Flávio de Oliveira (São Paulo)

Grêmio won 4–2 on aggregate.
