= Gabriel Costa =

Gabriel Costa may refer to:

- Gabriel Costa (politician) (born 1954), former Prime Minister of São Tomé and Príncipe
- Gabriel Costa (footballer) (born 1990), Peruvian football midfielder
- Gabriel Costa França (born 1995), Brazilian football defender
