= 2016 Copa do Brasil finals =

2016 Copa do Brasil Finals
- Event: 2016 Copa do Brasil
Atlético Mineiro	Grêmio
(Minas Gerais)	(Rio Grande do Sul)
2	4

First leg
Atlético Mineiro	Grêmio
1	3
- Date: 23 November 2016
- Venue: Mineirão, Belo Horizonte
- Referee: Péricles Bassols Pegado Cortez (Pernambuco)

Second leg
Grêmio	Atlético Mineiro
1	1
- Date: 7 December 2016
- Venue: Arena do Grêmio, Porto Alegre
- Referee: Luiz Flávio de Oliveira (São Paulo)

The 2016 Copa do Brasil Finals were the final two-legged tie that decided the 2016 Copa do Brasil, the 28th season of the Copa do Brasil, Brazil's national cup football tournament organised by the Brazilian Football Confederation. The finals were contested in a two-legged home-and-away format between Atlético Mineiro, from Minas Gerais, and Grêmio, from Rio Grande do Sul. The latter were crowned champions by an aggregate score of 4–2.

The first leg was played at the Mineirão stadium in Belo Horizonte, on 23 November 2016. The second leg was scheduled to be played in the Arena do Grêmio, in Porto Alegre, on 30 November 2016, but was postponed to 7 December, following the crash of an aeroplane carrying the squad of Brazilian team Chapecoense on their way to the first leg of the Copa Sudamericana final.

It was Atlético Mineiro's second and Grêmio's eighth appearance in the finals of the competition, and the first time the teams faced each other in this stage. Grêmio earned the right to play in the 2017 Copa Libertadores through their victory.

== Qualified teams ==
Team	Previous finals appearances (bold indicates winners)
(Minas Gerais) Atlético Mineiro	1 (**2014**)
(Rio Grande do Sul) Grêmio	7 (**1989**, 1991, 1993, **1994**, 1995, **1997**, **2001**)

== Road to the final ==
Note: In all results below, the score of the finalist is given first (H: home; A: away).

(Minas Gerais) Atlético Mineiro				Round	(Rio Grande do Sul) Grêmio			
Opponent	Agg.	1st leg	2nd leg		Opponent	Agg.	1st leg	2nd leg
(São Paulo (state)) Ponte Preta	3–3 (a)	1–1 (H)	2–2 (A)	Round of 16	(Paraná (state)) Atlético Paranaense	1–1 (4–3 p)	1–0 (A)	0–1 (H)
(Rio Grande do Sul) Juventude	1–1 (4–2 p)	1–0 (H)	0–1 (A)	Quarter-finals	(São Paulo (state)) Palmeiras	3–2	2–1 (H)	1–1 (A)
(Rio Grande do Sul) Internacional	4–3	2–1 (A)	2–2 (H)	Semi-finals	(Minas Gerais) Cruzeiro	2–0	2–0 (A)	0–0 (H)

== Match ==
The home-and-away teams for both legs were determined by a draw held on 4 November 2016 at the Brazilian Football Confederation headquarters in Rio de Janeiro, Brazil.

23 November 2016
21:45 (UTC−02:00)

Atlético Mineiro	1–3	Grêmio
Gabriel 82'	Report	Pedro Rocha 30', 55'; Everton 90+1'

Mineirão, Belo Horizonte
Attendance: 47,944
Referee: Péricles Bassols Pegado Cortez (Pernambuco)
7 December 2016
21:45 (UTC−02:00)

Grêmio	1–1	Atlético Mineiro
Bolaños 89'	Report	Cazares 90+2'

Arena do Grêmio, Porto Alegre
Attendance: 55,337
Referee: Luiz Flávio de Oliveira (São Paulo)

**Match rules**

- 90 minutes.
- Penalty shoot-out if scores level after both legs.
- Seven named substitutes, of which up to three may be used.

== See also ==
- 2016 Campeonato Brasileiro Série A
