= Leonardo Gomes =

Leonardo Gomes may refer to:

- Leonardo Gomes (footballer, born 1996), Brazilian football right-back
- Léo Gomes (footballer, born 1997), Brazilian football midfielder
