= Michel (footballer, born 1990) =

Brazilian footballer

Personal information
- Full name: Michel Ferreira dos Santos
- Date of birth: 22 March 1990 (age 36)
- Place of birth: Rio de Janeiro, Brazil
- Height: 1.83 m (6 ft 0 in)
- Position: Defensive midfielder

Youth career
- 2005–2008: São Cristóvão

Senior career*
Years	Team	Apps	(Gls)
2008–2010	São Cristóvão	12	(0)
2011	Porto Alegre	9	(0)
2011–2012	Madureira	21	(0)
2013–2015	Guarani de Palhoça	61	(11)
2013	→ Imbituba (loan)	16	(3)
2014	→ Novorizontino (loan)	17	(4)
2015	→ Camboriú (loan)	10	(5)
2016–2017	Novorizontino	8	(4)
2016	→ Atlético Goianiense (loan)	35	(4)
2017	→ Grêmio (loan)	32	(6)
2018–2022	Grêmio	49	(2)
2020	→ Fortaleza (loan)	2	(0)
2021	→ Vasco da Gama (loan)	6	(0)
2022	Operário Ferroviário	1	(0)
- * Club domestic league appearances and goals as of 9 August 2022

Michel Ferreira dos Santos (born 22 March 1990), simply known as Michel, is a Brazilian footballer who plays as a defensive midfielder.

== Club career ==
=== Early career ===
Born in Rio de Janeiro, Michel started his career with São Cristóvão, being promoted to the first team at the age of just 16. He subsequently represented Porto Alegre, Madureira, Guarani de Palhoça, Imbituba, Novorizontino and Camboriú before returning to Novorizontino in 2016.

=== Atlético Goianiense ===
After impressing with Tigre, Michel signed a loan contract with Série B side Atlético Goianiense on 26 April 2016. He immediately became an undisputed starter for the side, contributing with four goals in 35 appearances and achieving top level promotion as champions.

=== Grêmio ===
On 27 December 2016, Michel was loaned to Série A club Grêmio, for one year. He made his debut in the category on 14 May, starting in a 2–0 home win against Botafogo.

Michel scored his first goals in the top tier on 8 June 2017, netting a brace in a 6–3 away defeat of Chapecoense. He ended the campaign with five goals, being crowned the year's Bola de Prata. In December, Grêmio exercised the buyout clause on his contract, and he signed a permanent two-year contract.

Michel subsequently struggled with injuries in the following years, but still renewed his contract until 2022 on 30 April 2019.

== Career statistics ==
As of 25 November 2021

Club	Season	League			State League		Cup		Continental		Other		Total	
Club	Season	Division	Apps	Goals	Apps	Goals	Apps	Goals	Apps	Goals	Apps	Goals	Apps	Goals
São Cristóvão	2008	Carioca Série B	—		0	0	—		—		—		0	0
São Cristóvão	2009	Carioca Série B	—		2	0	—		—		—		2	0
São Cristóvão	2010	Carioca Série B	—		10	0	—		—		—		10	0
São Cristóvão	Subtotal		—		12	0	—		—		—		12	0
Porto Alegre	2011	Gaúcho	—		9	0	—		—		—		9	0
Madureira	2011	Série C	2	0	—		—		—		15 (Note: Appearance(s) in Copa Rio)	0	17	0
Madureira	2012	Série C	13	0	6	0	1	0	—		12	0	32	0
Madureira	Subtotal		15	0	6	0	1	0	—		27	0	49	0
Guarani de Palhoça	2013	Catarinense	—		17	1	—		—		—		17	1
Guarani de Palhoça	2014	Série D	7	2	23	6	—		—		—		30	8
Guarani de Palhoça	2015	Catarinense	—		14	2	—		—		—		14	2
Guarani de Palhoça	Subtotal		7	2	54	9	—		—		—		61	11
Imbituba (loan)	2013	Catarinense Divisão Especial	—		16	3	—		—		—		16	3
Novorizontino (loan)	2014	Paulista A3	—		17	4	—		—		—		17	4
Camboriú (loan)	2015	Catarinense Divisão Especial	—		10	5	—		—		—		10	5
Novorizontino	2016	Paulista	—		8	4	—		—		—		8	4
Atlético Goianiense (loan)	2016	Série B	35	4	—		—		—		—		35	4
Grêmio	2017	Série A	23	5	9	1	6	0	11 (Note: Appearance(s) in Copa Libertadores)	0	3 (Note: One appearance in Primeira Liga, two appearances in FIFA Club World Cup)	0	52	6
Grêmio	2018	Série A	10	1	7	1	1	0	4	1	—		22	3
Grêmio	2019	Série A	22	0	10	0	2	0	6	0	—		40	0
Grêmio	Subtotal		55	6	26	2	9	0	21	1	3	0	114	9
Fortaleza (loan)	2020	Série A	0	0	2	0	—		1 (Note: Appearance(s) in Copa Sudamericana)	0	3 (Note: Appearance(s) in Copa do Nordeste)	0	6	0
Vasco da Gama (loan)	2021	Série B	6	0	—		1	0	—		—		7	0
Career total			118	12	160	27	11	0	22	1	33	0	344	40

== Honours ==
=== Club ===
Madureira

- Copa Rio: 2012

Novorizontino

- Campeonato Paulista Série A3: 2014

Atlético Goianiense

- Campeonato Brasileiro Série B: 2016

Grêmio

- Copa Libertadores: 2017
- Recopa Sudamericana: 2018
- Campeonato Gaúcho: 2018, 2019
- Recopa Gaúcha: 2019, 2022

=== Individual ===
- Bola de Prata: 2017
