= Kaio (footballer, born 1995) =

Brazilian footballer

Personal information
- Full name: Kaio Silva Mendes
- Date of birth: 18 March 1995 (age 31)
- Place of birth: Várzea Grande, Brazil
- Height: 1.73 m (5 ft 8 in)
- Position: Midfielder

Team information
- Current team: Chapecoense
- Number: 8

Youth career
- 2008–2009: Brasil Central
- 2010–2012: Juventude
- 2013–2015: Grêmio

Senior career*
Years	Team	Apps	(Gls)
2015–2020	Grêmio	40	(1)
2019	→ Sport Recife (loan)	4	(0)
2020	→ Paraná (loan)	28	(0)
2021	Paraná	3	(0)
2021–2022	Ituano	61	(5)
2023–	Chapecoense	17	(1)
- * Club domestic league appearances and goals as of 2 June 2023

Kaio Silva Mendes (born 18 March 1995), simply known as Kaio, is a Brazilian footballer who plays as a midfielder for Chapecoense.

== Career ==
Born in Várzea Grande, Kaio began his career with Grêmio Foot-Ball Porto Alegrense. He made two appearances as an unused substitute in the 2015 Campeonato Brasileiro Série A season, the first being a 2–0 win at Figueirense FC on 4 September.

The following 10 February, he made his professional debut in a 1–0 win at Veranópolis Esporte Clube Recreativo e Cultural in the 2016 Campeonato Gaúcho, as a half-time replacement for Moisés.

On 31 January 2019, Kaio was loaned out to Sport Club do Recife until the end of the year.

== Honours ==
Grêmio

- Copa do Brasil: 2016
- Copa Libertadores: 2017
- Recopa Sudamericana: 2018
- Campeonato Gaúcho 2018
