= Pedro Rocha (footballer, born 1994) =

Brazilian footballer

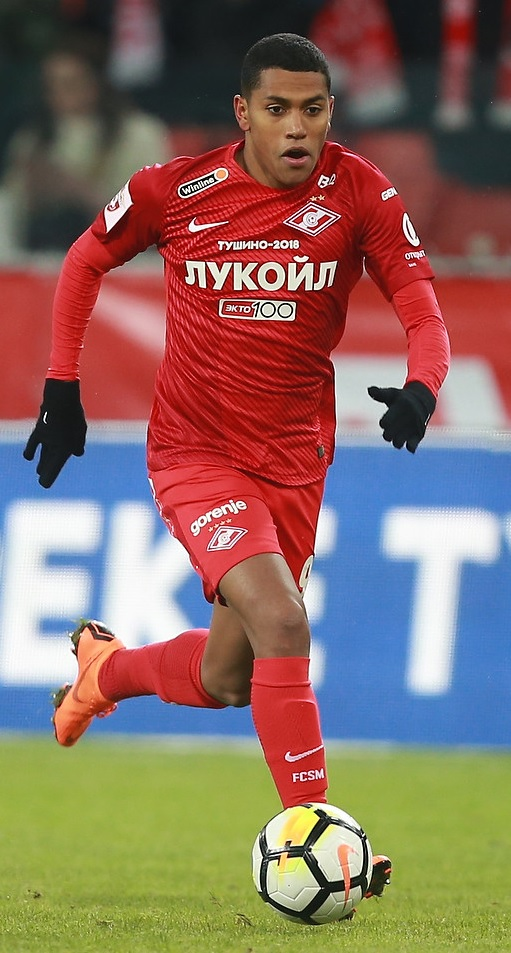
- Rocha with Spartak in 2018

Personal information
- Full name: Pedro Rocha Neves
- Date of birth: 1 October 1994 (age 32)
- Place of birth: Vila Velha, Brazil
- Height: 1.78 m (5 ft 10 in)
- Position: Forward

Team information
- Current team: Coritiba
- Number: 32

Youth career
- 1998–2008: Atlético Mineiro
- 2008: São Paulo
- 2008–2011: José Bonifácio
- 2011–2014: Diadema
- 2011–2013: → Juventus-SP (loan)
- 2014: → Grêmio (loan)

Senior career*
Years	Team	Apps	(Gls)
2013–2014	Diadema	0	(0)
2013	→ Juventus-SP (loan)	3	(2)
2015–2017	Grêmio	96	(19)
2017–2022	Spartak Moscow	12	(1)
2019	→ Cruzeiro (loan)	25	(2)
2020	→ Flamengo (loan)	9	(1)
2021	→ Spartak-2 Moscow	15	(4)
2021–2022	→ Athletico Paranaense (loan)	26	(4)
2022–2024	Fortaleza	45	(4)
2024	Criciúma	7	(0)
2025	Remo	38	(18)
2026–	Coritiba	15	(5)
- * Club domestic league appearances and goals as of 7 April 2026

Pedro Rocha Neves (born 1 October 1994), known as Pedro Rocha, is a Brazilian footballer who plays as a forward for Coritiba.

== Club career ==
=== Early career ===
Born in Vila Velha, Espírito Santo, Pedro Rocha started his career in an Atlético Mineiro academy in his hometown, before attracting the interest of São Paulo. In 2008, aged 13, he joined the latter, but was released just months later.

In 2011 Pedro Rocha joined Juventus-SP, after a partnership with Diadema. With the club he made his senior debut on 20 March 2013, starting in a 3–2 Campeonato Paulista Série A2 away win against Santo André, and scoring a brace through two penalties.

=== Grêmio ===
On 12 March 2014 Pedro Rocha moved to Grêmio on loan until the end of the year, being initially assigned to the under-20s. On 7 January 2015 he was bought outright, and was subsequently promoted to the main squad by manager Luiz Felipe Scolari.

Pedro Rocha made his Série A debut on 16 May 2015, starting in a 0–2 away loss against Coritiba. He scored his first goal in the category on 27 June, netting the first in a 2–1 win at Avaí; it was also the fastest of the tournament, with only 37 seconds.

Pedro Rocha scored a brace in the first leg of the 2016 Copa do Brasil Finals against Atlético Mineiro, but was subsequently sent off.

=== Spartak Moscow ===
On 31 August 2017, he signed with the Russian Premier League champions FC Spartak Moscow.

==== Loan to Cruzeiro ====
On 2 April 2019, Cruzeiro announced the signing of the player on loan until the end of the year.

==== Loan to Flamengo ====
On 24 December 2019, Spartak announced that Rocha will join Flamengo on loan until the end of 2020 with a purchase option.

==== Return to Spartak ====
On 13 January 2021, Spartak confirmed that Rocha returned to the club as his loan ended. On 24 February 2021, following the return of Quincy Promes to Spartak, Rocha was removed from Spartak's RPL squad as he was deemed the surplus foreign player by the club (Russian clubs were only allowed to register 8 foreign players at the same time). The club was hoping to sell his rights permanently. He was added to the second-tier FNL squad Spartak-2 Moscow on the same day. He was not registered for Spartak's league roster for the 2021–22 season either.

==== Loan to Athletico Paranaense ====
On 13 August 2021, Spartak announced a new loan to Athletico Paranaense for a one-year term. If he played in predetermined number of games during the loan, Athletico Paranaense would hold an obligation to purchase his rights.

=== Fortaleza ===
On 11 August 2022, Rocha joined Fortaleza until the end of 2023.

== Career statistics ==
As of 13 October 2021.

Club	Season	League			State League		Cup		Continental		Other		Total	
Club	Season	Division	Apps	Goals	Apps	Goals	Apps	Goals	Apps	Goals	Apps	Goals	Apps	Goals
Juventus-SP	2013	Paulista A2	—		3	2	—		—		18 (Note: Appearance(s) in Copa Paulista)	5	21	7
Grêmio	2015	Série A	34	5	4	1	6	3	—		—		44	9
Grêmio	2016	Série A	23	3	9	6	6	3	3 (Note: Appearance(s) in Copa Libertadores)	0	2 (Note: Appearance(s) in Primeira Liga)	0	43	12
Grêmio	2017	Série A	15	3	11	1	6	3	8	4	—		40	11
Grêmio	Total		72	11	24	8	18	9	11	4	2	0	127	32
Spartak Moscow	2017–18	Russian Premier League	11	1	—		2	0	1 (Note: Appearance(s) in UEFA Champions League)	0	—		14	1
Spartak Moscow	2018–19	Russian Premier League	1	0	—		1	0	2 (Note: Appearance(s) in UEFA Europa League)	0	—		4	0
Spartak Moscow	Total		12	1	—		3	0	3	0	—		18	1
Cruzeiro (loan)	2019	Série A	23	2	2	0	6	2	2	0	—		33	4
Flamengo (loan)	2020	Série A	5	0	4	1	2	0	0	0	0	0	11	1
Spartak-2 Moscow	2020–21	Russian Football National League	15	4	—		—		—		—		15	4
Athletico Paranaense (loan)	2021	Série A	8	2	—		2	0	2 (Note: Appearance(s) in Copa Sudamericana)	2	—		12	4
Career total			135	20	33	11	31	11	18	6	20	5	237	53

== Honours ==
Grêmio

- Copa do Brasil: 2016

Cruzeiro

- Campeonato Mineiro: 2019

Flamengo

- Recopa Sudamericana: 2020
- Supercopa do Brasil: 2020
- Campeonato Carioca: 2020

Athletico Paranaense

- Copa Sudamericana: 2021

Fortaleza

- Campeonato Cearense: 2023
- Copa do Nordeste: 2024

Remo

- Campeonato Paraense: 2025

Individual

- 2025 Campeonato Brasileiro Série B top scorer: 15 goals
