= Guilherme Truyts =

Brazilian footballer

Personal information
- Full name: Guilherme Truyts Pereira de Faria
- Date of birth: 4 June 1997 (age 29)
- Place of birth: Jacareí, Brazil
- Height: 1.89 m (6 ft 2 in)
- Position: Centre-back

Team information
- Current team: Foz do Iguaçu

Youth career
- 2011–2016: São Paulo
- 2016–2017: Grêmio

Senior career*
| Years | Team | Apps | (Gls) |
| 2017–2020 | Grêmio | 0 | (0) |
| 2017–2018 | → Atlético Tubarão (loan) | 3 | (0) |
| 2019 | → Ipatinga (loan) | 3 | (0) |
| 2019 | → Caxias (loan) | 5 | (1) |
| 2020 | Tupã | 8 | (1) |
| 2021 | Ipatinga | 10 | (0) |
| 2021 | Rio Claro | 2 | (0) |
| 2022 | Barretos | 12 | (0) |
| 2022 | XV de Piracicaba | 6 | (0) |
| 2023 | Bandeirante | 3 | (0) |
| 2023 | Aymorés | 20 | (2) |
| 2023 | Volta Redonda | 2 | (0) |
| 2024 | Maguary-PE | 1 | (0) |
| 2024 | North | 3 | (0) |
| 2024 | América-PE | 3 | (0) |
| 2025 | Aymorés | 3 | (0) |
| 2025– | Foz do Iguaçu | 12 | (0) |
- * Club domestic league appearances and goals as of 14 October 2025

Guilherme Truyts Pereira de Faria (born 4 June 1997), simply known as Guilherme Truyts, is a Brazilian professional footballer who plays as a centre-back.

== Career ==
Revealed in the youth sectors of São Paulo, he also played for the B and U23 teams of Grêmio, as well as Caxias, Ipatinga, XV de Piracicaba among other clubs. In August 2023, Truyts signed with Volta Redonda. In 2025 season, Trutys played once more for Aymorés. In the second half of the year, he signed with Foz do Iguaçu.

== Honours ==
XV de Piracicaba

- Copa Paulista: 2022
