= Gabriel (footballer, born 1995) =

Brazilian footballer (born 1995)

Personal information
- Full name: Gabriel Costa França
- Date of birth: 14 March 1995 (age 31)
- Place of birth: Pedro Leopoldo, Brazil
- Height: 1.81 m (5 ft 11 in)
- Position: Centre-back

Team information
- Current team: RB Omiya Ardija
- Number: 55

Youth career
- 2005–2015: Atlético Mineiro

Senior career*
Years	Team	Apps	(Gls)
2014–2021	Atlético Mineiro	122	(5)
2019	→ Botafogo (loan)	44	(1)
2021–2024	Yokohama FC	67	(8)
2025–	RB Omiya Ardija	28	(1)
- * Club domestic league appearances and goals as of 20:58, 10 June 2026 (UTC)

Gabriel Costa França (born 14 March 1995), simply known as Gabriel, is a Brazilian professional footballer who plays as a central defender for and captains J2 League club RB Omiya Ardija.

== Career ==
Gabriel was born in Pedro Leopoldo, Minas Gerais, and joined Atlético Mineiro's youth setup in 2005. He made his senior debut for the club on 8 February 2014, starting in a 2–0 Campeonato Mineiro away loss against Tupi.

Gabriel subsequently returned to the under-20 squad, and was promoted to the first team ahead of the 2016 season. He made his Série A debut on 14 May of that year by starting in a 1–0 home win against Santos.

Gabriel became a regular starter for the club in September 2016, and scored his first professional goal on 23 November of that year, in a 3–1 home loss against Grêmio in the 2016 Copa do Brasil Finals.

On 3 January 2019, Gabriel was sent on a two-year loan to Botafogo. He, however, rejoined Atlético at the start of 2020.

On 13 July 2021, Gabriel agreed to a permanent deal with Yokohama FC. Gabriel became a captain team on 5 February 2023.

On 27 December 2024, Gabriel was announced to be joining newly promoted J2 club RB Omiya Ardija.

In February 2026, Gabriel was appointed captain of RB Omiya Ardija ahead of the 2026 season.

== Career statistics ==
As of match played 6 June 2026

Appearances and goals by club, season and competition
Club	Season	League			State league (Note: Includes Campeonato Mineiro, Campeonato Carioca)		National cup (Note: Includes Copa do Brasil)		League cup (Note: Includes J.League Cup)		Continental		Other		Total	
Club	Season	Division	Apps	Goals	Apps	Goals	Apps	Goals	Apps	Goals	Apps	Goals	Apps	Goals	Apps	Goals
Atlético Mineiro	2014	Série A	0	0	1	0	0	0	—		—		—		1	0
Atlético Mineiro	2016	Série A	15	0	3	0	6	1	—		0	0	1 (Note: Appearance(s) in Primeira Liga)	0	25	1
Atlético Mineiro	2017	Série A	26	1	14	1	4	0	—		7 (Note: Appearance(s) in Copa Libertadores)	0	5	0	56	2
Atlético Mineiro	2018	Série A	21	0	12	0	7	0	—		1 (Note: Appearance(s) in Copa Sudamericana)	0	—		41	0
Atlético Mineiro	2020	Série A	9	0	9	1	1	1	—		2	0	—		21	2
Atlético Mineiro	2021	Série A	5	1	7	1	1	0	—		1	0	—		14	2
Atlético Mineiro	Total		76	2	46	3	19	2	0	0	11	0	6	0	158	7
Botafogo (loan)	2019	Série A	34	1	10	0	4	0	—		4	0	—		52	1
Yokohama FC	2021	J1 League	11	0	—		0	0	0	0	—		—		11	0
Yokohama FC	2022	J2 League	29	3	—		0	0	—		—		—		29	3
Yokohama FC	2023	J1 League	2	0	—		0	0	0	0	—		0	0	2	0
Yokohama FC	2024	J2 League	25	3	—		0	0	0	0	—		0	0	25	3
Yokohama FC	Total		67	6	0	0	0	0	0	0	0	0	0	0	67	6
RB Omiya Ardija	2025	J2 League	21	0	—		0	0	1	0	—		0	0	22	0
RB Omiya Ardija	2026	J2/J3	7	1	—		—		—		—		—		7	1
RB Omiya Ardija	Total		28	1	—		0	0	1	0	—		0	0	29	1
Career total			205	10	56	3	23	2	1	0	15	0	6	0	306	15

== Honours ==
Atlético Mineiro

- Campeonato Mineiro: 2017, 2020, 2021
