= Leonardo Gomes (footballer, born 1996) =

Brazilian footballer

Personal information
- Full name: Leonardo Gomes da Conceição Silva
- Date of birth: 30 March 1996 (age 30)
- Place of birth: Araguaína, Brazil
- Height: 1.83 m (6 ft 0 in)
- Position: Right back

Youth career
- Vila Nova

Senior career*
Years	Team	Apps	(Gls)
2013–2014	Vila Nova	31	(3)
2015–2016	Cruzeiro	0	(0)
2015–2016	→ Boa Esporte (loan)	58	(3)
2017–2022	Grêmio	59	(2)
2023	Atlético Goianiense	3	(0)
- * Club domestic league appearances and goals as of 2 February 2023

Leonardo Gomes da Conceição Silva (born 30 June 1996), known as just Leonardo Gomes, is a Brazilian footballer as a right back.

== Club career ==
Born in Araguaína, Tocantins, Leonardo Gomes finished his formation with Vila Nova. He made his senior debut for the club on 2 June 2013, coming on as a late substitute in a 3–1 Série C home win against Grêmio Barueri.

Leonardo Gomes became a starter for Vila Nova during the 2014 campaign, and scored his first goal on 30 September of that year in a 5–1 home loss against Ceará. On 24 December 2014 he was sold to Cruzeiro, being immediately loaned to Boa Esporte.

On 12 January 2017, after being crowned champions of 2016 Campeonato Brasileiro Série C with Boa, Leonardo Gomes signed for Grêmio.

== Honours ==
Boa Esporte

- Campeonato Brasileiro Série C: 2016

Grêmio

- Copa Libertadores: 2017
- Recopa Sudamericana: 2018
- Campeonato Gaúcho: 2018, 2019, 2021
- Recopa Gaúcha: 2019
