= 2016 Campeonato Gaúcho =

Campeonato Gaúcho
- Season: 2016
- Dates: July 2016

The 2016 Campeonato da Primeira Divisão de Futebol Profissional da FGF (2016 FGF First Division Professional Football Championship), better known as the 2015 Campeonato Gaúcho or Gaúcho, was the 96th edition of the top flight football league of the Brazilian state of Rio Grande do Sul. The season began in January and ends in May.

== Format ==
The tournament was played in four phases:

- 1st phase (qualifying): all 14 teams were in a single group (Group A) and in a single shift. The top 8 placed qualified for the 2nd phase and the bottom three were relegated to[2017 Gaucho Football Championship - Access Division.
- 2nd phase (quarter-finals): contested by the 8 best teams in the 1st phase, in a single game. If the tie persisted at the end of regular time, a penalty shootout would be made to define the semifinalist.
- 3rd phase (semifinal): contested by the 4 winning teams of the 2nd phase, in round robin matches. If there was a tie at the end of both games, the away home rule would be taken into account. If the tie continued, a penalty shootout would be made to determine the finalist.
- 4th phase (final): contested by the 2 teams that won the semifinals, in round robin matches. If a tie persisted at the end of the two games, the away goal rule would be taken into account. If the tie persists, a 30-minute overtime would be applied, divided into 2 periods. If the tie continued, a penalty shootout would be made to define the champion. The top three will compete in the Brazil Football Cup 2017.

== Participating teams ==
Club	Home city
Aimoré	São Leopoldo
Brasil de Pelotas	Pelotas
Cruzeiro	Porto Alegre
Glória	Vacaria
Grêmio	Porto Alegre
Internacional	Porto Alegre
Juventude	Caxias do Sul
Lajeadense	Lajeado
Novo Hamburgo	Novo Hamburgo
Passo Fundo	Passo Fundo
São José-PA	Porto Alegre
São Paulo	Rio Grande
Veranópolis	Veranópolis
Ypiranga	Erechim

== First phase ==
=== League table ===
Pos	Team	Pld	W	D	L	GF	GA	GD	Pts	Qualification or relegation
1	São José-PA	6	5	1	0	11	2	+9	16	Play-offs
2	Juventude	6	5	1	0	12	4	+8	16	Play-offs
3	Grêmio	7	5	0	2	14	9	+5	15	Play-offs
4	São Paulo	7	5	0	2	11	7	+4	15	Play-offs
5	Internacional	6	3	2	1	11	6	+5	11	Play-offs
6	Ypiranga	6	2	2	2	10	7	+3	8	Play-offs
7	Brasil de Pelotas	7	1	5	1	10	11	−1	8	Play-offs
8	Glória	7	1	3	3	9	11	−2	6	Play-offs
9	Passo Fundo	6	2	0	4	5	13	−8	6	
10	Novo Hamburgo	6	1	2	3	2	3	−1	5	
11	Aimoré	6	1	2	3	8	12	−4	5	
12	Lajeadense	6	1	1	4	6	10	−4	4	Relegation to the Série D
13	Veranópolis	6	1	1	4	4	9	−5	4	Relegation to the Série D
14	Cruzeiro	6	0	2	4	3	12	−9	2	Relegation to the Série D

Updated to match(es) played on 28 February 2016. Source: Standings
Rules for classification: 1) points; 2) goal difference; 3) number of goals scored.
