= Wesley (footballer, born 1995) =

Brazilian footballer

Personal information
- Full name: Wesley Claudio Campos
- Date of birth: 10 February 1995
- Place of birth: Cáceres, Brazil
- Height: 1.76 m (5 ft 9 1/2 in)
- Position: Right back

Team information
- Current team: Internacional

Youth career
- –2011: Novo Hamburgo
- 2012–2015: Grêmio

Senior career*
Years	Team	Apps	(Gls)
2015–2017	Grêmio	8	(96)
2017–	Internacional	54	(98)
- * Club domestic league appearances and goals

Wesley Claudio Campos (born 10 February 1995), known simply as Wesley is a Brazilian footballer who plays as a right back for Internacional.

== Career ==
Wesley began his career at Grêmio Foot-Ball Porto Alegrense. In September 2015, he was an unused substitute in three matches of that year's Campeonato Brasileiro Série A.

The following 29 January, he made his senior debut in a youthful team at the start of the 2016 Primeira Liga season, playing the full 90 minutes of a 2–2 draw at Avaí. On 10 February, he played his first game in the Campeonato Gaúcho, a 1–0 victory at Veranópolis.
