= Moisés Gaúcho =

Brazilian footballer

Personal information
- Full name: Moisés Wolschik
- Date of birth: 24 September 1994 (age 32)
- Place of birth: Santa Clara do Sul, Brazil
- Height: 1.81 m (5 ft 11 in)
- Position: Defensive midfielder

Team information
- Current team: Bhayangkara Presisi
- Number: 5

Youth career
- Lajeadense
- 2011–2012: → Fluminense (loan)
- 2013–2014: Grêmio

Senior career*
Years	Team	Apps	(Gls)
2013	Lajeadense	7	(0)
2013–2018	Grêmio	17	(0)
2017	→ Chapecoense (loan)	5	(0)
2018	→ Londrina (loan)	26	(0)
2019–	Juventude	21	(0)
2021–2022	Paraná	12	(0)
2022–2023	Londrina	24	(0)
2023–2025	Zakho	33	(1)
2025–	Bhayangkara Presisi	27	(1)
- * Club domestic league appearances and goals as of 4 May 2026

Moisés Wolschik (born 24 September 1994), known as Moisés Gaúcho is a Brazilian professional footballer who plays as a defensive midfielder for Super League club Bhayangkara Presisi.

== Career ==
=== Lajeadense ===
Moisés Gaúcho began his career at Clube Esportivo Lajeadense in Rio Grande do Sul. On 9 February 2013, he had his first senior call up, remaining an unused substitute in a 1–1 draw at Sport Club ULBRA in that year's Campeonato Gaúcho. Eight days later he made his debut, playing the full 90 minutes of a 3–0 home win over Futebol Clube Santa Cruz as Lajeadense won their group; he totalled four appearances over the season as they finished as runners-up. In the ensuing national season, he totalled seven Campeonato Brasileiro Série D appearances, starting with a 4–4 draw against J. Malucelli Futebol on 1 June.

=== Grêmio ===
On 19 September 2013, Moisés Gaúcho signed for powerhouse Grêmio Foot-Ball Porto Alegrense. He made his debut for them on the following 19 January, playing the full 90 minutes of a 1–0 loss at Esporte Clube São José in the first game of the edition of the state championship; Moisés Gaucho made two other starts that month, his only appearances of a campaign in which his team were runners-up to arch-rivals Sport Club Internacional.

Moisés Gaúcho did not play again until the 2015 Campeonato Brasileiro Série A, coming on in added time in place of Douglas in a 3–1 win over Santos FC at the Estádio Urbano Caldeira; he totalled eight appearances, three of which starts.

== Honours ==
Grêmio

- Copa do Brasil: 2016

Chapecoense

- Campeonato Catarinense: 2017
