= 2025 Esporte Clube Juventude season =

Esporte Clube Juventude
2025 season
- Manager: Fábio Matias (until 11 May); Claudio Tencati (13 May – 29 July); Thiago Carpini (from 4 August)
- Stadium: Estádio Alfredo Jaconi
- Série A: 19th (relegated)
- Campeonato Gaúcho: Semi-finals
- Copa do Brasil: First round
- Top goalscorer: League: Gabriel Taliari (8); All: Gabriel Taliari (10)
- Average home league attendance: 8,060
- Biggest defeat: Flamengo 6–0 Juventude
| Home colours | Away colours | Third colours |

The 2025 season was Esporte Clube Juventude's 113th overall and second consecutive in Brazil's top division. The club also competed in the Campeonato Gaúcho and Copa do Brasil.

== Squad ==
As of 31 March 2025

Note: Flags indicate national team as defined under FIFA eligibility rules; some limited exceptions apply. Players may hold more than one non-FIFA nationality.

| No. | Pos. | Nation | Player |
|---|---|---|---|
| 1 | GK | BRA | Gustavo |
| 2 | DF | BRA | Ewerthon (on loan from Sport Recife) |
| 3 | DF | BRA | Adriano Martins (on loan from Atlético Goianiense) |
| 4 | DF | VEN | Wilker Ángel |
| 5 | DF | BRA | Cipriano (on loan from APOEL) |
| 6 | DF | BRA | Felipinho (on loan from Sport Recife) |
| 7 | FW | BRA | Maurício Garcez (on loan from Avaí) |
| 8 | MF | COL | Daniel Giraldo |
| 9 | FW | BRA | Gilberto |
| 10 | MF | BRA | Nenê |
| 11 | FW | BRA | Giovanny |
| 12 | GK | BRA | Marcão |
| 15 | MF | BRA | Kelvi |
| 16 | MF | BRA | Jadson (captain) |
| 17 | FW | BRA | Matheus Babi |
| 18 | FW | BRA | Emerson Galego |
| 19 | FW | BRA | Gabriel Taliari |
| 20 | MF | BRA | Jean Carlos |
| 21 | GK | BRA | Ruan Carneiro |

| No. | Pos. | Nation | Player |
|---|---|---|---|
| 23 | DF | BRA | Abner |
| 27 | FW | COL | Emerson Batalla (on loan from Talleres) |
| 28 | DF | BRA | Alan Ruschel |
| 31 | GK | BRA | Zé Henrique |
| 34 | DF | BRA | Rodrigo Sam |
| 37 | FW | BRA | Petterson (on loan from Flamengo) |
| 38 | DF | BRA | Kawan (on loan from Botafogo) |
| 44 | MF | BRA | Luis Mandaca |
| 47 | DF | BRA | Marcos Paulo (on loan from Nova Iguaçu) |
| 70 | DF | BRA | Gabriel Souza (on loan from Cianorte) |
| 72 | MF | BRA | Daniel Peixoto (on loan from Rio Claro) |
| 77 | MF | BRA | Luiz Henrique |
| 79 | FW | ECU | Ronie Carrillo |
| 88 | MF | BRA | Davi Goes |
| 93 | DF | BRA | Reginaldo |
| 95 | MF | BRA | Caíque Gonçalves |
| 97 | FW | BRA | Ênio |
| 98 | FW | BRA | Vitor Pernambuco |

=== Youth players ===
Note: Flags indicate national team as defined under FIFA eligibility rules; some limited exceptions apply. Players may hold more than one non-FIFA nationality.

| No. | Pos. | Nation | Player |
|---|---|---|---|
| 43 | DF | BRA | Clébio |
| 99 | FW | BRA | Caíque |

=== Out on loan ===
Note: Flags indicate national team as defined under FIFA eligibility rules; some limited exceptions apply. Players may hold more than one non-FIFA nationality.

| No. | Pos. | Nation | Player |
|---|---|---|---|
| — | GK | BRA | Pedro Bez (at Portimonense until 30 June 2025) |
| — | FW | BRA | Weliton (at Botafogo until 31 July 2025) |

=== Transfers In ===
| Pos. | Player | Transferred from | Fee | Date | Source |
|---|---|---|---|---|---|
| GK | (Brazil) Marcão | (Brazil) Amazonas | Free | 1 January 2025 | |
| FW | (Brazil) Vitor Pernambuco | (United Arab Emirates) Al Dhafra | Free | 6 January 2025 | |
| GK | (Brazil) Gustavo | (Brazil) Criciúma | Undisclosed | 13 January 2025 | |
| FW | (Brazil) Petterson | (Brazil) Flamengo | Loan | 13 January 2025 | |
| MF | (Colombia) Emerson Batalla | (Argentina) Talleres | Loan | 13 January 2025 | |
| DF | (Brazil) Yan Souto | (Brazil) CRB | Loan return | 8 April 2025 | |
| DF | (Brazil) Marcelo Hermes | (Brazil) Criciúma | Loan | 23 June 2025 | |
| FW | (Brazil) Rafael Bilú | (Brazil) Guarani | Free | 26 June 2025 | |
| MF | (Brazil) Hudson | (Brazil) Portuguesa | Loan | 3 July 2025 | |
| MF | (Brazil) Lucas Fernandes | (Portugal) Portimonense | Free | 9 July 2025 | |
| FW | (Brazil) Gabriel Veron | (Portugal) Porto | Loan | 16 July 2025 | |
| GK | (Uruguay) Gastón Guruceaga | (Colombia) Deportivo Cali | Undisclosed | 25 July 2025 | |
| DF | (Brazil) Igor Formiga | (Brazil) Novorizontino | Undisclosed | 13 August 2025 | |
| GK | (Brazil) Jandrei | (Brazil) São Paulo | Loan | 13 August 2025 | |
| DF | (Brazil) Luan Freitas | (Brazil) Fluminense | Loan | 22 August 2025 | |

=== Transfers Out ===
| Pos. | Player | Transferred to | Fee | Date | Source |
|---|---|---|---|---|---|
| DF | (Brazil) Yan Souto | (Brazil) CRB | Loan | 1 January 2025 | |
| DF | (Brazil) Yan Souto | (Brazil) Criciúma | Loan | 11 April 2025 | |
| MF | (Brazil) Jean Carlos | (Brazil) Criciúma | R$500,000 | 9 June 2025 | |
| MF | (Brazil) Kelvi | (Brazil) Guarani | Undisclosed | 10 June 2025 | |
| MF | (Brazil) Davi Goes | (Brazil) Palmeiras U20 | Loan | 12 June 2025 | |
| FW | (Brazil) Vitor Pernambuco | (Brazil) Operário Ferroviário | Undisclosed | 8 July 2025 | |
| GK | (Brazil) Marcão | (Iran) Gol Gohar Sirjan | Contract terminated | 7 August 2025 | |
| GK | (Brazil) Gustavo | (Brazil) América Mineiro | Loan | 22 August 2025 | |

== Exhibition matches ==
| 15 January 2025 | Boca Juniors (Argentina) | 2–0 | (Brazil) Juventude | San Nicolás de los Arroyos |
| 20:00 UTC−3 | Aguirre 15'; Merentiel 50' | | | Stadium: Estadio Único de San Nicolás |

== Competitions ==
=== Overall record ===
| Competition | First match | Last match | Starting round | Final position | Record | | | | | | | |
| Competition | First match | Last match | Starting round | Final position | Pld | W | D | L | GF | GA | GD | Win % |
|---|---|---|---|---|---|---|---|---|---|---|---|---|
| Campeonato Brasileiro Série A | 29 March 2025 | 7 December 2025 | Matchday 1 | 19th | 38 | 9 | 8 | 21 | 35 | 69 | −34 | 23.68 |
| Campeonato Gaúcho | 22 January 2025 | 1 March 2025 | First Stage | Semi-finals | 10 | 7 | 1 | 2 | 17 | 9 | +8 | 70.00 |
| 2025 Copa do Brasil | 25 February 2025 | | First round | First round | 1 | 0 | 0 | 1 | 0 | 1 | −1 | 0.00 |
| Total | | | | | 49 | 16 | 9 | 24 | 52 | 79 | −27 | 32.65 |

Last updated: 7 December 2025
Source: Competitions

=== Série A ===
==== League table ====
| Pos | Team | Pld | W | D | L | GF | GA | GD | Pts | Qualification or relegation |
|---|---|---|---|---|---|---|---|---|---|---|
| 16 | Internacional | 38 | 11 | 11 | 16 | 44 | 57 | −13 | 44 | |
| 17 | Ceará (R) | 38 | 11 | 10 | 17 | 34 | 40 | −6 | 43 | Relegation to Campeonato Brasileiro Série B |
| 18 | Fortaleza (R) | 38 | 11 | 10 | 17 | 44 | 58 | −14 | 43 | Relegation to Campeonato Brasileiro Série B |
| 19 | Juventude (R) | 38 | 9 | 8 | 21 | 35 | 69 | −34 | 35 | Relegation to Campeonato Brasileiro Série B |
| 20 | Sport (R) | 38 | 2 | 11 | 25 | 28 | 75 | −47 | 17 | Relegation to Campeonato Brasileiro Série B |

Source: CBF
Rules for classification: 1) points; 2) wins; 3) goal difference; 4) goals scored; 5) head-to-head results (only between two teams); 6) fewest red cards; 7) fewest yellow cards; 8) drawing of lots.
(R) Relegated

==== Results summary ====
| Overall | | | | | | | | Home | | | | | | Away | | | | | |
| Pld | W | D | L | GF | GA | GD | Pts | W | D | L | GF | GA | GD | W | D | L | GF | GA | GD |
|---|---|---|---|---|---|---|---|---|---|---|---|---|---|---|---|---|---|---|---|
| 38 | 9 | 8 | 21 | 35 | 69 | −34 | 35 | 6 | 5 | 8 | 21 | 26 | −5 | 3 | 3 | 13 | 14 | 43 | −29 |

==== Results by round ====
| Round | 1 | 2 | 3 | 4 | 5 | 6 | 7 | 8 | 9 | 10 | 11 | 12 | 13 | 14 | 15 | 16 | 17 | 18 | 19 | 20 | 21 | 22 | 23 | 24 | 25 | 26 | 27 | 28 | 29 | 30 | 31 | 32 | 33 | 34 | 35 | 36 | 37 | 38 |
|---|---|---|---|---|---|---|---|---|---|---|---|---|---|---|---|---|---|---|---|---|---|---|---|---|---|---|---|---|---|---|---|---|---|---|---|---|---|---|
| Ground | H | A | H | A | H | A | H | A | H | A | H | A | H | H | A | H | A | A | H | A | H | A | H | A | H | A | H | A | H | A | H | A | A | H | A | H | H | A |
| Result | W | L | W | L | D | L | L | L | D | L | L | L | W | W | L | L | L | L | W | D | L | W | L | L | D | D | L | L | W | L | L | W | W | D | L | D | L | D |
| Position | 1 | 8 | 3 | 8 | 9 | 13 | 15 | 18 | 18 | 19 | 19 | 19 | 17 | 14 | 18 | 18 | 19 | 19 | 18 | 18 | 18 | 18 | 18 | 18 | 17 | 18 | 19 | 19 | 18 | 19 | 19 | 19 | 18 | 19 | 19 | 19 | 19 | 19 |

A = Away; H = Home; W = Win; D = Draw; L = Loss

==== Matches ====
| 29 March 2025 1 | Juventude | 2–0 | Vitória | Caxias do Sul |
| 18:30 (UTC-3) | Taliari 8', 52' | Report | | Stadium: Estádio Alfredo Jaconi; Attendance: 6,547; Referee: Paulo Cesar Zanovelli |

| 5 April 2025 2 | Botafogo | 2–0 | Juventude | Rio de Janeiro |
| 21:00 UTC−3 | Igor Jesus 24'; Ponte 62' | Report | | Stadium: Estádio Olímpico Nilton Santos; Referee: Rodrigo José Pereira de Lima |

| 12 April 2025 3 | Juventude | 2–1 | Ceará | Caxias do Sul |
| 17:00 UTC−3 | Mandaca 45+1'; Matheus Babi 68' | Report | Aylon 44' | Stadium: Estádio Alfredo Jaconi |

| 16 April 2025 4 | Flamengo | 6–0 | Juventude | Rio de Janeiro |
| 21:30 UTC−3 | Pulgar 13'; Plata 18'; Danilo 22'; de Arrascaeta 56'; Pedro 71', 81' | Report | | Stadium: Maracanã; Attendance: 31,445; Referee: Matheus Delgado Candançan |

| 20 April 2025 5 | Juventude | 2–2 | Mirassol | Caxias do Sul |
| 11:00 (UTC-3) | Ênio 24'; Batalla 45+2' | Report | Iury Castilho 34'; Reinaldo 72' (pen.) | Stadium: Estádio Alfredo Jaconi |

| 26 April 2025 6 | Internacional | 3–1 | Juventude | Porto Alegre |
| 16:00 | Victor Gabriel 18', 39'; Borré 61' | Report | Batalla 4' | Stadium: Beira-Rio; Referee: Flávio Rodrigues de Souza |

| 5 May 2025 7 | Juventude | 0–1 | Atlético Mineiro | Caxias do Sul |
| 20:00 UTC−3 | | Report | Marcos Paulo 30' (o.g.) | Stadium: Estádio Alfredo Jaconi; Attendance: 7,486; Referee: Bruno Pereira Vasconcelos |

| 10 May 2025 8 | Fortaleza | 5–0 | Juventude | Fortaleza |
| 16:00 (UTC-3) | Lucero 3', 86'; Breno Lopes 63'; Pochettino 82'; Calebe 89' | Report | | Stadium: Castelão |

| 18 May 2025 9 | Juventude | 1–1 | Fluminense | Caxias do Sul |
| 16:00 UTC−3 | Batalla 55' | Report | Hércules 58' | Stadium: Estádio Alfredo Jaconi |

| 26 May 2025 10 | Red Bull Bragantino | 1–0 | Juventude | Bragança Paulista |
| 20:00 UTC−3 | Jhon Jhon 45+4' | Report | | Stadium: Estádio Cícero de Souza Marques |

| 1 June 2025 11 | Juventude | 0–2 | Grêmio | Caxias do Sul |
| 16:00 UTC−3 | | Report | Braithwaite 13' (pen.); Olivera 38' | Stadium: Estádio Alfredo Jaconi; Attendance: 9,098; Referee: Raphael Claus |

| 14 July 2025 12 | Juventude | 2–0 | Sport | Caxias do Sul |
| 20:00 UTC−3 | Gilberto 12', 49' | | | Stadium: Estádio Alfredo Jaconi; Attendance: 6,134; Referee: Jefferson Ferreira de Moraes |

| 20 July 2025 15 | Cruzeiro | 4–0 | Juventude | Belo Horizonte |
| 16:00 UTC−3 | Christian 39'; Gabriel 51', 63' (pen.); Carlos Eduardo 90+2' | Report | | Stadium: Mineirão; Attendance: 52,850; Referee: Lucas Casagrande |

| 24 July 2025 16 | Juventude | 0–1 | São Paulo | Caxias do Sul |
| 19:00 UTC−3 | | Report | Luciano 85' | Stadium: Estádio Alfredo Jaconi; Attendance: 6,095; Referee: Sávio Pereira Sampaio |

| 27 July 2025 17 | Bahia | 3–0 | Juventude | Salvador |
| 18:30 (UTC-3) | Jean Lucas 27', 58'; Rodríguez 90+3' | Report | | Stadium: Arena Fonte Nova |

| 4 August 2025 18 | Santos | 3–1 | Juventude | São Paulo |
| 20:00 UTC-03:00 | Neymar 37', 80' (pen.); Barreal 40' | Report | Ángel 45+1' | Stadium: Morumbi; Attendance: 37,485; Referee: Paulo César Zanovelli da Silva |

| 11 August 2025 19 | Juventude | 2–1 | Corinthians | Caxias do Sul |
| 20:00 UTC−3 | Gabriel Taliari 27'; Matheus Babi 81' | Report | Matheuzinho 90' | Stadium: Estádio Alfredo Jaconi; Attendance: 8,679; Referee: Lucas Casagrande |

| 16 August 2025 20 | Vitória | 2–2 | Juventude | Salvador |
| 18:30 UTC−3 | Renato Kayzer 32', 46' | Report | Igor Formiga 81'; Nenê 90+10' (pen.) | Stadium: Barradão |

| 20 August 2025 14 | Juventude | 2–0 | Vasco da Gama | Caxias do Sul |
| 19:00 UTC−3 | Nenê 3'; Gabriel Taliari 16' | Report | | Stadium: Estádio Alfredo Jaconi |

| 24 August 2025 21 | Juventude | 1–3 | Botafogo | Caxias do Sul |
| 18:30 UTC−3 | | | | Stadium: Estádio Alfredo Jaconi; Referee: Flavio Rodrigues de Souza |

| 30 August 2025 22 | Ceará | 0–1 | Juventude |
| 16:00 |

| 14 September 2025 23 | Juventude | 0–2 | Flamengo |
| 16:00 |

| 21 September 2025 24 | Mirassol | 2–0 | Juventude |
| 16:00 |

| 26 September 2025 25 | Juventude | 1–1 | Internacional |
| 18:30 |

| 30 September 2025 26 | Atlético Mineiro | 0–0 | Juventude |
| 21:30 |

| 5 October 2025 27 | Juventude | 1–2 | Fortaleza |
| 18:30 |

| 11 October 2025 12 | Palmeiras | 4–1 | Juventude |
| 19:00 |

| 16 October 2025 28 | Fluminense | 1–0 | Juventude |
| 21:30 |

| 20 October 2025 29 | Juventude | 1–0 | Red Bull Bragantino |
| 19:00 |

| 26 October 2025 30 | Grêmio | 3–1 | Juventude |
| 16:00 |

| 2 November 2025 31 | Juventude | 0–2 | Palmeiras |
| 18:30 |

| 5 November 2025 32 | Sport | 0–2 | Juventude |
| 19:00 |

| 8 November 2025 33 | Vasco da Gama | 1–3 | Juventude |
| 18:00 |

| 20 November 2025 34 | Juventude | 3–3 | Cruzeiro |
| 16:00 |

| 23 November 2025 35 | São Paulo | 2–1 | Juventude |
| 16:00 |

| 28 November 2025 36 | Juventude | 1–1 | Bahia |
| 19:00 |

| 3 December 2025 37 | Juventude | 0–3 | Santos |
| 19:30 |

| 7 December 2025 38 | Cruzeiro | 1–1 | Juventude |
| 16:00 |

=== Campeonato Gaúcho ===
==== Group stage ====
| Pos | Team | Pld | W | D | L | GF | GA | GD | Pts | Qualification or relegation |
|---|---|---|---|---|---|---|---|---|---|---|
| 1 | Juventude | 8 | 6 | 1 | 1 | 14 | 6 | +8 | 19 | Knockout stage |
| 2 | São Luiz | 8 | 2 | 3 | 3 | 7 | 13 | −6 | 9 | |
| 3 | Monsoon | 8 | 2 | 1 | 5 | 7 | 14 | −7 | 7 | |
| 4 | Brasil de Pelotas | 8 | 1 | 4 | 3 | 5 | 10 | −5 | 7 | Relegation stage |

Source: FGF

===== Results by round =====
| Round | 1 |
|---|---|
| Ground | H |
| Result | |
| Position | |

A = Away; H = Home; W = Win; D = Draw; L = Loss

===== Matches =====
| 22 January 2025 1 | Juventude | 2–0 | Ypiranga | Caxias do Sul |
| 17:30 UTC−3 | | | | Stadium: Estádio Alfredo Jaconi |

| 25 January 2025 2 | Internacional | 2–0 | Juventude |

| 28 January 2025 3 | Juventude | 1–0 | Guarany | Caxias do Sul |
| | | | | Stadium: Estádio Alfredo Jaconi |

| 1 February 2025 4 | Caxias | 0–2 | Juventude |

| 5 February 2025 5 | Juventude | 2–0 | Grêmio | Caxias do Sul |
| | | | | Stadium: Estádio Alfredo Jaconi |

| 9 February 2025 6 | Juventude | 3–1 | São José | Caxias do Sul |
| | | | | Stadium: Estádio Alfredo Jaconi |

| 12 February 2025 7 | Avenida | 1–1 | Juventude |

| 15 February 2025 8 | Pelotas | 2–3 | Juventude |

==== Semi-finals ====
| 22 February 2025 First Leg | Grêmio | 2–1 | Juventude | Porto Alegre |
| 21:30 | Braithwaite 13'; Cristian Olivera 52' | Report | Batalla 33' | Stadium: Arena do Grêmio; Attendance: 26,072; Referee: Jonathan Benkenstein Pinheiro |

| 1 March 2025 Second Leg | Juventude | 2–1 (2–3 p) | Grêmio | Caxias do Sul |
| 16:30 | Adriano Martins 67'; Mandaca 85' | Report | Gustavo Martins 90+7' | Stadium: Alfredo Jaconi; Attendance: 12,821; Referee: Anderson Daronco |
| | Penalties |
| | Nenê (penalty missed); Giovanny (penalty scored); Jadson (penalty scored); Alan Ruschel (penalty missed); Ênio (penalty missed) | | Wagner Leonardo (penalty scored); Pavon (penalty missed); Arezo (penalty scored); Volpi (penalty scored); Villasanti (penalty missed) |

=== Copa do Brasil ===
| 25 February 2025 First Round | Maringá | 1–0 | Juventude | Maringá |
| 19:30 | Cauã 18' | Report | | Stadium: Estádio Willie Davids; Attendance: 7,868; Referee: Gustavo Ervino Bauermann (Santa Catarina) |
