= 2025 Campeonato Gaúcho =

Campeonato Gaúcho
- Season: 2024
- Dates: 22 January – 16 March 2025
- Teams: 12
- Champions: Internacional
- Relegated: Pelotas; Brasil de Pelotas
- Matches: 72
- Goals: 165 (2.29 per match)
- Top goalscorer: Emerson Galego (8 goals)

The 2025 Campeonato da Primeira Divisão de Futebol Profissional da FGF - Divisão Especial - Série A1, better known as the 2025 Campeonato Gaúcho (officially the Gauchão Superbet 2025 for sponsorship reasons), was the 105th season of Rio Grande do Sul's top flight football league. The competition was played from 22 January to 16 March 2025, with 12 clubs contesting the tournament.

Grêmio are the seven-time defending champions.

== Format ==
The 2025 edition underwent a major revision to the rules, changing the format of the competition. The 12 teams were divided into three groups of four teams each, defined by drawing lots, with the three teams from the 2025 Campeonato Brasileiro Série A as the seeded teams in each group (Grêmio, Internacional and Juventude). During the first phase, each team will face teams from the other groups in a single round, totaling eight matches. The best-placed team in each group, along with the best second-placed team, will advance to the semi-finals.

The semifinals and final will be played in two-legged matches, without the qualifying goal difference criterion. In the event of a tie in goal difference at the end of the match, the decision will be made through penalty kicks. The video assistant referee will to be used from the semi-finals onwards.

The spots for the 2026 Copa do Brasil and the 2026 Campeonato Brasileiro Série D will be decided through a quadrangular tournament – Taça Farroupilha –, to be played between the teams that place between fifth and eighth in the overall standings. The teams that place between ninth and twelfth will play in the relegation quadrangular, where the last two placed teams will be relegated to the 2026 Série A2. In both quadrangulars, all teams will face each other in one round, totaling three matches each.

This was the solution agreed between the Federação Gaúcha de Futebol and the clubs to adjust the state calendar to the Brazilian Football Confederation schedule in 2025, which foresees the 2025 Campeonato Brasileiro Série A from March to December and a break for the 2025 FIFA Club World Cup, scheduled to take place between 14 June and 13 July.

== Teams ==
A total of 12 teams competed in the 2025 Série A1 season.

Club	City	Stadium	Capacity	Pos. in 2024	1st season	Titles	Last title	First title
Avenida	Santa Cruz do Sul	Estádio dos Eucaliptos	3,600	10th	1979	—	—	—
Brasil de Pelotas	Pelotas	Bento Freitas	10,500	7th	1919	1	1919	1919
Caxias	Caxias do Sul	Centenário	22,132	4th	1961	1	2000	2000
Grêmio	Porto Alegre	Arena do Grêmio	55,662	1st	1919	43	2024	1922
Guarany de Bagé	Bagé	Estrela D'Alva	10,000	5th	1919	2	1938	1920
Internacional	Porto Alegre	Beira-Rio	50,128	3rd	1927	45	2016	1927
Juventude	Caxias do Sul	Alfredo Jaconi	19,924	2nd	1925	1	1998	1998
Monsoon	Porto Alegre	Estádio do Vale	5,196	1st (2nd division)	2025	—	—	—
Pelotas	Pelotas	Boca do Lobo	15,478	2nd (2nd division)	1925	1	1930	1930
São José	Porto Alegre	Passo D'Areia	10,646	6th	1961	—	—	—
São Luiz	Ijuí	19 de Outubro	5,217	8th	1974	—	—	—
Ypiranga	Erechim	Colosso da Lagoa	22,000	9th	1968	—	—	—

Location of teams in 2025 Campeonato Gaúcho

=== Personnel ===
Club	Head coach
Avenida	William Campos
Brasil de Pelotas	William De Mattia
Caxias	Luizinho Vieira
Grêmio	Gustavo Quinteros
Guarany de Bagé	Márcio Nunes
Internacional	Roger Machado
Juventude	Fábio Matias
Monsoon	Christian Souza
Pelotas	Ariel Lanzini
São José	Rogério Zimmermann
São Luiz	Alessandro Telles
Ypiranga	Matheus Costa

== First stage ==
=== Group A ===
Pos	Team	Pld	W	D	L	GF	GA	GD	Pts	Qualification or relegation
1	Grêmio	8	5	2	1	19	3	+16	17	Knockout stage
2	Guarany de Bagé	8	2	3	3	6	6	0	9	
3	São José	8	0	5	3	5	10	−5	5	Relegation stage
4	Avenida	8	0	3	5	4	9	−5	3	Relegation stage

Source: FGF

=== Group B ===
Pos	Team	Pld	W	D	L	GF	GA	GD	Pts	Qualification or relegation
1	Internacional	8	6	2	0	16	4	+12	20	Knockout stage
2	Caxias	8	4	2	2	8	9	−1	14	Knockout stage
3	Ypiranga	8	3	3	2	6	6	0	12	
4	Pelotas	8	1	3	4	6	13	−7	6	Relegation stage

Source: FGF

=== Group C ===
Pos	Team	Pld	W	D	L	GF	GA	GD	Pts	Qualification or relegation
1	Juventude	8	6	1	1	14	6	+8	19	Knockout stage
2	São Luiz	8	2	3	3	7	13	−6	9	
3	Monsoon	8	2	1	5	7	14	−7	7	
4	Brasil de Pelotas	8	1	4	3	5	10	−5	7	Relegation stage

Source: FGF

== Relegation stage ==
=== Standings and Results ===
Pos	Team	Pld	W	D	L	GF	GA	GD	Pts	Relegation	AVE	SJO	PEL	BRA
1	Avenida	6	3	2	1	11	7	+4	11			3–2	4–1	1–1
2	São José	6	3	1	2	11	10	+1	10		1–0		2–2	2–1
3	Pelotas (R)	6	1	3	2	7	10	−3	6	Relegation to Série A2	2–2	2–1		0–0
4	Brasil de Pelotas (R)	6	1	2	3	5	7	−2	5	Relegation to Série A2	0–1	2–3	1–0	

Source: FGF
Legend: Blue = home team win; Yellow = draw; Red = away team win.
(R) Relegated

== Troféu Farroupilha ==
=== Bracket ===
Semi-finals
C3	Monsoon	1	1	2 (3)
B3	Ypiranga (p)	1	1	2 (5)
C2	São Luiz	0	2	2
A2	Guarany de Bagé	1	0	1

Final
B3	Ypiranga	2	2	4
C2	São Luiz	0	1	1

== Knockout stage ==
=== Semi-finals ===
The first legs was played on 22 February 2025, and the second legs was played on 1 March 2025.

Team 1	Agg.	Team 2	1st leg	2nd leg
Internacional	5–1	Caxias	2–0	3–1
Juventude	3–3 (2–3 p)	Grêmio	1–2	2–1

==== Match C1 ====
22 February 2025
16:30

Caxias	0–2	Internacional
	Report	Vitinho 67', 73'

Centenário, Caxias do Sul
Attendance: 9,073
Referee: Jean Pierre Gonçalves Lima

1 March 2025
21:30

Internacional	3–1	Caxias
Valencia 57' (pen.), 79'; Vitinho 63'	Report	Tomas Bastos 41' (pen.)

Beira-Rio, Porto Alegre
Attendance: 30,454
Referee: Roger Goulart

Internacional advances to the finals.

==== Match C2 ====
22 February 2025
21:30

Grêmio	2–1	Juventude
Braithwaite 13'; Cristian Olivera 52'	Report	Batalla 33'

Arena do Grêmio, Porto Alegre
Attendance: 26,072
Referee: Jonathan Benkenstein Pinheiro

1 March 2025
16:30

Juventude	2–1	Grêmio
Adriano Martins 67'; Mandaca 85'	Report	Gustavo Martins 90+7'
Penalties
Nenê (penalty missed); Giovanny (penalty scored); Jadson (penalty scored); Alan Ruschel (penalty missed); Ênio (penalty missed)	2–3	Wagner Leonardo (penalty scored); Pavon (penalty missed); Arezo (penalty scored); Volpi (penalty scored); Villasanti (penalty missed)

Alfredo Jaconi, Caxias do Sul
Attendance: 12,821
Referee: Anderson Daronco

Grêmio advances to the finals.

=== Finals ===
The first legs was played on 8 March 2025, and the second legs was played on 16 March 2025.

Team 1	Agg.	Team 2	1st leg	2nd leg
Internacional	3–1	Grêmio	2–0	1–1

==== Match G1 ====
===== First leg =====
8 March 2025
17:45

Grêmio	0–2	Internacional
	Report	Carbonero 23'; Alan Patrick 26'

Arena do Grêmio, Porto Alegre
Attendance: 51,077
Referee: Ramon Abatti Abel

===== Second leg =====
16 March 2025
16:00

Internacional	1–1	Grêmio
Valencia 56'	Report	Wagner Leonardo 62'

Beira-Rio, Porto Alegre
Attendance: 49,295
Referee: Marcelo de Lima Henrique

== Statistics ==
=== Top scorers ===
Rank	Player	Club	Goal
1	(Brazil) Emerson Galego	Ypiranga	8
2	(Denmark) Martin Braithwaite	Grêmio	6
3	(Brazil) Caíque	Avenida	5
3	(Brazil) Giovane Gomes	São José	5
3	(Brazil) Vitinho	Internacional	5
3	(Ecuador) Enner Valencia	Internacional	5
