= 2024 Campeonato Gaúcho =

Campeonato Gaúcho
- Season: 2024
- Dates: 20 January – 6 April 2024
- Teams: 12
- Champions: Grêmio
- Relegated: Novo Hamburgo; Santa Cruz
- Matches: 76
- Goals: 165 (2.17 per match)
- Top goalscorer: Diego Costa; Franco Cristaldo (6 goals each)

The 2024 Campeonato da Primeira Divisão de Futebol Profissional da FGF - Divisão Especial - Série A1, better known as the 2024 Campeonato Gaúcho (officially the Gauchão Ipiranga 2024 for sponsorship reasons), was the 104th season of Rio Grande do Sul's top flight football league. The competition was played from 20 January to 6 April 2024, with 12 clubs contesting the tournament.

Grêmio are the six-time defending champions.

== Format ==
In the first phase, the 12 clubs will play against each other once, with the top eight teams qualifying to the quarterfinals. In the quarterfinals, the top four teams will play at home against the other four clubs in a single match, with the winners advancing to a two-legged semifinals. The winners advance to the finals, also played in two legs.

VAR will be used from the quarterfinals onwards.

== Teams ==
A total of 12 teams competed in the 2024 Série A1 season.

Club	City	Stadium	Capacity	Pos. in 2023	1st season	Titles	Last title	First title
Avenida	Santa Cruz do Sul	Estádio dos Eucaliptos	20,000	8th	1979	—	—	—
Brasil de Pelotas	Pelotas	Bento Freitas	18,000	4th	1919	1	1919	1919
Caxias	Caxias do Sul	Centenário	22,132	5th	1961	1	2000	2000
Grêmio	Porto Alegre	Arena do Grêmio	55,225	1st	1919	42	2023	1922
Guarany de Bagé	Bagé	Estrela D'Alva	10,000	2nd (2nd division)	1919	2	1938	1920
Internacional	Porto Alegre	Beira-Rio	50,128	3rd	1927	45	2016	1927
Juventude	Caxias do Sul	Alfredo Jaconi	23,726	10th	1925	1	1998	1998
Novo Hamburgo	Novo Hamburgo	Estádio do Vale	6,500	7th	1930	1	2017	2017
Santa Cruz	Santa Cruz do Sul	Plátanos	3,500	1st (2nd division)	1932	—	—	—
São José	Porto Alegre	Passo D'Areia	8,000	6th	1961	—	—	—
São Luiz	Ijuí	19 de Outubro	14,000	9th	1974	—	—	—
Ypiranga	Erechim	Colosso da Lagoa	30,000	2nd	1968	—	—	—

Location of teams in 2024 Campeonato Gaúcho

=== Personnel ===
Club	Head coach
Avenida	Márcio Nunes
Brasil de Pelotas	Fabiano Daitx
Caxias	Argel Fuchs
Grêmio	Renato Portaluppi
Guarany de Bagé	Wiliam Campos
Internacional	Eduardo Coudet
Juventude	Roger Machado
Novo Hamburgo	Edinho Rosa
Santa Cruz	Iarley
São José	China Balbino
São Luiz	Alessandro Telles
Ypiranga	Thiago Carvalho

== First stage ==
=== Table ===
Pos	Team	Pld	W	D	L	GF	GA	GD	Pts	Qualification or relegation
1	Internacional	11	9	1	1	21	7	+14	28	Qualification to Knockout stage
2	Grêmio	11	7	2	2	23	10	+13	23	Qualification to Knockout stage
3	Caxias	11	4	4	3	15	14	+1	16	Qualification to Knockout stage
4	Guarany de Bagé	11	4	4	3	12	15	−3	16	Qualification to Knockout stage
5	Juventude	11	4	3	4	15	9	+6	15	Qualification to Knockout stage
6	São José	11	3	6	2	11	10	+1	15	Qualification to Knockout stage
7	Brasil de Pelotas	11	3	6	2	9	8	+1	15	Qualification to Knockout stage
8	São Luiz	11	2	7	2	9	9	0	13	Qualification to Knockout stage
9	Ypiranga	11	1	7	3	7	14	−7	10	
10	Avenida	11	2	3	6	5	10	−5	9	
11	Novo Hamburgo (R)	11	2	3	6	6	15	−9	9	Relegation to Série A2
12	Santa Cruz (R)	11	0	4	7	8	20	−12	4	Relegation to Série A2

Source: Soccerway
Rules for classification: 1) Points; 2) Wins; 3) Goal difference; 4) Goals scored; 5) fewest red cards; 6) fewest yellow cards; 7) Draw in the headquarters of the FGF.
(R) Relegated

=== Results ===
Home \ Away	AVE	BRA	CAX	GRE	GUA	INT	JUV	NHA	STA	SJO	SLU	YPI
Avenida		0–0		0–1	0–1					0–0		2–0
Brasil de Pelotas				0–1	1–1		1–0	0–0	2–0	0–0		
Caxias	2–0	1–2		2–1					2–1	1–2	2–2	
Grêmio					4–1		1–0	2–0	6–2	4–1	1–1	
Guarany de Bagé			1–1			2–1		2–0			1–0	1–2
Internacional	1–0	3–1	2–0	3–2								3–0
Juventude	3–1		1–1		4–0	1–2						3–0
Novo Hamburgo	0–1		0–1			1–3	1–1		2–1		1–0	
Santa Cruz	1–1				1–1	0–2	0–1			1–1		1–1
São José					1–1	0–1	1–0	3–0			1–1	
São Luiz	1–0	2–2				0–0	1–1		1–0			0–0
Ypiranga		0–0	2–2	0–0				1–1		1–1		

Source: Soccerway
Legend: Blue = home team win; Yellow = draw; Red = away team win.
For upcoming matches, an "a" indicates there is an article about the rivalry between the two participants.

=== Positions by matchday ===
The table lists the positions of teams after each matchday.

Team ╲ Round	1	2	3	4	5	6	7	8	9	10	11
Internacional	3	5	1	2	2	2	1	1	1	1	1
Grêmio	9	6	3	1	1	1	2	2	2	2	2
Caxias	1	3	4	5	8	8	5	7	7	7	3
Guarany de Bagé	10	12	12	11	9	9	10	5	4	3	4
Juventude	4	1	2	3	3	3	3	3	3	4	5
São José	5	10	8	9	7	7	9	6	6	5	6
Brasil de Pelotas	7	8	10	7	4	4	4	4	5	6	7
São Luiz	6	7	9	4	6	6	7	9	8	8	8
Ypiranga	2	2	7	8	10	10	11	11	11	10	9
Avenida	11	9	6	10	11	11	8	10	10	11	10
Novo Hamburgo	8	4	5	6	5	5	6	8	9	9	11
Santa Cruz	12	11	11	12	12	12	12	12	12	12	12

Qualification to Knockout stage
Relegation to Série A2

Source: Soccerway

== Knockout stage ==
=== Quarter-finals ===
The matches was played on 8–10 March 2024.

Team 1	Score	Team 2
Internacional	3−0	São Luiz
Grêmio	2−0	Brasil de Pelotas
Caxias	1−0	São José
Guarany de Bagé	0−4	Juventude

9 March 2024
16:30 UTC-03:00

Internacional	3–0	São Luiz
Valencia 5'; Igor Gomes 17'; Maurício 84'	Report

Beira-Rio, Porto Alegre
Attendance: 41,690
Referee: Francisco Soares Dias

Internacional advances to the Semi-finals.

10 March 2024
18:30 UTC-03:00

Grêmio	2–0	Brasil de Pelotas
Cristaldo 45+1'; Diego Costa 69'	Report

Arena do Grêmio, Porto Alegre
Attendance: 31,056
Referee: Jonathan Benkenstein Pinheiro

Grêmio advances to the Semi-finals.

8 March 2024
19:00 UTC-03:00

Caxias	1–0	São José
Vitor Feijão 4'	Report

Centenário, Caxias do Sul
Attendance: 3,585
Referee: Douglas Schwengber da Silva

Caxias advances to the Semi-finals.

9 March 2024
19:30 UTC-03:00

Guarany de Bagé	0–4	Juventude
	Report	Gilberto 47', 67'; Jean Carlos 66'; Rildo 90+3'

Estrela D'Alva, Bagé
Attendance: 2,303
Referee: Rafael Rodrigo Klein

Juventude advances to the Semi-finals.

=== Semi-finals ===
The first legs was played on 16–17 March 2024, and the second legs was played on 25–26 March 2024.

Team 1	Agg.	Team 2	1st leg	2nd leg
Internacional	1–1 (5–6 p)	Juventude	0–0	1–1
Grêmio	5–3	Caxias	2–1	3–2

==== Match C1 ====
17 March 2024
16:00

Juventude	0–0	Internacional
	Report

Alfredo Jaconi, Caxias do Sul
Attendance: 12,306
Referee: Lucas Guimarães Rechatiko Horn

25 March 2024
21:45

Internacional	1–1	Juventude
Renê 55'	Report	Zé Marcos 31'
Penalties
Alan Patrick (penalty scored); Renê (penalty scored); Mercado (penalty missed); Wanderson (penalty scored); Valencia (penalty scored); Bruno Gomes (penalty scored); Robert Renan (penalty missed)	5–6	Gilberto (penalty scored); Alan Ruschel (penalty missed); Rildo (penalty scored); Jadson (penalty scored); Nenê (penalty scored); Kleiton (penalty scored); Kelvi (penalty scored)

Beira-Rio, Porto Alegre
Attendance: 45,199
Referee: Anderson Daronco

Juventude advances to the finals.

==== Match C2 ====
16 March 2024
16:30

Caxias	1–2	Grêmio
Du Queiroz 76' (o.g.)	Report	Cristaldo 21'; Diego Costa 68' (pen.)

Centenário, Caxias do Sul
Attendance: 5,510
Referee: Roger Goulart

26 March 2024
21:00

Grêmio	3–2	Caxias
Diego Costa 21', 39'; Cristaldo 30'	Report	Vitor Feijão 59'; Tomas Bastos 82'

Arena do Grêmio, Porto Alegre
Attendance: 36,958
Referee: Jean Pierre Gonçalves Lima

Grêmio advances to the finals.

=== Finals ===
The first legs was played on 30 March 2024, and the second legs was played on 6 April 2024.

Team 1	Agg.	Team 2	1st leg	2nd leg
Grêmio	3–1	Juventude	0–0	3–1

==== Match G1 ====
===== First leg =====
30 March 2024
16:30

Juventude	0–0	Grêmio
	Report

Alfredo Jaconi, Caxias do Sul
Attendance: 18,413
Referee: Anderson Daronco

===== Second leg =====
6 April 2024
16:30

Grêmio	3–1	Juventude
Cristaldo 42'; Diego Costa 44'; Nathan Fernandes 87'	Report	Gilberto 5'

Arena do Grêmio, Porto Alegre
Attendance: 54,158
Referee: Rafael Rodrigo Klein

== Overall table ==
Pos	Team	Pld	W	D	L	GF	GA	GD	Pts	Qualification or relegation
1	Grêmio (C)	16	11	3	2	33	14	+19	36	Champions
2	Juventude	16	5	6	5	21	13	+8	21	Runners-up
3	Internacional	14	10	3	1	25	8	+17	33	
4	Caxias	14	5	4	5	19	19	0	19	
5	Guarany de Bagé	12	4	4	4	12	19	−7	16	
6	São José	12	3	6	3	11	11	0	15	
7	Brasil de Pelotas	12	3	6	3	9	10	−1	15	
8	São Luiz	12	2	7	3	9	12	−3	13	
9	Ypiranga	11	1	7	3	7	14	−7	10	
10	Avenida	11	2	3	6	5	10	−5	9	
11	Novo Hamburgo (R)	11	2	3	6	6	15	−9	9	Relegation to Série A2
12	Santa Cruz (R)	11	0	4	7	8	20	−12	4	Relegation to Série A2

Source: Soccerway
Rules for classification: 1) Points; 2) Wins; 3) Goal difference; 4) Goals scored; 5) fewest red cards; 6) fewest yellow cards; 7) Draw in the headquarters of the FGF.
(C) Champions; (R) Relegated

== Statistics ==
=== Top scorers ===
Rank	Player	Club	Goal
1	(Spain) Diego Costa	Grêmio	6
1	(Argentina) Franco Cristaldo	Grêmio	6
2	(Brazil) Michel	Guarany de Bagé	5
