= Gabriel Taliari =

Brazilian footballer (born 1997)

Personal information
- Full name: Gabriel Pereira Taliari
- Date of birth: 13 April 1997 (age 29)
- Place of birth: Arceburgo, Brazil
- Height: 1.76 m (5 ft 9 in)
- Position: Forward

Team information
- Current team: Remo
- Number: 19

Youth career
- 2012: Radium
- 2015: EC São Bernardo
- 2016–2017: Capivariano

Senior career*
Years	Team	Apps	(Gls)
2015	EC São Bernardo	25	(5)
2016–2023	Capivariano	34	(21)
2017	→ Água Santa (loan)	0	(0)
2018–2019	→ Athletico Paranaense (loan)	8	(1)
2019	→ Mirassol (loan)	0	(0)
2020–2021	→ Ituano (loan)	45	(10)
2021–2022	→ Brusque (loan)	25	(2)
2023	→ Santo André (loan)	12	(3)
2023	→ CSA (loan)	14	(5)
2023	→ Juventude (loan)	11	(6)
2024–2026	Juventude	70	(14)
2026–	Remo	3	(2)
- * Club domestic league appearances and goals as of 03:58, 4 April 2026 (UTC)

Gabriel Pereira Taliari (born 13 April 1997), known as Gabriel Taliari, is a Brazilian professional footballer who plays as a forward for Remo.

== Early life ==
Born in Arceburgo, Minas Gerais, he grew up in nearby Mococa, São Paulo, where he began his career going by the nickname Bill in the youth ranks of Radium, for whom he was the club's top scorer in the 2012 Campeonato Paulista Sub-15.

== Career ==
=== EC São Bernardo ===
In 2015, Taliari joined Campeonato Paulista Segunda Divisão side EC São Bernardo, making his senior debut on 17 April, playing the full 90 minutes and scoring the game-tying goal in a 1–1 home draw against local rivals Mauaense. He scored a further four goals during the tournament (against Manthiqueira, Guarulhos (twice), and Lemense) in 25 total appearances as the club finished in fifth place overall.

=== Capivariano ===
Taliari's performances with São Bernardo allowed him a move to Campeonato Paulista side Capivariano for the 2016 season. With his team already relegated, he made his club debut on 10 April of that year, as a substitute for Vicente in a 2–1 defeat to Botafogo-SP. He was subsequently sent to the under-20 team, helping them to reach the Campeonato Paulista Sub-20 finals, losing to São Paulo.

After playing in the 2017 Copa São Paulo de Futebol Júnior, Taliari was promoted back to the first team for the year's Campeonato Paulista Série A2, where he scored his first goal for the club on 1 March, in a 2–1 win at Guarani. After scoring another four goals in the latter tournament but being unable to prevent another relegation, he briefly played for the under-20 team before being loaned out to Água Santa for the Copa Paulista.

Back to the Leão da Sorocabana for the 2018 campaign, Taliari scored 16 times in the Campeonato Paulista Série A3 and was named the tournament's top goalscorer.

==== Loan to Athletico Paranaense ====
On 30 April 2018, Série A side Atlético Paranaense announced it had signed Taliari on a one-year loan deal from Capivariano. He made his top tier debut on 20 May, replacing Matheus Rossetto late into a 2–0 away loss to Fluminense.

After two further first team appearances, Taliari ended the year featuring with Atlético's under-23 team in the Campeonato Brasileiro de Aspirantes, before being also rarely used in the 2019 Campeonato Paranaense, where the club – now called Athletico – also played with their under-23s. He played his first game of the season on 30 January 2019, coming on as a substitute during a 1–2 Atletiba loss at Arena da Baixada. He scored his maiden goal for the club on 6 April, netting the club's third through a bicycle kick in a 3–0 win over Rio Branco.

==== Loan to Mirassol ====
Following the end of his loan spell at Athletico, Taliari joined Mirassol also on loan, at the request of head coach Ricardo Catalá. Following advice from his agent, he stopped using the nickname Bill and began to be known as Gabriel Taliari in an attempt to get Italian citizenship.

Taliari scored four goals in a 5–0 win over Batatais on 30 June 2019, He scored against the same opponent once more on 4 August, a match Mirassol won 6–0. and finished the season as Mirassol's top scorer with 10 goals in 23 games as they were knocked out in the semifinals.

==== Loan to Ituano ====
With two years remaining in his deal with Capivariano, on 19 December 2019, Taliari was loaned for six months to Ituano. Regularly used, his loan was extended until the end of the year on 11 June, due to the COVID-19 pandemic.

Taliari also played in the 2021 Paulistão, scoring twice against Santo André on 13 May of that year.

==== Loan to Brusque ====
On 4 June 2021, Taliari was signed on loan by Série B side Brusque until the end of the season. He made his debut nine days later, coming off the bench and scoring a penalty kick in a 2–1 away win over Avaí. In July, however, he suffered an anterior cruciate ligament injury which sidelined him for the remainder of the year.

Taliari's loan was extended for a further year on 27 December 2021, to cover his recovery, and he returned to action more than a year later, on 16 July 2022, playing for Brusque in a Série B fixture against CRB.

==== Loan to Santo André ====
On 13 December 2022, Taliari was announced at Santo André on loan for the 2023 Campeonato Paulista. He was the club's top scorer in the competition with three goals, as they were knocked out in the quarterfinals.

==== Loan to CSA ====
Taliari moved to CSA also in a temporary deal on 14 March 2023, and scored on his club debut against former side Brusque two days later. An immediate first-choice, he scored seven times in 17 matches for the club.

=== Juventude ===
On 25 August 2023, Taliari agreed to join Juventude in the second division, also on loan. After helping the club to achieve top tier promotion by scoring six goals in just 11 matches, he signed a permanent three-year deal with the club on 12 December.

After struggling with knee problems in the 2024 pre-season, Taliari underwent surgery, and only featured for the first time in the year in June. After a setback in August, he spent another two months out before returning to action in October.

During the 2025 season, Taliari became a starter in the 2025 Série A, scoring eight goals but being unable to prevent team relegation.

=== Remo ===
On 18 March 2026, Taliari joined Remo also in the top tier, signing a three-year contract for a rumoured fee of R$ 5 million.

== Career statistics ==
As of 4 April 2026

Club	Season	League			State League		Cup		Continental		Other		Total	
Club	Season	Division	Apps	Goals	Apps	Goals	Apps	Goals	Apps	Goals	Apps	Goals	Apps	Goals
EC São Bernardo	2015	Paulista 2ª Divisão	—		25	5	—		—		—		25	5
Capivariano	2016	Paulista	—		1	0	—		—		—		1	0
Capivariano	2017	Paulista A2	—		12	5	—		—		—		12	5
Capivariano	2018	Paulista A3	—		21	16	—		—		—		21	16
Capivariano	Subtotal		—		34	21	—		—		—		34	21
Água Santa (loan)	2017	Paulista A2	—		—		—		—		11 (Note: Appearance(s) in Copa Paulista)	2	11	2
Athletico Paranaense (loan)	2018	Série A	3	0	—		0	0	—		—		3	0
Athletico Paranaense (loan)	2019	Série A	0	0	5	1	0	0	—		—		5	1
Athletico Paranaense (loan)	Subtotal		3	0	5	1	0	0	—		—		8	1
Mirassol (loan)	2019	Paulista	—		—		—		—		23	10	23	10
Ituano (loan)	2020	Série C	23	4	13	3	—		—		—		36	7
Ituano (loan)	2021	Série C	0	0	9	3	—		—		—		9	3
Ituano (loan)	Subtotal		23	4	22	6	—		—		—		45	10
Brusque (loan)	2021	Série B	9	1	—		—		—		—		9	1
Brusque (loan)	2022	Série B	16	1	—		—		—		—		16	1
Brusque (loan)	Subtotal		25	2	—		—		—		—		25	2
Santo André (loan)	2023	Série D	0	0	12	3	—		—		—		12	3
CSA (loan)	2023	Série C	14	5	—		3	2	—		—		17	7
Juventude	2023	Série B	11	6	—		—		—		—		11	6
Juventude	2024	Série A	21	2	0	0	2	0	—		—		23	2
Juventude	2025	Série A	34	8	6	1	1	0	—		—		41	9
Juventude	2026	Série B	0	0	9	3	2	3	—		—		11	6
Juventude	Subtotal		66	16	15	4	5	3	—		—		86	23
Remo	2026	Série A	3	2	—		0	0	—		1 (Note: Appearance(s) in Copa Norte)	1	4	3
Career total			134	29	113	40	5	3	0	0	35	13	287	85

== Honours ==
Athletico Paranaense

- Campeonato Paranaense: 2019

Individual

- Campeonato Paulista Série A3 top scorer: 2018
