= Michel (footballer, born 1989) =

Brazilian footballer

Personal information
- Full name: Michel das Chagas Henrique
- Date of birth: 19 May 1989 (age 37)
- Place of birth: São Gabriel, Brazil
- Height: 1.85 m (6 ft 1 in)
- Position: Forward

Team information
- Current team: Artigas

Youth career
- –2006: Coritiba

Senior career*
Years	Team	Apps	(Gls)
2006–2007	Coritiba		
2008	São Gabriel		
2009	Pelotas		
2010	Confiança		
2010	Luverdense		
2010	Camaçari		
2011	América-SP		
2011–2012	Juventude		
2012	→ Glória (loan)		
2012	Cerâmica		
2013	Guarani		
2014	URT		
2014	São Gabriel		
2014	Concórdia		
2015	Passo Fundo		
2015	Coritiba		
2016	Tupi		
2016	ABC		
2017	Ypiranga-RS		
2018	São Luiz		
2018–2019	Brasil de Pelotas		
2019	Caxias		
2020	São Luiz		
2020	Criciúma		
2020–2021	Concórdia		
2021	Caxias		
2022	XV de Piracicaba		
2022	Ferroviária	12	(5)
2022–2023	Manaus	7	(1)
2022	→ Passo Fundo (loan)		
2023	Inter de Santa Maria		
2024	Guarany de Bagé	12	(5)
2024	Inter de Santa Maria	16	(5)
2024	Passo Fundo	15	(3)
2025	Avenida	13	(2)
2025	FC Cascavel	13	(3)
2025–	Artigas	9	(0)
- * Club domestic league appearances and goals as of 13 October 2025

Michel das Chagas Henrique (born 19 May 1989), simply known as Michel, is a Brazilian professional footballer who plays as a forward.

== Career ==
Born in São Gabriel, Rio Grande do Sul, Michel began his football career in the youth sectors of Coritiba, being promoted to the main team in 2006. After his time at Coritiba, Michel also played for São Gabriel, Pelotas, Confiança, Luverdense, América-SP, Juventude, Glória, Cerâmica, Guarani, URT and Concórdia. In 2015, playing for EC Passo Fundo, he became top scorer in the state of Rio Grande do Sul with 11 goals, a feat that once again caught the attention of Coritiba, his first club.

He later played for Tupi de Juiz de Fora and ABC, until in 2018 he returned to Rio Grande do Sul at EC São Luiz, repeating the feat of 2015 and once again becoming top scorer in an edition of the Campeonato Gaúcho. After the end of the state championship, Brasil de Pelotas was announced Michel to compete in Série B that season. He returned to São Luiz in 2020 and again fought for the top scorer position in the state. In August 2020, he was announced as a reinforcement for Criciúma EC.

In 2021, he competed in the Campeonato Catarinense p for Concórdia, and was later hired by SER Caxias, where he scored 4 goals in the same match for the club, against Rio Branco de Paranaguá in 2021 Campeonato Brasileiro Série D.

In 2022 Michel played for XV de Piracicaba in the São Paulo Série A2, terminating his contract shortly afterwards to defend Ferroviária in the state first level. He reached the second semester at Manaus FC, being later loaned to Passo Fundo where he played in the Copa FGF. He remained at the Amazonas club until June 2023, renewing his contract to play for Inter de Santa Maria in the Campeonato Gaúcho Série A2.

In November 2023, he was announced by Guarany de Bagé to compete in the 2024 Campeonato Gaúcho. Also in 2024, he again defended the teams Inter de Santa Maria and Passo Fundo.

In the 2025 season, he played for Avenida in the state championship and FC Cascavel for the Série D. In August, he signed with CA Artigas, club from the Uruguayan Segunda División.

== Honours ==
Juventude

- Copa Dra. Lacy Ughini: 2011

Individual

- 2015 Campeonato Gaúcho top scorer: 11 goals
- 2018 Campeonato Gaúcho top scorer: 8 goals
