= Daniel Peixoto (footballer) =

Brazilian footballer (born 1997)

Personal information
- Full name: Daniel Nascimento Peixoto dos Santos
- Date of birth: 30 June 1997 (age 29)
- Place of birth: Salvador, Brazil
- Height: 1.81 m (5 ft 11 in)
- Position: Midfielder

Team information
- Current team: Atlético Goianiense (on loan from Noroeste)

Youth career
- Vitória
- Jacuipense

Senior career*
Years	Team	Apps	(Gls)
2018–2021	Jacuipense	43	(3)
2019–2020	→ Sport Recife (loan)	0	(0)
2020	→ Imperatriz (loan)	3	(0)
2022–	Rio Claro	31	(4)
2023	→ Figueirense (loan)	15	(0)
2024–2025	→ Juventude (loan)	15	(1)
2026–	Noroeste	13	(1)
2026–	→ Atlético Goianiense (loan)	16	(1)
- * Club domestic league appearances and goals as of 15 December 2025

Daniel Nascimento Peixoto dos Santos (born 30 June 1997), known as Daniel Peixoto or just Peixoto, is a Brazilian footballer who plays as a midfielder for Atlético Goianiense, on loan from Noroeste.

== Career ==
Born in Salvador, Bahia, Peixoto represented Vitória and Jacuipense as a youth before making his senior debut with the latter in 2018. In May 2019, he moved on loan to Sport Recife on loan and was initially assigned to the under-23 team.

On 23 July 2020, Peixoto moved to Imperatriz also on loan. After just three matches, he returned to Jacupa and started to feature more regularly.

On 21 December 2021, Peixoto was announced at Rio Claro. In May 2022, he agreed to join Série A side Goiás, but the move fell through after an injury was detected.

On 11 December 2022, Peixoto joined Figueirense on a one-year loan deal. After being sparingly used, he returned to Rio Claro for the 2024 season, where he was again a first-choice.

On 26 April 2024, Peixoto signed for top tier side Juventude on loan until the end of the year. He made his debut in the category on 15 June, coming on as a late substitute for Luís Oyama in a 2–1 away loss to Red Bull Bragantino.

== Career statistics ==
As of 17 September 2025.

Club	Season	League			State League		Cup		Continental		Other		Total	
Club	Season	Division	Apps	Goals	Apps	Goals	Apps	Goals	Apps	Goals	Apps	Goals	Apps	Goals
Jacuipense	2018	Série D	4	0	5	0	—		—		—		9	0
Jacuipense	2019	Série D	0	0	5	0	—		—		—		5	0
Jacuipense	2020	Série C	7	0	—		—		—		—		7	0
Jacuipense	2021	Série C	13	1	9	2	—		—		—		22	3
Jacuipense	Total		24	1	19	2	—		—		—		43	3
Imperatriz (loan)	2020	Série C	2	0	1	0	—		—		—		3	0
Rio Claro	2022	Paulista A2	—		17	0	—		—		3 (Note: Appearance(s) in Copa Paulista)	0	20	0
Rio Claro	2024	Paulista A2	—		14	4	—		—		—		14	4
Rio Claro	Total		—		31	4	—		—		3	0	34	4
Figueirense (loan)	2023	Série C	7	0	8	0	—		—		2 (Note: Appearance(s) in Copa Santa Catarina)	0	17	0
Juventude (loan)	2024	Série A	2	0	—		—		—		—		2	0
Juventude (loan)	2025	Série A	2	0	0	0	0	0	—		—		2	0
Juventude (loan)	Total		4	0	0	0	0	0	—		—		4	0
Career total			37	1	59	6	0	0	0	0	5	0	101	7
