= Ruan Carneiro =

Brazilian footballer (born 1990)

Personal information
- Full name: Eudes Ruan de Souza Carneiro
- Date of birth: 28 March 1990 (age 36)
- Place of birth: Balsas, Brazil
- Height: 1.95 m (6 ft 5 in)
- Position: Goalkeeper

Team information
- Current team: Juventude
- Number: 21

Senior career*
Years	Team	Apps	(Gls)
2010	Rio Branco-PR	0	(0)
2011	Araguaína	9	(0)
2011–2012	Vila Nova	10	(1)
2013	Boa Esporte	1	(0)
2013	Gurupi	2	(0)
2014	Moto Club	29	(0)
2014	→ Interporto (loan)	10	(0)
2015–2016	Sampaio Corrêa	20	(0)
2017	Moto Club	5	(0)
2018	Atlético Acreano	19	(0)
2019	Portuguesa-RJ	9	(0)
2019	Atlético Acreano	17	(0)
2020–2023	Brusque	56	(0)
2024	Avenida	11	(0)
2024–2025	Figueirense	20	(0)
2025–	Juventude	4	(0)
- * Club domestic league appearances and goals as of 15 December 2025

Eudes Ruan de Souza Carneiro (born 28 March 1990), known as Ruan Carneiro or just Ruan, is a Brazilian footballer who plays as a goalkeeper for Juventude.

== Career ==
Born in Balsas, Maranhão, Ruan made his senior debut with Rio Branco-PR in 2010. He moved to Araguaína in the following year, before signing for Vila Nova in September of that year.

Released by Vila in January 2013, Ruan subsequently moved to Boa Esporte, but ended the season at Gurupi. He joined Moto Club for the 2014 season, and renewed his contract until the end of the year in April, being immediately loaned to Interporto.

Ruan returned to Moto in July 2014 after winning the year's Campeonato Tocantinense with Interporto, but was announced at Sampaio Corrêa on 2 January 2015. Despite being mainly a backup option, he renewed his contract for a further year on 4 December.

On 5 December 2016, Ruan returned to Moto for the upcoming campaign. He suffered a knee injury the following July, and moved to Atlético Acreano in April 2018.

Ruan left for Portuguesa-RJ ahead of the 2019 season, but returned to Atlético on 22 April of that year. On 12 December 2019, he was announced at Brusque.

Despite being mainly a backup option, Ruan opted to leave the club in July 2022, after receiving an offer from a Saudi club, but the deal later collapsed, and he renewed his contract in November. On 18 November 2023, he left the Quadricolor after four seasons, and was announced at Avenida six days later.

On 2 April 2024, Ruan agreed to a deal with Figueirense. On 28 March of the following year, he left the club to join Série A side Juventude on a contract until the end of the season.

Ruan made his debut in the top tier of Brazilian football at the age of 35 on 4 August 2025, starting in a 3–1 away loss to Santos.

== Career statistics ==
As of 5 August 2025.

Club	Season	League			State League		Cup		Continental		Other		Total	
Club	Season	Division	Apps	Goals	Apps	Goals	Apps	Goals	Apps	Goals	Apps	Goals	Apps	Goals
Rio Branco-PR	2010	Paranaense	—		0	0	—		—		—		0	0
Araguaína	2011	Série C	6	0	3	0	—		—		—		9	0
Vila Nova	2011	Série B	0	0	—		—		—		—		0	0
Vila Nova	2012	Série C	9	0	1	0	—		—		—		10	0
Vila Nova	Total		9	0	1	0	—		—		—		10	0
Boa Esporte	2013	Série B	0	0	1	0	—		—		—		1	0
Gurupi	2013	Série D	2	0	—		—		—		—		2	0
Moto Club	2014	Série D	12	0	17	0	—		—		—		29	0
Interporto (loan)	2014	Série D	—		10	0	—		—		—		10	0
Sampaio Corrêa	2015	Série B	10	0	3	0	1	0	—		2 (Note: Appearance(s) in Copa do Nordeste)	0	16	0
Sampaio Corrêa	2016	Série B	2	0	5	0	0	0	—		3	0	10	0
Sampaio Corrêa	Total		12	0	8	0	1	0	—		5	0	26	0
Moto Club	2017	Série C	0	0	5	0	1	0	—		5	0	11	0
Atlético Acreano	2018	Série C	19	0	—		—		—		—		19	0
Portuguesa-RJ	2019	Série D	—		9	0	—		—		—		9	0
Atlético Acreano	2019	Série D	17	0	—		—		—		4 (Note: Appearance(s) in Copa Verde)	0	21	0
Brusque	2020	Série C	13	0	1	0	0	0	—		0	0	14	0
Brusque	2021	Série B	19	0	5	0	1	0	—		—		25	0
Brusque	2022	Série B	7	0	6	0	—		—		—		13	0
Brusque	2023	Série C	5	0	0	0	0	0	—		0	0	5	0
Brusque	Total		44	0	12	0	1	0	—		0	0	57	0
Avenida	2024	Série D	—		11	0	—		—		—		11	0
Figueirense	2024	Série C	18	0	—		—		—		7 (Note: Appearance(s) in Copa Santa Catarina)	0	25	0
Figueirense	2025	Série C	—		2	0	—		—		—		2	0
Figueirense	Total		18	0	2	0	—		—		7	0	27	0
Juventude	2025	Série A	1	0	—		—		—		—		1	0
Career total			140	0	79	0	3	0	0	0	21	0	243	0

== Honours ==
Interporto

- Campeonato Tocantinense: 2014

Brusque

- Recopa Catarinense: 2020, 2023
- Campeonato Catarinense: 2022
