= Davi Góes =

Brazilian footballer

Personal information
- Full name: Davi Góes Silva Ferreira Carvalho
- Date of birth: 22 June 2005 (age 21)
- Place of birth: Ipatinga, Brazil
- Height: 1.85 m (6 ft 1 in)
- Position: Midfielder

Team information
- Current team: Juventude
- Number: 88

Youth career
- Brasilis
- 2023–: Juventude
- 2025–2026: → Palmeiras (loan)

Senior career*
Years	Team	Apps	(Gls)
2024–	Juventude	7	(0)
- * Club domestic league appearances and goals as of 16 April 2026

Davi Góes Silva Ferreira Carvalho (born 22 June 2005), known as Davi Góes or just Davi, is a Brazilian footballer who plays as a midfielder for Juventude.

== Club career ==
Born in Ipatinga, Minas Gerais, Davi joined Juventude's youth setup in November 2022, from Brasilis. In June 2024, he was close to a loan move to Swiss club FC Lugano, but the move fell through.

After featuring with a B-team in the 2023 Copa FGF, Davi made his first team – and Série A – debut on 11 August 2024, starting in a 3–2 home win over Botafogo. On 13 June of the following year, he was loaned to Palmeiras for the under-20 squad, until January.

== Career statistics ==
As of 1 July 2025

Club	Season	League			State League		Cup		Continental		Other		Total	
Club	Season	Division	Apps	Goals	Apps	Goals	Apps	Goals	Apps	Goals	Apps	Goals	Apps	Goals
Juventude	2023	Série B	0	0	0	0	0	0	—		3 (Note: Appearance(s) in Copa FGF)	0	3	0
Juventude	2024	Série A	1	0	0	0	0	0	—		—		1	0
Juventude	2025	Série A	2	0	2	0	0	0	—		—		4	0
Career total			3	0	2	0	0	0	0	0	3	0	8	0
