= 2024 Esporte Clube Juventude season =

Juventude
2024 season
- Manager: Roger Machado (until 18 July); Jair Ventura (19 July–28 October); Fábio Matias (from 28 October)
- Stadium: Estádio Alfredo Jaconi
- Série A: 15th
- Campeonato Gaúcho: Runners-up
- Copa do Brasil: Quarter-finals
Home colours	Away colours	Third colours

The 2024 season was the 111th season in the existence of Esporte Clube Juventude and the club's first season in the top flight of Brazilian football. In addition to the domestic league, Juventude participated in this season's edition of the Copa do Brasil.

== Competitions ==
=== Overall record ===
Competition	First match	Last match	Starting round	Final position	Record							
Competition	First match	Last match	Starting round	Final position	Pld	W	D	L	GF	GA	GD	Win %
Série A	14 April 2024	8 December 2024	Matchday 1	15th	38	11	12	15	48	59	−11	28.95
Campeonato Gaúcho	20 January 2024	6 April 2024		Runners-up	16	5	6	5	21	13	+8	31.25
Copa do Brasil	27 February 2024	12 September 2024	Third round	Quarter-finals	6	3	2	1	10	8	+2	50.00
Total					60	19	20	21	79	80	−1	31.67

Source: Competitions

=== Série A ===
==== League table ====
Pos	Team	Pld	W	D	L	GF	GA	GD	Pts	Qualification or relegation
13	Fluminense	38	12	10	16	33	39	−6	46	Qualification for Copa Sudamericana group stage
14	Grêmio	38	12	9	17	44	50	−6	45	Qualification for Copa Sudamericana group stage
15	Juventude	38	11	12	15	48	59	−11	45	
16	Red Bull Bragantino	38	10	14	14	44	48	−4	44	
17	Athletico Paranaense (R)	38	11	9	18	40	46	−6	42	Relegation to Campeonato Brasileiro Série B

Source: CBF
Rules for classification: 1) points; 2) wins; 3) goal difference; 4) goals scored; 5) head-to-head results (only between two teams); 6) fewest red cards; 7) fewest yellow cards; 8) drawing of lots.
(R) Relegated

==== Results summary ====
Overall								Home						Away					
Pld	W	D	L	GF	GA	GD	Pts	W	D	L	GF	GA	GD	W	D	L	GF	GA	GD
18	5	6	7	20	24	−4	21	5	4	1	14	6	+8	0	2	6	6	18	−12

==== Results by round ====
Round	1	2	3	4	5	6	7	8	9	10	11	12	13	14	15	16	17	18	19	20	21	22	23	24	25	26	27	28	29	30	31	32	33	34	35	36	37	38
Ground	A	H	A	H	H	A	A	H	A	H	A	H	A	A	H	A	H	H	A	H	A	H	A	A	H	H	A	H	A	H	A	H	H	A	H	A	A	H
Result	D	W	L	D	W	L	D	D	L	W	L	W	L	L	W	D	D	D	L	L	D	W	W	L	L	W	L	D	D	L	L	L	W	D	D	W	W	L
Position	10	3	12	13	11	12	13	12	13	13	13	13	13	13	13	14	14	13	14	14	15	14	13	13	15	13	13	13	15	16	18	18	17	16	16	15	13	15

A = Away; H = Home; W = Win; D = Draw; L = Loss

==== Matches ====
The match schedule was released on 29 February 2024.

13 April 2024 1	Criciúma	1–1	Juventude

17 April 2024 2	Juventude	2–0	Corinthians

21 April 2024 3	Botafogo	5–1	Juventude

28 April 2024 4	Juventude	1–1	Athletico Paranaense

1 June 2024 7	Fluminense	1–1	Juventude

5 June 2024 5	Juventude	1–0	Atlético Goianiense

11 June 2024 8	Juventude	1–1	Vitória

15 June 2024 9	Red Bull Bragantino	2–1	Juventude

19 June 2024 10	Juventude	2–0	Vasco da Gama

23 June 2024 11	Palmeiras	3–1	Juventude

26 June 2024 12	Juventude	2–1	Flamengo

30 June 2024 13	Fortaleza	2–1	Juventude

4 July 2024 14	Bahia	2–0	Juventude

7 July 2024 15	Juventude	3–0	Grêmio

16 July 2024 17	Juventude	1–1	Atlético Mineiro

21 July 2024 18	Juventude	0–0	São Paulo

24 July 2024 19	Cruzeiro	2–0	Juventude

27 July 2024 20	Juventude	1–2	Criciúma

4 August 2024 21	Corinthians	1–1	Juventude

11 August 2024 22	Juventude	3–2	Botafogo

14 August 2024 6	Internacional	2–1	Juventude

18 August 2024 23	Athletico Paranaense	1–2	Juventude

24 August 2024 24	Atlético Goianiense	2–1	Juventude

1 September 2024 25	Juventude	1–3	Internacional

5 September 2024 16	Cuiabá	0–0	Juventude

15 September 2024 26	Juventude	2–1	Fluminense

21 September 2024 27	Vitória	1–0	Juventude

29 September 2024 28	Juventude	1–1	Red Bull Bragantino

5 October 2024 29	Vasco da Gama	1–1	Juventude

20 October 2024 30	Juventude	3–5	Palmeiras

26 October 2024 31	Flamengo	4–2	Juventude

2 November 2024 32	Juventude	0–3	Fortaleza

9 November 2024 33	Juventude	2–1	Bahia

20 November 2024 34	Grêmio	2–2	Juventude

23 November 2024 35	Juventude	1–1	Cuiabá

26 November 2024 36	Atlético Mineiro	2–3	Juventude

4 December 2024 37	São Paulo	1–2	Juventude

8 December 2024 38	Juventude	0–1	Cruzeiro

=== Campeonato Gaúcho ===
20 January 2024 1	Santa Cruz	0–1	Juventude
19:00 UTC−3

24 January 2024 2	Juventude	4–0	Guarany	Caxias do Sul
19:00				Stadium: Estádio Alfredo Jaconi

27 January 2024 3	São José	1–0	Juventude
19:00 UTC−3

=== Copa do Brasil ===
==== Third round ====
10 July 2024 First leg	Internacional	1–2	Juventude	Porto Alegre
19:00 UTC−3				Stadium: Estádio Beira-Rio

13 July 2024 Second leg	Juventude	1–1 (3–2 agg.)	Internacional	Caxias do Sul
17:15 UTC−3	Jadson Alves dos Santos (yellow card) 39'; Rodrigo Sam 45+6'; Erick Farias (yellow card) 45+9'; Jean Carlos (yellow card) 72'; Alan Ruschel (red card) 75'		Alan Patrick (penalty missed) 53'; Bruno Henrique (yellow card) 58'; Enner Valencia 79' (pen.); Vitão (red card) 90+5'	Stadium: Estádio Alfredo Jaconi; Referee: Rodrigo José Pereira de Lima

==== Round of 16 ====
1 August 2024 First leg	Juventude	3–2	Fluminense	Caxias do Sul
19:00	Caíque (yellow card) 32'; Ewerthon (yellow card) 39'; Jean Carlos (yellow card) 40'; Lucas Barbosa 48'; Rodrigo Sam 55'; Diego Gonçalves 74'		Lima 3'; Fábio (yellow card) 24'; Thiago dos Santos 90+4'	Stadium: Estádio Alfredo Jaconi; Referee: Luiz Flávio

7 August 2024 Second leg	Fluminense	v (2–3 agg.)	Juventude	Rio de Janeiro
21:30				Stadium: Maracanã Stadium
