= Abner (footballer, born 2004) =

Brazilian footballer (born 2004)

Personal information
- Full name: Abner Salles da Silva
- Date of birth: 19 April 2004 (age 22)
- Place of birth: Rio de Janeiro, Brazil
- Height: 1.89 m (6 ft 2 in)
- Position: Centre-back

Team information
- Current team: Riga (on loan from Juventude)
- Number: 3

Youth career
- Bangu
- 2020–2022: América Mineiro
- 2022–2024: Juventude

Senior career*
Years	Team	Apps	(Gls)
2024–	Juventude	33	(2)
2026–	→ Riga (loan)	7	(1)
- * Club domestic league appearances and goals as of 12 November 2026

Abner Salles da Silva (born 19 April 2004), simply known as Abner, is a Brazilian footballer who plays as a centre-back for Latvian Higher League club Riga on loan from Juventude.

== Club career ==
Born in Rio de Janeiro, Abner joined Juventude's youth setup in 2022, after representing América Mineiro and Bangu. On 11 January 2023, he signed his first professional contract with the former.

After featuring with a B-team in the 2023 Copa FGF, Abner made his first team – and Série A – debut on 21 April 2024, coming on as a late substitute for Luis Mandaca in a 5–1 away loss to Botafogo.

On 12 March 2026, Abner joined Latvian club Riga FC on a loan-deal for the 2026-season.

== Career statistics ==
As of 20 August 2024

Club	Season	League			State League		Cup		Continental		Other		Total	
Club	Season	Division	Apps	Goals	Apps	Goals	Apps	Goals	Apps	Goals	Apps	Goals	Apps	Goals
Juventude	2023	Série B	0	0	0	0	0	0	—		8 (Note: Appearance(s) in Copa FGF)	0	8	0
Juventude	2024	Série A	3	0	0	0	2	0	—		—		5	0
Career total			3	0	0	0	2	0	0	0	8	0	13	0
