= Marcos Paulo (footballer, born 2003) =

Brazilian footballer

Personal information
- Full name: Marcos Paulo Lima Batista Silva
- Date of birth: 18 January 2003 (age 23)
- Place of birth: Rio de Janeiro, Brazil
- Height: 1.83 m (6 ft 0 in)
- Position: Left back

Team information
- Current team: Juventude
- Number: 47

Youth career
- 2019–2023: Nova Iguaçu
- 2020–2023: → Flamengo (loan)

Senior career*
Years	Team	Apps	(Gls)
2022–2025	Nova Iguaçu	0	(0)
2022–2023	→ Flamengo (loan)	4	(0)
2024	→ Red Bull Bragantino II (loan)	15	(1)
2025	→ Juventude (loan)	24	(0)
2026–	Juventude	39	(2)
- * Club domestic league appearances and goals as of 16 November 2026

Marcos Paulo Lima Batista Silva (born 18 January 2003), known as Marcos Paulo, it is a Brazilian footballer who plays as a left back. He currently plays for Juventude.

== Career ==
Marcos Paulo made his debut on the 26 January 2022, starting for Flamengo in the Campeonato Carioca 2–1 home win against Portuguesa da Ilha.

== Career statistics ==
As of 5 February 2025

Appearances and goals by club, season and competition
Club	Season	League			State League		Cup		Continental		Other		Total	
Club	Season	Division	Apps	Goals	Apps	Goals	Apps	Goals	Apps	Goals	Apps	Goals	Apps	Goals
Flamengo	2022	Série A	1	0	2 (Note: Appearance(s) in the Campeonato Carioca.)	0	2	0	0	0	—		5	0
Flamengo	2023	Série A	0	0	1	0	—		—		—		1	0
Flamengo	Total		1	0	3	0	2	0	0	0	0	0	6	0
Red Bull Bragantino II	2024	Paulista A3	—		15 (Note: Appearance(s) in the Campeonato Paulista Série A3.)	1	—		—		—		15	1
Juventude	2025	Série A	0	0	1 (Note: Appearance(s) in the Campeonato Gaúcho.)	0	0	0	—		—		1	0
Career total			1	0	19	1	2	0	0	0	0	0	22	1

== Honours ==
Flamengo

- Copa Libertadores: 2022
