= Cipriano (footballer) =

Brazilian footballer

Personal information
- Full name: João Luiz da Silva Cipriano
- Date of birth: 9 November 2002 (age 24)
- Place of birth: Brusque, Brazil
- Height: 1.97 m (6 ft 6 in)
- Position: Centre-back

Team information
- Current team: Brusque (on loan from APOEL)
- Number: 4

Youth career
- 2015–2020: Criciúma
- 2019–2020: → Fluminense (loan)
- 2021–2022: Fluminense

Senior career*
Years	Team	Apps	(Gls)
2023–2024	Fluminense	0	(0)
2023	→ Red Bull Bragantino II (loan)	4	(0)
2023	→ Red Bull Bragantino (loan)	1	(0)
2024	→ APOEL (loan)	2	(0)
2024–	APOEL	1	(0)
2025–2026	→ Juventude (loan)	7	(0)
2026–	→ Brusque (loan)	20	(3)
- * Club domestic league appearances and goals as of 9 November 2026

João Luiz da Silva Cipriano (born 9 November 2002), known as Cipriano, is a Brazilian professional footballer who plays as a centre-back for Brusque, on loan from APOEL.

== Career ==
Born in Brusque, Santa Catarina, Cipriano joined Fluminense's youth setup in 2019, from Criciúma. Initially on loan, he agreed to a permanent contract with the club on 29 December 2020, signing until 2024.

On 3 February 2023, Cipriano was loaned to Red Bull Bragantino for the year, and was initially assigned to the reserve team. He made his first team – and Série A – debut on 6 August, starting in a 1–0 away win over Coritiba.

== Personal life ==
Cipriano comes from a family of footballers: his father Agenor played professionally in the 1980s and 1990s, being later a head coach of Carlos Renaux, and his older brother Eduardo played in the youth sides of Criciúma.

== Career statistics ==
As of 8 July 2024

Club	Season	League			State League		Cup		Continental		Other		Total	
Club	Season	Division	Apps	Goals	Apps	Goals	Apps	Goals	Apps	Goals	Apps	Goals	Apps	Goals
Red Bull Bragantino II	2023	Paulista A3	—		4	0	—		—		1 (Note: Appearance(s) in Copa Paulista)	0	5	0
Red Bull Bragantino	2023	Série A	1	0	—		0	0	0	0	—		1	0
APOEL (loan)	2023–24	Cypriot First Division	2	0	0	0	—		—		—		2	0
Career total			3	0	4	0	0	0	0	0	1	0	8	0
