= Kelvi =

Brazilian footballer

Personal information
- Full name: Kelvi Chiesa Gomes
- Date of birth: 17 October 2002 (age 24)
- Place of birth: Ilópolis, Brazil
- Height: 1.82 m (6 ft 0 in)
- Position: Midfielder

Team information
- Current team: Guarani
- Number: 7

Youth career
- 2017–2022: Juventude

Senior career*
Years	Team	Apps	(Gls)
2022–2025	Juventude	15	(0)
2023	→ Paysandu (loan)	5	(0)
2024	→ Concórdia (loan)	14	(0)
2025–	Guarani	4	(0)
- * Club domestic league appearances and goals as of 16:29, 16 July 2025 (UTC)

Kelvi Chiesa Gomes (born 17 October 2002), known simply as Kelvi, is a Brazilian footballer who plays as a midfielder for Guarani.

== Career ==
Born in Ilópolis in the state of Rio Grande do Sul, Kelvi joined Juventude in nearby Caxias do Sul when he was 14, having passed a trial in Ibiaçá. He won the state championship at under-15 level and played in the national youth league. In February 2021, the 18-year-old signed a contract to last until the end of 2023.

On 13 February 2022, Kelvi made his professional debut in the Campeonato Gaúcho, playing the full 90 minutes of a 1–1 draw away to Grêmio. Exactly nine months later he played his first Campeonato Brasileiro Série A game in his only appearance of the season, coming on as a 49th-minute substitute for Pará in a 4–1 loss on the final day away to fellow relegated team Ceará.

On 30 March 2023, Kelvi – who had played only twice in the year's state championship – was loaned to Paysandu in the Campeonato Brasileiro Série C in order to make more space for his parent club in Série B. He returned by mutual consent on 7 June, having played five times in the Campeonato Paraense and once in the Copa do Brasil.

Kelvi scored the winning goal in the penalty shootout on 26 March 2024 as Juventude defeated Internacional to reach the final of the Campeonato Gaúcho for the first time in eight years. He spent the rest of the year on loan at Concórdia in the Campeonato Brasileiro Série D, making 14 appearances and then renewing his Juventude contract for 2025.

In June 2025, Kelvi transferred to Guarani for the remainder of the calendar year, in Série C.
