= Marcão (footballer, born 2001) =

Brazilian footballer

Personal information
- Full name: Marcos Vinicius Carvalho dos Reis
- Date of birth: 15 May 2001 (age 25)
- Place of birth: Betim, Brazil
- Height: 1.92 m (6 ft 4 in)
- Position: Centre-back

Team information
- Current team: Paços de Ferreira (on loan from Atlético Goianiense)
- Number: 5

Youth career
- América Mineiro
- 2020: Resende
- 2021: Betim

Senior career*
| Years | Team | Apps | (Gls) |
| 2022–2023 | Al-Taawon | 11 | (2) |
| 2023–2024 | Centro Oeste | 5 | (0) |
| 2024 | → Goiânia (loan) | 14 | (0) |
| 2024 | → Atlético Goianiense (loan) | 1 | (0) |
| 2025– | Atlético Goianiense | 3 | (0) |
| 2025 | → CSA (loan) | 9 | (0) |
| 2026 | → Anápolis (loan) | 2 | (0) |
| 2026– | → Paços de Ferreira (loan) | 0 | (0) |
- * Club domestic league appearances and goals as of 13 September 2026

Marcos Vinicius Carvalho dos Reis (born 15 May 2001), commonly known as Marcão, is a Brazilian footballer who plays as a centre-back for Portuguese Liga 3 club Paços de Ferreira on loan from Atlético Goianiense.

== Career ==
Born in Betim, Minas Gerais, Marcão began his career with América Mineiro, and subsequently represented the youth sides of Resende and Betim Futebol before moving to Emirati side Al-Taawon in January 2022.

In July 2023, Marcão returned to his home country and joined Centro Oeste. He was included in Goiânia's squad for the 2024 season in December, and was an undisputed starter for the club in the Campeonato Goiano.

On 10 April 2024, Marcão signed for Série A side Atlético Goianiense. He made his debut in the category on 11 July, starting in a 3–1 away loss to Palmeiras.

== Career statistics ==
As of 12 July 2024

| Club | Season | League | | | State League | | Cup | | Continental | | Other | | Total | |
| Club | Season | Division | Apps | Goals | Apps | Goals | Apps | Goals | Apps | Goals | Apps | Goals | Apps | Goals |
|---|---|---|---|---|---|---|---|---|---|---|---|---|---|---|
| Al-Taawon | 2021–22 | UAE Division 1 | 10 | 2 | — | | 2 | 0 | — | | — | | 12 | 2 |
| Al-Taawon | 2022–23 | UAE Division 1 | 1 | 0 | — | | 0 | 0 | — | | — | | 1 | 0 |
| Al-Taawon | Total | | 11 | 2 | — | | 2 | 0 | — | | — | | 13 | 2 |
| Centro Oeste | 2023 | Goiano 2ª Divisão | — | | 5 | 0 | — | | — | | — | | 5 | 0 |
| Goiânia (loan) | 2024 | Goiano | — | | 14 | 0 | — | | — | | — | | 14 | 0 |
| Atlético Goianiense (loan) | 2024 | Série A | 1 | 0 | — | | 0 | 0 | — | | — | | 1 | 0 |
| Career total | | | 12 | 2 | 19 | 0 | 2 | 0 | 0 | 0 | 0 | 0 | 33 | 2 |
