= Roger Machado (footballer) =

Brazilian footballer

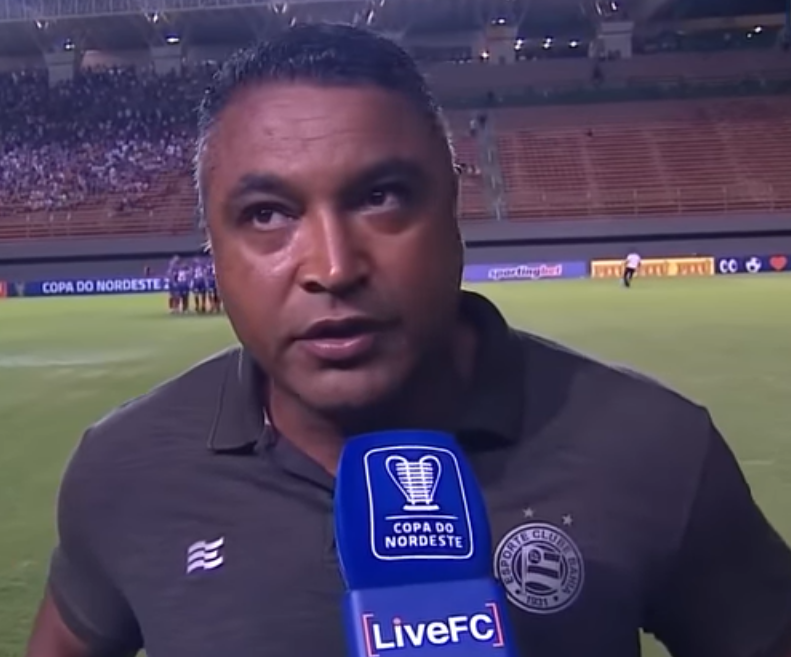
- Roger in 2020

Personal information
- Full name: Roger Machado Marques
- Date of birth: 4 March 1975 (age 51)
- Place of birth: Porto Alegre, Brazil
- Height: 1.76 m (5 ft 9 in)
- Position: Left-back

Youth career
- 1991–1993: Grêmio

Senior career*
Years	Team	Apps	(Gls)
1994–2003	Grêmio	270	(5)
2004–2005	Vissel Kobe	46	(4)
2006–2008	Fluminense	91	(8)
Total		407	(17)

International career
2001	Brazil	1	(0)

Managerial career
- 2011–2014: Grêmio (assistant)
- 2012: Grêmio (interim)
- 2014: Juventude
- 2015: Novo Hamburgo
- 2015–2016: Grêmio
- 2017: Atlético Mineiro
- 2018: Palmeiras
- 2019–2020: Bahia
- 2021: Fluminense
- 2022: Grêmio
- 2024: Juventude
- 2024–2025: Internacional
- 2026: São Paulo
- * Club domestic league appearances and goals

Roger Machado Marques (born 4 March 1975) is a Brazilian football coach and former player who played as a left-back.

Machado's playing career was mainly associated with Grêmio, a club he represented for ten years. After retiring with Fluminense in 2008, he later became a coach, being notably in charge of both his former sides.

== Playing career ==
A Grêmio youth graduate, Porto Alegre-born Machado made his debut for the club in 1994. A regular starter, he was among of the club's most successful era, achieving one Série A and one Copa Libertadores.

In 2004 Machado moved abroad, signing for J1 League side Vissel Kobe. Returning to Brazil in 2006, he joined Fluminense and also featured regularly. In 2009, he agreed to a move to D.C. United, but the deal was cancelled after a back injury, and he subsequently retired.

Machado's maiden appearance for the Brazil football team occurred on 12 June 2001, in a 1–0 loss against Mexico for the year's Copa América.

== Coaching career ==
=== Early career ===
Machado returned to his first club Grêmio on 5 January 2011, as an assistant coach. He left the club in December 2013, and was subsequently appointed head coach of Juventude the following 19 February.

Sacked on 28 July 2014, Roger was named Novo Hamburgo head coach on 19 December.

=== Grêmio ===
On 26 May 2015, Machado replaced Luiz Felipe Scolari at the helm of former side Grêmio. He led the club to an impressive third position during the campaign, being praised for his tactical duties.

On 15 September 2016, after a poor run of form, Machado resigned.

=== Atlético Mineiro ===
On 2 December 2016, Machado was announced at Atlético Mineiro, signing a two-year deal. He was relieved from his duties on 20 July of the following year, after a 2–0 home loss against Bahia.

=== Palmeiras ===
On 22 November 2017, Machado was appointed head coach of Palmeiras for the 2018 season. He was dismissed the following 26 July, being subsequently replaced by Scolari; his team went on to win the first division after his dismissal.

=== Bahia ===
On 2 April 2019, Machado replaced sacked Enderson Moreira at the helm of Bahia. On 2 September of the following year, after a 5–3 home loss against Flamengo, he was himself dismissed.

=== Fluminense ===
On 27 February 2021, Machado was named head coach of another club he represented as a player, Fluminense. He was sacked on 21 August, after being knocked out of the 2021 Copa Libertadores.

=== Grêmio return ===
On 14 February 2022, Machado replaced Vagner Mancini at the helm of Grêmio, but was himself dismissed on 1 September.

=== Juventude ===
On 12 January 2024, Machado returned to Juventude after nearly ten years, in the place of Thiago Carpini. On 17 July, amidst rumours of a possible move to Internacional, he resigned from Ju.

=== Internacional ===
Machado's move to Inter was confirmed on 18 July 2024, as he agreed to a contract until December 2025. After a defeat to Grêmio on 21 September 2025, the club announced his sacking.

=== São Paulo ===
On 10 March 2026, Machado took over São Paulo also in the top tier, replacing Hernán Crespo. On 13 May, after being knocked out of the 2026 Copa do Brasil by former side Juventude, he was dismissed.

== Career statistics ==
=== Club ===
Appearances and goals by club, season and competition
Club	Season	League			State League		Cup		Continental		Other		Total	
Club	Season	Division	Apps	Goals	Apps	Goals	Apps	Goals	Apps	Goals	Apps	Goals	Apps	Goals
Grêmio	1994	Série A	21	0	16	0	8	0	1 (Note: Appearance(s) in Copa CONMEBOL)	0	4 (Note: Appearance(s) in Supercopa Libertadores)	0	50	0
Grêmio	1995	Série A	16	1	13	0	8	0	14 (Note: Appearance(s) in Copa Libertadores)	0	8 (Note: Three appearances in Copa dos Campeões Mundiais, four appearances in Supercopa Libertadores, one appearance in Intercontinental Cup)	0	59	1
Grêmio	1996	Série A	24	0	10	0	6	0	6	0	6 (Note: One appearance in Recopa Sudamericana, three appearances in Copa dos Campeões Mundiais, two appearances in Supercopa Libertadores)	0	52	0
Grêmio	1997	Série A	5	0	9	0	5	0	8	0	2	0	29	0
Grêmio	1998	Série A	24	2	5	0	4	0	8 (Note: Two appearances and one goal in Copa Libertadores, six appearances in Copa Mercosur)	1	—		41	3
Grêmio	1999	Série A	15	0	11	1	5	0	5 (Note: Appearance(s) in Copa Mercosur)	0	16 (Note: Twelve appearances in Copa Sul-Minas, four appearances in Seletiva para a Libertadores)	0	52	1
Grêmio	2000	Série A	3	0	14	0	3	0	—		6 (Note: Appearance(s) in Copa Sul-Minas)	0	26	0
Grêmio	2001	Série A	18	0	4	0	7	0	6	0	—		14	0
Grêmio	2002	Série A	23	0	2	0	—		12	0	13	0	50	0
Grêmio	2003	Série A	32	1	5	0	—		10 (Note: Nine appearances and one goal in Copa Libertadores, one appearance in Copa Sudamericana)	1	—		46	2
Grêmio	Total		181	4	89	1	46	0	70	2	55	0	441	7
Vissel Kobe	2004	J.League Division 1	28	3	—		1	0	—		6 (Note: Appearance(s) in J.League Cup)	1	35	4
Vissel Kobe	2005	J.League Division 1	18	1	—		0	0	—		5	0	23	1
Vissel Kobe	Total		46	4	—		1	0	—		11	1	58	5
Fluminense	2006	Série A	28	3	6	2	7	0	4 (Note: Appearance(s) in Copa Sudamericana)	0	—		45	5
Fluminense	2007	Série A	26	0	4	0	5	1	—		—		35	1
Fluminense	2008	Série A	18	0	9	3	—		12	1	—		39	4
Fluminense	Total		72	3	19	5	12	1	16	1	—		119	10
Career total			299	11	108	6	59	1	86	3	66	1	568	14

=== International ===
Appearances and goals by national team and year
National team	Year	Apps	Goals
Brazil	2001	1	0
Total		1	0

== Coaching statistics ==
As of 13 May 2026.

Coaching record by team and tenure
Team	Nat	From	To	Record								Ref
Team	Nat	From	To	G	W	D	L	GF	GA	GD	Win %	Ref
Grêmio (interim)	(Brazil)	29 January 2011	30 January 2011	1	1	0	0	2	1	+1	100.00	
Grêmio (interim)	(Brazil)	21 February 2012	22 February 2012	1	1	0	0	2	1	+1	100.00	
Grêmio (interim)	(Brazil)	30 January 2013	14 February 2013	4	1	0	3	7	8	−1	25.00	
Grêmio (interim)	(Brazil)	1 May 2013	16 May 2013	2	1	0	1	2	2	+0	50.00	
Juventude	(Brazil)	19 February 2014	28 July 2014	16	6	5	5	15	18	−3	37.50	
Novo Hamburgo	(Brazil)	19 December 2014	26 May 2015	16	6	4	6	14	15	−1	37.50	
Grêmio	(Brazil)	26 May 2015	15 September 2016	93	48	22	23	136	90	+46	51.61	
Atlético Mineiro	(Brazil)	2 December 2016	20 July 2017	43	23	9	11	74	41	+33	53.49	
Palmeiras	(Brazil)	22 November 2017	26 July 2018	40	24	8	8	69	31	+38	60.00	
Bahia	(Brazil)	2 April 2019	2 September 2020	73	29	22	22	92	74	+18	39.73	
Fluminense	(Brazil)	27 February 2021	21 August 2021	42	19	12	11	60	43	+17	45.24	
Grêmio	(Brazil)	14 February 2022	1 September 2022	37	17	12	8	50	23	+27	45.95	
Juventude	(Brazil)	12 January 2024	17 July 2024	34	12	12	10	45	35	+10	35.29	
Internacional	(Brazil)	18 July 2024	21 September 2025	73	34	20	19	112	82	+30	46.58	
São Paulo	(Brazil)	10 March 2026	13 May 2026	17	7	4	6	20	17	+3	41.18	
Total				492	229	130	133	700	481	+219	46.54	—

== Honours ==
=== Player ===
Grêmio

- Copa Libertadores: 1995
- Recopa Sudamericana: 1996
- Campeonato Brasileiro Série A: 1996
- Copa do Brasil: 1994, 1997, 2001
- Campeonato Gaúcho: 1995, 1996, 1999, 2001

Fluminense

- Copa do Brasil: 2007

=== Coach ===
Atlético Mineiro

- Campeonato Mineiro: 2017

Bahia

- Campeonato Baiano: 2019, 2020

Grêmio

- Campeonato Gaúcho: 2022
- Recopa Gaúcha: 2022

Internacional

- Campeonato Gaúcho: 2025

=== Individual ===
- Campeonato Paulista Best head coach: 2018
