= Luis Mandaca =

Brazilian footballer (born 2001)

Personal information
- Full name: Luis Gustavo da Silva Machado Duarte
- Date of birth: 2 October 2001 (age 25)
- Place of birth: João Pessoa, Brazil
- Height: 1.78 m (5 ft 10 in)
- Position: Midfielder

Team information
- Current team: Juventude
- Number: 44

Youth career
- CSP
- 2020–2021: → Corinthians (loan)
- 2021–2022: Corinthians

Senior career*
Years	Team	Apps	(Gls)
2019–2020	CSP	17	(2)
2019	→ São Paulo Crystal (loan)	3	(0)
2021–2023	Corinthians	2	(1)
2022	→ Londrina (loan)	31	(1)
2023	→ Juventude (loan)	33	(3)
2024–	Juventude	110	(12)
- * Club domestic league appearances and goals as of 16 November 2026

Luis Gustavo da Silva Machado Duarte (born 2 October 2001), known as Luis Mandaca or just Mandaca, is a Brazilian footballer who plays as a midfielder for Juventude.

== Personal life ==
Born in João Pessoa, Paraíba, Mandaca earned his nickname due to his home neighbourhood, Mandacaru. During the beginning of his career, he was taken to training by his mother on a bicycle.

== Career ==
Mandaca began his career with CSP, making his first team debut with the club in the 2019 Campeonato Paraibano. After a short loan period at São Paulo Crystal, he moved to the under-20 side of Corinthians on 11 September 2020, initially on loan.

On 25 March 2021, Mandaca signed a permanent contract with Timão, after the club bought 70% of his economic rights for a fee of R$ 800,000. He made his first team debut for the club on 9 May, starting and scoring the winner in a 2–1 Campeonato Paulista home win over Novorizontino.

Mandaca subsequently returned to the youth setup, before being loaned out to Série B side Londrina on 30 March 2022. On 14 December, he moved to fellow league team Juventude also in a temporary deal.

On 12 January 2024, after being a starter in Ju's promotion to the Série A, Mandaca signed a permanent two-year contract with the club.

== Career statistics ==
As of 5 August 2025.

Club	Season	League			State League		Cup		Continental		Other		Total	
Club	Season	Division	Apps	Goals	Apps	Goals	Apps	Goals	Apps	Goals	Apps	Goals	Apps	Goals
CSP	2019	Paraibano	—		7	0	—		—		—		7	0
CSP	2020	Paraibano	—		10	2	—		—		—		10	2
CSP	Total		—		17	2	—		—		—		17	2
São Paulo Crystal (loan)	2019	Paraibano 2ª Divisão	—		3	0	—		—		—		3	0
Corinthians	2021	Série A	0	0	2	1	0	0	1 (Note: Appearance(s) in Copa Sudamericana)	0	—		3	1
Londrina (loan)	2022	Série B	31	1	—		—		—		—		31	1
Juventude	2023	Série B	23	1	10	2	1	0	—		—		34	3
Juventude	2024	Série A	30	4	11	2	5	0	—		—		46	6
Juventude	2025	Série A	15	1	8	1	1	0	—		—		24	2
Juventude	Total		68	6	29	5	7	0	—		—		104	11
Career total			99	7	51	8	7	0	1	0	0	0	158	15
