= Adriano Martins (footballer) =

Brazilian footballer (born 1997)

Personal information
- Full name: Adriano Martins da Fonseca
- Date of birth: 1 April 1997 (age 29)
- Place of birth: Rio de Janeiro, Brazil
- Height: 1.92 m (6 ft 4 in)
- Position: Centre back

Team information
- Current team: Atlético Goianiense

Youth career
- Penapolense
- 2017: Vitória

Senior career*
Years	Team	Apps	(Gls)
2018	Bonsucesso	8	(1)
2019	Uberlândia	13	(2)
2019	Francana	8	(3)
2020–2023	Novorizontino	61	(2)
2022	→ Uberlândia (loan)	3	(0)
2024–	Atlético Goianiense	84	(5)
2025	→ Juventude (loan)	8	(1)
- * Club domestic league appearances and goals as of 16 April 2026

Adriano Martins da Fonseca (born 1 April 1997), known as Adriano Martins, Adriano Mina or just Adriano, is a Brazilian professional footballer who plays as a central defender for Atlético Goianiense.

== Career ==
=== Early career ===
Born in Rio de Janeiro, Adriano Martins represented Penapolense and Vitória as a youth. He made his senior debut with Bonsucesso in the 2018 Campeonato Carioca Série B1.

Adriano began the 2019 season at Uberlândia. A regular starter, he scored twice in a 3–0 home win over Serranense on 5 May which sealed the club's promotion from the Campeonato Mineiro Módulo II. In July of that year, he joined Francana.

=== Novorizontino ===
Adriano moved to Novorizontino ahead of the 2020 campaign, but featured rarely in the club's consecutive promotions from the Série D to the Série B. On 16 December 2021, he was announced on loan at Paraná, but the move was cancelled late in the month.

On 4 February 2022, Adriano returned to Uberlândia on loan for the remainder of the 2022 Campeonato Mineiro. After only three matches, he returned to his parent club, but did not feature in any matches for the remainder of the year.

Adriano became a starter for Tigre during the 2023 season, helping in their promotion from the Campeonato Paulista Série A2 and becoming a key unit in the 2023 Série B.

=== Atlético Goianiense ===
On 5 January 2024, after being heavily linked to Corinthians, Adriano signed with fellow Série A side Atlético Goianiense.

== Career statistics ==
As of 5 February 2024

Club	Season	League			State League		Cup		Continental		Other		Total	
Club	Season	Division	Apps	Goals	Apps	Goals	Apps	Goals	Apps	Goals	Apps	Goals	Apps	Goals
Bonsucesso	2018	Carioca Série B1	—		8	1	—		—		—		8	1
Uberlândia	2019	Mineiro Módulo II	—		13	2	—		—		—		13	2
Francana	2019	Paulista 2ª Divisão	—		8	3	—		—		—		8	3
Novorizontino	2020	Série D	6	0	5	0	0	0	—		1 (Note: Appearance(s) in Copa Paulista)	0	12	0
Novorizontino	2021	Série C	3	0	0	0	—		—		—		3	0
Novorizontino	2022	Série B	0	0	—		—		—		—		0	0
Novorizontino	2023	Série B	35	1	12	1	—		—		—		47	2
Novorizontino	Subtotal		44	1	17	1	0	0	—		1	0	62	2
Uberlândia (loan)	2022	Mineiro	—		3	0	—		—		—		3	0
Atlético Goianiense	2024	Série A	0	0	5	0	0	0	—		—		5	0
Career total			44	1	54	7	0	0	0	0	1	0	99	8
