= Atlético Clube Goianiense =

Atlético Goianiense
- Full name: Atlético Clube Goianiense
- Nickname: Dragão (The Dragon)
- Founded: 2 April 1937; 89 years ago
- Ground: Antônio Accioly
- Capacity: 12.500
- President: Adson Batista
- Head coach: Roger Silva
- League: Campeonato Brasileiro Série B Campeonato Goiano
- 2025 2025: Série B, 11th of 20; Goiano, 3rd of 12
- Website: atleticogoianiense.com.br
| Home colors | Away colors | Third colors |

Atlético Clube Goianiense, usually known as Atlético Goianiense, is a Brazilian football team from the city of Goiânia, capital city of the Brazilian state of Goiás.

Atlético Goianiense is the oldest Goiânia city football club. The club is the first team of its state to win a national competition, which was the Série C. Atlético Goianiense made a comeback to Brazil's top level Série A in 2010 after a 23-year absence. In 2016, Atlético Goianiense won the title of the Campeonato Brasileiro Série B for the first time. The team's nickname translates to The Dragon. Due to recent 2016 Campeonato Brasileiro win, they were henceforth promoted to the Série A of brazilian football.

== History ==
On 2 April 1937, Nicanor Gordo and Joaquim Veiga founded the club, starting football in the newly founded city of Goiânia. Gordo and Veiga left the newly founded club in 1938, and joined Goiânia EC, which was another new club.

In 1944, the club competed in the first Campeonato Goiano, which was also the first official football championship in the state, and was contested between five clubs from Goiânia. The other teams were Goiânia, Vila Nova, Goiás and Campinas. Atlético Goianiense won the competition for its first title. In 1957, the club won the state championship without losing a match, also winning the Torneio dos Invictos, played in the same year.

In 1971, the team won the Torneio da Integração Nacional, beating Ponte Preta in the final. In 1990, after defeating América Mineiro in the penalty shootout, Atlético Goianiense won the Campeonato Brasileiro Série C.

In 2003, Atlético Goianiense finished in the state championship's last place, and was relegated to the following year's second division. In 2005, the club won the Goiás State Championship Second Division, being promoted to the following year's First Division. In 2006, the club finished in second place in the Goiás State Championship First Level, and returned to Serie C. In 2007, they became state champion for the first time in 19 years. The following year, they won the Serie C and were promoted to the 2009 Serie B. In the 2009 Serie B, Goianiense had a good season, finishing fourth and being promoted to the Serie A, for the first time since 1986, and going through four promotions in five years.

In their first season back in Serie A the club finished in 16th place and barely avoided relegation, only finishing above Vitoria on head to head results and sending them down with a 0–0 draw on the last matchday. Although the club barely avoided relegation, highlights of this season were beating third-placed team Corinthians twice, (3–1, 4–3) and two 3-0 victories against Palmeiras.

The 2011 season was better, with the club finishing 13th and qualifying for the 2012 Copa Sudamericana. They were involved in a relegation battle early into the season, but five straight wins in August steered the club away from relegation, and the club ended the season with a big 5–1 victory against America. That season they also won back-to-back state leagues.

In the 2012 Copa Sudamericana, the club was eliminated by Universidad Católica on away goals rule. In the league, the club was relegated and finished 19th.

The club's greatest achievement was in 2016, when they won the Campeonato Brasileiro Série B with two rounds to go.

The club's best international participation was in the 2022 Copa Sudamericana, where they had to play their matches at Estádio Serra Dourada because their main stadium did not meet CONMEBOL requirements. The club qualified for the tournament after finishing 9th in the 2021 Serie A. It was drawn into group F, topping the group with four wins out of six games. In the round of 16, they eliminated three-time Libertadores champions Club Olimpia on penalties, then in the quarter finals eliminated Uruguayan club Nacional 4–0 on aggregate to set up a semi-final with another South American powerhouse, São Paulo. In the first leg on 1 September, Goianiense won 3–1. In the return leg at Estadio Morumbi, São Paulo won 2-0 and tied the aggregate series, sending the match into penalties, where São Paulo won 4-2 and advanced to the final. In the Copa do Brasil the club also had their best ever participation, reaching the quarter finals and being eliminated by finalists Corinthians 4–3 on aggregate. They also won their sixteenth state championship this season, but in the Campeonato Brasileiro the club was not able to replicate the continental success and were relegated again.

== Honours ==
=== Official tournaments ===
National
| Competitions | Titles | Seasons |
|---|---|---|
| Campeonato Brasileiro Série B | 1 | 2016 |
| Campeonato Brasileiro Série C | 2 | 1990, 2008 |
State
| Competitions | Titles | Seasons |
| Campeonato Goiano | 18 | 1944, 1947, 1949, 1955, 1957, 1964, 1970, 1985, 1988, 2007, 2010, 2011, 2014, 2019, 2020, 2022, 2023, 2024 |
| Copa Goiás | 2 | 1968, 1998 |
| Campeonato Goiano Second Division | 1 | 2005 |

=== Others tournaments ===
==== National and inter-state ====
- Torneio da Integração Nacional (1): 1971
- Torneio Goiás-Maranhão (1): 1972

==== State ====
- Torneio Incentivo (2): 1975, 1977
- Torneio Início do Campeonato Goiano (8): 1944, 1952, 1956, 1962, 1970, 1984, 1985, 1986

==== City ====
- Campeonato Citadino de Goiânia (1): 1938
- Taça Cidade de Goiânia (2): 1964, 1971
- Copa Goiânia (1): 1998

=== Runners-up ===
- Campeonato Goiano (19): 1946, 1948, 1952, 1954, 1958, 1959, 1961, 1967, 1972, 1979, 1986, 1987, 1991, 1996, 2006, 2009, 2012, 2013, 2026
- Copa Leonino Caiado (1): 1974

=== Women's Football ===
- Campeonato Goiano de Futebol Feminino (4): 1990, 1991, 1992, 1993

== Stadium ==
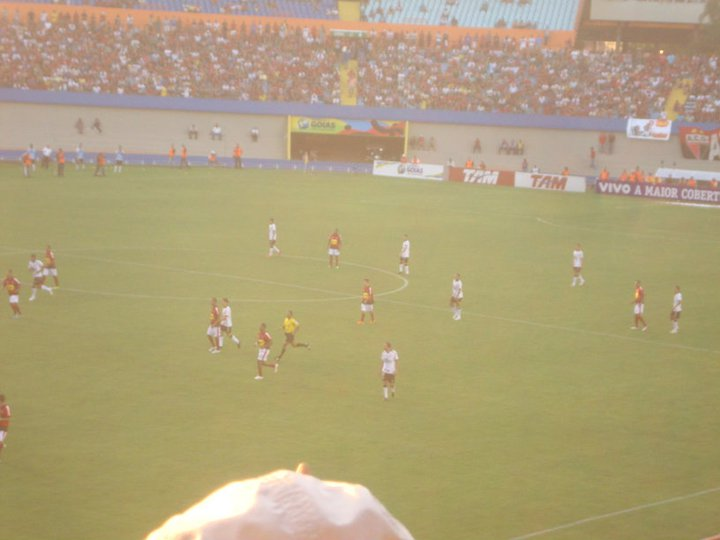
Match between Atlético Goianense and Corinthians.

The club plays its home matches at Estádio Antônio Accioly, which has a maximum capacity of approximately 12,000 people.

Atlético Goianiense's training center is called CT Urias Magalhães. Atlético Goianiense has another training ground for youth players at the city of Aparecida de Goiânia.

== Club's colors ==
Atlético's usual home colors

The club's colors are red and black. It is composed of a red and black horizontal striped shirt, white short and red and black horizontal striped socks.

== Symbols and anthem ==
Atlético Goianiense's mascot is a red dragon symbolizing the club. The club is nicknamed Dragão, meaning Dragon. The flag is similar to the club's home kit, with red and black horizontal stripes, and the logo in the center.

Atlético's official anthem was composed by Joaquim Jayme, however, there is another, non-official, anthem.

== Current squad ==
=== First team squad ===
As of 4 October 2026

Note: Flags indicate national team as defined under FIFA eligibility rules; some limited exceptions apply. Players may hold more than one non-FIFA nationality.

| No. | Pos. | Nation | Player |
|---|---|---|---|
| — | GK | BRA | Léo Rosa |
| — | GK | BRA | Paulo Henrique |
| — | GK | BRA | Paulo Vítor |
| — | GK | BRA | Vladimir |
| — | GK | BRA | Yuri |
| — | DF | BRA | Adriano Martins |
| — | DF | PAR | Junior Barreto (on loan from Olimpia) |
| — | DF | BRA | Matheus Bebeto |
| — | DF | BRA | Natã Felipe (on loan from Juventude) |
| — | DF | BRA | Tito |
| — | DF | BRA | Ewerthon |
| — | DF | BRA | Felipe Guimarães (on loan from Coritiba) |
| — | DF | BRA | Guilherme Lopes (on loan from Red Bull Bragantino) |
| — | DF | BRA | Gustavo Daniel |
| — | DF | BRA | Jampierre |
| — | DF | BRA | Kauã Henrique |
| — | DF | BRA | Yuri Silva |
| — | DF | BRA | Warley |
| — | MF | BRA | Cristiano (on loan from Noroeste) |
| — | MF | BRA | Daniel Peixoto (on loan from Noroeste) |

| No. | Pos. | Nation | Player |
|---|---|---|---|
| — | MF | BRA | Geovane |
| — | MF | BRA | Henrique Freitas |
| — | MF | BRA | Igor Henrique |
| — | MF | BRA | Klebert |
| — | MF | BRA | Leandro Vilela |
| — | MF | BRA | Netinho |
| — | MF | URU | David Terans (on loan from Fluminense) |
| — | MF | BRA | Guilherme Marques (captain) |
| — | FW | BRA | Brenno |
| — | FW | BRA | Bruno José |
| — | FW | BRA | Gabriel Paé |
| — | FW | BRA | Geovany Soares (on loan from Atlético Tubarão) |
| — | FW | BRA | Gustavo Coutinho (on loan from Sport Recife) |
| — | FW | BRA | Gustavo Maia |
| — | FW | GBS | João Pedro |
| — | FW | PAN | Kahiser Lenis |
| — | FW | BRA | Léo Tocantins (on loan from Noroeste) |
| — | FW | BRA | Marrony (on loan from Remo) |
| — | FW | BRA | Matheusinho |

=== Youth team ===
Note: Flags indicate national team as defined under FIFA eligibility rules; some limited exceptions apply. Players may hold more than one non-FIFA nationality.

| No. | Pos. | Nation | Player |
|---|---|---|---|
| — | GK | BRA | Railson |
| — | DF | BRA | Kaio Cavalo |
| — | MF | BRA | Anthony Matheus |

| No. | Pos. | Nation | Player |
|---|---|---|---|
| — | MF | BRA | Kaio Gois |
| — | FW | BRA | Alan |

=== Out on loan ===
Note: Flags indicate national team as defined under FIFA eligibility rules; some limited exceptions apply. Players may hold more than one non-FIFA nationality.

| No. | Pos. | Nation | Player |
|---|---|---|---|
| — | DF | BRA | João Maistro (at Brusque until 30 November 2026) |
| — | DF | BRA | Mateus Macedo (at Bonsucesso until 30 September 2026) |
| — | DF | BRA | Marcão (at Paços de Ferreira until 30 June 2027) |
| — | DF | BRA | Guilherme Romão (at Santa Clara until 30 June 2027) |

| No. | Pos. | Nation | Player |
|---|---|---|---|
| — | MF | BRA | Assis (at Athletic-MG until 30 November 2026) |
| — | FW | BRA | Derek (at Náutico until 30 November 2026) |
| — | FW | URU | Kevin Ramírez (at Chapecoense until 31 December 2026) |
| — | FW | BRA | Thayllon (at Paysandu until 30 November 2026) |

=== First-team staff ===
| Position | Name |
|---|---|
| Head coach | Roger Silva |
| Assistant coach | Eduardo Abdo |
| Assistant coach | Renato Gheller |
| Assistant coach | Luciano Deitos |
| Assistant coach | Renan Brito |
| Executive manager | Júnior Mortosa |
| Fitness coach | Robson Gomes |
| Fitness coach | Diego Inácio |
| Goalkeeping coach | Bruno Uchôa |
| Goalkeeping coach | Cláudio Cerqueira |
| Performance analyst | Davy Ferreira |
| Doctor | Gleyder Sousa |
| Doctor | Avimar Teodoro |
| Doctor | Pablo Rocha |
| Doctor | Rafael Pena |
| Physiotherapy coordinator | Gustavo Ignácio |
| Physiotherapist | Roque Alencar |
| Physiotherapist | Bruno Braz |
| Nutritionist | Icaro Chalegre |
| Psychologist | Ana Isabela Egídio |
| Cameraman | Alexandre Alves |
| Masseuse | Daniel Oliveira |
| Masseuse | Hercules Baia |
| Kit man | Alex Sandro |
| Kit man | Antonio Francisco |
| Security | Marcelo Ricardo |

== Notable head coaches ==
- (Brazil) Arthur Neto
- (Brazil) Geninho
- (Brazil) Hélio dos Anjos
- (Brazil) Jair Ventura
- (Brazil) Jorginho
- (Brazil) Marcelo Cabo
- (Brazil) Mauro Fernandes
- (Brazil) Vagner Mancini
- (Japan) Wagner Lopes
