= Jadson (footballer, born 1993) =

Brazilian footballer

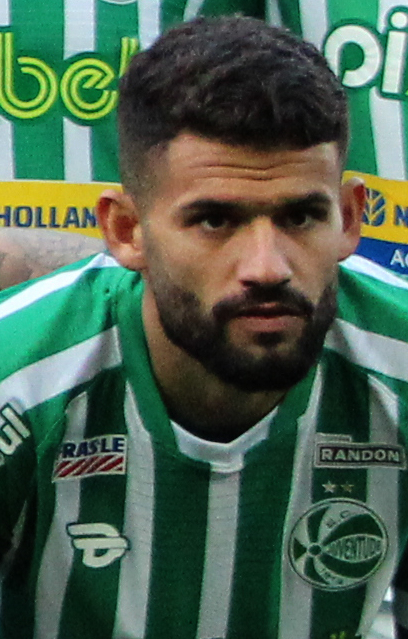
- Jadson with Juventude in 2022

Personal information
- Full name: Jadson Alves dos Santos
- Date of birth: 30 August 1993 (age 33)
- Place of birth: São Bernardo do Campo, Brazil
- Height: 1.71 m (5 ft 7 in)
- Position: Defensive midfielder

Team information
- Current team: Athletico Paranaense
- Number: 16

Youth career
- CFZ do Rio
- 2009–2010: Flamengo
- 2010–2012: Botafogo

Senior career*
Years	Team	Apps	(Gls)
2012–2013	Botafogo	42	(1)
2013–2018	Udinese	1	(0)
2015–2016	→ Atlético Paranaense (loan)	21	(1)
2016	→ Santa Cruz (loan)	17	(0)
2017	→ Ponte Preta (loan)	34	(1)
2018	Fluminense	45	(3)
2019–2021	Cruzeiro	46	(1)
2020	→ Bahia (loan)	10	(1)
2021–2025	Juventude	207	(6)
2026–	Athletico Paranaense	29	(0)

International career
2013	Brazil U20	0	(0)
- * Club domestic league appearances and goals as of 16:24, 10 November 2026 (UTC)

Jadson Alves dos Santos (born 30 August 1993), simply known as Jadson, is a Brazilian professional footballer who plays as defensive midfielder for Athletico Paranaense.

After making his senior debut with Botafogo, Jadson moved to Udinese in 2013 but served loan stints back in his home country afterwards. He later represented Fluminense, Cruzeiro and Bahia before enjoying a five-season spell at Juventude, where he was an undisputed starter. In 2026, he moved to Athletico Paranaense.

== Career statistics ==
As of 10 November 2026

Appearances and goals by club, season and competition
Club	Season	League			State League		Cup		Continental		Other		Total	
Club	Season	Division	Apps	Goals	Apps	Goals	Apps	Goals	Apps	Goals	Apps	Goals	Apps	Goals
Botafogo	2011	Série A	—		1	0	—		—		—		1	0
Botafogo	2012	Série A	29	1	4	0	1	0	1 (Note: Appearance(s) in Copa Sudamericana)	0	—		35	1
Botafogo	2013	Série A	—		8	0	3	0	—		—		11	0
Botafogo	Total		29	1	13	0	4	0	1	0	—		47	1
Udinese	2013–14	Serie A	1	0	—		0	0	—		—		1	0
Udinese	2014–15	Serie A	0	0	—		0	0	—		—		0	0
Udinese	Total		1	0	—		0	0	—		—		1	0
Atlético Paranaense	2015	Série A	10	0	—		2	0	0	0	—		12	0
Atlético Paranaense	2016	Série A	1	0	10	1	2	0	—		2 (Note: Appearance(s) in Primeira Liga)	0	15	1
Atlético Paranaense	Total		11	0	10	1	4	0	0	0	2	0	27	1
Santa Cruz	2016	Série A	17	0	—		—		3	0	—		20	0
Ponte Preta	2017	Série A	21	0	13	0	2	0	3	1	—		39	1
Fluminense	2018	Série A	33	2	12	1	4	0	10	0	—		59	3
Cruzeiro	2019	Série A	14	0	9	0	4	0	4 (Note: Appearance(s) in Copa Libertadores)	1	—		31	1
Cruzeiro	2020	Série B	14	0	—		—		—		—		14	0
Cruzeiro	2021	Série B	1	0	8	1	2	0	—		—		11	1
Cruzeiro	Total		29	0	17	1	6	0	4	1	—		56	2
Bahia (loan)	2020	Série A	5	0	5	1	0	0	1	0	1 (Note: Appearance(s) in Copa do Nordeste)	0	12	1
Juventude	2021	Série A	25	0	—		—		—		—		25	0
Juventude	2022	Série A	33	2	11	0	3	0	—		—		47	2
Juventude	2023	Série B	34	2	11	0	1	0	—		—		46	2
Juventude	2024	Série A	33	1	16	1	7	0	—		—		56	2
Juventude	2025	Série A	35	0	9	0	1	0	—		—		45	0
Juventude	Total		160	5	47	1	12	0	—		—		219	6
Athletico Paranaense	2026	Série A	27	0	2	0	3	0	—		—		32	0
Career total			343	8	119	5	35	0	22	2	3	0	512	15

== Honours ==
Botafogo

- Campeonato Carioca: 2013

Atlético Paranaense

- Campeonato Paranaense: 2016

Cruzeiro

- Campeonato Mineiro: 2019

Bahia

- Campeonato Baiano: 2020
