= Emerson Batalla =

Colombian footballer (born 2001)

Personal information
- Full name: Emerson Geovanny Batalla Martínez
- Date of birth: 30 June 2001 (age 25)
- Place of birth: Tumaco, Colombia
- Height: 1.71 m (5 ft 7 in)
- Position: Winger

Team information
- Current team: Atletico Bucaramanga
- Number: 15

Youth career
- América de Cali

Senior career*
Years	Team	Apps	(Gls)
2020–2022	América de Cali	33	(2)
2022–	Talleres	7	(0)
2022	→ Patronato (loan)	2	(1)
2023	→ Independiente Medellín (loan)	17	(1)
2023	→ Santa Fe (loan)	16	(1)
2024	→ Alianza (loan)	30	(4)
2025	→ Juventude (loan)	32	(7)
2026	Atletico Bucaramanga	0	(0)
- * Club domestic league appearances and goals as of 6 March 2026

Emerson Geovanny Batalla Martínez (born 30 June 2001) is a Colombian footballer who plays as a right winger for Colombian club Atlético Bucaramanga.

== Career ==
Born in Tumaco, Batalla began his career with América de Cali, making his first team debut on 7 March 2020, in a 1–1 away draw against Once Caldas. He started to feature regularly in the following year, and scored his first goal on 11 September 2021, netting the winner in a 1–0 away success over Deportivo Cali.

On 13 February 2022, Batalla was announced at Argentine Primera División side Talleres de Córdoba. On 15 June, however, after failing to establish himself at the club, he was loaned to fellow league team Patronato for one year.

On 29 December 2022, Batalla returned to Colombia after signing a one-year loan deal with Independiente Medellín. The following 13 July, however, he joined Independiente Santa Fe also in a temporary deal.

In December 2023, Batalla agreed to a one-year loan deal with Alianza FC also in the Colombian top tier. On 13 January 2025, still owned by Talleres, he was announced at Campeonato Brasileiro Série A side Juventude.

== Career statistics ==
As of 15 January 2025.

Club	Season	League			Cup		Continental		Other		Total	
Club	Season	Division	Apps	Goals	Apps	Goals	Apps	Goals	Apps	Goals	Apps	Goals
América de Cali	2020	Categoría Primera A	8	0	1	0	1 (Note: Appearance(s) in Copa Libertadores)	0	—		10	0
América de Cali	2021	Categoría Primera A	20	1	3	0	2 (Note: Appearance(s) in Copa Sudamericana)	0	2 (Note: Appearance(s) in Superliga Colombiana)	0	27	1
América de Cali	2022	Categoría Primera A	5	1	0	0	—		—		5	1
América de Cali	Total		33	2	4	0	3	0	2	0	42	2
Talleres	2022	Primera División	7 (Note: Soccerway counts Copa de la Liga Profesional appearances as league appearances.)	0	0	0	1	0	—		8	0
Patronato (loan)	2022	Primera División	2	1	1	0	—		—		3	1
Independiente Medellín (loan)	2023	Categoría Primera A	17	1	0	0	8	2	—		25	3
Santa Fe (loan)	2023	Categoría Primera A	16	1	3	0	—		—		19	1
Alianza (loan)	2024	Categoría Primera A	30	4	2	0	7	4	—		39	8
Juventude (loan)	2025	Série A	0	0	0	0	—		0	0	0	0
Career total			105	9	10	0	19	6	2	0	136	15
