= Ibiaçá =

Municipality in Rio Grande do Sul, Brazil

Coordinates: 28°03′S 51°52′W

- Municipality
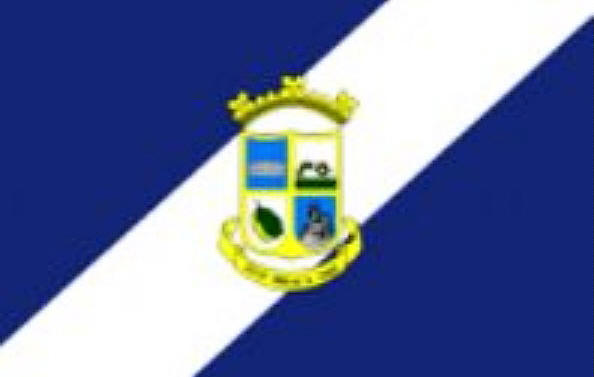
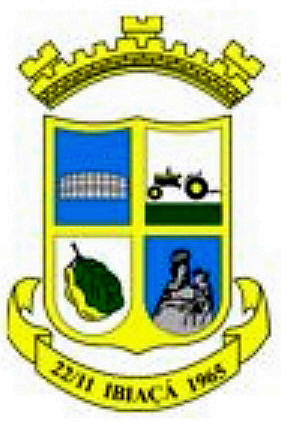
- Flag Coat of arms
- Interactive map of Ibiaçá
- Country: Brazil
- Time zone: UTC−3 (BRT)

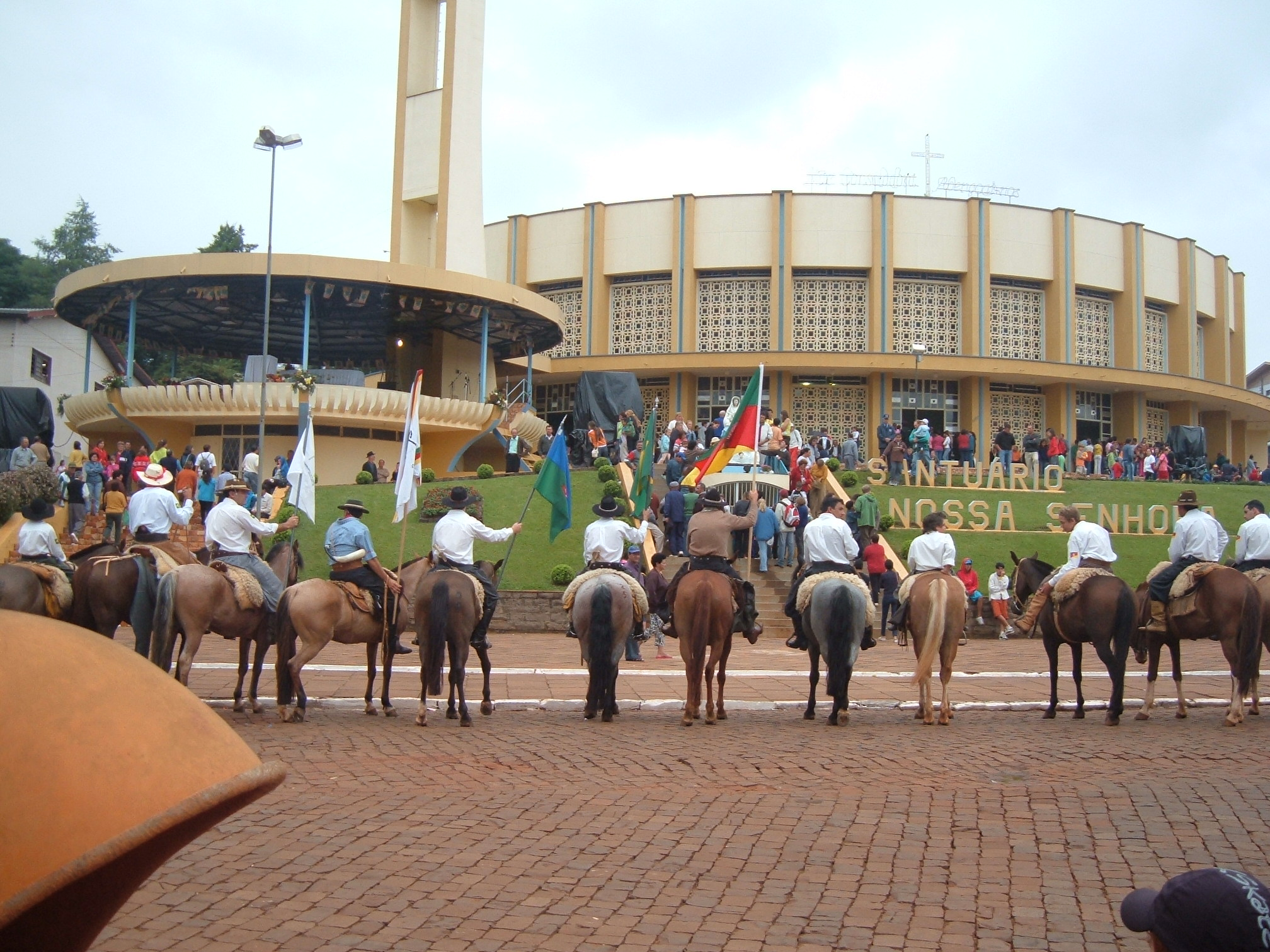
Knights in front of the Nossa Senhora Sanctuary in Ibiaçá

Ibiaçá is a municipality in the state of Rio Grande do Sul, Brazil. As of 2020, the estimated population was 4,699.

== See also ==
- List of municipalities in Rio Grande do Sul
