= Emerson Galego =

Brazilian football player

Personal information
- Full name: Emerson Mendes Carvalho
- Date of birth: 10 August 1999 (age 27)
- Place of birth: Casa Nova, Brazil
- Height: 1.80 m (5 ft 11 in)
- Position: Forward

Team information
- Current team: Figueirense (on loan from Juventude)
- Number: 99

Senior career*
Years	Team	Apps	(Gls)
2018–2019	1º de Maio	11	(0)
2020	ASEEV	0	(0)
2021	Juazeirense	2	(0)
2022	Santa Cruz de Natal	6	(1)
2023	Petrolina	13	(6)
2023	Santa Cruz	13	(4)
2023	Juventus-SP	0	(0)
2023	Mineiros	4	(2)
2024–2025	Petrolina	20	(5)
2024	→ ABC (loan)	2	(0)
2024	→ Mineiros (loan)	6	(3)
2024–2025	→ Ypiranga-RS (loan)	12	(8)
2025–	Juventude	7	(0)
2026–	→ Figueirense (loan)	14	(6)
- * Club domestic league appearances and goals as of 10 November 2026

Emerson Mendes de Carvalho (born 10 August 1999), known as Emerson Galego or just Galego, is a Brazilian footballer who plays as a forward for Figueirense, on loan from Juventude. He was the top scorer of the Campeonato Pernambucano in 2023 with 6 goals for Petrolina, and the Campeonato Gaúcho in 2025 with 8 goals for Ypiranga-RS.

== Career ==
=== Early career ===
Born in Casa Nova in the state of Bahia, Galego played in the Campeonato Pernambucano Série A2 for 1º de Maio in 2019. He later had spells with Juazeirense and Santa Cruz de Natal. With Petrolina in 2023, he was the top scorer of the Campeonato Pernambucano with 6 goals in 13 games; his exploits helped the club to the semi-finals for the first time, in addition to first-ever qualifications to the Copa do Brasil and the Campeonato Brasileiro Série D.

In the second half of 2023, Galego took part in Série D with Santa Cruz of Recife, scoring four goals as they were eliminated in the first stage. He finished the year with brief spells at Juventus da Mooca in the Copa Paulista and Mineiros in the Campeonato Goiano Third Division.

=== Petrolina ===
Galego agreed to return to Petrolina for the 2024 season. On 28 February, in the first round of the national cup, he scored the final goal of a 3–2 home win over Cascavel, earning his club R$945,000.

In July 2024, Galego joined ABC for the remainder of the Campeonato Brasileiro Série C season. After a brief return to Mineiros, he moved again in October to Ypiranga, to play in the Copa FGF in the state of Rio Grande do Sul, and renewed his contract at the end of the year. In the Campeonato Gaúcho at the start of 2025, he was the top scorer with 8 goals over 12 games, including one in the second leg of the 4–1 aggregate win over São Luiz for the Taça Farroupilha, earning his team a place in the next year's Copa do Brasil.

=== Juventude ===
At the end of March 2025, 25-year-old Galego joined a Campeonato Brasileiro Série A side for the first time, signing a three-year deal at Juventude. The buying club acquired 40% of his economic rights. In October, he was one of several players demoted to the reserve team in the Copa FGF. Having not scored in 15 first-team appearances, he was loaned in March 2026 to Figueirense in Série C.
