= Ênio (footballer, born 2001) =

Brazilian footballer (born 2001)

Personal information
- Full name: Sebastião Enio Santos de Almeida
- Date of birth: 3 March 2001 (age 25)
- Place of birth: Belém, Brazil
- Height: 1.68 m (5 ft 6 in)
- Position: Attacking midfielder

Team information
- Current team: Al-Jabalain (on loan from Juventude)
- Number: 10

Youth career
- –2020: Botafogo

Senior career*
Years	Team	Apps	(Gls)
2020–2023	Botafogo	16	(1)
2022–2023	→ RWDM (loan)	0	(0)
2023	RWDM	0	(0)
2024	Amazonas	36	(2)
2025–	Juventude	35	(4)
2026	→ Chapecoense (loan)	17	(1)
2026–	→ Al-Jabalain (loan)	0	(0)
- * Club domestic league appearances and goals as of 9 April 2026

Sebastião Enio Santos de Almeida (born 3 March 2001), commonly known as Ênio, is a Brazilian footballer who plays for Al-Jabalain, on loan from Juventude as an attacking midfielder.

== Club career ==
On 25 August 2022, Ênio joined RWDM in Belgium on loan.

In January 2024, Ênio signed with Amazonas.

== Career statistics ==
=== Club ===
As of 6 July 2020.

Club	Season	League			State league		Cup		Continental		Other		Total	
Club	Season	Division	Apps	Goals	Apps	Goals	Apps	Goals	Apps	Goals	Apps	Goals	Apps	Goals
Botafogo	2020	Série A	0	0	3 (Note: Appearance(s) in Campeonato Carioca)	0	0	0	0	0	0	0	3	0
Career total			0	0	3	0	0	0	0	0	0	0	3	0

== Honours ==
Botafogo

- Campeonato Brasileiro Série B: 2021
