= Estádio Alfredo Jaconi =

Football stadium in Caxias do Sul, Rio Grande do Sul, Brazil

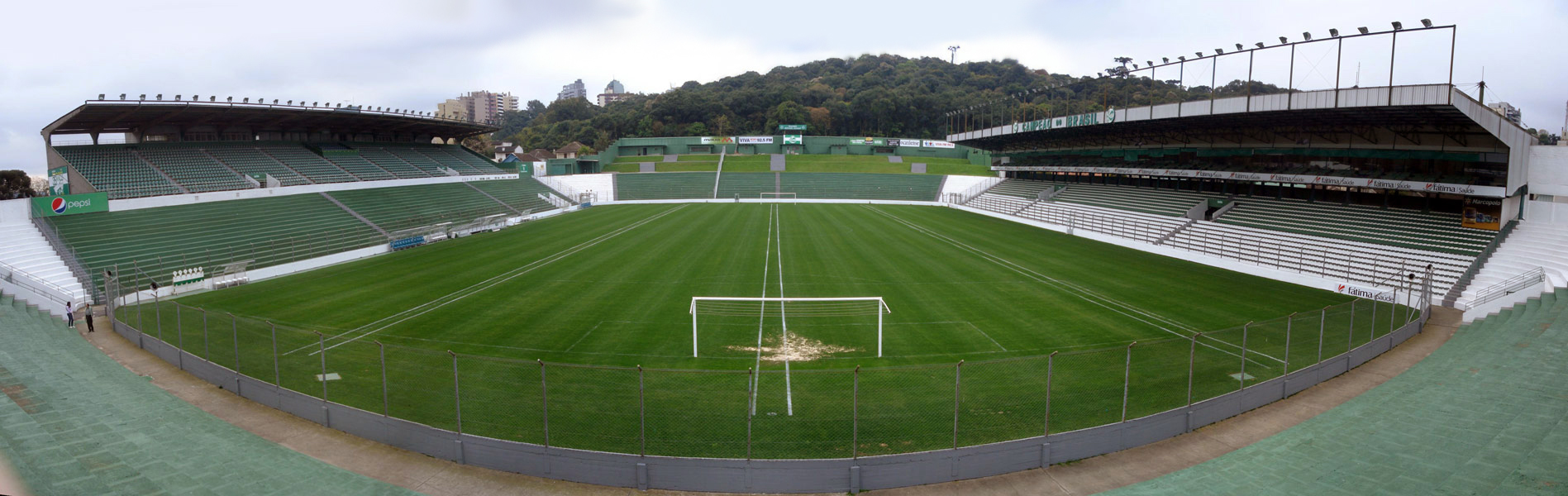
- Sisbrace
- Interactive map of Estádio Alfredo Jaconi
- Location: Caxias do Sul, Rio Grande do Sul, Brazil
- Coordinates: 29.162°S 51.176°W
- Owner: Esporte Clube Juventude
- Capacity: 19,924
- Surface: grass

Construction
- Opened: March 23, 1975

Tenant
- Esporte Clube Juventude

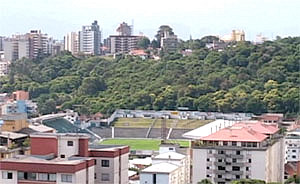
Estádio Alfredo Jaconi in Caxias do Sul, Rio Grande do Sul, Brazil

Estádio Alfredo Jaconi is a football stadium inaugurated on March 23, 1975, during the centennial commemoration of the state's Italian Colonization, in Caxias do Sul, Rio Grande do Sul, Brazil, with a maximum capacity of 30,519 people. The stadium is owned by Esporte Clube Juventude. Its formal name honors Alfredo Jaconi (1910–1952), who was a player, a manager and a director of Juventude during the 1930s and the 1940s.

== History ==
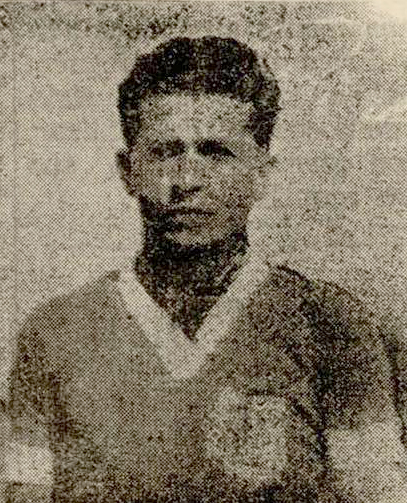
Alfredo Jaconi, the namesake of the stadium

The stadium was built on the site of Juventude's previous stadium, named Quinta dos Pinheiros. construction started in 1972, ending three years later, in 1975, by the club's president at the time, Willy Sanvitto.

The inaugural match was played on March 3, 1975, when Juventude and Flamengo drew 0-0.

On April 4, 1975, the first goal of the stadium was scored by Sociedade Esportiva Palmeiras's player Ronaldo, when Palmeiras beat Juventude 3–0.

In January, 1999, the construction of the cabins and of the bleacher coverings started. As of 2005, the first part of the reformation was almost completed.

On June 21, 1999, the first leg of the Copa do Brasil final was played at the stadium. Juventude beat Botafogo 2–1. Juventude, after a draw in the second leg, won the competition.

On February 16, 2000, the stadium was used for the first time in a Copa Libertadores de América match. Juventude beat El Nacional of Ecuador 1–0.

The stadium's attendance record currently stands at 27,740, set on November 27, 2002 when Grêmio beat Juventude 1–0.
