= Esporte Clube Avenida =

Avenida
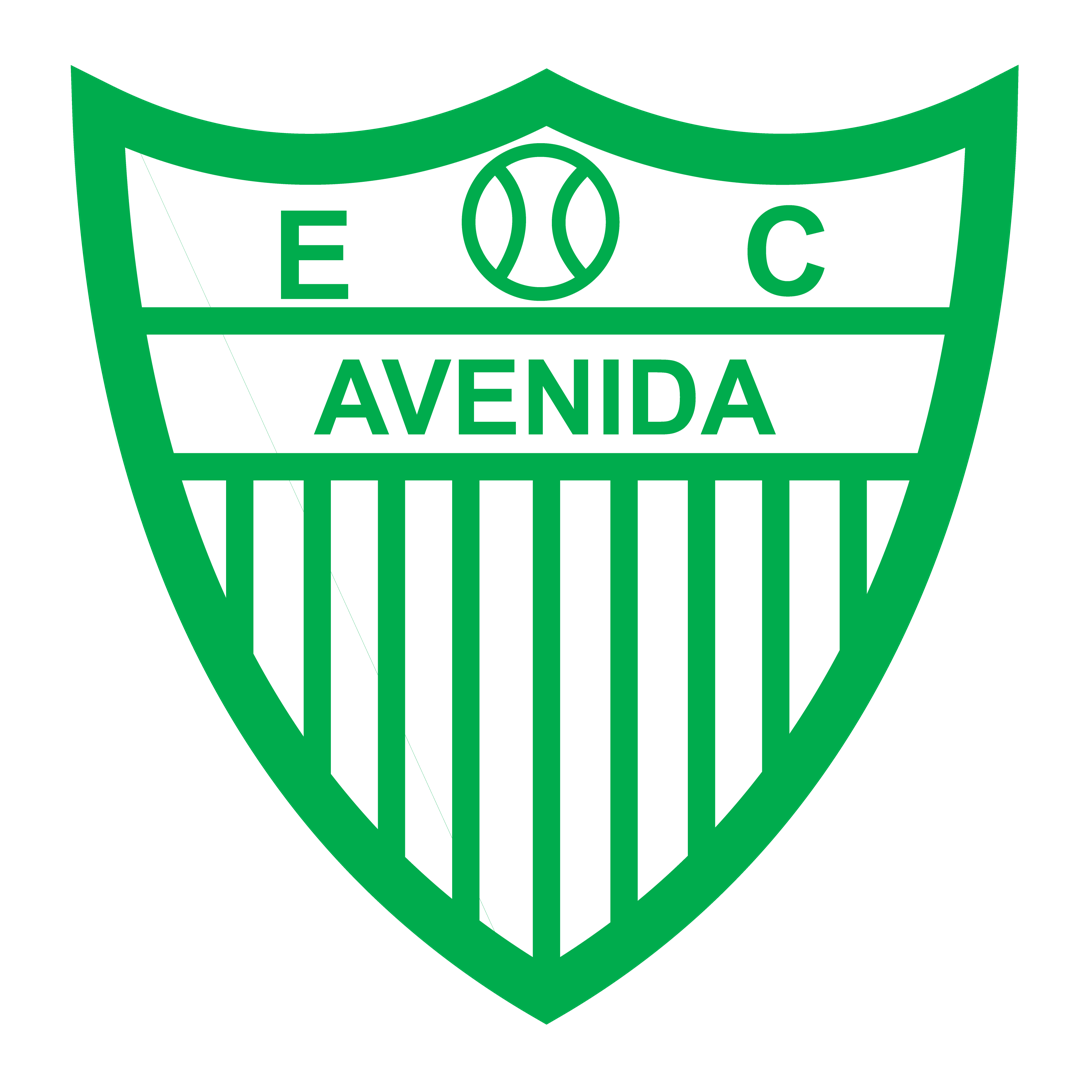
- Full name: Esporte Clube Avenida
- Nicknames: Nida; Periquito; Alviverde; Clube do Povo
- Founded: January 6, 1944 (82 years ago)
- Ground: Estádio dos Eucaliptos
- Capacity: 3,000
- President: Jair Eich
- Head Coach: Fabiano Daitx
- League: Campeonato Gaúcho
- 2025: Gaúcho, 9th of 12
- Website: www.esporteclubeavenida.com.br
Home colors	Away colors

Esporte Clube Avenida, commonly referred to as Avenida, is a Brazilian football club based in Santa Cruz do Sul, Rio Grande do Sul. It currently plays in Campeonato Gaúcho Série A1, the first level of the Rio Grande do Sul state football league.

== History ==
The club was founded on January 6, 1944. Avenida merged with Futebol Clube Santa Cruz, its rival, in the 1960s to form Associação Santa Cruz do Futebol, due to financial difficulties, but the merger was a failure, and both clubs continued being separate teams. Between 1990 and 1997, the club's football department was closed. They competed in the Campeonato Gaúcho in 2000 and in 2001. Avenida won the Campeonato Gaúcho Second Level in 2011.

== Honours ==
- Campeonato Gaúcho Série A2
  - Winners (1): 2011
- Copa FGF
  - Winners (1): 2018

== Stadium ==
Esporte Clube Avenida play their home games at Estádio dos Eucaliptos. The stadium has a maximum capacity of 3,000 people.
