= Esporte Clube Juventude =

Brazilian association football club based in Caxias do Sul, Rio Grande do Sul, Brazil

Juventude
- Full name: Esporte Clube Juventude
- Nicknames: Verdão; Juve; Alviverde; Ju
- Founded: 29 June 1913; 113 years ago
- Ground: Alfredo Jaconi
- Capacity: 19,924
- President: Fábio Pizzamiglio
- Head coach: Maurício Barbieri
- League: Campeonato Brasileiro Série B Campeonato Gaúcho
- 2025 2025: Série A, 19th of 20 (relegated); Gaúcho, 3rd of 12
- Website: juventude.com.br
Home colors	Away colors	Third colors

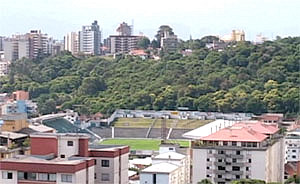
Estádio Alfredo Jaconi in Caxias do Sul, Rio Grande do Sul, Brazil

Esporte Clube Juventude (Brazilian Portuguese pronunciation: [isˈpɔʁtʃi ˈklubi ʒuvẽˈtudʒi]), or simply Juventude, is a Brazilian football club in Caxias do Sul, Rio Grande do Sul. The club currently competes in the Campeonato Brasileiro Série B, the second tier of Brazilian football, as well as in Campeonato Gaúcho, the Rio Grande do Sul state football league. Major titles won by the club include the 1999 Copa do Brasil, the 1994 Campeonato Brasileiro Série B and the 1998 Campeonato Gaúcho. Their greatest rival is Caxias, with whom it contests the Caxias do Sul derby, also known as Ca–Ju.

== History ==
Juventude was founded on June 29, 1913, by 35 youngsters from Caxias do Sul, descendants of Italian immigrants, being one of the first football clubs in that community. Antônio Chiaradia Neto was chosen as the club's first president.

On July 20, 1913, Juventude played its first game, against Serrano, from the city of Carlos Barbosa, Rio Grande do Sul. The game ended 4–0 in favor of Juventude.

On March 8, 1915, Juventude lost its first game ever. Fußball, from the nearby town of Montenegro, beat Juventude 4–1, ending a 23-game invincibility streak.

On October 10, 1919, Juventude joined the Rio Grande do Sul state football association

In 1920, the club became professional after signing some Uruguayan players.

On December 11, 1975, the first match against Caxias was played, which ended 1–0 to Juventude. The goal was scored by Da Silva. This match is known as the Ca-Ju derby.

On May 25, 1993, Juventude signed a partnership with Parmalat, bringing more investment to the club.

On December 4, 1994, Juventude won the second division of Campeonato Brasileiro, which was the first national title won by the club, gaining promotion to the first division.

On June 7, 1998, Juventude won the Campeonato Gaúcho without losing a single match.

On June 27, 1999, Juventude won its most important national title, the Copa do Brasil, gaining the right to contest the Copa Libertadores in the following year.

In 2000, Juventude played the Copa Libertadores for the first time, but the club was eliminated in the first stage.

In 2013, Juventude finished 2nd in Série D and was promoted to Série C for the 2014 season. They ascended again to the Série B in 2017.

Juventude returned to the top division of Brazilian Football Série A after a 13-year absence by finishing 3rd in the 2020 Campeonato Brasileiro Série B. In 2021, they finished in 16th in the tournament, ensuring they remain in Série A for the 2022 championship.

== Stadium ==
Juventude's stadium is Estádio Alfredo Jaconi, inaugurated in 1975, with a maximum capacity of 23,519 people.

== Honours ==
=== Official tournaments ===
National
Competitions	Titles	Seasons
Copa do Brasil	1	1999
Campeonato Brasileiro Série B	1	1994
State
Competitions	Titles	Seasons
Campeonato Gaúcho	1	1998
Copa FGF	2^{s}	2011, 2012
Copa Governador do Estado	2	1975, 1976

- record
- ^{s} shared record

=== Others tournaments ===
==== State ====
- Campeonato do Interior Gaúcho (18): 1964, 1965, 1966, 1986, 1991, 1993, 1994, 1995, 1996, 1998, 2001, 2006, 2007, 2008, 2011, 2021, 2025, 2026
- Copa Serrana (1): 2014 (reserve team)

==== City ====
- Campeonato Citadino de Caxias do Sul (23): 1920, 1921, 1922, 1923, 1924, 1925, 1926,1928, 1929, 1930, 1931, 1932, 1933, 1934, 1935, 1936, 1938, 1939, 1940, 1941, 1949, 1950, 1952
- Torneio Extra (1): 1952
- Torneio Início (8): 1936, 1941, 1942, 1943, 1945, 1948, 1949, 1950
- Torneio Encerramento (2): 1940, 1948
- Torneio Dia Futebol (1): 1941

=== Runners-up ===
- Campeonato Brasileiro Série B (2): 2023, 2026
- Campeonato Brasileiro Série D (1): 2013
- Campeonato Gaúcho (8): 1965, 1994, 1996, 2001, 2007, 2008, 2016, 2024

== Anthem ==
The club's official anthem lyrics were composed by Ernani Falcão, and the music by Rodolfo Storchi.

There is another anthem, which is an unofficial one, and was composed (both the lyrics and the music) by Paulo Gazola, and is called Hino da Volta do Ju, meaning Anthem of Ju's Return.

== Current squad ==
As of 23 September 2026.

Note: Flags indicate national team as defined under FIFA eligibility rules; some limited exceptions apply. Players may hold more than one non-FIFA nationality.

No.	Pos.	Nation	Player
2	DF	BRA	Raí Ramos
3	DF	BRA	Titi
4	DF	BRA	Messias
5	MF	BRA	Luan Martins (on loan from Primavera)
6	DF	BRA	Wadson (on loan from Anapolina)
7	MF	BRA	Pablo Roberto (on loan from Fortaleza)
8	MF	BRA	Lucas Mineiro (on loan from Cuiabá)
9	FW	BRA	Alan Kardec
10	FW	POR	Marcos Paulo Costa
11	FW	BRA	Fábio Lima
12	GK	BRA	Pedro Rocha
13	DF	BRA	Aderlan
16	DF	BRA	Diogo Barbosa
17	FW	URU	Manuel Castro
18	FW	PAR	Luis Amarilla (on loan from Cerro Porteño)
20	FW	BRA	Allanzinho (on loan from Fortaleza)
21	GK	BRA	Ruan Carneiro
22	DF	BRA	Nathan Santos (on loan from Santos)

No.	Pos.	Nation	Player
25	FW	BRA	Alisson Safira
26	MF	SEN	Iba Ly (on loan from São Paulo)
27	MF	BRA	Ray Breno (on loan from Vasco da Gama)
28	DF	BRA	Alan Ruschel (captain)
29	MF	BRA	Gabriel Pires
30	DF	BRA	Patryck Lanza (on loan from São Paulo)
31	GK	BRA	Zé Henrique
34	DF	BRA	Rodrigo Sam
43	DF	BRA	Bernardo
44	MF	BRA	Luis Mandaca
47	DF	BRA	Marcos Paulo Lima
72	FW	BRA	Lucas Alves
73	FW	BRA	Juan Christian (on loan from Riga)
75	MF	BRA	Raí Silva
88	MF	BRA	Davi Góes
93	GK	BRA	Jandrei (on loan from São Paulo)
97	DF	BRA	Gabriel Pinheiro (on loan from Volta Redonda)
—	DF	BRA	Luiz Eduardo

=== Youth team ===
Note: Flags indicate national team as defined under FIFA eligibility rules; some limited exceptions apply. Players may hold more than one non-FIFA nationality.

No.	Pos.	Nation	Player
14	DF	BRA	Mateus Schaffer
53	MF	BRA	Kaynan

=== Out on loan ===
Note: Flags indicate national team as defined under FIFA eligibility rules; some limited exceptions apply. Players may hold more than one non-FIFA nationality.

No.	Pos.	Nation	Player
—	DF	BRA	Abner (at Riga until 30 June 2027)
—	DF	BRA	Natã Felipe (at Atlético Goianiense until 30 November 2026)
—	FW	BRA	Caíque Trindade (at São José-RS until 30 September 2026)

No.	Pos.	Nation	Player
—	FW	BRA	Emerson Galego (at Figueirense until 30 November 2026)
—	FW	BRA	Ênio (at Al-Jabalain until 30 June 2027)

== Technical staff ==
- Head coach : Fábio Matias
- Assistant coach :
- Fitness coach : Rodrigo Squinalli
- Goalkeeping coach : Alex Lessa
- Physiologist : Marcos Galgaro
- Nutritionist : Juliana Veber
- Assistant Fitness Coach : Antônio Dal Pizzol
- Development analyst : Antônio Macedo, Josué Romero, Luan Garcia
- Club doctor : Michel Vigo, Rodrigo Zampieri, Alexandre Fay, Cristiano Raymondi
- Physiotherapist : Ricardo Finger, Jean Michelon
- Masseurs : Cleber Fernandes, Leonardo Zapello

== See also ==
- Esporte Clube Juventude (women)
