= 2025 Sport Club Internacional season =

Internacional
2025 season
- President: Alessandro Barcellos
- Manager: Roger Machado (until 21 September) Ramón Díaz (from 24 September until 29 November) Abel Braga (from 29 November)
- Stadium: Beira-Rio
- Campeonato Brasileiro Série A: 16th
- Campeonato Gaúcho: Winners
- Copa Libertadores: Round of 16
- Copa do Brasil: Round of 16
- Top goalscorer: League: Alan Patrick (11 goals); All: Alan Patrick (21 goals)
- Average home league attendance: 23,609
Home colours	Away colours	Third colours

The 2025 season was Sport Club Internacional's 115th season in existence. As well as the Campeonato Brasileiro Série A, the club competed in the Copa do Brasil, the Campeonato Gaúcho and the Copa Libertadores.

== First team ==
As of 3 September 2025.

Note: Flags indicate national team as defined under FIFA eligibility rules; some limited exceptions apply. Players may hold more than one non-FIFA nationality.

No.	Pos.	Nation	Player
1	GK	URU	Sergio Rochet
4	DF	BRA	Vitão
7	FW	COL	Johan Carbonero (on loan from Racing)
8	MF	BRA	Bruno Henrique
10	MF	BRA	Alan Patrick (captain)
11	MF	PAR	Óscar Romero
12	GK	BRA	Ivan
13	FW	ECU	Enner Valencia
14	MF	URU	Alan Rodríguez
15	DF	BRA	Bruno Gomes
16	MF	BRA	Ronaldo
17	MF	BRA	Bruno Tabata
18	DF	BRA	Juninho
19	FW	COL	Rafael Santos Borré
20	DF	BRA	Clayton Sampaio

No.	Pos.	Nation	Player
22	GK	BRA	Kauan Jesus
23	DF	PAR	Alan Benítez
24	GK	BRA	Anthoni
25	DF	ARG	Gabriel Mercado (vice-captain)
26	DF	ARG	Alexandro Bernabei
28	FW	BRA	Vitinho (on loan from Dynamo Kyiv)
29	MF	BRA	Thiago Maia
35	DF	ARG	Braian Aguirre
36	MF	BRA	Richard
37	FW	BRA	Yago Noal
39	MF	BRA	Luis Otávio
41	DF	BRA	Victor Gabriel
47	MF	BRA	Gustavo Prado
48	FW	BRA	Raykkonen
49	FW	BRA	Ricardo Mathias

=== Youth players ===
Note: Flags indicate national team as defined under FIFA eligibility rules; some limited exceptions apply. Players may hold more than one non-FIFA nationality.

No.	Pos.	Nation	Player
38	FW	BRA	Marlon
40	DF	BRA	João Dalla Corte
42	DF	BRA	Pablo
43	MF	BRA	Bernardo

No.	Pos.	Nation	Player
46	DF	BRA	Pedro Kauã
50	MF	BRA	Gustavo Santos (on loan from Cuiabá)
—	FW	BRA	Lucca Drummond

=== Transfers Out ===
Pos.	Player	Transferred to	Fee	Date	Source
MF	(Brazil) Matheus Dias	(Portugal) Nacional	Undisclosed	11 July 2025	
DF	(Brazil) Kaique Rocha	(Portugal) Casa Pia	€250k	28 July 2025	

== Competitions ==
=== Overview ===
Competition	First match	Last match	Starting round	Final position	Record							
Competition	First match	Last match	Starting round	Final position	Pld	W	D	L	GF	GA	GD	Win %
Série A	29 March 2025	7 December 2025	Matchday 1	16th	38	11	11	16	44	57	−13	28.95
Campeonato Gaúcho	22 January 2025	16 March 2025	Group stage	Winners	12	9	3	0	24	6	+18	75.00
Copa do Brasil	29 April 2025	6 August 2025	Third round	Round of 16	4	2	1	1	5	2	+3	50.00
Copa Libertadores	3 April 2025	20 August 2025	Group stage	Round of 16	8	3	2	3	12	11	+1	37.50
Total					62	25	17	20	85	76	+9	40.32

Source: Competitions

=== Campeonato Gaúcho ===
==== Group B ====
Pos	Team	Pld	W	D	L	GF	GA	GD	Pts	Qualification or relegation
1	Internacional	8	6	2	0	16	4	+12	20	Knockout stage
2	Caxias	8	4	2	2	8	9	−1	14	Knockout stage
3	Ypiranga	8	3	3	2	6	6	0	12	
4	Pelotas	8	1	3	4	6	13	−7	6	Relegation stage

Source: FGF

==== Matches ====
22 January 2025 1	Guarany de Bagé	2–2	Internacional	Bagé
19:00	Yan Philippe 40', 42'	Report	Alan Patrick 25' (pen.); Victor Gabriel 50'	Stadium: Estrela D'Alva; Attendance: 3,117; Referee: Jonathan Benkenstein Pinheiro

25 January 2025 2	Internacional	2–0	Juventude	Porto Alegre
16:30	Borré 45+9' (pen.), 65'	Report		Stadium: Beira-Rio; Attendance: 21,338; Referee: Rafael Rodrigo Klein

28 January 2025 3	São José	0–2	Internacional	Novo Hamburgo
21:30		Report	Alan Patrick 89' (pen.); Carbonero 90+4'	Stadium: Estádio do Vale; Attendance: 480; Referee: Anderson Daronco

2 February 2025 4	Internacional	1–0	Avenida	Porto Alegre
20:30	Bernabei 62'	Report		Stadium: Beira-Rio; Attendance: 14,323; Referee: Wagner Silveira Echevarria

5 February 2025 5	Internacional	3–0	Brasil (PE)	Porto Alegre
20:00	Rogel 45+6'; Vitinho 48'; Valencia 64'	Report		Stadium: Beira-Rio; Attendance: 12,120; Referee: Roger Goulart

8 February 2025 6	Grêmio	1–1	Internacional	Porto Alegre
21:00	Braithwaite 70' (pen.)	Report	Fernando 72'	Stadium: Arena do Grêmio; Attendance: 45,364; Referee: Rafael Rodrigo Klein

12 February 2025 7	São Luiz	1–3	Internacional	Ijuí
22:00	Rafael Goiano 32'	Report	Vitinho 13'; Valencia 67'; Wanderson 70'	Stadium: 19 de Outubro; Attendance: 2,570; Referee: Jonathan Benkenstein Pinheiro

15 February 2025 8	Internacional	2–0	Monsoon	Porto Alegre
16:30	Bruno Henrique 33'; Marcos Arthur 37' (o.g.)	Report		Stadium: Beira-Rio; Attendance: 18,394; Referee: Roger Goulart

===== Semi-finals =====
22 February 2025 First leg	Caxias	0–2	Internacional	Caxias do Sul
16:30		Report	Vitinho 67', 73'	Stadium: Centenário; Attendance: 9,073; Referee: Jean Pierre Gonçalves Lima

1 March 2025 Second leg	Internacional	3–1 (5–1 agg.)	Caxias	Porto Alegre
21:30	Valencia 57' (pen.), 79'; Vitinho 63'	Report	Tomas Bastos 41' (pen.)	Stadium: Beira-Rio; Attendance: 30,454; Referee: Roger Goulart

===== Finals =====
8 March 2025 First leg	Grêmio	0–2	Internacional	Porto Alegre
17:45		Report	Carbonero 23'; Alan Patrick 26'	Stadium: Arena do Grêmio; Attendance: 51,077; Referee: Ramon Abatti Abel

16 March 2025 Second leg	Internacional	1–1 (3–1 agg.)	Grêmio	Porto Alegre
16:00	Valencia 56'	Report	Wagner Leonardo 62'	Stadium: Beira-Rio; Attendance: 49,295; Referee: Marcelo de Lima Henrique

=== Copa Libertadores ===
==== Group stage ====
Internacional has qualified for the 2025 Libertadores group stage, which was drawn by CONMEBOL on 17 March 2025.

Pos	Team	Pld	W	D	L	GF	GA	GD	Pts	Qualification
1	(Brazil) Internacional	6	3	2	1	12	8	+4	11	Advance to round of 16
2	(Colombia) Atlético Nacional	6	3	0	3	7	6	+1	9	Advance to round of 16
3	(Brazil) Bahia	6	2	1	3	5	7	−2	7	Transfer to Copa Sudamericana
4	(Uruguay) Nacional	6	2	1	3	7	10	−3	7	

Source: CONMEBOL
Rules for classification: 1) Points; 2) Goal difference; 3) Goals scored; 4) Away goals scored; 5) CONMEBOL ranking.

3 April 2025 1	Bahia (Brazil)	1–1	(Brazil) Internacional	Salvador, Brazil
19:00 UTC−3	Jean Lucas 73'	Report	Valencia 84'	Stadium: Arena Fonte Nova; Attendance: 43,028; Referee: Piero Maza (Chile)

10 April 2025 2	Internacional (Brazil)	3–0	(Colombia) Atlético Nacional	Porto Alegre, Brazil
19:00 UTC−3	Alan Patrick 50' (pen.), 82' (pen.), 88'	Report		Stadium: Beira-Rio; Attendance: 42,804; Referee: Felipe González (Chile)

22 April 2025 3	Internacional (Brazil)	3–3	(Uruguay) Nacional	Porto Alegre, Brazil
21:30 UTC−3	Alan Patrick 45+1'; Bernabei 67'; Fernando 73'	Report	Millán 6'; Boggio 10'; Coates 43'	Stadium: Beira-Rio; Attendance: 37,492; Referee: Alexis Herrera (Venezuela)

8 May 2025 4	Atlético Nacional (Colombia)	3–1	(Brazil) Internacional	Medellín, Colombia
21:30 UTC−3	Viveros 39', 90+3'; Billy Arce 55'	Report	Alan Patrick 80' (pen.)	Stadium: Atanasio Girardot; Attendance: 41,006; Referee: Facundo Tello (Argentina)

15 May 2025 5	Nacional (Uruguay)	0–2	(Brazil) Internacional	Montevideo, Uruguay
19:00 UTC−3		Report	Ricardo Mathias 45'; Aguirre 90+7'	Stadium: Gran Parque Central; Attendance: 27,984; Referee: Piero Maza (Chile)

28 May 2025 6	Internacional (Brazil)	2–1	(Brazil) Bahia	Porto Alegre, Brazil
19:00 UTC−3	Vitinho 58'; Borré 77'	Report	Jean Lucas 54'	Stadium: Beira-Rio; Attendance: 33,712; Referee: Facundo Tello (Argentina)

==== Round of 16 ====
The draw for the round of 16 was held on 2 June 2025.

13 August 2025 First leg	Flamengo (Brazil)	1–0	(Brazil) Internacional	Rio de Janeiro, Brazil
21:30 UTC−3	Bruno Henrique 28'	Report		Stadium: Maracanã; Attendance: 68,453; Referee: Darío Herrera (Argentina)

20 August 2025 Second leg	Internacional (Brazil)	0–2 (0–3 agg.)	(Brazil) Flamengo	Porto Alegre, Brazil
21:30 UTC−3		Report	De Arrascaeta 27'; Pedro 88'	Stadium: Beira-Rio; Attendance: 43,581; Referee: Esteban Ostojich (Uruguay)

=== Serie A ===
Pos	Team	Pld	W	D	L	GF	GA	GD	Pts	Qualification or relegation
14	Vasco da Gama	38	13	6	19	55	60	−5	45	Qualification for Copa Sudamericana group stage
15	Vitória	38	11	12	15	35	52	−17	45	
16	Internacional	38	11	11	16	44	57	−13	44	
17	Ceará (R)	38	11	10	17	34	40	−6	43	Relegation to Campeonato Brasileiro Série B
18	Fortaleza (R)	38	11	10	17	44	58	−14	43	Relegation to Campeonato Brasileiro Série B

Source: CBF
Rules for classification: 1) points; 2) wins; 3) goal difference; 4) goals scored; 5) head-to-head results (only between two teams); 6) fewest red cards; 7) fewest yellow cards; 8) drawing of lots.
(R) Relegated

==== Results summary ====
Overall								Home						Away					
Pld	W	D	L	GF	GA	GD	Pts	W	D	L	GF	GA	GD	W	D	L	GF	GA	GD
38	11	11	16	44	57	−13	44	8	6	5	27	20	+7	3	5	11	17	37	−20

==== Matches ====
The league fixtures was announced on 12 February 2025.

29 March 2025 1	Flamengo	1–1	Internacional	Rio de Janeiro
21:00	Léo Pereira 54'	Report	Bruno Henrique 34'	Stadium: Maracanã; Attendance: 48,452; Referee: Davi de Oliveira Lacerda

6 April 2025 2	Internacional	3–0	Cruzeiro	Porto Alegre
18:30	Alan Patrick 31'; Valencia 33'; Borré 77'	Report		Stadium: Beira-Rio; Attendance: 31,321; Referee: Marcelo de Lima Henrique

13 April 2025 3	Fortaleza	0–0	Internacional	Fortaleza
20:00		Report		Stadium: Arena Castelão; Attendance: 16,587; Referee: Flávio Rodrigues de Souza

16 April 2025 4	Internacional	0–1	Palmeiras	Porto Alegre
19:30		Report	Facundo Torres 64'	Stadium: Beira-Rio; Attendance: 30,665; Referee: Felipe Fernandes de Lima

19 April 2025 5	Grêmio	1–1	Internacional	Porto Alegre
21:00	Anthoni 38' (o.g.)	Report	Alan Patrick 66' (pen.)	Stadium: Arena do Grêmio; Attendance: 27,286; Referee: Bráulio da Silva Machado

26 April 2025 6	Internacional	3–1	Juventude	Porto Alegre
16:00	Victor Gabriel 18', 39'; Borré 61'	Report	Batalla 4'	Stadium: Beira-Rio; Attendance: 35,427; Referee: Flávio Rodrigues de Souza

3 May 2025 7	Corinthians	4–2	Internacional	São Paulo
18:30	Yuri Alberto 25', 64', 90+4' (pen.); Coronado 90+13'	Report	Aguirre 38'; Thiago Maia 42'	Stadium: Neo Química Arena; Attendance: 44,910; Referee: Paulo César Zanovelli da Silva

11 May 2025 8	Botafogo	4–0	Internacional	Rio de Janeiro
20:00	Igor Jesus 9'; Artur 44'; Cuiabano 54'; Alex Telles 69'	Report		Stadium: Nilton Santos; Attendance: 7,800; Referee: Matheus Delgado Candançan

18 May 2025 9	Internacional	1–1	Mirassol	Porto Alegre
20:30	Ricardo Mathias 77'	Report	Jemmes 8'	Stadium: Beira-Rio; Attendance: 12,150; Referee: Wagner do Nascimento Magalhães

25 May 2025 10	Sport	1–1	Internacional	Recife
16:00	Barletta 7'	Report	Gustavo Prado 48'	Stadium: Ilha do Retiro; Attendance: 21,921; Referee: Davi de Oliveira Lacerda

1 June 2025 11	Internacional	0–2	Fluminense	Porto Alegre
20:30		Report	Serna 11'; Paulo Baya 83'	Stadium: Beira-Rio; Attendance: 13,502; Referee: Lucas Paulo Torezin

12 June 2025 12	Atlético Mineiro	2–0	Internacional	Belo Horizonte
21:30	Vitão 30' (o.g.); Júnior Santos 90+4'	Report		Stadium: Arena MRV; Attendance: 24,781; Referee: Flávio Rodrigues de Souza

12 July 2025 13	Internacional	1–0	Vitória	Porto Alegre
16:30	Bruno Tabata 90+2'	Report		Stadium: Beira-Rio; Attendance: 22,263; Referee: Rodrigo José Pereira de Lima

20 July 2025 15	Internacional	1–0	Ceará	Porto Alegre
11:00	Alan Patrick 23'	Report		Stadium: Beira-Rio; Attendance: 31,976; Referee: Davi de Oliveira Lacerda

23 July 2025 16	Santos	1–2	Internacional	Santos
21:30	Barreal 90+1'	Report	Carbonero 9'; Borré 75' (pen.)	Stadium: Vila Belmiro; Attendance: 11,686; Referee: Lucas Paulo Torezin

27 July 2025 17	Internacional	1–1	Vasco	Porto Alegre
18:30	Carbonero 90+1'	Report	Rayan 30'	Stadium: Beira-Rio; Attendance: 13,188; Referee: Flávio Rodrigues de Souza

3 August 2025 18	Internacional	1–2	São Paulo	Porto Alegre
20:30	Bruno Tabata 89' (pen.)	Report	Arboleda 43'; Bobadilla 76'	Stadium: Beira-Rio; Attendance: 11,414; Referee: Alex Gomes Stefano

9 August 2025 19	Red Bull Bragantino	1–3	Internacional	Bragança Paulista
18:30	Pitta 55'	Report	Ricardo Mathias 7', 46'; Alan Patrick 33' (pen.)	Stadium: Cícero de Souza Marques; Attendance: 3,197; Referee: Felipe Fernandes de Lima

17 August 2025 20	Internacional	1–3	Flamengo	Porto Alegre
18:30	Borré 90+2'	Report	Pedro 7', 12'; Plata 62'	Stadium: Beira-Rio; Attendance: 23,224; Referee: Rodrigo José Pereira de Lima

23 August 2025 21	Cruzeiro	2–1	Internacional	Belo Horizonte
18:30	Matheus Pereira 19'; Kaio Jorge 58'	Report	Bruno Tabata 24'	Stadium: Mineirão; Attendance: 44,402; Referee: Matheus Delgado Candançan

31 August 2025 22	Internacional	2–1	Fortaleza	Porto Alegre
20:30	Alan Patrick 24' (pen.); Vitinho 51'	Report	Lucca Prior 31'	Stadium: Beira-Rio; Attendance: 9,099; Referee: João Vitor Gobi

13 September 2025 23	Palmeiras	4–1	Internacional	São Paulo
18:30	Vitor Roque 4', 24', 43'; Lucas Evangelista 29'	Report	Carbonero 72'	Stadium: Allianz Parque; Attendance: 39,640; Referee: Lucas Paulo Torezin

21 September 2025 24	Internacional	2–3	Grêmio	Porto Alegre
17:30	Alan Patrick 21' (pen.), 45+6' (pen.)	Report	Carlos Vinícius 29'; André 45+8'; Alysson 62'	Stadium: Beira-Rio; Attendance: 28,176; Referee: Marcelo de Lima Henrique

27 September 2025 25	Juventude	1–1	Internacional	Caxias do Sul
18:30	Ênio 63'	Report	Alan Patrick 24'	Stadium: Alfredo Jaconi; Attendance: 8,178; Referee: Matheus Delgado Candançan

1 October 2025 26	Internacional	1–1	Corinthians	Porto Alegre
19:30	Carbonero 90+12'	Report	Gui Negão 10'	Stadium: Beira-Rio; Attendance: 12,825; Referee: Rodrigo José Pereira de Lima

4 October 2025 27	Internacional	2–0	Botafogo	Porto Alegre
18:30	Alan Patrick 9'; Vitinho 50'	Report		Stadium: Beira-Rio; Attendance: 20,805; Referee: Flávio Rodrigues de Souza

15 October 2025 28	Mirassol	3–1	Internacional	Mirassol
20:00	Neto Moura 26'; Reinaldo 45+4'; Negueba 49'	Report	Thiago Maia 38'	Stadium: José Maria de Campos Maia; Attendance: 5,072; Referee: Bruno Arleu de Araújo

19 October 2025 29	Internacional	2–0	Sport	Porto Alegre
18:30	Borré 24'; Bruno Henrique 68'	Report		Stadium: Beira-Rio; Attendance: 20,781; Referee: Lucas Paulo Torezin

22 October 2025 14	Bahia	1–0	Internacional	Salvador
19:00	Willian José 45+6'	Report		Stadium: Arena Fonte Nova; Attendance: 27,452; Referee: Flávio Rodrigues de Souza

25 October 2025 30	Fluminense	1–0	Internacional	Rio de Janeiro
17:30	Samuel Xavier 61'	Report		Stadium: Maracanã; Attendance: 21,298; Referee: Raphael Claus

2 November 2025 31	Internacional	0–0	Atlético Mineiro	Porto Alegre
18:30		Report		Stadium: Beira-Rio; Attendance: 32,644; Referee: Alex Gomes Stefano

5 November 2025 32	Vitória	1–0	Internacional	Salvador
19:00	Lucas Halter 68'	Report		Stadium: Barradão; Attendance: 21,725; Referee: Felipe Fernandes de Lima

8 November 2025 33	Internacional	2–2	Bahia	Porto Alegre
18:30	Vitinho 25', 49'	Report	Willian José 60'; Tiago 90+4'	Stadium: Beira-Rio; Attendance: 18,524; Referee: Lucas Paulo Torezin

20 November 2025 34	Ceará	1–2	Internacional	Fortaleza
21:30	Ricardo Mathias 80' (o.g.)	Report	Vitinho 76'; Ricardo Mathias 87'	Stadium: Arena Castelão; Attendance: 46,036; Referee: Rodrigo José Pereira de Lima

24 November 2025 35	Internacional	1–1	Santos	Porto Alegre
21:00	Alan Patrick 20'	Report	Barreal 62'	Stadium: Beira-Rio; Attendance: 37,429; Referee: Davi de Oliveira Lacerda

28 November 2025 36	Vasco	5–1	Internacional	Rio de Janeiro
19:30	Andrés Gómez 2'; Rayan 9', 47'; Cauan Barros 58'; Nuno Moreira 66'	Report	Ricardo Mathias 45+2'	Stadium: São Januário; Attendance: 19,330; Referee: Rodrigo José Pereira de Lima

3 December 2025 37	São Paulo	3–0	Internacional	Santos
20:00	Sabino 21'; Maik 45+3'; Luciano 48'	Report		Stadium: Vila Belmiro; Attendance: 7,309; Referee: Bruno Arleu de Araújo

7 December 2025 38	Internacional	3–1	Red Bull Bragantino	Porto Alegre
16:00	Mercado 50'; Alan Patrick 77' (pen.); Carbonero 81'	Report	Jhon Jhon 87'	Stadium: Beira-Rio; Attendance: 21,710; Referee: Davi de Oliveira Lacerda

=== Copa do Brasil ===
==== Third round ====
29 April 2025 First leg	Internacional	1–0	Maracanã	Porto Alegre
19:00 UTC−3	Gustavo Prado 90+3'	Report		Stadium: Beira-Rio; Attendance: 16,145; Referee: Bruno Pereira Vasconcelos

22 May 2025 Second leg	Maracanã	0–3 (0–4 agg.)	Internacional	Florianópolis
19:00 UTC−3		Report	Alan Patrick 50'; Wesley 73'; Romero 86'	Stadium: Orlando Scarpelli; Attendance: 12,265; Referee: Edina Alves Batista

==== Round of 16 ====
30 July 2025 First leg	Internacional	1–2	Fluminense	Porto Alegre
21:30 UTC−3	Carbonero 35'	Report	Everaldo 9', 40'	Stadium: Beira-Rio; Attendance: 33,801; Referee: Rodrigo José Pereira de Lima

6 August 2025 Second leg	Fluminense	1–1 (3–2 agg.)	Internacional	Rio de Janeiro
21:30 UTC−3	Canobbio 46'	Report	Alan Patrick 65' (pen.)	Stadium: Maracanã; Attendance: 32,368; Referee: Ramon Abatti Abel
