= 2024 Sport Club Internacional season =

Internacional
2024 season
- President: Alessandro Barcellos
- Manager: Eduardo Coudet (until 10 July) Pablo Fernandez (interim) Roger Machado (since 18 July)
- Stadium: Beira-Rio
- Campeonato Brasileiro Série A: 5th
- Campeonato Gaúcho: Semi-finals
- Copa Sudamericana: Knockout round play-offs
- Copa do Brasil: Third round
- Top goalscorer: League: Wesley (11); All: Wesley (13)
- Highest home attendance: 48,049 - Internacional 1-0 Grêmio, Série A MD 31
- Lowest home attendance: 0* - Internacional 1-0 Avenida, Campeonato Gaúcho MD1; *Behind closed gates
- Average home league attendance: 27,505
- Biggest win: 4–1 vs RB Bragantino; Série A - Matchday 35
- Biggest defeat: 0–3 vs Fortaleza; Série A - Matchday 38
Home colours	Away colours	Third colours

The 2024 season was Sport Club Internacional's 114th season in existence. Along with the Campeonato Brasileiro Série A, the club competed in the Copa do Brasil, the Campeonato Gaúcho, and the Copa Sudamericana.

== First team ==
As of 2 September 2024.

Note: Flags indicate national team as defined under FIFA eligibility rules; some limited exceptions apply. Players may hold more than one non-FIFA nationality.

No.	Pos.	Nation	Player
1	GK	URU	Sergio Rochet
5	MF	BRA	Fernando
6	DF	BRA	Renê
7	MF	BRA	Hyoran
8	MF	BRA	Bruno Henrique
10	MF	BRA	Alan Patrick (captain)
11	FW	BEL	Wanderson
12	GK	BRA	Fabrício
13	FW	ECU	Enner Valencia
15	MF	BRA	Bruno Gomes
17	MF	BRA	Bruno Tabata
18	DF	URU	Agustín Rogel (on loan from Hertha)
19	FW	COL	Rafael Santos Borré
20	DF	BRA	Clayton Sampaio
21	FW	BRA	Wesley

No.	Pos.	Nation	Player
22	GK	BRA	Ivan
23	DF	BRA	Nathan Santos (on loan from Santos)
24	GK	BRA	Anthoni
25	DF	ARG	Gabriel Mercado (vice-captain)
26	DF	ARG	Alexandro Bernabei (on loan from Celtic)
29	MF	BRA	Thiago Maia
31	FW	ARG	Lucas Alario
34	MF	BRA	Gabriel Carvalho
35	DF	ARG	Braian Aguirre
40	MF	BRA	Rômulo
44	DF	BRA	Vitão
45	FW	BRA	Lucca
47	MF	BRA	Gustavo Prado

=== Youth players ===
Note: Flags indicate national team as defined under FIFA eligibility rules; some limited exceptions apply. Players may hold more than one non-FIFA nationality.

No.	Pos.	Nation	Player
22	GK	BRA	Kauan Jesus
37	FW	BRA	Yago
39	MF	BRA	Luis Otávio
42	DF	BRA	Evertow

No.	Pos.	Nation	Player
43	GK	BRA	Diego
48	FW	BRA	Lucca Drummond
49	FW	BRA	Ricardo Mathias
50	DF	BRA	João Dalla Corte

== Background ==
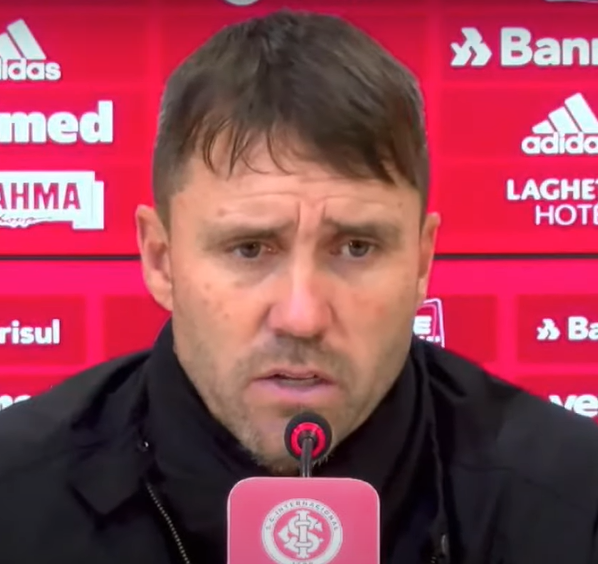
Coach Eduardo Coudet was given a new contract ending Dec 2024

Internacional started 2024 by extending coach Eduardo Coudet's contract (as well as his coaching staff) for another year, given the team's relative success under the Argentinian after reaching the Copa Libertadores semifinals and ending the Brasileirão Série A with a positive note. After a frustrating year in 2023, president Alessandro Barcelos promised to build a stronger team for the season.

As the squad managed returned for the pre-season, the squad was greeted by the arrival of new signings such as defenders Robert Renan and Alexandro Bernabei, striker Lucas Alario, wingers Wesley and Hyoran, and goalkeeper Ivan Quaresma, as well as the club exercising the buying option for defensive midfielder Rômulo. These would be strengthened by the arrivals of veteran Fernando Reges, midfielder Thiago Maia, and striker Rafael Santos Borré, a transfer very celebrated by fans, later in the first months of the year.

Additionally, the club managed to move players like goalkeeper Keiller, wingers David, Jean Dias, and Pedro Henrique, striker Luiz Adriano, defender Nico Hernández, among other first-team members that would not be getting further chances in 2024.

== Transfers ==
=== In ===
Date	Pos.	No.	Player	From	Fee	Ref.
07 January 2024	GK	22	(Brazil) Ivan Quaresma	(Brazil) Corinthians	€ 280,000	
08 January 2024	MF	13	(Brazil) Hyoran	(Brazil) Atlético-MG	Free transfer	
11 January 2024	FW	31	(Argentina) Lucas Alario	(Germany) Eintracht Frankfurt	€ 500,000	
14 January 2024	MF	40	(Brazil) Rômulo (Note: The club exercised its buying option to sign the player on a permanent deal after a successful loan in the 2023 season.)	(Brazil) Athletic Club	€ 565,000	
16 February 2024	FW	21	(Brazil) Wesley (Note: Acquired 50% of the player's rights from Cruzeiro - the remaining 50% kept with Palmeiras)	(Brazil) Cruzeiro	€ 2,000,000	
16 February 2024	DF	22	(Brazil) Bruno Gomes	(Brazil) Coritiba	€ 1,300,000	
21 February 2024	MF	5	(Brazil) Fernando (Note: Fernando agreed to sign for Inter months earlier before joining his youth club Vila Nova in Goiás. Club and player managed to sign a new deal afterward, when he decided to leave his home state.)	(Brazil) Vila Nova	Free Transfer	
05 March 2024	FW	19	(Colombia) Rafael Borré (Note: Internacional had to negotiate the player's early release as he's been loaned out to Werder Bremen at the time.)	(Germany) Eintracht Frankfurt	€ 6,500,000	
07 March 2024	MF	29	(Brazil) Thiago Maia (Note: Inter and Flamengo negotiated a season loan with a mandatory buy by the end of 2024. In September, the Colorado anticipated a permanent deal for the player.)	(Brazil) Flamengo	€ 4,000,000	
08 April 2024	GK	12	(Brazil) Fabrício	(Brazil) Nova Iguaçu	Free Transfer	
01 July 2024	DF	44	(Brazil) Vitão (Note: Vitão signed a permanent deal in 2024 after a two-year loan spell at Internacional. He's been given permit to leave Ukraine due to the ongoing Russia-Ukraine War.)	(Ukraine) Shakhtar Donetsk	Free transfer	
11 August 2024	MF	17	(Brazil) Bruno Tabata	(Brazil) Palmeiras	€ 2,200,000	
30 August 2024	DF	20	(Brazil) Clayton Sampaio	(Portugal) AVS	€ 1,200,000	
02 September 2024	DF	35	(Argentina) Braian Aguirre	(Argentina) Lanús	€ 1,270,000	

=== Out ===
Date	Pos.	No.	Player	To	Fee	Ref.
01 January 2024	MF	30	(United States) Johnny	(Spain) Real Betis	€ 6,000,000	
01 January 2024	FW	38	(Brazil) Jean Dias	(Brazil) Paysandu	Released/Free Transfer	
01 January 2024	DF	4	(Brazil) Rodrigo Moledo	Free Agent	Released/Free Transfer	
12 January 2024	DF	22	(Colombia) Nico Hernández	(Argentina) San Lorenzo	Released/Free Transfer	
17 January 2024	DF	-	(Brazil) Heitor	(Brazil) Guarani	Released/Free Transfer	
16 February 2024	FW	28	(Brazil) Pedro Henrique	(Brazil) Corinthians	€ 1,100,000	
05 March 2024	FW	9	(Brazil) Luiz Adriano	(Brazil) Vitória	Released/Free Transfer	
19 March 2024	FW	-	(Brazil) João Peglow	(Poland) Radomiak	Released/Free Transfer	
11 April 2024	MF	14	(Uruguay) Carlos de Pena	(Brazil) Bahia	Released/Free Transfer	
01 July 2024	DF	2	(Spain) Hugo Mallo	Free Agent	End of Contract	
10 July 2024	MF	27	(Brazil) Maurício	(Brazil) Palmeiras	€ 10,500,000	
17 July 2024	DF	36	(Brazil) Thauan Lara (Note: The player had been loaned to Fortaleza for the 2024 season; the deal was terminated for disciplinary reasons.)	(Portugal) Alverca	Undisclosed (Note: Club retained a share of the player's rights for a future transfer)	
05 August 2024	MF	20	(Chile) Charles Aránguiz	U. de Chile	Released/Free Transfer	
09 August 2024	DF	16	(Argentina) Fabricio Bustos	(Argentina) River Plate	€ 4,100,000	
20 August 2024	FW	-	(Brazil) Matheus Cadorini	(Spain) Real Murcia	Released/Free Transfer	
02 September 2024	DF	-	(Brazil) Paulo Victor	(Portugal) Farense	Released/Free Transfer	
30 September 2024	DF	3	(Brazil) Igor Gomes	(United Arab Emirates) Shabab Al-Ahli	€ 4,500,000	

=== Loans in ===
Date	Pos.	No.	Player	From	Until	Ref.
11 January 2024	DF	4	(Brazil) Robert Renan	(Russia) Zenit	31 December 2024 (Note: Player had its loan terminated in September. He was then loaned out once again, this time to Al-Shabab FC in Saudi Arabia.)	
07 March 2024	DF	26	(Argentina) Alexandro Bernabei	(Scotland) Celtic	31 December 2024	
07 August 2024	DF	31	(Uruguay) Agustín Rogel	(Germany) Hertha BSC	30 June 2025	
27 August 2024	DF	23	(Brazil) Nathan Santos	(Brazil) Santos	30 June 2025	

=== Loans Out ===
Date	Pos.	No.	Player	To	Until	Ref.
01 January 2024	MF	-	(Brazil) Estêvão	(Brazil) Vila Nova	30 June 2024	
01 January 2024	GK	-	(Brazil) Emerson Júnior	(Brazil) Atlético-GO	31 December 2024	
11 January 2024	FW	17	(Brazil) David (Note: Loan had a mandatory buy option should he play at least 60% of Vasco's matches during the season. Clause was activated by 20 September 2024.)	(Brazil) Vasco da Gama	31 December 2024	
01 February 2024	MF	-	(Brazil) Lucas Ramos	(Latvia) Auda	31 December 2024	
05 February 2024	GK	1	(Brazil) Keiller	(Brazil) Vasco da Gama	31 December 2024	
06 March 2024	MF	17	(Brazil) Campanharo	(Brazil) Atlético-GO	31 December 2024	
19 April 2024	MF	23	(Brazil) Gabriel	(Brazil) Athletico-PR	31 December 2024	
29 July 2024	FW	42	(Brazil) Gabriel Barros	(Brazil) Avaí	31 December 2024	
01 August 2024	MF	41	(Brazil) Matheus Dias	(Portugal) Nacional da Madeira	30 June 2025	
16 August 2024	MF	-	(Brazil) Estêvão	(Brazil) Guarani	31 December 2024	

== Competitions ==
=== Overview ===
Competition	First match	Last match	Starting round	Final position	Record							
Competition	First match	Last match	Starting round	Final position	Pld	W	D	L	GF	GA	GD	Win %
Série A	13 April 2024	8 December 2024	Matchday 1	5th	38	18	11	9	53	36	+17	47.37
Campeonato Gaúcho	21 January 2024	25 March 2024	Matchday 1	Semi-finals	14	10	3	1	25	8	+17	71.43
Copa do Brasil	28 February 2024	13 July 2024	First round	Third round	4	2	1	1	6	3	+3	50.00
Copa Sudamericana	2 April 2024	23 July 2024	Group stage	Knockout round play-offs	8	3	3	2	7	5	+2	37.50
Total					64	33	18	13	91	52	+39	51.56

Source: Competitions

=== Campeonato Gaúcho ===
==== League table ====
Pos	Team	Pld	W	D	L	GF	GA	GD	Pts	Qualification or relegation
1	Internacional	11	9	1	1	21	7	+14	28	Qualification to Knockout stage
2	Grêmio	11	7	2	2	23	10	+13	23	Qualification to Knockout stage
3	Caxias	11	4	4	3	15	14	+1	16	Qualification to Knockout stage
4	Guarany de Bagé	11	4	4	3	12	15	−3	16	Qualification to Knockout stage
5	Juventude	11	4	3	4	15	9	+6	15	Qualification to Knockout stage

Source: Soccerway
Rules for classification: 1) Points; 2) Wins; 3) Goal difference; 4) Goals scored; 5) fewest red cards; 6) fewest yellow cards; 7) Draw in the headquarters of the FGF.

==== Matches ====
21 January 2024 1	Internacional	1–0	Avenida	Porto Alegre
16:00	Wanderson 70'	Report		Stadium: Beira-Rio; Attendance: 0 Referee: Jonathan Benkenstein Pinheiro

24 January 2024 2	São Luiz	0–0	Internacional	Ijuí
19:00		Report		Stadium: 19 de Outubro; Attendance: 2,831; Referee: Anderson Daronco

27 January 2024 3	Internacional	3–0	Ypiranga	Porto Alegre
16:30	Alan Patrick 16'; Wanderson 44'; Aránguiz 81'	Report		Stadium: Beira-Rio; Attendance: 12,490; Referee: Erico Andrade de Carvalho

31 January 2024 4	Guarany de Bagé	2–1	Internacional	Bagé
18:30	Tony Junior 11'; Micael 23'	Report	Pedro Henrique 33' (pen.)	Stadium: Estrela D'Alva; Attendance: 2,662; Referee: Rafael Rodrigo Klein

3 February 2024 5	Internacional	2–0	Caxias	Porto Alegre
16:30	Lucca 53', 61'	Report		Stadium: Beira-Rio; Attendance: 14,726; Referee: Jean Pierre Gonçalves Lima

7 February 2024 6	Santa Cruz	0–2	Internacional	Santa Cruz do Sul
21:30		Report	Bruno Henrique 10'; Valencia 41'	Stadium: Plátanos; Attendance: 1,553; Referee: Anderson Daronco

11 February 2024 7	São José	0–1	Internacional	Porto Alegre
19:00		Report	de Pena 66'	Stadium: Passo D'Areia; Attendance: 853; Referee: Roger Goulart

14 February 2024 8	Internacional	3–1	Brasil (PE)	Porto Alegre
21:30	Gabriel Biteco 9' (o.g.); Valencia 17'; Alario 37'	Report	Marcinho 85'	Stadium: Beira-Rio; Attendance: 21,187; Referee: Jonathan Benkenstein Pinheiro

18 February 2024 9	Novo Hamburgo	1–3	Internacional	Novo Hamburgo
20:00	Luam Parede 11'	Report	Alan Patrick 28'; Valencia 44'; Wanderson 56'	Stadium: Estádio do Vale; Attendance: 1,362; Referee: Francisco Soares Dias

25 February 2024 10	Internacional	3–2	Grêmio	Porto Alegre
18:00	Maurício 26'; Alario 64'; Alan Patrick 90+8' (pen.)	Report	Renê 15' (o.g.); Villasanti 56'	Stadium: Beira-Rio; Attendance: 47,197; Referee: Anderson Daronco

2 March 2024 11	Juventude	1–2	Internacional	Caxias do Sul
16:30	Vitão 52' (o.g.)	Report	Hyoran 23'; Wesley 46'	Stadium: Alfredo Jaconi; Attendance: 8,024; Referee: Daniel Nobre Bins

==== Knockout stage ====
===== Quarter-finals =====
9 March 2024 Single match	Internacional	3–0	São Luiz	Porto Alegre
16:30	Valencia 5'; Igor Gomes 17'; Maurício 84'	Report		Stadium: Beira-Rio; Attendance: 41,690; Referee: Francisco Soares Dias

===== Semi-finals =====
17 March 2024 First leg	Juventude	0–0	Internacional	Caxias do Sul
16:00		Report		Stadium: Alfredo Jaconi; Attendance: 12,306; Referee: Lucas Guimarães Rechatiko Horn

25 March 2024 Second leg	Internacional	1–1 (1–1 agg.) (5–6 p)	Juventude	Porto Alegre
21:45	Renê 55'	Report	Zé Marcos 31'	Stadium: Beira-Rio; Attendance: 45,199; Referee: Anderson Daronco
	Penalties
	Alan Patrick (penalty scored); Renê (penalty scored); Mercado (penalty missed); Wanderson (penalty scored); Valencia (penalty scored); Bruno Gomes (penalty scored); Robert Renan (penalty missed)		Gilberto (penalty scored); Alan Ruschel (penalty missed); Rildo (penalty scored); Jadson (penalty scored); Nenê (penalty scored); Kleiton (penalty scored); Kelvi (penalty scored)

=== Copa Sudamericana ===
Internacional has qualified for the 2024 Sudamericana group stage, which was drawn by CONMEBOL on 18 March 2024.

Pos	Team	Pld	W	D	L	GF	GA	GD	Pts	Qualification	BEL	INT	DEL	RTO
1	(Argentina) Belgrano	6	3	3	0	7	3	+4	12	Advance to round of 16	—	0–0	1–1	1–0
2	(Brazil) Internacional	6	3	2	1	6	3	+3	11	Advance to knockout round play-offs	1–2	—	1–0	0–0
3	(Ecuador) Delfín	6	2	2	2	9	8	+1	8		1–1	1–2	—	4–3
4	(Bolivia) Real Tomayapo	6	0	1	5	3	11	−8	1		0–2	0–2	0–2	—

Source: CONMEBOL
Rules for classification: 1) Points; 2) Goal difference; 3) Goals scored; 4) Away goals scored; 5) CONMEBOL ranking.

2 April 2024 1	Belgrano (Argentina)	0–0	(Brazil) Internacional	Córdoba, Argentina
19:00 UTC−3		Report		Stadium: El Gigante de Alberdi; Attendance: 32,756; Referee: Kevin Ortega (Peru)

10 April 2024 2	Internacional (Brazil)	0–0	(Bolivia) Real Tomayapo	Porto Alegre, Brazil
21:00 UTC−3		Report		Stadium: Beira-Rio; Attendance: 24,115; Referee: Christian Ferreyra (Uruguay)

25 April 2024 3	Delfín (Ecuador)	1–2	(Brazil) Internacional	Manta, Ecuador
23:00 UTC−3	Castro 53'	Report	Wesley 35'; Borré 52' (pen.)	Stadium: Jocay; Attendance: 8,524; Referee: Michael Espinoza (Peru)

28 May 2024 6	Internacional (Brazil)	1–2	(Argentina) Belgrano	Barueri, Brazil
21:30 UTC−3	Borré 39'	Report	Chavarría 45', 45+3'	Stadium: Arena Barueri; Attendance: 6,151; Referee: Alexis Herrera (Venezuela)

4 June 2024 4	Real Tomayapo (Bolivia)	0–2	(Brazil) Internacional	Tarija, Bolivia
21:30 UTC−3		Report	Bruno Gomes 31'; Alario 89'	Stadium: IV Centenario; Attendance: 5,872; Referee: Mathías de Armas (Uruguay)

8 June 2024 5	Internacional (Brazil)	1–0	(Ecuador) Delfín	Caxias do Sul, Brazil
21:30 UTC−3	Alario 68'			Stadium: Alfredo Jaconi; Attendance: 16,822; Referee: Felipe González (Chile)

==== Knockout round play-offs ====
The draw for the knockout round play-offs was held on 3 June 2024.

16 July 2024 First leg	Rosario Central (Argentina)	1–0	(Brazil) Internacional	Rosario, Argentina
21:30 UTC−3	Campaz 49'	Report		Stadium: Gigante de Arroyito; Attendance: 21,907; Referee: Cristian Garay (Chile)

23 July 2024 Second leg	Internacional (Brazil)	1–1 (1–2 agg.)	(Argentina) Rosario Central	Porto Alegre, Brazil
21:30 UTC−3	Alan Patrick 49'	Report	Sández 20'	Stadium: Beira-Rio; Attendance: 31,646; Referee: Gustavo Tejera (Uruguay)

=== Serie A ===
Pos	Team	Pld	W	D	L	GF	GA	GD	Pts	Qualification or relegation
3	Flamengo	38	20	10	8	61	42	+19	70	Qualification for Copa Libertadores group stage (Note: Botafogo and Flamengo qualified for the Copa Libertadores group stage by winning the 2024 Copa Libertadores and the 2024 Copa do Brasil, respectively.)
4	Fortaleza	38	19	11	8	53	39	+14	68	Qualification for Copa Libertadores group stage
5	Internacional	38	18	11	9	53	36	+17	65	Qualification for Copa Libertadores group stage
6	São Paulo	38	17	8	13	53	43	+10	59	Qualification for Copa Libertadores group stage
7	Corinthians	38	15	11	12	54	45	+9	56	Qualification for Copa Libertadores second stage

Source: CBF
Rules for classification: 1) points; 2) wins; 3) goal difference; 4) goals scored; 5) head-to-head results (only between two teams); 6) fewest red cards; 7) fewest yellow cards; 8) drawing of lots.

==== Results summary ====
Overall								Home						Away					
Pld	W	D	L	GF	GA	GD	Pts	W	D	L	GF	GA	GD	W	D	L	GF	GA	GD
38	18	11	9	53	36	+17	65	11	5	3	30	15	+15	7	6	6	23	21	+2

==== Matches ====
The league fixtures were announced on 29 February 2024.

13 April 2024 1	Internacional	2–1	Bahia	Porto Alegre
18:30	Wesley 72'; Fernando 83'	Report	Gabriel Teixeira 70'	Stadium: Beira-Rio; Attendance: 22,045; Referee: Rodrigo José Pereira de Lima

17 April 2024 2	Palmeiras	0–1	Internacional	Barueri
20:00		Report	Wesley 45'	Stadium: Arena Barueri; Attendance: 13,464; Referee: Lucas Paulo Torezin

21 April 2024 3	Athletico Paranaense	1–0	Internacional	Curitiba
16:00	Canobbio 71'	Report		Stadium: Ligga Arena; Attendance: 29,784; Referee: Felipe Fernandes de Lima

28 April 2024 4	Internacional	1–1	Atlético Goianiense	Porto Alegre
20:00	Borré 55'	Report	Derek 50'	Stadium: Beira-Rio; Attendance: 23,836; Referee: Edina Alves Batista

1 June 2024 7	Cuiabá	0–1	Internacional	Cuiabá
18:30		Report	Mallo 69'	Stadium: Arena Pantanal; Attendance: 5,747; Referee: Anderson Ribeiro Gonçalves

13 June 2024 8	Internacional	0–0	São Paulo	Criciúma
20:00		Report		Stadium: Heriberto Hülse; Attendance: 17,987; Referee: Bráulio da Silva Machado

16 June 2024 9	Vitória	2–1	Internacional	Salvador
16:00	Willian Oliveira 8'; Wagner Leonardo 90+12' (pen.)	Report	Wesley 82'	Stadium: Barradão; Attendance: 14,251; Referee: Bruno Arleu de Araújo

19 June 2024 10	Internacional	1–0	Corinthians	Florianópolis
21:30	Wesley 42'	Report		Stadium: Orlando Scarpelli; Attendance: 14,447; Referee: Wagner do Nascimento Magalhães

22 June 2024 11	Grêmio	0–1	Internacional	Curitiba
17:30		Report	Gustavo Martins 64' (o.g.)	Stadium: Couto Pereira; Attendance: 27,961; Referee: Ramon Abatti Abel

26 June 2024 12	Internacional	1–2	Atlético Mineiro	Criciúma
21:30	Alan Patrick 67'	Report	Igor Rabello 53'; Rômulo 90+7'	Stadium: Heriberto Hülse; Attendance: 7,791; Referee: Luiz Flávio de Oliveira

30 June 2024 13	Criciúma	1–1	Internacional	Criciúma
18:30	Claudinho 79'	Report	Bruno Henrique 40'	Stadium: Heriberto Hülse; Attendance: 15,859; Referee: Wagner do Nascimento Magalhães

4 July 2024 14	Fluminense	1–1	Internacional	Rio de Janeiro
20:00	Ganso 45+4'	Report	Igor Gomes 40'	Stadium: Maracanã; Attendance: 40,337; Referee: Felipe Fernandes de Lima

7 July 2024 15	Internacional	1–2	Vasco	Porto Alegre
18:00	Bustos 80'	Report	Adson 61'; Lyncon 72'	Stadium: Beira-Rio; Attendance: 33,791; Referee: Gustavo Ervino Bauermann

20 July 2024 18	Botafogo	1–0	Internacional	Rio de Janeiro
18:30	Luiz Henrique 38'	Report		Stadium: Nilton Santos; Attendance: 31,344; Referee: Flávio Rodrigues de Souza

27 July 2024 20	Bahia	1–1	Internacional	Salvador
20:00	David Duarte 13'	Report	Borré 89'	Stadium: Arena Fonte Nova; Attendance: 33,237; Referee: Matheus Delgado Candançan

4 August 2024 21	Internacional	1–1	Palmeiras	Porto Alegre
17:00	Bruno Henrique 31'	Report	Rony 88'	Stadium: Beira-Rio; Attendance: 20,794; Referee: Wagner do Nascimento Magalhães

11 August 2024 22	Internacional	2–2	Athletico Paranaense	Porto Alegre
19:00	Wesley 12'; Wanderson 90+6'	Report	João Cruz 39'; Canobbio 50'	Stadium: Beira-Rio; Attendance: 17,136; Referee: Paulo César Zanovelli da Silva

14 August 2024 6	Internacional	2–1	Juventude	Porto Alegre
19:30	Thiago Maia 57'; Bruno Tabata 81'	Report	Nenê 45+4'	Stadium: Beira-Rio; Attendance: 11,920; Referee: Gustavo Ervino Bauermann

18 August 2024 23	Atlético Goianiense	1–0	Internacional	Goiânia
16:00	Hurtado 68'	Report		Stadium: Antônio Accioly; Attendance: 5,460; Referee: Flávio Rodrigues de Souza

25 August 2024 24	Internacional	1–0	Cruzeiro	Porto Alegre
19:00	Borré 70'	Report		Stadium: Beira-Rio; Attendance: 26,634; Referee: Matheus Delgado Candançan

28 August 2024 5	Cruzeiro	0–0	Internacional	Belo Horizonte
19:30		Report		Stadium: Mineirão; Attendance: 35,238; Referee: Bruno Arleu de Araújo

1 September 2024 25	Juventude	1–3	Internacional	Caxias do Sul
18:30	Oyama 90+2'	Report	Borré 30'; Gabriel Carvalho 34'; Bernabei 59'	Stadium: Alfredo Jaconi; Attendance: 10,721; Referee: Marcelo de Lima Henrique

11 September 2024 19	Internacional	2–1	Fortaleza	Porto Alegre
19:00	Alan Patrick 21'; Gustavo Prado 84'	Report	Titi 45+2'	Stadium: Beira-Rio; Attendance: 23,358; Referee: Gustavo Ervino Bauermann

16 September 2024 26	Internacional	3–0	Cuiabá	Porto Alegre
20:00	Alan Patrick 11' (pen.); Mercado 41'; Borré 73'	Report		Stadium: Beira-Rio; Attendance: 29,013; Referee: Bráulio da Silva Machado

22 September 2024 27	São Paulo	1–3	Internacional	São Paulo
18:30	Luciano 5'	Report	Bruno Gomes 42'; Thiago Maia 54'; Alan Patrick 63'	Stadium: Morumbi; Attendance: 39,078; Referee: Ramon Abatti Abel

25 September 2024 16	Red Bull Bragantino	2–2	Internacional	Bragança Paulista
19:00	Jhon Jhon 43'; Vitinho 75'	Report	Borré 13'; Valencia 77'	Stadium: Nabi Abi Chedid; Attendance: 3,948; Referee: Rodrigo José Pereira de Lima

29 September 2024 28	Internacional	3–1	Vitória	Porto Alegre
18:30	Alan Patrick 45+4' (pen.); Wesley 51', 90+2'	Report	Wagner Leonardo 58'	Stadium: Beira-Rio; Attendance: 38,654; Referee: Wagner do Nascimento Magalhães

5 October 2024 29	Corinthians	2–2	Internacional	São Paulo
19:00	Yuri Alberto 3', 73' (pen.)	Report	Bernabei 17'; Ricardo Mathias 90+4'	Stadium: Neo Química Arena; Attendance: 44,866; Referee: Lucas Paulo Torezin

19 October 2024 30	Internacional	1–0	Grêmio	Porto Alegre
16:00	Borré 67'	Report		Stadium: Beira-Rio; Attendance: 48,049; Referee: Bruno Arleu de Araújo

26 October 2024 31	Atlético Mineiro	1–3	Internacional	Belo Horizonte
19:00	Vargas 45+3' (pen.)	Report	Alan Patrick 38' (pen.); Bernabei 40'; Bruno Tabata 88'	Stadium: Arena MRV; Attendance: 27,028; Referee: Marcelo de Lima Henrique

30 October 2024 17	Internacional	1–1	Flamengo	Porto Alegre
19:00	Valencia 89'	Report	Alcaraz 45+3' (pen.)	Stadium: Beira-Rio; Attendance: 43,729; Referee: Davi de Oliveira Lacerda

5 November 2024 32	Internacional	2–0	Criciúma	Porto Alegre
21:30	Alan Patrick 43'; Wesley 90+3'	Report		Stadium: Beira-Rio; Attendance: 28,143; Referee: Felipe Fernandes de Lima

8 November 2024 33	Internacional	2–0	Fluminense	Porto Alegre
19:00	Borré 52'; Bruno Henrique 90+5'	Report		Stadium: Beira-Rio; Attendance: 35,877; Referee: Luiz Flávio de Oliveira

21 November 2024 34	Vasco	0–1	Internacional	Rio de Janeiro
20:00		Report	Wesley 65'	Stadium: São Januário; Attendance: 17,339; Referee: Rodrigo José Pereira de Lima

24 November 2024 35	Internacional	4–1	Red Bull Bragantino	Porto Alegre
16:00	Alan Patrick 5' (pen.); Borré 28'; Wesley 86'; Wanderson 88'	Report	Juninho Capixaba 20'	Stadium: Beira-Rio; Attendance: 41,762; Referee: Marcelo de Lima Henrique

1 December 2024 36	Flamengo	3–2	Internacional	Rio de Janeiro
16:00	Léo Ortiz 29'; Michael 37', 41'	Report	Wesley 55'; Valencia 62'	Stadium: Maracanã; Attendance: 56,571; Referee: Rodrigo José Pereira de Lima

4 December 2024 37	Internacional	0–1	Botafogo	Porto Alegre
21:30		Report	Savarino 5'	Stadium: Beira-Rio; Attendance: 37,628; Referee: Ramon Abatti Abel

8 December 2024 38	Fortaleza	3–0	Internacional	Fortaleza
16:00	Moisés 7', 20'; Tinga 53'	Report		Stadium: Arena Castelão; Attendance: 51,386; Referee: Matheus Delgado Candançan

=== Copa do Brasil ===
==== First round ====
28 February 2024 Single match	ASA	0–2	Internacional	Arapiraca
20:00 UTC−3		Report	Alario 5'; Vitão 54'	Stadium: Municipal Coaracy da Mata Fonseca; Attendance: 1,044; Referee: Bráulio da Silva Machado

==== Second round ====
13 March 2024 Single match	Nova Iguaçu	0–2	Internacional	Brasília
20:00 UTC−3		Report	Valencia 30', 59'	Stadium: Estádio Nacional Mané Garrincha; Attendance: 7,226; Referee: Luiz Flávio de Oliveira

==== Third round ====
10 July 2024 First leg	Internacional	1–2	Juventude	Porto Alegre
19:00 UTC−3	Valencia 74'	Report	Gilberto 36'; Luís Oyama 90+4'	Stadium: Beira-Rio; Attendance: 20,119; Referee: Flávio Rodrigues de Souza

13 July 2024 Second leg	Juventude	1–1 (3–2 agg.)	Internacional	Caxias do Sul
17:15 UTC−3	Rodrigo Sam 45+6'	Report	Valencia 79' (pen.)	Stadium: Alfredo Jaconi; Attendance: 10,300; Referee: Rodrigo José Pereira de Lima

== Statistics ==
=== Appearances and goals ===
*Only players that featured in at least one match are listed below.

No.	Pos	Nat	Player	Total		Brasileirão		Campeonato Gaúcho		Copa do Brasil		Copa Sudamericana	
No.	Pos	Nat	Player	Apps	Goals	Apps	Goals	Apps	Goals	Apps	Goals	Apps	Goals
12	GK	(Brazil)	Fabrício	10	0	8	0	0	0	0	0	2	0
22	GK	(Brazil)	Ivan	1	0	0	0	1	0	0	0	0	0
24	GK	(Brazil)	Anthoni	19	0	2	0	13	0	4	0	0	0
33	GK	(Uruguay)	Rochet	35	0	28	0	1	0	0	0	6	0
2	DF	(Spain)	Mallo^{x}	11	1	6	1	2	0	0	0	3	0
3	DF	(Brazil)	Igor Gomes^{x}	25	2	13	1	4	1	2	0	6	0
4	DF	(Brazil)	Robert Renan^{x}	31	0	12	0	12	0	3	0	4	0
6	DF	(Brazil)	Renê	36	1	15	0	12	1	2	0	7	0
16	DF	(Argentina)	Bustos^{x}	36	1	11	1	13	0	4	0	8	0
18	DF	(Uruguay)	Rogel	15	0	15	0	0	0	0	0	0	0
20	DF	(Brazil)	Clayton Sampaio	8	0	8	0	0	0	0	0	0	0
23	DF	(Brazil)	Nathan	1	0	1	0	0	0	0	0	0	0
25	DF	(Argentina)	Mercado	32	1	17	1	9	0	2	0	4	0
26	DF	(Argentina)	Bernabei	25	3	23	3	0	0	0	0	2	0
35	DF	(Argentina)	Aguirre	1	0	1	0	0	0	0	0	0	0
36	DF	(Brazil)	Thauan Lara^{x}	1	0	0	0	1	0	0	0	0	0
44	DF	(Brazil)	Vitão	51	1	30	0	12	0	4	1	5	0
5	MF	(Brazil)	Fernando	31	1	24	1	0	0	3	0	4	0
7	MF	(Brazil)	Hyoran	21	1	10	0	10	1	0	0	1	0
8	MF	(Brazil)	Bruno Henrique	62	4	37	3	13	1	4	0	8	0
10	MF	(Brazil)	Alan Patrick	45	12	23	8	11	3	4	0	7	1
14	MF	(Uruguay)	De Pena^{x}	5	1	0	0	5	1	0	0	0	0
15	MF	(Brazil)	Bruno Gomes	43	2	30	1	5	0	4	0	4	1
17	MF	(Brazil)	Campanharo^{x}	2	0	0	0	2	0	0	0	0	0
17	MF	(Brazil)	Bruno Tabata	17	2	17	2	0	0	0	0	0	0
20	MF	(Chile)	Aránguiz^{x}	23	1	7	0	12	1	2	0	2	0
23	MF	(Brazil)	Gabriel^{x}	2	0	0	0	2	0	0	0	0	0
27	MF	(Brazil)	Maurício^{x}	17	2	5	0	5	2	2	0	5	0
29	MF	(Brazil)	Thiago Maia	32	2	27	2	0	0	0	0	5	0
34	MF	(Brazil)	Gabriel Carvalho	26	1	24	1	0	0	1	0	1	0
39	MF	(Brazil)	Luis Otávio	6	0	6	0	0	0	0	0	0	0
40	MF	(Brazil)	Rômulo	47	0	30	0	12	0	2	0	3	0
41	MF	(Brazil)	Matheus Dias^{x}	3	0	3	0	0	0	0	0	0	0
42	MF	(Brazil)	Gabriel Barros^{x}	2	0	0	0	2	0	0	0	0	0
47	MF	(Brazil)	Gustavo Prado	41	1	28	1	4	0	2	0	7	0
9	FW	(Brazil)	Luiz Adriano^{x}	4	0	0	0	4	0	0	0	0	0
11	FW	(Brazil)	Wanderson	43	5	23	2	13	3	4	0	3	0
13	FW	(Ecuador)	Valencia	40	11	24	3	11	4	3	4	2	0
19	FW	(Colombia)	Borré	29	11	23	9	0	0	1	0	5	2
21	FW	(Brazil)	Wesley	48	13	33	11	3	1	4	0	8	1
28	FW	(Brazil)	Pedro Henrique^{x}	4	1	0	0	4	1	0	0	0	0
31	FW	(Argentina)	Alario	36	5	15	0	11	2	4	1	6	2
45	FW	(Brazil)	Lucca Holanda	27	2	9	0	11	2	1	0	6	0
48	FW	(Brazil)	Lucca Drummond	5	0	5	0	0	0	0	0	0	0
49	FW	(Brazil)	Ricardo Mathias	6	1	6	1	0	0	0	0	0	0

Source: Internacional - oGol

^{x} Player left during the season.

=== Assists ===
Rank	No.	Pos.	Nat.	Player	Brasileirão	Campeonato Gaúcho	Copa do Brasil	Sudamericana	Total
1	10	MF	(Brazil)	Alan Patrick	2	4	1	0	7
2	26	DF	(Argentina)	Bernabei	6	0	0	0	6
3	11	FW	(Belgium)	Wanderson	2	2	1	0	5
3	8	MF	(Brazil)	Bruno Henrique	1	3	0	1	5
5	13	FW	(Ecuador)	Enner Valencia	1	3	0	0	4
5	29	MF	(Brazil)	Thiago Maia	4	0	0	0	4
7	17	MF	(Brazil)	Bruno Tabata	3	0	0	0	3
7	16	DF	(Argentina)	Bustos	1	1	1	0	3
7	34	MF	(Brazil)	Gabriel Carvalho	3	0	0	0	3
10	15	MF	(Brazil)	Bruno Gomes	2	0	0	0	2
10	19	FW	(Colombia)	Borré	2	0	0	0	2
10	4	DF	(Brazil)	Robert Renan	1	1	0	0	2
10	47	FW	(Brazil)	Gustavo Prado	1	1	0	0	2
10	6	DF	(Brazil)	Renê	0	0	1	1	2
10	21	FW	(Brazil)	Wesley	1	0	0	1	2
16	44	DF	(Brazil)	Vitão	0	0	0	1	1
16	27	MF	(Brazil)	Maurício	0	1	0	0	1
16	48	FW	(Brazil)	Lucca Drummond	1	0	0	0	1
16	45	FW	(Brazil)	Lucca Holanda	0	1	0	0	1
16	7	MF	(Brazil)	Hyoran	0	0	0	1	1
16	3	DF	(Brazil)	Igor Gomes	1	0	0	0	1
16	18	DF	(Uruguay)	Rogel	1	0	0	0	1
