= Marlon (footballer, born 2005) =

Brazilian footballer

Personal information
- Full name: Marlon Yan Cavalcanti da Silva
- Date of birth: 19 June 2005 (age 21)
- Place of birth: Recife, Brazil
- Height: 1.77 m (5 ft 10 in)
- Position: Forward

Team information
- Current team: Ituano

Youth career
- Retrô
- 2021: → São Paulo (loan)
- 2021–2023: Red Bull Bragantino
- 2023–2025: Ituano
- 2024–2025: → Internacional (loan)

Senior career*
Years	Team	Apps	(Gls)
2024–	Ituano	19	(0)
2024–2025	→ Internacional (loan)	0	(0)
- * Club domestic league appearances and goals as of 22:41, 28 January 2026 (UTC)

Marlon Yan Cavalcanti da Silva (born 19 June 2005), known as Marlinho or just Marlon, is a Brazilian professional footballer who plays as a forward for Ituano.

== Career ==
Born in Recife, Pernambuco, Marlon began his career with hometown side Retrô. In May 2021, he was loaned to São Paulo, but moved to Red Bull Bragantino shortly after.

In 2023, Marlon joined Ituano and was initially a member of the under-20 squad. Promoted to the first team in January 2024, he signed a professional contract with the club shortly after, and made his senior debut on 21 January, coming on as a half-time substitute for Marcelo Mineiro in a 2–0 Campeonato Paulista away loss to São Bernardo.

== Career statistics ==
As of 28 May 2025

Appearances and goals by club, season and competition
Club	Season	League			State League		National Cup		Continental		Other		Total	
Club	Season	Division	Apps	Goals	Apps	Goals	Apps	Goals	Apps	Goals	Apps	Goals	Apps	Goals
Ituano	2024	Série B	7	0	10	0	0	0	—		—		17	0
Internacional	2024	Série A	0	0	—		—		—		8 (Note: Appearance(s) in Copa FGF)	2	8	2
Internacional	2025	Série A	0	0	0	0	0	0	0	0	—		0	0
Internacional	Total		0	0	0	0	0	0	0	0	8	2	8	2
Career total			7	0	10	0	0	0	0	0	8	2	25	2
