= Kauan Jesus =

Brazilian footballer (born 2003)

Personal information
- Full name: Kauan Jesus Santos Oliveira
- Date of birth: 27 April 2003 (age 23)
- Place of birth: Jundiaí, Brazil
- Height: 1.92 m (6 ft 4 in)
- Position: Goalkeeper

Team information
- Current team: Internacional
- Number: 22

Youth career
- Tanabi
- 2022–2023: SKA Brasil
- 2023: → Internacional (loan)
- 2023–2024: Internacional

Senior career*
Years	Team	Apps	(Gls)
2024–	Internacional	1	(0)
- * Club domestic league appearances and goals as of 01:44, 19 October 2026 (UTC)

Kauan Jesus Santos Oliveira (born 27 April 2003), known as Kauan Jesus, is a Brazilian professional footballer who plays as a goalkeeper for Internacional.

== Career ==
Born in Jundiaí, São Paulo, Kauan Jesus joined Internacional in March 2023, on loan from SKA Brasil. He was subsequently bought outright, and started to train with the first team in 2024 before renewing his contract until 2027 on 13 November 2025.

Kauan Jesus started the 2026 season as a third-choice behind Sergio Rochet and Anthoni, but moved down the pecking order after the arrival of Matheus Cunha. He made his professional – and Série A – on 16 October of that year, coming on as a first-half substitute for Alexandro Bernabei in a 2–0 away loss to Mirassol, as Cunha was sent off.

== Career statistics ==
As of 18 October 2026

Appearances and goals by club, season and competition
Club	Season	League			State League		National Cup		Continental		Other		Total	
Club	Season	Division	Apps	Goals	Apps	Goals	Apps	Goals	Apps	Goals	Apps	Goals	Apps	Goals
Internacional	2024	Série A	0	0	0	0	0	0	0	0	—		0	0
Internacional	2025	Série A	0	0	0	0	0	0	0	0	6 (Note: Appearance(s) in Copa FGF)	0	6	0
Internacional	2026	Série A	1	0	0	0	0	0	—		0	0	1	0
Career total			1	0	0	0	0	0	0	0	6	0	7	0

== Honours ==
Internacional

- Recopa Gaúcha: 2026
