= 2025 Grêmio Novorizontino season =

Grêmio Novorizontino
2025 season
- Manager: Eduardo Baptista
- Stadium: Estádio Doutor Jorge Ismael de Biasi
- Série B: Pre-season
- Campeonato Paulista: Pre-season
- Average home league attendance: 1,869
Home colours

The 2025 season is the 13th year in the history of Grêmio Novorizontino. The club will participate in the Campeonato Brasileiro Série B for the fourth consecutive season, the Campeonato Paulista, and the Copa do Brasil.

== Squad ==
=== Transfers In ===
Pos.	Player	Transferred from	Fee	Date	Source
MF	(Brazil) Luís Oyama	(Brazil) Botafogo	Loan	6 January 2025	
FW	(Brazil) Vitinho	(Brazil) Palmeiras	Loan	7 January 2025	
MF	(Brazil) Bruno José	(Japan) Júbilo Iwata	Loan	17 January 2025	
MF	(Brazil) Fábio Matheus	(Brazil) Sport Recife	Loan	17 January 2025	

=== Transfers Out ===
Pos.	Player	Transferred to	Fee	Date	Source
MF	(Brazil) Eduardo	(South Korea) FC Anyang	Free	5 January 2025	
DF	(Brazil) Danilo Barcelos	(Brazil) Ponte Preta	Contract terminated	13 January 2025	
MF	(Brazil) Lucas Café	(Brazil) Boavista	Loan	14 January 2025	

== Friendlies ==
22 March 2025 Friendly	Botafogo (Brazil)	3–1	(Brazil) Novorizontino

== Competitions ==
=== Overall record ===
Competition	First match	Last match	Starting round	Record							
Competition	First match	Last match	Starting round	Pld	W	D	L	GF	GA	GD	Win %
Série B	5 April 2025	22 November 2025	Matchday 1	0	0	0	0	0	0	+0	—
Campeonato Paulista	15 January 2025			2	0	1	1	2	3	−1	0.00
Copa do Brasil				0	0	0	0	0	0	+0	—
Total				2	0	1	1	2	3	−1	0.00

Last updated: 18 January 2025
Source: Competitions

=== Série B ===
==== League table ====
Pos	Team	Pld	W	D	L	GF	GA	GD	Pts
5	Criciúma	38	17	10	11	47	33	+14	61
6	Goiás	38	17	10	11	42	37	+5	61
7	Novorizontino	38	15	15	8	43	32	+11	60
8	CRB	38	16	8	14	45	40	+5	56
9	Avaí	38	14	14	10	50	40	+10	56

Source: CBF
Rules for classification: 1) points; 2) wins; 3) goal difference; 4) goals scored; 5) head-to-head results (only between 2 teams); 6) fewest red cards; 7) fewest yellow cards; 8) drawing of lots.

==== Matches ====
11 May 2025 7	Novorizontino	v	Ferroviária	Novo Horizonte
18:30 UTC−3				Stadium: Estádio Doutor Jorge Ismael de Biasi

26 July 2025 19	CRB	4–0	Novorizontino

3 August 2025 20	Novorizontino	1–1	Avaí

9 August 2025 21	Volta Redonda	0–0	Novorizontino

14 August 2025 22	Novorizontino	1–2	Coritiba

=== Campeonato Paulista ===
The schedule was released on 2 December 2024.

==== Results by round ====
Round	1	2	3
Ground	H	A	H
Result	L	D	
Position			

Updated to match(es) played on 18 January 2025. Source:
A = Away; H = Home; W = Win; D = Draw; L = Loss

15 January 2025 1	Novorizontino	0–1	Ponte Preta	Novo Horizonte
18:30 UTC−3				Stadium: Estádio Doutor Jorge Ismael de Biasi; Referee: Daiane Caroline Muniz dos Santos

18 January 2025 2	Portuguesa	2–2	Novorizontino	Canindé
20:30 UTC−3				Stadium: Estádio do Canindé; Referee: Luiz Flávio de Oliveira

21 January 2025 3	Novorizontino	1–1	Inter Limeira	Novo Horizonte
19:30 UTC−3	Airton (red card) 15'; Renato Palm 76'	Report	Leocovick (yellow card) 79'; Alex Sandro 90'	Stadium: Estádio Doutor Jorge Ismael de Biasi; Attendance: 1,611; Referee: (Brazil) Guilherme da Silva E Rosario

25 January 2025 4	Palmeiras	1–2	Novorizontino	Barueri
20:30	Torres 42'; Moreno (yellow card) 45+3'; Abel Ferreira (yellow card) 89'	Report	Pablo Dyego (yellow card) 62' (goal) 68' (pen.); Robson 83'; Jordi (yellow card) 89'; Bruno José (yellow card) 90+7'	Stadium: Arena Barueri; Attendance: 10,135; Referee: (Brazil) Lucas Canetto Bellote

28 January 2025 5	Novorizontino	1–1	Velo	Novo Horizonte
21:30	Pedro Balotelli (yellow card) 2'; Waguininho 74'	Report	Daniel Amorim 63'; Marcelo Augusto (yellow card) 67'; Yuri Ferraz (yellow card) 71'	Stadium: Estádio Doutor Jorge Ismael de Biasi; Attendance: 1,343; Referee: (Brazil) Vinicius Gonçalves

31 January 2025 6	RB Bragantino	1–2	Novorizontino	Bragança
19:30	Mosquera 45+1'; Gabriel (yellow card) 67'; André Cardoso da Silva Júnior (yellow card) 90+1'	Report	Robson 25' (pen.); Fábio Matheus 69'; César Martins (yellow card) 72'	Stadium: Estádio Cícero de Souza Marques; Attendance: 3,226; Referee: (Brazil) Raphael Claus

3 February 2025 11	Novorizontino	0–1	Corinthians	Novo Horizonte
21:30	Airton (yellow card) 30'; Waguininho (yellow card) 38'; Jean (yellow card) 60'; Luís Oyama (yellow card) 90+8'	Report	Torres (yellow card) 41'; Alex Santana 66'; Pedro Raul (yellow card) 73'	Stadium: Estádio Doutor Jorge Ismael de Biasi; Attendance: 9,310; Referee: (Brazil) Lucas Canetto Bellote

6 February 2025 7	São Bernardo	1–1	Novorizontino	São Bernardo do Campo
19:00	Rodrigo Ferreira (yellow card) 40'; Fabrício Daniel (yellow card) 67'; Hugo Sanches 86'	Report	Patrick (yellow card) 21'; Robson (yellow card) 28'; Jean 45+2'; Luís Oyama (yellow card) 90+3'	Stadium: Estádio 1º de Maio; Attendance: 524; Referee: (Brazil) Gabriel Meira

=== Copa do Brasil ===
==== Third round ====
30 April 2025 First leg	Novorizontino	0–1	Corinthians	Novo Horizonte
21:30		Report	Hernández 12'	Stadium: Jorge Ismael de Biasi; Referee: Wilton Sampaio
