= 2023 CR Vasco da Gama season =

Vasco da Gama
2023 season
- SAF owner: 777 Partners (70%)
- Chairman: Jorge Salgado
- Manager: Maurício Barbieri (until 23 June); Ramón Díaz (from 17 July)
- Stadium: São Januário
- Campeonato Brasileiro Série A: 15th
- Campeonato Carioca: Semi-finals
- Copa do Brasil: Second round
- Top goalscorer: League: Pablo Vegetti (10); All: Pablo Vegetti (10)
- Biggest win: Vasco da Gama 5–0 Resende
- Biggest defeat: Vasco da Gama 1–4 Flamengo; Santos 4–1 Vasco da Gama
Home colours	Away colours	Third colours

The 2023 season was the 125th in the history of Club de Regatas Vasco da Gama and marked the club's return to the Campeonato Brasileiro Série A following promotion from Série B in 2022. In addition to competing in the Série A, Vasco da Gama also participated in the Campeonato Carioca and the Copa do Brasil.

== Squad ==
Note: Flags indicate national team as defined under FIFA eligibility rules; some limited exceptions apply. Players may hold more than one non-FIFA nationality.

No.	Pos.	Nation	Player
1	GK	BRA	Léo Jardim
2	DF	URU	José Luis Rodríguez
3	DF	BRA	Léo
4	DF	BRA	Maicon
4	DF	BRA	Anderson Conceição
5	MF	BRA	Patrick de Lucca
5	MF	BRA	Matheus Barbosa
6	DF	BRA	Edimar
6	DF	ITA	Lucas Piton
7	FW	BRA	Alex Teixeira
8	MF	BRA	Jair
9	FW	PAR	Sebastián Ferreira
9	FW	BRA	Pedro Raul
9	FW	BRA	Zé Vitor
10	MF	FRA	Dimitri Payet
10	MF	BRA	Nenê
11	FW	BRA	Gabriel Pec
11	DF	BRA	Erick Farias
12	DF	BRA	Jefferson
12	FW	BRA	Rwan Cruz
13	DF	BRA	Gabriel Dias
14	FW	ARG	Luca Orellano
15	MF	BRA	Lucas Eduardo
15	FW	BRA	Figueiredo
16	DF	BRA	Matheus Julião
16	FW	BRA	Erick Marcus
17	MF	CHI	Gary Medel
17	MF	BRA	Marlon Santos
17	DF	BRA	Vinícius Paiva

No.	Pos.	Nation	Player
18	MF	BRA	Andrey Santos
18	MF	BRA	Paulinho Paula
19	MF	PAR	Matías Galarza
20	MF	ARG	Gabriel Carabajal
21	MF	BRA	Bruno Praxedes
21	FW	BRA	Eguinaldo
22	DF	ARG	Manuel Capasso
23	MF	BRA	Zé Gabriel
23	FW	BRA	Juan Alvina
24	GK	BRA	Halls
25	MF	BRA	Marlon Gomes
26	MF	BRA	Rodrigo
29	DF	BRA	Paulinho
30	DF	BRA	Robson
31	DF	BRA	Eric Pimentel
31	FW	BRA	Rossi
33	DF	BRA	Lyncon
35	DF	BRA	Miranda
40	DF	BRA	Ulisses
42	FW	BRA	Cauã Paixão
44	DF	BRA	Zé Vitor
45	DF	BRA	Riquelme
50	MF	BRA	Juninho
55	GK	BRA	Alexander
66	DF	BRA	Paulo Victor
70	FW	BRA	Serginho
77	FW	BRA	Rayan
85	MF	BRA	Mateus Carvalho
88	MF	BRA	Cauan Barros
96	DF	BRA	Paulo Henrique
97	GK	BRA	Ivan
99	FW	BRA	GB
99	FW	ARG	Pablo Vegetti

== Transfers ==
=== In ===
Pos.	Player	Transferred from	Fee	Date	Source
DF	(Brazil) Lucas Piton	(Brazil) Corinthians	€3,000,000	1 January 2023	
FW	(Brazil) Pedro Raul	(Japan) Kashiwa Reysol	€1,900,000	1 January 2023	
DF	(Brazil) Robson Bambu	(France) Nice	Loan	3 January 2023	
DF	(Uruguay) José Luis Rodríguez	(Uruguay) Nacional	€1,800,000	4 January 2023	
GK	(Brazil) Ivan	(Brazil) Corinthians	Loan	10 January 2023	
MF	(Brazil) Jair	(Brazil) Atlético Mineiro	Undisclosed	13 January 2023	
MF	(Argentina) Luca Orellano	(Argentina) Vélez Sarsfield	€3,700,000	13 January 2023	
GK	(Brazil) Léo Jardim	(France) Lille	€2,000,000	27 January 2023	
DF	(Argentina) Manuel Capasso	(Argentina) Atlético Tucumán	€1,400,000	19 February 2023	
DF	(Brazil) Paulo Henrique	(Brazil) Atlético Mineiro	Loan	25 February 2023	
MF	(Brazil) Mateus Carvalho	(Brazil) Náutico	Loan	14 April 2023	
DF	(Brazil) Maicon	(Brazil) Santos	Free	1 July 2023	
MF	(Brazil) Serginho	(Turkey) Giresunspor	Free	1 July 2023	
DF	(Chile) Gary Medel	(Italy) Bologna	Free	11 July 2023	
MF	(Brazil) Paulinho Paula	(Saudi Arabia) Al-Shabab	€1,200,000	26 July 2023	
MF	(Brazil) Bruno Praxedes	(Brazil) Red Bull Bragantino	Loan	26 July 2023	
FW	(Argentina) Pablo Vegetti	(Argentina) Belgrano	€1,000,000	2 August 2023	
MF	(Brazil) Rossi	Unattached	Free	9 August 2023	

=== Out ===
Pos.	Player	Transferred to	Fee	Date	Source
GK	(Brazil) Alexander	(Brazil) Avaí	Loan	9 February 2023	
MF	(Brazil) Nenê	(Brazil) Juventude	Released	10 April 2023	
DF	(Brazil) Paulo Victor	(Brazil) Internacional	Loan return	30 June 2023	
MF	(Brazil) Rodrigo	(Brazil) Londrina	Loan	21 July 2023	
FW	(Brazil) Pedro Raul	(Mexico) Toluca	€4,500,000	22 July 2023	
FW	(Brazil) Eguinaldo	(Ukraine) Shakhtar Donetsk	€3,500,000	31 July 2023	
MF	(Paraguay) Matías Galarza	(Argentina) Talleres	Loan	31 August 2023	

== Competitions ==
=== Série A ===
==== League table ====
Pos	Team	Pld	W	D	L	GF	GA	GD	Pts	Qualification or relegation
13	Corinthians	38	12	14	12	47	48	−1	50	Qualification for Copa Sudamericana group stage
14	Cruzeiro	38	11	14	13	35	32	+3	47	Qualification for Copa Sudamericana group stage
15	Vasco da Gama	38	12	9	17	41	51	−10	45	
16	Bahia	38	12	8	18	50	53	−3	44	
17	Santos (R)	38	11	10	17	39	64	−25	43	Relegation to Campeonato Brasileiro Série B

Source: CBF
Rules for classification: 1) points; 2) wins; 3) goal difference; 4) goals scored; 5) head-to-head results (only between two teams); 6) fewest red cards; 7) fewest yellow cards; 8) drawing of lots.
(R) Relegated

==== Results summary ====
Overall								Home						Away					
Pld	W	D	L	GF	GA	GD	Pts	W	D	L	GF	GA	GD	W	D	L	GF	GA	GD
38	12	9	17	41	51	−10	45	9	2	8	24	23	+1	3	7	9	17	28	−11

==== Results by round ====
Round	1	2	3	4	5	6	7	8	9	10	11	12	13	14	15	16	17	18	19	20	21	22	23	24	25	26	27	28	29	30	31	32	33	34	35	36	37	38
Ground	A	H	H	A	A	H	A	A	H	A	H	H	A	H	A	H	A	H	A	H	A	A	H	H	A	H	H	A	H	A	A	H	A	H	A	H	A	H
Result	W	D	L	D	D	L	L	L	L	L	L	W	L	L	W	L	L	W	D	W	L	D	W	W	L	D	W	L	L	D	W	W	D	W	D	L	L	W
Position																																						

A = Away; H = Home; W = Win; D = Draw; L = Loss

==== Matches ====
16 April 2023 1	Atlético Mineiro	1–2	Vasco da Gama

23 April 2023 2	Vasco da Gama	2–2	Palmeiras

2 May 2023 3	Vasco da Gama	0–1	Bahia

7 May 2023 4	Fluminense	1–1	Vasco da Gama

11 May 2023 5	Coritiba	1–1	Vasco da Gama

14 May 2023 6	Vasco da Gama	0–1	Santos

20 May 2023 7	São Paulo	4–2	Vasco da Gama

27 May 2023 8	Fortaleza	2–0	Vasco da Gama

6 June 2023 9	Vasco da Gama	1–4	Flamengo

11 June 2023 10	Internacional	2–1	Vasco da Gama

23 June 2023 11	Vasco da Gama	0–1	Goiás

27 June 2023 12	Vasco da Gama	1–0	Cuiabá

2 July 2023 13	Botafogo	2–0	Vasco da Gama

8 July 2023 14	Vasco da Gama	0–1	Cruzeiro

23 July 2023 16	Vasco da Gama	0–2	Athletico Paranaense

29 July 2023 17	Corinthians	3–1	Vasco da Gama

6 August 2023 18	Vasco da Gama	1–0	Grêmio

15 August 2023 19	Red Bull Bragantino	1–1	Vasco da Gama

20 August 2023 20	Vasco da Gama	1–0	Atlético Mineiro

27 August 2023 21	Palmeiras	1–0	Vasco da Gama

3 September 2023 22	Bahia	1–1	Vasco da Gama

16 September 2023 23	Vasco da Gama	4–2	Fluminense

22 September 2023 24	Vasco da Gama	5–1	Coritiba

26 September 2023 15	América Mineiro	0–1	Vasco da Gama

1 October 2023 25	Santos	4–1	Vasco da Gama

7 October 2023 26	Vasco da Gama	0–0	São Paulo

19 October 2023 27	Vasco da Gama	1–0	Fortaleza

22 October 2023 28	Flamengo	1–0	Vasco da Gama

26 October 2023 29	Vasco da Gama	1–2	Internacional

29 October 2023 30	Goiás	1–1	Vasco da Gama

2 November 2023 31	Cuiabá	0–2	Vasco da Gama

6 November 2023 32	Vasco da Gama	1–0	Botafogo

12 November 2023 34	Vasco da Gama	2–1	América Mineiro

22 November 2023 33	Cruzeiro	2–2	Vasco da Gama

25 November 2023 35	Athletico Paranaense	0–0	Vasco da Gama

29 November 2023 36	Vasco da Gama	2–4	Corinthians

3 December 2023 37	Grêmio	1–0	Vasco da Gama

7 December 2023 38	Vasco da Gama	2–1	Red Bull Bragantino

=== Campeonato Carioca ===
==== Taça Guanabara ====
14 January 2023 1	Vasco da Gama	0–0	Madureira

20 January 2023 2	Audax Rio	1–1	Vasco da Gama

26 January 2023 4	Portuguesa	0–2	Vasco da Gama

31 January 2023 5	Vasco da Gama	1–2	Volta Redonda

2 February 2023 6	Vasco da Gama	5–0	Resende

8 February 2023 7	Nova Iguaçu	0–2	Vasco da Gama

12 February 2023 8	Fluminense	2–0	Vasco da Gama

17 February 2023 3	Vasco da Gama	2–0	Botafogo

27 February 2023 9	Vasco da Gama	4–1	Boavista

5 March 2023 10	Flamengo	0–1	Vasco da Gama

9 March 2023 11	Vasco da Gama	2–0	Bangu

===== Semi-finals =====
13 March 2023 First leg	Flamengo	3–2	Vasco da Gama	Rio de Janeiro
21:25 UTC−3				Stadium: Maracanã Stadium

19 March 2023 Second leg	Vasco da Gama	1–3	Flamengo	Rio de Janeiro
18:00 UTC−3	Alex Teixeira (yellow card) 27'; Capasso 31'; Jair (yellow card) 36'; Gabriel Pec (yellow card) 64'		David Luiz (yellow card) 10'; Pedro 16', 84' (pen.); Fabrício Bruno (yellow card) 44'; Gerson (yellow card) 70'; Guillermo Varela (yellow card) 89'; Ayrton Lucas Dantas de Medeiros 90+5'	Stadium: Maracanã Stadium; Attendance: 49,779; Referee: Bruno Arleu de Araujo

=== Copa do Brasil ===
23 February 2023 First round	Trem	0–4	Vasco da Gama	Brasília
21:30 UTC−3			Erick Marcus 13'; Pedro Raul 29'; Nenê 61'; Jair 90+5' (pen.)	Stadium: Estádio Nacional Mané Garrincha

16 March 2023 Second round	Vasco da Gama	0–0 (5–6 p)	ABC	Rio de Janeiro
21:30 UTC−3				Stadium: São Januário; Referee: Paulo Cesar Zanovelli
