= Lucca Drummond =

Brazilian footballer

Personal information
- Full name: Lucca Pelosi Drummond
- Date of birth: 12 January 2004 (age 22)
- Place of birth: Rio de Janeiro, Brazil
- Height: 1.89 m (6 ft 2 in)
- Position: Forward

Youth career
- Avaí
- Criciúma
- 2018–2024: São Paulo
- 2024: Internacional

Senior career*
Years	Team	Apps	(Gls)
2024–2026	Internacional	5	(0)
- * Club domestic league appearances and goals as of 14:27, 10 August 2026 (UTC)

Lucca Pelosi Drummond (born 12 January 2004), known as Lucca Drummond, is a Brazilian professional footballer who plays as a forward.

== Club career ==
Born in Rio de Janeiro, Lucca Drummond played for the youth sides of Avaí and Criciúma before joining São Paulo in 2018. In March 2024, he moved to Internacional and was initially assigned to the under-20 team.

Luca Drummond made his senior – and Série A – debut on 19 June 2024, coming on as a second-half substitute for Lucas Alario in a 1–0 home win over Corinthians.

== Career statistics ==
As of 10 August 2026

Appearances and goals by club, season and competition
Club	Season	League			State League		National Cup		Continental		Other		Total	
Club	Season	Division	Apps	Goals	Apps	Goals	Apps	Goals	Apps	Goals	Apps	Goals	Apps	Goals
Internacional	2024	Série A	5	0	—		0	0	0	0	3 (Note: Appearance(s) in Copa FGF)	0	8	0
Internacional	2025	Série A	—		—		—		—		2	0	2	0
Career total			5	0	0	0	0	0	0	0	5	0	10	0
