= Ricardo Mathias =

Brazilian footballer (born 2006)

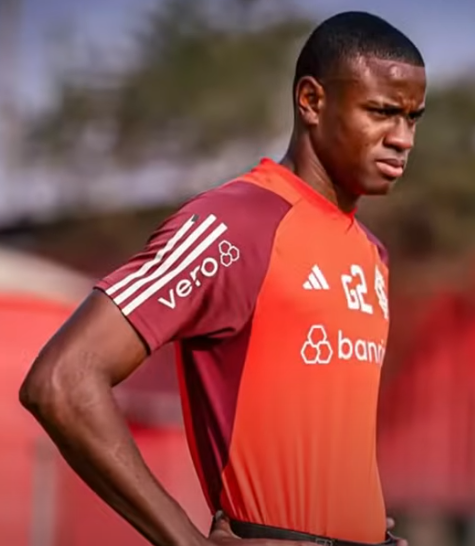
- Mathias in 2024

Personal information
- Full name: Ricardo Mathias da Silva
- Date of birth: 26 July 2006 (age 20)
- Place of birth: Nova Iguaçu, Brazil
- Height: 1.92 m (6 ft 4 in)
- Position: Forward

Team information
- Current team: Al-Shabab
- Number: 49

Youth career
- 2021: Ferroviária
- 2022–2024: Internacional

Senior career*
Years	Team	Apps	(Gls)
2024–2026	Internacional	29	(6)
2026–	Al-Ahli	3	(0)
2026–	→ Al-Shabab (loan)	5	(4)

International career^{‡}
2023	Brazil U17	5	(1)
2025–	Brazil U20	2	(1)
Medal record
Men's football
Representing Brazil
South American U-20 Championship
Winner	2025 Venezuela
- * Club domestic league appearances and goals as of 30 October 2026 ‡ National team caps and goals as of 16:28, 17 February 2025 (UTC)

Ricardo Mathias da Silva (born 25 July 2006) is a Brazilian professional footballer who plays as a forward for Saudi Pro League club Al-Shabab, on loan from Al Ahli.

== Club career ==
Born in Nova Iguaçu, Rio de Janeiro, Mathias played amateur football in his hometown before joining the youth sides of Ferroviária in 2021. In the following year, he moved to Internacional and was initially assigned to the under-17 squad.

Mathias made his senior – and Série A – debut on 11 August 2024, coming on as a late substitute for Rômulo in a 2–2 home draw against Athletico Paranaense. He scored his first professional goal on 5 October, netting a last-minute equalizer in an away draw against Corinthians for the same scoreline.

On 23 October 2024, Mathias renewed his contract with the Colorado until 2028.

On 4 January 2026, Mathias joined Saudi Pro League club Al-Ahli.

== International career ==
In September 2022, Mathias was called up to the Brazil national under-17 team, and played in the 2023 South American U-17 Championship.

He also was part of the squad which won the 2025 South American U-20 Championship, scoring a goal on the last match of the tournament.

== Career statistics ==
As of 28 May 2025

Appearances and goals by club, season and competition
Club	Season	League			State League		National Cup		Continental		Other		Total	
Club	Season	Division	Apps	Goals	Apps	Goals	Apps	Goals	Apps	Goals	Apps	Goals	Apps	Goals
Internacional	2024	Série A	6	1	0	0	0	0	0	0	—		6	1
Internacional	2025	Série A	3	1	1	0	1	0	2 (Note: Appearance(s) in Copa Libertadores)	1	—		7	2
Career total			9	2	1	0	1	0	2	1	0	0	13	3

== Honours ==
Internacional

- Campeonato Gaúcho: 2025

Brazil U17

- South American U-17 Championship: 2023

Brazil U20

- South American Youth Football Championship: 2025
