= Paulo Victor (footballer, born 2001) =

Brazilian footballer

Personal information
- Full name: Paulo Victor de Almeida Barbosa
- Date of birth: 13 April 2001 (age 25)
- Place of birth: Bocaiúva, Brazil
- Height: 1.78 m (5 ft 10 in)
- Position: Left back

Team information
- Current team: Querétaro
- Number: 12

Youth career
- Nova Iguaçu
- 2020–2021: → Botafogo (loan)

Senior career*
Years	Team	Apps	(Gls)
2020–2021	Nova Iguaçu	3	(0)
2021	→ Botafogo (loan)	12	(0)
2021	Botafogo	5	(0)
2021–2024	Internacional	27	(0)
2022–2023	→ Vasco da Gama (loan)	14	(0)
2023–2024	→ Ceará (loan)	27	(0)
2024–2025	Farense	24	(0)
2025–2026	Santa Clara	19	(1)
2026–	Querétaro	0	(0)
- * Club domestic league appearances and goals as of 11 May 2026

Paulo Victor de Almeida Barbosa (born 13 April 2001), known as Paulo Victor, is a Brazilian footballer who plays as a left back for Liga MX club Querétaro.

== Club career ==
Born in Bocaiúva, Minas Gerais but raised in Piabetá, Magé, Rio de Janeiro, Paulo Victor was a Nova Iguaçu youth graduate. He made his first team debut on 19 February 2020, starting in a 2–2 Campeonato Carioca home draw against America-RJ.

In November 2020, Paulo Victor moved to Botafogo on loan, and was initially assigned to the under-20s. He began the 2021 campaign in the first team, and subsequently became a starter for the club before signing a permanent deal until 2024 on 21 May 2021.

On 25 June 2021, Paulo Victor signed a three-and-a-half-year deal with Internacional in the Série A. He made his top tier debut on 3 July, starting in a 1–1 away draw against Corinthians.

== Career statistics ==
As of 11 May 2026

Club	Season	League			State League		Cup		Continental		Other		Total	
Club	Season	Division	Apps	Goals	Apps	Goals	Apps	Goals	Apps	Goals	Apps	Goals	Apps	Goals
Nova Iguaçu	2020	Carioca	—		3	0	—		—		—		3	0
Botafogo	2021	Série B	5	0	12	0	1	0	—		—		18	0
Internacional	2021	Série A	19	0	—		—		0	0	—		19	0
Internacional	2022	Série A	0	0	8	0	—		0	0	—		8	0
Internacional	Total		19	0	8	0	—		0	0	—		27	0
Vasco da Gama (loan)	2022	Série B	6	0	—		—		—		—		6	0
Vasco da Gama (loan)	2023	Série A	1	0	7	0	1	0	—		—		9	0
Vasco da Gama (loan)	Total		7	0	7	0	1	0	—		—		15	0
Ceará (loan)	2023	Série B	12	0	0	0	0	0	—		—		12	0
Ceará (loan)	2024	Série B	12	0	3	0	0	0	—		7 (Note: Appearances in Copa do Nordeste)	0	22	0
Ceará (loan)	Total		24	0	3	0	0	0	—		7	0	34	0
Farense	2024–25	Primeira Liga	24	0	—		2	0	—		—		26	0
Santa Clara	2025–26	Primeira Liga	19	1	—		3	0	5 (Note: Appearances in UEFA Conference League)	0	0	0	27	1
Career total			98	1	33	0	10	0	5	0	7	0	150	1

== Honours ==
Ceará

- Campeonato Cearense: 2024
