= 2021 Botafogo FR season =

Botafogo
2021 season
- Manager: Marcelo Chamusca (until 13 July); Ricardo Resende (caretaker, from 16 July)
- Stadium: Estádio Nilton Santos
- Campeonato Brasileiro Série B: 1st (promoted)
- Campeonato Carioca: Campeonato Carioca
- Copa do Brasil: Copa do Brasil
- Top goalscorer: League: Rafael Navarro (15); All: Rafael Navarro (16)

The 2021 season was the 117th in the history of Botafogo Football and Rowing Club and the second in a row in the second division of Brazilian football. It participated in the Série B, the Campeonato Carioca and the Copa do Brasil.

== Players ==
=== First-team squad ===
As of 16 September 2021

Note: Flags indicate national team as defined under FIFA eligibility rules; some limited exceptions apply. Players may hold more than one non-FIFA nationality.

No.	Pos.	Nation	Player
1	GK	PAR	Gatito Fernández (vice-captain)
2	DF	BRA	Kanu
3	DF	ARG	Joel Carli (captain)
4	DF	BRA	Gilvan
5	MF	BRA	Luís Oyama (on loan from Mirassol)
6	DF	BRA	Jonathan Silva (on loan from Almería)
7	DF	BRA	Rafael
8	MF	BRA	Ricardinho
9	FW	BRA	Rafael Moura
11	FW	BRA	Diego Gonçalves (on loan from Mirassol)
13	DF	BRA	Jonathan
14	FW	BRA	Chay
16	DF	BRA	Hugo
17	MF	BRA	Felipe Ferreira (on loan from Ferroviária)
20	DF	BRA	Daniel Borges (on loan from Mirassol)

No.	Pos.	Nation	Player
21	MF	BRA	Romildo
22	GK	BRA	Douglas Borges
23	MF	BRA	Barreto (on loan from Criciúma)
25	DF	BRA	Warley
29	GK	BRA	Diego Loureiro
31	FW	BRA	Ronald
33	MF	BRA	Pedro Castro (on loan from Tombense)
34	MF	BRA	Cesinha (on loan from Três Passos)
36	MF	BRA	Ênio
45	MF	BRA	Matheus Frizzo (on loan from Grêmio)
49	MF	BRA	Kayque
70	MF	BRA	Marco Antônio (on loan from Bahia)
88	DF	BRA	Guilherme Santos
90	FW	BRA	Matheus Nascimento
99	FW	BRA	Rafael Navarro

=== Reserve team ===
Note: Flags indicate national team as defined under FIFA eligibility rules; some limited exceptions apply. Players may hold more than one non-FIFA nationality.

No.	Pos.	Nation	Player
35	MF	BRA	Wendel
37	FW	BRA	Gabriel
38	DF	URU	Federico Barrandeguy
40	DF	BRA	Lucas Mezenga (on loan from Nova Iguaçu)
43	DF	BRA	Ewerton

No.	Pos.	Nation	Player
44	MF	BRA	Henrique
47	MF	BRA	Juninho
52	GK	BRA	Igo Gabriel (on loan from CSA)
—	FW	PER	Alexander Lecaros

=== Out on loan ===
Note: Flags indicate national team as defined under FIFA eligibility rules; some limited exceptions apply. Players may hold more than one non-FIFA nationality.

No.	Pos.	Nation	Player
—	DF	BRA	David Sousa (to Cercle Brugge until 31 December 2022)
—	DF	BRA	Marcelo Benevenuto (to Fortaleza until 31 December 2021)

No.	Pos.	Nation	Player
—	DF	BRA	Rafael Forster (to Juventude until 31 December 2021)
—	FW	BRA	Luiz Fernando (to Grêmio until 31 December 2021)

== Competitions ==
=== Overall record ===
Competition	First match	Last match	Starting round	Final position	Record							
Competition	First match	Last match	Starting round	Final position	Pld	W	D	L	GF	GA	GD	Win %
Série B	28 May 2021	28 November 2021	Matchday 1	Winners	38	20	10	8	56	31	+25	52.63
Total					38	20	10	8	56	31	+25	52.63

Source: Competitions

=== Campeonato Brasileiro Série B ===
==== League table ====
Pos	Team	Pld	W	D	L	GF	GA	GD	Pts	Promotion or relegation
1	Botafogo (C, P)	38	20	10	8	56	31	+25	70	Promotion to 2022 Campeonato Brasileiro Série A
2	Goiás (P)	38	17	14	7	48	31	+17	65	Promotion to 2022 Campeonato Brasileiro Série A
3	Coritiba (P)	38	18	10	10	49	35	+14	64	Promotion to 2022 Campeonato Brasileiro Série A
4	Avaí (P)	38	18	10	10	44	35	+9	64	Promotion to 2022 Campeonato Brasileiro Série A
5	CSA	38	18	8	12	48	33	+15	62	

Source: CBF
Rules for classification: 1) points; 2) wins; 3) goal difference; 4) goals scored; 5) head-to-head results (only between 2 teams); 6) fewest red cards; 7) fewest yellow cards; 8) drawing of lots.
(C) Champions; (P) Promoted

==== Results summary ====
Overall								Home						Away					
Pld	W	D	L	GF	GA	GD	Pts	W	D	L	GF	GA	GD	W	D	L	GF	GA	GD
38	20	10	8	56	31	+25	70	15	2	2	39	13	+26	5	8	6	17	18	−1

==== Results by round ====
Round	1	2	3	4	5	6	7	8	9	10	11	12	13	14	15	16	17	18	19	20	21	22	23	24	25	26	27	28	29	30	31	32	33	34	35	36	37	38
Ground	A	H	H	A	A	H	A	H	A	A	H	A	H	A	H	H	A	H	A	H	A	A	H	H	A	H	A	H	H	A	H	A	H	A	A	H	A	H
Result	D	W	W	D	L	W	L	W	D	L	D	L	L	W	W	W	L	W	D	W	W	W	W	W	L	W	D	L	W	D	W	D	W	W	D	W	W	D
Position	8	4	3	3	4	2	6	5	5	8	10	11	11	11	9	8	10	8	8	6	4	4	3	3	3	2	2	3	2	2	2	2	2	1	1	1	1	1

A = Away; H = Home; W = Win; D = Draw; L = Loss

==== Matches ====
28 May 2021 1	Vila Nova	1–1	Botafogo	Goiânia
--:-- UTC−3

5 June 2021 2	Botafogo	2–0	Coritiba	Rio de Janeiro
--:-- UTC−3				Stadium: Estádio Nilton Santos

13 June 2021 3	Botafogo	3–0	Remo	Rio de Janeiro
--:-- UTC−3				Stadium: Estádio Nilton Santos

17 June 2021 4	Londrina	2–2	Botafogo	Londrina
--:-- UTC−3

20 June 2021 5	Náutico	3–1	Botafogo	Recife
--:-- UTC−3

26 June 2021 7	Sampaio Corrêa	2–0	Botafogo	São Luís
--:-- UTC−3

30 June 2021 8	Botafogo	1–0	Vitória	Rio de Janeiro
21:30 UTC−3				Stadium: Estádio Nilton Santos

3 July 2021 9	Avaí	1–1	Botafogo	Florianópolis
--:-- UTC−3

6 July 2021 10	CRB	2–1	Botafogo	Maceió
--:-- UTC−3

10 July 2021 11	Botafogo	3–3	Cruzeiro	Rio de Janeiro
				Stadium: Estádio Nilton Santos

18 July 2021 12	Brusque	2–1	Botafogo	Brusque
--:-- UTC−3

21 July 2021 13	Botafogo	0–2	Goiás	Rio de Janeiro
				Stadium: Estádio Nilton Santos

24 July 2021 14	Confiança	0–1	Botafogo	Aracaju
--:-- UTC−3

27 July 2021 6	Botafogo	2–0	CSA	Rio de Janeiro
21:30 UTC−3				Stadium: Estádio Nilton Santos
