= Anthoni (footballer) =

Brazilian footballer

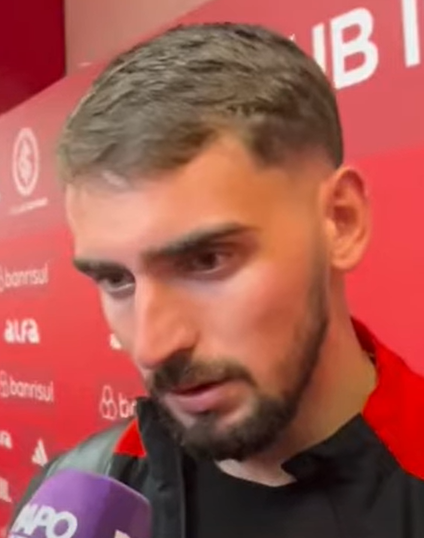
- Anthoni in 2025

Personal information
- Full name: Anthoni Spier Souza
- Date of birth: 23 January 2002 (age 24)
- Place of birth: Canela, Brazil
- Height: 1.93 m (6 ft 4 in)
- Position: Goalkeeper

Team information
- Current team: Internacional
- Number: 12

Youth career
- Internacional

Senior career*
Years	Team	Apps	(Gls)
2024–	Internacional	51	(0)
- * Club domestic league appearances and goals as of 8 April 2026

Anthoni Spier Souza (born 23 January 2002) simply known as Anthoni, is a Brazilian professional footballer who plays as a goalkeeper for Internacional.

== Club career ==
Anthoni made his debut in the professional team of Internacional by entering on the 2nd time of team's first match of the year, on 2024 Campeonato Gaúcho, replacing the injured Ivan (who was debuting on Internacional as well, replacing an injured Sergio Rochet), against Avenida.

Due to both injuries of Ivan and Rochet, Anthoni became the first-choice goalkeeper for the beginning of 2024.

In 2025, Anthoni became the first-choice goalkeeper after a new injury from Rochet. Anthoni played all the matches from Campeonato Gaúcho in 2025 and won the title for Internacional undefeated.

== Career statistics ==
As of match played 20 November 2025

Appearances and goals by club, season and competition
Club	Season	League			State league		Cup		Continental		Other		Total	
Club	Season	Division	Apps	Goals	Apps	Goals	Apps	Goals	Apps	Goals	Apps	Goals	Apps	Goals
Internacional	2021	Série A	0	0	0	0	0	0	0	0	—		0	0
Internacional	2022	Série A	0	0	—		—		0	0	—		0	0
Internacional	2023	Série A	0	0	0	0	0	0	0	0	—		0	0
Internacional	2024	Série A	2	0	13	0	4	0	0	0	—		19	0
Internacional	2025	Série A	18	0	12	0	2	0	6	0	—		38	0
Career total			20	0	25	0	6	0	6	0	0	0	67	0

== Honours ==
Internacional

- Campeonato Gaúcho: 2025
- Recopa Gaúcha: 2026
