= Clayton Sampaio =

Brazilian footballer

Personal information
- Full name: Clayton Sampaio Pereira
- Date of birth: 4 April 2000 (age 26)
- Place of birth: Santos, Brazil
- Height: 1.87 m (6 ft 2 in)
- Position: Centre-back

Team information
- Current team: Fakel Voronezh (on loan from Internacional)
- Number: 40

Youth career
- 2015–2018: Santos
- 2019: EC São Bernardo

Senior career*
Years	Team	Apps	(Gls)
2019–2023	EC São Bernardo	0	(0)
2019–2020	→ Famalicão (loan)	0	(0)
2020–2021	→ Felgueiras 1932 (loan)	22	(1)
2021–2022	→ Real Massamá (loan)	22	(0)
2022–2023	→ Nacional (loan)	32	(3)
2023–2024	AVS	35	(0)
2024–	Internacional	24	(0)
2026–	→ Fakel Voronezh (loan)	9	(1)
- * Club domestic league appearances and goals as of 21 November 2026

Clayton Sampaio Pereira (born 4 April 2000), known as Clayton Sampaio or just Clayton, is a Brazilian professional footballer who plays as a centre-back for Russian Premier League club Fakel Voronezh on loan from Internacional.

== Career ==
Born in Santos, São Paulo, Clayton represented the youth sides of Santos and EC São Bernardo. In 2019, after finishing his formation, he moved abroad and joined Portuguese side Famalicão, but only played for their under-23 team.

On 18 August 2020, Clayton was announced at Campeonato de Portugal club Felgueiras 1932. In July of the following year, he moved to Liga 3 side Real Massamá.

On 9 July 2022, still owned by São Bernardo, Clayton joined Nacional of the Liga Portugal 2 on a two-year loan deal. An undisputed starter, he signed a permanent deal with fellow second division side AVS on 6 July 2023.

After being a first-choice during the season as the club achieved promotion to Primeira Liga, Clayton made his top tier debut on 10 August 2024, starting in a 1–1 home draw against former side Nacional. Late in the month, he returned to his home country and signed a four-and-a-half-year contract with Internacional in the Série A.

On 25 August 2026, Clayton was loaned by Fakel Voronezh in Russia, with an option to buy.

== Career statistics ==
As of 21 November 2026

Club	Season	League			Cup		Continental		Other		Total	
Club	Season	Division	Apps	Goals	Apps	Goals	Apps	Goals	Apps	Goals	Apps	Goals
Felgueiras 1932 (loan)	2020–21	Campeonato de Portugal	22	1	2	1	—		—		24	2
Real Massamá (loan)	2021–22	Liga 3	22	0	3	0	—		—		25	0
Nacional (loan)	2022–23	Liga Portugal 2	32	3	7	1	—		3 (Note: Appearances in Taça da Liga)	0	42	4
AVS	2023–24	Liga Portugal 2	33	0	2	0	—		6 (Note: Four appearances in Taça da Liga, two appearances in promotion play-offs)	0	41	0
AVS	2024–25	Primeira Liga	2	0	—		—		—		2	0
AVS	Total		35	0	2	0	0	0	6	0	43	0
Internacional	2024	Série A	8	0	—		—		—		8	0
Internacional	2025	Série A	11	0	0	0	1 (Note: Appearance in Copa Libertadores)	0	1 (Note: Appearance in Campeonato Gaúcho)	0	13	0
Internacional	2026	Série A	0	0	0	0	—		5 (Note: Four appearances in Campeonato Gaúcho, one appearance in Recopa Gaúcha)	0	5	0
Internacional	Total		19	0	0	0	1	0	6	0	26	0
Fakel Voronezh (loan)	2026–27	Russian Premier League	9	1	3	0	—		—		12	1
Career total			139	5	17	2	1	0	15	0	172	7

== Honours ==
Internacional

- Campeonato Gaúcho: 2025
- Recopa Gaúcha: 2026
