= Rio das Pedras, São Paulo =

Rio das Pedras Município de Rio das Pedras
- Municipality
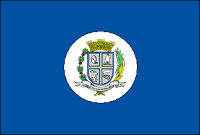
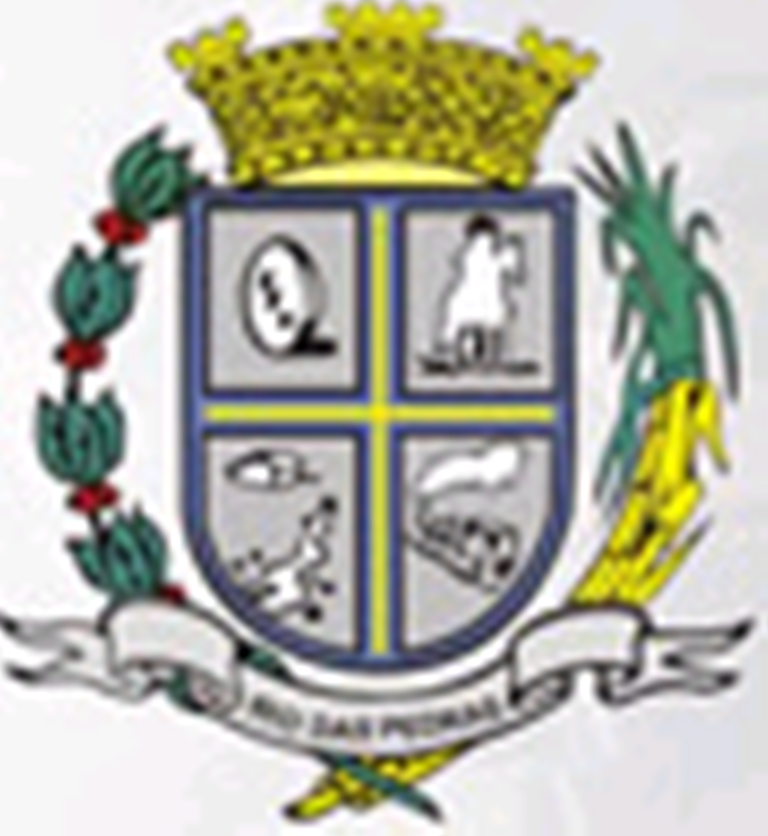
- Flag Coat of arms

- Location in São Paulo state

- Location in Brazil
- Coordinates: 22°50′34″S 47°36′21″W
- Country: Brazil
- Region: Southeast
- State: São Paulo
- Mesoregion: Piracicaba
- Microregion: Piracicaba
- Established: 10 July, 1894

Government
  - Mayor: Júlio Cesar Barros Ayres (PPS)

Area
  - Total: 226.657 km^{2} (87.513 sq mi)
- Elevation: 625 m (2,051 ft)

Population (2020)
  - Total: 35,738
  - Density: 157.67/km^{2} (408.37/sq mi)
- Time zone: UTC−3 (BRT)

Rio das Pedras is a municipality in the State of São Paulo, Brazil, located at the Microregion of Piracicaba. As of 2020, it has 35,738 people and an area of 226.657 square kilometers.

== Media ==
In telecommunications, the city was served by Telecomunicações de São Paulo. In July 1998, this company was acquired by Telefónica, which adopted the Vivo brand in 2012. The company is currently an operator of cell phones, fixed lines, internet (fiber optics/4G) and television (satellite and cable).

== Religion ==
Christianity is present in the city as follows:

=== Catholic Church ===
The Catholic church in the municipality is part of the Roman Catholic Diocese of Piracicaba.

=== Protestant Church ===
The most diverse evangelical beliefs are present in the city, mainly Pentecostal, including the Assemblies of God in Brazil (the largest evangelical church in the country), Christian Congregation in Brazil, among others. These denominations are growing more and more throughout Brazil.

== Notable people ==
- Ivan, footballer

== See also ==
- List of municipalities in São Paulo
