= Rayan (footballer, born 2006) =

Brazilian footballer (born 2006)

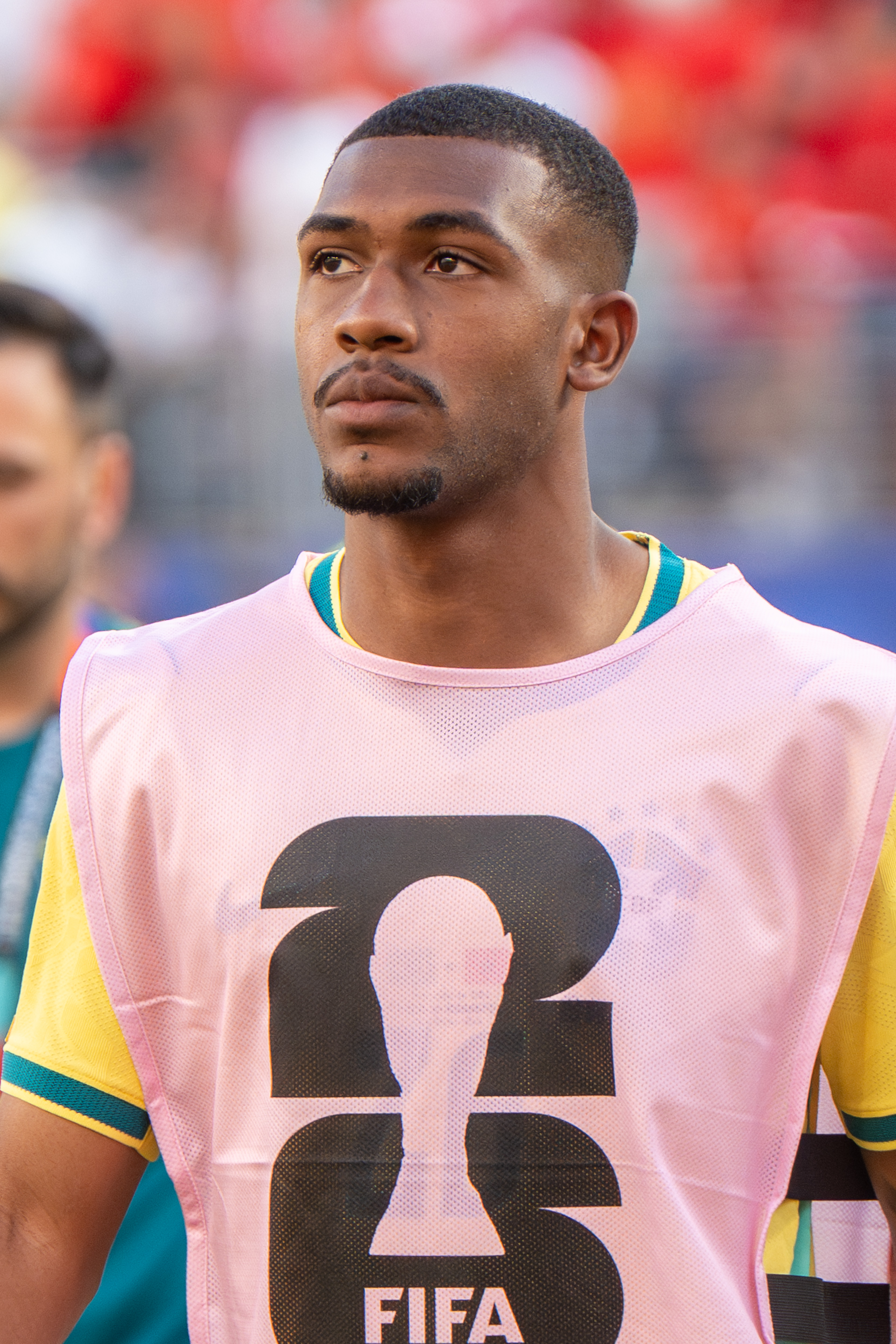
- Rayan with Brazil in 2026

Personal information
- Full name: Rayan Vitor Simplício Rocha
- Date of birth: 3 August 2006 (age 20)
- Place of birth: Rio de Janeiro, Brazil
- Height: 1.87 m (6 ft 2 in)
- Positions: Right winger; forward

Team information
- Current team: Bournemouth
- Number: 37

Youth career
- 2012–2023: Vasco da Gama

Senior career*
Years	Team	Apps	(Gls)
2023–2026	Vasco da Gama	74	(19)
2026–	Bournemouth	25	(6)

International career^{‡}
2023	Brazil U17	14	(8)
2024–	Brazil U20	11	(2)
2026–	Brazil	9	(3)
Medal record
Men's football
Representing Brazil
South American U-20 Championship
Winner	2025 Venezuela
- * Club domestic league appearances and goals as of 04:06, 15 November 2026 (UTC) ‡ National team caps and goals as of 19:30, 17 November 2026 (UTC)

Rayan Vitor Simplício Rocha (born 3 August 2006), known simply as Rayan (Brazilian Portuguese pronunciation: [ʁaˈjɐ̃]), is a Brazilian professional footballer who plays as a right winger or forward for Premier League club Bournemouth and the Brazil national team.

== Club career ==
=== Vasco da Gama ===
Born in Rio de Janeiro, Rayan joined Vasco da Gama at the age of six. He established a name for himself as a prolific goal-scorer, scoring 280 goals by the age of eleven. He continued this form into Vasco's under-17 team, scoring 29 goals in 34 games in 2022, catching the eye of Spanish side Barcelona.

In 2023, Rayan made his professional debut at age 16, becoming the youngest player to play for Vasco da Gama's professional team in the 21st century. He came on as a substitute in the second half of the 1–1 draw against Audax in the Campeonato Carioca. In the Campeonato Brasileiro Série A, he scored his first goal for the professional team in a 2–1 defeat against Internacional at Estádio Beira-Rio. In 2025, Rayan gained more playing time in the starting lineup with the arrival of coach Fernando Diniz. He helped Vasco reach the final of the Copa do Brasil, scoring one goal and initiating the play that led to the other goal in the semi-finals against rivals Fluminense. Rayan finished the season receiving the Best Newcomer Award for the 2025 Campeonato Brasileiro Série A, and was named to the Team of the Year in the 2025 Copa do Brasil.

On 12 December 2025, Rayan signed a new contract with Vasco da Gama until December 2028.

=== Bournemouth ===
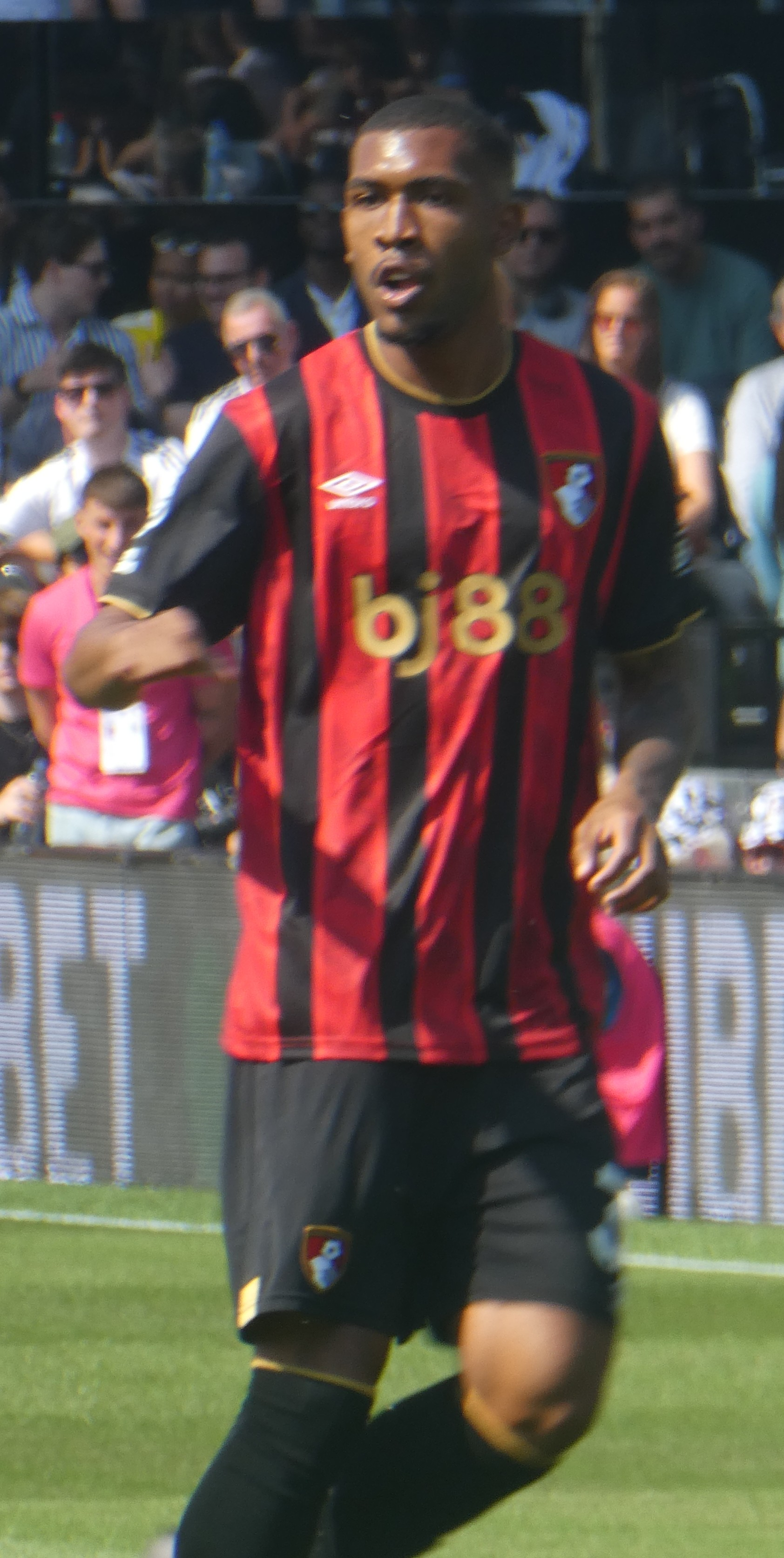
Rayan with Bournemouth in 2026

On 27 January 2026, Rayan signed for Premier League club Bournemouth until June 2031. The transfer was reported to be worth £24.7 million, including £5.6 million in potential add-ons. He made his debut as a substitute in an 2–0 away win at Wolverhampton Wanderers on 31 January, assisting Alex Scott for Bournemouth's second goal. He made his first start for the club the following week on 7 February, where he scored the equalising goal against Aston Villa in a 1–1 home draw. His second goal came in the next match on 10 February, scoring a headed goal to help secure a 2–1 away win against Everton. Hence, he became the third teenager in Premier League history to register a goal or assist in each of his first three appearances, following Robbie Keane in 1999 and Anthony Martial in 2015.

With goals against Leeds United, Crystal Palace and Fulham on 22 April, 3 May and 9 May 2026 respectively, Rayan became the sixteenth teenager in Premier League history to score in three consecutive matches, and, with teammate Eli Junior Kroupi achieving the same feat earlier in the season, the duo made Bournemouth the first club in Premier League history to have two teenagers score in three consecutive matches in a single season.

== International career ==
Rayan was called up to the Brazil under-17 squad for friendlies against Chile and Paraguay in 2022; he scored twice in four games.

On 16 March 2026, Rayan earned his first call-up to the Brazil national team for friendlies against France and Croatia, debuting against the latter.

On 18 May 2026, Rayan was selected as part of Carlo Ancelotti's 26-man squad for the 2026 FIFA World Cup. He scored his first goal for the senior squad in a 6–2 friendly win against Panama on 31 May as part of the warm-up fixtures. He made his World Cup debut on 20 June as a substitute in Brazil's second group stage match, a 3–0 win against Haiti, replacing the injured Raphinha. He made his full debut the following game in another 3–0 win against Scotland on 24 June, becoming the first teenager to start for Brazil in a World Cup match since Marco Antonio in 1970.

== Personal life ==
Rayan's father, Valkmar, also played for Vasco da Gama, representing the club as a defender between 1995 and 2001.

== Career statistics ==
=== Club ===
As of match played 8 November 2026

Appearances and goals by club, season and competition
Club	Season	League			State league (Note: Includes Campeonato Carioca)		National cup (Note: Includes Copa do Brasil)		League cup (Note: Includes EFL Cup)		Continental		Total	
Club	Season	Division	Apps	Goals	Apps	Goals	Apps	Goals	Apps	Goals	Apps	Goals	Apps	Goals
Vasco da Gama	2023	Série A	6	1	2	0	0	0	—		—		8	1
Vasco da Gama	2024	Série A	24	1	4	1	5	0	—		—		33	2
Vasco da Gama	2025	Série A	34	14	3	0	12	5	—		8 (Note: Appearances in Copa Sudamericana)	1	57	20
Vasco da Gama	2026	Série A	—		1	2	—		—		—		1	2
Vasco da Gama	Total		64	16	10	3	17	5	—		8	1	99	25
Bournemouth	2025–26	Premier League	15	5	—		—		—		—		15	5
Bournemouth	2026–27	Premier League	10	1	—		0	0	2	1	4 (Note: Appearances in UEFA Europa League)	3	16	5
Bournemouth	Total		25	6	—		0	0	2	1	4	3	31	10
Career total			89	22	10	3	17	5	2	1	12	4	130	35

=== International ===
As of match played 17 November 2026

Appearances and goals by national team and year
National team	Year	Apps	Goals
Brazil	2026	9	3
Total		9	3

Scores and results list Brazil's goal tally first.

List of international goals scored by Rayan
No.	Date	Venue	Cap	Opponent	Score	Result	Competition
1	31 May 2026	Estádio do Maracanã, Rio de Janeiro, Brazil	2	Panama	3–1	6–2	Friendly
2	25 September 2026	Queensland Country Bank Stadium, Townsville, Australia	7	Australia	1–1	1–1	Friendly
3	17 November 2026	National Stadium, Kallang, Singapore	9	Singapore	6–0	7–0	Friendly

== Honours ==
Vasco da Gama

- Copa do Brasil runner-up: 2025

Brazil U20

- South American U-20 Championship: 2025

Individual

- Campeonato Brasileiro Série A Best Newcomer: 2025
- Copa do Brasil top scorer: 2025 (5 goals)
