= Yago Noal =

Brazilian footballer (born 2007)

Personal information
- Full name: Yago Eduardo Noal Lopes
- Date of birth: 5 February 2007 (age 19)
- Place of birth: Porto Alegre, Brazil
- Height: 1.71 m (5 ft 7 in)
- Position: Attacking midfielder

Team information
- Current team: Internacional
- Number: 37

Youth career
- 2016–: Internacional

Senior career*
Years	Team	Apps	(Gls)
2025–	Internacional	6	(0)
- * Club domestic league appearances and goals as of 13 December 2025

Yago Eduardo Noal Lopes (born 5 February 2007) is a Brazilian professional footballer who plays as an attacking midfielder for Internacional.

== Career ==
Born in Porto Alegre, Rio Grande do Sul, Noal joined Internacional's youth sides in 2016, initially for the futsal side. In 2021, however, he suffered a back injury which kept him sidelined for nearly a year.

Back to action in 2023, Noal became an important unit for the under-20 squad in the following year, and renewed his link until 2028 on 30 July 2024. He made his first team debut on 25 January 2025, coming on as a late substitute for Alan Patrick in a 2–0 Campeonato Gaúcho home win over Juventude; aged 17 years, 11 months and 12 days, he became the fifth-youngest player to debut for the club.

== Career statistics ==
As of 28 May 2025

Appearances and goals by club, season and competition
Club	Season	League			State League		National Cup		Continental		Other		Total	
Club	Season	Division	Apps	Goals	Apps	Goals	Apps	Goals	Apps	Goals	Apps	Goals	Apps	Goals
Internacional	2025	Série A	1	0	4	0	0	0	0	0	—		5	0
Career total			1	0	4	0	0	0	0	0	0	0	5	0

== Honours ==
Internacional

- Campeonato Gaúcho: 2025
