= Victor Gabriel =

Brazilian footballer

Personal information
- Full name: Victor Gabriel da Conceição Ribeiro
- Date of birth: 28 April 2004 (age 22)
- Place of birth: Tuntum, Brazil
- Height: 1.85 m (6 ft 1 in)
- Position: Centre-back

Team information
- Current team: Internacional
- Number: 41

Youth career
- Sport Recife
- 2024: → Internacional (loan)

Senior career*
Years	Team	Apps	(Gls)
2021–2025	Sport Recife	9	(0)
2024–2025	→ Internacional (loan)	26	(3)
2026–	Internacional	15	(0)
- * Club domestic league appearances and goals as of 8 April 2026

Victor Gabriel da Conceição Ribeiro (born 28 April 2004), known as just Victor Gabriel, is a Brazilian professional soccer player who plays as a defender for Internacional.

== Career statistics ==
As of match played 12 May 2025

Appearances and goals by club, season and competition
Club	Season	League			State League		Copa do Brasil		Continental		Other		Total	
Club	Season	Division	Apps	Goals	Apps	Goals	Apps	Goals	Apps	Goals	Apps	Goals	Apps	Goals
Sport Recife	2021	Série A	1	0	1 (Note: Appearance(s) in Campeonato Pernambucano)	0	0	0	—		1 (Note: Appearance(s) in Copa do Nordeste)	0	3	0
Sport Recife	2022	Série B	0	0	3	0	0	0	—		0	0	3	0
Sport Recife	2023	Série B	4	0	0	0	0	0	—		0	0	4	0
Sport Recife	2024	Série B	0	0	0	0	0	0	—		0	0	0	0
Sport Recife	2025	Série A	0	0	0	0	0	0	—		0	0	0	0
Sport Recife	Total		5	0	4	0	0	0	—		1	0	10	0
Internacional (loan)	2024	Série A	0	0	0	0	0	0	0	0	—		0	0
Internacional (loan)	2025	Série A	3	2	12 (Note: Appearance(s) in Campeonato Gaúcho)	1	1	0	2 (Note: Appearance(s) in Copa Libertadores)	0	—		18	3
Internacional (loan)	Total		3	2	12	1	1	0	2	0	—		18	3
Career total			8	2	16	1	1	0	2	0	1	0	28	3

== Honours ==
Internacional

- Campeonato Gaúcho: 2025
