= Bruno Gomes (footballer, born 2001) =

Brazilian footballer (born 2001)

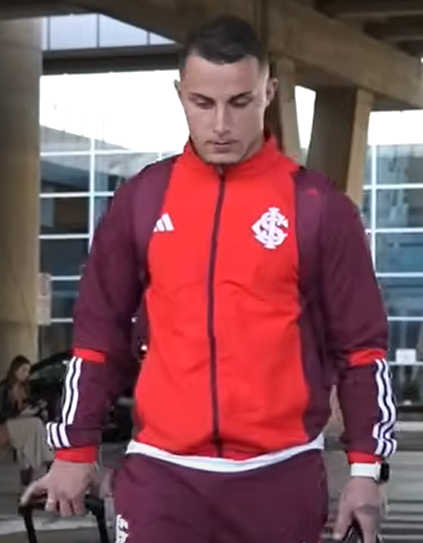

Personal information
- Full name: Bruno Gomes da Silva Clevelário
- Date of birth: 4 April 2001 (age 25)
- Place of birth: Rio de Janeiro, Brazil
- Height: 1.75 m (5 ft 9 in)
- Position: Defensive midfielder

Team information
- Current team: Internacional
- Number: 15

Youth career
- 2015–2019: Vasco da Gama

Senior career*
Years	Team	Apps	(Gls)
2019–2021	Vasco da Gama	64	(2)
2022	Internacional	1	(0)
2022	→ Coritiba (loan)	18	(1)
2023	Coritiba	41	(3)
2024–	Internacional	68	(1)
- * Club domestic league appearances and goals as of 8 April 2026

Bruno Gomes da Silva Clevelário (born on 4 April 2001), better known as Bruno Gomes, is a Brazilian footballer who plays as a right-back, defensive midfielder, and central midfielder for Internacional.

== Club career ==
Bruno Gomes was revealed in the youth ranks of Vasco da Gama, moving up to the professional team at just 18 years old. At the São Januário team, he made 74 appearances and scored two goals. In 2022, he moved to Sport Club Internacional on a permanent basis which had Zé Gabriel transferred to Vasco as well.

After only one match played with Internacional, Gomes was loaned to Coritiba until the end of 2022. He later signed permanently with Coxa for another year.

In 2024, with the help of Argentine coach Eduardo Coudet, Bruno Gomes was hired again by Inter in a 4-year contract, owning 75% of the athlete's rights. After the departure of right-backs Bustos and Mallo, Bruno Gomes started playing in the position by coach Roger Machado, ending 2024 as a starter on the team.

== Career statistics ==
As of 15 November 2024.

Club	Season	League			State league		Cup		Continental		Other		Total	
Club	Season	Division	Apps	Goals	Apps	Goals	Apps	Goals	Apps	Goals	Apps	Goals	Apps	Goals
Vasco da Gama	2019	Série A	8	1	—		0	0	—		—		8	1
Vasco da Gama	2020	Série A	23	0	3	0	2	0	2 (Note: Appearance(s) in Copa Sudamericana)	0	—		30	0
Vasco da Gama	2021	Série B	21	0	9	1	6	0	—		—		36	1
Vasco da Gama	Total		52	1	12	1	8	0	2	0	—		74	2
Internacional	2022	Série A	0	0	1	0	0	0	0	0	—		1	0
Coritiba	2022	Série A	18	1	—		0	0	—		—		18	1
Coritiba	2023	Série A	29	3	12	0	4	0	—		—		45	3
Coritiba	Total		47	4	12	0	4	0	—		—		63	4
Internacional	2024	Série A	26	1	5	0	4	0	4	1	—		39	2
Career total			125	6	30	1	16	0	6	1	0	0	177	8

== Honours ==
Internacional

- Campeonato Gaúcho: 2025
