= Luís Oyama =

Brazilian footballer (born 1997)

Personal information
- Full name: Luís Felipe Oyama
- Date of birth: 30 January 1997 (age 29)
- Place of birth: São José do Rio Preto, Brazil
- Height: 1.71 m (5 ft 7 in)
- Position: Midfielder

Team information
- Current team: Novorizontino
- Number: 6

Youth career
- 2013–2016: Mirassol

Senior career*
Years	Team	Apps	(Gls)
2015–2022	Mirassol	50	(1)
2019	→ Atibaia (loan)	7	(3)
2020	→ Ponte Preta (loan)	21	(0)
2021	→ Botafogo (loan)	31	(2)
2022–2025	Botafogo	16	(0)
2022–2023	→ RWDM (loan)	23	(4)
2023	→ Goiás (loan)	9	(1)
2024	→ Juventude (loan)	28	(2)
2025	→ Novorizontino (loan)	47	(2)
2026–	Novorizontino	46	(4)
- * Club domestic league appearances and goals as of 17 November 2026

Luís Felipe Oyama (born 30 January 1997) is a Brazilian footballer who plays as a midfielder for Novorizontino.

== Club career ==
Oyama was born in São José do Rio Preto, São Paulo, and joined Mirassol's youth setup in 2013, after spending some time playing tennis. He made his first team debut on 24 July 2015, coming on as a second-half substitute in a 1–1 home draw against Rio Preto, for the year's Copa Paulista.

Oyama scored his first senior goal on 30 August 2017, netting the opener in a 2–2 away draw against XV de Piracicaba, also for the state cup. Sparingly used, he was loaned to Atibaia in February 2019.

After returning from loan from Atibaia, Oyama was regularly used in the 2020 Campeonato Paulista, as his side reached the semifinals of the competition. On 6 July 2020, he joined Série B side Ponte Preta on loan until the end of the campaign.

== Personal life ==
Luís Oyama is of Japanese descent, his paternal grandparents were born in Japan and emigrated to Brazil. His maternal great-grandmother was also born in Japan and emigrated to Brazil.

== Career statistics ==
As of 6 July 2023.

Club	Season	League			State League		Cup		Continental		Other		Total	
Club	Season	Division	Apps	Goals	Apps	Goals	Apps	Goals	Apps	Goals	Apps	Goals	Apps	Goals
Mirassol	2015	Paulista A2	—		0	0	—		—		3 (Note: Appearance(s) in Copa Paulista)	0	3	0
Mirassol	2016	Paulista A2	—		2	0	—		—		16	0	18	0
Mirassol	2017	Paulista	—		2	0	—		—		17	1	19	1
Mirassol	2018	Série D	6	0	8	1	—		—		1	0	15	1
Mirassol	2019	Paulista	—		0	0	—		—		0	0	0	0
Mirassol	2020	Paulista	—		10	0	—		—		—		10	0
Mirassol	2021	Série C	0	0	10	0	1	0	—		—		11	0
Mirassol	2022	Série C	0	0	12	0	2	0	—		—		14	0
Mirassol	Total		6	0	44	1	3	0	—		37	1	90	2
Atibaia (loan)	2019	Paulista A2	—		7	3	—		—		—		7	3
Ponte Preta (loan)	2020	Série B	20	0	—		—		—		—		20	0
Botafogo (loan)	2021	Série B	31	2	—		—		—		—		31	2
Botafogo	2022	Série A	16	0	—		—		—		—		16	0
RWDM (loan)	2022–23	Challenger Pro League	23	4	—		1	0	—		—		24	4
Goiás (loan)	2023	Série A	0	0	—		—		—		—		0	0
Career total			96	6	51	4	4	0	0	0	37	1	188	11

== Honours ==
Botafogo

- Campeonato Brasileiro Série B: 2021

Novorizontino

- Campeonato Brasileiro Série B: 2026
