= Ivan (footballer, born 1997) =

Brazilian footballer

Ivan Quaresma
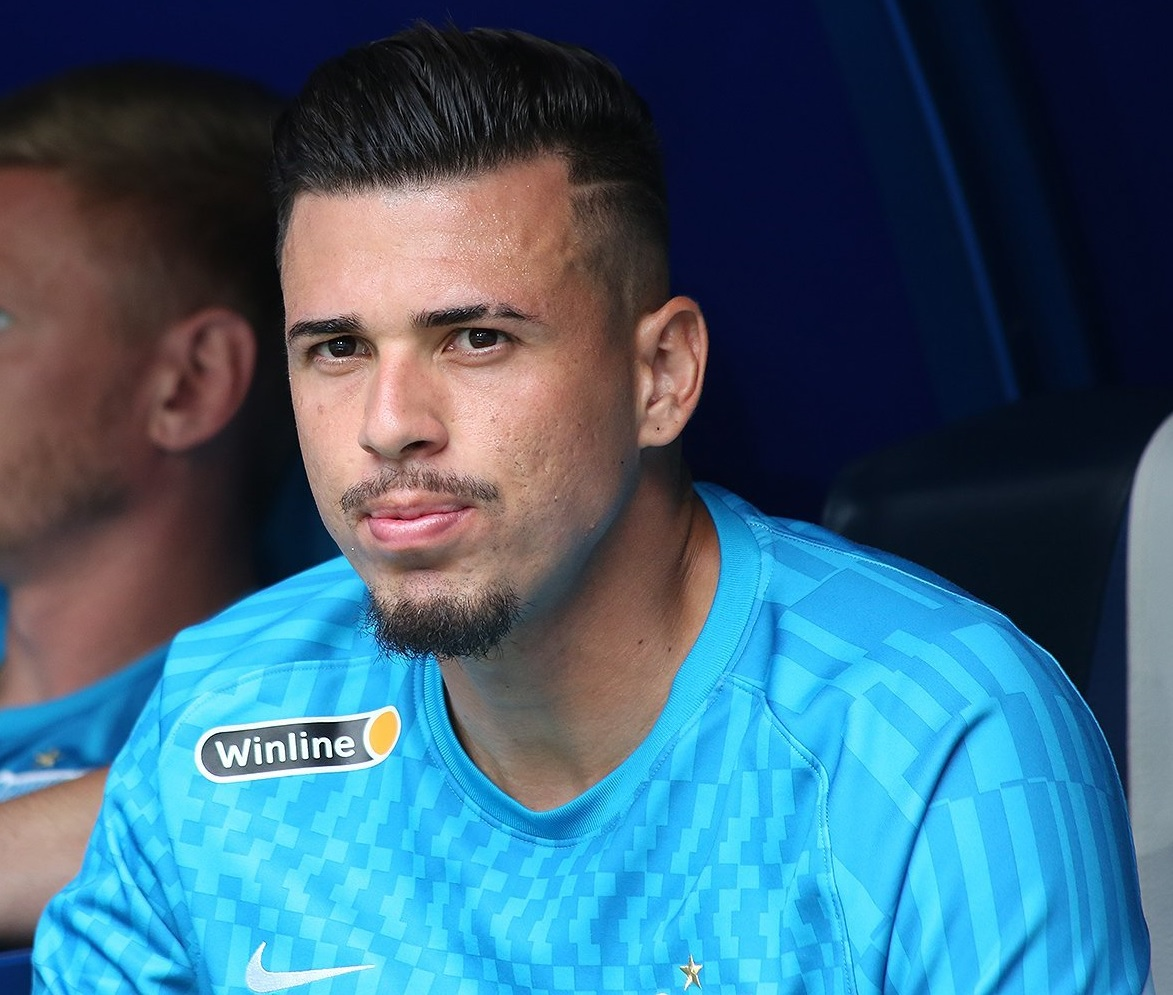
- Ivan with Zenit St. Petersburg in 2022

Personal information
- Full name: Ivan Quaresma da Silva
- Date of birth: 7 February 1997 (age 29)
- Place of birth: Rio das Pedras, São Paulo, Brazil
- Height: 1.96 m (6 ft 5 in)
- Position: Goalkeeper

Team information
- Current team: Internacional
- Number: 12

Youth career
- Guarani
- 2013–2017: Ponte Preta

Senior career*
Years	Team	Apps	(Gls)
2016–2022	Ponte Preta	163	(0)
2022–2023	Corinthians	3	(0)
2022	→ Zenit St. Petersburg (loan)	0	(0)
2023	→ Vasco da Gama (loan)	3	(0)
2024–	Internacional	8	(0)

International career^{‡}
2019–2020	Brazil U23	11	(0)
- * Club domestic league appearances and goals as of 13 December 2025 ‡ National team caps and goals as of 2 July 2021

Ivan Quaresma da Silva (born 7 February 1997), commonly known as Ivan, is a Brazilian professional footballer who plays as a goalkeeper for Internacional.

== Club career ==
Born in Rio das Pedras, São Paulo, Ivan joined Ponte Preta's youth setup in 2013, from fierce rivals Guarani. He made his first team – and Série A – debut on 11 December 2016, coming on as a late substitute for Aranha in a 2–0 home defeat of Coritiba.

Promoted to the main squad ahead of the 2017 season, Ivan was mainly a third-choice behind Aranha and João Carlos, as his side suffered relegation. For the 2018 campaign, he became an undisputed starter, and renewed his contract until 2023 on 4 April 2018.

On 29 June 2022, Russian champions FC Zenit Saint Petersburg announced an agreement with Corinthians under which Ivan and Gustavo Mantuan move on loan to Zenit and Yuri Alberto would be loaned in the opposite direction. On 10 January 2023, the loan was terminated early as a part of the permanent transfer of Yuri Alberto.

== International career ==
In May 2019, Ivan was called up by manager André Jardine for Brazil under-23 squad for the 2019 Toulon Tournament. He was a starter in the competition, playing in four of the five matches as his side was crowned champions. He was also a starter at the 2020 CONMEBOL Olympic Qualifying Championship, in which Brazil finished at 2nd place and clinched a spot for the 2020 Tokyo Olympics.

On 16 August 2019, Ivan was called up to the full side by manager Tite, for friendlies against Colombia and Peru.

== Career statistics ==
As of match played 20 November 2025

Appearances and goals by club, season and competition
Club	Season	League			National Cup (Note: Includes Copa do Brasil, Russian Cup)		State League		Continental		Other		Total	
Club	Season	Division	Apps	Goals	Apps	Goals	Apps	Goals	Apps	Goals	Apps	Goals	Apps	Goals
Ponte Preta	2016	Série A	1	0	0	0	0	0	—		—		1	0
Ponte Preta	2017	Série A	0	0	0	0	0	0	0	0	—		0	0
Ponte Preta	2018	Série B	38	0	8	0	16	0	—		—		62	0
Ponte Preta	2019	Série B	29	0	1	0	13	0	—		—		43	0
Ponte Preta	2020	Série B	18	0	5	0	9	0	—		—		32	0
Ponte Preta	2021	Série B	26	0	0	0	0	0	—		—		26	0
Ponte Preta	Total		112	0	14	0	38	0	—		—		164	0
Corinthians	2022	Série A	0	0	2	0	0	0	1	0	—		3	0
Zenit Saint Petersburg (loan)	2022–23	Russian Premier League	0	0	4	0	—		—		—		4	0
Vasco da Gama (loan)	2023	Série A	0	0	0	0	3	0	0	0	0	0	3	0
Internacional	2024	Série A	0	0	1	0	0	0	0	0	—		1	0
Internacional	2025	Série A	7	0	0	0	0	0	0	0	—		7	0
Internacional	Total		7	0	1	0	0	0	0	0	—		8	0
Career total			119	0	21	0	41	0	1	0	0	0	182	0

== Honours ==
Ponte Preta

Campeonato Paulista do Interior: 2018

International

Brazil U23 Toulon Tournament: 2019

Internacional

- Campeonato Gaúcho: 2025
