= 2023 Sport Club Internacional season =

Internacional
2023 season
- President: Alessandro Barcellos
- Manager: Mano Menezes (until 17 July); Eduardo Coudet (since 19 July)
- Stadium: Beira-Rio
- Campeonato Brasileiro Série A: 9th
- Campeonato Gaúcho: Semi-finals
- Copa Libertadores: Semi-finals
- Copa do Brasil: Round of 16
- Top goalscorer: League: Enner Valencia (9); All: Alan Patrick (16)
- Highest home attendance: 50,479 vs River Plate (8 August 2023)
- Lowest home attendance: 10,812 vs São José (16 February 2023)
- Biggest win: 7–1 vs Santos (22 October 2023)
- Biggest defeat: 0–3 vs Palmeiras (11 November 2023)
Home colours	Away colours	Third colours

The 2023 season was Sport Club Internacional's 113th season in existence. As well as the Campeonato Brasileiro Série A, the club competed in the Copa do Brasil, the Campeonato Gaúcho and the Copa Libertadores.

== First team ==
As of 7 December 2023

Note: Flags indicate national team as defined under FIFA eligibility rules; some limited exceptions apply. Players may hold more than one non-FIFA nationality.

No.	Pos.	Nation	Player
1	GK	BRA	Keiller
2	DF	ESP	Hugo Mallo
4	DF	BRA	Rodrigo Moledo
6	DF	BRA	Renê
8	FW	BRA	Bruno Henrique
9	FW	BRA	Luiz Adriano
10	MF	BRA	Alan Patrick (captain)
11	FW	BEL	Wanderson
12	GK	BRA	Emerson Júnior
14	FW	URU	Carlos de Pena
13	FW	ECU	Enner Valencia
15	MF	BRA	Lucas Ramos
16	DF	ARG	Fabricio Bustos
17	MF	BRA	Gustavo Campanharo
20	MF	CHI	Charles Aránguiz
21	DF	BRA	Igor Gomes
22	DF	COL	Nico Hernández
23	MF	BRA	Gabriel

No.	Pos.	Nation	Player
24	GK	BRA	Anthoni
25	DF	ARG	Gabriel Mercado
26	MF	BRA	Estêvão
27	MF	BRA	Maurício
28	FW	BRA	Pedro Henrique
29	DF	BRA	Dalbert
30	MF	USA	Johnny
33	GK	URU	Sergio Rochet
36	DF	BRA	Thauan Lara
38	FW	BRA	Jean Dias
40	MF	BRA	Rômulo (on loan from Athletic-MG)
41	MF	BRA	Matheus Dias
42	FW	BRA	Gabriel Barros
44	DF	BRA	Vitão (on loan from Shakhtar Donetsk)
45	FW	BRA	Lucca
50	DF	BRA	João Dalla Corte

== Transfers ==
=== In ===
Date	Pos.	No.	Player	From	Fee	Ref.
1 January 2023	FW	11	(Belgium) Wanderson (Note: Loaned by FC Krasnodar during the 2022 season.)	(Russia) FC Krasnodar	€4,500,000	
26 January 2023	MF	33	(Brazil) Gabriel Baralhas	(Brazil) Atlético-GO	€900,000	
22 February 2023	FW	9	(Brazil) Luiz Adriano	(Turkey) Antalyaspor	Free	
23 February 2023	DF	22	(Colombia) Nico Hernández	(Brazil) Athletico-PR	Free (Note: Athletico, Internacional and the player will share his economic rights as part of the deal.)	
2 April 2023	MF	20	(Chile) Charles Aránguiz (Note: Had his arrival anticipated after negotiations with Bayer Leverkusen)	(Germany) Bayer Leverkusen	End of Contract	
3 April 2023	MF	17	(Brazil) Gustavo Campanharo	(Turkey) Kayserispor	Free Transfer	
10 April 2023	FW	42	(Brazil) Gabriel Barrros	(Brazil) Ituano	Undisclosed	
10 April 2023	FW	38	(Brazil) Jean Dias	(Brazil) Caxias-RS	Free Transfer	
12 June 2023	FW	13	(Ecuador) Enner Valencia	(Turkey) Fenerbahçe	Free transfer	
13 July 2023	GK	33	(Uruguay) Sergio Rochet	(Uruguay) Nacional	Free transfer	
14 August 2023	DF	2	(Spain) Hugo Mallo	(Spain) Celta de Vigo	Free transfer	
6 September 2023	DF	29	(Brazil) Dalbert	(Italy) Internazionale	Free transfer	

=== Out ===
Date	Pos.	No.	Player	To	Fee	Ref.
22 December 2022	MF	8	(Brazil) Edenílson	(Brazil) Atlético-MG	€1,180,000	
1 January 2023	MF	19	(Brazil) Rodrigo Lindoso (Note: Loaned out to Ceará SC for most of the 2022 season.)	Free Agent	End of Contract	
1 January 2023	FW	17	(Brazil) Thiago Galhardo (Note: Loaned out to Fortaleza in 2022 after a spell at Celta de Vigo.)	(Brazil) Fortaleza	End of Contract	
1 January 2023	DF	40	(Brazil) Roberto Rosa	(Brazil) Avaí	End of Contract	
1 January 2023	DF	22	(Brazil) Weverton	(Brazil) Red Bull Bragantino	End of Loan	
1 January 2023	DF	3	(Brazil) Kaique Rocha	(Italy) Sampdoria	End of Loan	
1 January 2023	FW	77	(Brazil) Gustavo Maia	(Spain) Barcelona B	End of Loan	
1 January 2023	MF	5	(Brazil) Liziero	(Brazil) São Paulo	End of Loan	
10 January 2023	GK	1	(Brazil) Daniel	(United States) San Jose Earthquakes	€600,000	
14 January 2023	FW	7	(Brazil) Taison (Note: Both player and club agreed to end their contract ahead of its expiry on 30 April 2023.)	(Greece) PAOK	Free	
23 January 2023	MF	-	(Argentina) Martín Sarrafiore	(Argentina) Independiente	Free	
28 January 2023	MF	-	(Brazil) Bruno Gomes (Note: Originally loaned for the 2023 season before Coritiba decided to his buyout.)	(Brazil) Coritiba	€1,000,000	
31 January 2023	MF	42	(Brazil) Allison	(Portugal) Estoril Praia (U23)	Undisclosed	
31 January 2023	FW	32	(Brazil) Mikael (Note: Negotiated an early release of the player's loan after just playing one match since joining in mid-2022.)	(Italy) Salernitana	Loan terminated	
18 June 2023	DF	-	(Brazil) Moisés	(Russia) CSKA Moscow	€1,500,000	
15 July 2023	FW	35	(Brazil) Alexandre Alemão (Note: Alemão joined Real Oviedo on a loan before moving to Pachuca. Inter received 70% of the total value of the deal)	(Mexico) Pachuca	€3,000,000	
31 July 2023	DF	-	(Brazil) Felipe Motta	(Brazil) Red Bull Bragantino	Free (Note: Internacional kept a percentage of the player's rights.)	

=== Loans in ===
Date	Pos.	No.	Player	From	Until	Ref.
15 December 2022	DF	2	(Russia) Mário Fernandes (Note: Loan terminated by mutual consent on 20 April 2023)	(Russia) CSKA Moscow	31 December 2023	
26 January 2023	GK	31	(Brazil) John (Note: John has left Internacional in August for Real Valladolid on a permanent transfer.)	(Brazil) Santos	31 December 2023	
10 April 2023	MF	40	(Brazil) Rômulo Zwarg	(Brazil) Athletic-MG	31 December 2023	

=== Loans Out ===
Date	Pos.	No.	Player	To	Until	Ref.
26 December 2022	GK	-	(Brazil) Vitor Hugo	(Brazil) Vila Nova	31 December 2023	
30 December 2022	DF	-	(Brazil) Heitor (Note: Loaned out to Cercle Brugge during the second half of the 2022 season. Returned from loan following the end of the 2023 Campeonato Paulista)	(Brazil) Ferroviária	30 June 2023	
7 January 2023	FW	9	(Argentina) Braian Romero	(Mexico) Tijuana	30 June 2023	
16 January 2023	FW	-	(Brazil) David	(Brazil) São Paulo	31 December 2023	
20 January 2023	FW	-	(Brazil) Peglow (Note: Hasn't played for the club since 2021 after loans to FC Porto B and Atlético-GO. Returned and was eventually loaned out to Sport Recife until the end of the season.)	(Ukraine) Dnipro	31 December 2023	
4 April 2023	DF	-	(Brazil) Heitor	(Brazil) Mirassol	31 December 2023	
15 July 2023	MF	-	(Brazil) Baralhas (Note: A buyout clause for the player was agreed between clubs)	(Brazil) Atlético-GO	31 December 2023	
18 July 2023	DF	-	(Brazil) Paulo Victor (Note: Paulo Victor had been loaned to Vasco da Gama since 2022.)	(Brazil) Ceará	31 December 2023	

== Competitions ==
=== Overview ===
Competition	First match	Last match	Starting round	Final position	Record							
Competition	First match	Last match	Starting round	Final position	Pld	W	D	L	GF	GA	GD	Win %
Série A	15 April 2023	6 December 2023	Matchday 1	9th	38	15	10	13	46	45	+1	39.47
Campeonato Gaúcho	21 January 2023	26 March 2023	Matchday 1	Semi-finals	13	6	6	1	24	10	+14	46.15
Copa do Brasil	11 April 2023	31 May 2023	Third round	Round of 16	4	2	0	2	6	6	+0	50.00
Copa Libertadores	4 April 2023	4 October 2023	Group stage	Semi-finals	12	6	4	2	19	13	+6	50.00
Total					67	29	20	18	95	74	+21	43.28

Source: Competitions

=== Campeonato Gaúcho ===
==== League table ====
Pos	Team	Pld	W	D	L	GF	GA	GD	Pts	Qualification or relegation
1	Grêmio	11	9	2	0	22	5	+17	29	Qualification to Knockout stage
2	Internacional	11	6	4	1	22	8	+14	22	Qualification to Knockout stage
3	Caxias	11	5	5	1	19	11	+8	20	Qualification to Knockout stage
4	Ypiranga	11	5	3	3	17	15	+2	18	Qualification to Knockout stage
5	Juventude	11	4	5	2	17	14	+3	17	

Updated to match(es) played on unknown. Source: Soccerway
Rules for classification: 1) Points; 2) Wins; 3) Goal difference; 4) Goals scored; 5) fewest red cards; 6) fewest yellow cards; 7) Draw in the headquarters of the FGF.

==== Matches ====
21 January 2023 1	Internacional	2–2	Juventude	Porto Alegre
19:00	De Pena 48'; Pedro Henrique 77'; Johnny (yellow card) 61'; Bustos (yellow card) 69'; Maurício (yellow card) 72'; Renê (yellow card) 86'	Report	Rodrigo Rodrigues 1'; Echaporã 62'; Pegorari (yellow card) 18'; Dani Bolt (yellow card) 23'; Walce (yellow card) 64'; Jean Irmer (yellow card) 67'	Stadium: Beira-Rio; Attendance: 23,131; Referee: Leandro Vuaden

25 January 2023 2	Avenida	1–1	Internacional	Santa Cruz do Sul
19:00	Carlos Henrique 4'; César Nunes (yellow card) 11'; Micael (yellow card) 20'; Wesley Pionteck (yellow card) 56'; Rafael Carrilho (yellow card) 72'	Report	De Pena (yellow card) 16', (goal) 46'; Johnny (yellow card) 72'	Stadium: Estádio dos Eucaliptos; Referee: Erico Andrade de Carvalho

28 January 2023 3	Internacional	4–0	São Luiz	Porto Alegre
16:30	Wanderson 17'; Pedro Henrique 45+1' (pen.) 60'; Rodrigo Moledo 83'	Report	Diego Rocha (yellow card) 39'	Stadium: Beira-Rio; Attendance: 12,027; Referee: Jonathan Pinheiro

2 February 2023 4	Internacional	3–0	Ypiranga	Porto Alegre
16:30	Pedro Henrique 6'; Alan Patrick 69' (pen.); Maurício 83'	Report	Matheusinho (yellow card) 51'; Ronald (yellow card) 64'; Patric Calmon (yellow card) 68'; João Pedro (yellow card) 77'; Gui Azevedo (yellow card) 86'; Lorran (yellow card) 89'	Stadium: Beira-Rio; Attendance: 14,481; Referee: Lucas Guimarães Horn

5 February 2023 5	Novo Hamburgo	0–0	Internacional	Novo Hamburgo
20:30	Lucas Gaúcho (yellow card) 34'; Zé Vitor (yellow card) 63'; Luiz Meneses (yellow card) 70'; Maurinho (yellow card) 90+5'	Report	Alemão (yellow card) 7'; Renê (yellow card) 23'; Baralhas (yellow card) 58'	Stadium: Estádio do Vale; Referee: Douglas Schwengber da Silva

8 February 2023 6	Internacional	2–2	Caxias	Porto Alegre
21:30	Pedro Henrique 25'; Alemão 90+2'; De Pena (yellow card) After FT'	Report	Wesley 79', 81', (yellow card) 81'; Vinicius Guedes (yellow card) 48'; Ricardo Lima (yellow card) 62'	Stadium: Beira-Rio; Attendance: 15,583; Referee: Leandro Vuaden

11 February 2023 7	Brasil de Pelotas	0–1	Internacional	Pelotas
20:30	Luis Gustavo (yellow card) 23'; Rone (yellow card) 36'; Rafael Dumas (yellow card) 49'; Patrick (yellow card) 68'; João Marcus (yellow card) 90+6'	Report	Alan Patrick (yellow card) 26'; Pedro Henrique 53' (pen.), (yellow card) 82'; Bustos (yellow card) 55'; John (yellow card) 57'; Vitão (yellow card) 70'; Alemão (yellow card) 84'	Stadium: Bento Freitas; Referee: Wagner Silveira Echevarria

16 February 2023 8	Internacional	2–0	São José	Porto Alegre
21:30	Pedro Henrique 66', (yellow card) 27'; Lucca 83', (yellow card) 85'; Mercado (yellow card) 35'; Baralhas (yellow card) 74'; Renê (yellow card) 86'	Report	Karl (yellow card) 22'; Jadson (yellow card) 27'; Ryan (yellow card) 72'	Stadium: Beira-Rio; Attendance: 10,812; Referee: Érico Andrade de Carvalho

25 February 2023 9	Aimoré	0–2	Internacional	São Leopoldo
16:30	Mardley (yellow card) 19'; William (yellow card) 20'; Bruno Ferreira (yellow card) 23'; Wesley (yellow card) 87'	Report	Maurício 50'; Pedro Henrique 83'; Wanderson (yellow card) 80'; Lucas Ramos (yellow card) Bench'	Stadium: Cristo Rei; Referee: Rafael Rodrigo Klein

5 March 2023 10	Grêmio	2–1	Internacional	Porto Alegre
20:00	Kannemann (yellow card) 43'; Vina 45+4', (yellow card) 55'; Reinaldo (yellow card) 72'; Thaciano (yellow card) 83'	Report	Pedro Henrique (yellow card) After HT'; Maurício (yellow card) 72'; Alan Patrick 76'; Moledo (yellow card) 80'; Lucas Ramos (yellow card) 90+4'	Stadium: Arena do Grêmio; Attendance: 49,460; Referee: Leandro Vuaden

11 March 2023 11	Internacional	4–1	Esportivo	Porto Alegre
16:30	Maurício 17'; Mercado (yellow card) 34'; Luiz Adriano 35'; Alan Patrick 60'; Alemão (yellow card) 83', (goal) 86'	Report	Xandy 9'; Fabrício Lusa (yellow card) 25'; João Gabriel (yellow card) 39'	Stadium: Beira-Rio; Attendance: 14,318; Referee: Lucas Guimarães Rechatiko Horn

==== Knockout stage ====
===== Semi-finals =====
18 March 2023 First leg	Caxias	1–1	Internacional	Caxias do Sul
16:30	Mercado 16' (o.g.); Fernando Fonseca (yellow card) 53'; Eronildo (yellow card) 72'; Marciel (yellow card) 90+3'	Report	Alan Patrick (penalty missed) 4', 5'; Wanderson (yellow card) 85'; Vitão (yellow card) 90+3'	Stadium: Estádio Centenário; Attendance: 8,429; Referee: Jean Pierre Gonçalves Lima

26 March 2023 Second leg	Internacional	1–1 (2–2 agg.) (4–5 p)	Caxias	Porto Alegre
18:00	Maurício 20', (yellow card) 44'; de Pena (yellow card) 33' (yellow-red card) 77'; Mercado (yellow card) 78'; Alan Patrick (yellow card) 80'; Alemão (yellow card) 85'; Keiller (yellow card) 90+2'; Matheus Dias (red card) After FT'	Report	Marcelo (yellow card) 31'; Dudu Mandai (yellow card) 38'; Eronildo 45+3'; Bruno (yellow card) 80'; Pedro Cuiabá (yellow card) 90'; Vinícius Guedes (red card) After FT'	Stadium: Beira-Rio; Attendance: 37,182; Referee: Rafael Rodrigo Klein
	Penalties
	Alan Patrick (penalty scored); Pedro Henrique (penalty scored); Alemão (penalty scored); Matheus Dias (penalty scored); Estêvão (penalty missed)		Marcão (penalty scored); Jean Dias (penalty scored); Vinícius Guedes (penalty scored); Marcelo (penalty scored); Wesley (penalty scored)

=== Copa Libertadores ===
Internacional has qualified for the 2023 Libertadores group stage, which was drawn by CONMEBOL on 27 March 2023.

Pos	Team	Pld	W	D	L	GF	GA	GD	Pts	Qualification	INT	NAC	DIM	MET
1	(Brazil) Internacional	6	3	3	0	10	6	+4	12	Advance to round of 16	—	2–2	3–1	1–0
2	(Uruguay) Nacional	6	3	2	1	9	7	+2	11	Advance to round of 16	1–1	—	2–1	1–0
3	(Colombia) Independiente Medellín	6	3	1	2	10	9	+1	10	Transfer to Copa Sudamericana	1–1	2–1	—	4–2
4	(Venezuela) Metropolitanos	6	0	0	6	4	11	−7	0		1–2	1–2	0–1	—

Source: CONMEBOL
Rules for classification: 1) Points; 2) Goal difference; 3) Goals scored; 4) Away goals scored; 5) CONMEBOL ranking.

4 April 2023 1	Independiente Medellín (Colombia)	1–1	(Brazil) Internacional	Medellín, Colombia
21:00 UTC−3	Moreno 52'; Torres (yellow card) 57'; Cetré (yellow card) 60'	Report	Alan Patrick 86'	Stadium: Atanasio Girardot; Attendance: 19,311; Referee: Facundo Tello (Argentina)

18 April 2023 2	Internacional (Brazil)	1–0	(Venezuela) Metropolitanos	Porto Alegre, Brazil
19:00 UTC−3	Alemão 90+1'	Report	Cova (yellow card) 85'	Stadium: Beira-Rio; Attendance: 27,885; Referee: Yael Falcón (Argentina)

3 May 2023 3	Internacional (Brazil)	2–2	(Uruguay) Nacional	Porto Alegre, Brazil
19:00 UTC−3	Wanderson (yellow card) 8'; Mercado 11', (yellow card) 90+6'; Campanharo (yellow card) 25'; de Pena 83'	Report	Pereiro (yellow card) 31'; Zabala 38'; Rodríguez (yellow card) 59'; Noguera 90+1'	Stadium: Beira-Rio; Attendance: 36,791; Referee: Facundo Tello (Argentina)

25 May 2023 4	Metropolitanos (Venezuela)	1–2	(Brazil) Internacional	Caracas, Venezuela
21:00 UTC−3	Ferro (yellow card) 14'; Vargas 50', (yellow card) 53'; Moreno (yellow card) 64'; Sequera (red card) 84'; Antón (yellow card) 90+1'	Report	Alan Patrick 17' (pen.), (yellow card) 71'; Luiz Adriano 30'; Nicolás Hernández (yellow card) 49', (red card) 90+3'; Baralhas (yellow card) 78'; Igor Gomes (yellow card) 87'	Stadium: Estadio Olímpico de la UCV; Attendance: 2,385; Referee: Nicolás Lamolina (Argentina)

7 June 2023 5	Nacional (Uruguay)	1–1	(Brazil) Internacional	Montevideo, Uruguay
19:00 UTC−3	Lozano (yellow card) 14'; Rochet (yellow card) 22'; Zabala (yellow card) 85'; Damiani 89'; Trezza (yellow card) 90'	Report	Rômulo (yellow card) 22'; Alan Patrick 63'	Stadium: Gran Parque Central; Attendance: 29,155; Referee: Darío Herrera (Argentina)

28 June 2023 6	Internacional (Brazil)	3–1	(Colombia) Independiente Medellín	Porto Alegre, Brazil
19:00 UTC−3	Maurício 3'; Luiz Adriano 22', 27'; Rômulo (yellow card) 46'; Vitão (yellow card) 65'	Report	Alvarado (yellow card) 46'; Pons 50', (yellow card) 52'; Cadavid (yellow card) 67'	Stadium: Beira-Rio; Attendance: 38,567; Referee: Facundo Tello (Argentina)

==== Round of 16 ====
The draw for the round of 16 was held on 5 July 2023.

1 August 2023 First leg	River Plate (Argentina)	2–1	(Brazil) Internacional	Buenos Aires, Argentina
21:00 UTC−3	Solari 65', 79'; Nacho Fernández (yellow card) 28'; Pírez (yellow card) 45'	Report	Bustos (yellow card) 20'; Valencia 45+1'; Mercado (yellow card) 56'; Aránguiz (yellow card) 62'; Johnny (yellow card) 69'; Pedro Henrique (yellow card) 90+2'	Stadium: Más Monumental; Attendance: 64,696; Referee: Jesús Valenzuela (Venezuela)

8 August 2023 Second leg	Internacional (Brazil)	2–1 (3–3 agg.) (9–8 p)	(Argentina) River Plate	Porto Alegre, Brazil
21:30 UTC−3	Aránguiz (yellow card) 58'; Vitão (yellow card) 63'; Wanderson (yellow card) 65'; Mercado 70'; Alan Patrick 78', (yellow card) 81'; Rochet (yellow card) 86'	Report	Armani (yellow card) 53'; Solari (yellow card) 58'; Pírez (yellow card) 77'; Rojas 90'	Stadium: Beira-Rio; Attendance: 50,479; Referee: Andrés Matonte (Uruguay)
	Penalties
	Luiz Adriano (penalty scored); Valencia (penalty scored); Bruno Henrique (penalty scored); Pedro Henrique (penalty scored); Renê (penalty scored); Mercado (penalty scored); De Pena (penalty missed); Johnny (penalty scored); Gomes (penalty scored); Rochet (penalty scored)		Palavecino (penalty scored); Beltrán (penalty scored); Nacho Fernández (penalty scored); De la Cruz (penalty scored); Colidio (penalty scored); Aliendro (penalty scored); Solari (penalty missed); Enzo Díaz (penalty scored); Paulo Díaz (penalty scored); Rojas (penalty missed)

==== Quarter-finals ====
22 August 2023 First leg	Bolívar (Bolivia)	0–1	(Brazil) Internacional	La Paz, Bolivia
19:00 UTC−3	Villamil (yellow card) 68'; Bentaberry (yellow card) 73'	Report	Valencia 16'; Renê (yellow card) 30'; Mercado (yellow card) 57'	Stadium: Hernando Siles; Attendance: 36,054; Referee: Darío Herrera (Argentina)

29 August 2023 Second leg	Internacional (Brazil)	2–0 (3–0 agg.)	(Bolivia) Bolívar	Porto Alegre, Brazil
19:00 UTC−3	Valencia 11', 60'; Alan Patrick (yellow card) 15'; Maurício (yellow card) 65'	Report	Ferreyra (yellow card) 8'; Bejarano (yellow card) 15'; Fernández (yellow card) 47', (penalty missed) 85'; Bruno Sávio (yellow card) 66'; Bentaberry (yellow card) 69'; Villamil (yellow card) 70'	Stadium: Beira-Rio; Attendance: 49,137; Referee: Esteban Ostojich (Uruguay)

==== Semi-finals ====
27 September 2023 First leg	Fluminense (Brazil)	2–2	(Brazil) Internacional	Rio de Janeiro, Brazil
21:30 UTC−3	Cano 10', 78'; Samuel Xavier (yellow card) 40' (yellow-red card) 45'; Alexsander (yellow card) 90+3'	Report	Johnny (yellow card) 43'; Mallo 45+5'; Alan Patrick 64'; Lucca (yellow card) 80'	Stadium: Maracanã; Attendance: 67,515; Referee: Darío Herrera (Argentina)

4 October 2023 Second leg	Internacional (Brazil)	1–2 (3–4 agg.)	(Brazil) Fluminense	Porto Alegre, Brazil
21:30 UTC−3	Mercado 10'; Bruno Henrique (yellow card) 77'	Report	Matheus Martinelli (yellow card) 70'; John Kennedy 81'; Cano 87'	Stadium: Beira-Rio; Attendance: 50,002; Referee: Jesús Valenzuela (Venezuela)

=== Serie A ===
Pos	Team	Pld	W	D	L	GF	GA	GD	Pts	Qualification or relegation
7	Fluminense	38	16	8	14	51	47	+4	56	Qualification for Copa Libertadores group stage (Note: Fluminense qualified for the Copa Libertadores group stage by winning the 2023 Copa Libertadores.)
8	Athletico Paranaense	38	14	14	10	51	43	+8	56	Qualification for Copa Sudamericana group stage
9	Internacional	38	15	10	13	46	45	+1	55	Qualification for Copa Sudamericana group stage
10	Fortaleza	38	15	9	14	45	44	+1	54	Qualification for Copa Sudamericana group stage
11	São Paulo	38	14	11	13	40	38	+2	53	Qualification for Copa Libertadores group stage (Note: São Paulo qualified for the Copa Libertadores group stage by winning the 2023 Copa do Brasil.)

Source: CBF
Rules for classification: 1) points; 2) wins; 3) goal difference; 4) goals scored; 5) head-to-head results (only between two teams); 6) fewest red cards; 7) fewest yellow cards; 8) drawing of lots.

==== Results summary ====
Overall								Home						Away					
Pld	W	D	L	GF	GA	GD	Pts	W	D	L	GF	GA	GD	W	D	L	GF	GA	GD
38	15	10	13	46	45	+1	55	9	5	5	30	21	+9	6	5	8	16	24	−8

==== Matches ====
The league fixtures were announced on 14 February 2023.

15 April 2023 1	Fortaleza	1–1	Internacional	Fortaleza
18:30	Moisés 56'; Guilherme (yellow card) 60'; Emanuel Brítez (yellow card) 90+8'	Report	Wanderson 54'; Moledo (yellow card) 90+10'	Stadium: Arena Castelão; Attendance: 30,191; Referee: Edina Alves Batista

23 April 2023 2	Internacional	2–1	Flamengo	Porto Alegre
11:00	Vitão (yellow card) 30'; Campanharo (yellow card) 44'; Maurício 67', 90+8', (yellow card) 90+9'	Report	Gerson 63'; Everton (yellow card) 90+11'	Stadium: Beira-Rio; Attendance: 42,759; Referee: Ramon Abatti Abel

30 April 2023 3	Internacional	1–0	Goiás	Porto Alegre
18:30	de Pena (yellow card) 45+2', (goal) 52'; Alan Patrick (yellow card) 58'; Mercado (yellow card) 72'; Alemão (yellow card) 90+7'	Report	Maguinho (yellow card) 61' (yellow-red card) 61'	Stadium: Beira-Rio; Attendance: 29,193; Referee: Rodrigo José Pereira de Lima

7 May 2023 4	São Paulo	2–0	Internacional	São Paulo
18:30	Luciano 33'; Rafinha (yellow card) 45+2'; Gabriel Neves (yellow card) 58'; Pablo Maia 70'; Wellington Rato (yellow card) 82'	Report	Maurício (yellow card) 58'; Mercado (yellow card) 67'; Moledo (yellow card) 79'; Lucca (yellow card) 87'	Stadium: Morumbi; Attendance: 46,093; Referee: Bráulio da Silva Machado

10 May 2023 5	Internacional	0–2	Athletico Paranaense	Porto Alegre
19:00	Igor Gomes (yellow card) 70'; Gabriel Barros (yellow card) 90+4'	Report	Hugo Moura (yellow card) 28'; Pedro Henrique (yellow card) 73'; Christian 79'; Bento (yellow card) 90+2'; Vitor Bueno (yellow card) 90+5'; Willian 90+6'	Stadium: Beira-Rio; Attendance: 13,537; Referee: Bruno Arleu de Araújo

13 May 2023 6	Atlético Mineiro	2–0	Internacional	Belo Horizonte
21:00	Vargas 3'; Pavón (yellow card) 7'; Jemerson (yellow card) 88'; Paulinho 90+5'	Report	Alemão (yellow card) 7'; Rômulo (yellow card) 45'; Nicolás Hernández (yellow card) 72'	Stadium: Mineirão; Attendance: 36,080; Referee: Raphael Claus

21 May 2023 7	Grêmio	3–1	Internacional	Porto Alegre
18:30	Suárez 7'; Kannemann (yellow card) 27' (yellow-red card) 52'; Villasanti 31'; Bitello 65'	Report	Campanharo (yellow card) 69'; Johnny Cardoso 87'	Stadium: Arena do Grêmio; Attendance: 39,438; Referee: Flávio Rodrigues de Souza

28 May 2023 8	Internacional	2–0	Bahia	Porto Alegre
16:00	Johnny Cardoso 49'; Campanharo (yellow card) 90+7'; Wanderson 90+9'	Report	Everaldo (yellow card) 63'; Ryan (yellow card) 68'	Stadium: Beira-Rio; Attendance: 19,037; Referee: Wagner do Nascimento Magalhães

3 June 2023 9	Santos	1–1	Internacional	Santos
21:00	Lucas Lima 12'; Joaquim (yellow card) 43'	Report	Luiz Adriano 3'; Johnny Cardoso (yellow card) 10'; Alan Patrick (yellow card) 45+4'; Jean Dias (yellow card) 73'; Nicolás Hernández (yellow card) 84'	Stadium: Vila Belmiro; Attendance: 9,600; Referee: Paulo César Zanovelli da Silva

11 June 2023 10	Internacional	2–1	Vasco	Porto Alegre
16:00	Rômulo 3'; Wanderson 16'; Matheus Dias (yellow card) 75'; Moledo (yellow card) 90+6'	Report	Lucas Piton (yellow card) 15'; Rayan 29'; Jair (yellow card) 47'; Robson Bambu (yellow card) 62'	Stadium: Beira-Rio; Attendance: 18,044; Referee: Edina Alves Batista

22 June 2023 11	Coritiba	0–1	Internacional	Curitiba
20:00	Thiago Dombroski (yellow card) 58'; Robson (yellow card) 64'	Report	Renê (yellow card) 15'; Mercado (yellow card) 19'; Campanharo (yellow card) 35'; Pedro Henrique 66' (pen.); John (yellow card) 81'	Stadium: Couto Pereira; Attendance: 25,983; Referee: André Luiz Skettino Policarpo Bento

25 June 2023 12	América Mineiro	1–2	Internacional	Belo Horizonte
18:30	Juninho 19'; Mateus Pasinato (yellow card) 78'; Danilo Avelar (yellow card) 90+2'	Report	Nicolás Hernández (yellow card) 15'; Jean Dias 63'; Alemão 85'	Stadium: Independência; Attendance: 2,249; Referee: Flávio Rodrigues de Souza

1 July 2023 13	Internacional	0–0	Cruzeiro	Porto Alegre
21:00	Renê (yellow card) 38'; Johnny (yellow card) 44'; Mercado (yellow card) 45+3'; Alan Patrick (yellow card) 45+8'; Bustos (yellow card) 79'; Vitão (yellow card) 83'	Report	Lucas Oliveira (yellow card) 25' (yellow-red card) 69'; Marlon Xavier (yellow card) 52'; Bruno Rodrigues (yellow card) 69'	Stadium: Beira-Rio; Attendance: 23,923; Referee: Wagner do Nascimento Magalhães

9 July 2023 14	Fluminense	2–0	Internacional	Rio de Janeiro
16:00	Cano (yellow card) 10', (goal) 25'; Matheus Martinelli 40'; Keno (yellow card) 45+2'	Report	de Pena (yellow card) 50'; Campanharo (yellow card) 69'; Mercado (yellow card) 71'	Stadium: Maracanã; Attendance: 34,166; Referee: Luiz Flávio de Oliveira

16 July 2023 15	Internacional	0–0	Palmeiras	Porto Alegre
11:00	Vitão (yellow card) 25'	Report	Gabriel Menino (yellow card) 32'; José López (yellow card) 38'; Gustavo Gómez (yellow card) 83'	Stadium: Beira-Rio; Attendance: 41,823; Referee: Rodrigo José Pereira de Lima

23 July 2023 16	Red Bull Bragantino	0–0	Internacional	Bragança Paulista
16:00	Hurtado (yellow card) 45+4'; Natan (yellow card) 53'; Léo Ortiz (yellow card) 78'	Report	Alan Patrick (yellow card) 74'; Matheus Dias (yellow card) 90+1'	Stadium: Nabi Abi Chedid; Attendance: 6,446; Referee: Maguielson Lima Barbosa

29 July 2023 17	Internacional	1–2	Cuiabá	Porto Alegre
16:00	Bustos 16', (yellow card) 60'; Mercado (yellow card) 41' (yellow-red card) 66'; Vitãoo (yellow card) 81'; Thauan Lara (yellow card) 90+4'	Report	Raniele 44', (yellow card) 74'; Walter (yellow card) 84'; Deyverson 88'	Stadium: Beira-Rio; Attendance: 32,020; Referee: Matheus Delgado Candançan

5 August 2023 18	Internacional	2–2	Corinthians	Porto Alegre
18:30	Bruno Henrique 17', (yellow card) 64'; de Pena (yellow card) 35' (yellow-red card) 90+2'; Johnny (yellow card) 83'; Luiz Adriano 90+9'; Rochet (yellow card) 90+11'	Report	Renato Augusto 13'; Yuri Alberto (yellow card) 38'; Ruan Oliveira (yellow card) 79'; Fábio Santos 86' (pen.); Roni (yellow card) 90+2'	Stadium: Beira-Rio; Attendance: 22,509; Referee: Wagner do Nascimento Magalhães

12 August 2023 19	Botafogo	3–1	Internacional	Rio de Janeiro
21:00	Victor Sá 55'; Nicolás Hernández 58' (o.g.); Adryelson (yellow card) 61'; Gabriel (yellow card) 63'; Luis Henrique 73'; Janderson (yellow card) 90+4'; Philipe Sampaio (yellow card) 90+10'	Report	Maurício 18'; Rochet (yellow card) 52'; Mercado (yellow card) 90+7'	Stadium: Nilton Santos; Attendance: 39,598; Referee: Flávio Rodrigues de Souza

19 August 2023 20	Internacional	0–1	Fortaleza	Porto Alegre
16:00	Bruno Henrique (yellow card) 12'; Rochet (yellow card) 12'; Pedro Henrique (yellow card) 90+4'; Nicolás Hernández (yellow card) 90+8'	Report	Zé Welison (yellow card) 12'; Thiago Galhardo 13' (pen.), (yellow card) 14'; Pochettino (yellow card) 43'; João Ricardo (yellow card) 65'; Lucero (yellow card) 90+8'	Stadium: Beira-Rio; Attendance: 21,134; Referee: Yuri Elino Ferreira da Cruz

26 August 2023 21	Flamengo	0–0	Internacional	Rio de Janeiro
18:30	Pulgar (yellow card) 42'; Wesley França (yellow card) 63'	Report	Mallo (yellow card) 29'; Matheus Dias (yellow card) 36'; Johnny (yellow card) 86'; Valencia (yellow card) 90+5'	Stadium: Maracanã; Attendance: 58,892; Referee: Edina Alves Batista

2 September 2023 22	Goiás	0–0	Internacional	Goiânia
16:00	Guilherme (yellow card) 5'; Maguinho (yellow card) 45+6' (yellow-red card) 90+1'; Lucas Halter (red card) 90+2'	Report	Aránguiz (yellow card) 27'; Valencia (yellow card) 41'; Wanderson (yellow card) 49'; Luiz Adriano (red card) 90+2'	Stadium: Serrinha; Attendance: 11,038; Referee: Bráulio da Silva Machado

13 September 2023 23	Internacional	2–1	São Paulo	Porto Alegre
21:30	Mercado (yellow card) 18'; Gabriel (yellow card) 30'; Keille (yellow card) 45+2'; Bustos 59'; Renê 70'; Matheus Dias (yellow card) 90+7'; Lucca (yellow card) 90+8'	Report	Diego Costa (yellow card) 16'; Pablo Maia (yellow card) 41'; Calleri 45+4' (pen.), (yellow card) 90+4'; Rafinha (yellow card) 75'	Stadium: Beira-Rio; Attendance: 20,763; Referee: Paulo César Zanovelli da Silva

21 September 2023 24	Athletico Paranaense	2–1	Internacional	Curitiba
19:30	Erick 24'; Vitor Bueno (yellow card) 31'; Pablo (yellow card) 45+7'; Thiago Heleno (yellow card) 45+10'; Alex Santana 90'	Report	Nicolás Hernández (yellow card) 7'; Matheus Dias (yellow card) 12'; de Pena 36', (yellow card) 63'; Bustos (yellow card) 50'; Wanderson (yellow card) 90+8'	Stadium: Ligga Arena; Referee: Wagner do Nascimento Magalhães

30 September 2023 25	Internacional	0–2	Atlético Mineiro	Porto Alegre
21:00	Igor Gomes (yellow card) 78'; Mallo (red card) 90+9'	Report	Hulk 73'; Paulinho (yellow card) 78'; Igor Gomes 81'	Stadium: Beira-Rio; Attendance: 23,937; Referee: Ramon Abatti Abel

8 October 2023 26	Internacional	3–2	Grêmio	Porto Alegre
16:00	Valencia 6', (yellow card) 90+1'; Johnny (yellow card) 14'; Mercado (yellow card) 39'; Wanderson 49'; Renê (yellow card) 66'; Alan Patrick 70'; Igor Gomes (yellow card) 82'; Nicolás Hernández (yellow card) 90+3'	Report	Kannemann (yellow card) 28'; Ferreira (yellow card) 52'; Villasanti (yellow card) 63'; João Pedro 67'; Suárez 74'; Geromel (yellow card) 90+4'	Stadium: Beira-Rio; Attendance: 39,133; Referee: Paulo César Zanovelli da Silva

18 October 2023 27	Bahia	1–0	Internacional	Salvador
21:30	Rezende (yellow card) 30'; Biel 44'	Report	Vitão (yellow card) 52'; Lucca (red card) 83'	Stadium: Arena Fonte Nova; Attendance: 31,385; Referee: Marcelo de Lima Henrique

22 October 2023 28	Internacional	7–1	Santos	Porto Alegre
16:00	Kevyson 1' (o.g.); Alan Patrick 14'; Valencia 27', 61'; Wanderson 39'; Renê (yellow card) 45+1'; Bustos 54'; Luiz Adriano 75'	Report	Maximiliano Silvera 80'; Nonato (yellow card) 85'	Stadium: Beira-Rio; Attendance: 35,447; Referee: Paulo César Zanovelli da Silva

26 October 2023 29	Vasco	1–2	Internacional	Rio de Janeiro
19:00	Zé Gabriel (yellow card) 37'; Paulinho (yellow card) 48' (yellow-red card) 90+1'; Alex Teixeira 84'; Erick Marcus (yellow card) 88' (yellow-red card) 90+5'	Report	Maurício 20'; Wanderson (yellow card) 51'; Rochet (yellow card) 59'; Valencia 59'; Mercado (yellow card) 81'; de Pena (yellow card) 90+7'	Stadium: São Januário; Attendance: 20,098; Referee: Luiz Flávio de Oliveira

29 October 2023 30	Internacional	3–4	Coritiba	Porto Alegre
18:30	Vitão (red card) 9'; Valencia (yellow card) 35', (penalty missed) 90+11', 90+12'; Alan Patrick 43' (pen.), (yellow card) 74'; Aránguiz (yellow card) 45+3'; Maurício (yellow card) 69'; Pedro Henrique (yellow card) 72'; Bruno Henrique 83'; Johnny (yellow card) 86'; Keiller (yellow card) 90+9'	Report	Garcez 28'; Matheus Bianqui (yellow card) 45', (goal) 45+4'; Natanael (yellow card) 55'; Robson 70' (pen.), 90' (pen.); Marcelino Moreno (yellow card) 78'; Hayner (yellow card) 90+1'; Reynaldo (yellow card) 90+10'	Stadium: Beira-Rio; Attendance: 35,245; Referee: André Luiz Skettino Policarpo Bento

1 November 2023 31	Internacional	1–1	América Mineiro	Porto Alegre
19:00	Valencia 15'	Report	Marlon 74'; Danilo Avelar (yellow card) 76'; Alê (yellow card) 90+4'	Stadium: Beira-Rio; Attendance: 14,961; Referee: Flávio Rodrigues de Souza

5 November 2023 32	Cruzeiro	1–2	Internacional	Belo Horizonte
16:00	Bruno Rodrigues (yellow card) 74', (goal) 90+2' (pen.); Matheus Jussa (yellow card) 61'	Report	Maurício 14'; Wanderson 52'; Bustos (yellow card) 56'	Stadium: Mineirão; Attendance: 36,801; Referee: Matheus Candançan

8 November 2023 33	Internacional	0–0	Fluminense	Porto Alegre
19:00	Bruno Henrique (yellow card) 75'; Mercado (yellow card) 75'	Report	Alexsander (yellow card) 45+2'; Guga (yellow card) 90+3'	Stadium: Beira-Rio; Attendance: 18,669; Referee: Caio Max Augusto Vieira

11 November 2023 34	Palmeiras	3–0	Internacional	Barueri
21:00	Murilo (yellow card) 36'; Zé Rafael 38'; Endrick 59'; Rony 88'	Report	Aránguiz (yellow card) 14'; Dalbert (yellow card) 33'; Alan Patrick (yellow card) 68'	Stadium: Arena Barueri; Attendance: 19,358; Referee: Paulo César Zanovelli da Silva

26 November 2023 35	Internacional	1–0	Red Bull Bragantino	Porto Alegre
18:30	Valencia 30' (pen.); Mercado (yellow card) 39'; Rômulo (yellow card) 65'; Maurício (yellow card) 69'; Renê (yellow card) 85'; Luiz Adriano (yellow card) 90'	Report	Lucas Evangelista (yellow card) 33'; Gustavinho (yellow card) 80'; Luan Cândido (yellow card) 90+2'; Léo Ortiz (yellow card) 90+4'; Jadsom (yellow card) 90+5'	Stadium: Beira-Rio; Attendance: 22,170; Referee: Felipe Fernandes de Lima

29 November 2023 36	Cuiabá	0–2	Internacional	Cuiabá
20:00	Raniele (yellow card) 39'; Matheus Alexandre (yellow card) 47'; Filipe Augusto (yellow card) 76'	Report	Johnny (yellow card) 12'; Valencia 52'; Pedro Henrique 89', (yellow card) 90+6'	Stadium: Arena Pantanal; Attendance: 12,527; Referee: Dyorgines José Padovani de Andrade

2 December 2023 37	Corinthians	1–2	Internacional	São Paulo
18:00	Gil (yellow card) 50'; Romero 57'; Moscardo (yellow card) 79'; Lucas Veríssimo (red card) 90+4'	Report	Igor Gomes (yellow card) 18'; Maurício 35'; Wanderson 66'; Campanharo (yellow card) 90+12'	Stadium: Neo Química Arena; Attendance: 40,583; Referee: Caio Max Augusto Vieira

6 December 2023 38	Internacional	3–1	Botafogo	Porto Alegre
21:30	Valencia 19'; Alan Patrick 50'; Pedro Henrique 53', (yellow card) 54'	Report	Danilo Barbosa (yellow card) 45+1'; Janderson 47'; Matheus Nascimento (yellow card) 90+3'	Stadium: Beira-Rio; Attendance: 27,365; Referee: Flávio Rodrigues de Souza

=== Copa do Brasil ===
==== Third round ====
11 April 2023 First leg	Internacional	2–1	CSA	Porto Alegre
20:00 UTC−3	Alan Patrick 24', 50'; Baralhas (yellow card) 29'; Mercado (yellow card) 48'; Vitão (yellow card) 55'; Lucca (yellow card) 67'	Report	Gabriel Taliari 10', (yellow card) 86'; Thiaguinho (yellow card) 39'; Rafael Forster (yellow card) 42'; Cedric (yellow card) 72'	Stadium: Beira-Rio; Attendance: 19,024; Referee: Yuri Elino Ferreira da Cruz

27 April 2023 Second leg	CSA	2–1 (3–3 agg.) (6–7 p)	Internacional	Maceió
20:00 UTC−3	Tomas Bastos (yellow card) 19', (goal) 40'; Moisés Ribeiro (yellow card) 23'; Thiaguinho 81', (yellow card) 81'; Almir Luan (yellow card) 90+2'	Report	Pedro Henrique (yellow card) 20'; Alan Patrick 63' (pen.)	Stadium: Rei Pelé; Referee: Flávio Rodrigues de Souza
	Penalties
	Rodolfo (penalty scored); Yago Henrique (penalty missed); Thiaguinho (penalty scored); Rhuan (penalty scored); Gabriel Taliari (penalty scored); Luís Felipe (penalty scored); Almir Luan (penalty scored); Bruno Matias (penalty missed)		Luiz Adriano (penalty scored); Maurício (penalty missed); Renê (penalty scored); Jean Dias (penalty scored); De Pena (penalty scored); Wanderson (penalty scored); Matheus Dias (penalty scored); Vitão (penalty scored)

==== Round of 16 ====
17 May 2023 First leg	América Mineiro	2–0	Internacional	Belo Horizonte
21:30 UTC−3	Emmanuel Martínez (yellow card) 30'; Wellington Paulista (yellow card) 45+4'; Everaldo (yellow card) 83'; Aloísio 90+3' (pen.), 90+17' (pen.); Alê (yellow card) 90+9'	Report	Thauan Lara (yellow card) 25'; Alan Patrick (yellow card) 45+5' (yellow-red card) 65'; Campanharo (yellow card) 56'; Pedro Henrique (yellow card) 90+1'; Mercado (yellow card) 90+1'; de Pena (yellow card) 90+4'; Bustos (red card) 90+16'	Stadium: Independência; Referee: Bruno Arleu de Araújo

31 May 2023 Second leg	Internacional	3–1 (3–3 agg.) (4–5 p)	América Mineiro	Porto Alegre
21:30 UTC−3	Nicolás Hernández 20'; Igor Gomes 33', (yellow card) 34'; de Pena (yellow card) 41'; Pedro Henrique 45+2'; Lucca (yellow card) 51'; John (yellow card) 66'	Report	Everaldo (yellow card) 44'; Juninho 77'; Danilo Avelar (yellow card) 79'; Rodrigo Varanda (yellow card) 90+6'	Stadium: Beira-Rio; Attendance: 36,560; Referee: Luiz Flávio de Oliveira
	Penalties
	Renê (penalty scored); Alemão (penalty scored); de Pena (penalty missed); Matheus Dias (penalty scored); Jean Dias (penalty scored)		Wellington Paulista (penalty scored); Gonzalo Mastriani (penalty scored); Danilo Avelar (penalty scored); Rodrigo Varanda (penalty scored); Iago Maidana (penalty scored)

== Statistics ==
Player with no appearances not included on list. Matches played as a sub in parentheses.

* Denotes a player that did not end the season at the club

As of As of 6 December 2023

=== Player stats ===
No.	Pos.	Nat.	Player	Brasileirão		Copa do Brasil		Copa Libertadores		Campeonato Gaúcho		Total	
No.	Pos.	Nat.	Player	P	G	P	G	P	G	P	G	P	G
1	GK	(Brazil)	Keiller	10	0	3	0	3	0	12	0	28	0
31	GK	(Brazil)	John*	9	0	1	0	3	0	1	0	14	0
33	GK	(Uruguay)	Sergio Rochet	19	0	0	0	6	0	0	0	25	0
2	DF	(Spain)	Hugo Mallo	6(3)	0	0	0	3	1	0	0	9(3)	1
2	DF	(Russia)	Mário Fernandes*	0	0	0	0	0	0	5(1)	0	5(1)	0
4	DF	(Brazil)	Rodrigo Moledo	7(2)	0	3	0	3(2)	0	11(3)	1	24(7)	1
6	DF	(Brazil)	Renê	28(4)	1	3	0	10	0	11	0	52(4)	1
16	DF	(Argentina)	Fabricio Bustos	29(1)	3	1	0	6(1)	0	13(4)	0	50(6)	3
21	DF	(Brazil)	Igor Gomes	24(10)	0	2	1	8(5)	0	1(1)	0	35(16)	1
22	DF	(Colombia)	Nico Hernández	23(11)	0	2(1)	1	3(1)	0	0	0	28(13)	1
25	DF	(Argentina)	Gabriel Mercado	26(1)	0	2	0	11	3	6	0	45(1)	3
29	DF	(Brazil)	Dalbert	9(2)	0	0	0	1(1)	0	0	0	10(3)	0
36	DF	(Brazil)	Thauan Lara	10(7)	0	2(1)	0	3(1)	0	4(2)	0	19(11)	0
43	DF	(Brazil)	Felipe Motta*	0	0	0	0	0	0	1(1)	0	1(1)	0
44	DF	(Brazil)	Vitão	26(1)	0	3(1)	0	10	0	12	0	51(2)	0
50	DF	(Brazil)	João Dalla Corte	1(1)	0	0	0	0	0	0	0	1(1)	0
8	MF	(Brazil)	Bruno Henrique	20(10)	2	0	0	5(5)	0	0	0	25(15)	2
10	MF	(Brazil)	Alan Patrick	34(6)	4	3	3	12	5	13(1)	4	62(7)	16
14	MF	(Uruguay)	Carlos De Pena	27(11)	2	4(2)	0	11(7)	1	12(2)	2	54(22)	5
15	MF	(Brazil)	Lucas Ramos	1(1)	0	1(1)	0	0	0	7(7)	0	9(9)	0
17	MF	(Brazil)	Gustavo Campanharo	15(7)	0	3	0	5(3)	0	0	0	23(10)	0
20	MF	(Chile)	Charles Aránguiz	22(6)	0	0	0	6	0	0	0	28(6)	0
23	MF	(Brazil)	Gabriel	15(6)	0	0	0	2(2)	0	0	0	17(8)	0
26	MF	(Brazil)	Estêvão	1(1)	0	1(1)	0	0	0	9(9)	0	11(11)	0
27	MF	(Brazil)	Maurício	26(4)	6	2(1)	0	7	1	13(2)	4	48(7)	11
30	MF	(United States)	Johnny	22(2)	2	4(2)	0	11	0	12(4)	0	49(8)	2
33	MF	(Brazil)	Gabriel Baralhas*	5(3)	0	2	0	3(2)	0	8(3)	0	18(8)	0
40	MF	(Brazil)	Rômulo	20(8)	1	0	0	5(2)	0	0	0	25(10)	1
41	MF	(Brazil)	Matheus Dias	14(8)	0	3(2)	0	3(3)	0	8(4)	0	28(17)	0
9	FW	(Brazil)	Luiz Adriano	29(12)	3	2(1)	0	11(6)	3	4(1)	1	46(20)	7
11	FW	(Belgium)	Wanderson	32(6)	7	4	0	12(1)	0	13(2)	1	61(9)	8
13	FW	(Ecuador)	Enner Valencia	22(4)	9	0	0	6	4	0	0	28(4)	13
28	FW	(Brazil)	Pedro Henrique	26(12)	3	4(1)	1	8(5)	0	12(3)	8	50(21)	12
35	FW	(Brazil)	Alexandre Alemão*	9(6)	1	4(2)	0	5(4)	1	11(6)	2	29(18)	4
38	FW	(Brazil)	Jean Dias	10(9)	1	3(3)	0	1(1)	0	0	0	14(13)	1
42	FW	(Brazil)	Gabriel Barros	5(3)	0	0	0	0	0	0	0	5(3)	0
45	FW	(Brazil)	Lucca	19(15)	0	2(1)	0	5(5)	0	6(6)	1	32(27)	1

=== Assists ===
Rank	No.	Pos.	Nat.	Player	Brasileirão	Copa do Brasil	Libertadores	Campeonato Gaúcho	Total
1	11	FW	(Belgium)	Wanderson	3	0	3	6	12
2	27	MF	(Brazil)	Maurício	6	0	2	3	11
3	10	MF	(Brazil)	Alan Patrick	5	0	5	0	10
4	14	FW	(Uruguay)	Carlos De Pena	6	0	1	0	7
5	16	DF	(Argentina)	Fabricio Bustos	3	0	0	1	4
5	28	FW	(Brazil)	Pedro Henrique	2	0	1	1	4
6	30	MF	(United States)	Johnny	3	0	0	0	3
6	45	FW	(Brazil)	Lucca	1	0	2	0	3
6	9	FW	(Brazil)	Luiz Adriano	1	0	1	1	3
7	13	FW	(Ecuador)	Enner Valencia	1	0	1	0	2
7	22	DF	(Colombia)	Nico Hernández	2	0	0	0	2
7	6	DF	(Brazil)	Renê	1	0	1	0	2
8	20	MF	(Chile)	Charles Aránguiz	1	0	0	0	1
8	38	FW	(Brazil)	Jean Dias	1	0	0	0	1
8	42	FW	(Brazil)	Gabriel Barros	1	0	0	0	1

=== Goalkeeping ===
The list is sorted by shirt number when total clean sheets are equal. Numbers in parentheses represent games where both goalkeepers participated and both kept a clean sheet; the number in parentheses is awarded to the goalkeeper who was substituted on, whilst a full clean sheet is awarded to the goalkeeper who was on the field at the start of play.

Penalties stats do not include penalty shootouts.

Goalkeepers					Clean sheets					Penalties	
No.	Nat.	Player	Apps	Goals conceded	Brasileirão	Copa do Brasil	Copa Libertadores	Campeonato Gaúcho	Total	Penalties faced	Penalties saved
1	(Brazil)	Keiller	28	32	1	0	1	6	8	4	1
31	(Brazil)	John	14	10	5	0	0	0	5	0	0
33	(Uruguay)	Sergio Rochet	25	32	5	-	2	-	7	6	1
Totals				74	11	0	3	6	20	10	2
