= Rômulo Zwarg =

Brazilian footballer

Rômulo
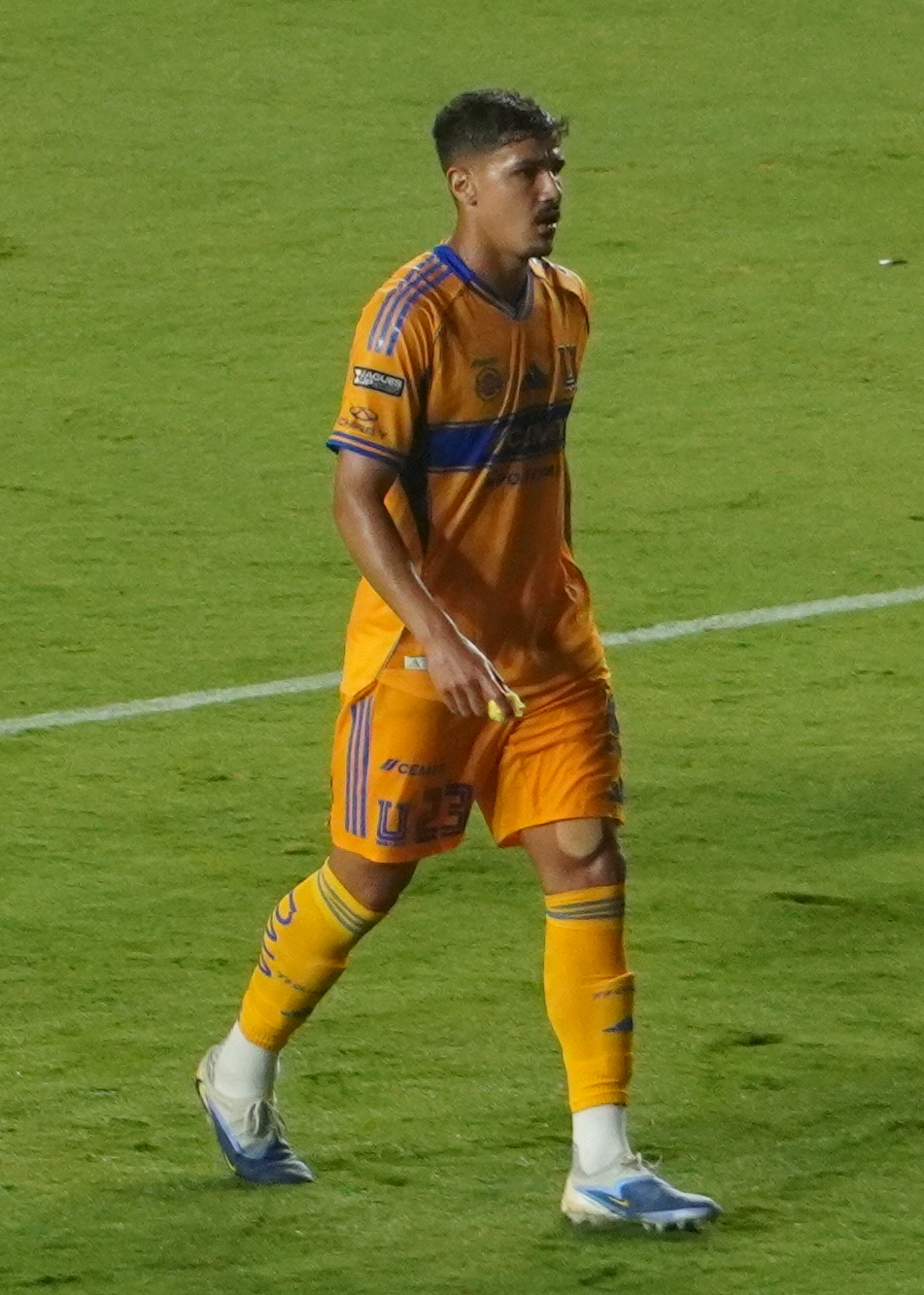
- Rômulo with Tigres UANL in 2025

Personal information
- Full name: Rômulo Zanre Zwarg
- Date of birth: 1 March 2000 (age 26)
- Place of birth: Campo Grande, Brazil
- Height: 1.81 m (5 ft 11 in)
- Position: Defensive midfielder

Team information
- Current team: Tigres UANL
- Number: 23

Youth career
- 2015–2019: Desportivo Brasil
- 2018–2019: → Cruzeiro (loan)

Senior career*
Years	Team	Apps	(Gls)
2018–2019	Desportivo Brasil	0	(0)
2018–2019	→ Cruzeiro (loan)	0	(0)
2020–2022	Deportes La Serena	31	(2)
2022	→ Juventude (loan)	6	(1)
2023	Athletic-MG	7	(1)
2023	→ Internacional (loan)	20	(1)
2024	Internacional	42	(0)
2025–	Tigres UANL	12	(0)
- * Club domestic league appearances and goals as of 18:47, 29 May 2025 (UTC)

Rômulo Zanre Zwarg (born 1 March 2000), also known as Rômulo Zwarg or simply Rômulo, is a Brazilian professional footballer who plays for Liga MX club Tigres UANL. Mainly a defensive midfielder, he can also play as a right-back or a centre-back.

== Career ==
=== Early career ===
Born in Campo Grande, Mato Grosso do Sul, Rômulo joined Desportivo Brasil's youth sides at the age of 15, and made his first team debut on 8 August 2018, in a 1–0 Copa Paulista home win over Rio Claro. In September of that year, he was loaned to Cruzeiro and returned to the under-20 squad.

=== Deportes La Serena ===
Rômulo left Cruzeiro in January 2020, after his loan expired, and joined Chilean Primera División club Deportes La Serena on 16 February. He made his professional debut on 4 September, starting in a 1–1 home draw against O'Higgins.

Rômulo scored his first goal at professional level on 21 December 2020, netting his side's second in a 2–0 away win over Universidad de Chile. He started to feature regularly in the 2021 season, but as a right-back.

==== Loan to Juventude ====
On 7 January 2022, Rômulo returned to his home country after agreeing to a loan deal with Juventude. He made his Série A debut on 16 April, coming on as a second-half substitute for Rodrigo Soares and scoring his side's only in a 4–1 away loss to América Mineiro.

Rômulo featured rarely as the club suffered relegation, only contributing with eight appearances in the year.

=== Athletic-MG ===
On 9 January 2023, Athletic-MG announced the signing of Rômulo. He became an undisputed starter for the side during the 2023 Campeonato Mineiro, scoring once in eight matches as the club was eliminated in the semifinals.

=== Internacional ===
On 12 April 2023, Rômulo was announced at Internacional on loan until the end of the year. Initially a fourth-choice behind Johnny Cardoso, Gustavo Campanharo and Gabriel Baralhas, he later overtook Campanharo in the starting eleven, and established himself as a first-choice after Johnny was sold.

On 14 January 2024, Inter executed the buyout clause on Rômulo's contract, and the player signed a permanent deal until the end of 2027. Already established as a regular starter, he featured in 47 matches overall during the year.

=== Tigres UANL ===
On 26 January 2025, Inter announced the transfer of Rômulo to Liga MX club Tigres UANL, for a rumoured fee of US$ 5 million. He was often deployed as a centre-back by manager Guido Pizarro, and scored his first goal for the club on 8 April, netting his side's third in a 3–2 home win over LA Galaxy which qualified the club to the 2025 CONCACAF Champions Cup semifinals.

== Career statistics ==
As of 27 August 2025

Club	Season	League			State League (Note: Includes Campeonato Gaúcho, Campeonato Mineiro)		Cup (Note: Includes Copa Chile, Copa do Brasil)		Continental		Other		Total	
Club	Season	Division	Apps	Goals	Apps	Goals	Apps	Goals	Apps	Goals	Apps	Goals	Apps	Goals
Desportivo Brasil	2018	Paulista A3	—		—		—		—		2 (Note: Appearance(s) in Copa Paulista)	0	2	0
Cruzeiro (loan)	2019	Série A	0	0	—		—		—		—		0	0
Deportes La Serena	2020	Chilean Primera División	10	1	—		—		—		—		10	1
Deportes La Serena	2021	Chilean Primera División	21	1	—		4	0	—		—		25	1
Deportes La Serena	Total		31	2	—		4	0	—		—		35	2
Juventude (loan)	2022	Série A	4	1	2	0	2	0	—		—		8	1
Athletic-MG	2023	Série A	—		7	1	1	0	—		—		8	1
Internacional	2023	Série A	20	1	—		—		5 (Note: Appearance(s) in Copa Libertadores)	0	—		25	1
Internacional	2024	Série A	30	0	12	0	2	0	3 (Note: Appearance(s) in Copa Sudamericana)	0	—		47	0
Internacional	Total		50	1	12	0	2	0	8	0	—		72	1
Tigres UANL	2024–25	Liga MX	12	0	—		—		5 (Note: Appearance(s) in CONCACAF Champions Cup)	1	—		17	1
Tigres UANL	2025–26	Liga MX	5	0	—		—		—		3 (Note: Appearance(s) in Leagues Cup)	0	8	0
Tigres UANL	Total		17	0	—		—		5	1	3	0	25	1
Career total			102	4	21	1	9	0	13	1	5	0	150	6
