= João Dalla Corte =

Brazilian footballer (born 2006)

Personal information
- Full name: João Paulo Dalla Corte
- Date of birth: 7 June 2006 (age 20)
- Place of birth: Encruzilhada do Sul, Brazil
- Height: 1.78 m (5 ft 10 in)
- Position: Centre back

Team information
- Current team: Internacional
- Number: 50

Youth career
- Novo Horizonte
- 2015–: Internacional

Senior career*
Years	Team	Apps	(Gls)
2023–	Internacional	1	(0)

International career^{‡}
2022–	Brazil U17	12	(1)
- * Club domestic league appearances and goals as of 22:32, 1 November 2023 (UTC) ‡ National team caps and goals as of 22:32, 1 November 2023 (UTC)

João Paulo Dalla Corte (born 7 June 2006) is a Brazilian footballer who currently plays as a central defender for Internacional.

== Club career ==
Born in Encruzilhada do Sul, Rio Grande do Sul, Dalla Corte joined Internacional's youth categories in 2015, aged nine, from local side SE Novo Horizonte. In October 2023, he started to feature in first team call-ups, after both Igor Gomes and Nicolás Hernández were suspended.

Dalla Corte made his professional – and Série A – debut on 29 October 2023, coming on as a second-half substitute for Dalbert in a 4–3 home loss to Coritiba; aged 17 years, four months and 22 days, he became the youngest player to debut for Inter since Alexandre Pato in 2006.

== International career ==
Dalla Corte represented the Brazil national under-17 team in the 2022 Montaigu Tournament and the 2023 South American U-17 Championship, winning both tournaments with the side.

== Career statistics ==
As of 1 November 2023

Club	Season	League			State League		Cup		Continental		Other		Total	
Club	Season	Division	Apps	Goals	Apps	Goals	Apps	Goals	Apps	Goals	Apps	Goals	Apps	Goals
Internacional	2023	Série A	1	0	—		0	0	0	0	—		1	0
Career total			1	0	0	0	0	0	0	0	0	0	1	0

== Honours ==
Brazil U17

- Montaigu Tournament: 2022
- South American U-17 Championship: 2023
