= Nicolás Hernández =

Nicolás Hernández may refer to:

- Nicolás Hernández (Argentine footballer) (born 1979), Argentine football forward
- Nicolás Hernández (Colombian footballer) (born 1998), Colombian football centre-back
