= Vitão (footballer, born February 2000) =

Brazilian footballer

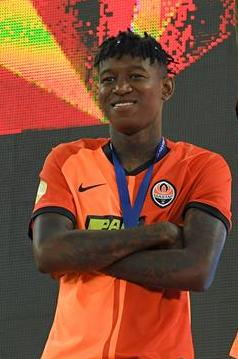

Personal information
- Full name: Vitor Eduardo da Silva Matos
- Date of birth: 2 February 2000 (age 26)
- Place of birth: Jacarezinho, Paraná, Brazil
- Height: 1.86 m (6 ft 1 in)
- Position: Centre-back

Team information
- Current team: Flamengo
- Number: 44

Youth career
- 2014–2015: PSTC
- 2015–2019: Palmeiras

Senior career*
| Years | Team | Apps | (Gls) |
| 2018–2019 | Palmeiras | 1 | (0) |
| 2019–2024 | Shakhtar Donetsk | 23 | (0) |
| 2022–2024 | → Internacional (loan) | 81 | (2) |
| 2024–2025 | Internacional | 71 | (1) |
| 2026– | Flamengo | 16 | (0) |

International career^{‡}
| 2017 | Brazil U17 | 15 | (0) |
| 2019 | Brazil U20 | 9 | (0) |
- * Club domestic league appearances and goals as of 18 October 2026 ‡ National team caps and goals as of 17 June 2019

Vitor Eduardo da Silva Matos (born 2 February 2000), commonly known as Vitão, is a Brazilian professional footballer who plays as a centre-back for Campeonato Brasileiro Série A club Flamengo.

== Club career ==
=== Internacional ===
Vitão was announced by Internacional on April 7, 2022, on a three-month loan from Shakhtar Donetsk, a move facilitated by FIFA's ruling allowing players from Ukrainian clubs to negotiate with other teams due to the Russo-Ukrainian War. Wearing the number 44 jersey, he made his debut for the 'Colorado' on April 26 in a 1–0 victory over Independiente during the third round of the Copa Sudamericana, playing 75 minutes before being replaced by Gabriel Mercado. His first goal for the club came shortly after in just his second appearance, scoring for Inter in a 1–1 draw against Juventude during the fifth round of the Campeonato Brasileiro on May 8.

In 2025, notwithstanding Internacional's poor run of form, Vitão established himself as a starter, making 52 appearances.

=== Flamengo ===
On 9 January 2026, Vitão moved to fellow Série A club Flamengo, signing a four-year contract, for a fee reported to be around €10 million.

== Career statistics ==
As of 18 October 2026

| Club | Season | League | | | State League (Note: Includes Campeonato Paulista, Campeonato Gaúcho) | | Cup (Note: Includes Ukrainian Cup, Copa do Brasil) | | Continental | | Other | | Total | |
| Club | Season | Division | Apps | Goals | Apps | Goals | Apps | Goals | Apps | Goals | Apps | Goals | Apps | Goals |
|---|---|---|---|---|---|---|---|---|---|---|---|---|---|---|
| Palmeiras | 2019 | Série A | 0 | 0 | 1 | 0 | 0 | 0 | 0 | 0 | — | | 1 | 0 |
| Shakhtar Donetsk | 2019–20 | Ukrainian Premier League | 4 | 0 | — | | — | | 0 | 0 | — | | 4 | 0 |
| Shakhtar Donetsk | 2020–21 | Ukrainian Premier League | 10 | 0 | — | | 0 | 0 | 7 (Note: Three appearances in UEFA Champions League, four appearances in UEFA Europa League) | 0 | 0 | 0 | 17 | 0 |
| Shakhtar Donetsk | 2021–22 | Ukrainian Premier League | 9 | 0 | — | | 1 | 0 | 5 (Note: Appearance(s) in UEFA Champions League) | 0 | 0 | 0 | 15 | 0 |
| Shakhtar Donetsk | Total | | 23 | 0 | — | | 1 | 0 | 12 | 0 | 0 | 0 | 36 | 0 |
| Internacional (loan) | 2022 | Série A | 31 | 2 | — | | — | | 7 (Note: Appearance(s) in Copa Sudamericana) | 0 | — | | 38 | 2 |
| Internacional (loan) | 2023 | Série A | 26 | 0 | 12 | 0 | 3 | 0 | 10 (Note: Appearance(s) in Copa Libertadores) | 0 | — | | 51 | 0 |
| Internacional | 2024 (Note: Part of this season was spent on loan from Shakhtar) | Série A | 30 | 0 | 12 | 0 | 4 | 1 | 5 | 0 | — | | 51 | 1 |
| Internacional | 2025 | Série A | 31 | 0 | 10 | 0 | 3 | 0 | 8 | 0 | — | | 52 | 0 |
| Internacional | Internacional total | | 118 | 2 | 34 | 0 | 10 | 1 | 30 | 0 | — | | 192 | 3 |
| Flamengo | 2026 | Série A | 10 | 0 | 6 | 0 | 0 | 0 | 2 | 0 | 0 | 0 | 18 | 0 |
| Career total | | | 151 | 2 | 41 | 0 | 11 | 1 | 44 | 0 | 0 | 0 | 247 | 2 |

== Honours ==
=== Club ===
==== Palmeiras ====
- Campeonato Brasileiro Série A: 2018

==== Shakhtar Donetsk ====
- Ukrainian Super Cup: 2021

==== Internacional ====
- Campeonato Gaúcho: 2025
