= Keiller (footballer) =

Brazilian footballer

Personal information
- Full name: Keiller da Silva Nunes
- Date of birth: 29 October 1996 (age 30)
- Place of birth: Eldorado do Sul, Brazil
- Height: 1.93 m (6 ft 4 in)
- Position: Goalkeeper

Team information
- Current team: Coritiba (on loan from Internacional)
- Number: 13

Youth career
- Internacional

Senior career*
Years	Team	Apps	(Gls)
2016–	Internacional	40	(0)
2021	→ Chapecoense (loan)	23	(0)
2024	→ Vasco da Gama (loan)	0	(0)
2025	→ Ceará (loan)	3	(0)
2026–	→ Coritiba (loan)	0	(0)
- * Club domestic league appearances and goals as of 13 December 2025

Keiller da Silva Nunes (born 29 October 1996) simply known as Keiller, is a Brazilian professional footballer who plays as a goalkeeper for Coritiba, on loan from Internacional.

== Career ==
Keiller made his debut in the professional team of Internacional in the 2nd Semi-Final match of 2017 Campeonato Gaúcho, replacing the injured Marcelo Lomba, against Caxias. In the penalty shootouts, Keiller defended two charges, classifying the Internacional for the Final.

Keiller also played the 1st game of the Final, against Novo Hamburgo.

In 2021, Keiller was loaned to Chapecoense for the whole season.

In 2022, Keiller returned to Inter, becoming the first-choice goalkeeper by the end of the same year in the place of the injured Daniel.

In 2024, after Sergio Rochet became the first-choice goalkeeper on Inter, Keiller was again loaned, this time to Vasco da Gama.

== Career statistics ==
As of match played 17 May 2025

Appearances and goals by club, season and competition
Club	Season	League			State League		Copa do Brasil		Continental		Other		Total	
Club	Season	Division	Apps	Goals	Apps	Goals	Apps	Goals	Apps	Goals	Apps	Goals	Apps	Goals
Internacional	2016	Série A	0	0	0	0	0	0	—		—		0	0
Internacional	2017	Série B	0	0	2 (Note: Appearance(s) in Campeonato Gaúcho)	0	0	0	—		—		2	0
Internacional	2018	Série A	0	0	0	0	0	0	—		—		0	0
Internacional	2019	Série A	0	0	0	0	0	0	0	0	—		0	0
Internacional	2020	Série A	0	0	0	0	0	0	0	0	—		0	0
Internacional	2021	Série A	0	0	0	0	0	0	0	0	—		0	0
Internacional	2022	Série A	15	0	1	0	0	0	0	0	—		16	0
Internacional	2023	Série A	10	0	12	0	3	0	3 (Note: Appearance(s) in Copa Libertadores)	0	—		28	0
Internacional	2024	Série A	0	0	0	0	0	0	0	0	—		0	0
Internacional	2025	Série A	0	0	0	0	0	0	0	0	—		0	0
Internacional	Total		25	0	15	0	3	0	3	0	—		46	0
Chapecoense (loan)	2021	Série A	16	0	14 (Note: Appearance(s) in Campeonato Catarinense)	0	0	0	—		—		30	0
Vasco da Gama (loan)	2024	Série A	0	0	0	0	0	0	—		—		0	0
Ceará (loan)	2025	Série A	0	0	3 (Note: Appearance(s) in Campeonato Cearense)	0	0	0	—		1 (Note: Appearance(s) in Copa do Nordeste)	0	4	0
Career total			41	0	32	0	3	0	3	0	1	0	80	0

== Honours ==
Internacional

- Campeonato Gaúcho: 2016

Ceará

- Campeonato Cearense: 2025
