= Estêvão (footballer, born 2002) =

Brazilian footballer

Personal information
- Full name: Estêvão Barreto de Oliveira
- Date of birth: 3 February 2002 (age 24)
- Place of birth: Amambai, Brazil
- Height: 1.76 m (5 ft 9 in)
- Position: Midfielder

Team information
- Current team: CRB
- Number: 26

Youth career
- 2010–2012: São Paulo
- 2012–2015: Santos
- 2016–2022: Internacional

Senior career*
Years	Team	Apps	(Gls)
2022–2026	Internacional	18	(0)
2024	→ Vila Nova (loan)	12	(1)
2024	→ Guarani (loan)	4	(0)
2025	→ Inter de Limeira (loan)	4	(0)
2025	→ São José (loan)	14	(1)
2026	→ Ypiranga (loan)	14	(5)
2022–	CRB	6	(0)
- * Club domestic league appearances and goals as of 17 November 2026

Estêvão Barreto de Oliveira (born 3 February 2002), simply known as Estêvão, is a Brazilian professional footballer who plays as a midfielder for CRB.

== Club career ==
Born in Amambai, Mato Grosso do Sul, Estêvão began his career with São Paulo's youth setup at the age of eight. He later spent four years at Santos before joining Internacional in 2016. He signed a professional deal with the latter club on 3 September 2018.

Estêvão made his professional – and Série A – debut on 1 May 2022, coming on as a second-half substitute for Wanderson in a 0–0 home draw against Avaí.

For 2024 season, Estêvão was loaned for Vila Nova Futebol Clube

== Career statistics ==
As of match played 15 April 2023

Appearances and goals by club, season and competition
Club	Season	League			State league (Note: Includes Campeonato Gaúcho)		Copa do Brasil		Continental		Total	
Club	Season	Division	Apps	Goals	Apps	Goals	Apps	Goals	Apps	Goals	Apps	Goals
Internacional	2022	Série A	8	0	0	0	0	0	4 (Note: Appearances in Copa Sudamericana)	1	12	1
Internacional	2023	Série A	0	0	9	0	0	0	0	0	9	0
Career total			8	0	9	0	0	0	4	1	21	1
