= Lucca (footballer, born 2003) =

Brazilian footballer

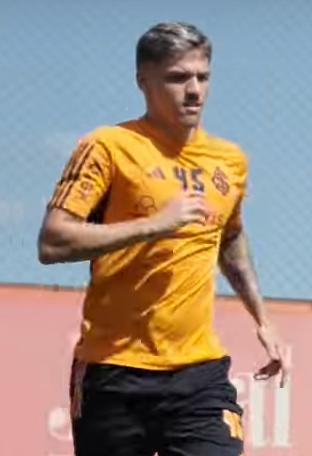
- Lucca training at Internacional in 2024

Personal information
- Full name: Lucca Holanda Sampaio Tavares
- Date of birth: 2 April 2003 (age 23)
- Place of birth: Fortaleza, Brazil
- Height: 1.80 m (5 ft 11 in)
- Position: Forward

Team information
- Current team: Ceará
- Number: 99

Youth career
- Ceará
- 2020–2021: → Internacional (loan)
- 2021–2023: Internacional

Senior career*
Years	Team	Apps	(Gls)
2023–2025	Internacional	54	(3)
2025–	Ceará	33	(4)
- * Club domestic league appearances and goals as of 18 November 2026

Lucca Holanda Sampaio Tavares (born 2 April 2003), simply known as Lucca, is a Brazilian professional footballer who plays as a forward for Ceará.

== Club career ==
Born in Fortaleza, Ceará, Lucca joined Internacional's youth setup in 2020, on loan from Ceará. On 28 July 2021, he signed a permanent deal with Inter after the club paid R$ 1.2 million for 60% of his economic rights.

On 13 December 2022, Lucca was promoted to the first team of Internacional for the 2023 season. He made his senior debut on 21 January 2023, coming on as a late substitute for Alexandre Alemão in a 2–2 Campeonato Gaúcho home draw against Juventude.

Lucca scored his first senior goal on 16 February 2023, netting his team's second in a 2–0 home win over São José-RS.

== Career statistics ==
As of 10 April 2024

Appearances and goals by club, season and competition
Club	Season	League			State League		National Cup		Continental		Other		Total	
Club	Season	Division	Apps	Goals	Apps	Goals	Apps	Goals	Apps	Goals	Apps	Goals	Apps	Goals
Internacional	2023	Série A	19	0	6	1	2	0	5 (Note: Appearance(s) in Copa Libertadores)	0	—		32	1
Internacional	2024	Série A	0	0	11	2	1	0	1 (Note: Appearance(s) in Copa Sudamericana)	0	—		14	2
Career total			19	0	17	3	3	0	6	0	0	0	46	3

== Honours ==
Internacional

- Campeonato Gaúcho: 2025
