= Johnny Cardoso =

American soccer player (born 2001)

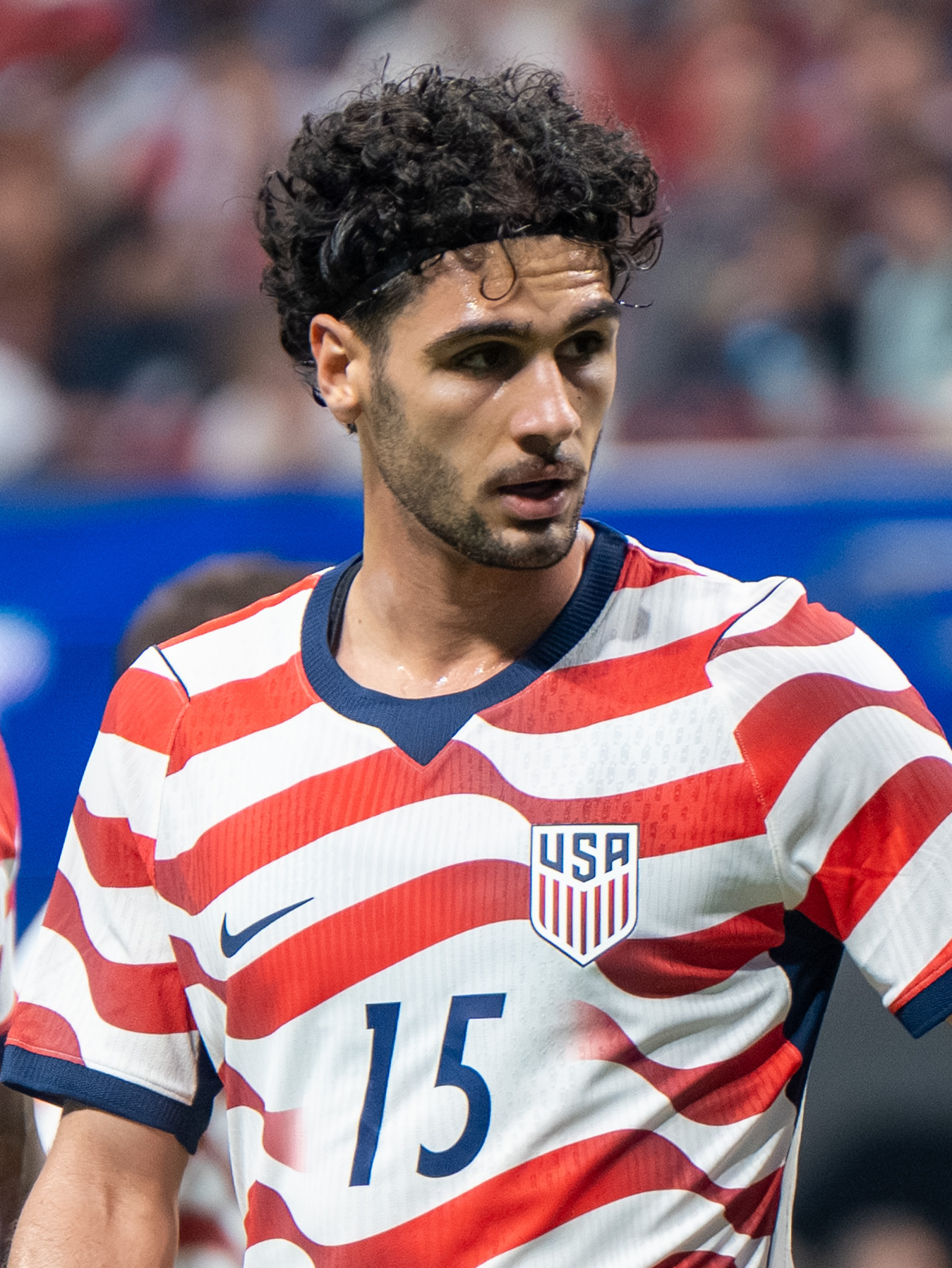
- Cardoso with the United States in 2026

Personal information
- Full name: João Lucas de Souza Cardoso
- Date of birth: September 20, 2001 (age 25)
- Place of birth: Denville Township, New Jersey, U.S.
- Height: 6 ft 0 in (1.82 m)
- Position: Midfielder

Team information
- Current team: Atlético Madrid
- Number: 5

Youth career
- 2012–2013: Criciúma
- 2013–2014: Avaí
- 2014–2019: Internacional

Senior career*
Years	Team	Apps	(Gls)
2019–2024	Internacional	117	(6)
2024–2025	Betis	45	(4)
2025–	Atlético Madrid	23	(1)

International career^{‡}
2019–2022	United States U23	4	(0)
2020–	United States	23	(0)
Medal record
Men's soccer
Representing United States
CONCACAF Gold Cup
Runner-up	2025 Canada–United States
CONCACAF Nations League
Winner	2024
- * Club domestic league appearances and goals as of November 22, 2026 ‡ National team caps and goals as of March 28, 2026

João Lucas "Johnny" de Souza Cardoso (born September 20, 2001) is an American professional soccer player who plays as a midfielder for La Liga club Atlético Madrid and the United States national team.

== Early life ==
Cardoso was born in Denville Township, New Jersey to Brazilian parents and moved to Brazil when he was three months old. He had stints at Avaí and Criciúma before moving to the youth academy of Internacional.

== Club career ==
=== Internacional ===
Cardoso made his professional debut with Internacional in a 3–1 Campeonato Brasileiro Série A win over Atlético Mineiro on September 15, 2019. He scored his first goal for Internacional on March 4, 2021, in a 2-2 draw against Pelotas, in a match valid for the Campeonato Gaúcho (Rio Grande do Sul's state championship).

Cardoso suffered some injuries during the 2023 season, but finished as a starter in the team managed by Eduardo Coudet. That year, the midfielder played in 49 matches, scored two goals and provided two assists. He departed the club at the end of the year. For Internacional, he played 144 matches, scored seven goals, gave five assists and left without winning any titles.

=== Real Betis ===
On December 27, 2023, Cardoso moved to La Liga club Real Betis on a reported five-year contract worth $6.3 million in exchange for six million euros for 80% of his rights. On January 21, 2024, Cardoso made his debut for Betis, starting and playing 73 minutes in a league match against FC Barcelona which finished in a 2–4 loss. As part of Giovani Lo Celso's transfer from Tottenham Hotspur to Betis in 2024, Tottenham acquired a non-mandatory €25 million purchase option for Cardoso in summer 2025. On February 4, 2025, Cardoso extended his contract with Betis until 2030. This season he was a regular starter with 46 matches played, scoring four goals and providing one assist. He helped the team finish runner-up in that season's UEFA Conference League, losing the final 4-1 to Chelsea. Cardoso also helped Betis qualify for the UEFA Europa League after finishing in sixth place in that season's La Liga.

=== Atlético Madrid ===
On July 16, 2025, Cardoso moved to Atlético Madrid on a five-year contract worth a reported €30 million. On February 24, 2026, he scored his first goal for the club in a 4–1 win over Club Brugge in the Champions League knockout play-offs.

== International career ==
As he was born in the United States to Brazilian parents, he was initially eligible to represent both Brazil and the United States, Cardoso received his first call-up to the United States under-23 training camp in October 2019. He received his first call up to the senior United States squad for matches against Wales and Panama in November 2020.

Cardoso was subsequently called up again to the United States under-23 team for the 2020 CONCACAF Men's Olympic Qualifying Championship, in which the United States failed to qualify for the Olympics.

In June 2023, the midfielder was called up again by the United States to compete in the final phase of that year's CONCACAF Nations League. On that occasion, the USA were crowned champions in a final against Canada, with Johnny entering the game during the second half.

In May 2026, Cardoso underwent surgery for an ankle injury, ruling him out of the 2026 FIFA World Cup on home soil.

== Personal life ==
Cardoso holds an Italian passport, which allows him to be registered as an EU player for European leagues.

== Career statistics ==
=== Club ===
As of match played November 22, 2026

Appearances and goals by club, season and competition
Club	Season	League			State league (Note: Includes Campeonato Gaúcho)		National cup (Note: Includes Copa do Brasil, Copa del Rey)		Continental		Other		Total	
Club	Season	Division	Apps	Goals	Apps	Goals	Apps	Goals	Apps	Goals	Apps	Goals	Apps	Goals
Internacional	2019	Série A	1	0	0	0	0	0	0	0	—		1	0
Internacional	2020	Série A	13	0	4	0	1	0	3 (Note: Appearance(s) in Copa Libertadores)	0	—		21	0
Internacional	2021	Série A	27	0	4	1	2	1	1	0	—		34	2
Internacional	2022	Série A	24	3	10	0	1	0	4 (Note: Appearances in Copa Sudamericana)	0	—		39	3
Internacional	2023	Série A	22	2	12	0	4	0	11	0	—		49	2
Internacional	Total		87	5	30	1	8	1	19	0	—		144	7
Betis	2023–24	La Liga	17	1	—		—		2 (Note: Appearances in UEFA Europa Conference League)	0	—		19	1
Betis	2024–25	La Liga	28	3	—		3	0	15 (Note: Appearances in UEFA Conference League)	1	—		46	4
Betis	Total		45	4	—		3	0	17	1	—		65	5
Atlético Madrid	2025–26	La Liga	15	0	—		4	0	10 (Note: Appearances in UEFA Champions League)	1	1 (Note: Appearance in Supercopa de España)	0	30	1
Atlético Madrid	2026–27	La Liga	8	1	—		0	0	2	0	0	0	10	1
Atlético Madrid	Total		23	1	—		4	0	12	1	1	0	40	2
Career total			155	10	30	1	15	1	48	2	1	0	249	14

=== International ===
As of match played March 28, 2026

Appearances and goals by national team and year
National team	Year	Apps	Goals
United States	2020	2	0
United States	2021	1	0
United States	2022	1	0
United States	2023	5	0
United States	2024	9	0
United States	2025	4	0
United States	2026	1	0
Total		23	0

== Honors ==
Real Betis

- UEFA Conference League runner-up: 2024–25

Atlético Madrid

- Copa del Rey runner-up: 2025–26

United States

- CONCACAF Nations League: 2022–23, 2023–24

Individual

- La Liga U23 Player of the Month: February 2024
