= Gabriel Barros =

Brazilian footballer (born 2001)

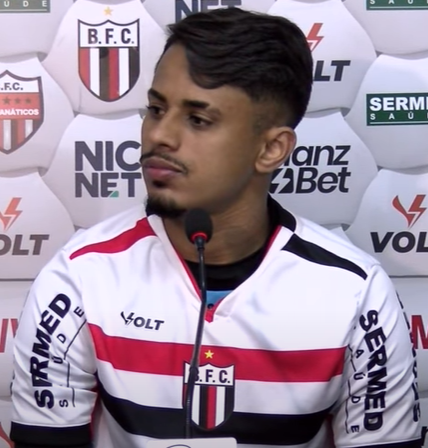

Personal information
- Full name: Gabriel de Sousa Barros
- Date of birth: 25 October 2001 (age 25)
- Place of birth: São Paulo, Brazil
- Height: 1.82 m (6 ft 0 in)
- Position: Forward

Team information
- Current team: América Mineiro (on loan from Internacional)
- Number: 11

Youth career
- 2015: Red Bull Brasil
- 2016–2017: Osasco
- 2018–2020: Ituano
- 2020: → Flamengo (loan)

Senior career*
Years	Team	Apps	(Gls)
2020–2023	Ituano	64	(11)
2021	→ Flamengo (loan)	4	(0)
2023–	Internacional	7	(0)
2024	→ Atlético Goianiense (loan)	4	(0)
2024	→ Avaí (loan)	5	(0)
2025	→ Criciúma (loan)	4	(0)
2025	→ Botafogo-SP (loan)	15	(0)
2026–	→ América Mineiro (loan)	8	(1)
- * Club domestic league appearances and goals as of 16 April 2026

Gabriel de Sousa Barros (born 25 October 2001), known as Gabriel Barros, is a Brazilian footballer who plays as a forward for América Mineiro, on loan from Internacional.

== Club career ==
=== Ituano ===
Born in São Paulo, Gabriel Barros joined Ituano's youth setup in 2018 for the under-17 squad, after representing Red Bull Brasil and Osasco. He made his first team debut on 22 February 2020, coming on as a late substitute for Yago in a 2–0 Campeonato Paulista home win over Santos.

Gabriel Barros scored his first professional goal on 26 July 2020, netting his team's third in a 3–1 away success over Santo André. On 3 September, he renewed his contract until 2023.

==== Flamengo (loan) ====
On 16 October 2020, Gabriel Barros joined Flamengo and was initially assigned to the under-20 team. He made his first team debut for Fla the following 3 March, replacing Thiago Fernandes late in a 1–0 Campeonato Carioca away win over Nova Iguaçu.

On 2 December 2021, after four first team appearances, Gabriel Barros returned to Ituano after Flamengo opted to not exercise his buyout clause.

==== Breakthrough ====
Upon returning, Gabriel Barros was regularly used by Ituano during the 2022 season, being one of the spotlights of the club as they narrowly missed out promotion in the 2022 Série B.

=== Internacional ===
On 11 April 2023, Gabriel Barros was announced at Internacional in the top tier, signing a contract until December 2026.

== Career statistics ==
=== Club ===
As of 11 April 2023.

Club	Season	League			State League		Cup		Continental		Other		Total	
Club	Season	Division	Apps	Goals	Apps	Goals	Apps	Goals	Apps	Goals	Apps	Goals	Apps	Goals
Ituano	2020	Série C	9	2	5 (Note: Appearances in the Campeonato Paulista.)	2	—		—		—		14	4
Ituano	2022	Série B	24	3	11	3	—		—		—		35	6
Ituano	2023	Série B	0	0	13	1	2	0	—		—		15	1
Ituano	Total		33	5	29	6	2	0	—		—		64	11
Flamengo (loan)	2021	Série A	0	0	4 (Note: Appearances in the Campeonato Carioca.)	0	0	0	0	0	—		4	0
Internacional	2023	Série A	0	0	—		—		0	0	—		0	0
Career total			33	5	33	6	2	0	0	0	0	0	68	11

== Honours ==
=== Club ===
Flamengo

- Campeonato Carioca: 2021
