= Sergio Rochet =

Uruguayan footballer (born 1993)

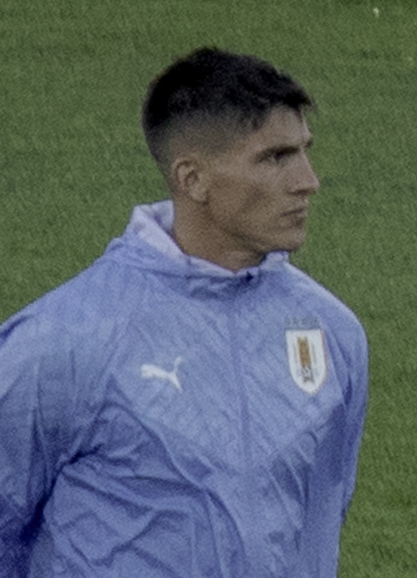
- Rochet lining up for Uruguay in 2022

Personal information
- Full name: Sergio Ramón Rochet Álvarez
- Date of birth: 23 March 1993 (age 33)
- Place of birth: Nueva Palmira, Uruguay
- Height: 1.89 m (6 ft 2 in)
- Position: Goalkeeper

Team information
- Current team: Internacional
- Number: 1

Youth career
- Danubio
- AZ

Senior career*
Years	Team	Apps	(Gls)
2014–2017	AZ	51	(0)
2017–2019	Sivasspor	15	(0)
2019–2023	Nacional	100	(0)
2023–	Internacional	79	(0)

International career^{‡}
2022–	Uruguay	36	(0)
Medal record
Men's football
Representing Uruguay
Copa América
Third place	2024 United States
- * Club domestic league appearances and goals as of 9 May 2026 ‡ National team caps and goals as of 27 June 2026

Sergio Ramón Rochet Álvarez (born 23 March 1993) is an Uruguayan professional footballer who plays as a goalkeeper for Campeonato Brasileiro Série A club Internacional and Uruguay national team. He represented Uruguay at the 2022, and 2026 World Cups.

== Club career ==
Rochet started his career with Danubio with whom he made no appearances.

=== AZ Alkmaar ===
In April 2014, he went to trial with Dutch club AZ as they wanted a goalkeeper to serve as backup for Esteban Alvarado after the departure of Erik Heijblok. On 19 May 2014, he underwent medicals. Finally on 24 May 2014, he was signed by AZ for a contract until 2016.

Rochet made his debut against FC Dordrecht after Alvarado was injured.

=== Internacional ===
On 13 July 2023, Internacional officially announced Rochet's signing until December 2026. The Brazilian club agreed to pay a US$1.6 million transfer fee to Nacional. On 8 August 2023, he scored the winning penalty in the shootout against River Plate in the 2023 Copa Libertadores round of 16.

Rochet started the next year with an injured torso, meaning he'd only make his season debut on 25 March as Inter got knocked out by Juventude in the Campeonato Gaúcho semifinals. He'd retain his position as the starting goalkeeper, even as the club suffered the effects of the severe floods in Rio Grande do Sul in May: during this time, Rochet, as well as other players, participated in the relief efforts while football had been postponed.

Rochet missed 12 Internacional matches between June and July while serving Uruguay during the 2024 Copa América in the United States. He would make his team return on 16 July, during a loss to Rosario Central in the Sudamericana Play-Offs. Rochet would then play in 14 times during Internacional's memorable 16-match unbeaten run under manager Roger Machado, which saw the Colorado shoot up the Brasileirão table to 5th place finish. He made his 50th appearance for the club during a 2-2 draw away at Corinthians on 5 October 2024.

== International career ==
On 5 March 2021, Rochet was named in the Uruguay national team's 35-man preliminary squad for 2022 FIFA World Cup qualifying matches against Argentina and Bolivia. However, CONMEBOL suspended those matches next day amid concern over the COVID-19 pandemic. He made his international debut on 27 January 2022 in a 1–0 win against Paraguay.

He was picked for the 2022 World Cup squad and started all three of Uruguay’s games, keeping a clean sheet in two of them. He also saved an André Ayew penalty against Ghana, but it was not enough for Uruguay to qualify for the round of 16.

On 31 May 2026, Rochet was named in Uruguay's 26-man squad for the 2026 FIFA World Cup.

== Career statistics ==
=== Club ===
As of match played 12 May 2026

Appearances and goals by club, season and competition
Club	Season	League			State league		Cup		Continental		Other		Total	
Club	Season	Division	Apps	Goals	Apps	Goals	Apps	Goals	Apps	Goals	Apps	Goals	Apps	Goals
AZ	2014–15	Eredivisie	8	0	—		1	0	—		—		9	0
AZ	2015–16	Eredivisie	23	0	—		2	0	5 (Note: Appearances in UEFA Europa League)	0	—		30	0
AZ	2016–17	Eredivisie	20	0	—		2	0	10	0	0	0	32	0
AZ	Total		51	0	—		5	0	15	0	0	0	71	0
Sivasspor	2017–18	Süper Lig	15	0	—		0	0	—		—		15	0
Sivasspor	2018–19	Süper Lig	0	0	—		0	0	—		—		0	0
Sivasspor	Total		15	0	—		0	0	—		—		15	0
Nacional	2019	Uruguayan Primera División	6	0	—		—		1 (Note: Appearance(s) in Copa Libertadores)	0	0	0	7	0
Nacional	2020	Uruguayan Primera División	29	0	—		—		7	0	3 (Note: Two appearances in championship playoffs, one appearance in Torneo Apertura decider)	0	39	0
Nacional	2021	Uruguayan Primera División	15	0	—		—		6 (Note: Four appearances in Copa Libertadores, two appearances in Copa Sudamericana)	0	1 (Note: Appearance in Supercopa Uruguaya)	0	22	0
Nacional	2022	Uruguayan Primera División	33	0	—		0	0	9 (Note: Five appearances in Copa Libertadores, four appearances in Copa Sudamericana)	0	2 (Note: One appearance in Torneo Intermedio final, one appearance in championship playoff)	0	44	0
Nacional	2023	Uruguayan Primera División	17	0	—		0	0	6	0	1	0	24	0
Nacional	Total		100	0	—		0	0	29	0	7	0	136	0
Internacional	2023	Série A	19	0	—		—		6	0	—		25	0
Internacional	2024	Série A	28	0	1	0	0	0	6 (Note: Appearances in Copa Sudamericana)	0	—		35	0
Internacional	2025	Série A	15	0	0	0	2	0	2	0	—		19	0
Internacional	2026	Série A	11	0	5	0	1	0	—		—		17	0
Internacional	Total		73	0	6	0	3	0	14	0	—		96	0
Career total			239	0	6	0	8	0	58	0	7	0	316	0

=== International ===
As of match played 26 June 2026

Appearances and goals by national team and year
National team	Year	Apps	Goals
Uruguay	2022	11	0
Uruguay	2023	7	0
Uruguay	2024	13	0
Uruguay	2025	3	0
Uruguay	2026	2	0
Total		36	0

== Honours ==
AZ

- KNVB Cup runner-up: 2016–17

Nacional

- Uruguayan Primera División: 2019, 2020, 2022
- Supercopa Uruguaya: 2021

Uruguay

- Copa América third place: 2024

Internacional

- Campeonato Gaúcho: 2025

Individual

- Uruguayan Primera División Team of the Year: 2020, 2021, 2022
