= Gustavo Campanharo =

Brazilian footballer (born 1992)

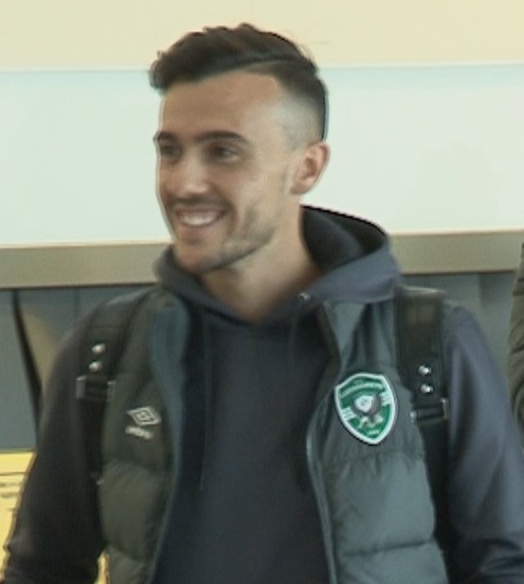

Personal information
- Date of birth: 4 April 1992 (age 34)
- Place of birth: Caxias do Sul, Brazil
- Height: 1.78 m (5 ft 10 in)
- Position: Midfielder

Team information
- Current team: Atlético Goianiense

Youth career
- 2006–2012: Juventude
- 2011–2012: → Fiorentina (loan)

Senior career*
Years	Team	Apps	(Gls)
2009–2013	Juventude	22	(0)
2013–2016	Bragantino	31	(1)
2014–2015	→ Verona (loan)	15	(0)
2015–2016	→ Evian (loan)	32	(3)
2016–2019	Ludogorets Razgrad	69	(6)
2019	Chapecoense	25	(2)
2020–2023	Kayserispor	57	(1)
2023–	Internacional	17	(0)
2024–	→ Atlético Goianiense (loan)	3	(0)
- * Club domestic league appearances and goals as of 18 October 2024

Gustavo Campanharo (born 4 April 1992) is a Brazilian professional footballer who plays as a midfielder for Atlético Goianiense on loan from Internacional.

== Career ==
=== Early career ===
Campanharo started his youth career in Juventude. In 2011, he moved on loan to Fiorentina academy. In 2013, he moved to another Brazilian team, Bragantino.

=== Hellas Verona ===
In September 2014, Gustavo joined Serie A team Verona on a loan deal until the end of the season. He made his debut for the team on 15 September 2014 in a match against Città di Palermo.

=== Evian ===
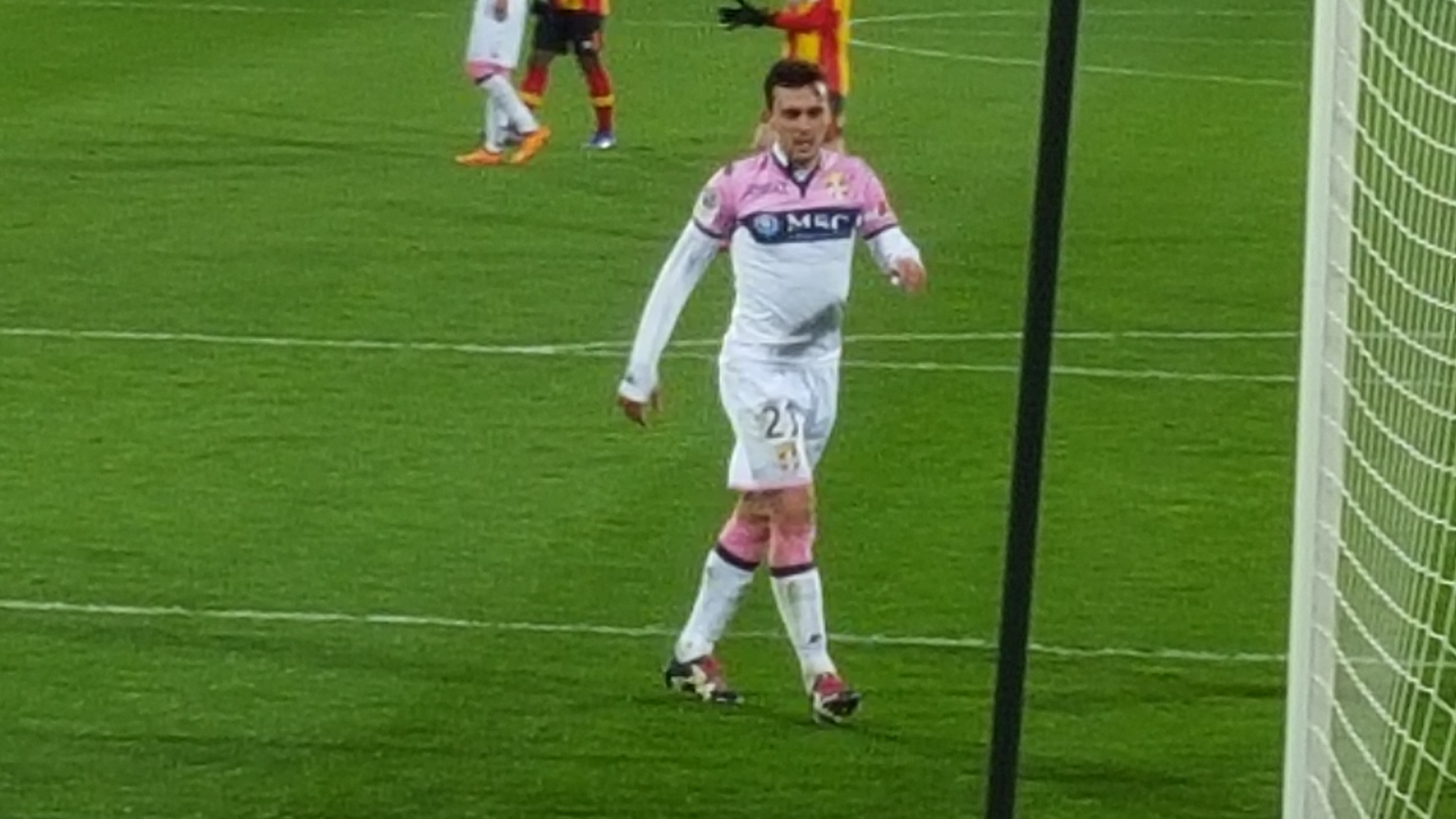
Campanharo with Evian in 2016

On 21 July 2015, Campanharo joined Ligue 2 team Evian on a season long deal. He made his debut for the team on 14 August 2015 in a match against Ajaccio. A month later, on 25 September 2015 he scored his first goal for the team in a match against Bourg en Bresse.

=== Ludogorets Razgrad ===
On 14 June 2016, Campanharo joined Bulgarian First League club Ludogorets Razgrad. On 2 February 2019, after three years in Ludogorets, his contract was ended by due mutual agreement as his contract was ending in the summer of 2019. He left emotional post in social media about the great time he had in Ludogorets and that he would stay a fan of the team whenever he goes.

== Career statistics ==
As of 18 April 2022

Appearances and goals by club, season and competition
Club	Season	League			State League		Cup		Continental		Other		Total	
Club	Season	Division	Apps	Goals	Apps	Goals	Apps	Goals	Apps	Goals	Apps	Goals	Apps	Goals
Juventude	2009	Série B	17	0	0	0	0	0	—		—		17	0
Juventude	2010	Série C	4	0	16	1	1	0	—		—		21	1
Juventude	2011	Série C	0	0	7	0	0	0	—		—		7	0
Juventude	2013	Série D	1	0	6	0	0	0	—		—		7	0
Juventude	Total		22	0	29	1	1	0	—		—		52	1
Bragantino	2013	Série B	21	0	—		—		—		—		21	0
Bragantino	2014	Série B	10	1	15	1	5	0	—		—		30	2
Bragantino	Total		31	1	15	1	5	0	—		—		51	2
Verona (loan)	2014–15	Serie A	15	0	—		2	0	—		—		17	0
Evian (loan)	2015–16	Ligue 2	32	3	—		4	2	—		—		36	5
Ludogorets Razgrad	2016–17	First League	25	2	—		6	2	4 (Note: Appearance(s) in UEFA Champions League)	0	0	0	35	4
Ludogorets Razgrad	2017–18	First League	28	4	—		3	1	9 (Note: One appearance in Bulgarian Supercup; eight appearances in UEFA Europa League)	0	0	0	40	5
Ludogorets Razgrad	2018–19	First League	16	0	—		2	0	11 (Note: Three appearances in Bulgarian Supercup; eight appearances and two goals in UEFA Europa League)	2	1 (Note: Appearance(s) in Bulgarian Supercup)	0	30	2
Ludogorets Razgrad	Total		69	6	—		11	3	24	2	1	0	105	11
Chapecoense	2019	Série A	25	2	6	0	5	1	0	0	—		36	3
Kayserispor	2019–20	Süper Lig	15	0	0	0	1	0	0	0	—		16	0
Kayserispor	2020–21	Süper Lig	24	1	0	0	0	0	0	0	—		24	1
Kayserispor	2021–22	Süper Lig	18	0	0	0	1	0	0	0	—		19	0
Kayserispor	Total		57	1	—		2	0	0	0	0	0	59	1
Career total			251	13	50	2	25	6	24	2	1	0	356	23

== Honours ==
Ludogorets Razgrad

- Bulgarian First League: 2016–17, 2017–18
- Bulgarian Supercup: 2018
