= Nicolás Hernández (Colombian footballer) =

Colombian footballer (born 1998)

Personal information
- Full name: Nicolás Hernández Rodríguez
- Date of birth: 18 January 1998 (age 28)
- Place of birth: Villavicencio, Colombia
- Height: 1.85 m (6 ft 1 in)
- Position: Centre back

Team information
- Current team: América de Cali
- Number: 98

Youth career
- Atlético Nacional

Senior career*
Years	Team	Apps	(Gls)
2018–2021	Atlético Nacional	20	(0)
2018	→ Real Santander (loan)	26	(1)
2019–2020	→ Santa Fe (loan)	20	(0)
2021–2023	Athletico Paranaense	31	(0)
2023	Internacional	23	(0)
2024	San Lorenzo	4	(0)
2024–2025	Banfield	15	(0)
2025–	América de Cali	4	(0)
- * Club domestic league appearances and goals as of 11 December 2025

Nicolás Hernández Rodríguez (born 18 January 1998) is a Colombian footballer who plays as central defender for América de Cali.

== Club career ==
Hernández signed for Athletico Paranaense from Atlético Nacional on 23 August 2021. He won the 2021 Copa Sudamericana with the side, and was also a backup option in their 2022 Copa Libertadores runner-up campaign.

On 23 February 2023, Hernández signed a contract with Internacional until December 2024.

== Career statistics ==
As of 23 February 2023

Club	Season	League			Cup		Continental		Other		Total	
Club	Season	Division	Apps	Goals	Apps	Goals	Apps	Goals	Apps	Goals	Apps	Goals
Atlético Nacional	2017	Categoría Primera A	0	0	0	0	—		—		0	0
Atlético Nacional	2019	Categoría Primera A	17	0	0	0	5 (Note: Four appearances in Copa Libertadores, one appearance in Copa Sudamericana)	0	—		22	0
Atlético Nacional	2020	Categoría Primera A	0	0	1	0	—		—		1	0
Atlético Nacional	2021	Categoría Primera A	3	0	0	0	—		—		3	0
Atlético Nacional	Total		20	0	1	0	5	0	—		26	0
Real Santander (loan)	2018	Categoría Primera B	26	1	0	0	—		—		26	1
Santa Fe (loan)	2019	Categoría Primera A	20	0	2	0	—		—		22	0
Santa Fe (loan)	2020	Categoría Primera A	0	0	0	0	—		—		0	0
Santa Fe (loan)	Total		20	0	2	0	—		—		22	0
Athletico Paranaense	2021	Série A	11	0	3	0	1 (Note: Appearance(s) in Copa Sudamericana)	0	—		15	0
Athletico Paranaense	2022	Série A	20	0	4	0	5 (Note: Appearance(s) in Copa Libertadores)	1	1 (Note: Appearance(s) in Recopa Sudamericana)	0	30	1
Athletico Paranaense	Total		31	0	7	0	6	1	1	0	45	1
Internacional	2023	Série A	0	0	0	0	0	0	—		0	0
Career total			97	1	10	0	11	1	1	0	119	2
