= Igor Gomes (footballer, born 2001) =

Brazilian footballer

Personal information
- Full name: Igor Gomes Silva
- Date of birth: 6 March 2001 (age 25)
- Place of birth: Barra Mansa, Brazil
- Height: 1.85 m (6 ft 1 in)
- Position: Defender

Team information
- Current team: Shabab Al Ahli
- Number: 25

Youth career
- –2019: Coimbra
- 2019–2020: Barcelona

Senior career*
Years	Team	Apps	(Gls)
2020–2022	Barcelona Atlètic	4	(0)
2022–2024	Internacional	40	(2)
2024–	Shabab Al Ahli	22	(1)
- * Club domestic league appearances and goals as of 30 September 2024

Igor Gomes Silva (born 6 March 2001) is a Brazilian footballer who plays as a defender for Shabab Al Ahli.

== Career ==
As a youth player, Gomes joined the youth academy of Coimbra. In 2019, he joined the youth academy of Barcelona in the Spanish La Liga.

In 2022, he signed for Brazilian club Internacional.

In 2024, he transferred to Shabab Al Ahli.
