= Allison =

Allison may refer to:

== People ==
- Allison (given name)
- Allison (surname) (includes a list of people with this name)
- Eugene Allison Smith (1922-1980), American politician and farmer
- Allison family, a family of RMS Titanic passengers

== Companies ==
- Allison Engine Company, American aircraft engine manufacturer
- Allison Transmission, American manufacturer of automatic transmissions and hybrid propulsion systems
- Allison & Allison, American architectural firm
- Allison & Busby, English publishing house
- Cummins Allison, American manufacturer of currency handling and coin handling systems

== Literature ==
- Allison (novel series), a novel and anime series by Keiichi Sigsawa
- Allison, a picture book by Allen Say

== Music ==
- Allison (band), a Mexican pop punk band
  - Allison (album), their 2006 album
- The Allisons, an English pop duo
- The Allisons (American group)
- "Allison", a song by American Hi-Fi from Blood & Lemonade
- "Allison", a 2007 song by Permanent Me from After the Room Clears
- "Allison", a 1990 song by Pixies from Bossanova

== Places ==
=== Antarctica ===
- Allison Bay
- Allison Islands
- Allison Glacier
- Allison Glacier (Heard Island), an ice stream on the west side of Heard Island in the southern Indian Ocean
- Allison Peninsula, Ellsworth Land

=== Canada ===
- Allison Harbour, a natural harbour in British Columbia
- Allison Pass, a highway summit in British Columbia
- Allison, New Brunswick

=== United States ===
- Mount Allison, a mountain near Fremont, California
- Allison, Colorado
- Allison Township, Lawrence County, Illinois
- Allison, Iowa
- Allison Township, Decatur County, Kansas
- Allison, Kansas
- Lake Allison, a temporary lake in the Willamette Valley of Oregon
- Allison, Missouri
- Allison Township, Pennsylvania
- Allison Creek, a stream in South Dakota
- Allison Township, Brown County, South Dakota
- Allison, Texas

== Storms ==
- Tropical Storm Allison (1989)
- Hurricane Allison (1995), a hurricane that made landfall on the Florida Panhandle
- Tropical Storm Allison (2001)

== Other uses ==
- Allison (1795 ship), a ship launched in 1776 that the British captured in 1795
- Mount Allison University, a Canadian university in Sackville, New Brunswick

== See also ==
- Allison Hill (Harrisburg), a neighborhood in Harrisburg, Pennsylvania
- Allison House (disambiguation)
- Allison Park, Pennsylvania, a census-designated place in Allegheny County, Pennsylvania
- Alison (disambiguation)
- Alisoun (disambiguation)
- Allicin, a chemical compound
- Alisson (disambiguation)
- Allisson (disambiguation)
- Alyson, given name
- Allyson, given name
- Alysson, given name
- List of tropical storms named Allison
