= Alison (given name) =

- Pronunciation: /ˈælɪsən/ AL-i-sən
- Gender: Female; Male (in lusophone countries)

Origin
- Meaning: 'little Alice'

Other names
- Variant forms: Alisoun, Alisson, Allisson, Allyson, Allysson, Alyson, Alysson, Alicen, Alycen

Alison is a female given name in English-speaking countries. It was originally a medieval French nickname for Alis / Alys, an old form of Alice derived with the suffix -on or -son sometimes used in the former French nicknames. The Middle English form was Alisoun.

The variant spelling Allison is the most common form in the United States. Other variations include Alisson, Allisson, Allyson, Allysson, Alyson, Alysson, Alicen and Alycen, with nicknames Allie, Alley, Alie, Ali, Ally, Aly, Al, Aley and Alli.

Allison also has separate, disputed roots as a family name. Men were named Allison from the transferred use of surnames as first names.

Alison, variant form Alizon, is also a French surname.

== Popularity ==
The name is first recorded in Scotland in the 12th century. It was popular until the early 19th century and, spelled Allison, was the 45th most common name given to baby girls in the United States in 2005 (Allyson was #253; Alison, #259; Alyson, #468; Allie, #256; Ally, #656; and Alice, #414). In 1990 in the United States, Allison was the 228th most popular name for women of all ages; Alison was No. 347, Allyson, #775; Alyson, #981; Allie, #764; Ali, #2434; and Alice, No. 51. Alison in any spelling did not enter the top 100 baby names in 2005 in England and Wales.

Allison last entered the top 1000 baby names for males in the United States in 1946, when it ranked No. 968. In the 1910s it ranked from 667 to 981, and in the first decade of the 20th century, it ranked as high as No. 927.

In Lusophone countries like Brazil and Portugal, Alison and variant forms are also used as masculine given names.

== People named Alison ==
=== Women ===
- Alison Armitage (born 1965), former swimmer, actress and Playboy Playmate
- Alison Arngrim (born, 1962), American actress
- Alison Bales (born 1985), American basketball player
- Alison Balsom (born 1978), British trumpeter
- Alison Barth, American neuroscientist
- Alison Bechdel (born 1960), American cartoonist
- Allison Baver (born 1980), American Olympic Medalist, American Actress
- Alison Becker (born 1977), American actress
- Alison Bergin (born 2002), Irish rower
- Allison Black, American military officer
- Alison Brie (born 1982), American actress
- Alison Burton (1921–2014), Australian tennis player
- Alison Calder (born 1969), Canadian poet and literary critic
- Allison Chamberlain, American infectious disease epidemiologist
- Alison Chapman-Andrews (born 1942), English-Barbadian painter and artist
- Alison Carroll, English gymnast, model and actress
- Alison Chase (born 1946), American dance instructor
- Alison H. Clarkson (born 1955), American politician
- Alison Doody (born 1966), Irish actress and model
- Allison Feldman, American murder victim
- Allison Fisher, English professional pool champion
- Allison Fong, American oceanographer
- Alison Fuller, British educational researcher
- Alison Goldfrapp (born 1966), English musician and record producer
- Allison Gollust, American media executive
- Alison Halford (1940–2025), Welsh senior police officer and politician
- Alison Hall (1910–2004), New Zealand cricket player and scorer
- Allison Halverson (born 1992), Armenian heptathlete
- Alison Hammond (born 1975), English television personality
- Allison G. Harvey, Australian clinical psychologist and researcher
- Allison Hepler, American politician
- Alison Hewson (born 1961), Irish businesswoman and wife of Bono
- Alison Hinds (born 1970), British-born Barbadian soca singer
- Allison Holker (born 1988), American dancer
- Alison Horner (born 1966), British businesswoman
- Alison Howie (born 1991), Scottish field hockey player
- Alison Humby (born 1972), English badminton player
- Allison Janney (born 1959), American actress
- Alison King (born 1973), English actress
- Alison Kinnaird (born 1949), Scottish musician, sculptor and teacher
- Alison Knowles (1933–2025), American visual artist
- Alison Knowles (rower) (born 1982), British rower
- Alison Kosik (born 1971), news journalist for the Cable News Network (CNN)
- Alison Krauss (born 1971), American musician
- Alison Lepin (born 2000), French artistic gymnast
- Alison Lester (born 1952), Australian author and illustrator
- Alison Levine (born 1966), American mountain climber
- Alison Levine (boccia) (born 1990), Canadian Paralympian
- Alison Lohman (born 1979), American actress
- Alison Lurie (1926–2020), American novelist and academic
- Allison Mack (born 1982), American actress and criminal
- Alison Marr, American mathematician
- Alison Marsden, American bioengineer
- Alison Merrien, British indoor bowls player
- Alison Mitchell, English sports broadcaster
- Alison Mowbray (born 1971), British former rower
- Alison Moyet (born 1961), English singer and songwriter
- Allison Munn (born 1974), American actress
- Alison R.H. Narayan (born 1984), American chemistry professor
- Alison Oliver (born 1997), Irish actress
- Alison Palmer (born 1931), American priest and diplomat
- Alison Parker (1991–2015), American news reporter, murdered on television
- Alison Peasgood (born 1987), British paratriathlete
- Alison Penfold, Australian politician
- Alison Blomfield Pickmere (1908–1971), New Zealand secretary of the interior
- Alison Pill (born 1985), Canadian actress
- Allison Pohlman (born 1977), American collegiate basketball player and coach
- Alison Quinn (born 1977), Australian Paralympic athlete
- Alison Riske-Amritraj (born 1990), inactive American tennis player
- Alison Ramsay (born 1982), former Scottish female international cricketer
- Alison Ramsay (born 1959) former female Scottish field hockey player
- Alison Redford (born 1965), Canadian lawyer and politician
- Alison Robins (1920–2017), worked at Bletchley Park "Y-Service"
- Allison Sansom (born 1994), Thai model
- Alison Saunders (born 1961), former Director of Public Prosecutions (England and Wales)
- Allison Scagliotti (born 1990), American actress
- Allison Schmitt (born 1990), American competition swimmer
- Alison Schumacher (born 2002), Canadian figure skater
- Alison Schwagmeyer (born 1990), American former basketball player
- Alison Sealy-Smith (born 1959), Barbadian actress
- Alison Shrubsole (1925–2002), British educationist and university administrator
- Alison Sinclair (literary critic) (born 1946), British Hispanist
- Alison Steadman (born 1946), English actress
- Alison Stewart (born 1966), American Journalist and author
- Alison Stone (philosopher), (born 1972), British philosopher
- Alison Sudol (born 1984), American musician and actress
- Alison Sweeney (born 1976), American actress
- Allison Tant (born 1961), American politician
- Alison Joan Tierney CBE (born 1948) British nursing theorist, nurse researcher
- Alison Van Uytvanck (born 1994), Belgian former professional tennis player
- Alison Walker (scientist), English physicist
- Alison Weir (born 1951), English author and historian
- Allison Williams (born 1988), American actress, comedian, and singer
- Alison Williamson (born 1971), English archer
- Alison Yu (born 1984), wheelchair fencer from Hong Kong
- Alison Zerafa Civelli, Maltese politician

=== Men ===
- Alisson Becker (born 1992), Brazilian footballer
- Allison Blakely (born 1940), American academic historian
- Allison Clark Bonnell (1801–1875), commonly known as A. C. Bonnell, American politician and businessman
- Allison Brooks (1917–2006), American Air Force aviator
- Allison Burnett (born 1958), American screenwriter
- Allison G. Catheron (1878–1950), Canadian-born American politician
- Alison Cerutti (born 1985), Brazilian beach volleyball player
- Allison Danzig (1898–1987), American sports journalist
- Allison Davis (1902–1983), American educator, anthropologist, writer, researcher, and scholar
- Allison DeLong (1940–2014), Canadian politician
- Allison Dysart (1880–1962), Canadian politician, lawyer and judge
- Alison Lopes Ferreira (born 1993), commonly known as Alison, Brazilian former footballer
- Allison Green (1911–2005), American politician
- Allison B. Humphreys (1906–1993), former justice of the Tennessee Supreme Court
- Allison Madueke, Nigerian politician * Allison Norville, female Barbadian gospel singer
- Alison Henrique Mira (born 1995), commonly known as Alison, Brazilian footballer
- Alison Felipe dos Santos Natividade (born 1998), commonly known as Alison, Brazilian footballer
- Allison Patrício (born 1986), Brazilian footballer
- Allison Amos Pettengill (1808–1882), American politician and newspaper editor
- Allison Deforest Pickett (1900–1991), Canadian entomologist
- Alison dos Santos (born 2000), Brazilian athlete
- Allison Tatham-Warter (1917–1992), commonly known as Digby Tatham-Warter, British Army officer
- Alison White (1881–1962), English cricketer

=== Fictional ===
- Allison Argent, a character in the TV Series Teen Wolf
- Alison Crestmere, a name once used for the Marvel Comics character Magma
- Alison DiLaurentis, a character in the Pretty Little Liars book series, as well as its eponymous TV adaption.
- Allison Hargreeves, main character in the comic book/Netflix series The Umbrella Academy

== See also ==
- Alison (disambiguation)
- Allie (given name)
- Alice
- Allison (surname)
- Allyson (given name and surname)
- Alyson
