= Allason =

Allason is a surname. Notable people with the surname include:

- Ernesto Allason (1822–1868), Italian painter
- James Allason OBE (1912–2011), British Conservative Party politician, sportsman, and former military planner
- Rupert Allason (born 1951), military historian and former Conservative Party politician in the United Kingdom
- Silvio Allason (1845–1912), Italian painter mainly of landscapes & seascapes
- Thomas Allason (1790–1852), English architect, surveyor and landscaper
- Tom Allason, founder of Ecourier, a UK courier service
- Walter Allason DSO (1875–1960), award-winning swimmer, diver, Brigadier-General and World War I hero

== See also ==
- Lindsay Allason-Jones, British archaeologist and museum professional
- Richard Bannatine-Allason (1855–1940), senior British Army officer
- Robert Allason Furness (1883–1954), Professor of English at Cairo University
- Alazon
- Alison (disambiguation)
- Allison (disambiguation)
- Allyson
- Alyson

Media related to Allason (surname) at Wikimedia Commons
