= 2026 Sport Club Internacional season =

Internacional
2026 season
- President: Alessandro Barcellos
- Head coach: Paulo Pezzolano (until 20 September); Eduardo Baptista (from 23 September)
- Stadium: Beira-Rio
- Campeonato Brasileiro Série A: 16th
- Campeonato Gaúcho: Runners-up
- Copa do Brasil: Quarter-finals
- Recopa Gaúcha: Winners
- Top goalscorer: League: Johan Carbonero (7); All: Alexandro Bernabei (10)
Home colours	Away colours	Third colours

The 2026 season is Sport Club Internacional's 116th season in existence. As well as the Campeonato Brasileiro Série A, the club competes in the Copa do Brasil, the Campeonato Gaúcho and the Recopa Gaúcha.

== First team ==
As of 25 July 2026

Note: Flags indicate national team as defined under FIFA eligibility rules; some limited exceptions apply. Players may hold more than one non-FIFA nationality.

No.	Pos.	Nation	Player
1	GK	URU	Sergio Rochet
3	DF	CHI	Guillermo Maripán
4	DF	ECU	Félix Torres (on loan from Corinthians)
5	MF	ARG	Rodrigo Villagra (on loan from CSKA Moscow)
6	DF	BRA	Matheus Bahia
7	FW	COL	Johan Carbonero
8	MF	BRA	Bruno Henrique
9	FW	BRA	Alerrandro (on loan from CSKA Moscow)
10	MF	BRA	Alan Patrick (captain)
11	FW	BRA	Kayky (on loan from Bahia)
12	GK	BRA	Anthoni
14	MF	URU	Alan Rodríguez
15	DF	BRA	Bruno Gomes
16	MF	BRA	Ronaldo

No.	Pos.	Nation	Player
18	DF	BRA	Juninho
20	DF	BRA	Clayton Sampaio
22	GK	BRA	Kauan Jesus
25	DF	ARG	Gabriel Mercado (vice-captain)
26	DF	ARG	Alexandro Bernabei
27	MF	BRA	Paulinho
28	FW	BRA	Vitinho (on loan from Dynamo Kyiv)
29	MF	BRA	Thiago Maia
32	GK	BRA	Diego Esser
35	DF	ARG	Braian Aguirre
36	MF	BRA	Richard
41	DF	BRA	Victor Gabriel
—	MF	BRA	Calebe (on loan from Fortaleza)

=== Youth players ===
Note: Flags indicate national team as defined under FIFA eligibility rules; some limited exceptions apply. Players may hold more than one non-FIFA nationality.

No.	Pos.	Nation	Player
30	DF	BRA	Alisson
31	MF	BRA	Allex
33	MF	GHA	Benjamin Arhin
34	FW	BRA	Leandro Kauã (on loan from Náutico)
37	FW	BRA	Yago Noal
38	FW	BRA	Diego Coser
39	FW	BRA	Carlos Eduardo
40	DF	BRA	Lázaro
42	DF	BRA	Pablo

No.	Pos.	Nation	Player
44	FW	BRA	João Victor
45	DF	BRA	Yan Henrique (on loan from Guarani)
46	DF	BRA	Pedro Kauã
48	FW	BRA	Raykkonen
49	FW	BRA	João Bezerra
50	MF	BRA	Kauan Alves
51	MF	BRA	Kempes
53	DF	BRA	Luiz Felipe
—	DF	BRA	João Dalla Corte

== Competitions ==
=== Overview ===
Competition	First match	Last match	Starting round	Final position	Record							
Competition	First match	Last match	Starting round	Final position	Pld	W	D	L	GF	GA	GD	Win %
Série A	28 January 2026	2 December 2026	Matchday 1	TBD	34	9	11	14	38	42	−4	26.47
Campeonato Gaúcho	11 January 2026	8 March 2026	Group stage	Runners-up	11	8	1	2	25	10	+15	72.73
Copa do Brasil	22 April 2026	3 September 2026	Fifth round	Quarter-finals	6	3	1	2	9	8	+1	50.00
Recopa Gaúcha	6 May 2026		Final	Winners	1	1	0	0	2	1	+1	100.00
Total					52	21	13	18	74	61	+13	40.38

Last updated: 3 November 2026
Source: Competitions

=== Campeonato Gaúcho ===
==== Group A ====
Pos	Team	Pld	W	D	L	GF	GA	GD	Pts	Qualification or relegation
1	Internacional	6	5	0	1	14	5	+9	15	Knockout stage
2	Juventude	6	3	3	0	8	3	+5	12	Knockout stage
3	São José	6	2	3	1	4	3	+1	9	Knockout stage
4	São Luiz	6	1	4	1	6	10	−4	7	Knockout stage
5	Avenida	6	1	2	3	4	9	−5	5	Relegation stage
6	Guarany de Bagé	6	1	2	3	4	10	−6	5	Relegation stage

Source: FGF

==== Matches ====
11 January 2026 1	Internacional	2–1	Novo Hamburgo	Porto Alegre
18:00	João Marcus 61' (o.g.); Diego Coser 86'	Report	Allison 8'	Stadium: Beira-Rio; Attendance: 12,924; Referee: Elias da Silva Elyseu

15 January 2026 2	Monsoon	0–4	Internacional	Porto Alegre
19:00		Report	João Victor 37'; Borré 60', 80'; Allex 86'	Stadium: Passo D'Areia; Attendance: 1,662; Referee: Tiago Lemos Clasen

18 January 2026 3	Ypiranga	2–1	Internacional	Erechim
18:00	Nicolas Schulz 83'; Renan Gorne 90+4' (pen.)	Report	Bruno Henrique 17'	Stadium: Colosso da Lagoa; Attendance: 4,353; Referee: Eduardo Fernandes Bastos

21 January 2026 4	Internacional	2–0	Internacional de Santa Maria	Porto Alegre
19:00	Alan Patrick 6' (pen.); Félix Torres 90+2'	Report		Stadium: Beira-Rio; Attendance: 10,996; Referee: Allan Ricardo Freitas da Rosa Azevedo

25 January 2026 5	Internacional	4–2	Grêmio	Porto Alegre
20:00	Marcos Rocha 10' (o.g.); Borré 74', 76'; Bernabei 82'	Report	Amuzu 5'; Edenilson 66'	Stadium: Beira-Rio; Attendance: 32,411; Referee: Lucas Guimarães Rechatiko Horn

31 January 2026 6	Caxias	0–1	Internacional	Caxias do Sul
16:30		Report	Gustavo Prado 58'	Stadium: Centenário; Attendance: 4,230; Referee: Érico Andrade de Carvalho

==== Knockout stage ====
===== Quarter-finals =====
8 February 2026 Single match	Internacional	3–1	São Luiz	Porto Alegre
18:00	Aguirre 3'; Bernabei 61'; Vitinho 88'	Report	Felipe Rangel 4'	Stadium: Beira-Rio; Attendance: 16,669; Referee: Anderson Daronco

===== Semi-finals =====
15 February 2026 First leg	Ypiranga	0–3	Internacional	Erechim
20:30		Report	Brian Aguirre 3'; Thiago Maia 36'; Zé Carlos 78' (o.g.)	Stadium: Colosso da Lagoa; Attendance: 6,209; Referee: Lucas Guimarães Rechatiko Horn

21 February 2026 Second leg	Internacional	4–0 (7–0 agg.)	Ypiranga	Porto Alegre
18:30	Borré 8'; Vitinho 67', 72'; Alerrandro 81'	Report		Stadium: Beira-Rio; Attendance: 22,123; Referee: Tiago Pires Staduto

===== Finals =====
1 March 2026 First leg	Grêmio	3–0	Internacional	Porto Alegre
18:00	Enamorado 39'; Amuzu 45+1'; Victor Gabriel 67' (o.g.)	Report		Stadium: Arena do Grêmio; Attendance: 50,166; Referee: Anderson Daronco

8 March 2026 Second leg	Internacional	1–1 (1–4 agg.)	Grêmio	Porto Alegre
18:00	Alan Patrick 82' (pen.)	Report	Gustavo Martins 45+9'	Stadium: Beira-Rio; Attendance: 41,251; Referee: Rafael Rodrigo Klein

=== Recopa Gaúcha ===
6 May 2026 Final	Brasil (PE)	1–2	Internacional	Pelotas
20:00	Lula 76'	Report	Vitinho 82'; Borré 90'	Stadium: Bento Freitas; Attendance: 4,902; Referee: Francisco Soares Dias

=== Serie A ===
Pos	Team	Pld	W	D	L	GF	GA	GD	Pts	Qualification or relegation
15	Mirassol	35	10	11	14	39	48	−9	41	
16	Corinthians	35	10	10	15	40	42	−2	40	
17	Internacional	35	9	11	15	39	44	−5	38	Relegation to Campeonato Brasileiro Série B
18	Grêmio (Note: Grêmio qualified for the Copa Libertadores group stage as 2026 Copa do Brasil champions or runners-up. If they are relegated, their berth will be passed to the Série A's highest-placed team not already qualified.)	35	9	11	15	38	47	−9	38	Relegation to Campeonato Brasileiro Série B
19	Remo	35	7	11	17	39	57	−18	32	Relegation to Campeonato Brasileiro Série B

Updated to match(es) played on 19 November 2026 (2 of 3 matches finished). Source: CBF
Rules for classification: 1) points; 2) wins; 3) goal difference; 4) goals scored; 5) head-to-head results (only between two teams); 6) fewest red cards; 7) fewest yellow cards; 8) drawing of lots.

==== Results summary ====
Overall								Home						Away					
Pld	W	D	L	GF	GA	GD	Pts	W	D	L	GF	GA	GD	W	D	L	GF	GA	GD
35	9	11	15	39	44	−5	38	6	5	6	22	17	+5	3	6	9	17	27	−10

==== Results by round ====
Round	1	2	3	4	5	6	7	8	9	10	11	12	13	14	15	16	17	18	19	20	21	22	23	24	25	26	27	28	29	30	31	32	33	34	35
Ground	H	A	H	A	A	H	A	H	H	A	H	H	A	H	A	H	A	A	H	A	H	A	H	H	A	H	A	A	H	A	A	H	A	H	A
Result	L	D	L	D	L	L	W	W	D	W	D	L	D	W	D	W	L	L	L	L	D	D	D	D	L	L	W	L	W	D	L	W	L	W	L
Position	16	17	19	18	19	20	17	12	16	13	14	14	16	12	14	11	13	14	14	16	17	18	17	17	18	18	18	18	17	17	17	16	18	16	17
Points	0	1	1	2	2	2	5	8	9	12	13	13	14	17	18	21	21	21	21	21	22	23	24	25	25	25	28	28	31	32	32	35	35	38	38

Updated to match(es) played on 3 November 2026. Source:
A = Away; H = Home; W = Win; D = Draw; L = Loss

==== Matches ====
The league fixtures was announced on 16 December 2025.

28 January 2026 1	Internacional	0–1	Athletico Paranaense	Porto Alegre
19:00		Report	Mendoza 9'	Stadium: Beira-Rio; Attendance: 17,059; Referee: Flávio Rodrigues de Souza

4 February 2026 2	Flamengo	1–1	Internacional	Rio de Janeiro
19:00	De Arrascaeta 68' (pen.)	Report	Borré 45+3'	Stadium: Maracanã; Attendance: 56,421; Referee: Rodrigo José Pereira de Lima

12 February 2026 3	Internacional	1–3	Palmeiras	Porto Alegre
21:30	Ronaldo 36'	Report	Gómez 23'; Vitor Roque 52'; Andreas Pereira 82'	Stadium: Beira-Rio; Attendance: 20,082; Referee: Davi de Oliveira Lacerda

25 February 2026 4	Remo	1–1	Internacional	Belém
19:00	Picco 14'	Report	Alan Patrick 4'	Stadium: Mangueirão; Attendance: 21,687; Referee: Bruno Arleu de Araújo

11 March 2026 5	Atlético Mineiro	1–0	Internacional	Belo Horizonte
19:00	Cuello 2'	Report		Stadium: Arena MRV; Attendance: 10,132; Referee: Ramon Abatti Abel

15 March 2026 6	Internacional	0–1	Bahia	Porto Alegre
16:00		Report	Willian José 23'	Stadium: Beira-Rio; Attendance: 16,574; Referee: Fernando Antônio Mendes de Salles Nascimento Filho

18 March 2026 7	Santos	1–2	Internacional	Santos
21:30	Neymar 57' (pen.)	Report	Zé Ivaldo 47' (o.g.); Carbonero 90+5'	Stadium: Vila Belmiro; Attendance: 10,031; Referee: Davi de Oliveira Lacerda

22 March 2026 8	Internacional	2–0	Chapecoense	Porto Alegre
18:30	Mercado 28'; Alan Patrick 51' (pen.)	Report		Stadium: Beira-Rio; Attendance: 16,736; Referee: Bruno Arleu de Araújo

1 April 2026 9	Internacional	1–1	São Paulo	Porto Alegre
19:30	Alerrandro 24'	Report	Calleri 81'	Stadium: Beira-Rio; Attendance: 14,780; Referee: Lucas Casagrande

5 April 2026 10	Corinthians	0–1	Internacional	São Paulo
19:30		Report	Bernabei 78'	Stadium: Neo Química Arena; Attendance: 32,437; Referee: Felipe Fernandes de Lima

11 April 2026 11	Internacional	0–0	Grêmio	Porto Alegre
20:30		Report		Stadium: Beira-Rio; Attendance: 39,135; Referee: Bruno Arleu de Araújo

19 April 2026 12	Internacional	1–2	Mirassol	Porto Alegre
11:00	Alan Patrick 90+3'	Report	Lucas Oliveira 22'; André Luis 45'	Stadium: Beira-Rio; Attendance: 30,052; Referee: Davi de Oliveira Lacerda

25 April 2026 13	Botafogo	2–2	Internacional	Brasília
18:30	Danilo 54'; Medina 65'	Report	Carbonero 59'; Bernabei 74'	Stadium: Mané Garrincha; Attendance: 16,332; Referee: Fernando Antônio Mendes de Salles Nascimento Filho

3 May 2026 14	Internacional	2–0	Fluminense	Porto Alegre
18:30	Bernabei 39'; Alerrandro 49'	Report		Stadium: Beira-Rio; Attendance: 16,173; Referee: Felipe Fernandes de Lima

9 May 2026 15	Coritiba	2–2	Internacional	Curitiba
16:00	Lavega 28'; Moledo 84'	Report	Borré 69'; Félix Torres 90+6'	Stadium: Couto Pereira; Attendance: 15,972; Referee: Wagner do Nascimento Magalhães

16 May 2026 16	Internacional	4–1	Vasco	Porto Alegre
18:30	Carbonero 20', 70'; Alerrandro 23'; Bernabei 61'	Report	Andrés Gómez 84'	Stadium: Beira-Rio; Attendance: 21,411; Referee: Ramon Abatti Abel

23 May 2026 17	Vitória	2–0	Internacional	Salvador
17:00	Renê 28'; Tarzia 90+6'	Report		Stadium: Barradão; Attendance: 25,114; Referee: Felipe Fernandes de Lima

31 May 2026 18	Red Bull Bragantino	3–1	Internacional	Bragança Paulista
11:00	Fernando 18'; Juninho Capixaba 45+8'; Volpi 52' (pen.)	Report	Aguirre 79'	Stadium: Cícero de Souza Marques; Attendance: 5,559; Referee: Alex Gomes Stefano

22 July 2026 19	Internacional	1–2	Cruzeiro	Porto Alegre
21:30	Carbonero 83'	Report	Kaio Jorge 11'; Matheus Pereira 64'	Stadium: Beira-Rio; Attendance: 12,266; Referee: Flávio Rodrigues de Souza

25 July 2026 20	Athletico Paranaense	2–0	Internacional	Curitiba
18:30	Leozinho 45+1'; Viveros 60'	Report		Stadium: Arena da Baixada; Attendance: 27,692; Referee: Rodrigo José Pereira de Lima

29 July 2026 21	Internacional	1–1	Flamengo	Porto Alegre
19:30	Vitinho 27'	Report	Samuel Lino 79'	Stadium: Beira-Rio; Attendance: 18,359; Referee: Matheus Delgado Candançan

9 August 2026 22	Palmeiras	0–0	Internacional	São Paulo
16:00		Report		Stadium: Nubank Parque; Attendance: 38,778; Referee: Davi de Oliveira Lacerda

17 August 2026 23	Internacional	1–1	Remo	Porto Alegre
20:00	Carbonero 3'	Report	Vitor Bueno 90+5'	Stadium: Beira-Rio; Attendance: 29,614; Referee: Edina Alves Batista

22 August 2026 24	Internacional	0–0	Atlético Mineiro	Porto Alegre
18:30		Report		Stadium: Beira-Rio; Attendance: 20,464; Referee: Lucas Casagrande

30 August 2026 25	Bahia	3–2	Internacional	Salvador
19:30	Erick Pulga 23', 42'; Erick 45+4'	Report	Alan Patrick 16'; Vitinho 52'	Stadium: Arena Fonte Nova; Attendance: 31,117; Referee: Paulo César Zanovelli da Silva

6 September 2026 26	Internacional	2–3	Santos	Porto Alegre
16:00	Aguirre 48'; Bruno Henrique 90+1' (pen.)	Report	Gabriel 8', 29' (pen.); Oliva 39'	Stadium: Beira-Rio; Attendance: 24,441; Referee: Alex Gomes Stefano

12 September 2026 27	Chapecoense	1–2	Internacional	Chapecó
17:00	Garcez 45+1'	Report	Bruno Henrique 25'; Carbonero 67'	Stadium: Arena Condá; Attendance: 17,152; Referee: Flávio Rodrigues de Souza

19 September 2026 28	São Paulo	1–0	Internacional	São Paulo
21:00	Calleri 15' (pen.)	Report		Stadium: Morumbi; Attendance: 25,395; Referee: Bruno Arleu de Araújo

7 October 2026 29	Internacional	2–1	Corinthians	Porto Alegre
19:30	Vitinho 1'; Alan Patrick 77'	Report	André 80'	Stadium: Beira-Rio; Attendance: 27,566; Referee: Felipe Fernandes de Lima

11 October 2026 30	Grêmio	1–1	Internacional	Porto Alegre
17:30	Wallace 73'	Report	Vitinho 33'	Stadium: Arena do Grêmio; Attendance: 53,134; Referee: Rodrigo José Pereira de Lima

16 October 2026 31	Mirassol	2–0	Internacional	Mirassol
20:00	Carlos Eduardo 48'; André Luis 87'	Report		Stadium: José Maria de Campos Maia; Attendance: 5,931; Referee: Bruno Arleu de Araújo

24 October 2026 32	Internacional	3–0	Botafogo	Porto Alegre
16:30	Matheus Bahia 32'; Juninho 42'; Bernabei 66'	Report		Stadium: Beira-Rio; Attendance: 34,287; Referee: Davi de Oliveira Lacerda

28 October 2026 33	Fluminense	2–1	Internacional	Rio de Janeiro
19:30	Hércules 78'; Acosta 90+7'	Report	Alan Patrick 46'	Stadium: Maracanã; Attendance: 12,282; Referee: Lucas Casagrande

3 November 2026 34	Internacional	1–0	Coritiba	Porto Alegre
21:30	Alerrandro 90+5' (pen.)	Report		Stadium: Beira-Rio; Attendance: 36,412; Referee: Fernando Antônio Mendes de Salles Nascimento

19 November 2026 35	Vasco	v	Internacional	Rio de Janeiro
19:30		Report		Stadium: São Januário

23 November 2026 36	Internacional	v	Vitória	Porto Alegre
19:30		Report		Stadium: Beira-Rio

28–29 November 2026 37	Internacional	v	Red Bull Bragantino	Porto Alegre
--:--		Report		Stadium: Beira-Rio

2 December 2026 38	Cruzeiro	v	Internacional	Belo Horizonte
--:--		Report		Stadium: Mineirão

=== Copa do Brasil ===
==== Fifth round ====
22 April 2026 First leg	Athletic Club	1–2	Internacional	Florianópolis
20:30 UTC−3	Kauan 16'	Report	Bruno Henrique 32'; Bernabei 63'	Stadium: Orlando Scarpelli; Attendance: 5,198; Referee: Flávio Rodrigues de Souza

12 May 2026 Second leg	Internacional	3–2 (5–3 agg.)	Athletic Club	Porto Alegre
19:30 UTC−3	Borré 21'; Allex 44'; Bernabei 69'	Report	Ian Luccas 39', 67'	Stadium: Beira-Rio; Attendance: 8,702; Referee: Lucas Casagrande

==== Round of 16 ====
2 August 2026 First leg	Internacional	2–0	Corinthians	Porto Alegre
19:30 UTC−3	Matheus Bahia 61'; Alan Patrick 67' (pen.)	Report		Stadium: Beira-Rio; Attendance: 30,864; Referee: Alex Gomes Stefano

6 August 2026 Second leg	Corinthians	2–1 (2–3 agg.)	Internacional	São Paulo
20:00 UTC−3	Gustavo Henrique 43'; Pedro Raul 70'	Report	Bernabei 59'	Stadium: Neo Química Arena; Attendance: 45,126; Referee: Felipe Fernandes de Lima

==== Quarter-finals ====
27 August 2026 First leg	Internacional	0–0	Grêmio	Porto Alegre
20:00 UTC−3		Report		Stadium: Beira-Rio; Attendance: 43,970; Referee: Ramon Abatti Abel

3 September 2026 Second leg	Grêmio	3–1 (3–1 agg.)	Internacional	Porto Alegre
20:00 UTC−3	Carlos Vinícius 14', 22'; Krovinović 68'	Report	Vitinho 79'	Stadium: Arena do Grêmio; Attendance: 55,376; Referee: Bruno Arleu de Araújo
