= Alysson =

Alysson is a masculine or feminine given name, a variant form of Alison. Notable people with the name include:

Men:

- Alysson Paolinelli (1936–2023), Brazilian agronomic engineer and public official
- Alysson (footballer, born 1976), Alysson Marendaz Marins, Brazilian football striker
- Alysson (footballer, born 1978), Alysson Ramos da Silva, Brazilian football left-back
- Alysson (footballer, born 2002), Alysson Cristian Oliveira Silva, Brazilian football centre-back for Santa Clara
- Alysson (footballer, born 2006), Alysson Edward Franco da Rocha dos Santos, Brazilian football forward for Aston Villa

Woman:

- Alysson Paradis (born 1982), French actress

== See also ==
- Alysson, a genus of crabronid wasps
- Alyson, given name
- Allyson, given name
- Alisson (disambiguation)
