= Allison Township =

Allison Township may refer to the following townships in the United States:

- Allison Township, Lawrence County, Illinois
- Allison Township, Decatur County, Kansas
- Allison Township, Pennsylvania
- Allison Township, Brown County, South Dakota
