= Alisoun =

Alisoun (pronounced [alisuːn]) is a given name, a variant form of Alison. It may refer to:

- Two characters in The Canterbury Tales:
  - The Wife of Bath
  - A character in The Miller's Tale

== See also ==
- Alison (disambiguation)
- Allison (disambiguation)
- Alyson
- Allyson (disambiguation)
