= Take a Good Look =

Take a Good Look may refer to:

- Take a Good Look (album), an album by Alyson
- Take a Good Look (TV series), an American television game show
- Take a Good Look (novel), a 1990 children's novel by Jacqueline Wilson
