= Allison, Texas =

Allison, Texas may refer to the following places:

- Allison, Wheeler County, Texas
- Allison, Williamson County, Texas
- Allison, Wise County, Texas

== See also ==
- Allison (disambiguation)
