= Allison White (disambiguation) =

Allison White (1816–1886) was a U.S. representative from Pennsylvania.

Allison or Alison White or Whyte may also refer to:

- Allison Benis White, American poet
- Alison White (cricketer) (1881–1962), English soldier and cricketer
- Alison White (bishop) (born 1956), British Anglican bishop
- Alison Whyte (born 1968), Australian actress
- Allison White, a character in the TV series The Colony
