= Alison =

Alison may refer to:

== People ==
- Alison (given name), including a list of people with the name
- Alison (surname)

== Music ==
- Alison (album), a.k.a. Excuse Me, a 1975 album by Australian singer Alison MacCallum
- "Alison" (song), song by Elvis Costello
- "Alison (C'est ma copine à moi)", a 1993 single by Jordy
- "Alison", 1994 single by Slowdive

== Places ==
- Alison, New South Wales, suburb of the Central Coast region in NSW, Australia
- Alison Sound, an inlet on the Central Coast of British Columbia, Canada
- Point Alison, Alberta, a summer village in Alberta, Canada

== Other uses ==
- Alison (film), a South African documentary film
- Alison (company), an Irish educational technology company
- Alison, common name for plants of the genus Alyssum, including:
  - Sweet alison, a decorative plant
- Alison (katydid) a genus in the Hexacentrinae subfamily of bush crickets

== See also ==
- Alisoun (disambiguation)
- Alisson (disambiguation)
- Allison (disambiguation)
- Allisson (disambiguation)
- Allie
