= Any Way You Want Me =

"Any Way You Want Me" (or "Anyway You Want Me") may refer to:

- "Any Way You Want Me" (Elvis Presley song), a 1956 song by Elvis Presley
- "Anyway You Want Me" (Rednex song), a 2007 song by Rednex
- "Any Way That You Want Me", song written by Chip Taylor, covered by the Troggs, the American Breed, Evie Sands
- Any Way You Want Me, the re-issue title of the album Fresh Water by Alison McCallum
  - "Any Way You Want Me" (Alison McCallum song), a song from the above album
