= Alison MacCallum =

Australian rock singer (born 1951)

- Born: 7 April 1951 (age 75); Sydney, New South Wales, Australia
- Genres: Rock, blues, soul
- Occupation: Singer
- Instrument: Vocals
- Years active: 1967–1979
- Labels: RCA, Albert/EMI
- Formerly of: Geoff Bull Jazz Band, Big Apple Union, Dr Kandy's Third Eye, This Hallelujah Chorus, Tully, Freshwater, Ray Brown's One Ton Gypsy, Hooter Sisters

Alison MacCallum (born 7 April 1951), also written Alison McCallum, is an Australian rock singer from the late 1960s and 1970s. Her two studio albums are Fresh Water (March 1972) and Excuse Me (October 1975). In March 1972 she issued her most successful charting single, "Superman", which peaked at No. 12 on Go-Set's National Top 40. In August that year MacCallum provided lead vocals for the Labor Party's campaign theme song, "It's Time", for the 1972 election. By the late 1970s, she had concentrated on session work and then "disappeared from public view". According to Australian musicologist, Ian McFarlane, MacCallum was "a soul/blues stylist of considerable flair and passion". In September 2014 Sony released a 2× CD compilation album, The Essential Alison MacCallum.

== Early career ==
Alison MacCallum was born on 7 April 1951 and raised in Maroubra, a Sydney suburb. She began her music career in 1967, at the age of 16, as the singer in a succession of Sydney bands. Her influences include Ma Rainey, Bessie Smith, Clara Ward and Marianne Williams. She began with the Geoff Bull Jazz Band, and the York Gospel Singers. She soon joined the Big Apple Union, a soul band, which evolved into Dr Kandy's Third Eye, in which she shared lead vocals with Gulliver Smith, (later of Company Caine). In June 1969, MacCallum joined a seven-piece blue-eyed soul band, This Hallelujah Chorus, sharing lead vocals with Ed Mayne. Also during that year she recorded a cover version of The Bee Gees track "To Love Somebody" with Tully for the ABC-TV show Fusions. However, it was not released commercially until 1979 on the various artists' compilation album, Alberts Archives, selected by Glenn A. Baker.

At the end of 1970 MacCallum joined Freshwater, a soul-pop band, which had formed in New Zealand in 1968. They had achieved notoriety for their controversial May 1970 single, "Satan" / "Satan's Woman" – about the Sharon Tate murders. Initially sharing lead vocals with Ian Johnson, by September 1971 she was sole lead vocalist alongside Tony Bolton on drums, Rod Coe on bass guitar, David Fookes on keyboards, and Murray Partridge on lead guitar and backing vocals. In November 1971 the band's final single, "I Ain't Got the Time", was issued – featuring MacCallum's first released appearance – which reached the top 20 in the local charts and peaked at No. 30 on the Kent Music Report Singles Chart. After the demise of Freshwater in that month, she briefly joined Ray Brown's band, One Ton Gypsy, before going solo in early 1972.

== Solo career ==
In March 1972 Alison MacCallum issued her first solo single, "Superman", on RCA Records which was written by Harry Vanda and George Young (both ex-The Easybeats). It reached No. 12 on Go-Set's National Top 40 and No. 8 on the Kent Music Report. The B-side was a Ted Mulry (a.k.a. Martin Mulry) composition "Take Me Back". Also that month she released her debut solo album, Fresh Water, a reference to her former band. It was produced by United Kingdom producer Simon Napier-Bell, who had worked with The Yardbirds and T.Rex. John Tait described Napier-Bell's work as re-invigorating Vanda & Young's songwriting career "Ted Albert assigned him the task of finding artists to record some of the songs Harry and George were sending over from London. The most notable of these demos was a rock tune called 'Superman' ... [he] matched the song up with the soaring voice of session singer Alison MacCallum, added some brass to the original arrangement and suddenly they had a hit on their hands". Australian musicologist, Ian McFarlane, noted Fresh Water's "mix of rock, jazz and blues material proved to be a fine showcase for her expressive voice". In March 1974 it was re-released as, Any Way You Want Me.

In August 1972 MacCallum provided lead vocals for "It's Time", which was written and produced by Pat Aulton. The concept and words were by Paul Jones the Creative Director of the campaign. It was used as the theme on Australian Labor Party's TV and radio ads during Gough Whitlam's 1972 federal election campaign, making MacCallum a famous name through saturation radio and TV airplay, despite the single failing to chart. According to James Cockington "even though Labor was not credited on the label nor mentioned in the lyrics, most radio stations were reluctant to play the song, sensing its party-political roots". MacCallum was joined in the TV ads with a variety of celebrities including Bert Newton, Col Joye, Judy Stone, John Dease, Hazel Phillips, Ted Hamilton, Bellbird cast members, and Bobby Limb. Some of the celebrities suffered a negative backlash from appearing in the ads, Stone recalled "we didn't get paid for it, but we certainly lost a lot of work over it ... Some of us were black banned from clubs, and I had garbage thrown all over my lawn. And I wasn't the only one singled out".

MacCallum released three more singles on RCA: "Ol' Rock'n' Roll Boogie Woogie Blues" (July 1972), "Would You Believe?", and a cover of Rotary Connection's 1968 single, "Teach Me How to Fly" (1973), previously an Australian hit for local artist, Jeff St John and Copperwine in 1970. In 1973 MacCallum travelled to Europe to perform, and she showcased "Superman" at the eighth Midem International Music Trade Fair in Cannes. She returned to Australia and in October 1974 signed to Albert Productions. MacCallum collaborated with two fellow singers, Bobbi Marchini (ex-Freshwater) and Janice Slater as the Hooter Sisters, to release a cover of the Phil Spector-written single, "To Know Him Is to Love Him", originally performed by his band, The Teddy Bears.

In October 1974 MacCallum released her next solo single, "Excuse Me", which peaked at No. 29 on the Kent Music Report Singles Chart and spent 41 weeks in the top 100. It was followed by her second solo album, Alison a.k.a. Excuse Me, in July 1975 which spent two weeks on the Kent Music Report Top 100 Albums Chart. It provided two more singles, "Her Kind of Guy (Hot Burrito)" (September 1975) and "Love Grows Cold" (February 1976). During the late 1970s she appeared on the satirical comedy, The Naked Vicar Show, both on radio (Series 2 Episodes 1 and 2, November 1976) and on TV (Series 1 Episodes 1 and 9, May and September 1977).

== Post solo career ==
In the late 1970s Alison MacCallum concentrated on session work, providing backing vocals on John Robinson's Pity for the Victim and for other artists: Billy Thorpe, Doug Parkinson and Mark Holden. In 1979 her 1972 single, "Superman", was re-released by RCA together with a compilation album of the same name to cash in on the then-popular 1978 Superman movie.

According to McFarlane, MacCallum had "disappeared from public view", and that she was "a soul/blues stylist of considerable flair and passion". After the advent of CDs, only two of her solo tracks, "Superman" and "Excuse Me", were released on various artists' CDs, until September 2014 when Sony Music Australia issued a 2× CD compilation album, The Essential Alison MacCallum. It was compiled and annotated by Glenn A. Baker.

== Discography ==
=== Albums ===
List of albums, with selected chart positions.
Title	Album details	Peak chart positions
Title	Album details	AUS KMR
Fresh Water	Released: March 1972; Label: RCA Victor (SL-102036); Formats: LP; Note: Re-released in March 1974 as Any Way You Want Me, RCA Camden (VCL1-0009)	42
Excuse Me	Released: July 1975; Label: Albert Productions (APLP-010); Formats: LP; Note: a.k.a. Alison	96
Superman: The Best of the RCA Years	Released: April 1979; Label: RCA (VPL1-0211); Formats: LP; Note: Compilation album	—
The Essential Alison MacCallum	Released: 29 September 2014; Label: Sony Music Australia (88875004502); Formats: 2× CD; Note: Compilation album	—
"—" denotes a recording that did not chart or was not released in that territory.

=== Singles ===
List of singles, with selected chart positions, showing year released and album name.
Title	Year	Peak chart positions		Album
Title	Year	AUS KMR	AUS Go-Set	Album
"Superman" / "Take Me Back"	1972	8	12	Fresh Water
"Ol' Rock 'n' Roll Boogie Woogie Blues"	1972	87	—	Non-album singles
"It's Time"	1972	—	—	Non-album singles
"Would You Believe"	1972	—	—	Non-album singles
"Fire"	1973	—	—	Non-album singles
"Excuse Me"	1974	29	—	Excuse Me
"Her Kind of Guy (Hot Burrito)"	1975	—	—	Excuse Me
"Love Grows Cold"	1976	—	—	Excuse Me
"Superman"	1979	—	—	Superman: The Best of the RCA Years
"—" denotes a recording that did not chart or was not released in that territory.

=== Other appearances ===
- 1979 – Albert Archives – The Best Kept Secrets of Albert Productions 1965–76 – "To Love Somebody" (Albert Productions, credited as Alison McCallum & Tully)
- 1999 – Live, Loud and Sweaty: Australia's Live Music Scene of the Seventies – "Together Till the End of Time" (Canetoad, credited to Freshwater)

== Awards and nominations ==
=== Go-Set Pop Poll ===
The Go-Set Pop Poll was coordinated by teen-oriented pop music newspaper, Go-Set and was established in February 1966 and conducted an annual poll during 1966 to 1972 of its readers to determine the most popular personalities.

Year	Nominee / work	Award	Result
1972	herself	Female Artist	4th
