= Alyson Zalta =

American clinical psychologist

Alyson K. Zalta is a clinical psychologist who specializes in treatments for traumatic stress for vulnerable groups, such as youth experiencing homelessness and veterans. Her research aims to lessen the effects of trauma by raising awareness of what drives or prevents trauma and creating interventions to those experiencing it. She is an associate professor of Psychology and the lead investigator of the Trauma and Resilience Lab at the University of California, Irvine. Alyson Zalta is also on the editorial board of the journal Depression and Anxiety.

== Education ==
Zalta received her Bachelors of arts degree from Harvard University. She later attended University of Pennsylvania in 2012, to obtain her Doctorate of Philosophy (PhD) in Clinical Psychology under the supervision of Dianne Chambless. Her dissertation entitled Understanding the Nature of Perceived Control and Its Relationship with Anxiety. The study focuses on how a person's perception of their ability to control situations impacts their anxiety levels. Findings from this research could suggest that interventions aimed at enhancing a person's sense of control could be beneficial in managing anxiety disorders. She then completed her Clinical Internship at VA Palo Alto Healthcare System and her Postdoctoral Fellowship at Rush University Medical Center.

== Career ==
After graduating from University of Pennsylvania, Zalta began working as an assistant professor and lead investigator at the Trauma and Resilience Lab, University of California, Irvine. Where she continues to do her work regarding trauma and resilience. Her work mainly focuses on understanding the risk and resilience factors that contributes to the development of traumatic stress. As well she explores new and developing interventions for individuals who have been affected by trauma. In her current research program, she has incorporated fear conditioning paradigms using psychophysiology to assess whether fear learning processes may help to explain the intergenerational transmission of trauma and whether a resiliency intervention can improve extinction learning in those with a history of childhood interpersonal trauma. As well Zalta believes that memory and learning processes are also integral to the successful uptake of psychotherapy.

=== Media outreach ===
Zalta, UCI Affiliations: Faculty, Interdisciplinary Institute for Salivary Bioscience Research. and a Fellow, Center for the Neurobiology of Learning and Memory.

== Public outreach and advocacy ==
Zalta has been active in public education initiatives related to trauma awareness and mental health. She has participated in community discussions and academic panels addressing the stigma surrounding post-traumatic stress disorder (PTSD) and has emphasized the importance of accessible, evidence-based care for trauma survivors. Through her roles at the University of California Irvine and the Road Home Program, she has contributed to efforts aimed at improving public understanding of trauma recovery and resilience-building strategies.

== Awards and accolades ==
In 2019, Award for Outstanding Contribution to Trauma Psychology by an Early Career Psychologist presented by American Psychological Association. As stated by the American Psychological Association Zalta "research program addresses ways to alleviate the mental health burden of trauma through enhancing resilience factors."

She has received several awards in recognition of her contributions. In 2019, she was honored with the Award for Outstanding Contribution to Trauma Psychology by an Early Career Psychologist from the American Psychological Association. In 2020, she received the Faculty Mentorship Award from UCI's School of Social Ecology for her guidance and support to students.

In 2020, Faculty Mentorship Award, School of Social Ecology's Honors Program by University of California, Irvine. Amy Dent, director of the school's Honors Program, wrote: "Your invested, responsive, flexible, and skillful mentoring was remarkable to observe as the program's director and I'm sure for Emma Lea Dorn and Kristin Guzman to experience. Both students produced impressive thesis projects, which your guidance and feedback uniquely enabled them to accomplish. ... Your mentoring will undoubtedly have an indelible impact on their 'brilliant futures."

== Research ==
In 2014, Zalta experimented using CBT to Probe Psychobiobehavioral Resilience to Post-trauma Psychopathology. Zalta was awarded a grant by the National Institutes of Health of $153,808 for her research. She worked on establishing risk and resilience processes associated with mental illness following trauma and developing preventive interventions that target these mechanisms.

Zalta continues to make an influence through her work which has been cited over five thousand times. Her work has been published in leading scientific journals such as The British Journal of Psychiatry.

In 2019, She experimented with morning bright light therapy to improve sleep and relieve post-traumatic stress disorder symptoms. Zalta was given a grant by the National Institutes of Health of $1.5 million for research. She is testing wearable light emitting devices outfitted with LEDs at a specific light wavelength to match peak circadian photoreceptors in the eye. The studies are in their pilot stages but are showing promising results. Zalta examines how morning bright light therapy affects amygdala reactivity in individuals with traumatic stress.
