= Pablo (footballer, born 2006) =

Brazilian footballer (born 2006)

Personal information
- Full name: Pablo Pereira da Costa
- Date of birth: 1 July 2006 (age 20)
- Place of birth: Diadema, Brazil
- Height: 1.77 m (5 ft 10 in)
- Position: Left-back

Team information
- Current team: Internacional
- Number: 42

Youth career
- Vasco da Gama
- 2024: Cruzeiro
- 2024–: Internacional

Senior career*
Years	Team	Apps	(Gls)
2025–	Internacional	3	(0)
- * Club domestic league appearances and goals as of 03:59, 20 November 2025 (UTC)

Pablo Pereira da Costa (born 1 July 2006), simply known as Pablo, is a Brazilian professional footballer who plays as a left-back for Internacional.

== Career ==
Born in Diadema, São Paulo, Pablo joined Internacional's youth categories in 2024, after representing Cruzeiro and Vasco da Gama. He made his senior debut with the former's first team on 22 January 2025, coming on as a half-time substitute for injured Bruno Gomes in a 2–2 Campeonato Gaúcho away draw against Guarany de Bagé.

Pablo made his Série A debut on 25 October 2025; with Alexandro Bernabei and Alisson suspended, he replaced Gabriel Mercado in a 1–0 away loss to Fluminense.

== Career statistics ==
As of 20 November 2025

Appearances and goals by club, season and competition
Club	Season	League			State League		National Cup		Continental		Other		Total	
Club	Season	Division	Apps	Goals	Apps	Goals	Apps	Goals	Apps	Goals	Apps	Goals	Apps	Goals
Internacional	2024	Série A	0	0	0	0	0	0	—		8 (Note: Appearance(s) in Copa FGF)	0	8	0
Internacional	2025	Série A	1	0	2	0	0	0	0	0	3	0	6	0
Career total			1	0	2	0	0	0	0	0	11	0	14	0
