= Permanent Me =

- Origin: Bellmore, New York, United States
- Genres: Pop punk, Indie rock, Emo
- Years active: 2001–2008
- Past members: Brian James; Joseph Guccione; Adam Aviles; Chris Leonard; Arthur Fleischmann; Mike Fleischmann; Justin Morrell; Jon Bulzomi; Dan McCabe

Permanent Me was an American pop punk band from Bellmore, New York.

== History ==
Permanent Me first formed while its members were in high school, first as "The Madison Chase", then "Crown Victorian", and then "Yes, Virginia". The group benefited from online promotion on sites such as MySpace, and after catching the ear of Sum 41 lead singer Deryck Whibley and producer Matt Squire, Yes, Virginia signed to independent label I Surrender Records. The group changed its name to Permanent Me after legal issues with a band with the same name. They recorded their first EP, Dear Virginia, which came out in May 2006. Later in 2006 the group signed to Island Def Jam and released their first full-length album, After the Room Clears, early in 2007. After the release of their CD, bassist Justin Morrell and was replaced with Mike's cousin Arthur. In November 2007 Mike and Arthur left the band. In January 2008 Permanent Me released a new demo on their Myspace, and were writing a new record. Permanent Me decided in March 2008 to disband.

Mike is now drumming for Nightmare of You.

Arthur now plays bass for SKYES, Ryan Star, The Hate My Day Jobs, The The The Thunder and other artists in the NYC area.

== Members ==
Former members

- Brian James - vocals, guitar
- Joseph Guccione - guitar, vocals (Permanent Me); drums, bass (The Madison Chase)
- Adam Aviles - guitar (The Madison Chase)
- Jon Bulzomi - bass (The Madison Chase/Crown Victorian/Yes, Virginia)
- Chris Leonard - guitar (The Madison Chase/Crown Victorian)
- Arthur Fleischmann - bass ( SKYES / Permanent Me / The Hate My Day Jobs / The The The Thunder / Ryan Star)
- Mike Fleischmann - drums (The Madison Chase/Crown Victorian/Yes, Virginia/Permanent Me)
- Justin Morrell - bass (Permanent Me)
- Dan McCabe - guitar (Yes, Virginia)
- Geovanni Corona - guitar (Permanent Me)

== Discography ==
- Dear Virginia EP (I Surrender Records, 2006)
- After the Room Clears (Island Def Jam, 2007) US Billboard Heatseekers No. 44
