= Alison (album) =

Studio album by Alison MacCallum
- Released: October 1975
- Genre: Pop/Soul
- Label: Albert Productions
- Producer: Simon Napier-Bell

Alison MacCallum chronology
Any Way You Want Me (1974)	Alison (1975)	Superman (1979)

Alison aka Excuse Me, is the second album by Australian pop, soul, rock and blues singer Alison MacCallum, released in 1975.

== Track listing ==
1. "Hot Burrito" (Gram Parsons) – 3:49
2. "Fade In, Fade Out" (Simon Napier-Bell) – 2:50
3. "Hear My Voice On the Radio" (Sidney Jordan) – 3:09
4. "Cry For Me" (Harry Vanda/George Young) – 4:08
5. "See What You Can Do" (Simon Napier-Bell) – 2:42
6. "Like a Child" (Simon Napier-Bell/Antonio Morales/Larry Ashmore) – 3:41
7. "If Your Eyes Could Smile" (Simon Napier-Bell/A.Ryanto) – 4:01
8. "Things To Do" (Harry Vanda/George Young)) – 3:07
9. "Then" (Simon Napier-Bell/Antonio Morales) – 3:09
10. "Excuse Me" (Simon Napier-Bell/Antonio Morales) – 3:09

== Known personnel ==
- Alison MacCallum: Vocals, Backing Vocals
- Bobbi Marchini: Backing Vocals
- Janice Slater: Backing Vocals
