= João Victor (footballer, born July 2007) =

Brazilian footballer

Personal information
- Full name: João Victor Alves de Morais Francisco
- Date of birth: 27 July 2007 (age 19)
- Place of birth: Rio de Janeiro, Brazil
- Height: 1.78 m (5 ft 10 in)
- Position: Winger

Team information
- Current team: Internacional
- Number: 44

Youth career
- 2023–2024: Vasco da Gama
- 2024–2026: Internacional

Senior career*
| Years | Team | Apps | (Gls) |
| 2026– | Internacional | 8 | (1) |
- * Club domestic league appearances and goals as of 22:42, 20 September 2026 (UTC)

João Victor Alves de Morais Francisco (born 27 July 2007), known as João Victor, is a Brazilian professional footballer who plays as a winger for Internacional.

== Career ==
Born in the Governador Island, Rio de Janeiro, João Victor joined the youth categories of hometown club Internacional in July 2024, and signed his first professional contract in October of that year. He previously played for Vasco da Gama, but was rarely used in their youth sides.

João Victor made his first team debut on 11 January 2026, coming on as a half-time substitute for Raykkonen in a 2–1 Campeonato Gaúcho away win over Novo Hamburgo. He scored his first goal four days later, netting the opener in a 4–0 away routing of Monsoon; it was also his first senior start.

On 16 July 2026, João Victor and his brother both renewed their contracts with Inter, until 2029 and 2030, respectively.

== Personal life ==
João Victor's older brother Luiz Felipe is also a footballer. A left-back, he too plays for Inter.

== Career statistics ==
As of 26 February 2026

Appearances and goals by club, season and competition
| Club | Season | League | | | State League | | National Cup | | Continental | | Other | | Total | |
| Club | Season | Division | Apps | Goals | Apps | Goals | Apps | Goals | Apps | Goals | Apps | Goals | Apps | Goals |
|---|---|---|---|---|---|---|---|---|---|---|---|---|---|---|
| Internacional | 2026 | Série A | 1 | 0 | 7 | 1 | 0 | 0 | — | | — | | 8 | 1 |
| Career total | | | 1 | 0 | 7 | 1 | 0 | 0 | 0 | 0 | 0 | 0 | 8 | 1 |

== Honours ==
Internacional

- Recopa Gaúcha: 2026
