= Allison Creek =

Stream in South Dakota, U.S.

Coordinates: 45°38′26″N 103°11′10″W

Allison Creek is a stream in the U.S. state of South Dakota.

Allison Creek has the name of Curt Allison, a pioneer rancher.

== See also ==
- List of rivers of South Dakota
