= Alisson (disambiguation) =

Alisson Becker (born 1992) is a Brazilian football goalkeeper.

Alisson may also refer to:

- Alisson (footballer, born 1993), Alisson Euler de Freitas Castro, Brazilian football attacking midfielder
- Alisson (footballer, born 1995), Alisson Machado dos Santos, Brazilian football goalkeeper
- Alisson (footballer, born 1999), Alisson dos Santos Correa, Brazilian football defensive midfielder
- Alisson (footballer, born 2008), Alisson Rodrigues de Melo, Brazilian football left-back
- Alisson Abarca (born 1996), Salvadoran model
- Alisson Farias (born 1996), Brazilian football striker
- Alisson Perticheto (born 1997), Swiss-Filipino figure skater

== See also ==
- Alison (disambiguation)
- Allison (disambiguation)
- Allisson (disambiguation)
