= Alysson (footballer, born 1978) =

Brazilian footballer

Personal information
- Full name: Alysson Ramos da Silva
- Date of birth: 6 March 1978 (age 48)
- Place of birth: Serrinha, Brazil
- Height: 1.71 m (5 ft 7 in)
- Position: Left back

Youth career
- 1998–1999: Fluminense-BA

Senior career*
Years	Team	Apps	(Gls)
1999	Fluminense-BA		
2000	Unibol		
2001	São Bento		
2002	Botafogo-PB		
2003	Nacional-PB		
2004	Treze		
2004	Caldense		
2005	Ipatinga		
2005–2007	Vera Cruz		
2006–2007	→ Vitória (loan)		
2007–2008	→ ABC (loan)		
2009–2010	Atlético Goianiense	14	(1)
2010	Vila Nova	3	(0)
2010	Aparecidense		
2010	Santa Cruz	2	(2)
2011	Anapolina	16	(4)
2011	Campinense	6	(0)
2012	Aparecidense	5	(0)
2012	Fluminense de Feira	5	(0)
2013	Jacuipense	2	(0)
2013	Nacional de Patos		
2014	Botafogo-BA	6	(1)
- * Club domestic league appearances and goals

Alysson Ramos da Silva or simply Alysson (born 6 March 1978), is a Brazilian former football left back.

== Career ==
Alysson has played in Campeonato Brasileiro Série B with Atlético Clube Goianiense and Vila Nova Futebol Clube.

== Honours ==
- Minas Gerais State League: 2005
- Bahia State League: 2007
