= Allex (footballer) =

Brazilian footballer (born 2006)

Personal information
- Full name: Allex Rodrigues Pereira da Silva
- Date of birth: 4 May 2006 (age 20)
- Place of birth: São Paulo, Brazil
- Height: 1.67 m (5 ft 6 in)
- Position: Midfielder

Team information
- Current team: Internacional
- Number: 31

Youth career
- 2016–2025: Internacional

Senior career*
Years	Team	Apps	(Gls)
2026–	Internacional	10	(1)
- * Club domestic league appearances and goals as of 15:09, 26 February 2026 (UTC)

Allex Rodrigues Pereira da Silva (born 4 May 2006), simply known as Allex, is a Brazilian professional footballer who plays as a midfielder for Internacional.

== Career ==
Born in São Paulo, Allex joined the youth categories of hometown club Internacional in 2016, from a school in his hometown named R Soccer. In 2025, he began training with the first team under head coach Roger Machado.

Allex made his first team debut on 11 January 2026, starting in a 2–1 Campeonato Gaúcho away win over Novo Hamburgo. He scored his first goal four days later, netting his side's fourth in a 4–0 away routing of Monsoon.

== Career statistics ==
As of 26 February 2026

Appearances and goals by club, season and competition
Club	Season	League			State League		National Cup		Continental		Other		Total	
Club	Season	Division	Apps	Goals	Apps	Goals	Apps	Goals	Apps	Goals	Apps	Goals	Apps	Goals
Internacional	2026	Série A	1	0	9	1	0	0	—		—		10	1
Career total			1	0	9	1	0	0	0	0	0	0	10	1

== Honours ==
Internacional

- Recopa Gaúcha: 2026
