= Allisson =

Allisson is a variant form of the given name Alison. Notable people with the name include:

- Allisson Lozz (born 1992), Mexican actress, model, and singer
- Allisson Ricardo (born 1988), Brazilian footballer

== See also ==
- Alisson (disambiguation)
- Allison (disambiguation)
