= Luiz Felipe (footballer, born 2006) =

Brazilian footballer (born 2006)

Personal information
- Full name: Luiz Felipe de Morais Francisco
- Date of birth: 19 May 2006 (age 20)
- Place of birth: Rio de Janeiro, Brazil
- Height: 1.84 m (6 ft 0 in)
- Position: Left-back

Team information
- Current team: Internacional
- Number: 53

Youth career
- Corinthians
- 2023–2024: Athletico Paranaense
- 2024: Londrina
- 2025: Linense
- 2025–: Internacional

Senior career*
Years	Team	Apps	(Gls)
2026–	Internacional	1	(0)
- * Club domestic league appearances and goals as of 22:25, 17 May 2026 (UTC)

Luiz Felipe de Morais Francisco (born 19 May 2006), known as Luiz Felipe, is a Brazilian professional footballer who plays as a left-back for Internacional.

== Career ==
Born in the Governador Island, Rio de Janeiro, Luiz Felipe played for the youth sides of Corinthians, Athletico Paranaense, Londrina and Linense before joining Internacional in February 2025. He made his senior debut on 7 May 2026, starting in a 2–1 win over Brasil de Pelotas, for the year's Recopa Gaúcha.

Luiz Felipe made his Série A debut on 16 May 2026, coming on as a late substitute for Matheus Bahia in a 4–1 home routing of Vasco da Gama.

== Personal life ==
Luiz Felipe's younger brother João Victor is also a footballer. A forward, he too plays for Inter.

== Career statistics ==
As of 17 May 2026

Appearances and goals by club, season and competition
Club	Season	League			State League		National Cup		Continental		Other		Total	
Club	Season	Division	Apps	Goals	Apps	Goals	Apps	Goals	Apps	Goals	Apps	Goals	Apps	Goals
Internacional	2025	Série A	0	0	—		—		—		5 (Note: Appearance(s) in Copa FGF)	0	5	0
Internacional	2026	Série A	1	0	0	0	0	0	—		1 (Note: Appearance(s) in Recopa Gaúcha)	0	2	0
Career total			1	0	0	0	0	0	0	0	6	0	7	0
