= Dianne Chambless =

American clinical psychologist (1948–2023)

- Born: February 26, 1948; Montgomery, Alabama, U.S.
- Died: July 14, 2023 (aged 75)

Academic background
- Education: BA, political science, 1969, Tulane University; MA, Clinical Psychology, 1972; PhD, Clinical Psychology, 1979 Temple University
- Thesis: The role of anxiety in flooding with agoraphobic clients (1979)

Dianne Lynn Chambless (February 26, 1948 – July 14, 2023) was an American clinical psychologist.

== Early life and education ==
Dianne Lynn Chambless was born in Montgomery, Alabama, on February 26, 1948. She earned her Bachelor of Arts degree in political science from Tulane University and her PhD in Clinical Psychology from Temple University. While earning her PhD, she joined the Feminist Therapy Collective, Inc. in Philadelphia, Pennsylvania part-time until 1976.

== Career ==
Upon earning her PhD, Chambless became an assistant professor at the University of Georgia from 1979 to 1982. She accepted a one-year visiting professorship at Temple University School of Medicine before earning a permanent position at American University. While at the university, she was appointed to Chair of the American Psychological Association (APA) Promotion and Dissemination of Psychological Procedures task force. In this role, she helped to develop criteria for empirically evaluating psychological treatments and make recommendations. She left American University to become the William Leon Wylie Professor of Psychology at the University of North Carolina at Chapel Hill (UNC). While at UNC, she became the co-director of their Anxiety Treatment Center and published Empirically supported psychological interventions: Controversies and evidence.

In 2001, Chambless left UNC to accept a full professor position at the University of Pennsylvania. While there, she published numerous articles of anxiety disorders such as Cognitive–behavioral therapy for adult anxiety disorders in clinical practice: A meta-analysis of effectiveness studies and Adjunctive couple and family intervention for patients with anxiety disorders. In 2010, she received the Aaron T. Beck Award for Sustained and Enduring Contributions to Cognitive Therapy and later the Klaus-Grawe-Award for the Advancement of Innovative Research in Clinical Psychology and Psychotherapy. A few years later, she was the recipient of the 2017 Lifetime Achievement Award from the Association for Behavioral & Cognitive Therapies.

== Death ==
Chambless died of lung cancer on July 14, 2023, at the age of 75.
