= Allison (footballer, born 1986) =

Brazilian footballer

Personal information
- Full name: Allison Patrício
- Date of birth: 31 January 1986 (age 40)
- Height: 1.89 m (6 ft 2 1/2 in)
- Position: Forward

Team information
- Current team: Mafra
- Number: 23

Senior career*
Years	Team	Apps	(Gls)
2006	Criciúma		
2008–2009	Olivais e Moscavide	25	(1)
2009–2011	Mafra	37	(4)
2011–2012	Al-Mesaimeer		
2012–	Mafra	183	(32)
- * Club domestic league appearances and goals as of 1 July 2018

Allison Patrício, known as Allison (born 31 January 1986) is a Brazilian football player who plays for Mafra.

== Club career ==
He made his professional debut in the Segunda Liga for Mafra on 8 August 2015 in a game against Gil Vicente.
