= Allison Deforest Pickett =

Canadian entomologist

Allison Deforest Pickett (1900 – 18 September 1991) was a Canadian entomologist who worked at the Dominion Entomological Laboratory, Annapolis Royal. He was a proponent of biological control and pioneered the careful use of targeted insecticide use in the management of horticultural pests at a time when broad-spectrum insecticides like DDT were rising.

Pickett was born in a farming family in the Lower Kars, New Brunswick. He worked as a ranch hand before joining the Nova Scotia Agricultural College. He obtained a degree from the Ontario Agricultural College with studies at the Macdonald College. He received a BS degree from McGill University with entomology honours in 1929. He worked at the Dominion Entomological Laboratory from 1927 and became an Agricultural Representative for Kings County, Nova Scotia in 1928, and still later a Provincial Entomologist. He taught at the Nova Scotia Agricultural College and began to work on his master's degree, studying apple maggots and their control and received it in 1936 from McGill University. He became in-charge of the Dominion Entomological Laboratory in 1939. In his early years he was known to use ideas from his colleagues without acknowledgement but this was common in his time and he thought he had the right as the head of the laboratory. He received an honorary DSc in 1959 from McGill and an honorary LLD in 1989 from the Dalhousie University, Halifax. He promoted a system of integrated pest management with minimal use of target-specific chemical pesticides at a time when DDT usage was at its peak.
