= Braian Aguirre =

Argentine footballer

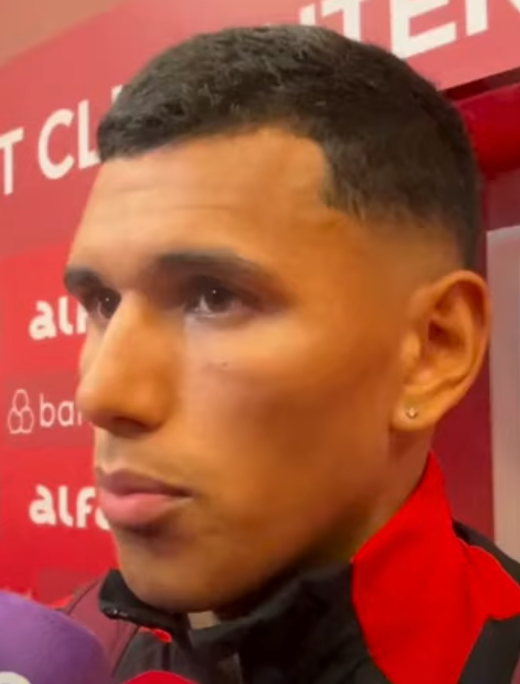

Personal information
- Full name: Braian Nahuel Aguirre
- Date of birth: 28 July 2000 (age 26)
- Place of birth: Rafael Calzada, Argentina
- Height: 1.75 m (5 ft 9 in)
- Position: Right-back

Team information
- Current team: Internacional
- Number: 35

Youth career
- Lanús

Senior career*
Years	Team	Apps	(Gls)
2020–2024	Lanús	115	(4)
2024–	Internacional	59	(3)
- * Club domestic league appearances and goals as of 8 April 2026

Braian Nahuel Aguirre (born 28 July 2000) is an Argentine footballer who plays as a right-back and left-back. He currently plays for Internacional.

== Career ==
Aguirre came through the youth ranks of Lanús. His first-team breakthrough arrived in October 2020, with the defender making his senior debut in a Copa Sudamericana second stage, first leg home win over São Paulo on 28 October; he was substituted off for Franco Orozco early in the second half, as he was again days later in the Copa de la Liga Profesional against Boca Juniors on 31 October. He scored his first senior goal on 4 November, netting in the Sudamericana second leg against São Paulo as his club progressed on away goals following a 6–6 aggregate draw.

On 2 September 2024, Aguirre signed a contract with Internacional in Brazil until December 2027.

== Career statistics ==
As of 5 November 2020.

Appearances and goals by club, season and competition
Club:	Season:	League:			Cup		League Cup		Continental		Other		Total	
Club:	Season:	Division:	Apps:	Goals:	Apps	Goals	Apps	Goals	Apps	Goals	Apps	Goals	Apps	Goals
Lanús	2020–21 (Note: Soccerway counts Copa de la Liga Profesional appearances as league appearances.)	Primera División	1	0	0	0	0	0	2 (Note: Appearance(s) in the Copa Sudamericana)	1	0	0	3	1
Career total			1	0	0	0	0	0	2	1	0	0	3	1

== Honours ==
Internacional

- Campeonato Gaúcho: 2025
- Recopa Gaúcha: 2026
