= Allyson Clay =

Canadian artist

- Born: 1953 (age 72–73); Vancouver, British Columbia, Canada
- Website: http://www.allysonclay.com

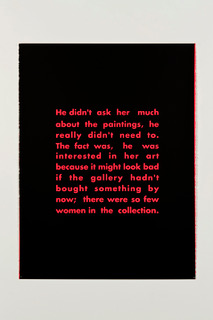
Allyson Clay, Untitled (He didn't ask her much...), 1990, screenprint on paper, collection of the Morris and Helen Belkin Art Gallery.

Allyson Clay (born 1953) is a Canadian visual artist, curator, and educator based in Vancouver, BC.

== Life ==
Clay was born in Vancouver, British Columbia in 1953, and spent much of her childhood and adolescence in Italy. She obtained a BFA in Painting from the Nova Scotia College of Art and Design in 1980, and an MFA from the University of British Columbia in 1985. She was a professor at the School of the Contemporary Arts at Simon Fraser University.

== Artistic practice ==
Clay has an interdisciplinary artistic practice that encompasses photography, painting, and installation. Her artwork has often examined "the problematic, contradictory nature of contemporary urbanism" through "experiments with conceptual theory and traditional colour." Clay's artistic research draws upon work by feminist writer and scholar Donna Haraway, and American artist Mary Kelly. Clay looks at the role of "women through the city, through the social, and through the history of art making."

Her artwork has been exhibited at Canadian galleries including the Vancouver Art Gallery and the Banff Centre for the Arts. Clay is represented by Costin & Klintworth Gallery in Toronto. Clay's work is in several public collections including the Morris and Helen Belkin Art Gallery, the Museum of Contemporary Canadian Art, and the University of Lethbridge Art Gallery.

=== Selected exhibitions ===
- 2018 Beginning with the Seventies: GLUT, Jan 12 - April 9, Morris and Helen Belkin Art Gallery, Vancouver, BC.
- 2009 Mall/Flip, Jan 17 – Feb 18, Leo Kamen Gallery, Toronto, ON.
- 2004 The shadow of production, Vancouver Art Gallery, Vancouver, BC.
- 2002 Imaginary Standard Distance, Walter Phillips Gallery, Banff, AB.
- 1995 Allyson Clay and Shonagh Alexander, Contemporary Art Gallery, Vancouver, BC.
- 1992 Traces of a City in the Spaces Between Some People, Charles H. Scott Gallery, Vancouver, BC.
- 1988 LURE, Artspeak Gallery, Vancouver, BC.
- 1985 Hold It, Western Front Gallery, Vancouver, BC.

=== Grants ===
Clay has received grants from the Canadian Council for the Arts, the BC Arts Council, and the Rockefeller Foundation Bellagio Residency Program.
