= Alysson (footballer, born 2002) =

Brazilian footballer

Personal information
- Full name: Alysson Cristian Oliveira Silva
- Date of birth: 26 September 2002 (age 24)
- Place of birth: Coronel Fabriciano, Brazil
- Height: 1.83 m (6 ft 0 in)
- Position: Centre-back

Team information
- Current team: Leixões (on loan from Santa Clara)
- Number: 14

Youth career
- 2009–2022: Cruzeiro
- 2022–2023: Botafogo
- 2023: Betim

Senior career*
Years	Team	Apps	(Gls)
2023	Alverca B	5	(1)
2023–2024	Alverca	16	(1)
2024–	Santa Clara	2	(0)
2024–2025	→ Alverca (loan)	24	(1)
2025–2026	→ Farense (loan)	13	(0)
2026–	→ Leixões (loan)	0	(0)

International career^{‡}
2017–2018	Brazil U17	3	(1)
- * Club domestic league appearances and goals as of 11 September 2026 ‡ National team caps and goals as of 17:52, 12 August 2024 (UTC)

Alysson Cristian Oliveira Silva (born 26 September 2002) is a Brazilian professional footballer who plays as a centre-back for Liga Portugal 2 club Leixões on loan from Santa Clara.

== Club career ==
Alysson joined the youth academy of Cruzeiro at the age of 12 and worked his way up their youth categories. On 28 March 2019, he signed his first professional contract with the club. On 12 April 2022, he moved to the youth academy of Botafogo. In 2023, he briefly moved to the academy of Betim before joining the Portuguese club Alverca, and in his debut season helped them win the 2023–24 Liga 3. On 25 June 2024 he transferred to Santa Clara until 2026 as they were newly promoted to the Primeira Liga. He made his professional debut with Santa Clara in a 4–1 Primeira Liga win over Estoril on 11 August 2024.

On 17 July 2025, Alysson was sent on a season-long loan to Liga Portugal 2 club Farense.

== International career ==
Alysson is a youth international for Brazil, having played for the Brazil U17s in 2017.

== Career statistics ==
As of match played 16 August 2024

Appearances and goals by club, season, and competition
Club	Season	League			Cup		League Cup		Other		Total	
Club	Season	Division	Apps	Goals	Apps	Goals	Apps	Goals	Apps	Goals	Apps	Goals
Alverca B	2023–24	Campeonato de Portugal	5	1	—		—		—		5	1
Alverca	2023–24	Liga 3	16	1	0	0	0	0	—		16	1
Santa Clara	2024–25	Primeira Liga	2	0	0	0	0	0	—		2	0
Career total			23	2	0	0	0	0	0	0	23	2

== Honours ==
Alverca

- Liga 3: 2023–24
