= Allison Islands =

Island group in Antarctica

- Interactive map of Allison Islands

Geography
- Location: Antarctica
- Coordinates: 66°21′S 110°29′E
- Archipelago: Windmill Islands

Administration
- Administered under the Antarctic Treaty System

Demographics
- Population: Uninhabited

The Allison Islands are a small chain of Antarctic islands lying in the north side of the entrance to Sparkes Bay in the Windmill Islands. They were first mapped from air photos taken by USN Operation Highjump and Operation Windmill in 1947 and 1948. Named by the US-ACAN for William L. Allison, ionospheric scientist and member of the Wilkes Station party of 1958.

== See also ==
- Composite Antarctic Gazetteer
- List of Antarctic and sub-Antarctic islands
- List of Antarctic islands south of 60° S
- SCAR
- Territorial claims in Antarctica
