= Allison Harvey =

Australian psychologist and researcher

Allison G. Harvey
- Born: Allison G. Harvey; Australia
- Citizenship: Australian
- Education: Macquarie University; University of New South Wales
- Known for: Cognitive model of insomnia Transdiagnostic approaches to mental disorders Transdiagnostic Intervention for Sleep and Circadian Dysfunction
- Awards: Distinguished Scientist Award (Sleep Research Society); Peter Hauri Lifetime Distinguished Scientific Achievement Award
- Scientific career
- Workplaces: University of California, Berkeley

Allison G. Harvey is an Australian psychologist. She is a Distinguished Professor of Psychology and Director of the Golden Bear Sleep & Mood Research Clinic at the University of California, Berkeley. She is known for her research on the role of sleep and circadian processes in mental health, the development of transdiagnostic treatments, and the translation of basic science (memory, habit formation) into approaches that improve outcomes from evidence-based psychological treatments for mental health problems. Harvey has authored over 350 articles/chapters (h-index of 120) plus 3 books. Her work has been recognized by several prominent awards, including the Distinguished Scientist Award from the Sleep Research Society and the Peter Hauri Lifetime Distinguished Scientific Achievement Award from the Society for Behavioral Sleep Medicine.

== Early life and education ==
Harvey completed her clinical training at Macquarie University and her PhD at the University of New South Wales, both in Sydney, Australia. Her PhD mentor was Dr. Richard A. Bryant. She undertook postdoctoral work in the Department of Psychiatry at the University of Oxford, under the mentorship of David M. Clark, and subsequently held a faculty appointment in Oxford’s Department of Experimental Psychology; she was also a Fellow of St Anne’s College. Harvey moved to the University of California, Berkeley in 2004.

== Career ==
At UC Berkeley, Harvey directs the Golden Bear Sleep & Mood Research Clinic and leads a program of treatment-development and implementation research addressing sleep and circadian dysfunction in populations with mental health problems. Her team’s research spans transdiagnostic approaches, basic cognitive models of insomnia, randomized clinical trials of interventions, and large scale implementation projects in community mental health centers (CMHCs).

== Research ==
Harvey’s research program encompasses four interrelated themes: transdiagnostic approaches to mental disorders, treatment of sleep and circadian dysfunction across diagnostic categories, improving patient memory for psychological treatment, and incorporating habit-formation science into intervention design.

=== Cognitive model of insomnia ===
Harvey developed an influential cognitive model of chronic insomnia that emphasizes night-time and daytime cognitive processes (worry, rumination, selective attention, misperception) that maintain sleep problems even after the precipitating cause has resolved. This model informed cognitive therapy approaches for insomnia and shaped a body of experimental and treatment research in the field.

=== Transdiagnostic approaches ===
Harvey was among the early proponents of transdiagnostic frameworks in clinical psychology. In a book published by Oxford University Press, co-authored with Warren Mansell, Ed Watkins, and Roz Shafran, she argued that many psychological disorders are maintained by shared cognitive and behavioral processes such as rumination, worry, avoidance, and perfectionism. This work contributed to the development of transdiagnostic treatment models that target common maintaining mechanisms rather than disorder-specific symptoms.

=== Transdiagnostic Intervention for Sleep and Circadian Dysfunction ===
Harvey co-developed the Transdiagnostic Intervention for Sleep and Circadian Dysfunction (also known as TranS-C or TSC) with Daniel J. Buysse of the University of Pittsburgh. TSC is a modular intervention designed to address a range of sleep and circadian difficulties, including insomnia, circadian phase delay, hypersomnia, nightmares, and difficulties with continuous positive airway pressure adherence, within a single protocol. The intervention integrates principles from sleep and circadian science, cognitive behavioral therapy for insomnia, interpersonal and social rhythm therapy, chronotherapy, and motivational interviewing.

Harvey has led multiple randomized trials evaluating TSC. A trial in adolescents (N = 178) targeting eveningness chronotype demonstrated improvements in circadian preference, daytime sleepiness, and sleep regularity compared with psychoeducation. Long-term follow-up indicated limited persistence of effects, motivating subsequent refinements to the intervention.

A community mental health center trial (N = 121) found that TSC reduced sleep disturbance and psychiatric symptoms and improved selected functional outcomes among socioeconomically disadvantaged individuals with severe mental illness receiving routine care.

Harvey also led a large hybrid effectiveness–implementation study involving approximately 539 patients and 177 community providers, which evaluated standard and adapted versions of TSC across multiple community mental health centers.

=== Memory Support Intervention ===
Harvey led the development of the Memory Support Intervention (MSI), an adjunctive set of evidence-based strategies designed to enhance patients’ encoding, consolidation, and recall of therapeutic recommendations. Pilot studies demonstrated improved recall of treatment content, while subsequent randomized trials yielded mixed efficacy findings and informed refinements to the intervention approach.

=== Habit formation and HABITs ===
Drawing on learning theory and habit science, Harvey has argued for the systematic integration of habit-formation principles into evidence-based psychological treatments to enhance long-term maintenance of behavior change. Her team developed HABITs (Habit-Based Sleep Intervention), which incorporates reinforcement schedules and personalized text-message prompts to support habit consolidation and reduce relapse risk.

== Honors and awards ==
- Queens Trust Award for Young Australians (1997)
- Chaim and Bela Danieli Early Career Award, International Society for Traumatic Stress Studies (1998)
- Best New Researcher Award, Association for Behavioral and Cognitive Therapies (2002)
- Early Career Award, Australian Psychological Society (2003)
- Honorary doctorate, Örebro University (2011)
- Distinguished Scientist Award, Sleep Research Society (2021)
- Peter Hauri Lifetime Distinguished Scientific Achievement Award, Society for Behavioral Sleep Medicine (2022)

== Selected publications ==
- Harvey AG. A cognitive model of insomnia. Behaviour Research and Therapy. 2002.
- Harvey AG, Watkins E, Mansell W, Shafran R. Cognitive behavioural processes across psychological disorders. Oxford University Press; 2004.
- Harvey AG, Soehner AM, Kaplan KA, et al. Treating insomnia improves mood and functioning in bipolar disorder. Journal of Consulting and Clinical Psychology. 2015.
- Harvey AG, Dong L, Hein K, et al. A randomized controlled trial of TranS-C in a community setting. Journal of Consulting and Clinical Psychology. 2021.
- Harvey AG, Callaway CA, Zieve GG, Gumport NB, Armstrong CC. Applying the science of habit formation. Perspectives on Psychological Science. 2022.
- Harvey AG, Buysse DJ. Treating Sleep Problems: A Transdiagnostic Approach. Guilford Press; 2017.
