= After the Room Clears =

Studio album by Permanent Me
- Released: Jan 30, 2007
- Label: Stolen Transmission
- Producer: Matt Squire

Professional ratings
Review scores
Source	Rating
Allmusic	4.5/5 stars

After the Room Clears is an album by Permanent Me, released in 2007.

== Track listing ==
No.	Title	Length
1.	"Until You Leave"	3:20
2.	"Allison"	3:05
3.	"Heartattack"	3:43
4.	"4 A.M."	2:45
5.	"Christine"	2:22
6.	"Blackjaw Suitcase"	3:35
7.	"By The Time"	2:56
8.	"Later On"	3:00
9.	"Friday Night"	2:41
10.	"Dead To You"	3:03
11.	"New York City"	3:03
12.	"Twenty Years"	3:03

== Personnel ==
- Mike Fleischmann – drums
- Joseph Guccione – guitar, vocals
- Terese Joseph – A&R
- Brian James – guitar, vocals
- Sarah Lewitinn – A&R
- Louis Marino – artwork, layout design
- Meaghan Montagano – portrait photography
- Justin Morrell – bass
- Rey Roldan – publicity
- Matt Squire – producer, engineer, mixing, audio production, audio engineer
- Andy West – art direction, design
