= Allison, Williamson County, Texas =

Ghost town in Texas, US

Allison, also known as Old Friendship, is a ghost town in Williamson County, Texas, United States. It was established in 1847, by Elihu Cresswell Allison. A post office called Cone, operated there from 1878 to 1889, and one called Allison from 1892 to 1894. A school opened c. 1873, later being expanded by WoodmenLife and used as a meeting place for members. The school and other buildings were destroyed by a flood in 1921, causing most people and business to relocate to Friendship. The community was abandoned by the 1950s, and was flooded by Granger Lake in the 1980s.
