= The Allisons (American group) =

The Allisons were an American girl group who had a minor hit with the song "Surfer Street". This song was released on Tip Records and charted for one week in December 1963, in the number 93 position. The song capitalized on the popularity of early 1960s surfing culture.
