= Shutl =

UK business

- Industry: Delivery
- Founded: 2008
- Headquarters: United Kingdom
- Key people: Tom Allason (Note: Son of the MP and espionage writer, as 'Nigel West', Rupert Allason)
- Products: Transportation of goods
- Parent: eBay (2013-25 July 2019)
- Website: Shutl.com

Shutl is a subsidiary of eBay Inc. which provides delivery services. The company was founded in London in 2008 by Tom Allason, as a company offering a rapid fulfillment service by connecting online retailers with local same-day couriers. The company was bought by eBay in 2013.

== History ==
Shutl received £500,000 of venture capital investment in October 2009 from investors including Simon Murdoch, Paul Birch, Mark Zaleski, and Big Bang Ventures of Belgium. Murdoch, who was previously Vice President of Amazon in Europe, joined the company's board as non-executive chairman. Shutl's official launch took place on 9 December 2009 at LeWeb, a European Internet conference.

The company acted as an aggregator for same-day delivery services over short distances, connecting retailers with couriers who made deliveries within a ten-mile radius of the retailer's premises.

In the first months of operations, Shutl was available in London only. Its first delivery transaction took place in March 2010. The company's initial growth rate was about 50 percent month-on-month. Company executives planned for growth within the UK and then internationally. One of the first major retailers to adopt the service in London was Argos, the UK's largest multichannel retailer.

The United States Patent and Trademark Office granted Shutl a trademark in August 2011. By Christmas that year, Shutl extended its coverage to serve 50% of the UK's online shoppers. By mid-2012, Shutl operated in more than 50 UK cities and towns, serving 70% of UK shoppers.

In 2012, Shutl executives began planning for a North American launch. The company received a $2 million investment from the UPS Strategic Enterprise Fund and the French post office, La Poste, made a similar investment through its wholly owned subsidiary, Geopost. The launch took place in February 2013.

In 2012, Shutl offered Jamaican sprinter and Olympic champion Usain Bolt a one-percent stake in the company in exchange for his endorsement. The company won the 2012 DHL Online Fulfillment Initiative of the Year award, and Startups.co.uk ranked Shutl at number 1 in their top 100 startups of the year. In November 2012, the company won the National Business Awards Start-up Business of the Year award.

In January 2013, Shutl won Best Transport, Travel or Environmental Startup at The Europas.

In June 2019, eBay UK announced they would be changing their delivery service provider from Shutl to Packlink.

== Purchase by eBay ==
On 23 October 2013, it was announced by eBay that it had bought the firm and was aiming for one-hour delivery in the UK.

As of 2018, Shutl Limited continued to be registered in London, as a wholly owned subsidiary of eBay International AG.

eBay turned off integration with Shutl in July 2019.
