= Alison Barth =

American neuroscientist

Alison Barth is a fellow of the American Association for the Advancement of Science. and the Maxwell H. and Gloria C. Connan Professor of Life Sciences, Biological Sciences and Neuroscience Institute at Carnegie Mellon University.

== Early life and education ==
Alison Barth was born in the state of Maryland, but her family later moved to the states of Kansas, Wisconsin, and Ohio throughout her childhood. She received a Bachelor of Arts in biology from Brown University. She received her Ph.D. in Molecular and Cell Biology from the University of California, Berkeley (1997), and conducted her post-doctoral research in neurophysiology at Stanford University (2001).

== Research and career ==
During her time at Stanford University, Barth developed and filed a provisional patent for the “fosGFP” mouse, a transgenic mouse that labels green fluorescent protein (GFP) expression in vivo and visualizes neurons undergoing plasticity.

At Carnegie Mellon University, Barth's research focuses on understanding how the brain changes in response to experience, particularly in the context of learning and memory. She studies the somatosensory cortex of rodents, investigating how synapses are altered as animals undergo different types of experiences.

== Honors and awards ==
In 2012, she received the McKnight Foundation's Memory and Cognitive Disorders Award. In 2014, she received the Kaufman Grant to study neural communication in the cerebral cortex.

She was awarded the Society for Neuroscience's Research Award for Innovation in Neuroscience and the Career Development Award in 2008, and she received the Humboldt Foundation's Bessel Research Award in 2009.
