= Allison Amos Pettengill =

American politician

Allison Amos Pettengill (November 13, 1808 – January 17, 1882) was an American politician and newspaper editor.

Pettengill, son of the Rev. Amos Pettengill, was born in Champlain, New York, on November 13, 1808. In his early years, his father moved to Morris, Connecticut, and from that place the son entered Middlebury College, whence he came to Yale College at the close of the first year. He graduated from Yale in 1829.

For nine or ten years after graduation he was employed in teaching private select schools in Bridgeport, Connecticut, and neighboring towns. In 1839, while conducting a successful school in Bridgeport, he bought the newspaper known as the Bridgeport Press, and changing the name to the Bridgeport Standard, became its editor. He continued the publication of this paper—for most of the time alone—until 1863, when he retired from active business.

Pettingill was also involved in politics, holding multiple elective offices. He was elected to the Connecticut House of Representatives, and in 1845 to the Connecticut State Senate. For four years, he was United States Marshal. He died at his residence in Bridgeport, January 17, 1882, aged 73 years.

He was twice married. His first wife, Elizabeth Philipps, of Danbury, Connecticut, died about 1843. He then married Catherine A. Burroughs, daughter of Isaac Burroughs, of Bridgeport, who survived him, without children.

This article incorporates public domain material from the 1882 Yale Obituary Record.
