= Allison Chamberlain =

American epidemiologist

- Education: University of Virginia; Georgetown University; Emory University
- Occupation: Epidemiologist

Allison T. Chamberlain is an infectious disease epidemiologist. She is the director of the COVID-19 Response Collaborative (ECRC) and the acting director of the Emory Center for Public Health Preparedness and Research. Her background is in public health preparedness and defense policy. She is also a Research Associate Professor in the Department of Epidemiology at the Rollins School of Public Health. Her interests include Legionnaires' disease, and vaccine promotion, especially maternal vaccination.

== Education ==
Chamberlain earned her BA at the University of Virginia (2004), an MS from Georgetown University in 2007 and a Ph.D. from Emory University in 2015.

== Selected publications ==
- Adams, Carly; Wortley, Pascale; Chamberlain, Allison; Lopman, Benjamin A (1 August 2022). "Declining COVID-19 case-fatality in Georgia, USA, March 2020 to March 2021: a sign of real improvement or a broadening epidemic?". Annals of Epidemiology. 72: 57–64. doi:10.1016/j.annepidem.2022.05.008. PMC 9148435. PMID 35649472.
- Loretan, Caitlin, Allison T. Chamberlain, Travis Sanchez, Maria Zlotorzynska, and Jeb Jones. "Trends and characteristics associated with human papillomavirus vaccination uptake among men who have sex with men in the United States, 2014–2017." Sexually transmitted diseases 46, no. 7 (2019): 465-473.
- Chamberlain, Allison T., Katherine Seib, Kevin A. Ault, Walter A. Orenstein, Paula M. Frew, Fauzia Malik, Marielysse Cortés et al. "Factors associated with intention to receive influenza and tetanus, diphtheria, and acellular pertussis (Tdap) vaccines during pregnancy: a focus on vaccine hesitancy and perceptions of disease severity and vaccine safety." PLoS currents 7 (2015).
- Hitchcock, Penny, Allison Chamberlain, Megan Van Wagoner, Thomas V. Inglesby, and Tara O'Toole. "Challenges to global surveillance and response to infectious disease outbreaks of international importance." Biosecurity and bioterrorism: biodefense strategy, practice, and science 5, no. 3 (2007): 206-227.
