= Alison (footballer, born 1998) =

Brazilian footballer (born 1998)

Personal information
- Full name: Alison Felipe dos Santos Natividade
- Date of birth: 16 February 1998 (age 28)
- Place of birth: Inhangapi, Brazil
- Height: 1.82 m (6 ft 0 in)
- Position: Centre-back

Team information
- Current team: Amazonas

Youth career
- Castanhal

Senior career*
| Years | Team | Apps | (Gls) |
| 2019–2021 | Castanhal | 11 | (2) |
| 2019 | → Galvez (loan) | 1 | (0) |
| 2019 | → União Luziense (loan) | 4 | (0) |
| 2020 | → Fast Clube (loan) | 18 | (0) |
| 2021 | → Marília (loan) | 0 | (0) |
| 2022– | Amazonas | 56 | (1) |
- * Club domestic league appearances and goals as of 15:44, 5 March 2024 (UTC)

Alison Felipe dos Santos Natividade (born 16 February 1998), simply known as Alison, is a Brazilian footballer who plays as a centre-back for Amazonas.

== Career ==
Born in Pitimandeua, a quilombo settlement within the city of Inhangapi, Pará, Alison began his career with local side Castanhal. He made his first team debut with the side in the 2019 Campeonato Paraense, before moving on loan to Galvez on 30 April of that year.

After featuring in just one match for Galvez, Alison spent a period at União Luziense before joining Fast Clube on 16 January 2020. A regular starter, he signed for Marília on 4 February 2021, but returned to his parent club on 7 June, after making no appearances.

On 24 November 2021, Alison agreed to a contract with Amazonas.

== Career statistics ==
As of 5 March 2024.

| Club | Season | League | | | State League | | Cup | | Continental | | Other | | Total | |
| Club | Season | Division | Apps | Goals | Apps | Goals | Apps | Goals | Apps | Goals | Apps | Goals | Apps | Goals |
|---|---|---|---|---|---|---|---|---|---|---|---|---|---|---|
| Castanhal | 2019 | Paraense | — | | 8 | 1 | — | | — | | — | | 8 | 1 |
| Castanhal | 2021 | Série D | 3 | 1 | — | | — | | — | | 0 | 0 | 3 | 1 |
| Castanhal | Total | | 3 | 1 | 8 | 1 | — | | — | | 0 | 0 | 11 | 2 |
| Galvez (loan) | 2019 | Série D | 1 | 0 | — | | — | | — | | — | | 1 | 0 |
| União Luziense (loan) | 2019 | Mineiro Segunda Divisão | — | | 4 | 0 | — | | — | | — | | 4 | 0 |
| Fast Clube (loan) | 2020 | Série D | 18 | 0 | — | | 0 | 0 | — | | — | | 18 | 0 |
| Marília (loan) | 2021 | Paulista A3 | — | | 0 | 0 | 0 | 0 | — | | — | | 9 | 0 |
| Amazonas | 2022 | Série D | 17 | 0 | 12 | 0 | — | | — | | — | | 29 | 0 |
| Amazonas | 2023 | Série C | 6 | 0 | 13 | 1 | — | | — | | — | | 19 | 1 |
| Amazonas | 2024 | Série B | 0 | 0 | 8 | 0 | 1 | 0 | — | | — | | 9 | 0 |
| Amazonas | Total | | 23 | 0 | 33 | 1 | 1 | 0 | — | | — | | 57 | 1 |
| Career total | | | 45 | 1 | 45 | 2 | 1 | 0 | 0 | 0 | 0 | 0 | 91 | 3 |

== Honours ==
Amazonas

- Campeonato Amazonense: 2023
- Campeonato Brasileiro Série C: 2023
