= Silvio Allason =

Italian painter

Silvio Allason (1845–1912) was an Italian painter, mainly of landscapes, seascapes, and moonlit nocturnes.

He was a resident in Turin. He first trained with his elder cousin, Ernesto Allason. He captures on canvas the calm melancholy of the Alps, the terrible impetuosity of the sea, and the landscapes of moonlit nights. He exhibited in 1877 in Naples, a canvas titled: A noi e Salvataggio; Dopo la tempesta e Sconfitti, exhibited at Turin in 1880. He also painted A Morning at Thuille. In 1887 in Venice, he exhibited: Solitudine. Among his other works: L ' agguato notturno, landscape; At the Montagna and Il gran Cervino (Matterhorn), near the bacino di Breuil in Val Tournanche. Of this artist, the critic Massarani spoke praises, and Levi took note of his nocturnes.

== Gallery ==
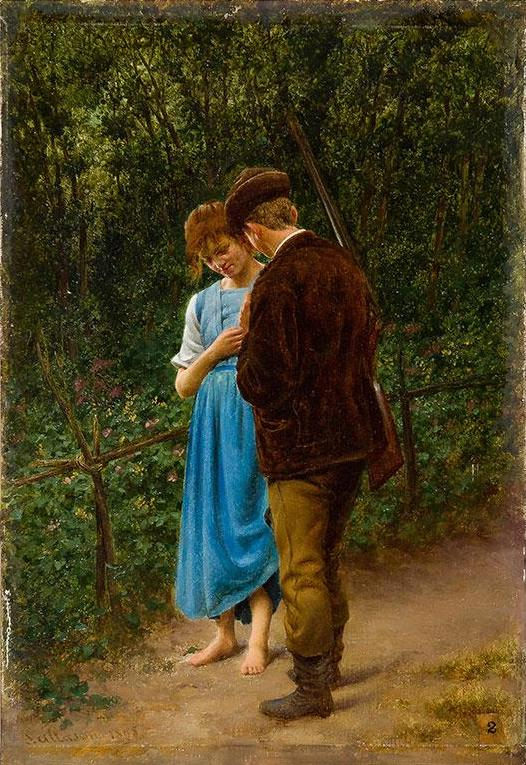
Preda al Melezet

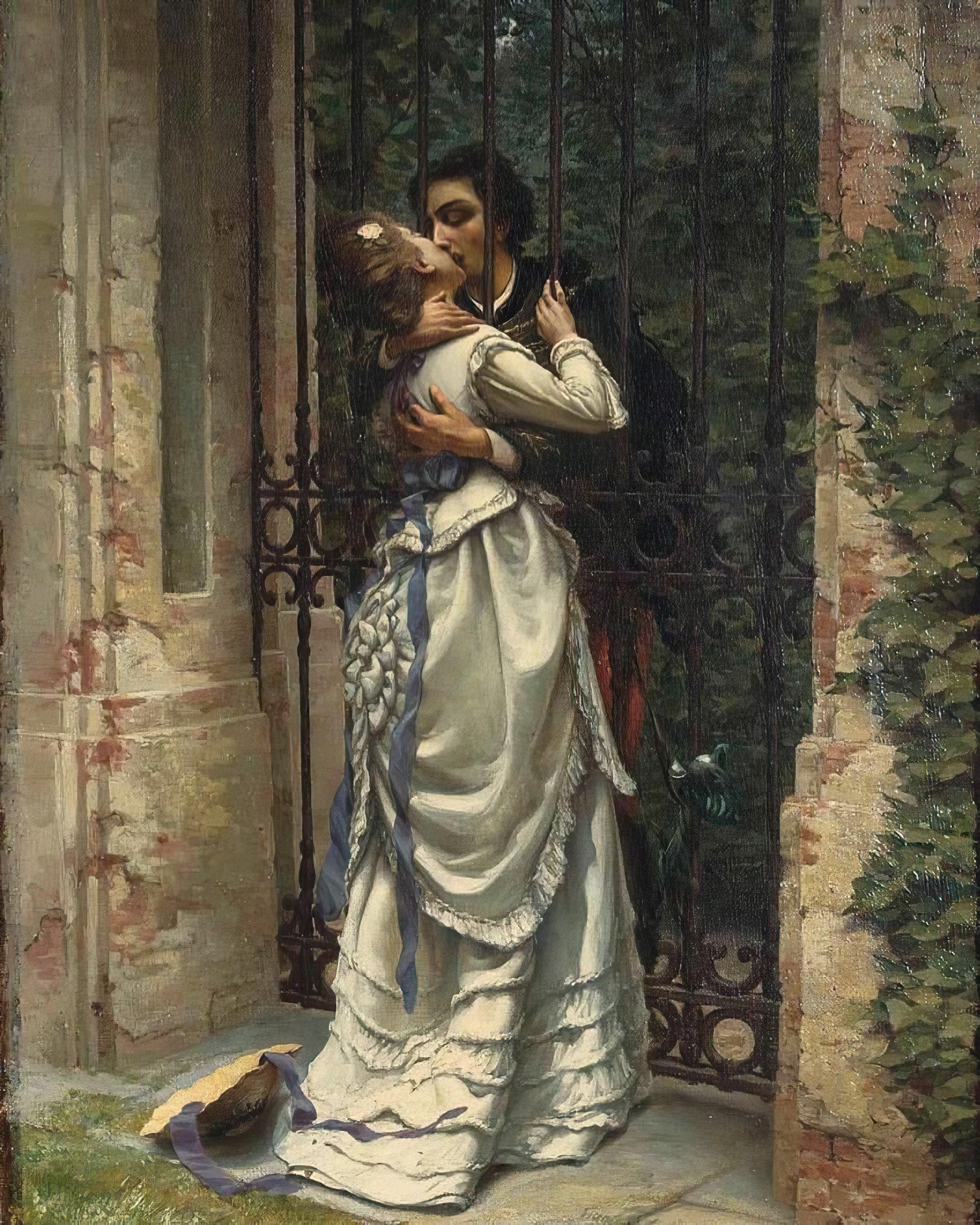
The Kiss

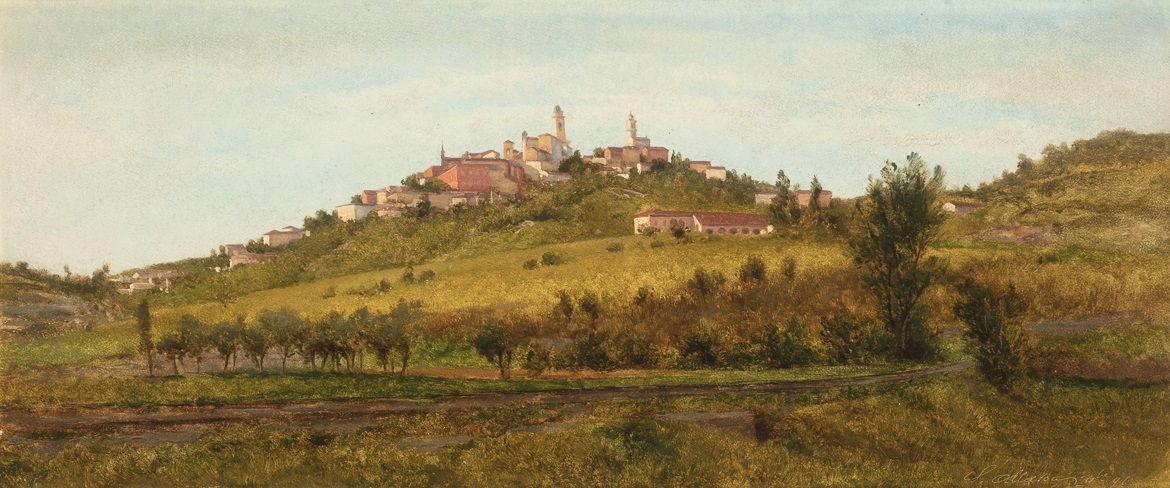
Landscape on the Hill
