= Allison Township, Pennsylvania =

Township in Pennsylvania, US

- Township
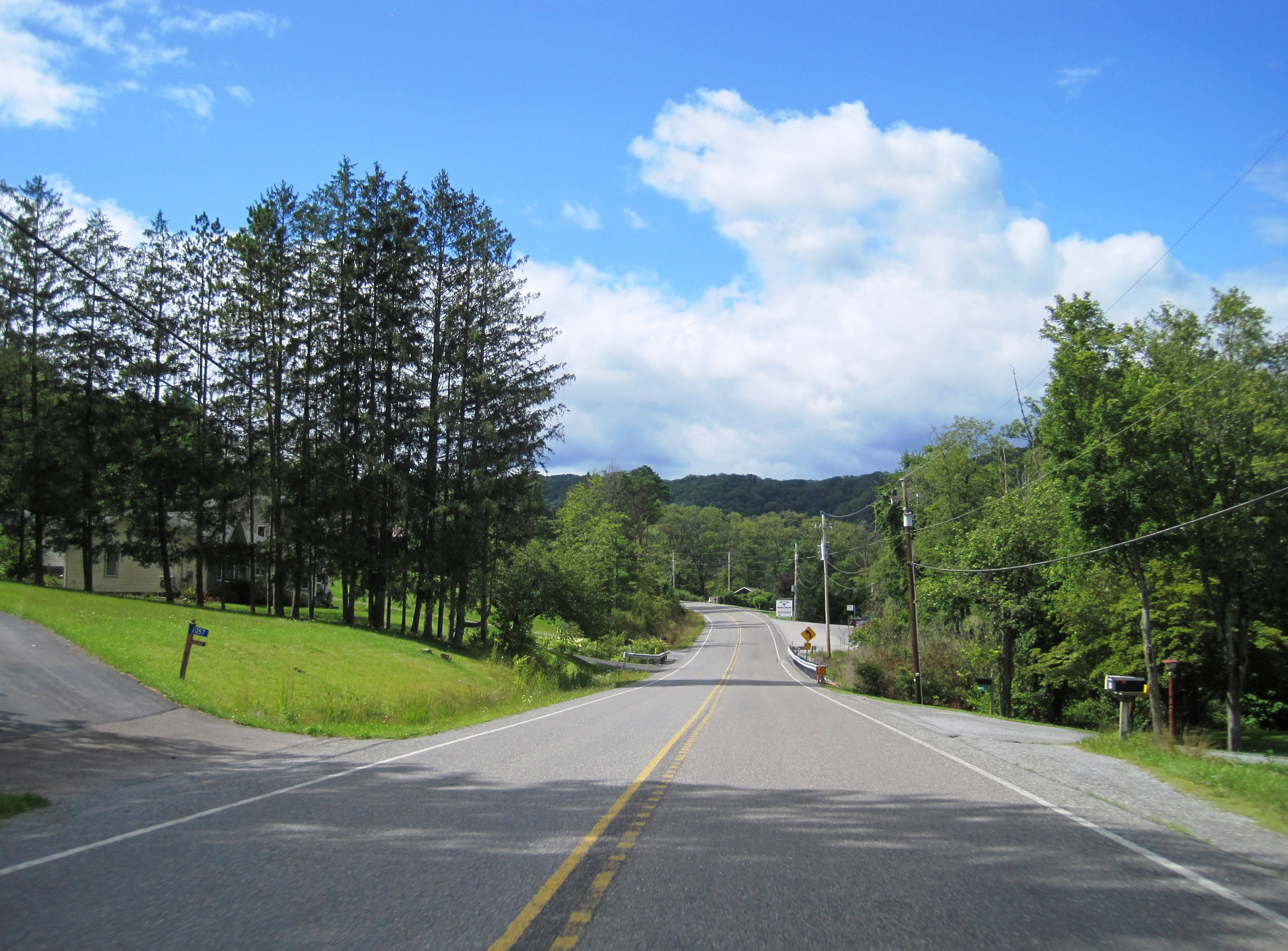
- PA 120 westbound in Allison Township

- Location in Clinton County and the U.S. state of Pennsylvania.
- Country: United States
- State: Pennsylvania
- County: Clinton
- Settled: 1850
- Incorporated: Before 1839

Area
  - Total: 1.63 sq mi (4.21 km^{2})
  - Land: 1.53 sq mi (3.95 km^{2})
  - Water: 0.10 sq mi (0.27 km^{2})

Population (2020)
  - Total: 228 ▲
  - Estimate (2021): 228
  - Density: 128.0/sq mi (49.42/km^{2})
- FIPS code: 42-035-02032

Allison Township is a township in Clinton County, Pennsylvania, United States. The population was 228 at the 2020 census.

== Geography ==
Allison Township is in southern Clinton County, bordered on the east by the West Branch Susquehanna River, the city of Lock Haven, and the borough of Flemington, and on the west by Bald Eagle Township. According to the United States Census Bureau, the township has a total area of 1.6 square miles (4.2 km^{2}), of which 1.5 square miles (3.9 km^{2}) is land and 0.1 square miles (0.3 km^{2}), or 6.38%, is water.

== Demographics ==
Historical population
Census	Pop.	Note	%±
1980	237		—
1990	191		−19.4%
2000	198		3.7%
2010	193		−2.5%
2020	228		18.1%
2021 (est.)	228		0.0%

As of the census of 2000, there were 198 people, 77 households, and 60 families residing in the township. The population density was 105.8 inhabitants per square mile (40.8/km^{2}). There were 81 housing units at an average density of 43.3 per square mile (16.7/km^{2}). The racial makeup of the township was 99.49% White, and 0.51% from two or more races. Hispanic or Latino of any race were 0.51% of the population.

There were 77 households, out of which 27.3% had children under the age of 18 living with them, 68.8% were married couples living together, 7.8% had a female householder with no husband present, and 20.8% were non-families. 18.2% of all households were made up of individuals, and 7.8% had someone living alone who was 65 years of age or older. The average household size was 2.57 and the average family size was 2.87.

In the township the population was spread out, with 18.2% under the age of 18, 7.1% from 18 to 24, 27.3% from 25 to 44, 28.3% from 45 to 64, and 19.2% who were 65 years of age or older. The median age was 44 years. For every 100 females, there were 85.0 males. For every 100 females age 18 and over, there were 88.4 males.

The median income for a household in the township was $38,929, and the median income for a family was $50,125. Males had a median income of $35,000 versus $24,375 for females. The per capita income for the township was $25,265. About 6.3% of families and 7.1% of the population were below the poverty line, including 2.9% of those under the age of eighteen and 18.9% of those sixty five or over.
