= Fresh Water (album) =

Studio album by Alison McCallum
- Released: March 1972
- Genre: Rock/Blues
- Label: RCA Records
- Producer: Simon Napier-Bell

Alison McCallum chronology
Fresh Water (1972)	Any Way You Want Me (1974)

Fresh Water is the debut album by Australian rock and blues singer Alison McCallum, released in 1972. Rare for an Australian artist at the time, it came in a gatefold sleeve. It was re-issued in 1974 under the title Any Way You Want Me in a single sleeve with new artwork.

== Track listing ==
1. Fresh Water (Simon Napier-Bell) – 3:25
2. Ain't Eatin' Dinner Tonight (Simon Napier-Bell) – 3:15
3. Any Way You Want Me (Chip Taylor) – 2:32
4. Lean Woman Blues (Marc Bolan) – 4:23
5. Take Me Back (Ted Mulry) – 4:27
6. The Last Time (Mick Jagger/Keith Richards) – 3:21
7. Organ Grinder Blues (Clarence Williams) – 5:56
8. Hippy Gumbo (Marc Bolan) – 4:41
9. If It Ain't Hard, It Ain't Easy (Simon Napier-Bell) – 4:09
10. Superman (Harry Vanda/George Young) – 2:29

== Known personnel ==
- Alison McCallum: Vocals, Backing Vocals
- Phil Manning: Guitar
- Bobbi Marchini: Backing Vocals

== Production ==
- Simon Napier-Bell: Producer
- John Hall: Cover Concept
- Craig Stiles: Artwork
- Ian Potter: Photography
