= Alison White (cricketer) =

English cricketer

Personal information
- Full name: Alison Kingsley Gordon White
- Born: 2 January 1881; Sydney, New South Wales, Australia
- Died: 20 March 1962 (aged 81); Crowborough, Sussex, England
- Batting: Right-handed
- Bowling: Right-arm fast-medium

Domestic team information
- Years: Team
- 1913–1919: Gloucestershire
- 1919: Free Foresters
- FC debut: 11 July 1912 Gloucestershire v Sussex
- Last FC: 19 July 1919 Gloucestershire v Sussex

Career statistics
Competition	First-class
Matches	13
Runs scored	442
Batting average	19.21
100s/50s	0/2
Top score	54
Catches/stumpings	7/–
- Source: CricInfo, 29 March 2014

Lieutenant-colonel Alison Kingsley Gordon White DSO (2 January 1881 – 20 March 1962), in later life sometimes known as Alison Kingsley Gordon-White or occasionally as Alison Kingsley Gordon Gordon-White, was an English soldier who played first-class cricket before and after World War I. He served as a professional soldier in the British Army from 1900 to 1933.

== Early life ==
One of seven siblings, White was born at Sydney in Australia in January 1881. His father, William Moore White, was a presbyterian minister from Carrickfergus in County Antrim working in Australia, whilst his mother Eliza Gordon, had been born in Australia. The family returned to Britain, where his father was ordained in the Church of England. They lived in Surrey and Hampshire and then at Cheltenham. White, who was the youngest son of the family, was educated at Cheltenham College, where he was senior prefect in his final year, before going up to Clare College, Cambridge in 1900.

== Military service ==
Both of White's older brothers had attended Clare during the 1890s. Alison White, however, did not graduate, instead joining the Royal Horse Artillery (RHA). in December 1900 with a direct commission as a second lieutenant. He was promoted to lieutenant in 1903 and captain in 1912, serving in L Battery, RHA. At the start of World War I the battery was deployed in France with the British Expeditionary Force and took part in the Affair of Néry during the Great Retreat following the Battle of Mons in 1914. White was attached to 39th Brigade Royal Field Artillery (RFA) ammunition train and, in 1915, was promoted to the rank of major, serving with the RFA.

By 1916 White had moved to serve as a staff officer and spent the remainder of the war on the General Staff. He was awarded the Distinguished Service Order in 1916 and was mentioned in despatches five times during the war. In 1919 he was promoted to brevet lieutenant-colonel and continued to serve in the Royal Artillery after the war. He was promoted to full lieutenant-colonel in 1929 and retired in 1933.

== Cricket ==
White had played cricket and rugby union at school. He was in the Cheltenham cricket XI for three years and captained the team in 1899 and 1900, and played rugby in the XV in 1899–00. Wisden described him as the "pick of the [Cheltenham] batsmen" in 1899, praising his "strong defence" although commenting that his attacking strokes were "tame". He was the school's leading run scorer with 437 runs.

In the army he played regularly for the Royal Artillery Cricket Club and made his first-class debut for Gloucestershire in 1912. On debut against Sussex he made scores of nine and 38 and played two more matches for the team the following season. In 1914 he played for Northumberland.

Ten of White's 13 first-class matches were played during 1919. He made eight appearances for Gloucestershire and played twice for Free Foresters against both Cambridge University and Oxford. He scored two half-centuries, making 54 for Gloucestershire in the team's first match of the season and 53 for Free Foresters against Cambridge in June. In total White scored 442 first-class runs.

== Later life ==
White passed the limit for recall to the forces in 1936. He died at Crowborough in Sussex in 1962. He was aged 81.
