= Allison Township, Brown County, South Dakota =

Township in Brown County, South Dakota

Coordinates: 45°48′30″N 98°39′46″W

- Interactive map of Allison Township, Brown County, South Dakota
- Country: United States

Allison Township is a township in Brown County, South Dakota, United States.

According to the 2010 census, there were 20 people residing in the township of Allison. The population density was 0.22 inhabitants/km².
