= Allyson =

Allyson is a given name and surname, a variant form of Alison.

== People with the given name Allyson ==
- Allyson Aires dos Santos (born 1990), Brazilian football defender
- Allyson Araújo Santos (born 1982), Brazilian football player
- Ally Brooke (born 1993), American singer and member of Fifth Harmony from 2012 to 2018
- Allyson Clay (born 1953), Canadian visual artist
- Allyson Kay Duncan (born 1951), American federal judge
- Allyson Felix (born 1985), retired American track and field sprint athlete
- Allyson Hennessy (1948–2011), Trinidadian television presenter
- Ally Malott (born 1992), American basketball player
- Allyson Maynard Gibson (born 1957), Bahamian barrister politician and community rights advocate
- Allyson McConnell (1978–2013), Australian convicted killer
- Allyson Schwartz (born 1948), American politician
- Ally Sentnor (born 2004), American soccer player
- Allyson Simpson (born 2000), American ice hockey player
- Allyson West, Trinidad and Tobago politician

== People with the surname Allyson ==
- June Allyson (1917–2006), Golden Globe-winning American film and television actress
- Karrin Allyson (21st century), Grammy-nominated jazz vocalist

== See also ==
- Alison (name)
- Alisoun (disambiguation)
- Allison (surname)
- Alyson
