= Alyson =

Alyson is a given name, a variant form of Alison. Notable people with the name include:

== Given name ==
- Alyson (singer) (21st century), American singer
- Alyson Annan (born 1973), former field hockey player
- Alyson Bailes (1949–2016), former English diplomat
- Alyson Brooks (born c. 1980), American theoretical astrophysicist
- Alyson Cambridge (born 1980), American operatic soprano and classical music, jazz, and American popular song singer
- Alyson Court (born 1973), Canadian actress
- Alyson Croft (born 1975), American actress
- Alyson Habetz, American softball coach
- Alyson Hannigan (born 1974), American actress
- Alyson Hau (born 1983), Hong Kong radio personality
- Alyson Hunter (born 1948), New Zealand photographer and print maker
- Alyson Jones (born 1956), former swimming champion
- Alyson Kennedy (born 1950), American Communist politician
- Alyson Kiperman (born 1977), American actress
- Alyson Michalka (born 1989), American actress and singer-songwriter. Commonly known as Aly from the duo Aly and AJ.
- Alyson Reed (born 1958), American dancer and actress
- Alyson Rudd (born 1963), English sports journalist
- Alyson Spiro (21st century), British television actress
- Alyson Stoner (born 1993), American actress, singer and dancer.
- Alyson Williams (born 1962), African American rhythm and blues musician
- Alyson Zalta, American clinical psychologist

== Surname ==
- Sasha Alyson (born 1952), American businessman

== See also ==
- Alison (given name)
- Allyson
- Alyson Avenue
