= Alyson (singer) =

American singer-songwriter

- Born: New York City, New York, U.S.
- Origin: Los Angeles, California, U.S.
- Genres: House, Dance-pop
- Instrument: Vocals
- Years active: 2004-present
- Labels: PM Media

Alyson is an American pop dance singer-songwriter and producer from Los Angeles.

== Career ==
Alyson's debut album Take a Good Look released on her own label, PM Media, was released on May 17, 2005. The album features the hits "Baby Come Back", "What're Your Gonna Do", "Nothin' More To Say", "Feel You", "Take A Gook Look" and "Forever", the fifth song from her debut album to hit the Top 10 on the Hot Dance Club Play and to become Hot Dance Airplay hits, and hit number one on the World Dance/Trance Singles Chart. It also gained Rhythmic, Top 40 and AC format radio airplay.

Alyson's second album, Hey You, was released on March 18, 2008. The title track became the lead single. "Shoobadoo" reached number 2 on Hot 100 Singles Chart. Later, "Sticky Sticky" was number 1 on Top 40 and AC/Hot Charts. "Slip Away" reached 1 for 2 weeks on The Independent Music Network charts.

Her songs became successful on the charts in a few countries such as "Adios Barcelona" "Hey You" hit various spots on the national Hot 100 Radio Chart (Top 40 & AC) in New Music Weekly Magazine. She is described as the "indie princess of pop".

=== Albums ===
- Take a Good Look (2005)
- Hey You (2008)

=== Singles ===
Year	Song	Peak chart positions	
Year	Song	U.S. Dance/Club	U.S. Dance Singles Sales
2004	"Baby Come Back"	-	-
2004	"What're You Gonna Do"	4	-
2004	"Feel You"	7	-
2005	"Nothin' More To Say"	9	-
2006	"Take a Good Look"	13	-
2007	"Forever"	8	8
2008	"Hey You"	-	-
2008	"Here With Me"	4	-
2008	"Adios Barcelona"	33	-
