= Alisson (footballer, born 2008) =

Brazilian footballer (born 2008)

Personal information
- Full name: Alisson Rodrigues de Melo
- Date of birth: 31 July 2008 (age 18)
- Place of birth: Porto Alegre, Brazil
- Height: 1.77 m (5 ft 10 in)
- Position: Left-back

Team information
- Current team: Internacional
- Number: 30

Youth career
- 2016–: Internacional

Senior career*
Years	Team	Apps	(Gls)
2025–	Internacional	1	(0)
- * Club domestic league appearances and goals as of 17:32, 19 November 2025 (UTC)

Alisson Rodrigues de Melo (born 31 July 2008), simply known as Alisson, is a Brazilian professional footballer who plays as a left-back for Internacional.

== Career ==
Born in Porto Alegre, Rio Grande do Sul, Alisson joined the youth categories of hometown club Internacional in 2016, aged eight. After progressing through the youth setup, he began training with the first team in October 2025.

Alisson made his first team – and Série A – debut on 22 October 2025; after coming on as a half-time substitute for Alexandro Bernabei, he was sent off after 27 minutes on the field during a 1–0 away loss to Bahia.

== Career statistics ==
As of 19 November 2025

Appearances and goals by club, season and competition
Club	Season	League			State League		National Cup		Continental		Other		Total	
Club	Season	Division	Apps	Goals	Apps	Goals	Apps	Goals	Apps	Goals	Apps	Goals	Apps	Goals
Internacional	2025	Série A	1	0	0	0	0	0	0	0	—		1	0
Career total			1	0	0	0	0	0	0	0	0	0	1	0
