= 2021 Grêmio FBPA season =

Grêmio
2021 season
- President: Romildo Bolzan Jr.
- Manager: Renato Portaluppi (until 15 April); Thiago Gomes (caretaker) (16 – 20 April, 4 – 8 July, 11 – 14 October); Tiago Nunes (from 21 April – until 4 July); Luiz Felipe Scolari (from 8 July – until 11 October); Vagner Mancini (since 14 October)
- Stadium: Arena do Grêmio
- Brasileiro Série A: 17th
- Campeonato Gaúcho: Winners
- Copa do Brasil: Quarter-finals
- CONMEBOL Libertadores: Third stage
- CONMEBOL Sudamericana: Round of 16
- Recopa Gaúcha: Winners
- Top goalscorer: League: Diego Souza (10); All: Diego Souza (24)
- Biggest win: 8–0 vs. Aragua
- Biggest defeat: 0–4 vs. Flamengo
Home colours	Away colours	Third colours

The 2021 season is Grêmio Foot-Ball Porto Alegrense's 118th season in existence and the club's 16th consecutive season in the top flight of Brazilian football. In addition to the domestic league, Grêmio participates in this season's editions of the Copa do Brasil, the Campeonato Gaúcho, the Copa CONMEBOL Libertadores and the Copa CONMEBOL Sudamericana. The season covers the period from 1 March 2021 to 31 December 2021, a shorter season due to the COVID-19 pandemic.

== Squad information ==
=== First team squad ===
As of 9 November 2021.

Note: Flags indicate national team as defined under FIFA eligibility rules; some limited exceptions apply. Players may hold more than one non-FIFA nationality.

No.	Pos.	Nation	Player
3	DF	BRA	Pedro Geromel (captain)
4	DF	ARG	Walter Kannemann (vice-captain)
5	MF	BRA	Thiago Santos
6	DF	BRA	Leonardo Gomes
7	MF	COL	Jaminton Campaz
9	FW	COL	Miguel Borja (on loan from Palmeiras)
10	FW	BRA	Douglas Costa (on loan from Juventus)
11	FW	BRA	Ferreira
12	DF	BRA	Bruno Cortez
13	DF	BRA	Rafinha (3rd captain)
15	MF	BRA	Darlan
16	MF	BRA	Lucas Silva
19	FW	ARG	Diego Churín
20	GK	BRA	Brenno
21	MF	PAR	Mathías Villasanti
22	FW	BRA	Éverton
23	FW	BRA	Alisson

No.	Pos.	Nation	Player
25	FW	BRA	Jhonata Robert
26	DF	BRA	Rodrigues
28	DF	BRA	Paulo Miranda
29	FW	BRA	Diego Souza
31	GK	BRA	Adriel
32	DF	BRA	Diogo Barbosa
33	FW	BRA	Luiz Fernando (on loan from Botafogo)
34	GK	BRA	Gabriel Chapecó
35	DF	BRA	Vanderson
36	DF	BRA	Guilherme Guedes
38	FW	BRA	Léo Pereira (on loan from Ituano)
42	MF	BRA	Fernando Henrique
44	DF	BRA	Ruan (on loan from Sassuolo)
49	MF	BRA	Sarará
50	MF	BRA	Victor Bobsin
88	MF	BRA	Jean Pyerre

== Competitions ==
=== Overview ===
Competition	First match	Last match	Starting round	Final position	Record							
Competition	First match	Last match	Starting round	Final position	Pld	W	D	L	GF	GA	GD	Win %
Campeonato Brasileiro Série A	30 May	9 December	Matchday 1	17th	38	12	7	19	44	51	−7	31.58
Campeonato Gaúcho	3 March	23 May	First stage	Winners	15	10	4	1	30	12	+18	66.67
Copa do Brasil	2 June	15 September	Third round	Quarter-finals	6	3	1	2	6	6	+0	50.00
Copa CONMEBOL Libertadores	10 March	14 April	Second stage	Third stage	4	2	0	2	10	6	+4	50.00
Copa CONMEBOL Sudamericana	22 April	20 July	Group stage	Round of 16	8	6	1	1	23	7	+16	75.00
Recopa Gaúcha	6 June		Final	Winners	1	1	0	0	3	0	+3	100.00
Total					72	34	13	25	116	82	+34	47.22

Source: Soccerway

=== Recopa Gaúcha ===
6 June Final	Grêmio	3–0	Santa Cruz-RS	Porto Alegre
10:30 UTC−3	G. Azevedo 53'; L. Pereira (yellow card) 37', (goal) 65'; Robert 90+1'	Report	Fogaça (yellow card) 42'; Laion (yellow card) 55'; D. Rocha (yellow card) 66'	Stadium: Arena do Grêmio; Attendance: 0 Referee: Érico Carvalho

=== Campeonato Gaúcho ===
==== Results summary ====
Overall								Home						Away					
Pld	W	D	L	GF	GA	GD	Pts	W	D	L	GF	GA	GD	W	D	L	GF	GA	GD
15	10	4	1	30	12	+18	34	6	1	0	17	3	+14	4	3	1	13	9	+4

Last updated: 24 May 2021.
Source: Soccerway

==== First stage ====
===== Table =====
Pos	Team	Pld	W	D	L	GF	GA	GD	Pts	Qualification or relegation
1	Grêmio	11	7	3	1	23	9	+14	24	Qualification to Knockout stage
2	Internacional	11	7	2	2	24	9	+15	23	Qualification to Knockout stage
3	Juventude	11	5	2	4	14	12	+2	17	Qualification to Knockout stage
4	Caxias	11	4	5	2	13	11	+2	17	Qualification to Knockout stage
5	Ypiranga-RS	11	4	4	3	20	15	+5	16	

Updated to match(es) played on 25 April 2021. Source: Soccerway
Rules for classification: 1) Points; 2) Wins; 3) Goal difference; 4) Goals scored; 5) fewest red cards; 6) fewest yellow cards; 7) Draw in the headquarters of the FGF.

===== Results by matchday =====
Matchday	1	2	3	4	5	6	7	8	9	10	11
Ground	A (Note: Matchday 1 vs. Caxias postponed until Matchday 9.)	H	A (Note: Matchday 3 vs. São José postponed until Matchday 5.)	A	H	A	H	A	H	H	A
Result	D	W	D	W	W	L	W	D	W	W	W
Position	7	4	6	5	4 (Note: Position before rescheduled Matchday 3.)	3	2	2	1 (Note: Position before rescheduled Matchday 1.)	1	1

Updated to match(es) played on 25 April 2021. Source: Soccerway
A = Away; H = Home; W = Win; D = Draw; L = Loss

===== Matches =====
The first stage fixtures were announced on 21 December 2020.

Note: Match numbers indicated on the left hand side are references to the matchday scheduled by the Campeonato Gaúcho and not the order matches were played after postponements and rescheduled matches.

3 March 2	Grêmio	4–1	Brasil (PE)	Porto Alegre
20:00 UTC−3	Silva 15' (pen.); Ferreira 20', (red card) 77'; Azevedo 29'; Isaque 54'; Thaciano (yellow card) 61'; Braz (yellow card) 71'	Report	Araujo (yellow card) 12'; Héverton (yellow card) 14'; Miranda (yellow card) 23'; Krobel 48'	Stadium: Arena do Grêmio; Attendance: 0 Referee: Roger Goulart

13 March 4	Esportivo	0–2	Grêmio	Bento Gonçalves
20:00 UTC−3	Hulk (yellow card) 64'	Report	Thaciano 25'; Araújo 77' (pen.)	Stadium: Estádio Montanha dos Vinhedos; Attendance: 0 Referee: Jonathan Pinheiro

19 March 5	Grêmio	2–0	Aimoré	Porto Alegre
20:00 UTC−3	Azevedo 32' (pen.); Ricardinho 42'; Ruan (yellow card) 80'	Report	Marabá (yellow card) 40'; Wesley (yellow card) 42'	Stadium: Arena do Grêmio; Attendance: 0 Referee: Lucas Horn

22 March 3	São José-RS	1–1	Grêmio	Porto Alegre
20:00 UTC−3	França (yellow card) 31'; Tavares (yellow card) 56'; L. Eduardo 54', (yellow card) 69'; Fabiano (yellow card) 90+2'; Wagner (yellow card) 90+3'	Report	Araújo (yellow card) 24'; Brenno (yellow card) 54'; P. Lucas 73'; P. Lucas (yellow card) 74'; Chú (yellow card) 79' (yellow-red card) 90+3'; Ruan (yellow card) 90+2'	Stadium: Estádio Francisco Novelletto Neto; Attendance: 0 Referee: Douglas Schwengber

25 March 6	Juventude	2–1	Grêmio	Bento Gonçalves (Note: The Juventude vs. Grêmio match was played at the Estádio Montanha dos Vinhedos, Bento Gonçalves, instead of their regular stadium Estádio Alfredo Jaconi, Caxias do Sul, who was having his stadium renovated on the date of the match.)
21:30 UTC−3	Peixoto 63'; Eltinho 67' (pen.), (yellow card) 69'	Report	Ricardinho 45+2'; Ruan (yellow card) 65'	Stadium: Estádio Montanha dos Vinhedos; Attendance: 0 Referee: Vinícius Gomes

28 March 7	Grêmio	4–0	Pelotas	Porto Alegre
21:00 UTC−3	Heitor (yellow card) 55'; Ricardinho 67'; Alisson 71'; D. Souza 77'; Ferreira 79'	Report	Vieira (yellow card) 79' (yellow-red card) 86'	Stadium: Arena do Grêmio; Attendance: 0 Referee: Eleno Todeschini

31 March 8	São Luiz	2–2	Grêmio	Passo Fundo (Note: The São Luiz vs. Grêmio match was played at the Estádio Vermelhão da Serra, Passo Fundo, instead of their regular stadium Estádio 19 de Outubro, Ijuí, due to a punishment for acts of racial insult practiced by a São Luiz supporter in the 2020 Campeonato Gaúcho, thus preventing the club from playing in its regular stadium.)
22:00 UTC−3	Xuxa 18'; Santos 59'	Report	Pereira 11', (yellow card) 41'; Chú 72'; Silva (yellow card) 80'	Stadium: Estádio Vermelhão da Serra; Attendance: 0 Referee: Leandro Vuaden

3 April 9	Grêmio	1–0	Internacional	Porto Alegre
22:15 UTC−3	Vanderson (yellow card) 83'; Chú 88', (yellow card) 89'	Report		Stadium: Arena do Grêmio; Attendance: 0 Referee: Anderson Daronco

16 April 1	Caxias	0–0	Grêmio	Caxias do Sul
20:00 UTC−3	J. Cley (yellow card) 41'; Tontini (yellow card) 88'; Diniz (yellow card) 89'	Report	Ruan (yellow card) 85'	Stadium: Estádio Centenário; Attendance: 0 Referee: Anderson Farias

18 April 10	Grêmio	3–1	Novo Hamburgo	Porto Alegre
20:00 UTC−3	J. Pyerre 28'; D. Souza 33', 63'; Rodrigues (yellow card) 45'	Report	Marcão (yellow card) 36'; Elias (yellow card) 43'; Kayron 78'	Stadium: Arena do Grêmio; Attendance: 0 Referee: Jean Pierre Lima

24 April 11	Ypiranga-RS	2–3	Grêmio	Erechim
21:00 UTC−3	Zé Mário (yellow card) 42', (goal) 51'; Caprini (yellow card) 49'; Mossoró 53'; Mikael (yellow card) 72' (yellow-red card) 83'; L. Eduardo (yellow card) 79'	Report	Rodrigues (yellow card) 11'; D. Souza 24' (pen.); L. Pereira 27'; Vanderson 29', (yellow card) 50'; Cortez (yellow card) 36'; M. Henrique (yellow card) 52'; Brenno (yellow card) 77'; Rafinha (yellow card) 90+5'	Stadium: Estádio Colosso da Lagoa; Attendance: 0 Referee: Eder Zanella

==== Knockout stage ====
===== Semi-finals =====
2 May First leg	Caxias	1–2	Grêmio	Caxias do Sul
19:00 UTC−3	Marlon 45+2'; Pitol (yellow card) 45+5'; Gomez (yellow card) 82'	Report	D. Souza 23', 84' (pen.); Geromel (yellow card) 45+6'; Rafinha (yellow card) 49'; T. Santos (yellow card) 59'; Churín (yellow card) 90+3'	Stadium: Estádio Centenário; Attendance: 0 Referee: Vinícius Gomes

9 May Second leg	Grêmio	2–0	Caxias	Porto Alegre
16:00 UTC−3	M. Henrique 29', (yellow card) 66'; Ferreira 82'; T. Santos (yellow card) 75'	Report	G. Ramos (yellow card) 32'; Marlon (yellow card) 35'	Stadium: Arena do Grêmio; Attendance: 0 Referee: Jean Pierre Lima

===== Finals =====
16 May First leg	Internacional	1–2	Grêmio	Porto Alegre
16:00 UTC−3	Galhardo 27'; Dourado (yellow card) 56'; Praxedes (yellow card) 90+4'	Report	L. Pereira (yellow card) 18'; Maicon (yellow card) 49'; D. Souza 58'; Rafinha (yellow card) 73'; Ruan (yellow card) 82'; Ricardinho 88'; F. Henrique (yellow card) 90+3'	Stadium: Estádio Beira-Rio; Attendance: 0 Referee: Anderson Daronco

23 May Second leg	Grêmio	1–1 (3–2 agg.)	Internacional	Porto Alegre
16:00 UTC−3	D. Barbosa (yellow card) 19'; Rafinha (red card) 38'; T. Santos (yellow card) 45+5'; Ferreira 45+6'; Cortez (yellow card) 90+6'	Report	Rodinei (yellow card) 23'; Y. Alberto (red card) 39'; L. Ribeiro (yellow card) 55'; Dourado 67', (yellow card) 77'; Edenílson (yellow card) 90+2'	Stadium: Arena do Grêmio; Attendance: 0 Referee: Leandro Vuaden

=== Copa CONMEBOL Libertadores ===
==== Qualifying stages ====
The draw for the qualifying stages was held on 5 February 2021, 12:00 UTC−03:00.

===== Second stage =====
10 March First leg	Grêmio (Brazil)	6–1	(Peru) Ayacucho	Porto Alegre, Brazil
21:30 UTC−3	Braz 4'; Ferreira 28'; D. Souza 33' (pen.), 41', 86'; M. Henrique (yellow card) 76'; Azevedo 79'	Report	Salazar (yellow card) 14'; Mendieta (yellow card) 32'; Quina 73'; Firpo (yellow card) 77'	Stadium: Arena do Grêmio; Attendance: 0 Referee: Augusto Aragón (Ecuador)

16 March Second leg	Ayacucho (Peru)	1–2 (2–8 agg.)	(Brazil) Grêmio	Quito, Ecuador (Note: The Ayacucho vs. Grêmio match, originally scheduled to be played at the Estadio Inca Garcilaso de la Vega, Cusco, Peru, took place in Ecuador at the Estadio Olímpico Atahualpa, Quito, due to the Peruvian government not allowing Brazilians to enter the country because of the COVID-19 pandemic.)
21:30 UTC−3	Páucar (yellow card) 35'; Sosa 40'; Villamarín (yellow card) 45+1'; Mendieta (yellow card) 76'	Report	Ferreira 41'; Ruan (yellow card) 54'; F. Henrique (yellow card) 84'; Ricardinho 87'	Stadium: Estadio Olímpico Atahualpa; Attendance: 0 Referee: Esteban Ostojich (Uruguay)

===== Third stage =====
9 April First leg	Independiente del Valle (Ecuador)	2–1	(Brazil) Grêmio	Asunción, Paraguay (Note: The Independiente del Valle vs. Grêmio match would initially be played at the Estadio Rodrigo Paz Delgado, Quito, instead of their regular stadium Estadio Rumiñahui, Sangolquí, which was under reconstruction on the date of the match. However, due to cases of COVID-19 infection in Grêmio's squad, the Ecuadorian government has prohibited the match from taking place in his country. Because of this, CONMEBOL rescheduled the match from 7 April to 9 April, changing the place to Paraguay at the Estadio Defensores del Chaco, Asunción.)
19:15 UTC−3	Vite (yellow card) 10'; Favarelli 53', 61' (pen.); Mera (yellow card) 85'; García (yellow card) 85'	Report	D. Souza 9'; Rodrigues (yellow card) 17'; Brenno (yellow card) 26'; Ruan (yellow card) 47' (yellow-red card) 59'	Stadium: Estadio Defensores del Chaco; Attendance: 0 Referee: Néstor Pitana (Argentina)

14 April Second leg	Grêmio (Brazil)	1–2 (2–4 agg.)	(Ecuador) Independiente del Valle	Porto Alegre, Brazil
19:15 UTC−3	Alisson (yellow card) 9'; Maicon (yellow card) 18' (yellow-red card) 63'; J. Pyerre 22'; Cortez (yellow card) 61'; D. Souza (yellow card) 80'; Kannemann (yellow card) 82'	Report	Pacho (yellow card) 45+1'; Ortiz 45+3', 66'; Hurtado (yellow card) 76'	Stadium: Arena do Grêmio; Attendance: 0 Referee: Patricio Loustau (Argentina)

=== Copa CONMEBOL Sudamericana ===
==== Group stage ====
The draw for the group stage was held on 9 April 2021, 13:00 UTC−03:00, at the CONMEBOL Convention Centre in Luque, Paraguay.

Pos	Team	Pld	W	D	L	GF	GA	GD	Pts	Qualification
1	(Brazil) Grêmio	6	5	1	0	21	5	+16	16	Round of 16
2	(Argentina) Lanús	6	3	1	2	8	6	+2	10	
3	(Colombia) La Equidad	6	2	1	3	6	9	−3	7	
4	(Venezuela) Aragua	6	0	1	5	4	19	−15	1	

Source: CONMEBOL
Rules for classification: 1) Points; 2) Goal difference; 3) Goals scored; 4) Away goals scored; 5) CONMEBOL ranking.

===== Matches =====
22 April 1	Grêmio (Brazil)	2–1	(Colombia) La Equidad	Porto Alegre, Brazil
19:15 UTC−3	Ruan (yellow card) 12'; D. Souza 37'; Rodrigues (red card) 72'; P. Miranda 77'; Ferreira (yellow card) 79'; Bobsin (yellow card) 90+5'	Report	Herazo (yellow card) 6'; Correa (yellow card) 27'; Mena (yellow card) 48'; Mantilla (yellow card) 50'; Duarte 90', (red card) 90+3'	Stadium: Arena do Grêmio; Attendance: 0 Referee: Eber Aquino (Paraguay)

29 April 2	Lanús (Argentina)	1–2	(Brazil) Grêmio	Lanús, Argentina
21:30 UTC−3	F. Pérez (yellow card) 36'; Quignon (yellow card) 56'; Belmonte 69'; Aude (yellow card) 84'	Report	T. Santos (yellow card) 29'; L. Pereira 34', (yellow card) 44'; Ferreira 86'; L. Silva (yellow card) 90+1'	Stadium: Estadio Ciudad de Lanús; Attendance: 0 Referee: Piero Maza (Chile)

6 May 3	Grêmio (Brazil)	8–0	(Venezuela) Aragua	Porto Alegre, Brazil
19:15 UTC−3	L. Fernando 3', 18'; D. Souza 21' (pen.); Ferreira 22', 24'; J. Hernández 28' (o.g.); Maicon 64' (pen.); Churín 77'	Report	Yégüez (yellow card) 20'; Álvarez (yellow card) 56'	Stadium: Arena do Grêmio; Attendance: 0 Referee: Guillermo Guerrero (Ecuador)

13 May 4	Grêmio (Brazil)	3–1	(Argentina) Lanús	Porto Alegre, Brazil
19:15 UTC−3	M. Henrique 3'; Ferreira 22', 78'; Rafinha (yellow card) 36'; Ruan (yellow card) 83'; Geromel (yellow card) 90'	Report	Burdisso 6', (yellow card) 45+1'; Aguirre (yellow card) 66'; Morales (yellow card) 78'; Acosta (yellow card) 90+4'	Stadium: Arena do Grêmio; Attendance: 0 Referee: Daniel Fedorczuk (Uruguay)

20 May 5	Aragua (Venezuela)	2–6	(Brazil) Grêmio	Caracas, Venezuela
21:30 UTC−3	Stephens 48'; Acuña (yellow card) 67'; J. García 89'	Report	Chú 20'; Ricardinho 31'; Vanderson (yellow card) 36'; F. Henrique (yellow card) 47'; Darlan 53'; Pepê 69'; Bobsin (yellow card) 75'; Elias 90+2', 90+3'	Stadium: Estadio Olímpico de la UCV; Attendance: 0 Referee: Mario Díaz de Vivar (Paraguay)

27 May 6	La Equidad (Colombia)	0–0	(Brazil) Grêmio	Ambato, Ecuador (Note: The La Equidad vs. Grêmio match, originally scheduled to be played at the Estadio Metropolitano de Techo, Bogotá, Colombia, took place in at the Estadio Bellavista, Ambato, Ecuador, due to civil unrest in Colombia.)
21:30 UTC−3	Pestaña (yellow card) 18'; Duarte (yellow card) 40' (yellow-red card) 52'; Mena (yellow card) 71'; Correa (red card) 82'	Report	F. Henrique (yellow card) 12'; Bobsin (yellow card) 54'; Emanuel (yellow card) 64'; Rildo (yellow card) 90+3'	Stadium: Estadio Bellavista; Attendance: 0 Referee: Marlon Vera (Ecuador)

==== Final stage ====
The draw for the final stage was held on 1 June 2021, 13:00 UTC−03:00, at the CONMEBOL Convention Centre in Luque, Paraguay.

===== Round of 16 =====
13 July First leg	LDU Quito (Ecuador)	0–1	(Brazil) Grêmio	Quito, Ecuador
19:15 UTC−3	Lucas Piovi (yellow card) 21'; Franklin Guerra (yellow card) 87'	Report	Léo Pereira 19'; Alisson (yellow card) 35'; Fernando Henrique (yellow card) 42'	Stadium: Estadio Rodrigo Paz Delgado; Attendance: 0 Referee: Cristián Garay (Chile)

20 July Second leg	Grêmio (Brazil)	1–2 (2–2a agg.)	(Ecuador) LDU Quito	Porto Alegre, Brazil
19:15 UTC−3	Léo Pereira (yellow card) 21'; Diego Souza 23'; Walter Kannemann (yellow card) 80'	Report	Jordy Alcivar 44', 56' (pen.); Matías Zunino (yellow card) 72'	Stadium: Arena do Grêmio; Attendance: 0 Referee: José Argote Vega (Venezuela)

=== Campeonato Brasileiro Série A ===
==== League table ====
Pos	Team	Pld	W	D	L	GF	GA	GD	Pts	Qualification or relegation
15	Cuiabá	38	10	17	11	34	37	−3	47	Qualification for Copa Sudamericana group stage
16	Juventude	38	11	13	14	36	44	−8	46	
17	Grêmio (R)	38	12	7	19	44	51	−7	43	Relegation to Campeonato Brasileiro Série B
18	Bahia (R)	38	11	10	17	42	51	−9	43	Relegation to Campeonato Brasileiro Série B
19	Sport (R)	38	9	11	18	24	37	−13	38	Relegation to Campeonato Brasileiro Série B

Source: CBF
Rules for classification: 1) points; 2) wins; 3) goal difference; 4) goals scored; 5) head-to-head results (only between two teams); 6) fewest red cards; 7) fewest yellow cards; 8) drawing of lots.
(R) Relegated

==== Results summary ====
Overall								Home						Away					
Pld	W	D	L	GF	GA	GD	Pts	W	D	L	GF	GA	GD	W	D	L	GF	GA	GD
38	12	7	19	44	51	−7	43	8	6	5	29	21	+8	4	1	14	15	30	−15

Source: Soccerway

==== Results by matchday ====
Matchday	1	2	3	4	5	6	7	8	9	10	11	12	13	14	15	16	17	18	19	20	21	22	23	24	25	26	27	28	29	30	31	32	33	34	35	36	37	38
Ground	A	H (Note: Matchday 2 vs. Flamengo postponed due to the call up of players from both teams to the Brazil national team and Brazil national U23 team.)	H	A	A (Note: Matchday 5 vs. Cuiabá, Brazilian Football Confederation postponed the match due to the use of Arena Pantanal for Copa América matches.)	H	H	A	H	A	H	A	H	A	H	A	H	H	A (Note: Matchday 19 vs. Atlético Mineiro, postponed due clubs that have athletes called up for the Brazil national team.)	H	A	A	H	H	A	A	H	A	H	A	H	A	H	A	H	A	A	H
Result	L	D	L	L	W	D	D	L	L	L	D	W	D	L	W	L	W	L	L	W	W	L	L	D	L	L	W	L	L	L	W	L	W	W	W	L	D	W
Position	14	18	19	20	20	20	20	20	20	20	20	19	19	19	19	19	17	18	19	18	17	18	18	17	19	19	19	19	19	19	19	19	19	18	18	18	18	17

Source: CAMPEONATO BRASILEIRO DE FUTEBOL - SÉRIE A - 2022, CBF
A = Away; H = Home; W = Win; D = Draw; L = Loss; P = Postponed

==== Matches ====
The league fixtures were announced on 24 March 2021.

Note: Match numbers indicated on the left hand side are references to the matchday scheduled by the Campeonato Brasileiro Série A and not the order matches were played after postponements and rescheduled matches.

30 May 1	Ceará	3–2	Grêmio	Fortaleza
16:00 UTC−3	Cléber 36'; Rick 42'; Messias (yellow card) 63'; Buiú (yellow card) 86'; Charles (yellow card) 88'; Jorginho 90+4'	Report	Vanderson 45+5'; Ricardinho 49'; T. Santos (yellow card) 57'; Geromel (yellow card) 61'; Robert (yellow card) 90+2'	Stadium: Arena Castelão; Attendance: 0 Referee: Savio Sampaio

13 June 3	Grêmio	0–1	Athletico Paranaense	Porto Alegre
16:00 UTC−3	M. Henrique (yellow card) 34'; T. Santos (yellow card) 60'; Rafinha (yellow card) 65'; Ferreira (yellow card) 90+6'; Maicon (yellow card) 90+7'	Report	Christian (yellow card) 11'; Babi 44', (yellow card) 50'; Richard (yellow card) 87'; Khellven (yellow card) 90+5'	Stadium: Arena do Grêmio; Attendance: 0 Referee: Ricardo Ribeiro

17 June 4	Sport	1–0	Grêmio	Recife
19:00 UTC−3	Sander 34'; André (yellow card) 37'; Iago Maidana (yellow card) 43'; Paulinho Moccelin (yellow card) 45+2'; Gustavo (yellow card) 70'; Santiago Tréllez (yellow card) 75'	Report	M. Henrique (yellow card) 45+2'; Luiz Fernando (yellow card) 48'; Walter Kannemann (yellow card) 50'; Rafinha (yellow card) 54'; Maicon (yellow card) 90+7'	Stadium: Estádio Ilha do Retiro; Attendance: 0 Referee: Denis Serafim

24 June 6	Grêmio	2–2	Santos	Porto Alegre
21:30 UTC−3	Diego Souza 4', (yellow card) 22'; Matheus Henrique 42'; Ferreira (yellow card) 68'	Report	Marcos Guilherme 29'; Camacho (yellow card) 48'; Jean Mota (yellow card) 56'; Marinho 78', (yellow card) 90+6'	Stadium: Arena do Grêmio; Attendance: 0 Referee: Caio Max Augusto Vieira

27 June 7	Grêmio	0–0	Fortaleza	Porto Alegre
20:00 UTC−3	Douglas Costa (yellow card) 37'; Walter Kannemann (red card) 59'; Diogo Barbosa (yellow card) 75'; Diego Souza (penalty missed) 83'	Report	Éderson (yellow card) 28'; Ronald (yellow card) 49'; Yago Pikachu (penalty missed) 63'; Titi (yellow card) 90+2'; Osvaldo (yellow card) 90+2'	Stadium: Arena do Grêmio; Attendance: 0 Referee: Marcelo de Lima Henrique

30 June 8	Juventude	2–0	Grêmio	Caxias do Sul
21:30 UTC−3	Paulinho Bóia 28'; Elton (yellow card) 71'; Chico (yellow card) 82'; Matheus Peixoto 28'; Vitor Mendes (yellow card) 90+3'	Report		Stadium: Estádio Alfredo Jaconi; Attendance: 0 Referee: Vinícius Gonçalves Dias Araújo

4 July 9	Grêmio	0–1	Atlético Goianiense	Porto Alegre
20:30 UTC−3	Victor Bobsin (yellow card) 20'; Walter Kannemann (yellow card) 89'; Vanderson (yellow card) 90+3'	Report	Lucão 55'	Stadium: Arena do Grêmio; Attendance: 0 Referee: Marielson Alves Silva

7 July 10	Palmeiras	2–0	Grêmio	São Paulo
19:00 UTC−3	Raphael Veiga 1'; Gabriel Menino (yellow card) 9', (goal) 17'; Danilo (yellow card) 41'	Report	Matheus Henrique (yellow card) 34'; Vanderson (yellow card) 38'	Stadium: Allianz Parque; Attendance: 0 Referee: Felipe Fernandes de Lima

10 July 11	Grêmio	0–0	Internacional	Porto Alegre
16:30 UTC−3	Victor Bobsin (yellow card) 44'	Report	Bruno Méndez (yellow card) 38'; Rodrigo Dourado (yellow card) 41'	Stadium: Arena do Grêmio; Attendance: 0 Referee: Flávio Rodrigues de Souza

17 July 12	Fluminense	0–1	Grêmio	Rio de Janeiro
21:00 UTC−3	Lucca (yellow card) 77'	Report	Fernando Henrique (yellow card) 42'; Walter Kannemann (yellow card) 46'; César Pinares 90' (pen.); Jean Pyerre (yellow card) 90'; Diego Souza (yellow card) 90'	Stadium: Maracanã; Attendance: 0 Referee: Paulo Roberto Alves Júnior

24 July 13	Grêmio	1–1	América Mineiro	Porto Alegre
17:00 UTC−3	Guilherme Guedes 7'; Fernando Henrique (yellow card) 63'; Darlan (yellow card) 90+4'; Rafinha (yellow card) 90+5'	Report	Felipe Azevedo 31'; Fernando Henrique (yellow card) 63'; Zé Vitor (yellow card) 32'; Alan Ruschel (yellow card) 74'; Ramon (yellow card) 85'	Stadium: Arena do Grêmio; Attendance: 0 Referee: Alisson Furtado

31 July 14	Red Bull Bragantino	1–0	Grêmio	Bragança Paulista
21:00 UTC−3	Bruno Praxedes 62'; Jadsom Silva (yellow card) 90+6'	Report	Pedro Geromel (yellow card) 38'; Bruno Cortez (yellow card) 72'	Stadium: Nabi Abi Chedid; Attendance: 0 Referee: Ricardo Marques Ribeiro

9 August 15	Grêmio	2–1	Chapecoense	Porto Alegre
20:00 UTC−3	Alisson 18'; Miguel Borja 32' (pen.); Darlan (yellow card) 63'	Report	Anselmo Ramon 4', (yellow card) 23'; Derlan (yellow card) 31'; Denner (yellow card) 45+2'	Stadium: Arena do Grêmio; Attendance: 0 Referee: Marcelo de Lima Henrique

14 August 16	São Paulo	2–1	Grêmio	São Paulo
21:00 UTC−3	Vitor Bueno 13'; Bruno Alves (yellow card) 21'; Igor Gomes (yellow card) 61', (goal) 90+3'	Report	Geromel (yellow card) 12'; Vanderson 20'	Stadium: Morumbi; Attendance: 0 Referee: Bráulio da Silva Machado

18 August 5	Cuiabá	0–1	Grêmio	Cuiabá
19:00 UTC−3	João Lucas (yellow card) 45+7'	Report	Miguel Borja 25' (pen.); Thiago Santos (yellow card) 45'; Rafinha (yellow card) 69'; Ruan (yellow card) 72'; Jean Pyerre (yellow card) 90+2'	Stadium: Arena Pantanal; Attendance: 0 Referee: Léo Simão

21 August 17	Grêmio	2–0	Bahia	Porto Alegre
19:00 UTC−3	Miguel Borja 49'; Lucas Silva (yellow card) 87'; Diego Souza 90+5'	Report	Gilberto (yellow card) 67'	Stadium: Arena do Grêmio; Attendance: 0 Referee: Caio Max Augusto Vieira

28 August 18	Grêmio	0–1	Corinthians	Porto Alegre
21:00 UTC−3	Maicon (yellow card) 80', (red card) 80'	Report	Jô 79'; Cássio (yellow card) 89'; João Victor (yellow card) 90+2'	Stadium: Arena do Grêmio; Attendance: 0 Referee: Ricardo Marques Ribeiro

12 September 20	Grêmio	2–0	Ceará	Porto Alegre
11:00 UTC−3	Diego Souza 43'; Ferreira 45+1'	Report		Stadium: Arena do Grêmio; Attendance: 0 Referee: Flávio Rodrigues de Sozua

19 September 21	Flamengo	0–1	Grêmio	Rio de Janeiro
20:30 UTC−3	Mauricio Isla (yellow card) 62'; Bruno Henrique (yellow card) 84'; Rodrigo Caio (yellow card) 90+3'	Report	Miguel Borja (yellow card) 41', (goal) 45+3', (penalty missed) 90+9'; Thiago Santos (yellow card) 47'; Vanderson (yellow card) 70'; Sarará (yellow card) 85'	Stadium: Maracanã; Attendance: 0 Referee: Marielson Alves Silva

26 September 22	Athletico Paranaense	4–2	Grêmio	Curitiba
18:15 UTC−3	Pedro Rocha 31', 45+1'; Renato Kayzer 55', 61'; Zé Ivaldo (yellow card) 67'	Report	Thiago Santos 59'; Ruan (yellow card) 65'; Miguel Borja (yellow card) 66'; Vanderson 84'	Stadium: Arena da Baixada; Attendance: 0 Referee: Luiz Flávio de Oliveira

3 October 23	Grêmio	1–2	Sport	Porto Alegre
20:30 UTC−3	Rodrigues (yellow card) 72'; Douglas Costa 85'; Mathías Villasanti (yellow card) 90+5'	Report	Gustavo 53'; Mikael 70'; Everaldo (yellow card) 72'	Stadium: Arena do Grêmio; Attendance: 7,147; Referee: Felipe Fernandes de Lima

6 October 24	Grêmio	2–2	Cuiabá	Porto Alegre
21:30 UTC−3	Thiago Santos (yellow card) 13'; Alisson 52', 82'; Diego Churín (yellow card) 86'	Report	Alan Empereur (yellow card) 21'; Max 23'; Marllon 79'; Lucas Ramon (yellow card) 88'	Stadium: Arena do Grêmio; Attendance: 4,931; Referee: Wilton Pereira Sampaio

10 October 25	Santos	1–0	Grêmio	Santos
16:00 UTC−3	Léo Baptistão (yellow card) 45+1'; Wagner Leonardo 90+2'; Felipe Jonatan (yellow card) 90+3'; Carlos Sánchez (yellow card) 90+6'; Diego Tardelli (yellow card) 90+6'	Report	Rodrigues (yellow card) 9'; Thiago Santos (yellow card) 32'; Douglas Costa (yellow card) 45+2'; Walter Kannemann (yellow card) 47'; Lucas Silva (yellow card) 67'; Rafinha (yellow card) 72' (yellow-red card) 90+8'	Stadium: Vila Belmiro; Referee: Bruno Arleu de Araújo

13 October 26	Fortaleza	1–0	Grêmio	Fortaleza
20:30 UTC−3	Robson (yellow card) 45+3'; Yago Pikachu 79'	Report	Ruan (yellow card) 81'; Éverton (yellow card) 90+4'	Stadium: Arena Castelão; Referee: Vinícius Gonçalves Dias Araújo

16 October 27	Grêmio	3–2	Juventude	Porto Alegre
18:15 UTC−3	Douglas Costa 23'; Diego Souza 25'; Mathías Villasanti 56'; Lucas Silva (yellow card) 86'	Report	Guilherme Castilho (yellow card) 42'; Sorriso 59'; Roberson (yellow card) 79'; Guilherme Santos (yellow card) 89'; Capixaba 90+4'	Stadium: Arena do Grêmio; Referee: Marcelo de Lima Henrique

25 October 28	Atlético Goianiense	2–0	Grêmio	Goiânia
20:00 UTC−3	Igor Cariús 44'; André Luis (yellow card) 69'; Marlon Freitas 72' (pen.); Willian Maranhão (yellow card) 90'	Report	Walter Kannemann (yellow card) 24'; Paulo Miranda (yellow card) 29', (red card) 69'; Thiago Santos (yellow card) 41'; Ferreira (yellow card) 65'; Rafinha (yellow card) 69'; Luiz Fernando (yellow card) 76'; Miguel Borja (yellow card) 90'	Stadium: Estádio Antônio Accioly; Referee: Caio Max Augusto Vieira

31 October 29	Grêmio	1–3	Palmeiras	Porto Alegre
16:00 UTC−3	Diego Souza 12'; Walter Kannemann (yellow card) 27'; Jean Pyerre (yellow card) 39'; Thiago Santos (yellow card) 64'; Alisson (yellow card) 69'	Report	Raphael Veiga 45+1' (pen.), 45+5'; Felipe Melo (yellow card) 62'; Luan (yellow card) 90+1'; Breno Lopes 90+4'	Stadium: Arena do Grêmio; Attendance: 14,207; Referee: Sávio Pereira Sampaio

3 November 19	Atlético Mineiro	2–1	Grêmio	Belo Horizonte
21:00 UTC−3	Matías Zaracho 12', (yellow card) 45+3'; Tchê Tchê (yellow card) 50'; Nacho Fernández (yellow card) 53'; Eduardo Vargas 75' (pen.); Mariano (yellow card) 78'; Allan (yellow card) 90+2'	Report	Lucas Silva (yellow card) 36'; Miguel Borja (yellow card) 38'; Jaminton Campaz 56', (yellow card) 73'; Pedro Geromel (yellow card) 58'; Douglas Costa (yellow card) 81'; Rafinha (yellow card) 90+5'	Stadium: Mineirão; Attendance: 56,624; Referee: Luiz Flávio de Oliveira

6 November 30	Internacional	1–0	Grêmio	Porto Alegre
19:00 UTC−3	Renzo Saravia (yellow card) 24'; Taison 40'; Patrick (red card) 90+5'	Report	Mathías Villasanti (yellow card) 22'; Pedro Geromel (yellow card) 29'; Thiago Santos (yellow card) 75'; Bruno Cortez (red card) 90+5'	Stadium: Beira-Rio; Attendance: 25,971; Referee: Marcelo de Lima Henrique

9 November 31	Grêmio	1–0	Fluminense	Porto Alegre
21:30 UTC−3	Diego Souza 62'; Lucas Silva (yellow card) 75'; Douglas Costa (yellow card) 90+3'; Walter Kannemann (yellow card) 90+4'	Report	Nino (yellow card) 45'	Stadium: Arena do Grêmio; Attendance: 0 Referee: Vinícius Gonçalves Dias Araújo

13 November 32	América Mineiro	3–1	Grêmio	Belo Horizonte
18:30 UTC−3	Felipe Azevedo 4'; Ricardo Silva (yellow card) 32'; Matheus Cavichioli (yellow card) 35'; Ademir 45+4' (pen.); Mauro Zárate (yellow card) 45+5'; Juninho 47'	Report	Ruan (yellow card) 37'; Ferreira 55'	Stadium: Estádio Independência; Referee: Flávio Rodrigues de Souza

16 November 33	Grêmio	3–0	Red Bull Bragantino	Porto Alegre
18:30 UTC−3	Diego Souza 5'; Lucas Silva 32'; Jhonata Robert 35'	Report	Júlio César (yellow card) 34'; Natan (yellow card) 90+4'	Stadium: Arena do Grêmio; Attendance: 0 Referee: Caio Max Augusto Vieira

20 November 34	Chapecoense	1–3	Grêmio	Chapecó
19:00 UTC−3	Anderson Leite (yellow card) 26'; Bruno Cortez 76' (o.g.)	Report	Lucas Silva 36'; Thiago Santos 60'; Laércio 80' (o.g.); Bruno Cortez (yellow card) 82'	Stadium: Arena Condá; Attendance: 2,830; Referee: Rodolpho Toski Marques

23 November 2	Grêmio	2–2	Flamengo	Porto Alegre
21:00 UTC−3	Jhonata Robert (yellow card) 51' (yellow-red card) 60'; Lucas Silva (yellow card) 57'; Jaminton Campaz (yellow card) 72'; Miguel Borja 75'; Brenno (red card) 78'; Ferreira 82'	Report	Vitinho 58', 74'; Renê (yellow card) 71'; Kenedy (yellow card) 81'	Stadium: Arena do Grêmio; Attendance: 0 Referee: Bráulio da Silva Machado

26 November 36	Bahia	3–1	Grêmio	Salvador
19:00 UTC−3	Matheus Bahia 13'; Raí 18'; Rodriguinho (yellow card) 32'; Nino Paraíba (yellow card) 45+1'; Lucas Mugni (yellow card) 70'; Daniel 85'	Report	Vanderson (yellow card) 36'; Bruno Cortez (yellow card) 47'; Thiago Santos 61'; Walter Kannemann (yellow card) 73'	Stadium: Arena Fonte Nova; Attendance: 30,071; Referee: Bruno Arleu de Araújo

2 December 35	Grêmio	3–0	São Paulo	Porto Alegre
20:00 UTC−3	Thiago Santos 23'; Diogo Barbosa 68'; Douglas Costa (yellow card) 74'; Gabriel Grando (yellow card) 85'; Miguel Borja (yellow card) 90+3'; Jhonata Robert 90+4'	Report	Emiliano Rigoni (yellow card) 60'; Miranda (yellow card) 90+1'	Stadium: Arena do Grêmio; Attendance: 44,187; Referee: Sávio Pereira Sampaio

5 December 37	Corinthians	1–1	Grêmio	São Paulo
16:00 UTC−3	Róger Guedes (yellow card) 45+1'; Renato Augusto 86'	Report	Walter Kannemann (yellow card) 11'; Rafinha (yellow card) 15'; Diego Souza 39'; Pedro Geromel (yellow card) 45+1'	Stadium: Neo Química Arena; Attendance: 44,187; Referee: Bruno Arleu de Araújo

9 December 38	Grêmio	4–3	Atlético Mineiro	Porto Alegre
21:30 UTC−3	Diego Souza 6', 20'; Jaminton Campaz 11'; Douglas Costa (yellow card) 42', (goal) 59'; Thiago Santos (yellow card) 37'; Diogo Barbosa (yellow card) 70'; Miguel Borja (penalty missed) 86'	Report	Dodô 26'; Eduardo Vargas 35'; Dylan Borrero (yellow card) 62'; Hyoran 90+1'	Stadium: Arena do Grêmio; Attendance: 33,577; Referee: Raphael Claus

=== Copa do Brasil ===
==== Third round ====
The draw for the third round was held on 23 April 2021, 14:00 UTC−03:00, at the CBF headquarters in Rio de Janeiro.

2 June First leg	Grêmio	2–0	Brasiliense	Porto Alegre
16:30 UTC−3	Ricardinho 44'; Jean Pyerre 49', (yellow card) 81'; Vanderson (yellow card) 64'; L. Silva (yellow card) 82'	Report	Badhuga (yellow card) 17'; Gorduxo (yellow card) 43'; Zé Love (yellow card) 67'; Lídio (yellow card) 85'	Stadium: Arena do Grêmio; Attendance: 0 Referee: Alexandre Jesus

10 June Second leg	Brasiliense	0–0 (0–2 agg.)	Grêmio	Taguatinga
15:30 UTC−3	Peu (yellow card) 34'; Lídio (yellow card) 45+6'; Diogo (yellow card) 60'; Luquinhas (yellow card) 69'; Zé Love (yellow card) 74'; Zotti (yellow card) 76' (yellow-red card) 76'	Report	Geromel (yellow card) 45+1'; P. Victor (yellow card) 73'	Stadium: Estádio Boca do Jacaré; Attendance: 0 Referee: Wanderson Souza

===== Round of 16 =====
The draw for the round of 16 was held on 22 June 2021, 16:00 UTC−03:00, at the CBF headquarters in Rio de Janeiro.

27 July First leg	Vitória	0–3	Grêmio	Salvador
21:30 UTC−3	Dudu (yellow card) 15'; Pedrinho (yellow card) 51'	Report	Ricardinho 31'; Léo Pereira 54'; Diogo Barbosa 90+3'	Stadium: Barradão; Attendance: 0 Referee: Flávio Rodrigues de Souza

3 August Second leg	Grêmio	1–0 (4–0 agg.)	Vitória	Porto Alegre
19:00 UTC−3	Ruan (yellow card) 23'; Jean Pyerre 45+2' (pen.)	Report	João Pedro (red card) 44'	Stadium: Arena do Grêmio; Attendance: 0 Referee: Léo Simão Holanda

===== Quarter-finals =====
The draw for quarter-finals was held on 6 August 2021, 15:00 UTC-03:00, at the CBF headquarters in Rio de Janeiro.

25 August First leg	Grêmio	0–4	Flamengo	Porto Alegre
21:30 UTC−3	Lucas Silva (yellow card) 45+2'; Ferreira (yellow card) 52'; Vanderson (red card) 90+3'; Luiz Fernando (yellow card) 90+6'	Report	Diego (yellow card) 29'; Mauricio Isla (yellow card) 33' (yellow-red card) 45'; Bruno Viana 53'; Michael 85'; Rodinei 90+1'; Gabriel Barbosa (yellow card) 90+4'; Vitinho 90+7' (pen.)	Stadium: Arena do Grêmio; Attendance: 0 Referee: Vinícius Gonçalves Dias Araújo

15 September Second leg	Flamengo	2–0 (6–0 agg.)	Grêmio	Rio de Janeiro
21:30 UTC−3	Walter Kannemann (yellow card) 14'; Brenno (yellow card) 23'; Rafinha (yellow card) 44'; Miguel Borja (yellow card) 45+6'; Rodrigues (yellow card) 77'	Report	Thiago Maia (yellow card) 45+3'; Renê (yellow card) 45+6'; Pedro 79' (pen.), 87'	Stadium: Maracanã; Attendance: 6,446; Referee: Rodolpho Toski Marques
