= Felipe Albuquerque =

Brazilian footballer (born 1999)

Personal information
- Full name: Felipe Albuquerque Felippi
- Date of birth: 27 September 1999 (age 27)
- Place of birth: Nova Andradina, Brazil
- Height: 1.74 m (5 ft 9 in)
- Position: Right-back

Team information
- Current team: Caxias
- Number: 17

Youth career
- 2014–2017: Grêmio

Senior career*
Years	Team	Apps	(Gls)
2017–2022	Grêmio	9	(0)
2020–2021	→ Brasil de Pelotas (loan)	24	(0)
2021	→ Ponte Preta (loan)	37	(1)
2022	→ Novorizontino (loan)	17	(0)
2023	Chapecoense	31	(2)
2024	Inter de Limeira	9	(0)
2024	ABC FC	15	(0)
2025	Inter de Limeira	10	(0)
2025	CSA	12	(0)
2026	Grêmio Barueri	14	(2)
2026–	Caxias	17	(0)
- * Club domestic league appearances and goals as of 10 November 2026

Felipe Albuquerque Felippi (born 27 September 1999), commonly known as Felipe Albuquerque, is a Brazilian professional footballer who plays as a right-back for Campeonato Brasileiro Série C club Caxias].

== Club career ==
=== Grêmio ===
Born in Nova Andradina, Mato Grosso do Sul, Felipe Albuquerque joined the Grêmio's Academy at the age of 14 in 2014.

== Career statistics ==
=== Club ===
As of 25 November 2021.

Appearances and goals by club, season and competition
Club	Season	League			State League		National Cup		Continental		Other		Total	
Club	Season	Division	Apps	Goals	Apps	Goals	Apps	Goals	Apps	Goals	Apps	Goals	Apps	Goals
Grêmio	2017	Série A	1	0	—		—		—		—		1	0
Grêmio	2018	Série A	0	0	—		—		—		—		0	0
Grêmio	2019	Série A	1	0	—		—		—		—		1	0
Grêmio	2020	Série A	—		—		—		—		—		0	0
Grêmio	2021	Série A	0	0	2 (Note: Appearance(s) in Campeonato Gaúcho.)	0	0	0	2 (Note: Appearance(s) in Copa Libertadores.)	0	—		4	0
Grêmio	Total		2	0	2	0	0	0	2	0	—		6	0
Brasil de Pelotas (loan)	2020	Série B	24	0	—		—		—		—		24	0
Ponte Preta (loan)	2021	Série B	30	1	6 (Note: Appearance(s) in Campeonato Paulista.)	0	—		—		—		36	1
Career total			56	1	8	0	0	0	2	0	0	0	66	1

== Honours ==
Grêmio

- Copa CONMEBOL Libertadores: 2017
- CONMEBOL Recopa Sudamericana: 2018
- Campeonato Gaúcho: 2018, 2019, 2020, 2022
