= Emanuel (footballer) =

Brazilian footballer (born 1999)

Personal information
- Full name: Emanuel Leone Moura
- Date of birth: 1 November 1999 (age 27)
- Place of birth: São Paulo, Brazil
- Height: 1.85 m (6 ft 1 in)
- Position: Centre-back

Youth career
- 2016: Desportivo Brasil
- 2016: → Grêmio (loan)
- 2016–2020: Grêmio

Senior career*
Years	Team	Apps	(Gls)
2017–2022	Grêmio	4	(0)
2022	→ Inter de Limeira (loan)	0	(0)
2022	→ São José (loan)	1	(0)
2022–2024	Spartak Varna	8	(0)
2024	Capivariano	7	(0)

International career^{‡}
2016	Brazil U18		
- * Club domestic league appearances and goals as of 10:33, 8 February 2025 (UTC) ‡ National team caps and goals as of 20 March 2021

Emanuel Leone Moura (born 1 November 1999), commonly known as Emanuel, is a Brazilian professional footballer who plays as a centre-back.

== Club career ==
=== Grêmio ===
Born in São Paulo, Emanuel joined the Grêmio's Academy at the age of 16 in 2016.

=== Spartak Varna ===
On 20 June 2022 Emanuel Moura joined the newly promoted to the Bulgarian First League team Spartak Varna, signing a 3-years long contract deal. He made his league debut for the team on 16 September 2022, ina match against Botev Plovdiv helping the team to secure their first win for the season.

== Career statistics ==
=== Club ===
As of 25 November 2021.

Appearances and goals by club, season and competition
Club	Season	League			State League		National Cup		Continental		Other		Total	
Club	Season	Division	Apps	Goals	Apps	Goals	Apps	Goals	Apps	Goals	Apps	Goals	Apps	Goals
Grêmio	2017	Série A	1	0	—		—		—		—		1	0
Grêmio	2018	Série A	0	0	—		—		—		—		0	0
Grêmio	2019	Série A	1	0	—		—		—		—		1	0
Grêmio	2020	Série A	0	0	—		—		0	0	—		0	0
Grêmio	2021	Série A	0	0	2 (Note: Appearance(s) in Campeonato Gaúcho.)	0	0	0	1 (Note: Appearance(s) in Copa Sudamericana.)	0	—		3	0
Career total			2	0	2	0	0	0	1	0	0	0	5	0

=== International ===
As of 20 March 2021.

National team	Year	Competitive		Friendly		Total	
National team	Year	Apps	Goals	Apps	Goals	Apps	Goals
Brazil U18	2016	—		—		0	0
Brazil U18	Total	0	0	0	0	0	0
Total		0	0	0	0	0	0

== Honours ==
Grêmio

- Copa CONMEBOL Libertadores: 2017
- CONMEBOL Recopa Sudamericana: 2018
- Campeonato Gaúcho: 2018, 2019, 2020, 2021
- Recopa Gaúcha: 2019, 2021
