= Matheus Henrique =

Brazilian footballer (born 1997)

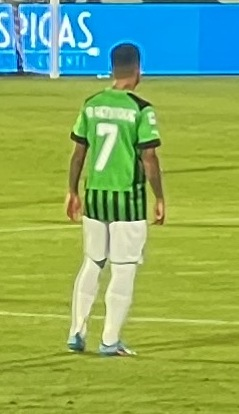
- Henrique playing for Sassuolo in 2022

Personal information
- Full name: Matheus Henrique de Souza
- Date of birth: 19 December 1997 (age 28)
- Place of birth: São Paulo, Brazil
- Height: 1.73 m (5 ft 8 in)
- Position: Central midfielder

Team information
- Current team: Cruzeiro
- Number: 7

Youth career
- –2013: Nacional-SP
- 2013–2014: Grêmio
- 2015–2018: São Caetano
- 2017–2018: → Grêmio (loan)

Senior career*
Years	Team	Apps	(Gls)
2015–2018	São Caetano	20	(3)
2017–2018	→ Grêmio (loan)	17	(4)
2019–2022	Grêmio	85	(5)
2021–2022	→ Sassuolo (loan)	25	(0)
2022–2024	Sassuolo	61	(6)
2024–	Cruzeiro	59	(3)

International career^{‡}
2019–2021	Brazil U23	19	(1)
2019	Brazil	1	(0)
Medal record
Men's football
Representing Brazil
Olympic Games
Gold medal – first place	2020 Tokyo	Team
- * Club domestic league appearances and goals as of 9 April 2026 ‡ National team caps and goals as of 16:00, 24 January 2022 (UTC)

Matheus Henrique de Souza (born 19 December 1997) is a Brazilian professional footballer who plays as a central midfielder for Cruzeiro. He also represented the Brazil national team in one friendly in 2019.

== Club career ==
On 11 August 2021, Matheus Henrique joined Italian Serie A club Sassuolo on a season-long loan from Grêmio, with an obligation to buy.

== International career ==
Matheus Henrique made his senior debut for Brazil in an October 2019 friendly against Senegal. Previously, he was part of the Brazil under-23 team that won the 2019 Toulon Tournament, beating Japan on penalties in the final. Courtesy of his Grêmio performances, he became a mainstay of the under-23 team preparing to compete at the Tokyo Olympics. He participated in the International Tenerife Tournament in 2019 and the CONMEBOL Pre-Olympic Tournament in 2020 with the under-23 team, finishing runner-up in both competitions and securing a place at the Olympics with their performance in the latter.

On 17 June 2021, Matheus Henrique was named in the Brazil squad for the 2020 Summer Olympics.

== Career statistics ==
=== Club ===
As of match played 19 May 2024

Appearances and goals by club, season and competition
Club	Season	League			State League		Cup		Continental		Other		Total	
Club	Season	Division	Apps	Goals	Apps	Goals	Apps	Goals	Apps	Goals	Apps	Goals	Apps	Goals
São Caetano	2015	Série D	0	0	2	1	0	0	–		0	0	2	1
São Caetano	2016	Paulista A2	–		18	2	0	0	–		8 (Note: Appearances in Copa Paulista)	0	26	2
São Caetano	Total		0	0	20	3	0	0	0	0	8	0	28	3
Grêmio (loan)	2017	Série A	1	0	0	0	0	0	–		–		1	0
Grêmio (loan)	2018	Série A	12	2	4	2	0	0	1 (Note: Appearances in Copa Libertadores)	0	0	0	17	4
Grêmio	2019	Série A	20	0	12	1	5	0	9	0	–		46	1
Grêmio	2020	Série A	29	2	8	0	8	0	8	1	–		53	3
Grêmio	2021	Série A	8	1	8	1	0	0	6 (Note: Three appearances in Copa Libertadores, three appearances and one goal in Copa Sudamericana)	1	–		22	3
Grêmio	Total		70	5	32	4	13	0	24	2	0	0	139	11
Sassuolo	2021–22	Serie A	25	0	–		1	0	–		–		26	0
Sassuolo	2022–23	Serie A	30	4	–		1	0	–		–		31	4
Sassuolo	2023–24	Serie A	31	2	–		1	0	–		–		32	2
Sassuolo	Total		86	6	0	0	3	0	0	0	0	0	89	6
Career total			156	11	52	7	16	0	24	2	8	0	256	20

=== International ===
As of matches played 6 November 2019

Appearances and goals by national team and year
National team	Year	Apps	Goals
Brazil	2019	1	0
Total		1	0

== Honours ==
Grêmio

- Campeonato Gaúcho: 2018, 2019, 2020, 2021

Brazil U23

- Summer Olympics: 2020
- Toulon Tournament: 2019
