= Brenno (footballer) =

Brazilian footballer (born 1999)

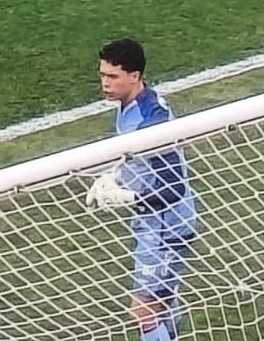
- Brenno playing for Fortaleza in 2025

Personal information
- Full name: Brenno Oliveira Fraga Costa
- Date of birth: 1 April 1999 (age 27)
- Place of birth: Sorocaba, Brazil
- Height: 1.88 m (6 ft 2 in)
- Position: Goalkeeper

Team information
- Current team: Sport Recife
- Number: 21

Youth career
- 2013–2017: Desportivo Brasil
- 2016–2017: → Grêmio (loan)

Senior career*
Years	Team	Apps	(Gls)
2017–2024	Grêmio	71	(0)
2023–2024	→ Bari (loan)	33	(0)
2025–2026	Fortaleza	31	(0)
2026–	Sport Recife	0	(0)

International career^{‡}
2021–	Brazil U23	1	(0)
Medal record
Men's football
Representing Brazil
Olympic Games
Gold medal – first place	2020 Tokyo	Team
- * Club domestic league appearances and goals as of 15 April 2026 ‡ National team caps and goals as of 14:54, 7 August 2021 (UTC)

Brenno Oliveira Fraga Costa (born 1 April 1999), simply known as Brenno, is a Brazilian professional footballer who plays as a goalkeeper for Campeonato Brasileiro Série B club Sport Recife.

== Club career ==
A youth product of Desportivo Brasil, Brenno signed with Grêmio in 2017. Brenno made his professional debut with Grêmio in a 1–0 Campeonato Gaúcho win over Internacional on 17 March 2019.

On 13 August 2023, Brenno joined Bari in Italy on loan with an option to buy.

== International career ==
On 17 June 2021, Brenno was named in the Brazil squad for the 2020 Summer Olympics.

== Career statistics ==
As of Match played 26 May 2025

Appearances and goals by club, season and competition
Club	Season	League			State League		National Cup		Continental		Other		Total	
Club	Season	Division	Apps	Goals	Apps	Goals	Apps	Goals	Apps	Goals	Apps	Goals	Apps	Goals
Grêmio	2017	Série A	0	0	0	0	0	0	0	0	—		0	0
Grêmio	2018	Série A	0	0	0	0	0	0	0	0	—		0	0
Grêmio	2019	Série A	0	0	2 (Note: Appearance(s) in Campeonato Gaúcho)	0	0	0	0	0	—		2	0
Grêmio	2020	Série A	0	0	0	0	0	0	0	0	—		0	0
Grêmio	2021	Série A	14	0	14	0	1	0	7 (Note: Three appearances in Copa Libertadores, Four appearances in Copa Sudamericana)	0	—		36	0
Grêmio	2022	Série B	24	0	10	0	1	0	—		—		35	0
Grêmio	2023	Série A	1	0	6	0	0	0	—		—		7	0
Grêmio	2024	Série A	0	0	0	0	0	0	0	0	—		0	0
Grêmio	Total		39	0	32	0	2	0	7	0	—		80	0
Bari (loan)	2023-24	Serie B	33	0	—		0	0	—		0	0	33	0
Fortaleza	2025	Série A	0	0	2 (Note: Appearance(s) in Campeonato Cearense)	0	0	0	0	0	2 (Note: Appearance(s) in Copa do Nordeste)	0	4	0
Career total			72	0	34	0	2	0	7	0	2	0	117	0

== Honours ==
=== Club ===
Grêmio

- Recopa Sudamericana: 2018
- Campeonato Gaúcho: 2018, 2019, 2020, 2021, 2022, 2023
- Recopa Gaúcha: 2019, 2021, 2022, 2023

Fortaleza

- Campeonato Cearense: 2026

=== International ===
Brazil Olympic

- Summer Olympics: 2020
