= Paulo Miranda (footballer, born 1988) =

Brazilian footballer

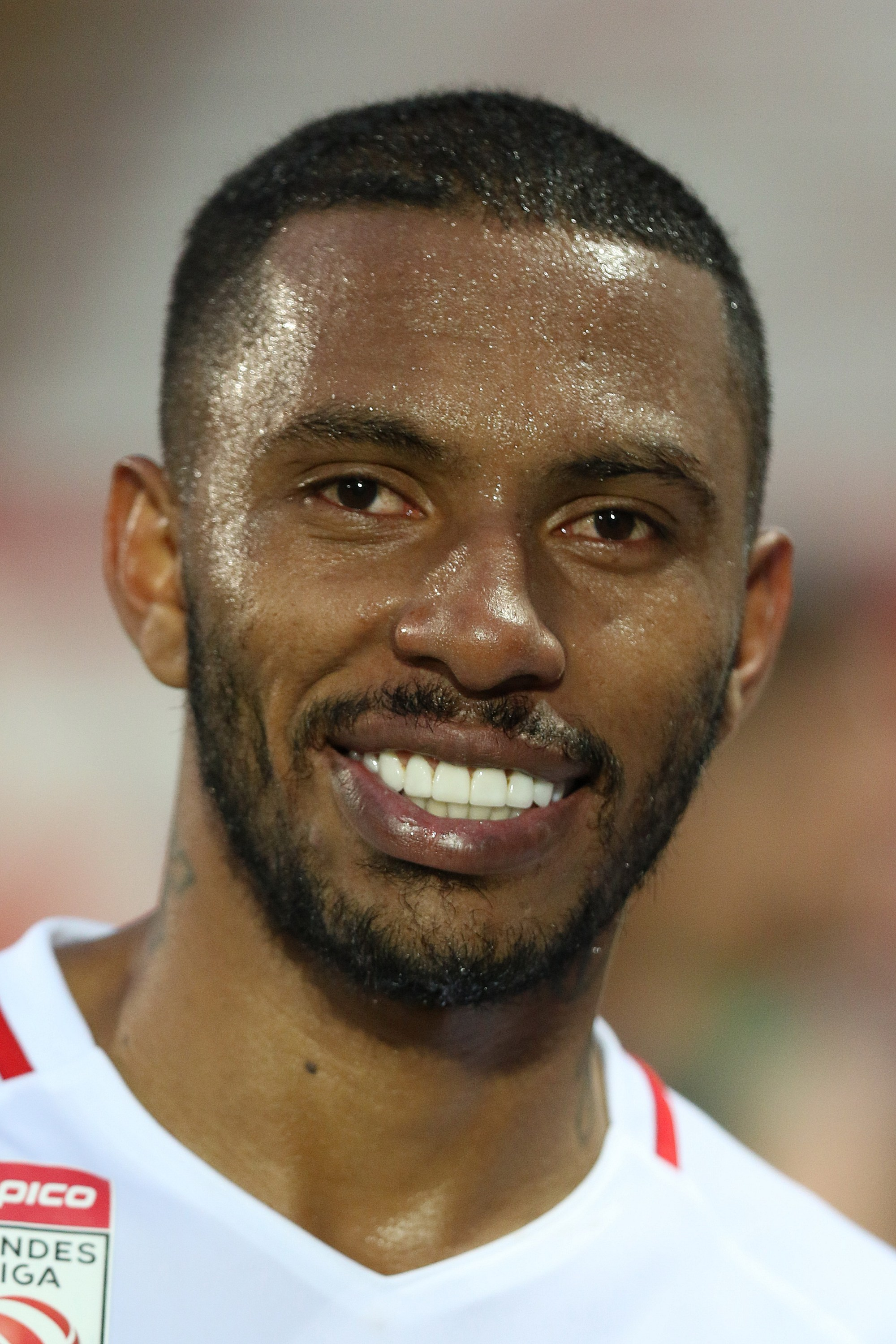
- Paulo Miranda in 2017

Personal information
- Full name: Jonathan Doin
- Date of birth: 16 August 1988 (age 38)
- Place of birth: Castro, Brazil
- Height: 1.85 m (6 ft 1 in)
- Position: Defender

Youth career
- 2007–2008: Iraty
- 2008: Desportivo Brasil

Senior career*
Years	Team	Apps	(Gls)
2008–2011	Desportivo Brasil	0	(0)
2008–2009	→ Palmeiras (loan)	2	(0)
2010–2011	→ Oeste (loan)	41	(1)
2011	→ Bahia (loan)	32	(1)
2012–2015	São Paulo	100	(4)
2015–2017	Red Bull Salzburg	67	(4)
2018–2022	Grêmio	71	(5)
2022	→ Juventude (loan)	26	(0)
2023	Náutico	5	(0)
2025	Mixto	1	(0)
- * Club domestic league appearances and goals as of 3 September 2025

Jonathan Doin (born 16 August 1988), known as Paulo Miranda, is a Brazilian professional footballer who last played for Náutico. Mainly a central defender, he can perform equally as a right-back.

He is nicknamed after fellow footballer Paulo Miranda when playing for Iraty, after a coach said that his name "was not suited for a defender".

Paulo Miranda had his contract with Náutico rescinded on 24 May 2023, after having his name included in the 2023 Brazilian football match-fixing scandal. Eight days later, he received a 1,000-day ban from football, aside from being charged a R$ 70,000 fine.

After the suspension ended, he returned to professional action for Mixto, in the 2025 Campeonato Brasileiro Série D, in a match against Portuguesa.

== Honours ==
São Paulo

- Copa Sudamericana: 2012

Grêmio

- Recopa Sudamericana: 2018
- Campeonato Gaúcho: 2018, 2019, 2020, 2021
- Recopa Gaúcha: 2019, 2021
