= Bruno Cortez =

Brazilian footballer (born 1987)

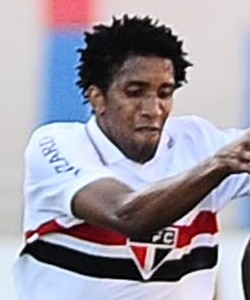
- Cortes with São Paulo in 2012

Personal information
- Full name: Bruno Cortês Barbosa
- Date of birth: 11 March 1987 (age 39)
- Place of birth: Rio de Janeiro, Brazil
- Height: 1.81 m (5 ft 11 in)
- Position: Left back

Team information
- Current team: Sampaio Corrêa Futebol Clube
- Number: 31

Senior career*
Years	Team	Apps	(Gls)
2007	Arturzinho	0	(0)
2007	→ Paysandu (loan)	1	(0)
2007	Al-Shahaniya		
2008	Castelo Branco	18	(1)
2009–2010	Quissamã	24	(0)
2011	Nova Iguaçu	14	(0)
2011	Botafogo	28	(0)
2012–2016	São Paulo	56	(1)
2013	→ Benfica (loan)	6	(0)
2014	→ Criciúma (loan)	21	(0)
2015–2016	→ Albirex Niigata (loan)	53	(1)
2017–2021	Grêmio	156	(2)
2022	Avaí	33	(0)
2023	Mirassol	2	(0)
2023	Avaí	18	(0)
2024	Sampaio Corrêa	19	(0)
Total		459	(6)

International career^{‡}
	Brazil	1	(0)
- * Club domestic league appearances and goals as of 21:00, 24 November 2021 (UTC) ‡ National team caps and goals as of 29 September 2011

Bruno Cortês Barbosa (born 11 March 1987), known as Bruno Cortez, is a Brazilian professional footballer who plays as a left back.

Cortez changed his surname spelling from Cortês to Cortez, without circumflex diacritic and with a final z ending after being asked to do so by the Nova Iguaçu club president. After leaving his youth club, Cortez decided to keep the spelling as an artistic name.

== Club career ==
=== Early career ===
Born in Rio de Janeiro, he began his career as a forward in 2006, as part of Arturzinho's squad. He was loaned to Paysandu in 2007, when he played a single game, against Tuna Luso in the Campeonato Paraense.

Cortez's first professional contract was with Qatari club Al-Shahaniya in 2007. He moved back to his home country to play for Rio de Janeiro state-based club Castelo Branco from 2008 to 2009,. He left the club to defend Quissamã, also from Rio de Janeiro state, for the 2009 and 2010 seasons. He joined Nova Iguaçu in 2011, playing 14 Campeonato Carioca games for the club during that season. In March of the same year, Nova Iguaçu received a bid from Remo for the defender but rejected the offer.

=== Botafogo ===
Rio de Janeiro city-based club Botafogo acquired 50% of his economic rights after the conclusion of the Campeonato Carioca. He played 28 Série A games for the club during the 2011 season. Cortez played his first game for the club on 22 May 2011, at Estádio Benedito Teixeira, in São José do Rio Preto, on a 2–0 defeat against Palmeiras. He played his last match for Botafogo on 4 December 2011, on a 1–1 tie against Fluminense at Estádio Raulino de Oliveira, in Volta Redonda, for the last round of the Série A.

=== São Paulo ===
Cortez transfer to Série A club São Paulo was announced on 17 December 2011, with the contract being signed four days later. He played his first game for the Tricolor on 22 January 2012, in a 4–0 victory against Botafogo-SP at the Estádio do Morumbi, for the Campeonato Paulista championship. He scored his first goal for São Paulo on 23 May 2012, against Goiás, at the Estádio Serra Dourada, for the year's Copa do Brasil.

In May 2013, after São Paulo knock-off from both the State League and Copa Libertadores, Cortez was removed from the club's roster by president Juvenal Juvêncio and manager Ney Franco and, alongside four other players, transfer-listed.

==== Benfica (loan) ====
São Paulo loaned Cortez to Portuguese Primeira Liga side Benfica for a year in July 2013. Arriving at the Portuguese side, he stated that playing in Europe was his opportunity to earn a spot back at the Brazilian squad and end his two-year absence.

Falling out of favour at Jorge Jesus' squad, Cortez ended his loan spell on 11 January 2014 and returned to São Paulo. Cortez was reported stating "I'll be eternally thankful to the Portuguese club for everything that they did for me and to Jorge Jesus for the opportunity. It didn't work out due to things that happen in football, but I'm positive that I left with an open door."

==== Criciúma (loan) ====
São Paulo loaned Cortez again, this time to Criciúma in April 2014 for the duration of the 2014 season.

==== Albirex Niigata (loan) ====
On 20 January 2015, Cortez signed a two-year loan deal with Albirex Niigata.

=== Grêmio ===
After two years playing in Japan, Cortez came back to Brazil in 2017 and discussed his contractual rescission with São Paulo. At this moment, Cortez prioritize to play in his home country. He joined Grêmio shortly after cutting ties with São Paulo.

== International career ==
Cortez was called up for the Brazil national football team to compete against Argentina in both Superclásico das Américas matches, and was capped for the first time in the 2-0 Brazil victory on 14 September 2011 at the Estadio Mario Alberto Kempes in Córdoba. He also appeared in the second leg on 28 September at the Mangueirão in Belém.

== Career statistics ==
=== Club ===
Appearances and goals by club, season and competition
Club	Season	League			State League		Cup		League Cup		Continental		Other		Total	
Club	Season	Division	Apps	Goals	Apps	Goals	Apps	Goals	Apps	Goals	Apps	Goals	Apps	Goals	Apps	Goals
Paysandu	2007	Série C	0	0	1	0	0	0	—		—		—		1	0
Castelo Branco	2008	Carioca Série C	—		18	1	—		—		—		—		18	1
Quissamã	2009	Carioca Série B	—		7	0	—		—		—		7	0	14	0
Quissamã	2010	Carioca Série B	—		17	0	—		—		—		3	0	20	0
Quissamã	Total		—		24	0	—		—		—		10	0	34	0
Nova Iguaçu	2011	Carioca	—		14	0	—		—		—		—		14	0
Botafogo	2011	Série A	28	0	—		2	0	—		2	0	—		32	0
São Paulo	2012	Série A	35	1	20	0	9	1	—		10	0	—		74	2
São Paulo	2013	Série A	0	0	11	0	0	0	—		6	0	—		17	0
São Paulo	Total		35	1	31	0	9	1	—		16	0	—		91	2
Benfica	2013–14	Primeira Liga	6	0	—		1	0	0	0	0	0	—		7	0
Criciúma	2014	Série A	21	0	—		—		—		0	0	—		21	0
Albirex Niigata	2015	J1 League	26	0	—		1	0	6	0	—		—		33	0
Albirex Niigata	2016	J1 League	27	1	—		1	0	5	0	—		—		33	1
Albirex Niigata	Total		53	1	—		2	0	11	0	—		—		66	1
Grêmio	2017	Série A	24	1	2	0	6	0	—		10	0	4	0	46	1
Grêmio	2018	Série A	26	0	11	0	2	0	—		10	0	2	0	51	0
Grêmio	2019	Série A	21	1	8	0	4	0	—		12	0	—		45	1
Grêmio	2020	Série A	23	0	12	0	2	0	—		5	0	—		42	0
Grêmio	2021	Série A	19	0	10	0	4	0	—		9	0	—		42	0
Grêmio	Total		113	2	43	0	18	0	—		46	0	6	0	236	2
Avaí	2022	Série A	27	0	6	0	2	0	—		—		—		35	0
Mirassol	2023	Série B	1	0	1	0	0	0	—		—		—		2	0
Avaí	2023	Série B	18	0	—		—		—		—		—		18	0
Sampaio Corrêa	2024	Série C	6	0	13	0	4	0	—		—		1	0	24	0
Career total			308	4	151	2	38	1	11	0	64	0	17	0	609	7

=== International ===
As of 25 January 2017

Brazil
Year	Apps	Goals
2011	1	0
Total	1	0

== Honours ==
=== Club ===
São Paulo

- Copa Sudamericana: 2012

Benfica

- Primeira Liga: 2013–14
- Taça de Portugal: 2013–14

Grêmio

- Copa Libertadores: 2017
- Recopa Sudamericana: 2018
- Campeonato Gaúcho: 2018, 2019, 2020, 2021
- Recopa Gaúcha: 2019

=== International ===
Brazil

- Superclásico de las Américas: 2011

=== Individual ===
- Campeonato Brasileiro Série A Team of the Year: 2011
