= Mateus Sarará =

Brazilian footballer

Personal information
- Full name: Mateus Ferreira
- Date of birth: 29 June 2002 (age 24)
- Place of birth: Viamão, Brazil
- Height: 1.81 m (5 ft 11 in)
- Position: Defensive midfielder

Team information
- Current team: Tondela
- Number: 37

Youth career
- 2011–2021: Grêmio

Senior career*
Years	Team	Apps	(Gls)
2021–2023	Grêmio	21	(0)
2022	→ Avaí (loan)	8	(1)
2023	Trofense	10	(0)
2023–2026	Santa Clara	0	(0)
2024	→ Alverca (loan)	4	(0)
2025	→ Guarani (loan)	22	(0)
2025–2026	→ Portimonense (loan)	19	(2)
2026–	Tondela	2	(1)
- * Club domestic league appearances and goals as of 12 September 2026

Mateus Ferreira (born 29 June 2002), known as Mateus Sarará or just Sarará, is a Brazilian professional footballer who plays as a defensive midfielder for Liga Portugal 2 club Tondela.

== Club career ==
Born in Porto Alegre, Brazil, Mateus Sarará joined the youth Academy of local powerhouses Grêmio at the age of 9 in 2011.

Having first come through the youth ranks of the club at the start of 2021, Sarará made his professional debut with Grêmio on 28 May, starting the away match against Deportivo La Equidad (the last game of the group stage of the Copa Sudamericana), playing the entirety of it as a right-back as the two sides drew 0-0. Almost two months later, on 13 July, he also took part in the first leg of the round of 16, coming in as a substitute for the injured Lucas Silva in the 78th minute of a 0-1 away win against L.D.U. Quito. However, just one week later, the Ecuadorian side nicked a 2-1 win to reverse the result and advance to the tournament's quarter finals due to the away goals rule: this time, Sararà stayed on the bench for the whole game.

On September 16, the player also made his debut in the Copa do Brasil, starting the second leg of the cup tie against Flamengo and playing for 61 minutes as a defensive midfielder before getting replaced by Lucas Silva due to an injury: Grêmio eventually lost the match for 2-0.

Finally, just four days later, Sararà made his national league debut against the same side, again replacing Lucas Silva in the 83rd minute as Grêmio managed to gain a 0-1 away win. With the club struggling to fight against relegation, through the fall the player rapidly became a more frequent back-up choice in the team under Luiz Felipe Scolari and Vagner Mancini, rotating in the CDM role with Silva himself, as well as Thiago Santos and Darlan. On 9 November 2021, Mancini handed Sararà his first league start in a home match against Fluminense: in the occasion, he played for 73 minutes and assisted Diego Souza for the only goal of the match.

== Career statistics ==
=== Club ===
As of 25 November 2021

Appearances and goals by club, season and competition
Club	Season	League			State League		National Cup		Continental		Other		Total	
Club	Season	Division	Apps	Goals	Apps	Goals	Apps	Goals	Apps	Goals	Apps	Goals	Apps	Goals
Grêmio	2021	Série A	8	0	0	0	1	0	2 (Note: Appearance(s) in Copa Sudamericana.)	0	—		11	0
Career total			8	0	0	0	1	0	2	0	0	0	11	0

== Honours ==
Grêmio

- Campeonato Gaúcho: 2021, 2022
- Recopa Gaúcha: 2021, 2022
