= Jean Pyerre =

Brazilian footballer

Personal information
- Full name: Jean Pyerre Casagrande Silveira Correa
- Date of birth: 7 May 1998 (age 28)
- Place of birth: Alvorada, Brazil
- Height: 1.83 m (6 ft 0 in)
- Position: Attacking midfielder

Team information
- Current team: Ituano
- Number: 20

Youth career
- 2008–2019: Grêmio

Senior career*
Years	Team	Apps	(Gls)
2017–2023	Grêmio	100	(14)
2022	→ Avaí	23	(1)
2024–	Ituano	7	(0)
- * Club domestic league appearances and goals as of 21:09, 5 July 2024 (UTC)

Jean Pyerre Casagrande Silveira Correa (born 7 May 1998), known as Jean Pyerre, is a Brazilian professional footballer who plays as an attacking midfielder for Ituano.

== Club career ==
=== Grêmio ===
Jean Pyerre is a youth exponent from Grêmio. He made his league debut on 13 August 2017, against Botafogo in a 1–0 away loss. He replaced Lincoln after 82 minutes.

==== Loan to Giresunspor ====
On 30 January 2022, Jean Pyerre was loaned to Süper Lig club Giresunspor. Shortly after passing medical examinations at his new club, it was identified that Pyerre had testicular cancer and he subsequently returned to Brazil.

== Honors ==
Grêmio

- Campeonato Gaúcho: 2019, 2020, 2021
- Recopa Gaúcha: 2021
