= Thaciano =

Brazilian footballer

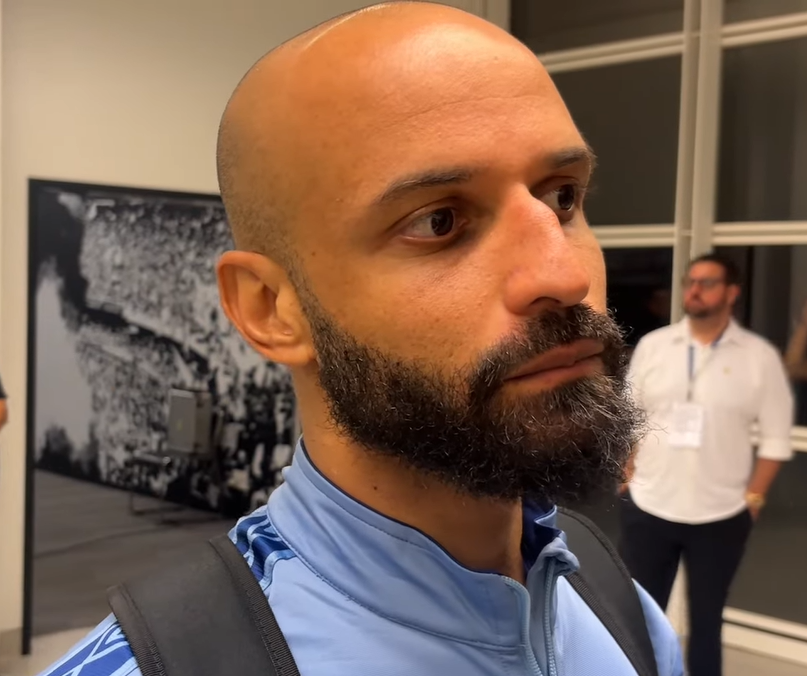
- Thaciano in 2025

Personal information
- Full name: Thaciano Mickael da Silva
- Date of birth: 12 May 1995 (age 31)
- Place of birth: Campina Grande, Brazil
- Height: 1.82 m (6 ft 0 in)
- Positions: Midfielder; forward

Team information
- Current team: Santos
- Number: 16

Youth career
- Porto-PE

Senior career*
Years	Team	Apps	(Gls)
2013–2015	Porto-PE	41	(5)
2015	→ Boa Esporte (loan)	11	(4)
2016–2019	Boa Esporte	36	(11)
2016–2017	→ Santos (loan)	0	(0)
2018–2019	→ Grêmio (loan)	26	(3)
2019–2023	Grêmio	80	(8)
2021	→ Bahia (loan)	11	(2)
2021–2022	→ Altay (loan)	28	(3)
2023–2024	Bahia	78	(15)
2025–	Santos	58	(9)
- * Club domestic league appearances and goals as of 17:27, 19 November 2026 (UTC)

Thaciano Mickael da Silva (born 12 May 1995), simply known as Thaciano, is a Brazilian footballer who plays as either a midfielder or a forward for Santos.

== Club career ==
=== Porto-PE ===
Born in Campina Grande, Paraíba, Thaciano was a Porto de Caruaru youth graduate. Promoted to the first team in 2013, he made his senior debut on 20 January of that year by starting in a 0–4 Campeonato Pernambucano home loss against Central.

Thaciano was an undisputed for Porto during the 2014 campaign, as his side achieved a place in Série D.

=== Boa Esporte ===
On 13 January 2015, after fully recovering from an injury, Thaciano joined Série B side Boa Esporte on loan until the end of the year. He made his professional debut on 1 September, coming on as a late substitute in a 1–2 home loss against Paraná.

Thaciano scored his first goal on 16 October 2015, netting the second in a 2–2 home draw against Sampaio Corrêa. He contributed with 11 appearances, scoring four goals, as his side suffered relegation.

Ahead of the 2016 season, Thaciano was bought outright by Boa.

==== Loan to Santos ====
On 9 May 2016, Thaciano was loaned to Santos for one year. The following January, after appearing with the B-team in the Copa Paulista, he was promoted to the first team by manager Dorival Júnior.

==== 2017 season ====
On 29 June 2017, Thaciano returned to his parent club after an agreement between Santos and Boa Esporte was not reached; he only represented the main squad once, in a friendly against KAC Kénitra. On 16 July, he scored a brace for Boa in a 2–2 away draw against Londrina.

=== Grêmio ===
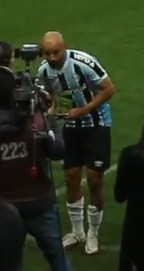
Thaciano as a Grêmio player in 2022

On 29 November 2017, after scoring a career-best ten goals, Thaciano agreed to a two-year loan deal with Grêmio, with a buyout clause. On 7 May 2019, he was bought outright by the club for a fee of R$ 2 million for 80% of his federative rights, and signed a three-year contract.

On 23 November 2020, Thaciano renewed his link with the Tricolor until 2024.

==== Loans to Bahia and Altay ====
On 1 April 2021, Thaciano was loaned to Bahia until the end of the year. On 16 July, however, he moved abroad and joined Süper Lig side Altay also in a temporary deal.

Thaciano ended his stint in European football, where he made 31 appearances, scored three goals, and provided one assist.

=== Bahia return ===
On 31 March 2023, Thaciano signed a permanent deal with Bahia until 2025. He immediately established himself as a starter, before renewing his contract until 2027 on 21 March 2024.

Thaciano finished the 2024 season with 15 goals, also scoring the club's goal number 10,000 back in March.

=== Santos return ===
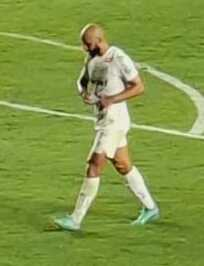
Thaciano with Santos in 2026

On 13 January 2025, Santos announced the return of Thaciano on a permanent four-year contract. He scored his first goal for the club on 16 February, netting the side's second in a 3–1 Campeonato Paulista home win over Água Santa.

Criticized by the supporters throughout the year, Thaciano scored a brace in a 3–0 home win over Cruzeiro on 7 December 2025, which not only ensured the club in the first division but also qualified them to the 2026 Copa Sudamericana, and ended the season with five goals.

== Career statistics ==
As of 19 November 2026

Club	Season	League			State League		Cup		Continental		Other		Total	
Club	Season	Division	Apps	Goals	Apps	Goals	Apps	Goals	Apps	Goals	Apps	Goals	Apps	Goals
Porto-PE	2013	Pernambucano	—		5	0	—		—		—		5	0
Porto-PE	2014	Série D	8	2	24	3	—		—		—		32	5
Porto-PE	2015	Pernambucano	—		4	0	—		—		—		4	0
Porto-PE	Total		8	2	33	3	—		—		—		41	5
Boa Esporte	2015	Série B	11	4	—		—		—		—		11	4
Boa Esporte	2016	Série C	0	0	9	1	—		—		—		9	1
Boa Esporte	2017	Série B	27	10	—		—		—		—		27	10
Boa Esporte	Total		38	14	9	1	—		—		—		47	15
Santos (loan)	2016	Série A	—		—		—		—		16 (Note: Appearance(s) in Copa Paulista)	5	16	5
Santos (loan)	2017	Série A	0	0	—		0	0	—		—		0	0
Santos (loan)	Total		0	0	—		0	0	—		16	5	16	5
Grêmio	2018	Série A	17	1	3	0	1	1	6 (Note: Appearance(s) in Copa Libertadores)	0	0	0	27	2
Grêmio	2019	Série A	22	2	5	2	4	0	4	1	—		35	5
Grêmio	2020	Série A	25	2	7	0	8	1	4	1	—		44	4
Grêmio	2021	Série A	0	0	3	1	0	0	2	0	—		5	1
Grêmio	2022	Série B	13	2	—		—		—		—		13	2
Grêmio	2023	Série A	0	0	11	1	1	0	—		1 (Note: Appearance(s) in Recopa Gaúcha)	0	13	1
Grêmio	Total		77	7	29	4	14	2	16	2	1	0	137	15
Bahia (loan)	2021	Série A	11	2	0	0	3	1	6 (Note: Appearance(s) in Copa Sudamericana)	1	6 (Note: Appearance(s) in Copa do Nordeste)	1	26	5
Altay (loan)	2021–22	Süper Lig	28	3	—		3	0	—		—		31	3
Bahia	2023	Série A	35	6	—		—		—		—		35	6
Bahia	2024	Série A	35	7	8	2	8	2	—		9	4	60	15
Bahia	Total		70	13	8	2	8	2	—		9	4	95	21
Santos	2025	Série A	19	3	11	2	1	0	—		—		31	5
Santos	2026	Série A	21	2	7	2	3	0	7	1	—		38	5
Santos	Total		40	5	18	4	4	0	7	1	—		69	10
Career total			272	46	97	14	32	5	29	4	32	10	462	79

== Honours ==
Bahia

- Copa do Nordeste: 2021

Grêmio

- Recopa Sudamericana: 2018
- Campeonato Gaúcho: 2018, 2019, 2020, 2021, 2023
- Recopa Gaúcha: 2019, 2023
