= Fernando Henrique (footballer, born 2001) =

Brazilian footballer

Personal information
- Full name: Fernando Henrique do Nascimento Pereira
- Date of birth: 1 June 2001 (age 25)
- Place of birth: São José de Mipibu, Brazil
- Height: 1.82 m (6 ft 0 in)
- Position: Defensive midfielder

Team information
- Current team: Oleksandriya
- Number: 5

Youth career
- 2016–2018: ABC
- 2017–2018: → Grêmio (loan)
- 2018–2021: Grêmio

Senior career*
Years	Team	Apps	(Gls)
2021–2022	Grêmio	23	(0)
2023–2025	Cruzeiro	7	(0)
2024	→ Vila Nova (loan)	2	(0)
2025	→ Portuguesa (loan)	9	(0)
2025	→ CRB (loan)	9	(0)
2025–	Oleksandriya	21	(0)

International career^{‡}
2019	Brazil U18		
2019	Brazil U20	2	(0)
- * Club domestic league appearances and goals as of 3 June 2026 ‡ National team caps and goals as of 18 March 2021

Fernando Henrique do Nascimento Pereira (born 1 June 2001), known as Fernando Henrique, is a Brazilian professional footballer who plays as a defensive midfielder for Oleksandriya.

== Club career ==
=== Grêmio ===
Fernando Henrique was born in Goianinha but registered in São José de Mipibu, both in the state of Rio Grande do Norte. He joined the youth categories of Grêmio at the age of 16 in 2017, on loan from ABC, before being bought outright by the club in the following year.

In 2020, Fernando Henrique was assigned to the under-23 squad for the Campeonato Brasileiro de Aspirantes, and renewed his contract until 2024 on 26 November of that year. He made his first team debut on 22 March 2021, coming on as a second-half substitute for Lucas Araújo in a 1–1 Campeonato Gaúcho away draw against São José-RS.

After featuring in 16 matches during the 2021 season, Fernando Henrique lost space during the 2022 campaign, and had a failed loan move to Cruzeiro before returning to the under-23s.

On 2 January 2023, Grêmio released Fernando Henrique, but kept a percentage of his economic rights.

=== Cruzeiro ===
On 10 January 2023, Fernando Henrique signed a three-year deal with Cruzeiro. Nine days after arriving, however, he suffered a knee injury which sidelined him for six months.

==== Loan to Vila Nova ====
On 27 February 2024, after seven matches for Cruzeiro, Fernando Henrique was loaned to Série B side Vila Nova for the remainder of the year. In June, however, his loan was cut short; he only featured in five matches.

Upon returning, Fernando Henrique was separated from the first team squad by head coach Fernando Seabra, only returning to trainings with the main squad in late September 2024, with new head coach Fernando Diniz.

==== Loan to Portuguesa ====
On 19 December 2024, Fernando Henrique was announced at Portuguesa.

== Career statistics ==
As of 2 March 2025

Appearances and goals by club, season and competition
Club	Season	League			State League		National Cup		Continental		Other		Total	
Club	Season	Division	Apps	Goals	Apps	Goals	Apps	Goals	Apps	Goals	Apps	Goals	Apps	Goals
Grêmio	2021	Série A	4	0	5	0	1	0	6 (Note: Two appearances in Copa Libertadores, four appearances in Copa Sudamericana.)	0	1 (Note: Appearance(s) in Recopa Gaúcha)	0	17	0
Grêmio	2022	Série B	1	0	4	0	0	0	—		9 (Note: One appearance in Recopa Gaúcha, eight appearances in Copa FGF.)	0	14	0
Grêmio	Total		5	0	9	0	1	0	6	0	10	0	31	0
Cruzeiro	2023	Série A	7	0	0	0	0	0	—		—		7	0
Cruzeiro	2024	Série A	0	0	0	0	0	0	0	0	—		0	0
Cruzeiro	Total		7	0	0	0	0	0	0	0	—		7	0
Vila Nova (loan)	2024	Série B	0	0	2	0	—		—		3 (Note: Appearance(s) in Copa Verde)	0	5	0
Portuguesa (loan)	2025	Série D	0	0	9	0	1	0	—		—		10	0
Career total			12	0	20	0	2	0	6	0	13	0	53	0

== Honours ==
Grêmio

- Campeonato Gaúcho: 2021, 2022
- Recopa Gaúcha: 2021, 2022
