= Rodrigues (footballer, born 1997) =

Brazilian footballer

Personal information
- Full name: Antônio Josenildo Rodrigues de Oliveira
- Date of birth: 10 October 1997 (age 29)
- Place of birth: Arês, Brazil
- Height: 1.88 m (6 ft 2 in)
- Position: Centre-back

Team information
- Current team: Kalamata
- Number: 97

Youth career
- 2013–2015: ABC
- 2015–2017: Cruzeiro

Senior career*
Years	Team	Apps	(Gls)
2017–2019	ABC	40	(2)
2018–2019	→ Grêmio (loan)	0	(0)
2019–2024	Grêmio	54	(0)
2022–2023	→ San Jose Earthquakes (loan)	41	(1)
2024–2025	San Jose Earthquakes	45	(4)
2026	Mirassol	4	(0)
2026–	Kalamata	5	(0)
- * Club domestic league appearances and goals as of 20 September 2026

Antônio Josenildo Rodrigues de Oliveira (born 10 October 1997), commonly known as Rodrigues, is a Brazilian professional footballer who plays as a centre-back for Super League Greece club Kalamata.

== Career ==
Rodrigues began playing football with the youth academy of ABC in 2013, then Cruzeiro in 2015 before returning to ABC again in 2017. He began playing under the name Tonhão, before switching to Rodrigues to honour his adoptive mother. He made his professional debut with ABC in a 2–0 Campeonato Brasileiro Série B loss to Vila Nova on 26 August 2017. On 9 August 2019, he signed a professional contract with Grêmio after a brief loan with them.

On 15 January, 2026, Rodrigues signed for Mirassol.

== Career statistics ==
=== Club ===
As of match played 6 March 2026

Appearances and goals by club, season and competition
Club	Season	League			State League		National cup		Continental		Other		Total	
Club	Season	Division	Apps	Goals	Apps	Goals	Apps	Goals	Apps	Goals	Apps	Goals	Apps	Goals
Cruzeiro	2016	Série A	0	0	—		—		—		—		0	0
ABC	2017	Série B	14	1	2 (Note: Appearance(s) in Campeonato Potiguar)	0	0	0	—		1 (Note: Appearance(s) in Copa do Nordeste)	0	17	1
ABC	2018	Série C	12	0	12	1	1	0	—		9	0	34	1
ABC	Total		26	1	14	1	1	0	—		10	0	51	2
Grêmio (loan)	2018	Série A	0	0	—		—		—		—		0	0
Grêmio (loan)	2019	Série A	5	0	0	0	1	0	0	0	—		6	0
Grêmio (loan)	Total		5	0	0	0	1	0	0	0	—		6	0
Grêmio	2019	Série A	3	0	—		—		0	0	—		3	0
Grêmio	2020	Série A	24	0	2 (Note: Appearance(s) in Campeonato Gaúcho)	0	2	0	5 (Note: Appearance(s) in Copa Libertadores)	2	—		33	2
Grêmio	2021	Série A	12	0	9	0	4	0	5 (Note: Two appearances in Copa Sudamericana, Three appearances in Copa Libertadores)	0	—		30	0
Grêmio	2022	Série B	7	0	10	2	0	0	—		—		17	2
Grêmio	Total		46	0	21	2	6	0	10	2	—		83	4
San Jose Earthquakes (loan)	2022	MLS	7	0	—		—		—		—		7	0
San Jose Earthquakes (loan)	2023	MLS	35	1	—		1	0	2 (Note: Appearance(s) in Leagues Cup)	0	—		38	1
San Jose Earthquakes (loan)	Total		42	1	—		1	0	2	0	—		45	1
San Jose Earthquakes	2024	MLS	25	3	—		0	0	4	0	—		29	3
San Jose Earthquakes	2025	MLS	20	1	—		2	0	0	0	—		22	1
San Jose Earthquakes	Total		45	4	—		2	0	4	0	—		51	4
Mirassol	2026	Série A	1	0	2 (Note: Appearance(s) in Campeonato Paulista)	0	0	0	0	0	—		3	0
Career Total			165	6	37	3	10	0	16	2	10	0	240	11

== Honours ==
ABC

- Campeonato Potiguar: 2017, 2018

Grêmio

- Campeonato Gaúcho: 2019, 2020, 2021, 2022
- Recopa Gaúcha: 2019, 2021, 2022
