= Maicon (footballer, born 1985) =

Brazilian footballer

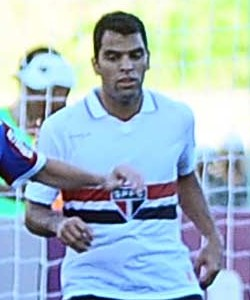
- Maicon with São Paulo in 2012

Personal information
- Full name: Maicon Thiago Pereira de Souza
- Date of birth: 14 September 1985 (age 41)
- Place of birth: Rio de Janeiro, Brazil
- Height: 1.83 m (6 ft 0 in)
- Position: Central midfielder

Youth career
- 2003: Madureira

Senior career*
Years	Team	Apps	(Gls)
2004–2005	Fluminense	39	(1)
2005	Bangu	4	(2)
2006	Botafogo	5	(0)
2006	Madureira	4	(0)
2007–2010	MSV Duisburg	28	(3)
2009–2010	→ Figueirense (loan)	48	(6)
2011	Figueirense	44	(4)
2012–2015	São Paulo	154	(9)
2015	→ Grêmio (loan)	40	(1)
2016–2022	Grêmio	208	(14)
2022	CRB	7	(0)
- * Club domestic league appearances and goals as of 17 November 2016

Maicon Thiago Pereira de Souza (born 14 September 1985), simply known as Maicon, is a former Brazilian professional footballer who played as a central midfielder.

== Career ==
On 11 September 2009, Maicon signed for Figueirense, on loan from MSV Duisburg. He is a former player of Botafogo and Fluminense. After a good season with Figueirense, in December 2011, he signed with São Paulo.

=== São Paulo ===
Maicon came to São Paulo in December 2011, after shining for Figueirense. In that time, he said that lived "the best phase of career" and had "motivation" for going on at new club. He also said to be an athlete "that organizes the team, with good pass and who has good shoot".

Despite his good performances in his first season for Tricolor side, in whose season he scored twice in a derby against Corinthians, in a victory by 3–1, a game valid by Campeonato Brasileiro Série A, Maicon never was popular among fans, who never trusted about his footballer qualities.

In a hard 2013 season, when the team fought against relegation, Muricy Ramalho's coming changed Maicon's phase. Besides of taking off the club from relegation, Ramalho was fundamental for Maicon shines and, along with Paulo Henrique Ganso, another player who lived a bad shape, has become an important footballer for São Paulo's midfield. Ramalho also surprised about criticisms on Maicon. According to the coach, Maicon is a player "who knows how to play the game".

== Honours ==
Fluminense

- Taça Rio: 2005
- Campeonato Carioca: 2005

Madureira

- Taça Rio: 2006

São Paulo

- Copa Sudamericana: 2012

Grêmio

- Copa do Brasil: 2016
- Copa Libertadores: 2017
- Recopa Sudamericana: 2018
- Campeonato Gaúcho: 2018, 2019, 2020, 2021
- Recopa Gaúcha: 2019
