= Leonardo Pereira =

Leonardo Pereira may refer to:

- Léo Pereira (footballer, born 1996), Brazilian football centre-back
- Léo Pereira (footballer, born 2000), Brazilian football winger

== See also ==
- Léo Ceará (born 1995), full name Leonardo de Sousa Pereira, Brazilian football forward
