= Darlan (footballer, born 1998) =

Brazilian footballer

Personal information
- Full name: Darlan Pereira Mendes
- Date of birth: 16 April 1998 (age 28)
- Place of birth: São Borja, Brazil
- Height: 1.74 m (5 ft 9 in)
- Position: Midfielder

Team information
- Current team: Santa Clara
- Number: 37

Youth career
- 2010–2019: Grêmio

Senior career*
Years	Team	Apps	(Gls)
2019–2023	Grêmio	46	(1)
2022	→ Juventude (loan)	5	(0)
2022	→ Chapecoense (loan)	13	(0)
2023–2024	Levski Sofia	12	(1)
2024–2025	Wuhan Three Towns	60	(5)
2026–	Santa Clara	7	(0)
- * Club domestic league appearances and goals as of 11 May 2026

Darlan Pereira Mendes (born 16 April 1998), sometimes known as just Darlan, is a Brazilian professional footballer who plays for Primeira Liga club Santa Clara. He is currently played as a midfielder.

== Professional career ==
Darlan joined the youth academy of Grêmio at the age of 12. Darlan made his professional debut with Grêmio in a 3–0 Campeonato Gaúcho win over São José-PA on 9 March 2019.

On 25 July 2023, Darlan moved abroad, signing a 3-year deal with Levski Sofia.

On 20 February 2024, Levski announced that Darlan would be transferring to Chinese Super League club Wuhan Three Towns. On 13 December 2025, Darlan annouanced his departure after the 2025 season.

== Career statistics ==
As of match played 11 May 2026

Appearances and goals by club, season and competition
Club	Season	League			State League		Cup		Continental		Other		Total	
Club	Season	Division	Apps	Goals	Apps	Goals	Apps	Goals	Apps	Goals	Apps	Goals	Apps	Goals
Grêmio	2019	Série A	13	0	3	0	0	0	0	0	—		16	0
Grêmio	2020	Série A	21	1	6	0	3	0	7	0	—		37	1
Grêmio	2021	Série A	11	0	11	0	2	0	6	0	—		30	0
Grêmio	2023	Série A	1	0	1	0	1	0	—		—		3	0
Grêmio	Total		46	1	21	0	6	0	13	0	—		87	1
Juventude (loan)	2022	Série A	5	0	6	0	3	0	—		—		14	0
Chapecoense (loan)	2022	Série B	13	0	—		—		—		—		13	0
Levski Sofia	2023–24	First League	12	1	—		2	0	4	0	—		18	1
Wuhan Three Towns	2024	Chinese Super League	30	4	—		1	0	—		—		31	4
Wuhan Three Towns	2025	Chinese Super League	30	1	—		0	0	—		—		30	1
Wuhan Three Towns	Total		60	5	—		1	0	—		—		61	5
Santa Clara	2025–26	Primeira Liga	7	0	—		—		—		—		7	0
Career total			143	7	27	0	12	0	17	0	0	0	199	7

== Honours ==
Grêmio

- Recopa Sudamericana: 2018
- Campeonato Gaúcho: 2018, 2019, 2020, 2021, 2023
- Recopa Gaúcha: 2023
