= Pedro Lucas (footballer, born 2002) =

Brazilian footballer

Personal information
- Full name: Pedro Lucas Tápias Obermüller
- Date of birth: 26 July 2002 (age 24)
- Place of birth: Baixo Guandu, Brazil
- Height: 1.73 m (5 ft 8 in)
- Position: Attacking midfielder

Team information
- Current team: PAOK B
- Number: 44

Youth career
- 2014–2022: Grêmio

Senior career*
Years	Team	Apps	(Gls)
2020–2024	Grêmio	29	(1)
2023	→ Ceará (loan)	7	(0)
2024-2025	Operário	31	(0)
2025–	PAOK B	0	(0)

International career
2019	Brazil U17	11	(0)
- * Club domestic league appearances and goals as of 29 March 2025

Pedro Lucas Tápias Obermüller (born 26 July 2002), known as Pedro Lucas, is a Brazilian professional footballer who plays as an attacking midfielder for Super League 2 club PAOK B

== Club career ==
=== Early career ===
Born in Baixo Guandu, Espírito Santo, Pedro Lucas impressed Ronaldo at the age of nine, after his father uploaded videos of him playing and posted on social media. He also spent a week on trial at Real Madrid, after being sponsored by Ronaldo.

=== Grêmio ===
In February 2014, aged 12, Pedro Lucas and his staff agreed to join the youth setup of Grêmio, starting from March. On 31 August 2018, he signed his first professional contract with the club, agreeing to a three-year deal and having a € 40 million release clause.

On 28 November 2020, Pedro Lucas renewed his contract with the Tricolor until 2024. He made his first team debut on 3 March of the following year, coming on as a second-half substitute for Thaciano in a 4–1 Campeonato Gaúcho home routing of Brasil de Pelotas.

Pedro Lucas scored his first professional goal on 22 March 2021, netting the equalizer in a 1–1 away draw against São José-RS. After six matches in the 2021 Campeonato Gaúcho, he moved down to the under-23 team for the remainder of the year.

Pedro Lucas returned to the first team of Grêmio during the 2022 season, being mainly a backup option as they achieved promotion from the Série B.

==== Loan to Ceará ====
On 13 February 2023, Pedro Lucas was announced at second division side Ceará on loan for the remainder of the year. After making his debut for the club in a Copa do Nordeste match under head coach Gustavo Morínigo, he only made one appearance under Guto Ferreira before playing the last five matches of the season, now under Vagner Mancini.

== International career ==
In October 2019, after previously featuring in friendlies with the side during the year, Pedro Lucas was called up to the Brazil national under-17 team in the place of Reinier for the 2019 FIFA U-17 World Cup. After starting the tournament as a backup, he featured in all the four remaining matches as Brazil lifted the trophy for the fourth time.

== Career statistics ==
As of 23 March 2021.

Appearances and goals by club, season and competition
Club	Season	League			State league		National cup		Continental		Other		Total	
Club	Season	Division	Apps	Goals	Apps	Goals	Apps	Goals	Apps	Goals	Apps	Goals	Apps	Goals
Grêmio	2021	Série A	0	0	6 (Note: Appearance(s) in Campeonato Gaúcho.)	1	0	0	2 (Note: One appearance in Copa Libertadores, one appearance in Copa Sudamericana.)	0	—		8	1
Grêmio	2022	Série B	9	0	2	0	0	0	—		—		11	0
Grêmio	2023	Série A	0	0	0	0	0	0	—		—		0	0
Grêmio	Total		9	0	8	1	0	0	2	0	—		19	1
Ceará (loan)	2023	Série B	6	0	—		—		—		1 (Note: Appearance(s) in Copa do Nordeste.)	0	7	0
Career total			15	0	8	1	0	0	2	0	1	0	26	1

== Honours ==
Brazil U17

- FIFA U-17 World Cup: 2019

Grêmio

- Campeonato Gaúcho: 2021, 2022, 2024
- Recopa Gaúcha: 2021

Ceará

- Copa do Nordeste: 2023
