= Pedro Lucas =

Pedro Lucas may refer to:

- Pedro Lucas (footballer, born 1998), full name Pedro Lucas Schwaizer, Brazilian football forward
- Pedro Lucas (footballer, born 2002), full name Pedro Lucas Tápias Obermüller, Brazilian football attacking midfielder
- Pedro Lucas (rugby union), Portuguese rugby union player
