= Ruan Tressoldi =

Brazilian footballer (born 1999)

Personal information
- Full name: Ruan Tressoldi Netto
- Date of birth: 7 June 1999 (age 27)
- Place of birth: Tramandaí, Brazil
- Height: 1.87 m (6 ft 2 in)
- Position: Centre-back

Team information
- Current team: Atlético Mineiro
- Number: 4

Youth career
- –2018: Novo Hamburgo
- 2017–2018: → Grêmio (loan)
- 2019–2020: Grêmio

Senior career*
Years	Team	Apps	(Gls)
2017–2018	Novo Hamburgo	0	(0)
2017–2018	→ Grêmio (loan)	2	(0)
2019–2021	Grêmio	23	(0)
2021–2026	Sassuolo	59	(0)
2021	→ Grêmio (loan)	17	(0)
2024–2025	→ São Paulo (loan)	16	(0)
2025–2026	→ Atlético Mineiro (loan)	35	(3)
2026–	Atlético Mineiro	5	(1)
- * Club domestic league appearances and goals as of 21:24, 10 November 2026 (UTC)

Ruan Tressoldi Netto (born 7 June 1999), sometimes known simply as Ruan, is a Brazilian professional footballer who plays as a centre-back for Campeonato Brasileiro Série A club Atlético Mineiro.

== Career ==
Ruan Tressoldi made his professional debut with Grêmio in a 4–3 Campeonato Brasileiro Série A loss to Atlético Mineiro on 3 December 2017.

On 11 August 2021, Ruan Tressoldi signed for Serie A club Sassuolo on a deal reportedly worth €5 million; it was also confirmed that he would remain at Grêmio on loan until the end of 2021.

On 19 August 2024, Tressoldi was loaned to São Paulo until 30 June 2025, with an option to buy.

On 25 August 2025, Tressoldi joined Atlético Mineiro on loan until June 2026, on a deal including an option to buy.

== Personal life ==
Ruan Tressoldi's twin brother, Ramon Tressoldi, is also a footballer in Brazil.

== Career statistics ==
As of 10 November 2026

Appearances and goals by club, season and competition
Club	Season	League			State league		National cup (Note: Includes Copa do Brasil, Coppa Italia)		Continental		Other		Total	
Club	Season	Division	Apps	Goals	Apps	Goals	Apps	Goals	Apps	Goals	Apps	Goals	Apps	Goals
Grêmio	2017	Série A	1	0	0	0	0	0	0	0	0	0	1	0
Grêmio	2018	Série A	0	0	1	0	0	0	0	0	0	0	1	0
Grêmio	2019	Série A	1	0	0	0	0	0	0	0	0	0	1	0
Grêmio	2020	Série A	4	0	0	0	0	0	2 (Note: Appearance(s) in Copa Libertadores)	0	1 (Note: Appearance in Recopa Gaúcha)	0	7	0
Grêmio	2021	Série A	23	0	12	0	2	0	8 (Note: Two appearances in Copa Libertadores, six appearances in Copa Sudamericana)	0	0	0	45	0
Grêmio	Total		29	0	13	0	2	0	10	0	1	0	55	0
Sassuolo	2021–22	Serie A	10	0	—		2	0	—		—		12	0
Sassuolo	2022–23	Serie A	23	0	—		0	0	—		—		23	0
Sassuolo	2023–24	Serie A	26	0	—		3	0	—		—		29	0
Sassuolo	Total		59	0	—		5	0	—		—		64	0
São Paulo	2024	Série A	8	0	—		0	0	0	0	—		8	0
São Paulo	2025	Série A	5	0	3	0	2	0	5	0	—		15	0
São Paulo	Total		13	0	3	0	2	0	5	0	—		23	0
Atlético Mineiro	2025	Série A	11	1	—		—		3 (Note: Appearance(s) in Copa Sudamericana)	0	—		14	1
Atlético Mineiro	2026	Série A	20	2	9	1	5	0	6	0	—		40	3
Atlético Mineiro	Total		31	3	9	1	5	0	9	0	—		54	4
Career total			112	1	16	0	9	0	18	0	1	0	155	1

== Honours ==
Grêmio

- Recopa Sudamericana: 2018
- Campeonato Gaúcho: 2018, 2021
