= Guilherme Azevedo =

Brazilian footballer (born 2001)

Personal information
- Full name: Guilherme da Silva Azevedo
- Date of birth: 21 May 2001 (age 25)
- Place of birth: Apucarana, Brazil
- Height: 1.79 m (5 ft 10 in)
- Position: Forward

Team information
- Current team: São João de Ver

Youth career
- 2011–2019: Grêmio

Senior career*
Years	Team	Apps	(Gls)
2019–2024	Grêmio	19	(2)
2021	→ Coritiba (loan)	14	(0)
2022	→ Criciúma (loan)	2	(0)
2023	→ Ypiranga (loan)	2	(0)
2024	Operário	3	(0)
2025–2026	Luverdense	9	(0)
2026	Batel		
2026–	São João de Ver	0	(0)
- * Club domestic league appearances and goals as of 22 February 2026

Guilherme da Silva Azevedo (born 21 May 2001) is a Brazilian professional footballer who plays as a right winger for Portuguese Liga 3 club São João de Ver.

== Professional career ==
Azevedo joined the youth academy of Grêmio in 2011, and signed a professional contract with them on 22 May 2019. Azevedo made his professional debut with Grêmio in a 2-1 Campeonato Brasileiro Série A loss to Fluminense FC on 29 September 2019.

== Honours ==
Grêmio

- Campeonato Gaúcho: 2021
- Recopa Gaúcha: 2021
