= Léo Pereira (footballer, born 2000) =

Brazilian footballer (born 2000)

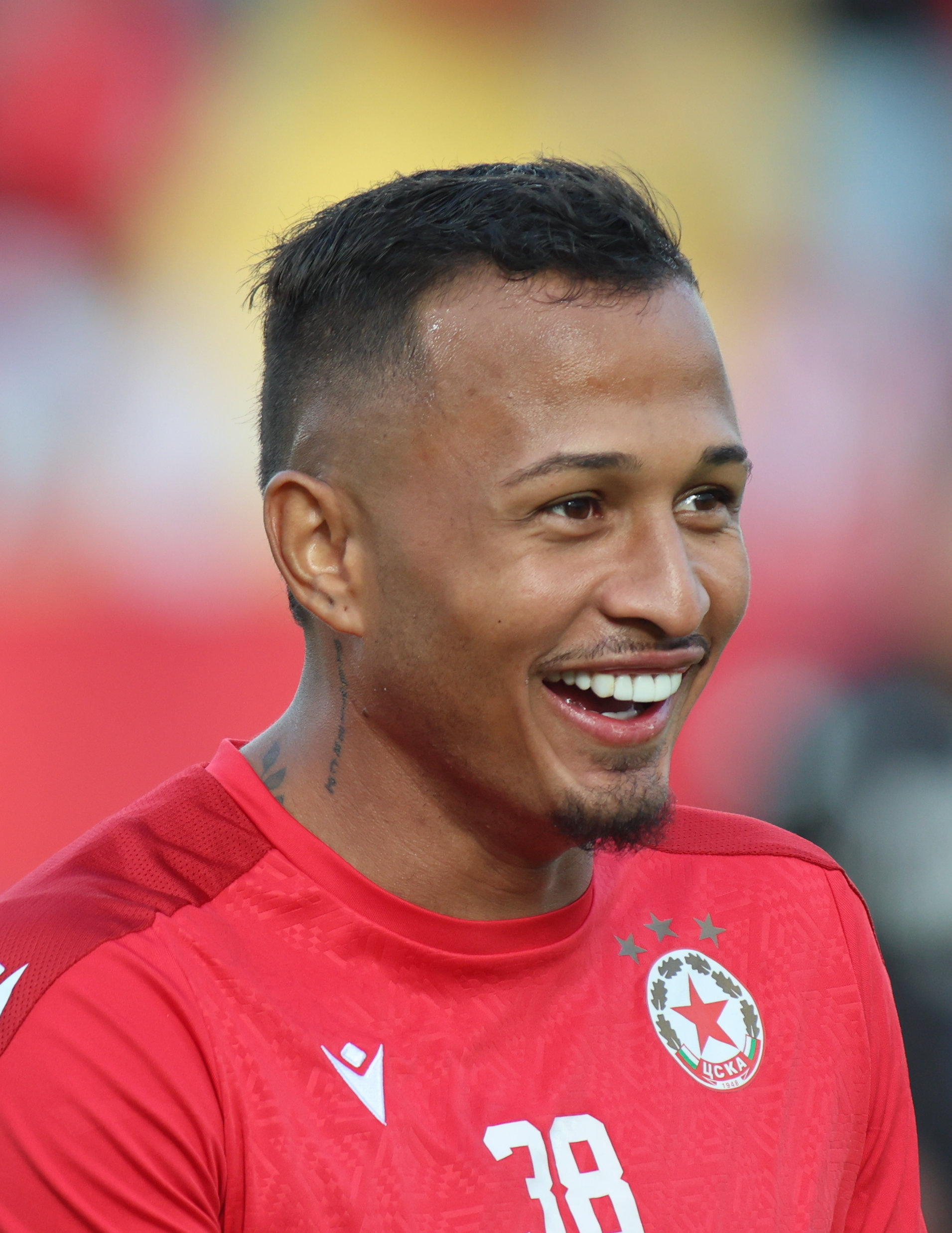

Personal information
- Full name: Leonardo Augusto dos Santos Pereira
- Date of birth: 29 June 2000 (age 26)
- Place of birth: Bauru, Brazil
- Height: 1.72 m (5 ft 8 in)
- Position: Winger

Team information
- Current team: CSKA Sofia
- Number: 38

Youth career
- Ituano
- 2019–2020: → Corinthians

Senior career*
Years	Team	Apps	(Gls)
2018–2022	Ituano	4	(0)
2021	→ Grêmio (loan)	25	(2)
2022–2024	Atlético Goianiense	49	(3)
2023	→ Marítimo (loan)	10	(0)
2023–2024	→ CRB (loan)	22	(4)
2024–2026	CRB	41	(6)
2025	→ Vitória (loan)	6	(0)
2025	→ Sport Recife (loan)	16	(3)
2026–	CSKA Sofia	24	(3)
- * Club domestic league appearances and goals as of 19:12, 11 October 2026 (UTC)

Leonardo Augusto dos Santos Pereira (born 29 June 2000), commonly known as Léo Pereira, is a Brazilian professional footballer who plays as a winger for Bulgarian First League club CSKA Sofia.

== Club career ==
=== Grêmio ===
Born in Bauru, Brazil, Léo Pereira joined the Grêmio's Academy at the age of 20 in 2020 on loan from Ituano.

== Career statistics ==
=== Club ===
As of 18 October 2026

Appearances and goals by club, season and competition
Club	Season	League			State League		National Cup		Continental		Other		Total	
Club	Season	Division	Apps	Goals	Apps	Goals	Apps	Goals	Apps	Goals	Apps	Goals	Apps	Goals
Ituano	2018	Paulista	—		0	0	0	0	—		1 (Note: Appearance(s) in Copa Paulista.)	0	1	0
Ituano	2019	Série D	3	0	0	0	—		—		—		3	0
Ituano	2020	Série C	1	0	0	0	—		—		—		1	0
Ituano	2021	Série C	0	0	0	0	—		—		—		0	0
Ituano	Total		4	0	0	0	0	0	—		1	0	5	0
Corinthians (loan)	2019	Série A	0	0	—		—		—		—		0	0
Corinthians (loan)	2020	Série A	0	0	0	0	0	0	—		—		0	0
Corinthians (loan)	Total		0	0	0	0	0	0	—		—		0	0
Grêmio (loan)	2021	Série A	16	0	10 (Note: Appearance(s) in Campeonato Gaúcho.)	2	4	1	6 (Note: One appearances in Copa Libertadores, five appearances and two goals in Copa Sudamericana.)	2	—		36	5
Atlético Goianiense	2022	Série A	30	1	16 (Note: Appearance(s) in Campeonato Goiano.)	2	8	1	12 (Note: Appearances Copa Sudamericana.)	1	—		66	5
Atlético Goianiense	2023	Série B	3	0	0	0	0	0	0	0	—		3	0
Atlético Goianiense	Total		33	1	16	2	4	1	6	2	0	0	69	5
Marítimo (loan)	2022–23	Liga Portugal 2	10	0	—		0	0	—		—		10	0
CRB (loan)	2023	Série B	22	4	—		0	0	—		—		22	4
CRB	2024	Série B	34	4	7 (Note: Appearance(s) in Campeonato Alagoano.)	2	6	1	—		11 (Note: Appearance(s) in Copa do Nordeste.)	2	58	9
CRB	2025	Série B	0	0	9	0	0	0	—		6	1	15	1
CRB	Total		56	8	16	2	6	1	0	0	16	3	95	14
Vitória (loan)	2025	Série A	6	0	—		0	0	3	0	1	0	10	0
Sport Recife (loan)	2025	Série A	16	3	—		0	0	—		—		16	3
CSKA Sofia	2025–26	First League	15	2	–		4	0	–		–		19	2
CSKA Sofia	2026–27	First League	9	1	–		1	0	4	0	0	0	14	1
CSKA Sofia	Total		24	3	0	0	5	0	4	0	0	0	33	3
Career total			166	15	42	6	23	3	25	3	19	3	275	30

== Honours ==
Grêmio

- Campeonato Gaúcho: 2021
- Recopa Gaúcha: 2021

Atlético Goianiense

- Campeonato Goiano: 2022
