= Thiago Santos (footballer, born 1989) =

Brazilian footballer

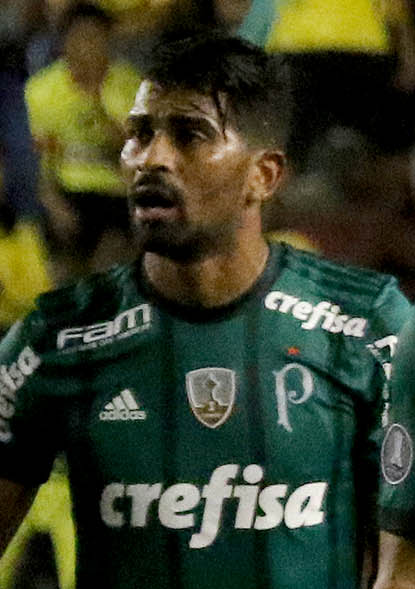

Personal information
- Full name: Thiago dos Santos
- Date of birth: 5 September 1989 (age 37)
- Place of birth: Curitiba, Brazil
- Height: 1.81 m (5 ft 11 in)
- Position: Defensive midfielder

Team information
- Current team: Coritiba
- Number: 21

Senior career*
Years	Team	Apps	(Gls)
2008–2010	Serrano Centro-Sul		
2011	URT		
2011	→ Serrano Centro-Sul (loan)		
2012–2013	Nacional-MG	30	(1)
2013	Araxá	2	(0)
2013	Ipatinga	14	(0)
2014	Linense	14	(0)
2014–2015	América Mineiro	48	(4)
2015–2019	Palmeiras	141	(5)
2020	FC Dallas	20	(0)
2021–2023	Grêmio	70	(5)
2023–2025	Fluminense	62	(0)
2026–	Coritiba	9	(0)
- * Club domestic league appearances and goals as of 7 April 2026

Thiago dos Santos (born 5 September 1989), known as Thiago Santos, is a Brazilian footballer who plays as a defensive midfielder for Coritiba.

== Career statistics ==
As of 24 November 2021

Appearances and goals by club, season and competition
Club	Season	League			State League		National cup		Continental		Other		Total	
Club	Season	Division	Apps	Goals	Apps	Goals	Apps	Goals	Apps	Goals	Apps	Goals	Apps	Goals
Nacional-MG	2012	Série D	10	1	9 (Note: Appearance(s) in Campeonato Mineiro)	0	—		—		—		19	1
Nacional-MG	2013	Mineiro	—		11	0	—		—		—		11	0
Nacional-MG	Total		10	1	20	0	0	0	0	0	0	0	30	1
Araxá	2013	Série D	2	0	—		—		—		—		2	0
Ipatinga	2013	Série C	14	0	—		—		—		—		14	0
Linense	2014	Paulista	—		14 (Note: Appearance(s) in Campeonato Paulista)	0	—		—		—		14	0
América Mineiro	2014	Série B	22	1	—		2	0	—		—		24	1
América Mineiro	2015	Série B	16	3	10	0	3	0	—		—		29	3
América Mineiro	Total		38	4	10	0	5	0	0	0	0	0	53	4
Palmeiras	2015	Série A	13	0	—		—		—		—		13	0
Palmeiras	2016	Série A	25	1	10	0	1	0	3 (Note: Appearance(s) in Copa Libertadores)	0	—		39	1
Palmeiras	2017	Série A	25	0	8	0	3	1	6	0	—		42	1
Palmeiras	2018	Série A	23	1	10	2	4	0	8	0	—		45	3
Palmeiras	2019	Série A	18	1	9	0	2	0	5	0	—		34	1
Palmeiras	Total		104	3	37	2	10	1	22	0	0	0	173	6
FC Dallas	2020	MLS	20	0	—		—		—		2 (Note: Appearance(s) in MLS Cup Playoffs)	0	22	0
Grêmio	2021	Série A	23	2	6	0	4	0	4 (Note: Appearance(s) in Copa Sudamericana)	0	—		37	2
Career total			211	10	87	2	19	1	26	0	2	0	345	13

== Honours ==
Palmeiras

- Campeonato Brasileiro Série A: 2016, 2018

Grêmio

- Campeonato Gaúcho: 2021, 2022, 2023
- Recopa Gaúcha: 2021, 2022, 2023

Fluminense

- Copa Libertadores: 2023
- Recopa Sudamericana: 2024
