= Lucas Araújo =

Brazilian footballer (born 1999)

Personal information
- Full name: Lucas Araújo de Oliveira
- Date of birth: 21 May 1999 (age 27)
- Place of birth: Fortaleza, Brazil
- Height: 1.78 m (5 ft 10 in)
- Position: Midfielder

Team information
- Current team: Botev Plovdiv
- Number: 77

Youth career
- 2012–2020: Grêmio

Senior career*
Years	Team	Apps	(Gls)
2020–2021	Grêmio	8	(1)
2021–2023	Bahia	24	(1)
2022	→ Sampaio Corrêa (loan)	34	(2)
2023–2025	Guarani	44	(0)
2025	Portimonense	7	(0)
2025–	Botev Plovdiv	20	(1)
- * Club domestic league appearances and goals as of 11 June 2026

Lucas Araújo de Oliveira (born 21 May 1999), known as Lucas Araújo, is a Brazilian professional footballer who plays as a midfielder for Bulgarian First League club Botev Plovdiv.

== Professional career ==
Lucas Araújo joined the youth academy of Grêmio in 2012. He made his professional debut with Grêmio in a 1-0 Campeonato Gaúcho win over Pelotas on 8 March 2020.

On 7 April 2021, Lucas Araújo signed a contract with fellow Série A side Bahia until December 2023.

On 29 September 2025, Lucas Araújo joined Botev Plovdiv in Bulgaria.

== Honours ==
Grêmio

- Campeonato Gaúcho: 2020

Bahia

- Copa do Nordeste: 2021

Sampaio Corrêa

- Campeonato Maranhense: 2022
