= Matheus Cavichioli =

Brazilian footballer

Personal information
- Full name: Matheus Fernando Cavichioli
- Date of birth: 27 July 1986 (age 40)
- Place of birth: Caçador, Brazil
- Height: 1.92 m (6 ft 4 in)
- Position: Goalkeeper

Team information
- Current team: Marcilio Dias

Youth career
- 2004–2006: Grêmio

Senior career*
| Years | Team | Apps | (Gls) |
| 2006–2010 | Grêmio | 0 | (0) |
| 2007 | → Figueirense (loan) | 1 | (0) |
| 2009 | → Caxias (loan) | 0 | (0) |
| 2010 | → São José-SP (loan) | 19 | (0) |
| 2010–2011 | → Caxias (loan) | 13 | (0) |
| 2011 | Novo Hamburgo | 0 | (0) |
| 2012–2013 | Sport Recife | 1 | (0) |
| 2014 | Lajeadense | 0 | (0) |
| 2014 | Pelotas | 7 | (0) |
| 2015 | Veranópolis | 15 | (0) |
| 2015 | Brasil de Farroupilha | 9 | (0) |
| 2016 | Passo Fundo | 13 | (0) |
| 2016 | Inter de Santa Maria | 4 | (0) |
| 2016–2017 | Novo Hamburgo | 22 | (0) |
| 2017–2018 | Juventude | 65 | (0) |
| 2019 | Oeste | 25 | (0) |
| 2020 | Guarani | 0 | (0) |
| 2020–2023 | América Mineiro | 132 | (0) |
| 2024 | Água Santa | 1 | (0) |
| 2024 | Chapecoense | 20 | (0) |
| 2025– | Ferroviário | 0 | (0) |
- * Club domestic league appearances and goals as of 26 April 2024

Matheus Fernando Cavichioli (born 27 July 1986 in Caçador, Santa Catarina) is a Brazilian footballer who plays as goalkeeper for Ferroviário.

== Career ==
=== Club career ===
Matheus Cavichioli started his career on Grêmio as youth player. In 2007, he agreed a loan deal with Figueirense, but was released after played just once on the Campeonato Catarinense, a 2-1 loss against Atlético Ibirama. He was loaned again, this time to Pão de Açúcar, who plays in the lower divisions of Campeonato Paulista. In January 2008, he returned to Grêmio as the third choice goalkeeper. In 2009, Matheus was loaned to Série C side Caxias.
