= 2019 Campeonato Gaúcho =

Campeonato Gaúcho
- Season: 2019
- Champions: Grêmio (38th title)
- Relegated: Avenida; Veranópolis
- Copa do Brasil: Grêmio; Internacional; Caxias
- Série D: Caxias; São Luiz
- Matches played: 80
- Goals scored: 179 (2.24 per match)
- Top goalscorer: Rafael Gava; Marcão (6 goals)
- Biggest home win: Grêmio 6–0 Avenida (11 February 2019)
- Biggest away win: Juventude 0–6 Grêmio (25 March 2019)
- Highest scoring: Grêmio 6–0 Avenida (11 February 2019); Aimoré 4–2 Novo Hamburgo (25 February 2019); Veranópolis ECRC 3–3 Brasil de Pelotas (21 March 2019); Juventude 0–6 Grêmio (25 March 2019)
- Longest winning run: 5 games Grêmio; Internacional
- Longest unbeaten run: 17 games Grêmio
- Longest winless run: 11 games Veranópolis ECRC
- Longest losing run: 6 games Avenida
- Highest attendance: 47,759; Grêmio 0–0 Internacional (18 April 2019)
- Lowest attendance: 160; São José 2–2 Caxias (21 March 2019)
- Total attendance: 445,233
- Average attendance: 5,565

The 2019 Campeonato da Primeira Divisão de Futebol Profissional da FGF (2019 FGF First Division Professional Football Championship), better known as the 2019 Campeonato Gaúcho or Gaúcho, was the 99th edition of the top flight football league of the Brazilian state of Rio Grande do Sul. The season began on 20 January and ended on 21 April.

The 12 clubs contested in the Campeonato Gaúcho (Championship A1 Series) in a first phase single round-robin and two-legged knockout bracket in the final. Grêmio successfully defended in the final its 36th championship title to add the 2019 championship to its cache over Taça Centenário champions Brasil de Pelotas. VAR use would debut in the tournament's history for both legs of the final and any Grenal matches that take place.

== Format ==
The Gauchão was contested between 12 teams in the first phase a single round-robin, who first played in a single round-robin. The 8 top ranked teams qualified for the final stage, a two-legged knockout bracket, and the 2 bottom ranked teams were relegated to the Série A2. Three places were available in the 2020 Copa do Brasil, while either one or two places would be available in the 2020 Série D, depending on the decision of the CBF to reduce the number of participant clubs from 68 to 40. A new distinction called the Campeonato do Interior Gaúcho, was awarded to the best-placing team outside the final. Grêmio and Internacional are automatically eliminated from being eligible for the award.

== Participating teams ==
Club	Home city	2018 result
Aimoré	São Leopoldo	2nd (A2)
Avenida	Santa Cruz do Sul	4th
Brasil de Pelotas	Pelotas	2nd
Caxias	Caxias do Sul	5th
Grêmio	Porto Alegre	1st
Internacional	Porto Alegre	6th
Juventude	Caxias do Sul	9th
Novo Hamburgo	Novo Hamburgo	10th
Pelotas	Pelotas	1st (A2)
São José	Porto Alegre	3rd
São Luiz	Ijuí	8th
Veranópolis	Veranópolis	7th

== First phase ==
Pos	Team	Pld	W	D	L	GF	GA	GD	Pts	Qualification or relegation
1	Grêmio	11	9	2	0	29	1	+28	29	Advance to Final phase
2	Internacional	11	7	1	3	13	8	+5	22	Advance to Final phase
3	Caxias	11	6	2	3	18	10	+8	20	Advance to Final phase
4	São Luiz	11	5	2	4	14	13	+1	17	Advance to Final phase
5	São José	11	5	1	5	14	15	−1	16	Advance to Final phase
6	Aimoré	11	4	3	4	12	15	−3	15	Advance to Final phase
7	Novo Hamburgo	11	4	3	4	11	15	−4	15	Advance to Final phase
8	Juventude	11	4	2	5	10	15	−5	14	Advance to Final phase
9	Pelotas	11	3	3	5	8	10	−2	12	
10	Brasil de Pelotas	11	2	5	4	13	19	−6	11	
11	Avenida	11	1	3	7	6	20	−14	6	Relegation to 2019 Campeonato Gaúcho Série B
12	Veranópolis	11	0	5	6	8	15	−7	5	Relegation to 2019 Campeonato Gaúcho Série B

Updated to match(es) played on 20 March 2019. Source: Standings
Rules for classification: 1) Points; 2) Wins; 3) Goal difference; 4) Goals scored; 5) Head-to-head; 6) Disciplinary record.

== Final phase ==
=== Bracket ===
Quarter-finals
Grêmio	6	0	6
Juventude	0	0	0
São Luiz	0	2	2
São José	0	1	1
Internacional	2	0	2
Novo Hamburgo	0	1	1
Caxias	1	1	2
Aimoré	1	0	1

Semi-finals
Grêmio	0	3	3
São Luiz	0	0	0
Internacional	2	2	4
Caxias	1	0	1

Final
Grêmio	0	0	0 (3)
Internacional	0	0	0 (2)

=== Final ===
14 April 2019
16:00 BRT

Internacional (Porto Alegre)	0–0	(Porto Alegre) Grêmio

Estádio Beira-Rio, Porto Alegre
Referee: Leandro Pedro Vuaden

17 April 2019
21:30 BRT

Grêmio (Porto Alegre)	0–0	(Porto Alegre) Internacional
Penalties
Diego Tardelli (penalty scored); Everton (penalty missed); Matheus Henrique (penalty scored); Michel (penalty missed); André (penalty scored)	3–2	(penalty missed) Camilo; (penalty scored) Rafael Sóbis; (penalty scored) Paolo Guerrero; (penalty missed) Víctor Cuesta; (penalty missed) Nico López

Arena do Grêmio, Porto Alegre

== General table ==
Pos	Team	Pld	W	D	L	GF	GA	GD	Pts	Qualification or relegation
1	Grêmio	17	12	5	0	38	1	+37	41	2020 Copa do Brasil
2	Internacional	17	9	4	4	19	10	+9	31	2020 Copa do Brasil
3	Caxias	15	7	3	5	21	15	+6	24	2020 Copa do Brasil, 2020 Série D and Campeão do Interior
4	São Luiz	15	6	4	5	16	17	−1	22	2020 Série D
5	Novo Hamburgo	13	5	3	5	12	17	−5	18	Eliminated in quarterfinals
6	São José	13	5	2	6	15	17	−2	17	Eliminated in quarterfinals
7	Aimoré	13	4	4	5	13	17	−4	16	Eliminated in quarterfinals
8	Juventude	13	4	3	6	10	21	−11	15	Eliminated in quarterfinals
9	Pelotas	11	3	3	5	8	10	−2	12	
10	Brasil de Pelotas	11	2	5	4	13	19	−6	11	
11	Avenida (R)	11	1	3	7	6	20	−14	6	Relegation to 2020 Campeonato Gaúcho Série A2
12	Veranópolis (R)	11	0	5	6	8	15	−7	5	Relegation to 2020 Campeonato Gaúcho Série A2

Updated to match(es) played on 28 March 2019. Source: Standings
Rules for classification: 1) Points; 2) Head-to-Head; 3) Goal difference; 4) Goals scored
(R) Relegated

== Goals ==
Rank	Player	Club	Goals
1	(Brazil) Rafael Gava	Caxias	6
1	(Brazil) Marcão	São Luiz	6
3	(Brazil) Luan Vieira	Grêmio	5
4	(Brazil) Marinho	Grêmio	4
4	(Brazil) Michel	Brasil de Pelotas	4
4	(Brazil) Everton	Grêmio	4
4	(Brazil) Pepê	Grêmio	4
4	(Paraguay) Héctor Bustamante	Novo Hamburgo	4
4	(Brazil) Vinicius	Aimoré	4
10	(Brazil) Raphael Macena	Veranópolis ECRC	3
