= 2018 Campeonato Gaúcho =

Campeonato Gaúcho
- Season: 2018
- Champions: Grêmio (37th title)
- Relegated: Cruzeiro; São Paulo
- Copa do Brasil: Brasil de Pelotas; Grêmio; São José
- Top goalscorer: Michel (8 goals)
- Best goalkeeper: Matheus Cavichioli

The 2018 Campeonato da Primeira Divisão de Futebol Profissional da FGF (2018 FGF First Division Professional Football Championship), better known as the 2015 Campeonato Gaúcho or Gaúcho, was the 97th edition of the top flight football league of the Brazilian state of Rio Grande do Sul. The season began in January and ended in April.

== Participating teams ==
Club	Home city
Avenida	Santa Cruz do Sul
Brasil de Pelotas	Pelotas
Caxias	Caxias do Sul
Cruzeiro	Porto Alegre
Grêmio	Porto Alegre
Internacional	Porto Alegre
Juventude	Caxias do Sul
Novo Hamburgo	Novo Hamburgo
São José-PA	Porto Alegre
São Luiz	Ijuí
São Paulo	Rio Grande
Veranópolis	Veranópolis

== Table ==
Pos	Team	Pld	W	D	L	GF	GA	GD	Pts	Qualification or relegation
1	Brasil de Pelotas	11	6	3	2	13	7	+6	21	Advance to Play-offs
2	Caxias	11	5	5	1	16	9	+7	20	Advance to Play-offs
3	Internacional	11	5	3	3	16	6	+10	18	Advance to Play-offs
4	São José-PA	11	5	2	4	13	16	−3	17	Advance to Play-offs
5	Veranópolis	11	4	5	2	9	5	+4	17	Advance to Play-offs
6	Grêmio	11	5	1	5	17	16	+1	16	Advance to Play-offs
7	Avenida	11	3	6	2	11	12	−1	15	Advance to Play-offs
8	São Luiz	11	3	5	3	12	10	+2	14	Advance to Play-offs
9	Juventude	11	3	4	4	14	17	−3	13	
10	Novo Hamburgo	11	2	4	5	8	17	−9	10	
11	Cruzeiro	11	2	3	6	7	13	−6	9	Relegation to 2019 Campeonato Gaúcho Série B
12	São Paulo	11	1	3	7	4	12	−8	6	Relegation to 2019 Campeonato Gaúcho Série B

First match(es) will be played: unknown. Source: Standings
Rules for classification: 1) Points; 2) Head-to-Head; 3) Goal difference; 40) Goals scored

== Knockout stage ==
=== Bracket ===
Quarter-finals
São Luiz	1	1	2
Brasil de Pelotas	1	2	3
Veranópolis	1	0	1
São José-PA	0	2	2
Avenida (a)	1	2	3
Caxias	1	2	3
Grêmio	3	0	3
Internacional	0	2	2

Semi-finals
Brasil de Pelotas	1	2	3
São José-PA	1	1	2
Avenida	0	1	1
Grêmio	3	1	4

Final
Brasil de Pelotas	0	0	0
Grêmio	4	3	7

=== Final ===
1 April 2018
16:00 BRT

Grêmio (Porto Alegre)	4–0	Brasil de Pelotas
Éverton 46', 70'; Alisson 55'; Ramiro 77'	Report

Arena do Grêmio, Porto Alegre
Attendance: 29,891
Referee: Anderson Daronco (Rio Grande do Sul)

8 April 2018
16:00 BRT

Brasil de Pelotas	0–3	(Porto Alegre) Grêmio
	Report	Cícero 81'; Alisson 85'; Léo Moura 90'

Estádio Bento Freitas, Pelotas
Attendance: 8,156
Referee: Leandro Vuaden (Rio Grande do Sul)

== Goals ==
No.	Player	Club	Goals
1	(Brazil) Michel	São Luiz	8
2	(Brazil) Guilherme Queiróz	Juventude	6
3	(Brazil) Éverton Alemão	São José-PA	5
4	(Brazil) William Pottker	Internacional	4
4	(Brazil) Luan	Grêmio	4
6	(Brazil) Luiz Eduardo	Brasil de Pelotas	3
6	(Brazil) Kayron	Cruzeiro	3
6	(Brazil) João Paulo	Caxias	3
6	(Brazil) Laércio	Caxias	3

== Awards ==
=== Team of the year ===
Manager: Beto Campos

Pos.	Player	Club
GK	(Brazil) Matheus Cavichioli	Novo Hamburgo
DF	(Brazil) John Lennon	Cruzeiro
DF	(Brazil) Júlio Santos	Novo Hamburgo
DF	(Brazil) Pedro Geromel	Grêmio
DF	(Brazil) Sander	Cruzeiro
MF	(Brazil) Rodrigo Dourado	Internacional
MF	(Brazil) Jardel	Novo Hamburgo
MF	(Brazil) Preto	Novo Hamburgo
MF	(Argentina) Andrés D'Alessandro	Internacional
FW	(Ecuador) Miller Bolaños	Grêmio
FW	(Argentina) Nico López	Internacional

Source Informativo
Last updated: 14 May 2017

Player of the Season

The Player of the Year was awarded to Matheus.

Newcomer of the Season

The Newcomer of the Year was awarded to Sander.
