= 2021 Recopa Gaúcha =

- Event: Recopa Gaúcha
| Grêmio | Santa Cruz-RS |
| Campeonato Gaúcho | Copa FGF |
| 3 | 0 |
- Date: 6 June 2021
- Venue: Arena do Grêmio, Porto Alegre
- Referee: Érico Carvalho
- Attendance: 0 (Note: The match will be played behind closed doors.)
- Weather: Cloudy; 16 °C (61 °F); 94% humidity

The 2021 Recopa Gaúcha was 8th season of an annual football match contested by the winners of the Campeonato Gaúcho and the Copa FGF in the previous season. The competition is considered a super cup of football in Rio Grande do Sul, being organized by FGF. The match is usually played in January or February prior to the start of the Campeonato Gaúcho. However, due to postponement of the 2021 Campeonato Gaúcho as a result of the COVID-19 pandemic, the match will be held only in June, after the start of the season.

The current holders are Grêmio, and they will be able to defend his title by winning the 2020 Campeonato Gaúcho. The opponent will be Santa Cruz-RS, who was champion of the 2020 Copa FGF.

== Teams ==
| Club | City | Stadium | Capacity | Qualification | Titles | First title | Last title | First appearance | Total appearances | Last appearance |
|---|---|---|---|---|---|---|---|---|---|---|
| Grêmio | Porto Alegre | Arena do Grêmio | 55,225 | 2020 Campeonato Gaúcho champions | 1 | 2019 | 2019 | 2019 | 2 | 2020 |
| Santa Cruz-RS | Santa Cruz do Sul | Estádio dos Plátanos | 2,490 | 2020 Copa FGF champions | — | — | — | — | — | — |
