= 2020 Campeonato Gaúcho =

Campeonato Gaúcho
- Season: 2020
- Champions: Caxias (Taça Cel. Ewaldo Poeta); Grêmio (Taça Francisco Novelletto Neto)
- Matches played: 32
- Goals scored: 65 (2.03 per match)
- Top goalscorer: Michel (4)

The 2020 Campeonato da Primeira Divisão de Futebol Profissional da FGF, better known as the 2020 Campeonato Gaúcho, was the 100th season of Rio Grande do Sul's top flight football league. The season began on 22 January and was scheduled to end on 26 April. However, due to the COVID-19 outbreak, the season was paused until 22 July 2020 and ended on 30 August.

== Format ==
The Gauchão was contested between 12 teams, who were split into two six team groups.

== Taça Cel. Ewaldo Poeta ==
=== Group stage ===
==== Group A ====
| Pos | Team | Pld | W | D | L | GF | GA | GD | Pts | Qualification | INT | YPI | JUV | SLU | PEL | NVH |
|---|---|---|---|---|---|---|---|---|---|---|---|---|---|---|---|---|
| 1 | Internacional | 5 | 4 | 1 | 0 | 10 | 4 | +6 | 13 | Advance to Semi-finals | — | — | — | — | 3–1 | 2–0 |
| 2 | Ypiranga | 5 | 3 | 2 | 0 | 4 | 1 | +3 | 11 | Advance to Semi-finals | 0–0 | — | — | 1–0 | 2–1 | — |
| 3 | Juventude | 5 | 1 | 2 | 2 | 4 | 5 | −1 | 5 | | 0–1 | 0–0 | — | — | — | 0–0 |
| 4 | São Luiz | 5 | 1 | 1 | 3 | 8 | 10 | −2 | 4 | | 3–4 | — | 1–3 | — | 4–2 | — |
| 5 | Pelotas | 5 | 1 | 1 | 3 | 7 | 10 | −3 | 4 | | — | — | 3–1 | — | — | 0–0 |
| 6 | Novo Hamburgo | 5 | 0 | 3 | 2 | 0 | 3 | −3 | 3 | | — | 0–1 | — | 0–0 | — | — |

Source: FGF, Flashscore
Rules for classification: 1) Points; 2) Wins; 3) Goal difference; 4) Goals scored; 5) Head-to-head; 6) Disciplinary record.

==== Group B ====
| Pos | Team | Pld | W | D | L | GF | GA | GD | Pts | Qualification | CAX | GRE | ESP | AIM | SJO | BDP |
|---|---|---|---|---|---|---|---|---|---|---|---|---|---|---|---|---|
| 1 | Caxias | 5 | 3 | 1 | 1 | 5 | 2 | +3 | 10 | Advance to Semi-finals | — | — | — | — | 1–1 | 1–0 |
| 2 | Grêmio | 5 | 3 | 0 | 2 | 9 | 5 | +4 | 9 | Advance to Semi-finals | 0–2 | — | 5–0 | — | 2–1 | — |
| 3 | Esportivo | 5 | 2 | 2 | 1 | 6 | 9 | −3 | 8 | | 1–0 | — | — | 4–3 | — | — |
| 4 | Aimoré | 5 | 2 | 0 | 3 | 6 | 8 | −2 | 6 | | 0–1 | 2–1 | — | — | — | 1–0 |
| 5 | São José | 5 | 1 | 2 | 2 | 5 | 5 | 0 | 5 | | — | — | 1–1 | 2–0 | — | — |
| 6 | Brasil de Pelotas | 5 | 1 | 1 | 3 | 1 | 3 | −2 | 4 | | — | 0–1 | 0–0 | — | 1–0 | — |

Source: FGF, Flashscore
Rules for classification: 1) Points; 2) Wins; 3) Goal difference; 4) Goals scored; 5) Head-to-head; 6) Disciplinary record.

=== Knockout stage ===
Semi-final
B1 | Caxias | 1
A2 | Ypiranga | 0
A1 | Internacional | 0
B2 | Grêmio | 1

Final
B1 | Caxias | 1
B2 | Grêmio | 0

==== Semi-finals ====
15 February 2020
16:30 UTC−03:00

| Internacional | 0–1 | Grêmio |
|---|---|---|
| | Report | Diego Souza 90'+1' |

Estádio Beira-Rio, Porto Alegre
Referee: Jean Pierre Goncalves Lima

16 February 2020
16:00 UTC−03:00

| Caxias | 1–0 | Ypiranga |
|---|---|---|
| da Silva 90'+1' | Report |

Estádio Centenário, Caxias do Sul
Referee: Lucas Guimarães Rechatiko Horn

==== Final ====
22 February 2020
16:30 UTC−03:00

| Caxias | 1–0 | Grêmio |
|---|---|---|
| Diogo Oliveira 80' | Report |

Estádio Centenário, Caxias do Sul
Referee: Leandro Vuaden

== Taça Francisco Novelletto Neto ==
=== Group stage ===
==== Group A ====
| Pos | Team | Pld | W | D | L | GF | GA | GD | Pts | Qualification |
|---|---|---|---|---|---|---|---|---|---|---|
| 1 | Internacional | 6 | 3 | 2 | 1 | 10 | 4 | +6 | 11 | Advance to Final phase |
| 2 | Novo Hamburgo | 6 | 2 | 2 | 2 | 5 | 5 | 0 | 8 | Advance to Final phase |
| 3 | Juventude | 6 | 2 | 1 | 3 | 5 | 7 | −2 | 7 | |
| 4 | São Luiz | 6 | 1 | 1 | 4 | 4 | 7 | −3 | 4 | |
| 5 | Pelotas | 6 | 1 | 1 | 4 | 4 | 8 | −4 | 4 | |
| 6 | Ypiranga | 6 | 0 | 4 | 2 | 6 | 11 | −5 | 4 | |

Updated to match(es) played on 1 August 2020. Source: FGF, Flashscore
Rules for classification: 1) Points; 2) Wins; 3) Goal difference; 4) Goals scored; 5) Head-to-head; 6) Disciplinary record.

==== Group B ====
| Pos | Team | Pld | W | D | L | GF | GA | GD | Pts | Qualification |
|---|---|---|---|---|---|---|---|---|---|---|
| 1 | Grêmio | 6 | 4 | 2 | 0 | 9 | 3 | +6 | 14 | Advance to Final phase |
| 2 | Esportivo | 6 | 3 | 2 | 1 | 10 | 8 | +2 | 11 | Advance to Final phase |
| 3 | Caxias | 6 | 3 | 2 | 1 | 7 | 5 | +2 | 11 | |
| 4 | São José | 6 | 3 | 0 | 3 | 4 | 6 | −2 | 9 | |
| 5 | Aimoré | 6 | 1 | 4 | 1 | 7 | 5 | +2 | 7 | |
| 6 | Brasil de Pelotas | 6 | 2 | 1 | 3 | 5 | 7 | −2 | 7 | |

Updated to match(es) played on 1 August 2020. Source: FGF, Flashscore
Rules for classification: 1) Points; 2) Wins; 3) Goal difference; 4) Goals scored; 5) Head-to-head; 6) Disciplinary record.

==== Results ====
| Home \ Away | INT | JUV | NVH | PEL | SLU | YPI | AIM | BDP | CAX | ESP | GRE | SJO |
|---|---|---|---|---|---|---|---|---|---|---|---|---|
| Internacional | | — | — | — | — | — | 2–0 | 2–0 | — | — | 0–1 | — |
| Juventude | — | | — | — | — | — | — | — | 2–0 | 2–3 | — | 0–1 |
| Novo Hamburgo | — | — | | — | — | — | 1–1 | — | — | 2–1 | 0–0 | — |
| Pelotas | — | — | — | | — | — | — | 2–1 | — | — | 0–1 | 0–1 |
| São Luiz | — | — | — | — | | — | — | 0–1 | 1–2 | — | — | 1–0 |
| Ypiranga | — | — | — | — | — | | 1–5 | — | 0–0 | 2–2 | — | — |
| Aimoré | — | 0–0 | — | 1–1 | 0–0 | — | | — | — | — | — | — |
| Brasil de Pelotas | — | 0–1 | 1–0 | — | — | 2–2 | — | | — | — | — | — |
| Caxias | 1–1 | — | 2–1 | 2–0 | — | — | — | — | | — | — | — |
| Esportivo | 1–1 | — | — | 2–1 | 1–0 | — | — | — | — | | — | — |
| Grêmio | — | 3–0 | — | — | 3–2 | 1–1 | — | — | — | — | | — |
| São José | 1–4 | — | 0–1 | — | — | 1–0 | — | — | — | — | — | |

Updated to match(es) played on 1 August 2020. Source: FGF
Legend: Blue = home team win; Yellow = draw; Red = away team win.

=== Playoff ===
Semi-final
B1 | Grêmio | 4
A2 | Novo Hamburgo | 3
A1 | Internacional | 4
B2 | Esportivo | 0

Final
B1 | Grêmio | 2
A1 | Internacional | 0

==== Semi-finals ====
2 August 2020
17:00 UTC−03:00

| Internacional | 4–0 | Esportivo |
|---|---|---|
| Thiago Galhardo 1'; Marcos Guilherme 12'; Paolo Guerrero 14'; Gabriel Boschilia 60' |

Estádio José Pinheiro Borda, Porto Alegre

3 August 2020

| Grêmio | 4–3 | Novo Hamburgo |
|---|---|---|
| Diego Souza 2', 59'; Maicon Souza 23'; Luciano 90' | | Zé Mario 31', 80' (pen.); Kayron 38' |

Arena do Grêmio, Porto Alegre

==== Final ====
5 August 2020
21:30 UTC−03:00

| Grêmio | 2–0 | Internacional |
|---|---|---|
| Maicon 50'; Isaque 81' |

Arena do Grêmio, Porto Alegre

== General table ==
| Pos | Team | Pld | W | D | L | GF | GA | GD | Pts |
|---|---|---|---|---|---|---|---|---|---|
| 1 | Internacional | 11 | 7 | 3 | 1 | 20 | 8 | +12 | 24 |
| 2 | Grêmio | 11 | 7 | 2 | 2 | 18 | 8 | +10 | 23 |
| 3 | Caxias | 11 | 6 | 3 | 2 | 12 | 7 | +5 | 21 |
| 4 | Esportivo | 11 | 5 | 4 | 2 | 16 | 17 | −1 | 19 |
| 5 | Ypiranga | 11 | 3 | 6 | 2 | 10 | 12 | −2 | 15 |
| 6 | São José | 11 | 4 | 2 | 5 | 9 | 11 | −2 | 14 |
| 7 | Aimoré | 11 | 3 | 4 | 4 | 13 | 13 | 0 | 13 |
| 8 | Juventude | 11 | 3 | 3 | 5 | 9 | 12 | −3 | 12 |
| 9 | Brasil de Pelotas | 11 | 3 | 2 | 6 | 6 | 10 | −4 | 11 |
| 10 | Novo Hamburgo | 11 | 2 | 5 | 4 | 5 | 8 | −3 | 11 |
| 11 | São Luiz | 11 | 2 | 2 | 7 | 12 | 17 | −5 | 8 |
| 12 | Pelotas | 11 | 2 | 2 | 7 | 11 | 18 | −7 | 8 |

Updated to match(es) played on 27 July 2020. Source: Standings
Rules for classification: 1) Points; 2) Wins; 3) Goal difference; 4) Goals scored; 5) Head-to-head; 6) Disciplinary record.

Originally, the two teams at the bottom of the general table would be relegated. Because of the COVID-19 pandemic, it was decided that no team would be relegated this season.
