= 2023 Grêmio FBPA season =

Grêmio
2023 season
- President: Alberto Guerra
- Manager: Renato Portaluppi
- Stadium: Arena do Grêmio
- Campeonato Brasileiro Série A: 2nd
- Campeonato Gaúcho: Winners
- Copa do Brasil: Semi-finals
- Recopa Gaúcha: Winners
- Top goalscorer: League: Luis Suárez (17); All: Luis Suárez (29)
Home colours	Away colours	Third colours

The 2023 season is Grêmio Foot-Ball Porto Alegrense's 120th season in existence and the club's. In addition to the Campeonato Brasileiro Série A, Grêmio participates in this season's editions of the Copa do Brasil, the Campeonato Gaúcho, and the Recopa Gaúcha.

== Squad information ==
=== First team squad ===
As of 6 November 2023.

Note: Flags indicate national team as defined under FIFA eligibility rules; some limited exceptions apply. Players may hold more than one non-FIFA nationality.

No.	Pos.	Nation	Player
2	DF	BRA	Fabio
3	DF	BRA	Pedro Geromel (captain)
4	DF	ARG	Walter Kannemann (3rd captain)
5	DF	BRA	Rodrigo Ely
6	DF	BRA	Reinaldo
7	FW	BRA	Luan
8	MF	URU	Felipe Carballo
9	FW	URU	Luis Suárez (vice-captain)
10	FW	BRA	Ferreira
11	FW	ITA	João Pedro Galvão (on loan from Fenerbahçe)
12	GK	BRA	Gabriel Grando
13	FW	BRA	Everton Galdino (on loan from Tombense)
14	MF	BRA	Nathan
15	DF	BRA	Bruno Uvini
17	MF	BRA	Gustavinho (on loan from América-MG)
18	DF	BRA	João Pedro

No.	Pos.	Nation	Player
19	MF	ARG	Franco Cristaldo
20	MF	PAR	Mathías Villasanti
21	FW	PAR	Juan Iturbe
22	FW	ARG	Lucas Besozzi (on loan from Lanús)
23	MF	BRA	Pepê
25	FW	BRA	Jhonata Robert
31	GK	BRA	Caíque Santos
32	FW	BRA	Nathan Fernandes
34	DF	BRA	Bruno Alves
35	MF	BRA	Ronald
36	DF	BRA	Natã
41	GK	BRA	Felipe Scheibig
45	MF	BRA	Mila
53	DF	BRA	Gustavo Martins
54	DF	BRA	Cuiabano
77	FW	BRA	André (on loan from Hercílio Luz)

== Competitions ==
=== Overview ===
Competition	First match	Last match	Starting round	Final position	Record							
Competition	First match	Last match	Starting round	Final position	Pld	W	D	L	GF	GA	GD	Win %
Campeonato Brasileiro Série A	16 April	6 December	Matchday 1	Runners-up	38	21	5	12	63	56	+7	55.26
Campeonato Gaúcho	21 January	8 April	First stage	Winners	15	11	3	1	27	9	+18	73.33
Copa do Brasil	1 March	16 August	First round	Semi-finals	10	4	4	2	12	7	+5	40.00
Recopa Gaúcha	17 January		Final	Winners	1	1	0	0	4	1	+3	100.00
Total					64	37	12	15	106	73	+33	57.81

Source: Soccerway

=== Recopa Gaúcha ===
17 January Final	Grêmio	4–1	São Luiz	Porto Alegre
19:30 UTC−3	Suárez 4', 30', 37'; Bitello 15'	Report	Paulinho Santos 13'	Stadium: Arena do Grêmio; Attendance: 49,614; Referee: Leandro Vuaden

=== Campeonato Gaúcho ===
==== Results summary ====
Overall								Home						Away					
Pld	W	D	L	GF	GA	GD	Pts	W	D	L	GF	GA	GD	W	D	L	GF	GA	GD
11	9	2	0	22	5	+17	29	5	0	0	14	2	+12	4	2	0	8	3	+5

Source: Soccerway

==== First stage ====
===== Table =====
Pos	Team	Pld	W	D	L	GF	GA	GD	Pts	Qualification or relegation
1	Grêmio	11	9	2	0	22	5	+17	29	Qualification to Knockout stage
2	Internacional	11	6	4	1	22	8	+14	22	Qualification to Knockout stage
3	Caxias	11	5	5	1	19	11	+8	20	Qualification to Knockout stage
4	Ypiranga	11	5	3	3	17	15	+2	18	Qualification to Knockout stage
5	Juventude	11	4	5	2	17	14	+3	17	

Updated to match(es) played on unknown. Source: Soccerway
Rules for classification: 1) Points; 2) Wins; 3) Goal difference; 4) Goals scored; 5) fewest red cards; 6) fewest yellow cards; 7) Draw in the headquarters of the FGF.

===== Results by matchday =====
Matchday	1	2	3	4	5	6	7	8	9	10	11
Ground	A	H	A	A	H	A	H	A	H	H	A
Result	W	W	W	W	W	W	W	D	W	W	D
Position	1	1	1	1	1	1	1	1	1	1	1

Source: Soccerway
A = Away; H = Home; W = Win; D = Draw; L = Loss

===== Matches =====
The first stage fixtures were announced on 10 November 2022.

Note: Match numbers indicated on the left hand side are references to the matchday scheduled by the Campeonato Gaúcho and not the order matches were played after postponements and rescheduled matches.

21 January 1	Caxias	1–2	Grêmio	Caxias do Sul
16:30 UTC−3	Peninha 9'	Report	Bitello 26'; Suárez 76'	Stadium: Estádio Centenário; Attendance: 7,940; Referee: Jean Pierre Gonçalves Lima

25 January 2	Grêmio	1–0	Brasil (PE)	Porto Alegre
21:30 UTC−3	Suárez 90'	Report		Stadium: Arena do Grêmio; Attendance: 29,806; Referee: Wagner Silveira Echevarria

29 January 3	São José-RS	0–1	Grêmio	Porto Alegre
20:30 UTC−3		Report	Everton Galdino 80'	Stadium: Estádio Passo D'Areia; Referee: Douglas Scwengber da Silva

1 February 4	Esportivo	0–2	Grêmio	Bento Gonçalves
20:00 UTC−3		Report	Pepê 75'; Ferreira 82'	Stadium: Estádio Montanha dos Vinhedos; Referee: Leandro Vuaden

4 February 5	Grêmio	3–0	Aimoré	Porto Alegre
16:30 UTC−3	Bruno Uvini 7'; Suárez 62', 86'	Report		Stadium: Arena do Grêmio; Attendance: 25,749; Referee: Rafael Rodrigo Klein

9 February 6	Juventude	2–3	Grêmio	Caxias do Sul
19:30 UTC−3	Rodrigo Rodrigues 54'; Mandaca 75'	Report	Bitello 4'; Reinaldo 10'; Bruno Alves 45+3'	Stadium: Estádio Alfedo Jaconi; Attendance: 10,912; Referee: Jean Pierre Gonçalves Lima

12 February 7	Grêmio	2–0	Avenida	Porto Alegre
16:00 UTC−3	Cristaldo 57'; Everton Galdino 90+3'	Report		Stadium: Arena do Grêmio; Attendance: 24,243; Referee: Francisco Soares Dias

18 February 8	São Luiz	0–0	Grêmio	Ijuí
16:30 UTC−3		Report		Stadium: Estádio 19 de Outubro; Referee: Rafael Rodrigo Klein

24 February 9	Grêmio	6–1	Novo Hamburgo	Porto Alegre
20:00 UTC−3	Vina 3'; Kannemann 7'; Cristaldo 8'; Bitello 20'; Bruno Alves 28'; Suárez 84'	Report	Matheus Vinicius 81'	Stadium: Arena do Grêmio; Attendance: 15,004; Referee: Douglas Scwengber da Silva

5 March 10	Grêmio	2–1	Internacional	Porto Alegre
20:00 UTC−3	Vina 45+4'; Carballo 90+4'	Report	Alan Patrick 76'	Stadium: Arena do Grêmio; Attendance: 49,460; Referee: Leandro Vuaden

11 March 11	Ypiranga-RS	0–0	Grêmio	Erechim
16:30 UTC−3		Report		Stadium: Estádio Colosso da Lagoa; Referee: Francisco Soares Dias

==== Knockout stage ====
===== Semi-finals =====
19 March First leg	Ypiranga-RS	2–1	Grêmio	Erechim
16:00 UTC−3	Erick 69' (pen.), 90+6' (pen.)	Report	Suárez 12'	Stadium: Estádio Colosso da Lagoa; Referee: Rafael Rodrigo Klein

25 March Second leg	Grêmio	2–1 (3–3 agg.) (5–4 p)	Ypiranga-RS	Porto Alegre
16:30 UTC−3	Thaciano 61'; Bruno Alves 78'	Report	Vitor Hugo 53'	Stadium: Arena do Grêmio; Attendance: 39,869; Referee: Douglas Scwengber da Silva
	Penalties
	Reinaldo (penalty missed); Cristaldo (penalty scored); Bitello (penalty scored); Suárez (penalty scored); Diego Souza (penalty missed); Bruno Alves (penalty scored); Gustavinho (penalty scored)		Gedeilson (penalty missed); Vitor Hugo (penalty scored); Erick (penalty scored); Ralph (penalty missed); Caíque (penalty scored); Ronald Carvalho (penalty scored); Jhonatan Ribeiro (penalty missed)

===== Finals =====
1 April First leg	Caxias	1–1	Grêmio	Caxias do Sul
16:30 UTC−3	Marlon 8'	Report	Vina 45+3'	Stadium: Estádio Centenário; Attendance: 15,879; Referee: Anderson Daronco

8 April Second leg	Grêmio	1–0 (2–1 agg.)	Caxias	Porto Alegre
16:30 UTC−3	Suárez 65' (pen.)	Report		Stadium: Arena do Grêmio; Attendance: 51,556; Referee: Leandro Vuaden

=== Campeonato Brasileiro Série A ===
==== League table ====
Pos	Team	Pld	W	D	L	GF	GA	GD	Pts	Qualification or relegation
1	Palmeiras (C)	38	20	10	8	64	33	+31	70	Qualification for Copa Libertadores group stage
2	Grêmio	38	21	5	12	63	56	+7	68	Qualification for Copa Libertadores group stage
3	Atlético Mineiro	38	19	9	10	52	32	+20	66	Qualification for Copa Libertadores group stage
4	Flamengo	38	19	9	10	56	42	+14	66	Qualification for Copa Libertadores group stage
5	Botafogo	38	18	10	10	58	37	+21	64	Qualification for Copa Libertadores second stage

Source: CBF
Rules for classification: 1) points; 2) wins; 3) goal difference; 4) goals scored; 5) head-to-head results (only between two teams); 6) fewest red cards; 7) fewest yellow cards; 8) drawing of lots.
(C) Champions

==== Results summary ====
Overall								Home						Away					
Pld	W	D	L	GF	GA	GD	Pts	W	D	L	GF	GA	GD	W	D	L	GF	GA	GD
38	21	5	12	63	56	+7	68	14	2	3	34	16	+18	7	3	9	29	40	−11

Source: Soccerway

==== Results by matchday ====
Matchday	1	2	3	4	5	6	7	8	9	10	11	12	13	14	15	16	17	18	19	20	21	22	23	24	25	26	27	28	29	30	31	32	33	34	35	36	37	38
Ground	H	A	A	H	A	H	H	A	H	A	H	H	A	H	A	H	A	A	H	A	H	H	A	H	A	A	H	A	H	A	A	H	A	H	A	H	H	A
Result	W	L	W	D	L	D	W	W	W	L	W	W	W	L	D	W	D	L	W	L	W	W	L	W	D	L	L	L	W	W	W	W	W	L	L	W	W	W
Position	9	13	7	7	10	11	10	5	4	6	3	2	2	3	3	2	4	6	3	5	3	3	3	3	3	3	4	6	6	4	4	4	2	3	5	5	4	2

Source: Confederação Brasileira de Futebol
A = Away; H = Home; W = Win; D = Draw; L = Loss; P = Postponed

==== Matches ====
The league fixtures were announced on 14 February 2023.

16 April 1	Grêmio	1–0	Santos	Caxias do Sul
18:30 UTC−3	João Pedro 44'	Report		Stadium: Estádio Alfredo Jaconi; Attendance: 13,997; Referee: Wilton Pereira Sampaio

22 April 2	Cruzeiro	1–0	Grêmio	Belo Horizonte
21:00 UTC−3	Bruno Rodrigues 64'	Report		Stadium: Independência; Attendance: 21,605; Referee: Flávio Rodrigues de Souza

30 April 3	Cuiabá	1–2	Grêmio	Cuiabá
18:30 UTC−3	Marllon 29'	Report	Vina 10'; Everton Galdino 68'	Stadium: Arena Pantanal; Attendance: 21,385; Referee: Bruno Arleu de Araújo

7 May 4	Grêmio	3–3	Red Bull Bragantino	Porto Alegre
18:30 UTC−3	Cristaldo 6' (pen.); Suárez 56'; Everton Galdino 62'	Report	Matheus Fernandes 9'; Sasha 53'; Thiago Borbas 90+1'	Stadium: Arena do Grêmio; Attendance: 23,760; Referee: Paulo César Zanovelli da Silva

10 May 5	Palmeiras	4–1	Grêmio	São Paulo
21:30 UTC−3	Raphael Veiga 23', 56' (pen.); Mayke 68'; Luan 73'	Report	Bitello 45+2'	Stadium: Allianz Parque; Attendance: 37,532; Referee: Bráulio da Silva Machado

14 May 6	Grêmio	0–0	Fortaleza	Porto Alegre
16:00 UTC−3		Report		Stadium: Arena do Grêmio; Attendance: 19,598; Referee: Bruno Mota Correia

21 May 7	Grêmio	3–1	Internacional	Porto Alegre
18:30 UTC−3	Suárez 7'; Villasanti 31'; Bitello 65'	Report	Johnny Cardoso 87'	Stadium: Arena do Grêmio; Attendance: 39,438; Referee: Flávio Rodrigues de Souza

28 May 8	Athletico Paranaense	1–2	Grêmio	Curitiba
18:30 UTC−3	Vitor Roque 34'	Report	Cuiabano 31'; Bruno Uvini 49'	Stadium: Ligga Arena; Attendance: 25,002; Referee: Sávio Pereira Sampaio

4 June 9	Grêmio	2–1	São Paulo	Porto Alegre
16:00 UTC−3	Cristaldo 31' (pen.); Reinaldo 39'	Report	Calleri 15'	Stadium: Arena do Grêmio; Attendance: 42,207; Referee: Wilton Pereira Sampaio

11 June 10	Flamengo	3–0	Grêmio	Rio de Janeiro
18:30 UTC−3	Everton 24'; Pedro 65'; Bruno Henrique 90+6'	Report		Stadium: Maracanã; Attendance: 62,967; Referee: Sávio Pereira Sampaio

22 June 11	Grêmio	3–1	América Mineiro	Porto Alegre
19:00 UTC−3	Matheus Cavichioli 40' (o.g.); Villasanti 61'; Suárez 69'	Report	Danilo Avelar 25'	Stadium: Arena do Grêmio; Attendance: 14,246; Referee: Edina Alves Batista

25 June 12	Grêmio	5–1	Coritiba	Porto Alegre
16:00 UTC−3	Cristaldo 34' (pen.); Villasanti 48'; Bitello 54'; Suárez 66'; André Henrique 84'	Report	Alef Manga 41'	Stadium: Arena do Grêmio; Attendance: 37,048; Referee: João Vitor Gobi

1 July 13	Bahia	1–2	Grêmio	Salvador
18:30 UTC−3	Vinicius Mingotti 20'	Report	Cristaldo 9'; Gustavo Martins 90+5'	Stadium: Arena Fonte Nova; Attendance: 34,090; Referee: Marcelo de Lima Henrique

9 July 14	Grêmio	0–2	Botafogo	Porto Alegre
18:30 --3		Report	Carlos Eduardo 74'; Carlos Alberto 88'	Stadium: Arena do Grêmio; Attendance: 47,029; Referee: Flávio Rodrigues de Souza

22 July 16	Grêmio	1–0	Atlético Mineiro	Porto Alegre
21:00 UTC−3	Ronald 11'	Report		Stadium: Arena do Grêmio; Attendance: 37,085; Referee: Luiz Flávio de Oliveira

30 July 17	Goiás	1–1	Grêmio	Goiânia
18:30 UTC−3	Matheus Babi 77'	Report	André Henrique 90+3'	Stadium: Estádio da Serrinha; Attendance: 12,311; Referee: Paulo César Zanovelli da Silva

6 August 18	Vasco	1–0	Grêmio	Rio de Janeiro
16:00 UTC−3	Vegetti 80'	Report		Stadium: Estádio São Januário; Attendance: 0 Referee: Luiz Flávio de Oliveira

13 August 19	Grêmio	2–1	Fluminense	Porto Alegre
16:00 UTC−3	Bitello 25'; Ferreira 45+1'	Report	Cano 19'	Stadium: Arena do Grêmio; Attendance: 38,712; Referee: Rodrigo José Pereira de Lima

20 August 20	Santos	2–1	Grêmio	Santos
16:00 UTC−3	Marcos Leonardo 63'; Julio Furch 90'	Report	Cristaldo 46'	Stadium: Vila Belmiro; Attendance: 12,933; Referee: Paulo César Zanovelli da Silva

27 August 21	Grêmio	3–0	Cruzeiro	Porto Alegre
19:00 UTC−3	Suárez 29'; Carballo 54'; Pepê 78'	Report		Stadium: Arena do Grêmio; Attendance: 24,938; Referee: Marcelo de Lima Henrique

3 September 22	Grêmio	2–0	Cuiabá	Porto Alegre
11:00 UTC−3	Suárez 30'; Rikelme 63' (o.g.)	Report		Stadium: Arena do Grêmio; Attendance: 39,339; Referee: Yuri Elino Ferreira da Cruz

14 September 23	Red Bull Bragantino	2–0	Grêmio	Bragança Paulista
21:30 UTC−3	João Pedro 20'; Vitinho 45+1'	Report		Stadium: Estádio Nabi Abi Chedid; Attendance: 5,088; Referee: André Luiz Skettino Policarpo Bento

18 September 15	Corinthians	4–4	Grêmio	São Paulo
21:00 UTC−3	Fábio Santos 45' (pen.); Lucas Veríssimo 45+4'; Yuri Alberto 45+6'; Giuliano 67'	Report	Nathan 21'; Cristaldo 27'; Everton Galdino 51'; Suárez 58'	Stadium: Neo Química Arena; Attendance: 36,076; Referee: Wilton Pereira Sampaio

21 September 24	Grêmio	1–0	Palmeiras	Porto Alegre
21:30 UTC−3	João Pedro 9'	Report		Stadium: Arena do Grêmio; Attendance: 29,057; Referee: Bruno Arleu de Araújo

30 September 25	Fortaleza	1–1	Grêmio	Fortaleza
16:00 UTC−3	Thiago Galhardo 44' (pen.)	Report	Suárez 80'	Stadium: Arena Castelão; Attendance: 23,634; Referee: Raphael Claus

8 October 26	Internacional	3–2	Grêmio	Porto Alegre
16:00 UTC−3	Valencia 6'; Wanderson 49'; Alan Patrick 70'	Report	João Pedro 67'; Suárez 74'	Stadium: Estádio Beira-Rio; Attendance: 39,133; Referee: Paulo César Zanovelli da Silva

18 October 27	Grêmio	1–2	Athletico Paranaense	Porto Alegre
19:00 UTC−3	Besozzi 7'	Report	Bruno Zapelli 38'; Kaique Rocha 90+4'	Stadium: Arena do Grêmio; Attendance: 24,679; Referee: Luiz Flávio de Oliveira

21 October 28	São Paulo	3–0	Grêmio	São Paulo
18:30 UTC−3	Michel Araújo 21'; Pablo Maia 68'; Luciano 90+7'	Report		Stadium: Morumbi; Attendance: 47,132; Referee: André Luiz Skettino Policarpo Bento

25 October 29	Grêmio	3–2	Flamengo	Porto Alegre
21:30 UTC−3	Ferreira 76'; Nathan Fernandes 81'; André Henrique 86'	Report	Everton 42'; Luiz Araújo 89'	Stadium: Arena do Grêmio; Attendance: 22,325; Referee: Rodrigo José Pereira de Lima

28 October 30	América Mineiro	3–4	Grêmio	Belo Horizonte
19:00 UTC−3	Rodriguinho 3'; Mastriani 35', 49'	Report	Reinaldo 17' (pen.); Everton Galdino 20'; Suárez 71'; Cristaldo 78'	Stadium: Independência; Attendance: 3,008; Referee: Matheus Candançan

1 November 31	Coritiba	1–2	Grêmio	Curitiba
20:00 UTC−3	Robson 60' (pen.)	Report	Villasanti 27'; Ferreira 83'	Stadium: Estádio Couto Pereira; Attendance: 24,308; Referee: Marcelo de Lima Henrique

4 November 32	Grêmio	1–0	Bahia	Porto Alegre
19:30 UTC−3	Suárez 70'	Report		Stadium: Arena do Grêmio; Attendance: 40,154; Referee: Bráulio da Silva Machado

9 November 33	Botafogo	3–4	Grêmio	Rio de Janeiro
20:00 UTC−3	Diego Costa 6'; Júnior Santos 29'; Marlon Freitas 46'	Report	Everton Galdino 9'; Suárez 50', 53', 69'	Stadium: Estádio São Januário; Attendance: 17,708; Referee: Ramon Abatti Abel

12 November 34	Grêmio	0–1	Corinthians	Porto Alegre
16:00 UTC−3		Report	Romero 32'	Stadium: Arena do Grêmio; Attendance: 51,842; Referee: Rodrigo José Pereira de Lima

26 November 35	Atlético Mineiro	3–0	Grêmio	Belo Horizonte
16:00 UTC−3	Arana 25'; Zaracho 50'; Hulk 58'	Report		Stadium: Arena MRV; Attendance: 39,337; Referee: Bráulio da Silva Machado

30 November 36	Grêmio	2–1	Goiás	Porto Alegre
19:00 UTC−3	Ferreira 50'; Cristaldo 56'	Report	Everton Morelli 28'	Stadium: Arena do Grêmio; Attendance: 38,683; Referee: Marcelo de Lima Henrique

3 December 37	Grêmio	1–0	Vasco	Porto Alegre
18:30 UTC−3	Suárez 46'	Report		Stadium: Arena do Grêmio; Attendance: 50,481; Referee: Ramon Abatti Abel

6 December 38	Fluminense	2–3	Grêmio	Rio de Janeiro
21:30 UTC−3	Jhon Arias 34'; John Kennedy 81'	Report	Suárez 43', 64' (pen.); Everton Galdino 45'	Stadium: Maracanã; Attendance: 43,286; Referee: Raphael Claus

=== Copa do Brasil ===
==== First round ====
The draw for the first round was held in 8 February 2023, 13:00 UTC−03:00, at the CBF headquarters in Rio de Janeiro.

1 March Single match	Campinense	0–2	Grêmio	Brasília
20:00 UTC−3		Report	Cristaldo 27'; Ferreira 87'	Stadium: Estádio Nacional Mané Garrincha; Referee: Luiz Flávio de Oliveira

==== Second round ====
16 March Single match	Grêmio	3–0	Ferroviário	Porto Alegre
20:00 UTC−3	Bruno Alves 45+2'; Suárez 55'; Ferreira 72'	Report		Stadium: Arena do Grêmio; Attendance: 26,421; Referee: Bruno Arleu de Araújo

==== Third round ====
The draw for the third round was held on 29 March 2023, 14:00 UTC−03:00, at the CBF headquarters in Rio de Janeiro.

13 April First leg	ABC	0–2	Grêmio	Natal
21:30 UTC−3		Report	Villasanti 75'; Bitello 80'	Stadium: Frasqueirão; Attendance: 15,036; Referee: Raphael Claus

27 April Second leg	Grêmio	1–1 (3–1 agg.)	ABC	Porto Alegre
21:30 UTC−3	Everton Galdino 90+2'	Report	Matheus Anjos 20'	Stadium: Arena do Grêmio; Attendance: 19,381; Referee: Dyorgines José Padovani de Andrade

==== Round of 16 ====
The draw for the round of 16 was held on 2 May 2023, 13:00 UTC−03:00, at the CBF headquarters in Rio de Janeiro.

17 May First leg	Grêmio	1–1	Cruzeiro	Porto Alegre
19:30 UTC−3	Suárez 78'	Report	Bruno Rodrigues 8'	Stadium: Arena do Grêmio; Attendance: 29,665; Referee: Raphael Claus

31 May Second leg	Cruzeiro	0–1 (1–2 agg.)	Grêmio	Belo Horizonte
20:00 UTC−3		Report	Villasanti 27'	Stadium: Mineirão; Attendance: 41,090; Referee: Flávio Rodrigues de Souza

==== Quarter-finals ====
The draw for the quarter-finals was held on 6 June 2023, 13:00 UTC−03:00, at the CBF headquarters in Rio de Janeiro.

4 July First leg	Bahia	1–1	Grêmio	Salvador
21:00 UTC−3	Everaldo 47'	Report	Cuiabano 90+5'	Stadium: Arena Fonte Nova; Attendance: 37,770; Referee: Ramon Abatti Abel

12 July Second leg	Grêmio	1–1 (2–2 agg.) (4–3 p)	Bahia	Porto Alegre
20:05 UTC−3	Villasanti 72'	Report	Everaldo 45+5'	Stadium: Arena do Grêmio; Attendance: 35,437; Referee: Wilton Pereira Sampaio
	Penalties
	Reinaldo (penalty scored); Ferreira (penalty scored); Bruno Alves (penalty missed); Villasanti (penalty scored); Bitello (penalty missed); André Henrique (penalty scored)		Cauly (penalty scored); Everaldo (penalty scored); Cicinho (penalty missed); Acevedo (penalty missed); Yago Felipe (penalty scored); Gabriel Xavier (penalty missed)

==== Semi-finals ====
26 July First leg	Grêmio	0–2	Flamengo	Porto Alegre
21:30 UTC−3		Report	Gabriel 34'; Bruno Alves 68' (o.g.)	Stadium: Arena do Grêmio; Attendance: 52,932; Referee: Raphael Claus

16 August Second leg	Flamengo	1–0 (3–0 agg.)	Grêmio	Rio de Janeiro
21:30 UTC−3	De Arrascaeta 74' (pen.)	Report		Stadium: Maracanã; Attendance: 65,310; Referee: Bráulio da Silva Machado
