= Walter Kannemann =

Argentine footballer (born 1991)

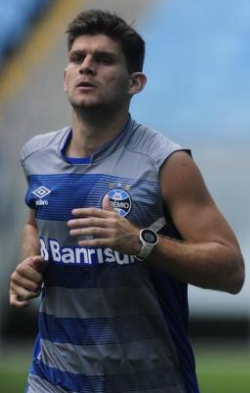
- Kennemann with Grêmio in 2017

Personal information
- Full name: Walter Kannemann
- Date of birth: 14 March 1991 (age 35)
- Place of birth: Concepción del Uruguay, Argentina
- Height: 1.84 m (6 ft 0 in)
- Position: Centre-back

Team information
- Current team: Grêmio
- Number: 4

Youth career
- 1999–2009: San Lorenzo

Senior career*
Years	Team	Apps	(Gls)
2010–2014	San Lorenzo	70	(4)
2015–2016	Atlas	38	(1)
2016–	Grêmio	238	(3)

International career^{‡}
2018–2019	Argentina	6	(0)
- * Club domestic league appearances and goals as of 14 December 2025 ‡ National team caps and goals as of 27 March 2019

Walter Kannemann (born 14 March 1991) is an Argentine professional footballer who plays as a centre-back for Campeonato Brasileiro Série A club Grêmio, which he captains.

== Club career ==
On 21 December 2014, Kannemann joined Liga MX club Atlas on a permanent transfer.

On 15 July 2016 Grêmio officially announced the signing of Walter Kannemann from Atlas for a €905,000 fee with a three-and-a-half-year contract until 31 December 2019. On 8 December 2022, he signed a one-year contract extension until December 2023. On 8 August 2023, he extended his contract until December 2025.

== International career ==
Kannemann made his international debut for Argentina on 8 September 2018 in a 3–0 international friendly against the Guatemala national football team. He became a naturalized citizen of Brazil in March 2026, but is not eligible to represent the country.

== Career statistics ==
=== Club ===
As of 11 February 2025

Appearances and goals by club, season and competition
Club	Season	League			State league (Note: Includes Campeonato Gaúcho)		National cup (Note: Includes Copa Argentina, Copa MX, Copa do Brasil)		Continental		Other		Total	
Club	Season	Division	Apps	Goals	Apps	Goals	Apps	Goals	Apps	Goals	Apps	Goals	Apps	Goals
San Lorenzo	2009–10	Primera División	1	0	—		0	0	—		—		1	0
San Lorenzo	2010–11	Primera División	0	0	—		0	0	—		—		0	0
San Lorenzo	2011–12	Primera División	4	1	—		6	0	—		2 (Note: Appearances in play-offs)	0	12	1
San Lorenzo	2012–13	Primera División	23	2	—		2	0	1 (Note: Appearance(s) in Copa Sudamericana)	0	—		26	2
San Lorenzo	2013–14	Primera División	24	1	—		2	0	—		—		26	1
San Lorenzo	2014	Primera División	18	0	—		0	0	5 (Note: Appearances in Copa Libertadores)	0	2 (Note: Appearances in FIFA Club World Cup)	0	25	0
San Lorenzo	Total		70	4	—		10	0	6	0	4	0	90	4
Atlas	2014–15	Liga MX	15	1	—		0	0	—		—		15	1
Atlas	2015–16	Liga MX	23	0	—		5	0	—		—		28	0
Atlas	Total		38	1	—		5	0	—		—		43	1
Grêmio	2016	Série A	13	0	—		8	0	—		—		21	0
Grêmio	2017	Série A	23	1	13	0	6	1	12	0	—		54	2
Grêmio	2018	Série A	18	0	10	0	3	0	11	1	2 (Note: Appearances in Recopa Sudamericana)	0	44	1
Grêmio	2019	Série A	17	1	8	0	4	0	12	0	—		41	1
Grêmio	2020	Série A	16	0	9	0	4	0	3	0	—		32	0
Grêmio	2021	Série A	21	0	0	0	4	0	3 (Note: One appearance in Copa Libertadores, two appearances in Copa Sudamericana)	0	—		28	0
Grêmio	2022	Série B	8	0	0	0	0	0	—		—		8	0
Grêmio	2023	Série A	28	0	10	1	8	0	—		—		56	1
Grêmio	2024	Série A	13	0	11	0	2	0	5	0	—		31	0
Grêmio	2025	Série A	0	0	0	0	0	0	0	0	—		0	0
Grêmio	Total		157	2	61	1	39	1	46	1	2	0	305	5
Career total			265	7	61	1	54	1	52	1	6	0	438	10

=== International ===
As of match played 13 October 2019

Argentina
Year	Apps	Goals
2018	3	0
2019	3	0
Total	6	0

== Honours ==
=== Club ===
San Lorenzo

- Copa Libertadores: 2014
- Argentine Primera División: 2013 Inicial

Grêmio

- Copa Libertadores: 2017
- Recopa Sudamericana: 2018
- Copa do Brasil: 2016
- Campeonato Gaúcho: 2018, 2019, 2020, 2021, 2022, 2023, 2024, 2026
- Recopa Gaúcha: 2019, 2021, 2022, 2023, 2025
