= Mathías Villasanti =

Paraguayan footballer (born 1997)

Personal information
- Full name: Mathías Adalberto Villasanti Rolón
- Date of birth: 24 January 1997 (age 29)
- Place of birth: Caacupé, Paraguay
- Height: 1.78 m (5 ft 10 in)
- Position: Midfielder

Team information
- Current team: Grêmio
- Number: 20

Youth career
- Cerro Porteño

Senior career*
Years	Team	Apps	(Gls)
2016–2021	Cerro Porteño	91	(5)
2017–2018	→ Temperley (loan)	14	(1)
2018	→ Sportivo Luqueño (loan)	18	(4)
2021–	Grêmio	176	(12)

International career^{‡}
2016–2018	Paraguay U20	13	(0)
2019–	Paraguay	52	(0)
- * Club domestic league appearances and goals as of 11 October 2026 ‡ National team caps and goals as of 27 September 2026

Mathías Adalberto Villasanti Rolón (born 24 January 1997) is a Paraguayan professional footballer who plays as a midfielder for Campeonato Brasileiro Série A club Grêmio and the Paraguay national team.

== Club career ==
=== Early years ===
Villasanti made 36 league appearances including 31 starts in the 2019 season. In the same season he also featured in the Copa Libertadores on ten occasions. “The Copa taught me some great lessons and made me a better player. The game against Mineiro, in truth, was one of the most beautiful things in the tournament because with the push of our fans we added goals in the blink of an eye.”, said Mathias.

=== Grêmio ===
On 12 August 2021 Grêmio officially announced the signing of Villasanti, for a US$3.3m transfer fee, with the contract running until December 2024.

In 2022, conquered of 2022 Campeonato Gaúcho, his first title with the club. In the following season, was champions 2023 Campeonato Gaúcho and runner-up in the 2023 Campeonato Brasileiro Série A, being one of the highlights of the competition and named para o Bola de Plata.

== International career ==
Villasanti made his senior national team debut on 10 October 2019 in a friendly against Serbia.

== Personal life ==
Villasanti's mother has worked for 10 years in a pharmacy in Malabo, Equatorial Guinea to send him money for his well-being. Once he became a well-paid footballer, he brought his mother back to Paraguay.

== Career statistics ==
=== Club ===
As of match played 11 October 2026

Appearances and goals by club, season and competition
Club	Season	League			State League		Cup		Continental		Other		Total	
Club	Season	Division	Apps	Goals	Apps	Goals	Apps	Goals	Apps	Goals	Apps	Goals	Apps	Goals
Cerro Porteño	2016	APF División de Honor	7	1	—		—		0	0	—		7	1
Cerro Porteño	2017	APF División de Honor	6	0	—		—		1 (Note: Appearances in Copa Sudamericana)	0	—		7	0
Cerro Porteño	2019	APF División de Honor	36	3	—		—		10 (Note: Appearances in Copa Libertadores)	0	—		46	3
Cerro Porteño	2020	APF División de Honor	26	1	—		—		3	0	—		29	1
Cerro Porteño	2021	APF División de Honor	16	0	—		—		7	0	—		23	0
Cerro Porteño	Total		91	5	—		—		21	0	—		112	5
Temperley (loan)	2017–18	AFA Liga Profesional de Fútbol	14	1	—		—		—		1	0	15	1
Sportivo Luqueño (loan)	2018	APF División de Honor	18	4	—		—		—		—		18	4
Grêmio	2021	Série A	16	1	—		2	0	—		—		18	1
Grêmio	2022	Série B	32	1	11	1	0	0	—		—		43	2
Grêmio	2023	Série A	30	4	9	0	9	3	—		—		48	7
Grêmio	2024	Série A	26	3	15	1	4	0	4	0	—		49	4
Grêmio	2025	Série A	16	0	10	0	2	0	5 (Note: Appearances in Copa Sudamericana)	0	—		33	0
Grêmio	2026	Série A	11	1	0	0	4	0	2	1	—		17	2
Grêmio	Total		131	10	45	2	21	3	11	1	—		209	16
Career total			254	16	45	2	21	3	32	1	1	0	353	26

=== International ===
As of match played 27 September 2026

National team	Year	Apps	Goals
Paraguay	2019	4	0
Paraguay	2020	4	0
Paraguay	2021	12	0
Paraguay	2022	8	0
Paraguay	2023	7	0
Paraguay	2024	12	0
Paraguay	2025	4	0
Paraguay	2026	1	0
Total		52	0

== Honours ==
Grêmio

- Campeonato Gaúcho: 2022, 2023, 2024, 2026
- Recopa Gaúcha: 2022, 2023, 2025

=== Individual ===
- People's Player, by APF: 2020
- Paraguayan Footballer of the Year: 2023
- Best Central Midfielder in Brazil: 2023
- Bola de Prata: 2023
- Team of the Tournament of the Copa do Brasil: 2023
