= Natã Felipe =

Brazilian footballer (born 2005)

Personal information
- Full name: Natã Felipe de Amorim Santos
- Date of birth: 5 June 2001 (age 25)
- Place of birth: Ribeirão Preto, Brazil
- Height: 1.82 m (6 ft 0 in)
- Position: Centre back

Team information
- Current team: Atlético Goianiense (on loan from Juventude

Youth career
- Cianorte
- 2018: → Coritiba (loan)
- 2019–2021: Grêmio

Senior career*
Years	Team	Apps	(Gls)
2021–2025	Grêmio	22	(0)
2021–2022	→ Aimoré (loan)	20	(1)
2025–	Juventude	2	(0)
2026–	→ Atlético Goianiense (loan)	12	(1)
- * Club domestic league appearances and goals as of 15 December 2025

Natã Felipe de Amorim Santos (born 5 June 2001), simply known as Natã or Natã Felipe, is a Brazilian professional footballer who plays as a central defender for Atlético Goianiense, on loan from Juventude.

== Career ==
Natã was born in Ribeirão Preto, São Paulo, and moved to Rondon, Paraná at early age. He joined Grêmio's youth setup in 2019, after representing Cianorte and Coritiba.

In 2021, after two years with the under-20 team, Natã was loaned to Série D side Aimoré until the end of the year. He quickly became a starter for the side, and had his loan renewed for the 2022 Campeonato Gaúcho.

Natã returned to Grêmio in March 2022, and renewed his contract with the club until the end of 2023. He made his first team debut on 24 May, starting in a 5–0 away routing of Glória, for the year's Recopa Gaúcha.

== Career statistics ==
As of 27 June 2023

Appearances and goals by club, season and competition
Club	Season	League			State League		National Cup		Continental		Other		Total	
Club	Season	Division	Apps	Goals	Apps	Goals	Apps	Goals	Apps	Goals	Apps	Goals	Apps	Goals
Aimoré	2021	Série D	10	0	—		—		—		12 (Note: Appearance(s) in Copa FGF)	0	22	0
Aimoré	2022	Série D	0	0	10	1	—		—		—		10	1
Aimoré	Total		10	0	10	1	—		—		12	0	32	1
Grêmio	2022	Série B	5	0	—		0	0	—		2 (Note: One appearance in Recopa Gaúcha, one appearance in Copa FGF)	0	7	0
Grêmio	2023	Série A	1	0	2	0	0	0	—		0	0	3	0
Grêmio	Total		6	0	2	0	0	0	—		2	0	10	0
Career total			16	0	12	1	0	0	0	0	14	0	42	1

== Honours ==
Grêmio

- Recopa Gaúcha: 2022, 2023
- Campeonato Gaúcho: 2023, 2024
