= Ferreira (footballer, born 1997) =

Brazilian footballer

Personal information
- Full name: Aldemir dos Santos Ferreira
- Date of birth: 31 December 1997 (age 28)
- Place of birth: Dourados, Brazil
- Height: 1.75 m (5 ft 9 in)
- Position: Winger

Team information
- Current team: São Paulo
- Number: 11

Youth career
- 2014–2019: Grêmio

Senior career*
Years	Team	Apps	(Gls)
2016–2024	Grêmio	120	(16)
2016-2017	→ São Luiz (loan)	42	(8)
2017–2018	→ Toledo (loan)	38	(6)
2018–2019	→ Cianorte (loan)	34	(8)
2019–2022	→ Aimoré (loan)	62	(14)
2024–	São Paulo	88	(16)
- * Club domestic league appearances and goals as of 6 April 2026

Aldemir dos Santos Ferreira (born 31 December 1997), commonly known as Ferreira or Ferreirinha, is a Brazilian professional footballer who plays as a winger for Campeonato Brasileiro Série A club São Paulo.

== Club career ==
Born in Dourados, Mato Grosso do Sul, Ferreira joined Grêmio's youth setup in 2014, from a football school back in his homeland. In 2016, he was loaned to São Luiz for the Campeonato Gaúcho Série A2 and made his senior debut on 13 March, starting in a 3–2 home win against Panambi.

Ferreira scored his first senior goal on 24 March 2016, netting the game's only in a home success over Caxias. After contributing with two goals during the tournament, he returned to Grêmio and was assigned to the under-20s.

On 14 December 2017, after finishing his formation, Ferreira was loaned to Toledo for the ensuing Campeonato Paranaense. Regularly used, he joined neighbouring Cianorte for the 2018 Série D, still owned by Grêmio.

On 9 January 2019, Ferreira moved to Aimoré on loan, but featured rarely due to a foot injury. He then returned to Tricolor and was assigned to the reserve team for the Campeonato Brasileiro de Aspirantes.

On 23 July 2019, Ferreira extended his contract with Grêmio until the end of 2021, and helped the reserves finish second in the Brasileirão de Aspirantes. He made his first team debut on 29 September, coming on as a second-half substitute for Luciano in a 2–1 away loss against Fluminense for the Série A championship.

Ferreira scored his first goal in the top tier on 5 December 2019, netting the opener in a 2–0 home defeat of Cruzeiro.

On 9 January 2024, Ferreira signed a three-year contract with fellow Série A club São Paulo, for a reported fee of €1.5 million.

== Career statistics ==
As of 23 April 2023

Appearances and goals by club, season and competition
Club	Season	National League			State league		Cup		Continental		Other		Total	
Club	Season	Division	Apps	Goals	Apps	Goals	Apps	Goals	Apps	Goals	Apps	Goals	Apps	Goals
São Luiz	2016	Gaúcho A2	—		21	2	—		—		—		21	2
Toledo	2018	Paranaense	—		11	2	—		—		—		11	2
Cianorte	2018	Série D	4	0	—		—		—		—		4	0
Aimoré	2019	Gaúcho	—		2	0	—		—		—		2	0
Grêmio	2019	Série A	4	1	—		—		—		—		4	1
Grêmio	2020	Série A	22	2	4	0	8	0	6 (Note: Appearance(s) in Copa Libertadores)	1	—		40	3
Grêmio	2021	Série A	29	3	13	4	2	0	8 (Note: Four appearances and two goals in Copa Libertadores, four appearances and five goals in Copa Sudamericana)	7	—		52	14
Grêmio	2022	Série B	9	1	6	0	0	0	—		—		15	1
Grêmio	2023	Série A	0	0	8	1	2	2	—		—		10	3
Grêmio	Total		64	7	31	5	12	2	14	8	—		121	22
Career total			68	7	65	9	12	2	14	8	0	0	159	26

== Honours ==
Grêmio

- Campeonato Gaúcho: 2020, 2021, 2022, 2023
- Recopa Gaúcha: 2021, 2022, 2023

São Paulo

- Supercopa do Brasil: 2024
