= Thomas Luciano =

Brazilian footballer

Personal information
- Full name: Thomas Luciano Trindade Lopes Mathias
- Date of birth: 14 January 2002 (age 24)
- Place of birth: Porto Alegre, Brazil
- Height: 1.80 m (5 ft 11 in)
- Position: Right-back

Team information
- Current team: Amazonas (on loan from Gil Vicente)
- Number: 58

Youth career
- 2013–2022: Grêmio

Senior career*
Years	Team	Apps	(Gls)
2021–2023	Grêmio	7	(0)
2021	→ Pelotas (loan)	3	(0)
2023–	Gil Vicente	4	(1)
2024	→ Ponte Preta (loan)	3	(0)
2025–	→ Amazonas (loan)	10	(0)
- * Club domestic league appearances and goals as of 18 December 2025

Thomas Luciano Trindade Lopes Mathias (born 14 January 2002), known as Thomas Luciano, is a Brazilian professional footballer who plays as a right-back for Amazonas on loan from Primeira Liga club Gil Vicente.

== Club career ==
=== Grêmio ===
Born in Porto Alegre, Rio Grande do Sul, Thomas Luciano joined the Grêmio's Academy at the age of 11 in 2013.

On 6 July 2023, Primeira Liga side Gil Vicente announced the signing of Luciano on a three-year contract.

== Career statistics ==
=== Club ===
As of 28 May 2023.

Appearances and goals by club, season and competition
Club	Season	League			State League		National Cup		Continental		Other		Total	
Club	Season	Division	Apps	Goals	Apps	Goals	Apps	Goals	Apps	Goals	Apps	Goals	Apps	Goals
Grêmio	2021	Série A	0	0	—		0	0	—		—		0	0
Grêmio	2022	Série B	0	0	0	0	0	0	—		—		0	0
Grêmio	2023	Série A	6	0	1 (Note: Appearance(s) in Campeonato Gaúcho.)	0	1	0	—		—		8	0
Grêmio	Total		6	0	1	0	1	0	—		—		8	0
Pelotas (loan)	2021	Gaúcho	—		3	0	—		—		—		3	0
Career total			6	0	4	0	1	0	0	0	0	0	11	0

== Honours ==
Grêmio

- Recopa Gaúcha: 2022, 2023
- Campeonato Gaúcho: 2023
