= Gustavo Martins =

Brazilian footballer (born 2002)

Personal information
- Full name: Gustavo Martins de Souza Santos
- Date of birth: 11 August 2002 (age 24)
- Place of birth: Niterói, Brazil
- Height: 1.91 m (6 ft 3 in)
- Position: Centre-back

Team information
- Current team: Grêmio
- Number: 6

Youth career
- 2012–2015: Botafogo
- 2015–2017: Vasco da Gama
- 2017–2018: Canto do Rio
- 2018–2022: Grêmio

Senior career*
Years	Team	Apps	(Gls)
2021–	Grêmio	88	(9)
2021	→ Caxias (loan)	1	(0)

International career
2023–	Brazil U23	5	(1)
Medal record
Men's football
Representing Brazil
Pan American Games
Winner	2023 Santiago
- * Club domestic league appearances and goals as of 7 April 2026

Gustavo Martins de Souza Santos (born 11 August 2002), commonly known as Gustavo Martins, is a Brazilian professional footballer who plays as a centre-back for Campeonato Brasileiro Série A club Grêmio.

== Club career ==
=== Grêmio ===
Born in Niterói, Brazil, Gustavo Martins joined the Grêmio's Academy at the age of 16 in 2018.

== Career statistics ==
=== Club ===
As of match played 22 November 2025

Appearances and goals by club, season and competition
Club	Season	League			Campeonato Gaúcho		Copa do Brasil		Continental		Other		Total	
Club	Season	Division	Apps	Goals	Apps	Goals	Apps	Goals	Apps	Goals	Apps	Goals	Apps	Goals
Grêmio	2021	Série A	0	0	0	0	0	0	0	0	0	0	0	0
Grêmio	2022	Série B	0	0	1	0	0	0	—		0	0	1	0
Grêmio	2023	Série A	17	1	4	0	4	0	—		0	0	25	1
Grêmio	2024	Série A	19	2	5	1	1	0	5 (Note: Appearance(s) in Copa Libertadores)	0	1 (Note: Appearance(s) in Recopa Gaúcha)	0	31	3
Grêmio	2025	Série A	17	1	10	2	1	0	2 (Note: Appearance(s) in Copa Sudamericana)	1	1	0	31	3
Grêmio	Total		53	4	20	3	6	0	7	1	2	0	88	7
Caxias (loan)	2021	Série D	0	0	1	0	0	0	—		—		1	0
Career total			53	4	21	3	6	0	7	1	2	0	89	7

== Honours ==
=== Club ===
Grêmio

- Campeonato Gaúcho: 2023, 2024, 2026
- Recopa Gaúcha: 2023, 2025
