= Adriel (footballer, born 2001) =

Brazilian footballer

Personal information
- Full name: Adriel Vasconcelos Ramos
- Date of birth: 14 January 2001 (age 25)
- Place of birth: Ilhéus, Brazil
- Height: 1.95 m (6 ft 5 in)
- Position: Goalkeeper

Team information
- Current team: Torreense
- Number: 31

Youth career
- 2019–2022: Grêmio

Senior career*
Years	Team	Apps	(Gls)
2021–2026	Grêmio	11	(0)
2023–2024	→ Bahia (loan)	13	(0)
2025	→ Athletic-MG (loan)	30	(0)
2026	→ AVS (loan)	16	(0)
2026–	Torreense	0	(0)
- * Club domestic league appearances and goals as of 18 May 2026

Adriel Vasconcelos Ramos (born 14 January 2001), known as Adriel, is a Brazilian professional footballer who plays as a goalkeeper for Liga Portugal 2 club Torreense.

== Career ==
Adriel started his career with Grêmio.

On 1 January 2025, Adriel moved to Portugal, joining Primeira Liga club AVS on loan until the end of the season, with an optional buy-clause.

== Honours ==
Grêmio

- Campeonato Gaúcho: 2021, 2022, 2023
- Recopa Gaúcha: 2021, 2022, 2023
