= Diego Souza (footballer, born 1985) =

Brazilian footballer

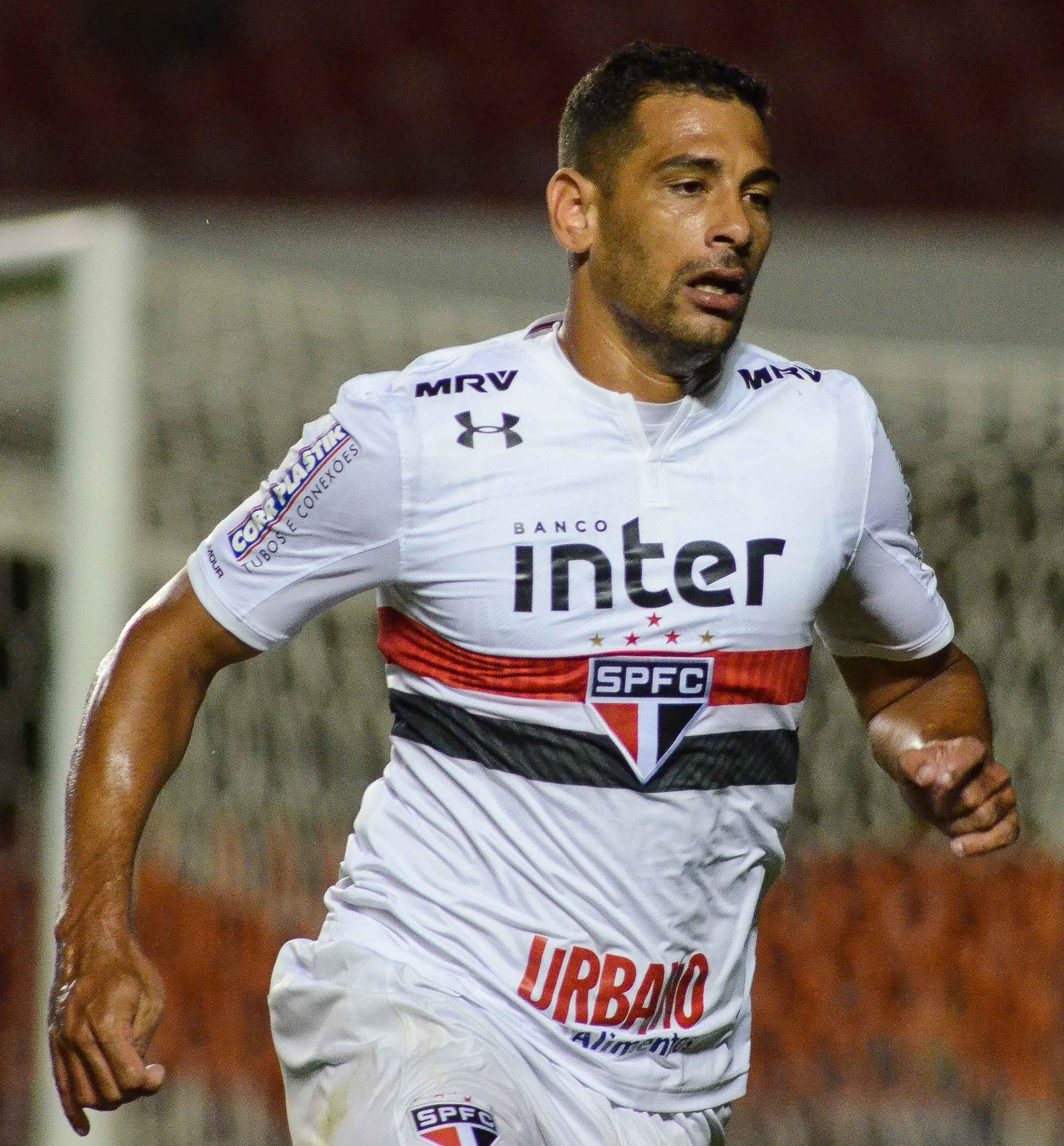
- Souza with São Paulo in 2018

Personal information
- Full name: Diego de Souza Andrade
- Date of birth: 17 June 1985 (age 41)
- Place of birth: Rio de Janeiro, Brazil
- Height: 1.86 m (6 ft 1 in)
- Positions: Forward; midfielder

Team information
- Current team: Joinville (head coach)

Youth career
- 2002–2003: Fluminense

Senior career*
Years	Team	Apps	(Gls)
2003–2005	Fluminense	60	(8)
2005–2007	Benfica	0	(0)
2005–2006	→ Flamengo (loan)	35	(7)
2007	→ Grêmio (loan)	64	(16)
2008–2010	Palmeiras	130	(34)
2010–2011	Atlético Mineiro	34	(5)
2011–2012	Vasco da Gama	87	(30)
2012	Al-Ittihad	5	(2)
2013	Cruzeiro	22	(7)
2013–2015	Metalist Kharkiv	19	(1)
2014–2015	→ Sport Recife (loan)	78	(21)
2016	Fluminense	9	(4)
2016–2017	Sport Recife	95	(36)
2018–2019	São Paulo	59	(17)
2019	→ Botafogo (loan)	41	(9)
2020–2023	Grêmio	155	(71)
2023	Sport Recife	11	(1)
Total		904	(255)

International career
- Brazil U17
2005	Brazil U20	2	(0)
2009–2017	Brazil	7	(2)

Managerial career
- 2026–: Joinville
- * Club domestic league appearances and goals

Diego de Souza Andrade (born 17 June 1985) is a Brazilian football coach and former player who played as a forward or a midfielder. He is the current head coach of Joinville.

In a journeyman career, he played for ten clubs in the Campeonato Brasileiro Série A, including nine of the Big Twelve, having begun at Fluminense in 2003. He also played for Sport Recife, where he was Série A top scorer in 2016, and had brief spells in Portugal, Saudi Arabia and Ukraine. He earned seven caps for Brazil from his debut in 2009, scoring twice.

== Club career ==
=== Early career ===
Born in Rio de Janeiro, Souza began playing club football for Fluminense in the Campeonato Brasileiro Série A. In May 2005, he signed a five-year deal with Portugal's Benfica. That July he was loaned to Fluminense's rivals Flamengo – the club he supported as a child – until May 2006, with his wages to be split between Benfica and Flamengo.

Souza was loaned for the year 2007 to Grêmio. In May that year, Benfica set a fee of €4 million (R$11 million) if the move were to be made permanent. In that year's Copa Libertadores, he scored in wins over compatriots São Paulo (quarter-final) and Santos (semi-final) as his team finished runners-up.

=== Palmeiras ===
In 2008, he moved to Palmeiras (and partner) for €3.75 million total fee. He signed a contract until December 2011. Co-currently, along with Lenny, Fluminense transferred its shares on both players' economic rights to Desportivo Brasil (owned by Traffic Group) as part of the deal, made Fluminense gained a profit of R$ 1,320 thousand and R$1,500 thousand respectively. Both players were signed by Palmeiras as part of R$40 million partnership with Traffic, which Palmeiras only owned 10~20% of the rights of Diego.

On 18 April 2009, he received a red card after an argument with Domingos during the state semi finals match against Santos. He later took Domingos down after coming back to the field.

=== Atlético Mineiro ===
On 30 June 2010, Atlético Mineiro's president Alexandre Kalil announced the signing of Souza. After the transaction, the club from Belo Horizonte owned 70% of his economic rights and Traffic the rest, with the team having paid reported R$6.6 million (€2.2 million).

=== Vasco da Gama ===
On 2 March 2011, Souza signed for Vasco da Gama on a four-year deal. The Rio-based club paid €1.5 million to Atlético who retained 17% of his economic rights, €500,000 to sportswear firm Penalty, and €1.2 million to Traffic. He reached double figures in the national league for the first time with 11 goals, including a hat-trick on 25 September in a 3–0 win at Cruzeiro. The team also won the Copa do Brasil for which he added three more, including one in each leg of a 3–1 aggregate win over Avaí.

=== Al Ittihad and Cruzeiro ===
In July 2012, Souza moved back abroad to Al-Ittihad of the Saudi Professional League. He began legal action against the club in October due to unpaid wages. Denied an exit visa from the Middle Eastern kingdom, he sought help from the Brazilian embassy in Riyadh in November.

Cruzeiro signed Souza before the end of 2012, and the transfer was allowed to go through by the following February when FIFA denied an appeal by Al Ittihad. He scored four goals as they came runners-up to his former team Atlético in the Campeonato Mineiro, including two in a 4–0 (5–0 aggregate) home win over Villa Nova in the semi-finals on 28 April.

=== Metalist Kharkiv and Sport ===
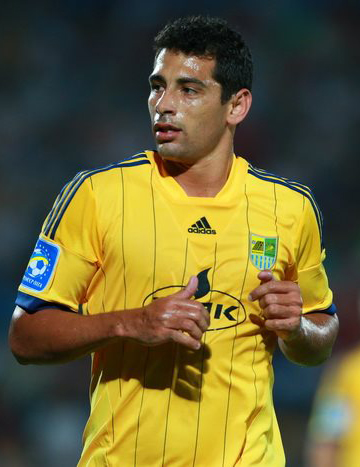
Souza with Metalist Kharkiv in 2013

In July 2013, Souza moved to Metalist Kharkiv in Ukraine, for a fee of €4 million. In January 2014, he wanted to return to Brazil to escape the 2014 pro-Russian unrest in Ukraine. A loan deal with Sport Recife was set in September 2014.

At the end of 2015, Souza signed a three-year deal to return to Fluminense after over a decade away. The following 22 March however, he returned to Sport on a deal until the end of 2017. He finished the 2016 Campeonato Brasileiro Série A as one of three joint top scorers with 14 goals in 34 games, equalling a club record from 1984 and becoming only the third Série A top scorer from a northeastern club – the first since Bahia's Charles Fabian in 1990.

=== Later career ===
On 7 January 2018, Souza signed for São Paulo on a two-year deal for a fee of R$10 million, with the club obtaining his full economic rights. Seventeen days later, he netted his first goal to open a 2–0 victory against Mirassol in the 2018 Campeonato Paulista. His only national campaign with the Tricolor yielded 12 goals, putting him third in the league's top scorers behind Santos' Gabriel Barbosa and Atlético Mineiro's Ricardo Oliveira.

After losing his place at São Paulo, Souza transferred on 8 March 2019 to Botafogo. This was his 10th Série A club, his 9th of the Big Twelve, and made him the 17th player to represent all four Rio-based members of the latter. His first Série A goal for the club came on 2 June as the only one of a home win against city rivals and former club Vasco.

Souza's contract with Botafogo expired at the start of 2020, and he moved on a free transfer to Grêmio over a decade after leaving the club from Porto Alegre. In the year's Campeonato Gaúcho, he was top scorer with 9 goals in 11 games as his team won the title, including one in the 3–2 aggregate final win over Caxias in August. He scored 13 times in the national league season, four times in the Copa do Brasil and twice in the Copa Libertadores, to end the year as the top scorer in Brazilian football with 28, one more than Flamengo's Gabriel Barbosa.

Souza announced his retirement from playing in February 2024.

== International career ==
Souza was part of the Brazil U-23 side in 2007 under coach Dunga. He was in the winning squad of Brazil U-17 at the 2001 South American U-17 Championship in Peru. He played twice in 2005 FIFA World Youth Championship.

In September 2009, Souza was called up for the first time to the senior national team, by coach Dunga for a game against Chile in 2010 FIFA World Cup qualification. He made his debut against Bolivia on 11 October in another qualifier, being replaced at half time by Alex Raphael Meschini in a 2–1 loss in La Paz; it was the nation's first defeat in 16 months. He did not return to the team until 28 September 2011, when he came on as a 68th-minute substitute for Lucas Moura in a 2–0 win over Argentina in the Superclásico de las Américas.

Following his first two caps, Souza had to wait over five years for another opportunity in January 2017, when Tite selected him for a friendly against Colombia based on his form for Sport Recife, and he retained his place for World Cup qualifiers that year. On 13 June that year he scored his first international goals in a 4–0 win over Australia at the Melbourne Cricket Ground, in the eleventh second and in added time.

== Career statistics ==
=== Club ===
Appearances and goals by club, season and competition
Club	Season	League			State League		Cup		Continental		Other		Total	
Club	Season	Division	Apps	Goals	Apps	Goals	Apps	Goals	Apps	Goals	Apps	Goals	Apps	Goals
Fluminense	2003	Série A	7	0	—		—		3 (Note: Appearance(s) in Copa Sudamericana)	0	—		10	0
Fluminense	2004	Série A	29	3	12	4	3	0	—		—		44	7
Fluminense	2005	Série A	4	0	8	1	6	3	—		—		18	4
Fluminense	Total		40	3	20	5	9	3	3	0	—		72	11
Benfica	2005–06	Primeira Liga	0	0	—		—		—		—		0	0
Flamengo (loan)	2005	Série A	21	5	—		—		—		—		21	5
Flamengo (loan)	2006	Série A	1	0	8	2	3	0	—		—		12	2
Flamengo (loan)	Total		22	5	8	2	3	0	—		—		33	7
Grêmio (loan)	2007	Série A	33	8	16	6	—		12 (Note: Appearance(s) in Copa Libertadores)	2	—		61	16
Palmeiras	2008	Série A	33	6	19	5	4	1	—		—		56	12
Palmeiras	2009	Série A	34	9	16	6	—		12	4	—		62	19
Palmeiras	2010	Série A	0	0	15	7	7	1	—		—		22	8
Palmeiras	Total		67	15	50	18	11	2	12	4	—		140	39
Atlético Mineiro	2010	Série A	28	5	—		—		4	0	—		21	5
Atlético Mineiro	2011	Série A	0	0	2	0	—		—		—		2	0
Atlético Mineiro	Total		28	5	2	0	—		4	0	—		34	5
Vasco da Gama	2011	Série A	32	11	6	1	9	3	5	2	—		52	17
Vasco da Gama	2012	Série A	9	3	16	6	—		9	3	—		34	12
Vasco da Gama	Total		41	14	22	7	9	3	14	5	—		86	29
Al-Ittihad	2012–13	Saudi Professional League	5	2	—		0	0	3 (Note: Appearance(s) in AFC Champions League)	1	—		8	3
Cruzeiro	2013	Série A	6	1	12	4	4	2	0	0	—		22	7
Metalist Kharkiv	2013–14	Ukrainian Premier League	19	1	—		2	2	2 (Note: Appearance(s) in UEFA Champions League)	0	—		23	3
Sport Recife (loan)	2014	Série A	19	4	—		—		1	0	—		20	4
Sport Recife (loan)	2015	Série A	34	9	9	4	2	2	3	0	10 (Note: Appearance(s) in Copa do Nordeste)	2	58	17
Sport Recife (loan)	Total		53	13	9	4	2	2	4	0	10	5	78	21
Fluminense	2016	Série A	0	0	8	1	0	0	—		1 (Note: Appearance(s) in Primeira Liga)	3	9	4
Sport Recife	2016	Série A	34	14	—		1	1	1	0	4	0	40	15
Sport Recife	2017	Série A	27	11	6	3	7	2	6	1	9	4	55	21
Sport Recife	Total		61	25	6	3	8	3	7	1	13	4	95	36
São Paulo	2018	Série A	32	12	13	3	4	0	2	1	—		50	16
São Paulo	2019	Série A	0	0	6	1	0	0	2	0	—		8	1
São Paulo	Total		32	12	19	4	4	0	4	1	—		58	17
Botafogo (loan)	2019	Série A	29	7	3	1	2	0	4	1	—		38	9
Grêmio	2020	Série A	25	13	11	9	6	4	10	2	—		52	28
Grêmio	2021	Série A	31	10	8	7	3	0	9 (Note: Three appearances and four goals in Copa Libertadores, six appearances and three goals in Copa Sudamericana)	7	—		51	24
Grêmio	2022	Série B	32	14	9	4	1	1	0	0	—		42	19
Grêmio	2023	Série A	0	0	8	0	2	0	—		—		10	0
Grêmio	Total		88	37	36	20	12	5	19	9	—		155	71
Sport Recife	2023	Série B	11	1	—		0	0	0	0	0	0	11	1
Career total			524	149	211	75	66	22	87	21	25	13	923	279

=== International ===
Appearances and goals by national team and year
National team	Year	Apps	Goals
Brazil	2009	1	0
Brazil	2010	0	0
Brazil	2011	1	0
Brazil	2012	0	0
Brazil	2013	0	0
Brazil	2014	0	0
Brazil	2015	0	0
Brazil	2016	0	0
Brazil	2017	5	2
Total		7	2

Scores and results list Brazil's goal tally first, score column indicates score after each Diego Souza goal.

List of international goals scored by Diego Souza
No.	Date	Venue	Opponent	Score	Result	Competition
1	13 June 2017	Melbourne Cricket Ground, Melbourne, Australia	Australia	1–0	4–0	Friendly
2	13 June 2017	Melbourne Cricket Ground, Melbourne, Australia	Australia	4–0	4–0	Friendly

== Honours ==
Fluminense

- Campeonato Carioca: 2005
- Primeira Liga: 2016

Flamengo

- Copa do Brasil: 2006

Grêmio

- Campeonato Gaúcho: 2007, 2020, 2021, 2022, 2023
- Recopa Gaúcha: 2021, 2022, 2023
- Copa do Brasil runner-up: 2020

Palmeiras

- Campeonato Paulista: 2008

Vasco da Gama

- Copa do Brasil: 2011

Sport

- Ariano Suassuna Trophy: 2017
- Campeonato Pernambucano: 2017

International

- Superclásico de las Américas: 2011

Individual

- Campeonato Brasileiro Série A Team of the Year: 2008, 2009, 2011
- Campeonato Brasileiro Série A Best Player: 2009
- Campeonato Brasileiro Série A top scorer: 2016
