= Bruno Alves (footballer, born 1991) =

Brazilian footballer

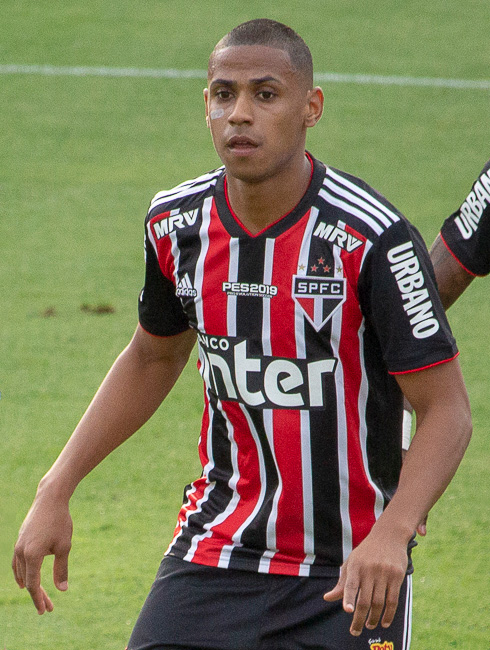
- Bruno Alves with São Paulo in 2018

Personal information
- Full name: Bruno Fabiano Alves
- Date of birth: 16 April 1991 (age 35)
- Place of birth: Jacareí, Brazil
- Height: 1.85 m (6 ft 1 in)
- Position: Centre-back

Team information
- Current team: Criciúma
- Number: 34

Youth career
- Primeira Camisa
- 2010–2011: Figueirense

Senior career*
Years	Team	Apps	(Gls)
2011–2017	Figueirense	103	(7)
2011	→ Ribeirão (loan)	8	(0)
2012	→ Metropolitano (loan)	0	(0)
2012	→ Barretos (loan)	0	(0)
2013	→ São José-SP (loan)	3	(0)
2013	→ CRAC (loan)	24	(0)
2017–2023	São Paulo	157	(4)
2022–2023	→ Grêmio (loan)	70	(5)
2023	Grêmio	40	(3)
2024–2025	Cuiabá	71	(8)
2026–	Criciúma	13	(2)
- * Club domestic league appearances and goals as of 18 July 2026

Bruno Fabiano Alves (born 16 April 1991) is a Brazilian professional footballer who plays as a centre-back for Criciúma.

== Club career ==
=== Figueirense ===
Born in Jacareí, São Paulo, Bruno Alves graduated from Figueirense's youth setup, and made his senior debut while on loan at Portuguese side G.D. Ribeirão, in 2011.

More loans subsequently followed, and he represented Metropolitano, Barretos, and São José-SP.

He joined CRAC.

Alves was included in the main squad of Figueira in 2014. He made his league debut for the club against SC Internacional on 19 April 2015. but only made his professional debut for the club in Serie A on 10 May of the following year, starting and being sent off after committing a penalty in a 1–4 away loss against Sport Recife for the Série A championship. He then subsequently became a regular starter for the club, suffering relegation in 2016.

=== São Paulo ===
On 21 August 2017, Alves signed a three-and-a-half-year contract with São Paulo in the top tier.

== Honours ==
=== Club ===
São Paulo

- Campeonato Paulista: 2021

Grêmio

- Campeonato Gaúcho: 2022, 2023
- Recopa Gaúcha: 2022, 2023

=== Individual ===
- Campeonato Paulista Team of the Year: 2019
