= Everton Galdino =

Brazilian footballer (born 1997)

Personal information
- Full name: Everton Galdino Moreira
- Date of birth: 17 March 1997 (age 29)
- Place of birth: Osasco, Brazil
- Height: 1.77 m (5 ft 10 in)
- Positions: Attacking midfielder; forward

Team information
- Current team: Vila Nova (on loan from FC Tokyo)
- Number: 17

Youth career
- 2014–2016: Vila Nova
- 2015: → São Paulo (loan)

Senior career*
Years	Team	Apps	(Gls)
2014–2017	Vila Nova	20	(1)
2017	→ Tombense (loan)	19	(2)
2018–2023	Tombense	126	(22)
2019	→ Ponte Preta (loan)	6	(0)
2020	→ Figueirense (loan)	12	(0)
2023	→ Grêmio (loan)	38	(8)
2024	Grêmio	0	(0)
2024	→ FC Tokyo (loan)	5	(0)
2025–	FC Tokyo	6	(0)
2026	→ Mirassol (loan)	13	(1)
2026–	→ Vila Nova (loan)	0	(0)
- * Club domestic league appearances and goals as of 9 April 2026

Everton Galdino Moreira (born 17 March 1997) is a Brazilian professional footballer who plays as either an attacking midfielder or a forward for Vila Nova, on loan from J1 League club FC Tokyo.

== Club career ==
Born in Osasco, São Paulo, Everton Galdino was a Vila Nova youth graduate. He made his first team debut on 28 November 2014, coming on as a late substitute in a 3–2 Série B away win over Portuguesa, as both sides were already relegated.

On 10 May 2017, Galdino was loaned to Tombense until the end of the Série C. He was bought by the club in November, and was regularly used afterwards.

On 18 August 2019, Everton Galdino was announced at Ponte Preta in the second division, on loan until the end of the year. He moved to Figueirense also in a temporary deal on 31 December, but had his loan terminated the following 9 November.

Upon returning to Tombense, Galdino was an undisputed starter, contributing with eight goals in the 2021 Série C as his side achieved a first-ever promotion to the second division. In the 2022 Série B, he was also a first-choice, and scored seven goals.

On 7 December 2022, Everton Galdino agreed to a one-year loan deal with Grêmio, with a buyout clause.

On 9 August 2024, Galdino was announced at FC Tokyo on a six month loan.

On 5 January 2025, Galdino was announced at FC Tokyo on a permanent transfer.

== Career statistics ==
As of 4 September 2023

Club	Season	League			State League		Cup		Continental		Other		Total	
Club	Season	Division	Apps	Goals	Apps	Goals	Apps	Goals	Apps	Goals	Apps	Goals	Apps	Goals
Vila Nova	2014	Série B	1	0	0	0	—		—		—		1	0
Vila Nova	2015	Série C	0	0	4	0	—		—		—		4	0
Vila Nova	2016	Série B	2	0	0	0	—		—		—		2	0
Vila Nova	2017	Série B	0	0	13	1	2	0	—		—		15	1
Vila Nova	Subtotal		3	0	17	1	2	0	—		—		22	1
Tombense	2017	Série C	19	2	—		—		—		—		19	2
Tombense	2018	Série C	9	0	9	1	—		—		—		18	1
Tombense	2019	Série C	15	3	10	1	2	0	—		—		27	4
Tombense	2020	Série C	4	0	—		—		—		—		4	0
Tombense	2021	Série C	23	8	8	0	1	0	—		—		32	8
Tombense	2022	Série B	35	7	13	2	3	0	—		—		51	9
Tombense	Subtotal		105	20	40	4	6	0	—		—		151	24
Ponte Preta (loan)	2019	Série B	6	0	—		—		—		—		6	0
Figueirense (loan)	2020	Série B	8	0	4	0	2	0	—		—		14	0
Grêmio (loan)	2023	Série A	12	2	10	2	4	1	—		0	0	26	5
Career total			134	22	71	7	14	1	0	0	0	0	219	30

== Honours ==
Vila Nova

- Campeonato Goiano - Segunda Divisão: 2015

Grêmio

- Recopa Gaúcha: 2023
- Campeonato Gaúcho: 2023, 2024
