= Adriel (disambiguation) =

Adriel is a biblical nobleman in the ancient kingdom of Israel.

Adriel may also refer to:

- Adriel (name), given name
- Adriel (footballer, born 1997), Adriel Tadeu Ferreira da Silva, Brazilian football defender
- Adriel (footballer, born 2001), Adriel Vasconcelos Ramos, Brazilian football goalkeeper
- Adriel (footballer, born 2006), Adriel Gomes do Nascimento, Brazilian football midfielder
