= Adriel (name) =

Male given name

Adriel is a given name, derived from the Biblical nobleman Adriel. Notable people with the name include:

- Adriel N. Williams (1916–2004), United States Air Force Brigadier General
- Adriel Johnson (1957–2010), American biologist
- Adriel Brathwaite (born 1962), Barbadian politician and lawyer
- Adriel Hampton (born 1978), American entrepreneur, strategist, and political figure
- A. J. Green (born 1988), Adriel Jeremiah Green, American gridiron football wide receiver
- Adriel Ba Loua (born 1996), Cameroonian football midfielder
- AJ George (born 1996), Adriel Jared George, Antiguan football midfielder
- Adriel (footballer, born 1997), Adriel Tadeu Ferreira da Silva, Brazilian football defender
- Adriel Sanes (born 1998), American Virgin Islander swimmer
- Adriel (footballer, born 2001), Adriel Vasconcelos Ramos, Brazilian football goalkeeper
