= Franco Cristaldo =

Argentine footballer

Personal information
- Full name: Franco Sebastián Cristaldo
- Date of birth: 15 August 1996 (age 30)
- Place of birth: Morón, Argentina
- Height: 1.70 m (5 ft 7 in)
- Position: Attacking midfielder

Team information
- Current team: Talleres
- Number: 18

Youth career
- Boca Juniors

Senior career*
| Years | Team | Apps | (Gls) |
| 2014–2021 | Boca Juniors | 11 | (1) |
| 2016 | → Elche (loan) | 18 | (1) |
| 2016 | → Rayo Vallecano (loan) | 12 | (1) |
| 2017–2018 | → Defensa y Justicia (loan) | 9 | (0) |
| 2018–2019 | → San Martín SJ (loan) | 15 | (0) |
| 2019–2020 | → Central Córdoba SdE (loan) | 17 | (0) |
| 2020–2021 | → Huracán (loan) | 48 | (6) |
| 2022 | Huracán | 33 | (13) |
| 2023–2026 | Grêmio | 132 | (25) |
| 2026– | Talleres | 21 | (1) |

International career
| 2012 | Argentina U17 | 2 | (0) |
- * Club domestic league appearances and goals as of 17:42, 15 November 2026 (UTC)

Franco Sebastián Cristaldo (born 15 August 1996) is an Argentine professional footballer who plays mainly as an attacking midfielder for Talleres.

== Club career ==
Born in Morón, Buenos Aires, Cristaldo was a Boca Juniors youth graduate. On 16 November 2014, he made his first team debut, coming on as a second-half substitute for Luciano Acosta in a 1–1 away draw against Arsenal de Sarandí.

Cristaldo was definitely promoted to the main squad in January 2015 by manager Rodolfo Arruabarrena. He scored his first professional goal on 29 March, netting the last in a 3–0 home win against Estudiantes de la Plata.

On 11 January 2016, Cristaldo joined Elche CF in Segunda División, on loan until the end of the season.

== Honours ==
Boca Juniors

- Argentine Primera División: 2015

Grêmio

- Campeonato Gaúcho: 2023, 2024
- Recopa Gaúcha: 2023, 2025
