= Gustavinho =

Gustavinho is a nickname, a diminutive for Gustavo. It may refer to:

- Gustavinho (basketball) (born 1980), Gustavo de Conti, Brazilian basketball coach and former player
- Gustavinho (footballer, born 1982), Gustavo Nacarato Veronesi, Brazilian football midfielder
- Gustavinho (footballer, born 2001), Gustavo César Mendonça Gravino, Brazilian football midfielder
- Gustavinho (footballer, born 2004), Gustavo Ribeiro Neves, Brazilian football forward
