= Gustavinho (footballer, born 2001) =

Brazilian footballer

Personal information
- Full name: Gustavo César Mendonça Gravino
- Date of birth: 29 October 2001 (age 25)
- Place of birth: Juiz de Fora, Brazil
- Height: 1.74 m (5 ft 9 in)
- Position: Midfielder

Team information
- Current team: Athletic

Youth career
- 2010–2013: Sport Juiz de Fora
- 2014–2017: Cruzeiro
- 2017–2020: América Mineiro

Senior career*
Years	Team	Apps	(Gls)
2021–2026	América Mineiro	37	(1)
2023	→ Grêmio (loan)	9	(0)
2026–	Athletic	9	(0)
- * Club domestic league appearances and goals as of 01:37, 10 March 2026 (UTC)

Gustavo César Mendonça Gravino (born 29 October 2001), commonly known as Gustavinho, is a Brazilian footballer who plays as a midfielder for Athletic.

== Club career ==
Born in Juiz de Fora, Minas Gerais, Gustavinho joined Cruzeiro's youth setup at the age of 13, from hometown side Sport Juiz de Fora. Released by the club in 2017, he stayed three months without a club before joining América Mineiro.

On 12 November 2020, Gustavinho renewed his contract until December 2022. He made his professional debut the following 9 January, coming on as a late substitute for Juninho in a 4–0 Série B home routing of Vitória.

== Career statistics ==
As of 30 May 2022

Club	Season	League			State League		Cup		Continental		Other		Total	
Club	Season	Division	Apps	Goals	Apps	Goals	Apps	Goals	Apps	Goals	Apps	Goals	Apps	Goals
América Mineiro	2020	Série B	1	0	0	0	0	0	—		—		1	0
América Mineiro	2021	Série A	5	0	11	0	2	0	—		—		18	0
América Mineiro	2022	Série A	3	0	9	1	1	0	3 (Note: Appearance(s) in Copa Libertadores)	0	—		16	1
Career total			9	0	20	1	3	0	3	0	0	0	35	1

== Honours ==
=== Club ===
Grêmio

- Campeonato Gaúcho: 2023
- Recopa Gaúcha: 2023
