= Wesley (footballer, born 2002) =

Brazilian footballer (born 2002)

Personal information
- Full name: Wesley da Conceição Duarte Moreira
- Date of birth: 2 June 2002 (age 24)
- Place of birth: Encruzilhada do Sul, Brazil
- Height: 1.78 m (5 ft 10 in)
- Position: Forward

Team information
- Current team: Veres Rivne
- Number: 11

Youth career
- 2010–2021: Grêmio

Senior career*
Years	Team	Apps	(Gls)
2021–2023	Grêmio	3	(0)
2021	→ Pelotas (loan)	10	(0)
2022	→ CRB (loan)	5	(0)
2023	→ Caxias (loan)	9	(2)
2023–2024	Coritiba	40	(1)
2023	→ Ituano (loan)	18	(3)
2025	Ferroviária	9	(0)
2025–	Veres Rivne	16	(0)
- * Club domestic league appearances and goals as of 3 June 2026

Wesley da Conceição Duarte Moreira (born 2 June 2002), known as Wesley Pombo or just Wesley, is a Brazilian professional footballer who plays as a forward for Ukrainian Premier League club Veres Rivne.

== Club career ==
=== Grêmio ===
Born in Encruzilhada do Sul, Brazil, Wesley joined the Grêmio's Academy at the age of 12 in 2010.

== Career statistics ==
=== Club ===
As of 19 April 2023.

Appearances and goals by club, season and competition
Club	Season	League			State League		National Cup		Continental		Other		Total	
Club	Season	Division	Apps	Goals	Apps	Goals	Apps	Goals	Apps	Goals	Apps	Goals	Apps	Goals
Grêmio	2021	Série A	0	0	—		—		—		—		0	0
Grêmio	2022	Série B	0	0	3 (Note: Appearance(s) in Campeonato Gaúcho.)	0	0	0	—		—		3	0
Grêmio	Total		0	0	3	0	0	0	—		—		3	0
Pelotas (loan)	2021	Gaúcho	—		10	0	—		—		—		10	0
CRB (loan)	2022	Série B	5	0	—		—		—		—		5	0
Caxias (loan)	2023	Série D	0	0	9	2	—		—		—		9	2
Career total			5	0	22	2	0	0	0	0	0	0	27	2

== Honours ==
Grêmio

- Campeonato Gaúcho: 2022
