= Adriel Johnson =

American biologist (1957–2010)

- Born: Adriel Duland Johnson; June 22, 1957; Tuskegee, Alabama, US
- Died: February 12, 2010 (aged 52); Huntsville, Alabama, US

Academic background
- Education: Washington University in St. Louis; Tennessee Technological University; North Carolina State University

Academic work
- Discipline: Cell biology Nutritional physiology

Adriel Duland Johnson Sr. (June 22, 1957 – February 12, 2010) was an American biologist and faculty member at the University of Alabama in Huntsville whose research focused on areas of cell biology and nutritional physiology. He was one of three faculty members who were killed in the shooting on the UAH campus on February 12, 2010.

Johnson was a native of Tuskegee, Alabama, and attended the Chamblis Children's House Elementary School, which was housed on the campus of Tuskegee Institute. Johnson was a Boy Scout and participated in the medical explorers Program. He was a lifelong member of the National Eagle Scout Association. Johnson graduated from Washington University in St. Louis in 1979 with a degree in biology. He was one of just a handful of African-American students at the university at the time.

Johnson earned two master's degrees: one in biology-population genetics from Tennessee Technological University in 1981, and the second in biology-muscle protein biochemistry from UAHuntsville in 1986. Johnson earned a PhD in animal science/nutritional physiology from North Carolina State University in 1989. Johnson was the principal investigator of the Louis Stokes Alliance for Minority Participation program site at the University of Alabama in Huntsville for over nineteen years. In addition to mentoring youth in scouting and academia, Johnson served many others through advisement of numerous student groups and participation in various committees. The Alabama Academy of Science established the Adriel D. Johnson, Sr. Mentoring Award in 2023 in honor of his mentoring at the high school and collegiate levels.

== Selected research citations ==
- "An embryonic chick pancreas organ culture model: characterization and neural control of exocrine release", Autonomic Neuroscience: Basic and Clinical, Volume 105, Issue 2, Pages 118–130; 30 May 2003, Connie A Meachama, Adriel D Johnson Sr.
- "The involvement of slaframine and swainsonine in slobbers syndrome: a review" Journal of Animal Science, Journal of Animal Science, (1995) Vol 73, Issue 5 1499–1508. W. J. Croom Jr, W. M. Hagler Jr, M. A. Froetschel and A. D. Johnson.
