= Adriel N. Williams =

United States Air Force general (1916 – 2004)

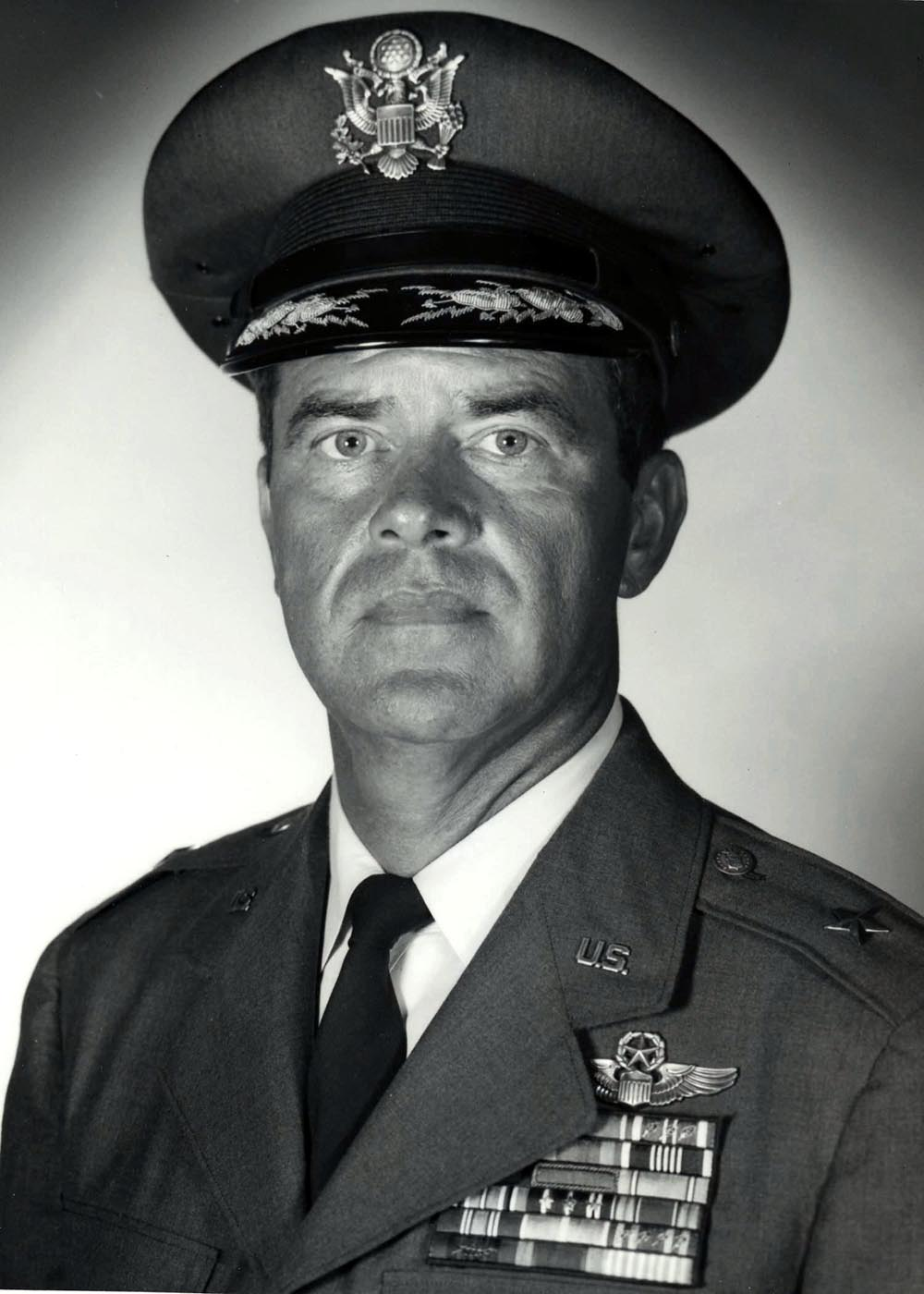
- Born: August 11, 1916; Shelby County, Kentucky
- Died: July 8, 2004 (aged 87); San Antonio, Texas
- Military career
- Allegiance: United States of America
- Branch: United States Air Force
- Service years: 1939–1968
- Rank: Brigadier General
- Awards: Legion of Merit, Distinguished Flying Cross, Air Medal, Presidential Unit Citation, French Croix de Guerre, The Most Exalted Order of the White Elephant

Brigadier General Adriel Newton Williams (August 11, 1916 – July 8, 2004) was a United States Air Force Brigadier General who was Director of Transportation, Headquarters U.S. Air Force, Washington, D.C.

== Early life and education ==
Williams was born 1916 in Shelby County, Kentucky. He graduated from Shelbyville High School, 1933 and from Eastern Kentucky University in 1938. After graduation, he entered the "West Point of the Air" Randolph Field, Texas, for pilot training and received his pilot wings in 1939 at Kelly Field, Texas.

== Military career ==
Williams was assigned as commanding officer of the First Transport Squadron in March 1942, and in the next nine months commanded the squadron at Patterson Field, Ohio, General Mitchell Field, in Milwaukee, and Pope Field, Fort Bragg. Following this assignment he became commander of the 436th Troop Carrier Group and remained as such throughout the remainder of World War II. This group pioneered in the early assault glider operations, participating in all major airborne assault operations in the European Theater. These included the Normandy invasion (D-Day), of southern France, the Nijmegen-Eindhoven, the Netherlands operation, resupply to the beleaguered 101st in Bastogne, and the crossing of the Rhine.

Following V-E Day, Williams returned to the United States with the 436th Troop Carrier Group, where the unit was to be reequipped with C-46s for duty in the Pacific theater. However, the war ended while the changes were being made and the 436th Troop Carrier Group was inactivated. Williams was then assigned as commander of the 434th Troop Carrier Group, located at George Army Air Field, Lawrenceville, Illinois, and later Greenville Air Base, South Carolina. He remained as commander until the 434th Group was inactivated in summer of 1947.

Williams attended the Armed Forces Staff College in Norfolk, Virginia, and upon graduation was assigned as commander of the 62nd Troop Carrier Group at McChord Air Force Base in Washington. He remained in command until July 1950 when he became assistant deputy chief of staff, operations, Tactical Air Command, Langley Air Force Base, Virginia. He remained in this assignment until receiving orders to the Air War College, Maxwell Air Force Base in 1952.

He graduated from the Air War College in June 1953 and was assigned commander of the Far East Air Forces, 315th Troop Carrier Wing, Brady Air Base, Kyushu, Japan. He was reassigned as commanding officer, 374th Troop Carrier Wing, Tachikawa Air Base, Japan, in March 1954, in which during the period the unit saw operation in the French Indo-Chinese War.

Upon his return from his duty in Japan, Williams was assigned to command the 314th Troop Carrier Wing, Sewart Air Force Base, Tennessee. In July 1957, he was assigned as inspector general, Headquarters Tactical Air Command, Langley Air Force Base, Virginia. At this point in his career, with the exception of the three school assignments, General Williams had been either directly in command of a troop carrier organization or in staff work directly concerned with airborne operations. He worked closely with such units as the 11th, 82d, and 101st airborne divisions. In early 1940 he was copilot on the aircraft that dropped the first Army paratrooper at Fort Benning, Georgia.

He graduated from the National War College in Washington, D.C., in 1959. Following graduation he was assigned to the Directorate of Plans, Deputy Chief of Staff, Plans and Programs, Headquarters U.S. Air Force, as assistant deputy director for policy. In August 1960, he became the deputy director for policy and on April 22, 1961, he was promoted to brigadier general He served in the Pentagon until he was assigned as the commander, Air Rescue Service in August 1963. He served as vice commander, Eastern Transport Air Force (Military Air Transport Service) (now Twenty-First Air Force, Military Airlift Command) from March 1965 to July 1966. General Williams assumed duties as director of Transportation, Headquarters U.S. Air Force in Washington, D.C. in August 1966.

His military decorations include the Legion of Merit with two oak leaf clusters, Distinguished Flying Cross with three oak leaf clusters, Air Medal, Presidential Unit Citation, French Croix de Guerre with Palm, and The Most Exalted Order of the White Elephant, Thailand. Williams, a command pilot, retired at the rank of Brigadier General on August 1, 1968.

Williams was married to Mary Daly and resided in Texas. He died in San Antonio, Texas, in 2004.
