= Rogério Zimmermann =

Brazilian football manager (born 1965)

Personal information
- Full name: Rogério Garcia Zimmermann
- Date of birth: 10 June 1965 (age 61)
- Place of birth: Porto Alegre, Brazil
- Position: Right-back

Team information
- Current team: Novo Hamburgo (head coach)

Youth career
- Years: Team
- Cruzeiro-RS
- São José-RS

Managerial career
- 1983–1989: São José-RS (youth)
- 1990–2000: Grêmio (youth)
- 2002–2003: ECUS
- 2004–2006: Brasil de Pelotas
- 2006: Ulbra
- 2007: Santa Cruz-RS
- 2008: Pelotas
- 2008–2009: Cabense
- 2010: Cabense
- 2011–2012: Canoas
- 2012–2017: Brasil de Pelotas
- 2017–2018: Joinville
- 2018: Brasil de Pelotas
- 2019: Brasil de Pelotas
- 2020: Botafogo-PB
- 2021: Esportivo
- 2022: Caxias
- 2023: Brasil de Pelotas
- 2024: São Caetano
- 2024–2025: São José-RS
- 2025–: Novo Hamburgo

Rogério Garcia Zimmermann (born 10 June 1965) is a Brazilian football coach and former player who played as a right-back. He is the current head coach of Novo Hamburgo.

== Career ==
Born in Porto Alegre, Rio Grande do Sul, Zimmermann played for the youth sides of Cruzeiro-RS and São José-RS, but never played as a senior and began his coaching career with the youth sides of the latter. In 1990, he joined Grêmio, and coached their youth setup for ten years.

Zimmermann's first senior coaching experience occurred at ECUS in 2002, and he was named at the helm of Brasil de Pelotas in January 2004. He was sacked on 22 January 2006, and subsequently took over Ulbra.

After being in charge of Santa Cruz-RS, Pelotas and Cabense, Zimmermann returned to Ulbra in 2011, with the club now named Canoas. On 21 May 2012, he was presented back at Brasil de Pelotas.

On 8 December 2014, after achieving promotion to the Série C, Zimmermann renewed his contract with the Xavante. He further extended his link exactly one year later, after another promotion.

On 20 July 2017, after more than five years in charge, Zimmermann was sacked from Brasil. He was named head coach of Joinville on 13 September, but was dismissed on 12 March 2018.

On 29 August 2018, Zimmermann returned to Brasil for a third spell, and left the club at the end of the season, after avoiding relegation. He returned to the club on 27 March 2019, but resigned on 9 July.

On 10 August 2020, Zimmermann was announced as head coach of Botafogo-PB in the third division. Sacked on 1 November, he was presented at Esportivo back in his home state on 19 March 2021, but resigned after just three matches.

On 27 October 2021, Zimmermann was announced as head coach of Caxias for the upcoming season. He was relieved from his duties the following 15 March, and returned to Brasil for a fifth spell on 12 October 2022.

After leaving Brasil on 9 August 2023, Zimmermann took over São Caetano on 2 February 2024, but was sacked on 21 March, after the club's relegation from the Campeonato Paulista Série A3. On 5 July, he returned to São José-RS, now as head coach of the main squad.

== Managerial statistics ==
As of 7 March 2026

Managerial record by team and tenure
Team	Nat	From	To	Record							
Team	Nat	From	To	G	W	D	L	GF	GA	GD	Win %
Brasil de Pelotas	(Brazil)	1 January 2004	22 January 2006	58	28	17	13	94	50	+44	48.28
Brasil de Pelotas	(Brazil)	21 May 2012	20 July 2017	221	88	74	59	269	207	+62	39.82
Brasil de Pelotas	(Brazil)	29 August 2018	26 November 2018	14	8	1	5	16	11	+5	57.14
Brasil de Pelotas	(Brazil)	27 March 2019	9 July 2019	8	3	0	5	5	7	−2	37.50
Brasil de Pelotas	(Brazil)	19 January 2023	7 August 2023	31	10	11	10	28	26	+2	32.26
São Caetano	(Brazil)	2 February 2024	21 March 2024	12	2	2	8	11	18	−7	16.67
São José	(Brazil)	5 July 2024	17 February 2025	30	8	13	9	30	28	+2	26.67
Novo Hamburgo	(Brazil)	23 June 2025	present	25	10	10	5	33	18	+15	40.00
Career total				399	157	128	114	486	365	+121	39.35

== Honours ==
Brasil de Pelotas

- Campeonato Gaúcho Série B: 2013

São José

- Copa FGF: 2024
