= Erick Farias =

Brazilian footballer (born 1997)

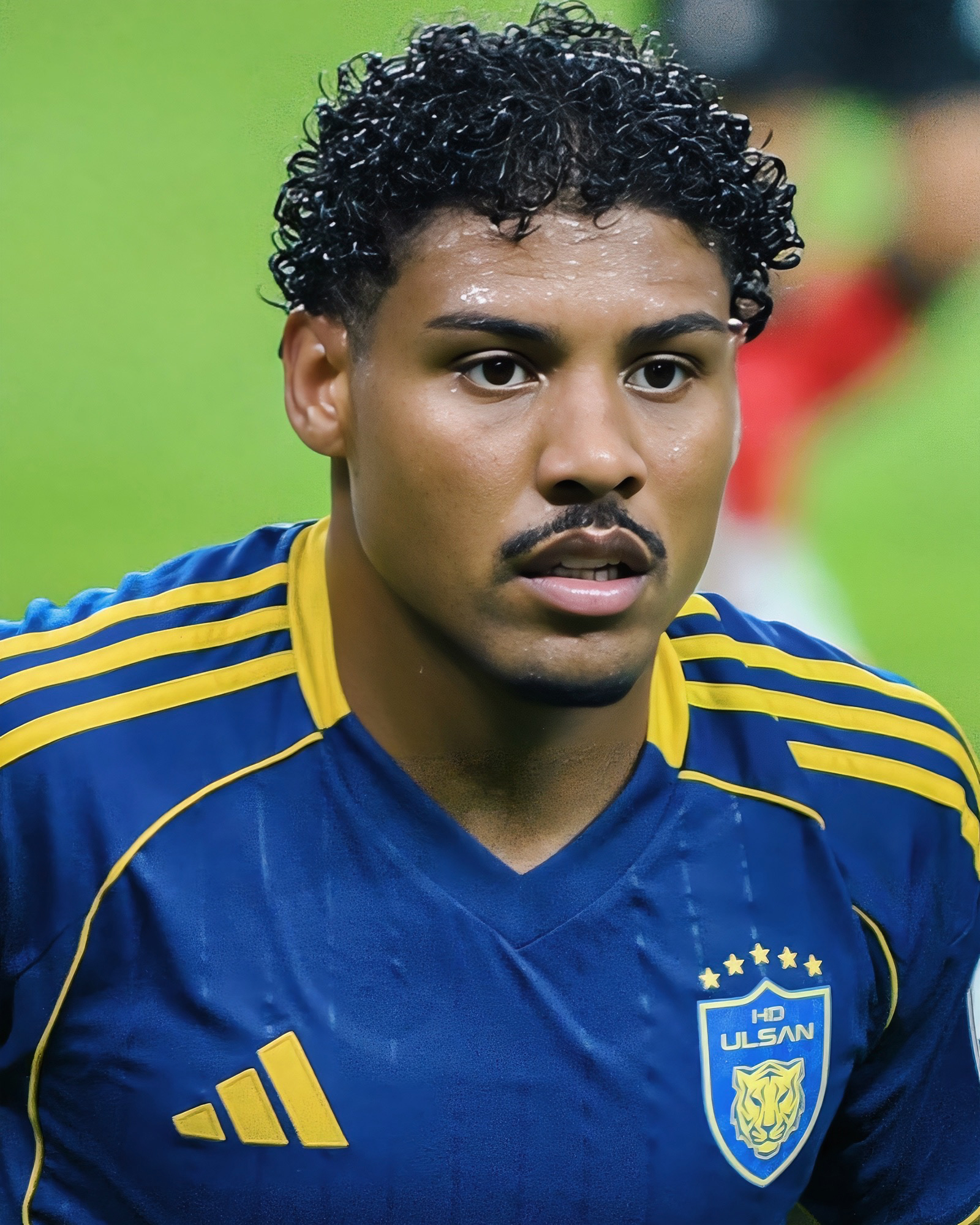
- Farias in 2026

Personal information
- Full name: Erick Samuel Corrêa Farias
- Date of birth: 3 January 1997 (age 29)
- Place of birth: Pelotas, Brazil
- Height: 1.74 m (5 ft 9 in)
- Position: Forward

Team information
- Current team: Ulsan HD
- Number: 11

Youth career
- Sudeste
- 2010–2017: Grêmio

Senior career*
Years	Team	Apps	(Gls)
2017–2018	Vejle	8	(0)
2018	Boa Esporte	10	(0)
2018	Pelotas	0	(0)
2019	Glória	17	(2)
2019	Hercílio Luz	2	(0)
2019	Inter de Lages	7	(2)
2019–2020	Avenida	3	(0)
2021	Nova Mutum	11	(2)
2021–2023	Ypiranga-RS	59	(20)
2022–2023	→ Vasco da Gama (loan)	16	(1)
2023–2025	Juventude	21	(5)
2025–	Ulsan HD	32	(10)
- * Club domestic league appearances and goals as of 3 August 2026

Erick Samuel Corrêa Farias (born 3 January 1997), known as Erick Farias or just Erick, is a Brazilian professional footballer who plays as a forward for Ulsan HD.

== Career ==
Born in Pelotas, Rio Grande do Sul, Erick joined Grêmio's youth setup at the age of 13, from hometown side Sudeste FC. On 31 August 2017, he moved abroad and signed for Vejle Boldklub of the Danish 1st Division.

Erick left Vejle on 20 January 2018, and was announced at Série B side Boa Esporte just hours later. Rarely used with the latter, he ended the season with hometown side Pelotas, playing in the Copa FGF.

Erick began the 2019 campaign with Glória, but subsequently played for Hercílio Luz, Inter de Lages and Avenida during the year. He left the latter club in March 2020, amidst the COVID-19 pandemic in Brazil, and signed with Nova Mutum on 4 September 2020.

On 25 May 2021, Erick returned to his home state after agreeing to a one-year deal with Ypiranga-RS. He immediately became a regular starter, being the top scorer of the 2022 Campeonato Gaúcho with six goals.

On 6 April 2022, Erick agreed to a one-year loan deal with Vasco da Gama in the Série B. He scored once in 14 appearances as the club achieved promotion to the Série A, but had his loan terminated on 6 February 2023.

On 3 August 2023, after scoring nine goals for Ypiranga in the 2023 Série C, Erick signed a three-and-a-half-year contract with Juventude in the second division. He again achieved top tier promotion with his new side, scoring twice in 13 appearances.

== Career statistics ==
As of 19 February 2024

Appearances and goals by club, season and competition
Club	Season	League			State League		Cup		Continental		Other		Total	
Club	Season	Division	Apps	Goals	Apps	Goals	Apps	Goals	Apps	Goals	Apps	Goals	Apps	Goals
Vejle	2017–18	Danish 1st Division	8	0	—		—		—		—		8	0
Boa Esporte	2018	Série B	5	0	5	0	0	0	—		—		10	0
Pelotas	2018	Gaúcho Série A2	—		—		—		—		12 (Note: CRS)	0	12	0
Glória	2019	Gaúcho Série A2	—		17	5	—		—		—		17	5
Hercílio Luz	2019	Série D	2	0	—		—		—		—		2	0
Inter de Lages	2019	Catarinense Série B	—		7	2	—		—		—		7	2
Avenida	2019	Série D	—		—		—		—		7 (Note: CRS)	0	7	0
Avenida	2020	Gaúcho Série A2	—		3	0	—		—		—		3	0
Avenida	Total		—		3	0	—		—		7	0	10	0
Nova Mutum	2021	Série D	0	0	11	2	1	0	—		—		12	2
Ypiranga-RS	2021	Série C	23	0	—		—		—		—		34	3
Ypiranga-RS	2022	Série C	0	0	15	6	—		—		—		15	6
Ypiranga-RS	2023	Série C	14	9	7	5	4	1	—		—		25	15
Ypiranga-RS	Total		37	9	22	11	4	1	—		—		63	21
Vasco da Gama (loan)	2022	Série B	14	1	—		—		—		—		14	1
Vasco da Gama (loan)	2023	Série A	0	0	2	0	0	0	—		—		2	0
Vasco da Gama (loan)	Total		14	1	2	0	0	0	—		—		16	1
Juventude	2023	Série B	13	2	—		—		—		—		13	2
Juventude	2024	Série A	0	0	8	3	0	0	—		—		8	3
Juventude	Total		13	2	8	3	0	0	—		—		21	5
Career total			79	12	75	23	5	1	0	0	19	0	178	36

== Honours ==
Vejle

- Danish 1st Division: 2017–18
