= Estádio Olímpico Colosso da Lagoa =

Colosso da Lagoa
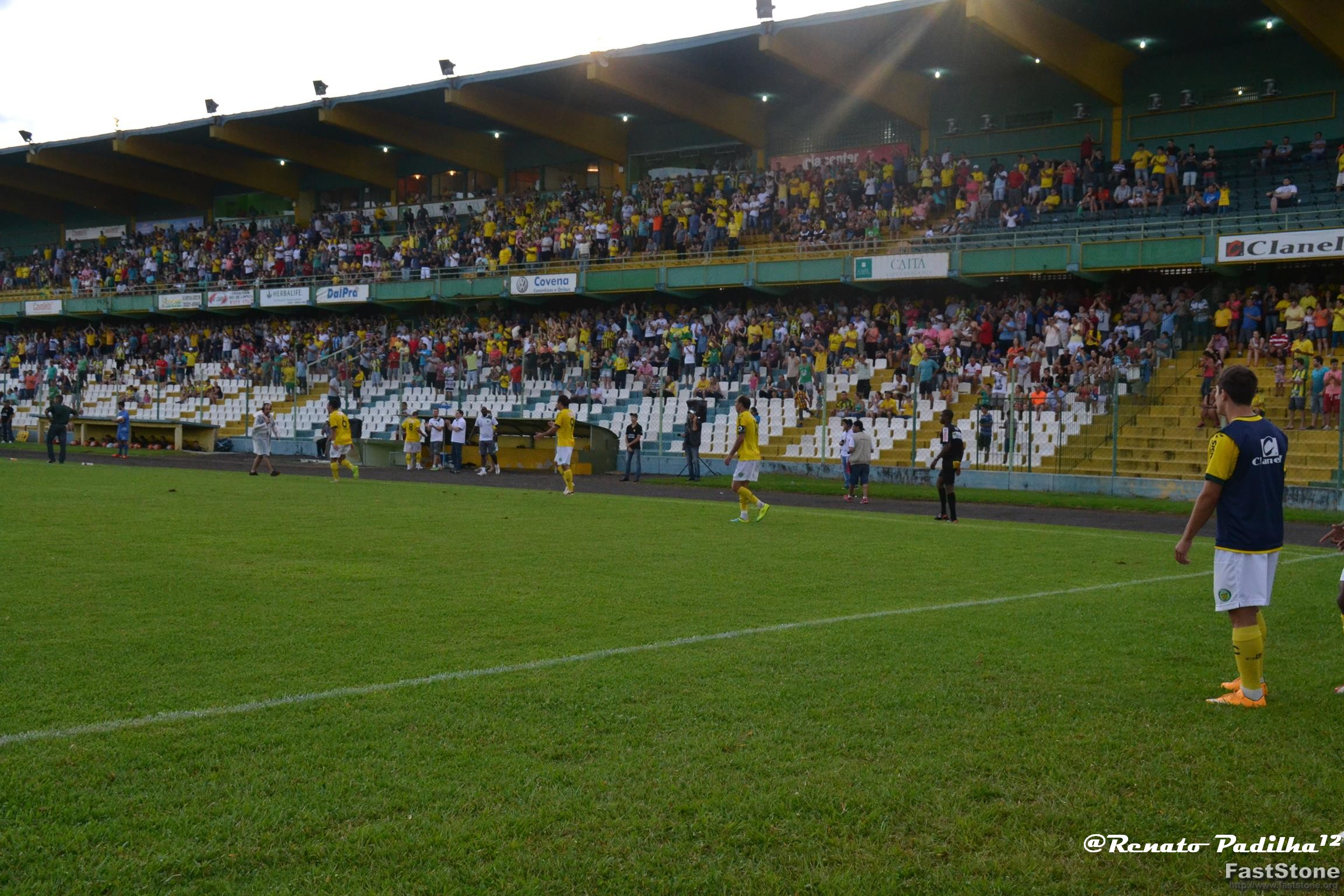
- Sisbrace
- Interactive map of Colosso da Lagoa
- Full name: Estádio Olímpico Colosso da Lagoa
- Location: Erechim, Rio Grande do Sul, Brazil
- Coordinates: 27°39′03.64″S 52°15′54.14″W
- Owner: Ypiranga Futebol Clube
- Capacity: 22,000

Construction
- Built: 1970
- Opened: September 2, 1970

Tenant
- Ypiranga Futebol Clube

Estádio Olímpico Colosso da Lagoa is a multi-use stadium in Erechim, Brazil. It is currently used mostly for football matches. The stadium, built in 1970, holds 22,000 and is owned by Ypiranga Futebol Clube. It is named after the Lagoa Vermelha (meaning Red Lake), which is located near the stadium.

== History ==
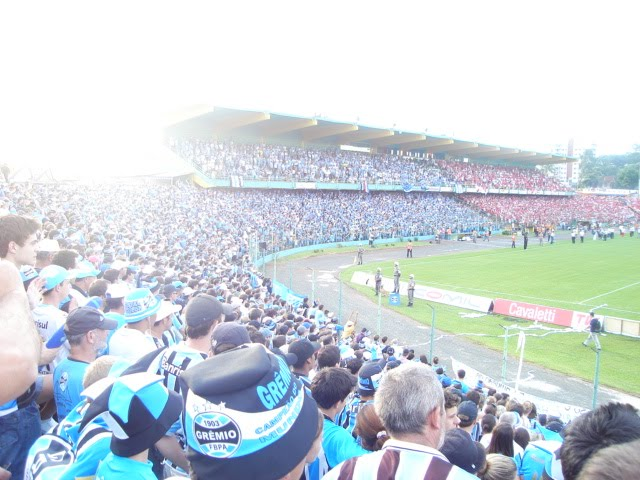
A game in the Colosso da Lagoa

In 1970, the works on Colosso da Lagoa were completed. The inaugural match was played on September 2 of that year, when Santos beat Grêmio 2–0. The first goal of the stadium was scored by Santos' Pelé, who received a trophy awarded by Rádio Tupi after the match.

The stadium's attendance record currently stands at 25,000, set on August 18, 1974 when Internacional beat Ypiranga 2–0.
