= Estádio Passo D'Areia =

Multi-use stadium in Porto Alegre, Brazil

Coordinates: 30°00′23.92″S 51°10′24.93″W

Passo D'Areia
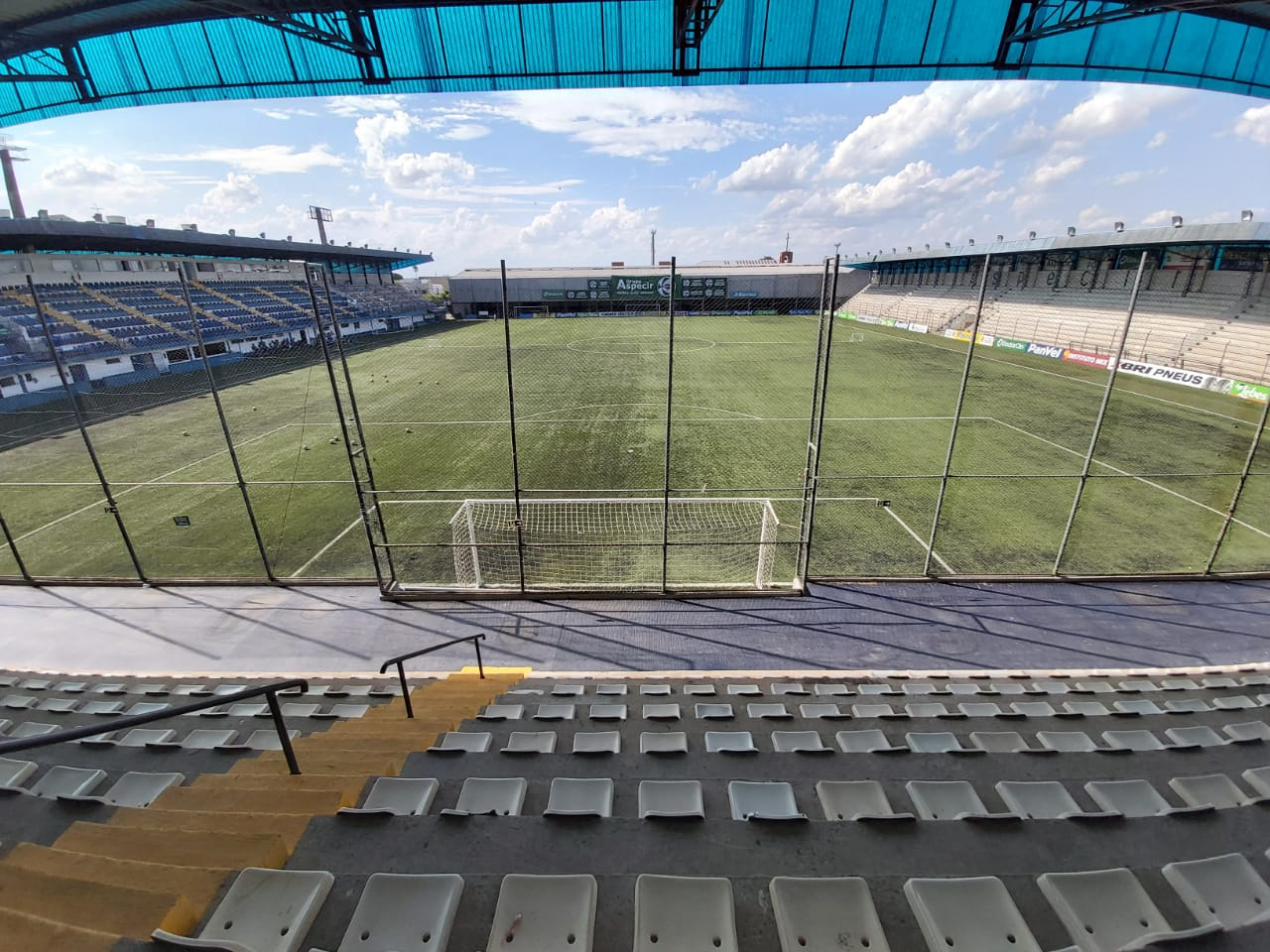
- View of inside the stadium from the stands behind the goal
- Interactive map of Passo D'Areia
- Full name: Estádio Francisco Novelletto Neto
- Location: Porto Alegre, Rio Grande do Sul, Brazil
- Owner: Esporte Clube São José
- Operator: Esporte Clube São José
- Capacity: 10,600
- Surface: Artificial Grass
- Field size: 105 x 68 m

Construction
- Built: 1939 to 1940
- Opened: 24 March 1940

Tenant
- Esporte Clube São José

Estádio Francisco Novelletto Neto, better known as Estádio Passo D'Areia is a multi-use stadium located in Porto Alegre, Brazil. It is used mostly for football matches and hosts the home matches of Esporte Clube São José. The stadium has a maximum capacity of 16,000 people and was built in 1940. In 2020 the stadium was renamed after Francisco Novelletto Neto, who was president of Esporte Clube São José and the Federação Gaúcha de Futebol.
