= 2023 Campeonato Gaúcho =

Campeonato Gaúcho
- Season: 2023
- Dates: 21 January – 8 April 2023
- Teams: 12
- Champions: Grêmio
- Relegated: Esportivo; Aimoré
- Matches: 72
- Goals: 158 (2.19 per match)
- Top goalscorer: (Brazil) Pedro Henrique (8 goals)

The 2023 Campeonato da Primeira Divisão de Futebol Profissional da FGF - Divisão Especial - Série A1, better known as the 2023 Campeonato Gaúcho (officially the Gauchão Ipiranga 2023 for sponsorship reasons), was the 103rd season of Rio Grande do Sul's top flight football league. The competition was played from 21 January to 8 April 2023. 12 clubs contested in the Campeonato Gaúcho. Grêmio were the fifth-time defending champion.

== Teams ==
A total of 12 teams competed in the 2023 Série A1 season.

Club	City	Stadium	Capacity	Pos. in 2022	1st season	Titles	Last title	First title
Aimoré	São Leopoldo	Cristo Rei	12,000	8th	1961	—	—	—
Avenida	Santa Cruz do Sul	Estádio dos Eucaliptos	20,000	2nd (2nd division)	1979	—	—	—
Brasil de Pelotas	Pelotas	Bento Freitas	18,000	4th	1919	1	1919	1919
Caxias	Caxias do Sul	Centenário	22,132	5th	1961	1	2000	2000
Esportivo	Bento Gonçalves	Montanha dos Vinhedos	15,269	1st (2nd division)	1970	—	—	—
Grêmio	Porto Alegre	Arena do Grêmio	55,225	1st	1919	41	2022	1922
Internacional	Porto Alegre	Beira-Rio	50,128	3rd	1927	45	2016	1927
Juventude	Caxias do Sul	Alfredo Jaconi	23,726	10th	1925	1	1998	1998
Novo Hamburgo	Novo Hamburgo	Estádio do Vale	6,500	7th	1930	1	2017	2017
São José	Porto Alegre	Passo D'Areia	8,000	6th	1961	—	—	—
São Luiz	Ijuí	19 de Outubro	14,000	9th	1974	—	—	—
Ypiranga	Erechim	Colosso da Lagoa	30,000	2nd	1968	—	—	—

Location of teams in 2023 Campeonato Gaúcho

=== Personnel ===
Club	Manager
Aimoré	Pingo
Avenida	Márcio Nunes
Brasil de Pelotas	Rogério Zimmermann
Caxias	Thiago Carvalho
Esportivo	Carlos Moraes
Grêmio	Renato Portaluppi
Internacional	Mano Menezes
Juventude	Celso Roth
Novo Hamburgo	Edinho Rosa
São José	Thiago Gomes
São Luiz	William Campos
Ypiranga	Luizinho Vieira

== First stage ==
=== Table ===
Pos	Team	Pld	W	D	L	GF	GA	GD	Pts	Qualification or relegation
1	Grêmio	11	9	2	0	22	5	+17	29	Qualification to Knockout stage
2	Internacional	11	6	4	1	22	8	+14	22	Qualification to Knockout stage
3	Caxias	11	5	5	1	19	11	+8	20	Qualification to Knockout stage
4	Ypiranga	11	5	3	3	17	15	+2	18	Qualification to Knockout stage
5	Juventude	11	4	5	2	17	14	+3	17	
6	São José	11	4	4	3	11	12	−1	16	
7	Brasil de Pelotas	11	3	4	4	6	8	−2	13	
8	Novo Hamburgo	11	2	5	4	7	13	−6	11	
9	Avenida	11	2	4	5	7	11	−4	10	
10	São Luiz	11	2	4	5	6	13	−7	10	
11	Esportivo (R)	11	1	3	7	6	19	−13	6	Relegation to Série A2
12	Aimoré (R)	11	1	1	9	5	16	−11	4	Relegation to Série A2

Updated to match(es) played on unknown. Source: Soccerway
Rules for classification: 1) Points; 2) Wins; 3) Goal difference; 4) Goals scored; 5) fewest red cards; 6) fewest yellow cards; 7) Draw in the headquarters of the FGF.
(R) Relegated

=== Results ===
Home \ Away	AIM	AVE	BRA	CAX	ESP	GRE	INT	JUV	NHA	SJO	SLU	YPI
Aimoré					0–0		0–2		0–1	0–1		1–2
Avenida	0–1			0–1	1–2		1–1				1–0	1–0
Brasil de Pelotas	1–0	1–1		0–0			0–1				1–0	
Caxias	2–1				3–1	1–2		2–2			3–1	3–0
Esportivo			0–1			0–2		1–3	0–0	1–2		0–3
Grêmio	3–0	2–0	1–0				2–1		6–1			
Internacional				2–2	4–1			2–2		2–0	4–0	3–0
Juventude	2–1	1–0	1–0			2–3					1–1	
Novo Hamburgo		0–0	2–0	1–1			0–0	0–0		1–2		
São José		2–2	0–0	1–1		0–1		1–1			1–0	
São Luiz	2–1				0–0	0–0			1–0			1–1
Ypiranga			2–2			0–0		3–2	3–1	3–1		

Updated to match(es) played on unknown. Source: Soccerway
Legend: Blue = home team win; Yellow = draw; Red = away team win.
For upcoming matches, an "a" indicates there is an article about the rivalry between the two participants.

=== Positions by matchday ===
The table lists the positions of teams after each matchday.

Team ╲ Round	1	2	3	4	5	6	7	8	9	10	11
Grêmio	1	1	1	1	1	1	1	1	1	1	1
Internacional	4	6	3	2	2	3	3	2	2	2	2
Caxias	10	9	6	6	3	4	4	4	4	4	3
Ypiranga	7	2	5	9	7	2	2	3	3	3	4
Juventude	5	5	8	5	8	8	8	5	6	5	5
São José	2	3	7	3	4	6	5	7	5	7	6
Brasil de Pelotas	3	4	2	4	6	7	7	6	7	6	7
Novo Hamburgo	9	12	9	10	10	9	9	9	9	8	8
Avenida	8	8	4	7	5	5	6	8	8	9	9
São Luiz	6	7	10	8	9	10	10	10	10	10	10
Esportivo	11	10	12	12	11	12	12	11	11	11	11
Aimoré	12	11	11	11	12	11	11	12	12	12	12

Qualification to Knockout stage
Relegation to Série A2

Source: Soccerway

== Knockout stage ==
=== Semi-finals ===
The first legs was played on 18–19 March, and the second legs was played on 25–26 March 2023.

Team 1	Agg.	Team 2	1st leg	2nd leg
Grêmio	3–3 (5–4 p)	Ypiranga	1–2	2–1
Internacional	2–2 (4–5 p)	Caxias	1–1	1–1

==== Match C1 ====
19 March 2023
16:00

Ypiranga	2–1	Grêmio
Erick 69' (pen.), 90+6' (pen.)	Report	Suárez 12'

Colosso da Lagoa, Erechim
Referee: Rafael Rodrigo Klein

25 March 2023
16:30

Grêmio	2–1	Ypiranga
Thaciano 61'; Bruno Alves 78'	Report	Vitor Hugo 53'
Penalties
Reinaldo (penalty missed); Cristaldo (penalty scored); Bitello (penalty scored); Suárez (penalty scored); Diego Souza (penalty missed); Bruno Alves (penalty scored); Gustavinho (penalty scored)	5–4	Gedeilson (penalty missed); Vitor Hugo (penalty scored); Erick (penalty scored); Ralph (penalty missed); Caíque (penalty scored); Ronald Carvalho (penalty scored); Jhonatan Ribeiro (penalty missed)

Arena do Grêmio, Porto Alegre
Attendance: 39,869
Referee: Douglas Scwengber da Silva

Grêmio advances to the finals.

==== Match C2 ====
18 March 2023
16:30

Caxias	1–1	Internacional
Mercado 16' (o.g.)	Report	Alan Patrick 5'

Centenário, Caxias do Sul
Attendance: 8,429
Referee: Jean Pierre Gonçalves Lima

26 March 2023
18:00

Internacional	1–1	Caxias
Maurício 20'	Report	Eronildo 45+3'
Penalties
Alan Patrick (penalty scored); Pedro Henrique (penalty scored); Alemão (penalty scored); Matheus Dias (penalty scored); Estêvão (penalty missed)	4–5	Marcão (penalty scored); Jean Dias (penalty scored); Vinícius Guedes (penalty scored); Marcelo (penalty scored); Wesley (penalty scored)

Beira-Rio, Porto Alegre
Attendance: 37,182
Referee: Rafael Rodrigo Klein

Caxias advances to the finals.

=== Finals ===
The first legs was played on 1 April, and the second legs was played on 8 April 2023.

Team 1	Agg.	Team 2	1st leg	2nd leg
Grêmio	2–1	Caxias	1–1	1–0

==== Match G1 ====
===== First leg =====
1 April 2023
16:30

Caxias	1–1	Grêmio
Marlon 8'	Report	Vina 45+3'

Centenário, Caxias do Sul
Attendance: 15,879
Referee: Anderson Daronco

===== Second leg =====
8 April 2023
16:30

Grêmio	1–0	Caxias
Suárez 65' (pen.)	Report

Arena do Grêmio, Porto Alegre
Attendance: 51,556
Referee: Leandro Vuaden

== Overall table ==
Pos	Team	Pld	W	D	L	GF	GA	GD	Pts	Qualification or relegation
1	Grêmio (C)	15	11	3	1	27	9	+18	36	Champions
2	Caxias	15	5	8	2	22	15	+7	23	Runners-up
3	Internacional	13	6	6	1	24	10	+14	24	
4	Ypiranga	13	6	3	4	20	18	+2	21	
5	Juventude	11	4	5	2	17	14	+3	17	
6	São José	11	4	4	3	11	12	−1	16	
7	Brasil de Pelotas	11	3	4	4	6	8	−2	13	
8	Novo Hamburgo	11	2	5	4	7	13	−6	11	
9	Avenida	11	2	4	5	7	11	−4	10	
10	São Luiz	11	2	4	5	6	13	−7	10	
11	Esportivo (R)	11	1	3	7	6	19	−13	6	Relegation to Série A2
12	Aimoré (R)	11	1	1	9	5	16	−11	4	Relegation to Série A2

Source: Soccerway
Rules for classification: 1) Points; 2) Wins; 3) Goal difference; 4) Goals scored; 5) fewest red cards; 6) fewest yellow cards; 7) Draw in the headquarters of the FGF.
(C) Champions; (R) Relegated

== Statistics ==
=== Top scorers ===
Rank	Player	Club	Goal
1	(Brazil) Pedro Henrique	Internacional	8
2	(Uruguay) Luis Suárez	Grêmio	7
3	(Brazil) Rodrigo Rodrigues	Juventude	6
4	(Brazil) Bruno Baio	Ypiranga	5
4	(Brazil) Carlos Henrique	Avenida	5
6	(Brazil) Alan Patrick	Internacional	3
6	(Brazil) Mateus Pivô	São José	3
