= 2022 Campeonato Gaúcho =

Campeonato Gaúcho
- Season: 2022
- Dates: 26 January – 2 April 2022
- Teams: 12
- Champions: Grêmio
- Relegated: União Frederiquense; Guarany de Bagé
- Matches: 72
- Goals: 149 (2.07 per match)
- Top goalscorer: Elias Manoel; Erick Farias (5 goals)

The 2022 Campeonato da Primeira Divisão de Futebol Profissional da FGF - Divisão Especial - Série A1, better known as the 2022 Campeonato Gaúcho (officially the Gauchão Ipiranga 2022 for sponsorship reasons), was the 102nd season of Rio Grande do Sul's top flight football league. The competition was played from 26 January to 2 April 2022. 12 clubs contested in the Campeonato Gaúcho. Grêmio were the four-time defending champion.

== Teams ==
A total of 12 teams competed in the 2022 Série A1 season.

Club	City	Manager	Stadium	Capacity	Pos. in 2021	1st season	Titles	Last title	First title
Aimoré	São Leopoldo	Rafael Lacerda	Cristo Rei	12,000	7th	1919	1	1919	1919
Brasil de Pelotas	Pelotas	Jerson Testoni	Bento Freitas	18,000	9th	1919	1	1919	1919
Caxias	Caxias do Sul	Rogério Zimmermann	Centenário	22,132	4th	1961	1	2000	2000
Grêmio	Porto Alegre	Roger Machado	Arena do Grêmio	55,225	1st	1919	40	2021	1921
Guarany de Bagé	Bagé	Cristian de Souza	Estrela D'Alva	10,000	2nd (2nd division)	1919	2	1938	1920
Internacional	Porto Alegre	Alexander Medina	Beira-Rio	50,128	2nd	1927	45	2016	1927
Juventude	Caxias do Sul	Eduardo Baptista	Alfredo Jaconi	23,726	3rh	1925	1	1998	1998
Novo Hamburgo	Novo Hamburgo	Gelson Conte	Estádio do Vale	6,500	10th	1930	1	2017	2017
São José-RS	Porto Alegre	Paulo Baier	Passo D'Areia	8,000	6th	1961	—	—	—
São Luiz	Ijuí	Paulo Marques	19 de Outubro	14,000	8th	1974	—	—	—
União Frederiquense	Frederico Westphalen	Daniel Franco	Vermelhão da Colina	4,000	1st (2nd division)	2015	—	—	—
Ypiranga-RS	Erechim	Luizinho Vieira	Colosso da Lagoa	30,000	5th	1968	—	—	—

== First stage ==
=== Table ===
Pos	Team	Pld	W	D	L	GF	GA	GD	Pts	Qualification or relegation
1	Ypiranga-RS	11	6	3	2	17	8	+9	21	Qualification to Knockout stage
2	Grêmio	11	6	3	2	18	10	+8	21	Qualification to Knockout stage
3	Internacional	11	5	4	2	13	10	+3	19	Qualification to Knockout stage
4	Brasil (PE)	11	3	7	1	12	11	+1	16	Qualification to Knockout stage
5	Caxias	11	4	3	4	15	9	+6	15	
6	São José-RS	11	4	3	4	10	10	0	15	
7	Novo Hamburgo	11	3	6	2	11	10	+1	15	
8	Aimoré	11	4	2	5	9	11	−2	14	
9	São Luiz	11	3	4	4	7	13	−6	13	
10	Juventude	11	2	5	4	9	9	0	11	
11	União Frederiquense	11	2	3	6	8	16	−8	9	Relegation to Série A2
12	Guarany de Bagé	11	1	3	7	7	19	−12	6	Relegation to Série A2

Updated to match(es) played on unknown. Source: Soccerway
Rules for classification: 1) Points; 2) Wins; 3) Goal difference; 4) Goals scored; 5) fewest red cards; 6) fewest yellow cards; 7) Draw in the headquarters of the FGF.

=== Results ===
Home \ Away	AIM	BRA	CAX	GRE	GUA	INT	JUV	NHA	SJO	SLU	UNI	YPI
Aimoré	—	0–0	0–2	1–2	—	—	1–1	—	—	1–0	2–0	—
Brasil (PE)	—	—	—	1–1	4–1	—	1–0	1–1	1–0	—	—	1–1
Caxias	—	4–0	—	—	—	0–1	—	3–1	1–1	—	3–0	—
Grêmio	—	—	2–1	—	2–0	—	1–1	—	2–1	4–0	—	2–0
Guarany de Bagé	0–1	—	1–1	—	—	1–1	—	—	—	2–2	1–0	—
Internacional	1–0	1–1	—	1–0	—	—	—	1–1	—	—	2–0	—
Juventude	—	—	0–0	—	2–0	1–2	—	1–1	2–0	—	—	0–0
Novo Hamburgo	2–1	—	—	1–1	2–0	—	—	—	—	0–0	—	1–0
São José-RS	0–2	—	—	—	1–0	3–2	—	1–0	—	—	—	0–0
São Luiz	—	1–1	1–0	—	—	0–0	1–0	—	0–3	—	1–0	—
União Frederiquense	—	1–1	—	3–1	—	—	2–1	1–1	0–0	—	—	—
Ypiranga-RS	3–0	—	2–0	—	3–1	3–1	—	—	—	2–1	3–1	—

Updated to match(es) played on unknown. Source: Soccerway
Legend: Blue = home team win; Yellow = draw; Red = away team win.
For upcoming matches, an "a" indicates there is an article about the rivalry between the two participants.

=== Positions by matchday ===
The table lists the positions of teams after each matchday.

Team ╲ Round	1	2	3	4	5	6	7	8	9	10	11
Ypiranga-RS	2	6	3	2	2	2	1	2	1	1	1
Grêmio	1	2	2	1	1	1	2	1	2	2	2
Internacional	3	1	1	4	4	3	3	3	5	3	3
Brasil (PE)	8	8	4	8	6	6	7	8	7	6	4
Caxias	10	9	6	3	3	7	8	5	4	7	5
São José-RS	4	4	7	9	9	9	11	9	8	8	6
Novo Hamburgo	6	3	5	6	8	8	5	7	3	4	7
Aimoré	7	5	9	5	7	4	6	6	9	9	8
São Luiz	9	7	8	7	5	5	4	4	6	5	9
Juventude	11	11	10	11	11	11	10	11	11	10	10
União Frederiquense	5	10	11	10	10	10	9	10	10	11	11
Guarany de Bagé	12	12	12	12	12	12	12	12	12	12	12

Qualification to Knockout stage
Relegation to Série A2

Source: Soccerway

== Knockout stage ==
=== Semi-finals ===
The first legs were played on 19–20 March, and the second legs were played on 23 March 2022.

Team 1	Agg.	Team 2	1st leg	2nd leg
Ypiranga-RS	3–2	Brasil (PE)	0–1	3–1
Grêmio	3–1	Internacional	3–0	0–1

==== Match C1 ====
20 March 2022
20:30

Brasil (PE)	1–0	Ypiranga-RS
Marllon 20' (pen.)	Report

Bento Freitas, Pelotas
Referee: Anderson Daronco

23 March 2022
19:30

Ypiranga-RS	3–1	Brasil (PE)
Erick 27', 70'; Hugo Almeida 33'	Report	Luizinho 28'

Colosso da Lagoa, Erechim
Referee: Douglas Schwengber da Silva

Ypiranga advances to the finals.

==== Match C2 ====
19 March 2022
16:30

Internacional	0–3	Grêmio
	Report	Elias Manoel 11'; Bitello 23'; Diego Souza 72' (pen.)

Beira-Rio, Porto Alegre
Referee: Jean Pierre Gonçalves Lima

23 March 2022
22:15

Grêmio	0–1	Internacional
	Report	Taison 64'

Arena do Grêmio, Porto Alegre
Referee: Leandro Vuaden

Grêmio advances to the finals.

=== Finals ===
The first legs will be played on 26 March, and the second legs will be played on 2 April 2022.

Team 1	Agg.	Team 2	1st leg	2nd leg
Grêmio	3–1	Ypiranga-RS	1–0	2–1

==== Match G1 ====
===== First leg =====
26 March 2022
16:30

Ypiranga-RS	0–1	Grêmio
	Report	Lucas Silva 90+3' (pen.)

Colosso da Lagoa, Erechim
Attendance: 11,594
Referee: Anderson Daronco

Ypiranga-RS	Grêmio

===== Second leg =====
2 April 2022
16:30

Grêmio	2–1	Ypiranga-RS
B. Alves 45+1'; Rodrigues 76'	Report	Erick 79'

Arena do Grêmio, Porto Alegre
Referee: Leandro Vuaden

Grêmio	Ypiranga-RS

== Overall table ==
Pos	Team	Pld	W	D	L	GF	GA	GD	Pts	Qualification or relegation
1	Grêmio	15	9	3	3	24	12	+12	30	Champions
2	Ypiranga-RS	15	7	3	5	21	13	+8	24	Runners-up
3	Internacional	13	6	4	3	14	13	+1	22	
4	Brasil (PE)	13	4	7	2	14	14	0	19	
5	Caxias	11	4	3	4	15	9	+6	15	
6	São José-RS	11	4	3	4	10	10	0	15	
7	Novo Hamburgo	11	3	6	2	11	10	+1	15	
8	Aimoré	11	4	2	5	9	11	−2	14	
9	São Luiz	11	3	4	4	7	13	−6	13	
10	Juventude	11	2	5	4	9	9	0	11	
11	União Frederiquense	11	2	3	6	8	16	−8	9	Relegation to Série A2
12	Guarany de Bagé	11	1	3	7	7	19	−12	6	Relegation to Série A2

Source: Soccerway
Rules for classification: 1) Points; 2) Wins; 3) Goal difference; 4) Goals scored; 5) fewest red cards; 6) fewest yellow cards; 7) Draw in the headquarters of the FGF.

== Statistics ==
=== Top scorers ===
Rank	Player	Club	Goal
1	(Brazil) Elias Manoel	Grêmio	5
1	(Brazil) Erick Farias	Ypiranga-RS	5
