= Recopa Gaúcha =

Football tournament in Rio Grande do Sul, Brazil

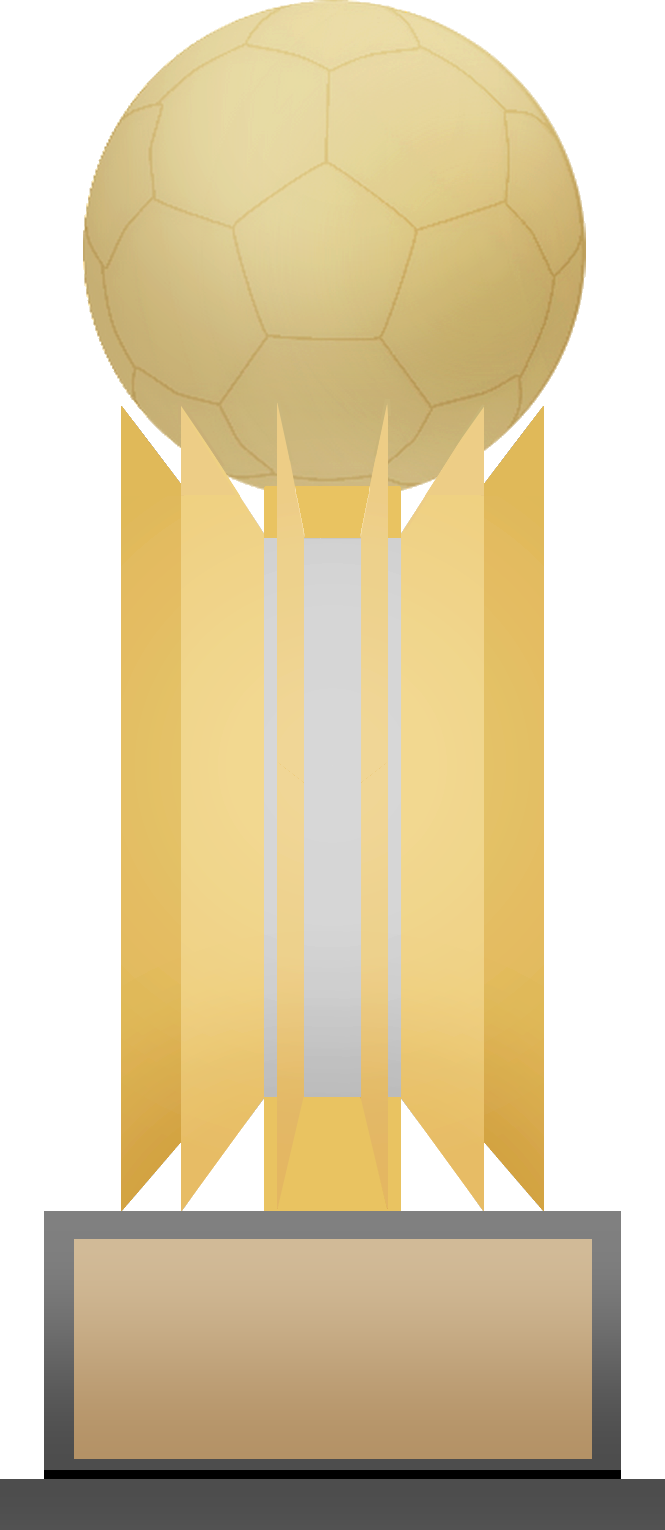
- Organiser(s): FGF
- Founded: 2014
- Region: Rio Grande do Sul, Brazil
- Teams: 2
- Related competitions: Campeonato Gaúcho; Copa FGF
- Current champions: Internacional (3rd title)
- Most championships: Grêmio (5 titles)
- Broadcaster: SporTV

The Recopa Gaúcha (English: Rio Grande do Sul Winners Cup), is a super cup tournament organized by the Rio Grande do Sul Football Federation (FGF), disputed between the winners of Campeonato Gaúcho and Copa FGF of each season, since 2014.

== List of champions ==
Following is the list with all the champions of the Recopa Gaúcha.

Year	Venue (date)	Champion	Final score	Runners-up
2014	Estádio Boca do Lobo, Pelotas (13 Jan)	Pelotas; 2013 Super Copa Gaúcha winners	3–2	Internacional; 2013 Campeonato Gaúcho winners
2015	Estádio Alviazul, Lajeado (1 Feb)	Lajeadense; 2014 Super Copa Gaúcha winners	1–1; 3–1 (pen.)	Internacional; 2014 Campeonato Gaúcho winners
2016	Estádio Passo D'Areia, Porto Alegre (3 Feb)	Internacional; 2015 Campeonato Gaúcho winners	0–0; 3–2 (pen.)	São José; 2015 Super Copa Gaúcha winners
2017	Estádio Colosso da Lagoa, Erechim (22 Mar)	Internacional; 2016 Campeonato Gaúcho winners	1–1; 4–3 (pen.); Report	Ypiranga; 2016 Super Copa Gaúcha runners-up
2018	Estádio Passo D'Areia, Porto Alegre (24 Jan)	São José; 2017 Copa FGF winners	2–1	Novo Hamburgo; 2017 Campeonato Gaúcho winners
2018	Estádio do Vale, Novo Hamburgo (14 Mar)	São José; 2017 Copa FGF winners	1–0	Novo Hamburgo; 2017 Campeonato Gaúcho winners
2019	Arena do Grêmio, Porto Alegre (10 Feb)	Grêmio; 2018 Campeonato Gaúcho winners	6–0; Report	Avenida; 2018 Copa FGF winners
2020	Estádio Boca do Lobo, Pelotas (19 Jan)	Pelotas; 2019 Copa FGF winners	1–1; 5–4 (pen.); Report	Grêmio; 2019 Campeonato Gaúcho winners
2021	Arena do Grêmio, Porto Alegre (6 Jun)	Grêmio; 2020 Campeonato Gaúcho winners	3–0; Report	Santa Cruz; 2020 Copa FGF winners
2022	Estádio Altos da Glória, Vacaria (24 May)	Grêmio; 2021 Campeonato Gaúcho winners	5–0; Report	Glória; 2021 Copa FGF winners
2023	Arena do Grêmio, Porto Alegre (18 Jan)	Grêmio; 2022 Campeonato Gaúcho winners	4–1; Report	São Luiz; 2022 Copa FGF winners
2024	Estádio 19 de Outubro, Ijuí (28 Feb)	São Luiz; 2023 Copa FGF winners	2–0; Report	Grêmio; 2023 Campeonato Gaúcho winners
2025	Arena do Grêmio, Porto Alegre (8 Jul)	Grêmio; 2024 Campeonato Gaúcho winners	2–0; Report	São José; 2024 Copa FGF winners
2026	Estádio Bento Freitas, Pelotas (6 May)	Internacional; 2025 Campeonato Gaúcho winners	2–1; Report	Brasil de Pelotas; 2025 Copa FGF winners

1. Internacional has won the 2016 Super Copa Gaúcha with their B team

=== Titles by team ===
Rank	Club	Winners	Winning years
1	Grêmio	5	2019, 2021, 2022, 2023, 2025
2	Internacional	3	2016, 2017, 2026
3	Pelotas	2	2014, 2020
4	Lajeadense	1	2015
4	São José	1	2018
4	São Luiz	1	2024
