= 2022 Recopa Gaúcha =

- Event: Recopa Gaúcha
| Grêmio | Glória |
| Campeonato Gaúcho | Copa FGF |
| 5 | 0 |
- Date: 24 May 2022
- Venue: Estádio Altos da Glória, Vacaria
- Referee: Roger Goulart

The 2022 Recopa Gaúcha was 9th season of an annual football match contested by the winners of the Campeonato Gaúcho and the Copa FGF in the previous season. The competition is considered a Super Cup of football in Rio Grande do Sul, being organized by FGF.

The current holders are Grêmio, and they will be able to defend his title by winning the 2021 Campeonato Gaúcho. The opponent will be Glória, who was champion of the 2021 Copa FGF.

== Teams ==
| Club | City | Stadium | Capacity | Qualification | Titles | First title | Last title | First appearance | Total appearances | Last appearance |
|---|---|---|---|---|---|---|---|---|---|---|
| Grêmio | Porto Alegre | Arena do Grêmio | 55,225 | 2021 Campeonato Gaúcho champions | 2 | 2019 | 2021 | 2019 | 3 | 2021 |
| Glória | Vacaria | Estádio Altos da Glória | 8,000 | 2021 Copa FGF champions | – | – | – | – | – | – |
