= 2023 Recopa Gaúcha =

- Event: Recopa Gaúcha
| Grêmio | São Luiz |
| Campeonato Gaúcho | Copa FGF |
| 4 | 1 |
- Date: 18 January 2023
- Venue: Arena do Grêmio, Porto Alegre
- Referee: Leandro Pedro Vuaden

The 2023 Recopa Gaúcha was 10th edition of an annual football match contested by the winners of the Campeonato Gaúcho and the Copa FGF in the previous season. The competition is considered a Super Cup of football in Rio Grande do Sul, being organized by FGF.

The current holders are Grêmio, and they will be able to defend his title by winning the 2022 Campeonato Gaúcho. Their opponent is São Luiz from the city of Ijuí, winners of the 2022 edition of the Copa FGF.

The event received worldwide attention due the debut of Luis Suárez on Grêmio. The match had an attendance of 49,614.

== Teams ==
| Club | City | Stadium | Capacity | Qualification | Titles | First title | Last title | First appearance | Total appearances | Last appearance |
|---|---|---|---|---|---|---|---|---|---|---|
| Grêmio | Porto Alegre | Arena do Grêmio | 55,225 | 2022 Campeonato Gaúcho champions | 3 | 2019 | 2022 | 2019 | 4 | 2022 |
| São Luiz | Ijuí | Estádio 19 de Outubro | 8,000 | 2022 Copa FGF champions | – | – | – | – | – | – |
