= History of Grêmio FBPA =

History of Brazilian association football club Grêmio Foot-Ball Porto Alegrense

The history of Grêmio Foot-Ball Porto Alegrense (commonly known as Grêmio and abbreviated as FBPA), a Brazilian football club based in Porto Alegre, Rio Grande do Sul, began with its founding on September 15, 1903, by Candido Dias da Silva. It is regarded as one of the most prominent clubs in Brazil and South America. The club's colors are blue, black, and white. Grêmio is affectionately nicknamed Immortal Tricolor, Tricolor dos Pampas, Tricolor Gaúcho, King of Cups, and Club of All, reflecting its storied success, particularly in knockout competitions.

== 1903–1936: Foundation and amateur era ==
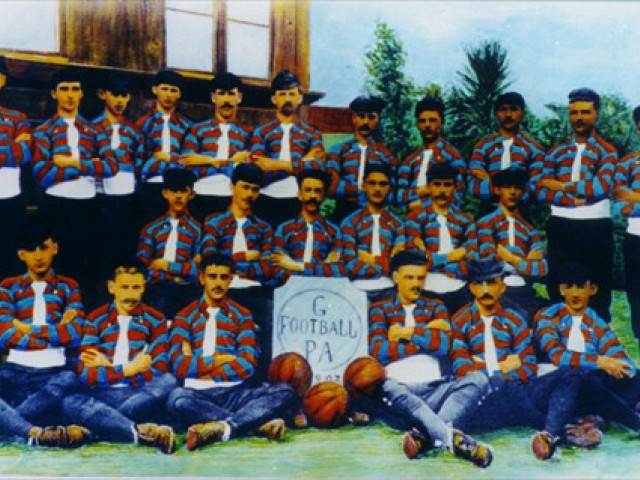
Photograph of the first Grêmio team, December 1903

On the holiday of September 7, 1903, the Sport Club Rio Grande held an exhibition match in Porto Alegre, drawing a large crowd to an improvised field until the ball deflated. After the ball was rendered unusable, Candido Dias da Silva, a merchant from Sorocaba, São Paulo, lent his own ball. In gratitude, he received guidance on founding a football club. Eight days later, thirty-two men gathered at the Salão Grau, a restaurant in a hotel on Rua 15 de Novembro (now Rua José Montauri) in Porto Alegre's historic district, and established the Grêmio Foot-Ball Porto Alegrense.

The club's first official headquarters was designated at Rua Santa Catarina, number 47 (now Rua Dr. Flores, in downtown Porto Alegre). Carlos Luiz Bohrer was appointed president. On September 30, the club's colors were chosen: jerseys would feature horizontal tan and blue stripes with a white waistband, paired with black shorts and socks. At the time, additional accessories, now obsolete, such as white ties and caps, were also specified.

The newly founded club's first match took place on March 6, 1904, against the FussBall Club Porto Alegre, established on the same day as Grêmio. In a doubleheader (two matches in one afternoon), Grêmio secured its first two victories, both by a score of 1–0. On July 20, 1904, the uniform was updated to a design split evenly between blue and black.

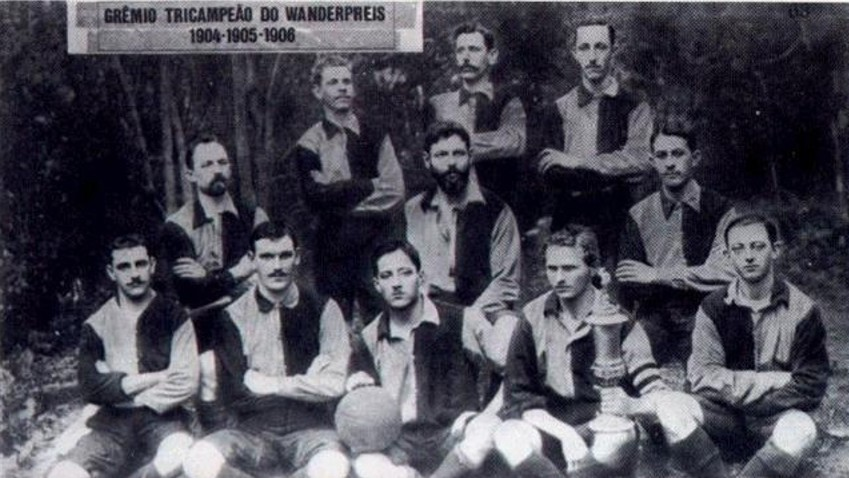
Photograph of Grêmio players in 1904, wearing black and blue uniforms

Without a stadium, early training sessions were held in various locations, including the Gravataí floodplain (now the site of the Salgado Filho International Airport), the Redenção floodplain near the Glória Grotto, Morro da Polícia, and the Floresta neighborhood.

In 1904, the club's leadership decided to build its own stadium. The chosen site was in the Moinhos de Vento neighborhood, near the Prado da Independência and the German Shooting Club (now the location of the Caixeiros Viajantes Club). The land belonged to Hemetério Mostardeiro, inherited from his father, Antônio José Gonçalves Mostardeiro, whose family owned much of the area, informally known as Mato Mostardeiro.

Traditionally, this was a locale frequented by Porto Alegre's affluent families. With a loan from the Brasilianische Bank Für Deutschland, the club purchased the property from the Mostardeiro family for ten contos de réis. The inaugural match at the stadium, held in August 1904, featured two Grêmio lineups competing against each other. In April 1911, after selling membership bonds for fifty thousand réis, Grêmio acquired an additional plot from the Mostardeiros, expanding the "Fortim da Baixada." The new pavilion, nicknamed Pombal, was completed in October 1912. In 1918, this pavilion was renovated, becoming the club's first owned headquarters.

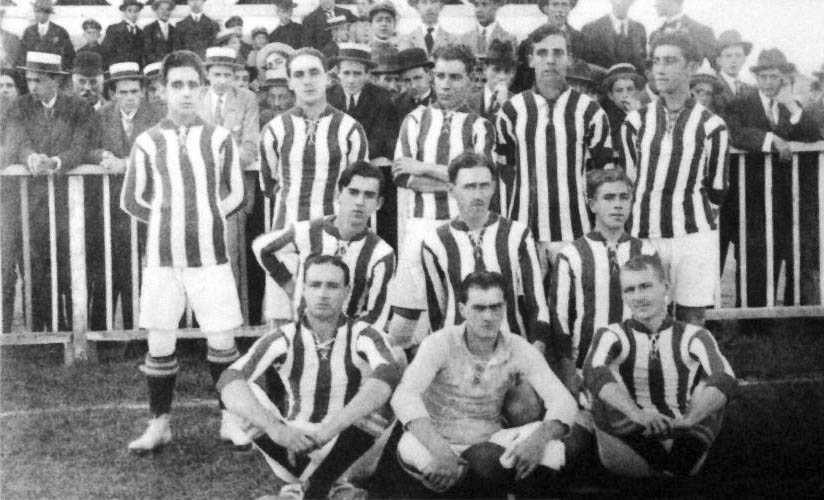
1917 team: (top) Carneiro, Berdehegaray, Rodríguez, Jorge Py, Scalco. (middle): Dorival, Hanssen, Chiquinho. (bottom): Garibotti, Kunz, Mohrdieck.

The first competition Grêmio participated in was the Wanderpreis Cup, with its inaugural edition on March 6, 1904, which Grêmio won against the Fussball Club Porto Alegre.

Thus, a tradition began to take shape. A few years later, on July 18, 1909, Grêmio played its first match against Sport Club Internacional, which would later become its archrival, securing a 10–0 victory. The following year, Grêmio proposed the creation of the 1st Porto Alegre Clubs League. Subsequently, the Porto Alegre City Championship was established, which the Tricolor dominated from 1911 to 1915. Even as an amateur club, Grêmio competed against teams from other states and even countries. According to records from the Hermínio Bittencourt Memorial, in 1913, the first black player, Antunes, played for the team.

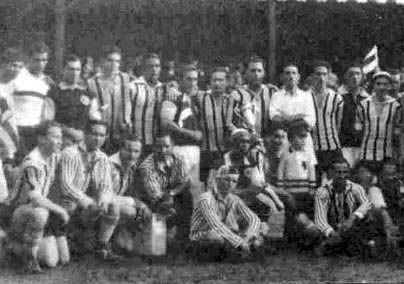
Grêmio, champions of the 1931 Campeonato Gaúcho, defeating Guarani de Alegrete. This was the club's fourth state title.

In the following decade, Grêmio's dominance persisted, with five consecutive metropolitan titles (1919–1923) and three Campeonato Gaúcho titles (1921, 1922, and 1926), a competition established in 1920. The 1930s further fueled Grêmio's growth, with achievements including four consecutive Porto Alegre championship titles (1930–1933) and two consecutive state titles (1931–1932).

The pinnacle of this era was 1935, marked by the Grenal Farroupilha, a name given to the entire city championship held to commemorate the centenary of the Farroupilha Revolution. By defeating its traditional rival, the Tricolor claimed the title. This match was the last for Eurico Lara, who began playing for the club in 1920 and became a club legend. Thus, this period not only brought titles but also laid the foundation for Grêmio's tradition and respect.

== 1937–1953: Professionalism at the club ==
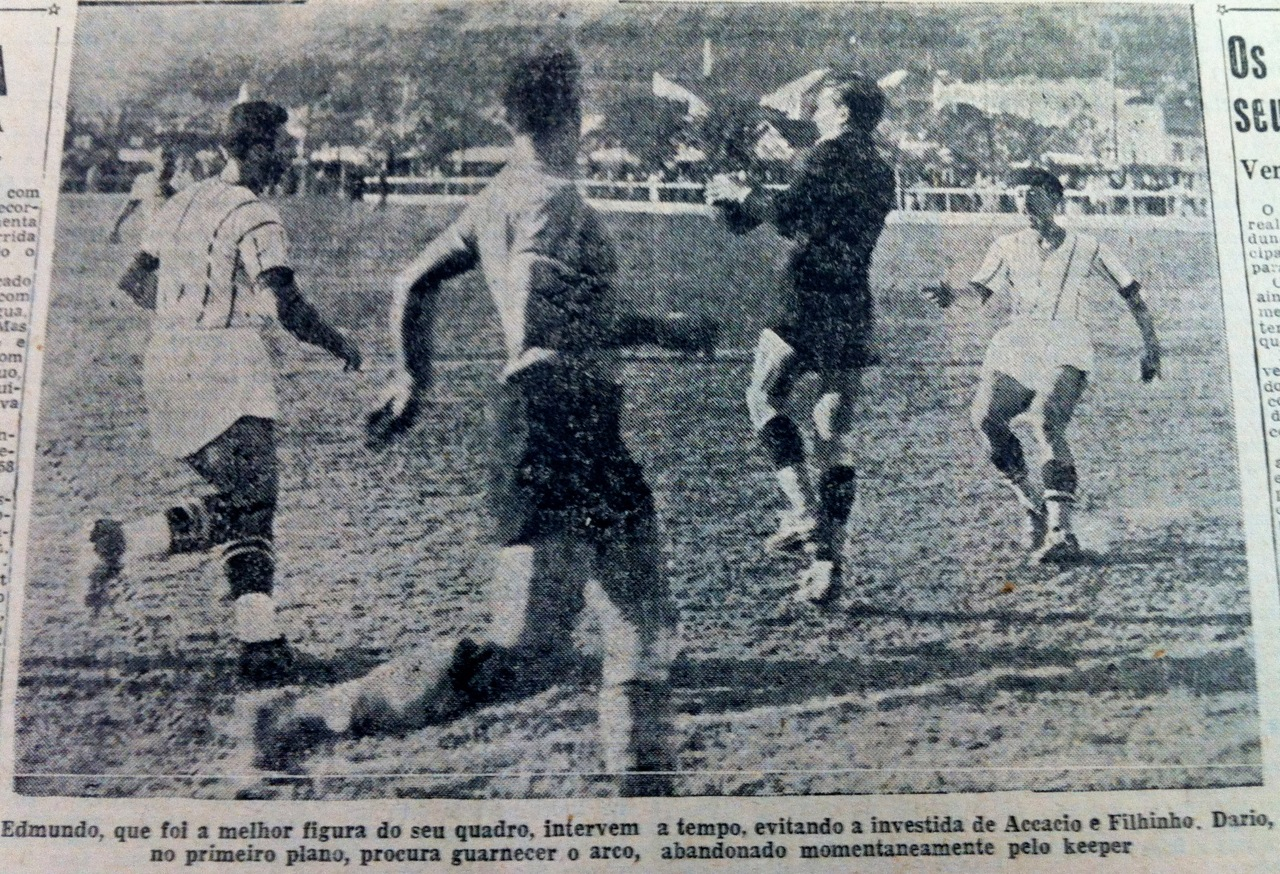
Match between Força e Luz and Grêmio in the 1940 Porto Alegre City Championship.

Following a wave of football professionalization across South America in the early 1930s, Rio Grande do Sul also transitioned to this new model of football management. In 1937, the state established the Especializada, a professional department affiliated with the Brazilian Football Confederation. This body organized a metropolitan championship distinct from the previous city championship, which was managed by the Rio Grande do Sul Sports Federation (now the Federação Gaúcha de Futebol), affiliated with the Brazilian Sports Confederation. Until 1939, despite winning all three metropolitan championships, Grêmio did not qualify for the Campeonato Gaúcho due to this jurisdictional conflict, which was resolved in the 1940s. With the creation of the National Sports Council, professionalism was officially adopted by the Tricolor.

In late 1949, Grêmio became the first Rio Grande do Sul team to tour abroad, traveling to Central America. The following year, anticipating the need for a new stadium as the Baixada became inadequate, the club held a contest to select a stadium proposal. On January 8, 1951, the design by Plínio Oliveira Almeida, Naum Turquenitch, and Edison Ribeiro was chosen.

In 1952, Grêmio signed Tesourinha from Vasco. However, as early as the 1910s, the club had black players: Antunes (1912), Adão Lima (1925–1935), Hélio and Mário Carioca (both in the 1940s), and Hermes da Conceição (1947–1950) had previously played for the Tricolor.

In 1953 and 1954, Grêmio embarked on its second international tour, this time to Mexico, Ecuador, and Colombia. The tour began in April 1953 and concluded in 1954. Telêmaco Frazão de Lima was the coach.

== 1954–1980: Inauguration of the Olímpico and eleven Gaúcho titles ==
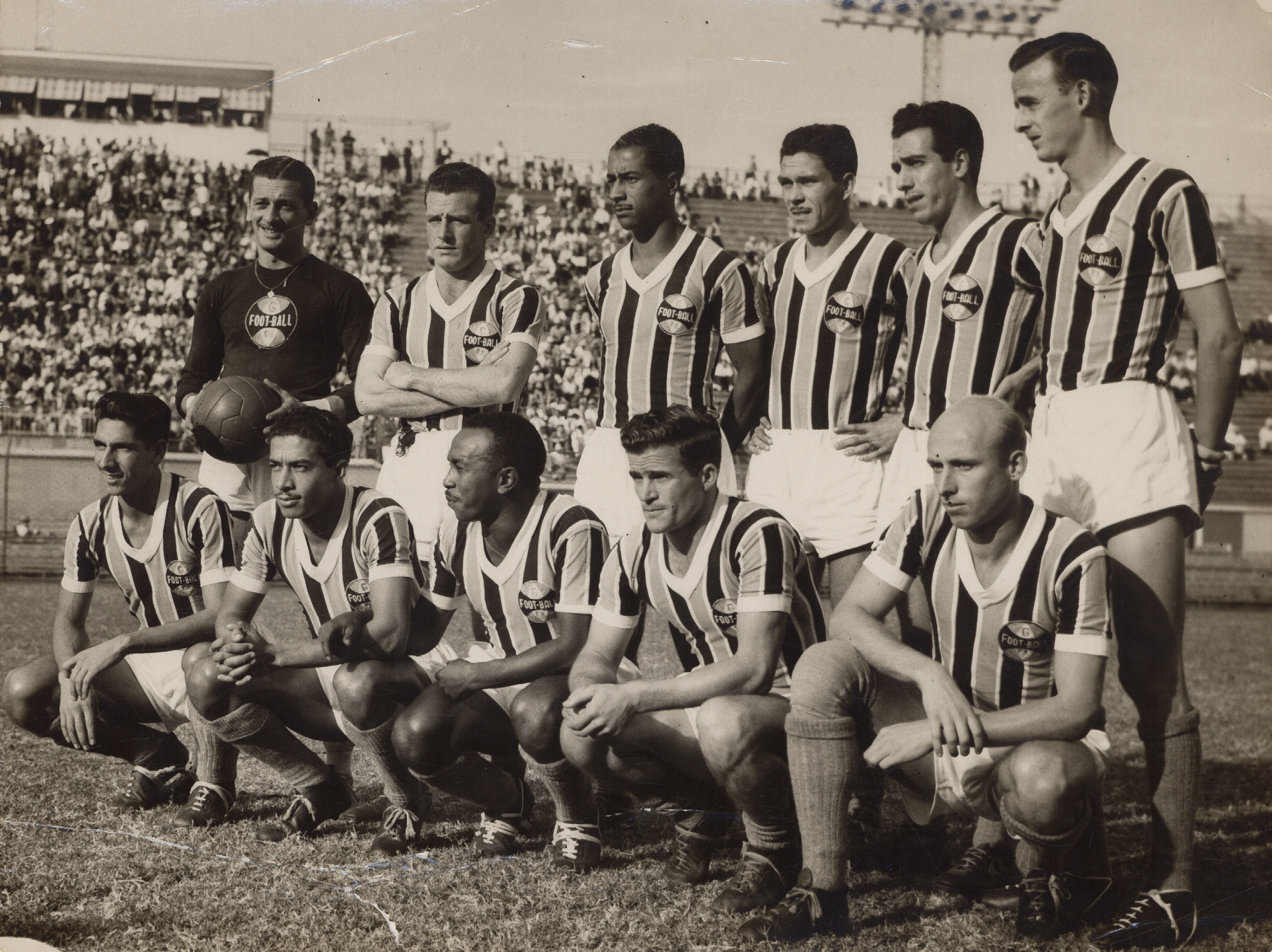
Grêmio team of 1950. Led by striker Detefon, the team had won the 1949 Campeonato Gaúcho the previous year. Later that year, this team defeated Flamengo 3–1, marking the first victory by a non-Rio de Janeiro team at the Maracanã.

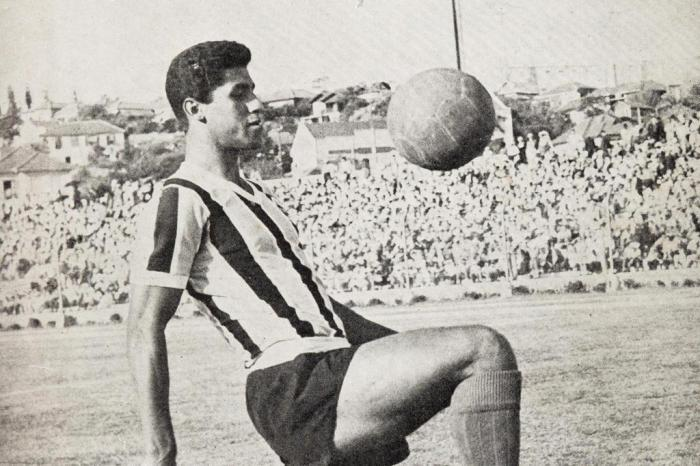
Airton Ferreira da Silva, known as "Airton Pavilhão," a legendary defender of the club. He won the Campeonato Gaúcho eleven times (1956, 1957, 1958, 1959, 1960, 1962, 1963, 1964, 1965, 1966, and 1967). He was also called up to the Brazil national football team between 1960 and 1964.

On September 19, 1954, Grêmio inaugurated its most significant project since its founding: the Olímpico Stadium. With a capacity of 38,000, it featured a single tier. In the opening match, Grêmio defeated Nacional 2–0. The president at the time was Saturnino Vanzelotti.

In the following years, Grêmio competed in thirteen championships and won twelve. The club secured five Gaúcho and metropolitan championship titles in a row (1956–1960) and eleven Gaúcho titles (1962–1968), the longest streak of state titles in its history. In the 1956 Gaúcho, Grêmio defeated Pelotas; in subsequent years, it overcame Bagé, Guarany de Bagé, and Clube Esportivo Aimoré, respectively. The 1960 championship was decided in a four-team playoff (Grêmio, Pelotas, 14 de Julho, and Nacional).

The Tricolor also participated in the Taça Brasil, which featured state champions, in nearly all these years, reaching the semifinals three times (1959, 1963, and 1967). It also competed in the Torneio Roberto Gomes Pedrosa, peaking in 1967, when it reached the finals but finished fourth. This era also saw the club win the 1962 South Brazilian Championship undefeated. Following the example set by Cruzeiro of Porto Alegre, which toured Europe in 1953, Grêmio traveled to the Old Continent in 1961 and 1962.

In 1970, Grêmio had its first player called up to the Brazil national football team in a World Cup-winning year. Everaldo was selected for the squad and earned a star on the Tricolor flag. After the early 1970s saw dominance by its rival in the Campeonato Gaúcho, Grêmio turned the tide in 1977, reclaiming the state title after nine years. The Tricolor defeated Internacional 1–0 in the final, with a goal by André Catimba, securing the trophy. This victory marked a resurgence for Grêmio, leading to significant achievements in the 1980s.

== 1981–1982: A prelude to triumphs ==
The 1980s began promisingly for Grêmio. In 1980, the team won the Gauchão. In the Brazilian Championship, it achieved a sixth-place finish, though this was below its best performances in the previous decade (fifth in 1973 and 1974). On the infrastructure front, the Olímpico Stadium was expanded, becoming the "Olímpico Monumental" due to the grandeur of the construction. The president at the time was Hélio Dourado.

In 1981, despite not winning the state championship, Grêmio had its best year since its founding: it clinched the Brasileirão, which then featured forty-four teams. The final was a memorable match against São Paulo at the Estádio do Morumbi, where Grêmio won 1–0 with a goal by Baltazar. This victory marked the beginning of an era of ascent for Grêmio.

== 1983–1990: World title and unprecedented national titles ==
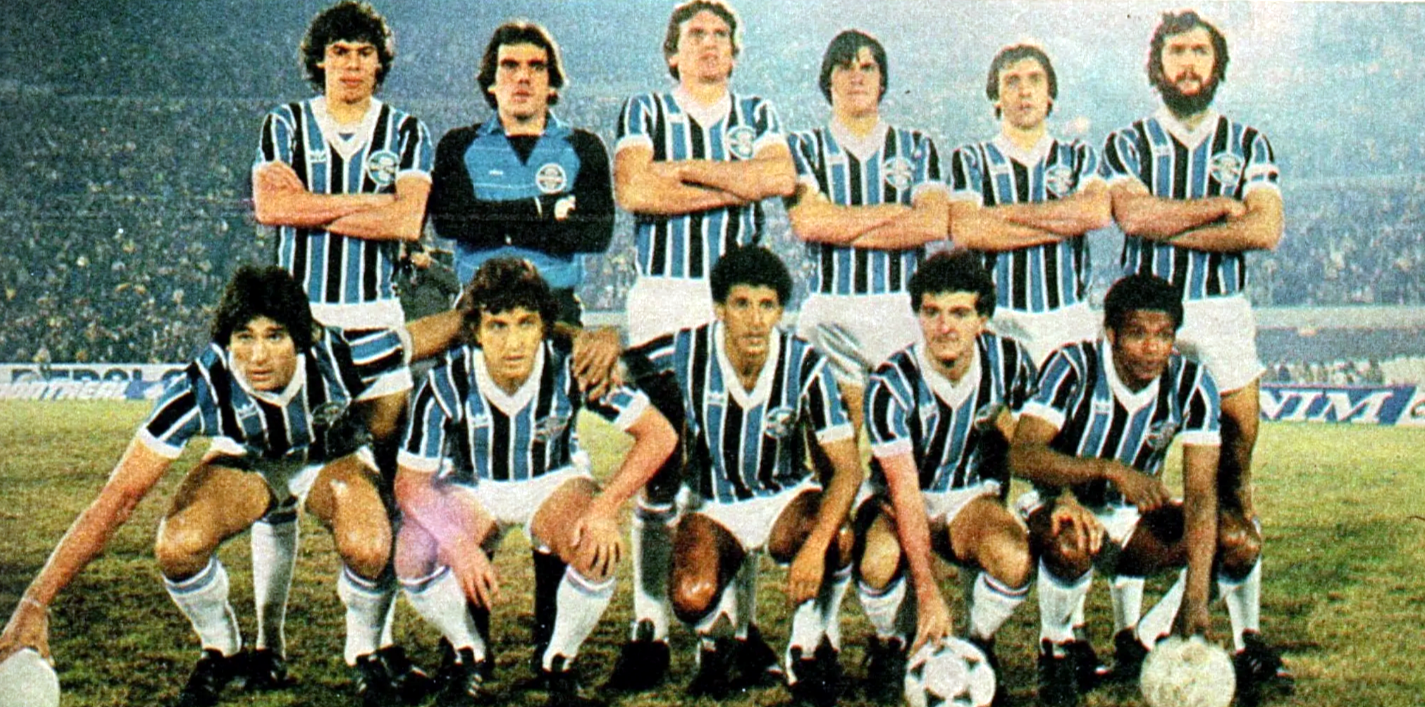
Final of the 1983 Copa Libertadores, first leg against Peñarol in Montevideo. Lineup: Mazarópi, Jorge Baidek, Hugo de León, Paulo Roberto, China, Casemiro, Renato Portaluppi, Osvaldo, Caio, Tita, Tarciso.

In 1982, Grêmio was the Brazilian Championship runner-up, losing to Flamengo in the final, which required a rematch. In its first participation in the Copa Libertadores, the team was eliminated in the first phase but gained valuable experience for the following year's competition.

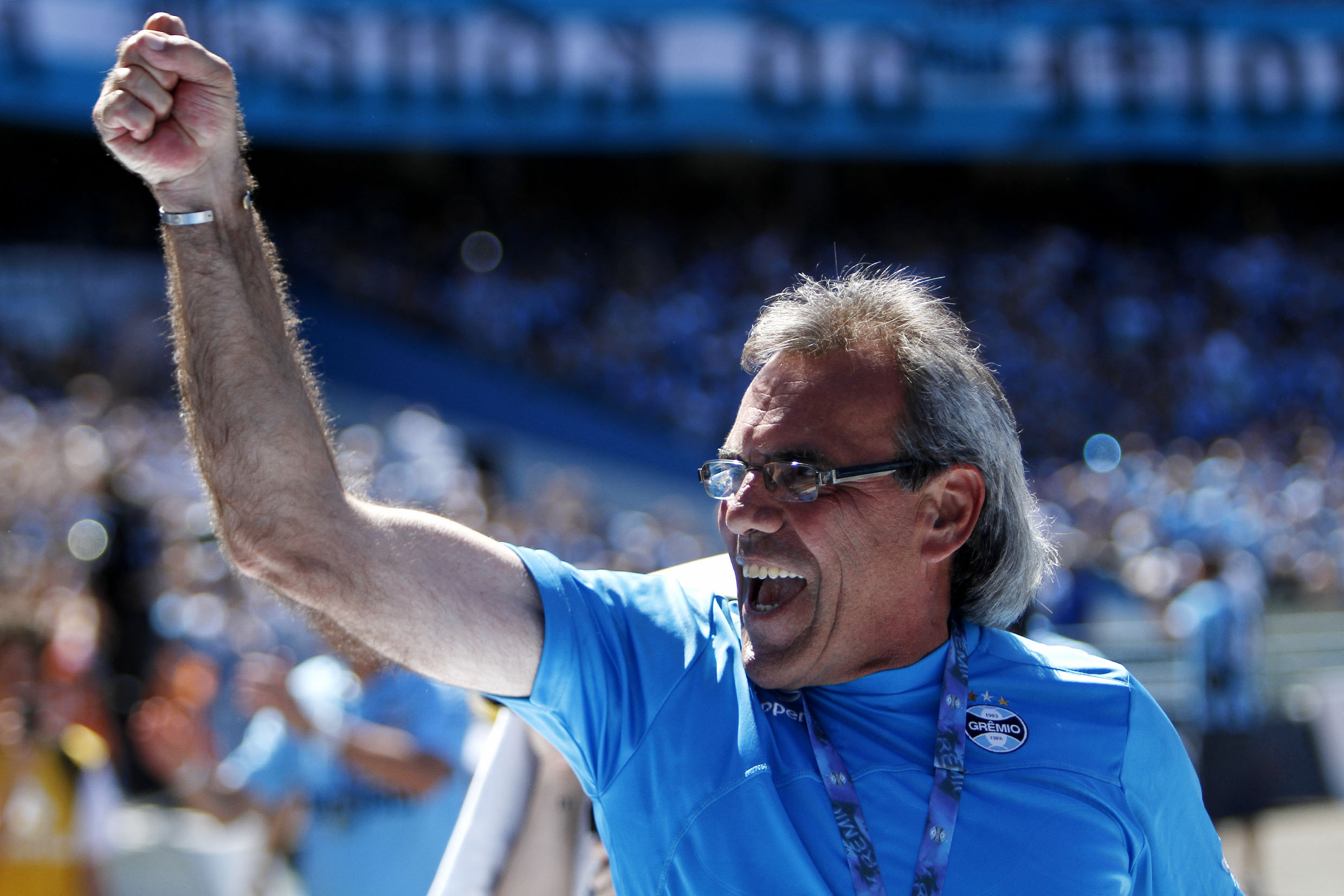
Mazarópi was the starting goalkeeper during the triumphant 1980s, becoming one of the club's most decorated players. He won six Campeonato Gaúcho titles (1985, 1986, 1987, 1988, 1989, and 1990), the Copa Libertadores and Intercontinental Cup in 1983, the 1989 Copa do Brasil, and the 1990 Supercopa do Brasil.

It can be argued that 1983 was the most successful year in the club's history in terms of titles. During this period, Grêmio won the 1983 Copa Libertadores and the 1983 Intercontinental Cup, both unprecedented titles for Rio Grande do Sul. The Libertadores triumph was achieved in stages: in the first phase, the Tricolor topped its group and avenged the previous year's Brasileirão loss by eliminating Flamengo, which failed to advance; in the second phase, Grêmio competed in a group of three teams with Estudiantes de La Plata (in a match known as the Battle of La Plata, where Grêmio was forced to settle for a draw after leading 3–1 due to unsafe conditions) and América de Cali; having won the previous group, the final was set against Peñarol, which Grêmio defeated 3–2 on aggregate (1–1 and 2–1), with standout performances by Tita (who scored in Montevideo), César (who netted the decisive goal in Porto Alegre), and Renato Portaluppi (who provided the assist for César's goal).

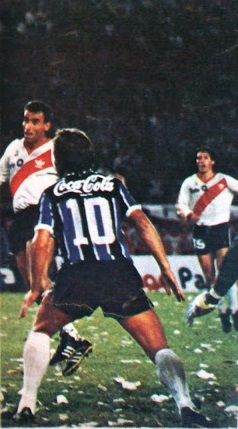
Quarterfinals of the 1988 Supercopa Libertadores between Grêmio and River Plate. In the image, Paulo Afonso Bonamigo wearing the number 10 shirt, marking Argentine players.

With the Libertadores victory, Grêmio qualified for the Club World Cup in Tokyo against Hamburg, which had won the European Cup (predecessor to the UEFA Champions League) by defeating Juventus in the final. Prioritizing the World Cup, Grêmio finished third in the 1983 Campeonato Gaúcho. The historic match took place on December 11, 1983, at the Tokyo Olympic Stadium. After taking the lead with a goal by Renato Portaluppi, the Tricolor conceded an equalizer to the Germans in the final minutes. The match went to extra time, where Portaluppi shone, scoring the winning goal three minutes in. As it was not sudden death, Grêmio held the lead until the end, celebrating the club's greatest title. Renato, the match's hero, was named man of the match. Grêmio became the first Rio Grande do Sul team to be recognized as World Champions by FIFA.

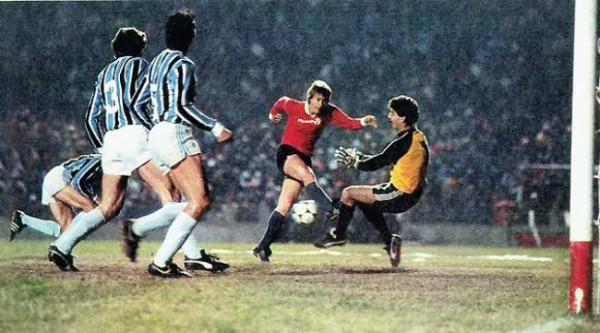
Final of the 1984 Copa Libertadores, Grêmio came close to a second title but was defeated by Independiente in the final.

In Porto Alegre, the fans celebrated in ecstasy. On the return journey, Grêmio also won the Los Angeles Cup in Los Angeles, defeating Club América 4–3 on penalties after a 2–2 draw. Upon arriving in Porto Alegre, the champion delegation paraded through the streets in a fire truck.

In 1984, Grêmio fell just short of repeating the previous year's success. After reaching the 1984 Copa Libertadores final again, it was defeated by Independiente 1–0 on aggregate (0–1 at home and 0–0 away). However, the club won six consecutive Gaúcho titles (1985–1990).

The title brought immense visibility to the club, leading to invitations to various international tournaments. Some of the most notable victories included the Palma de Mallorca Trophy (Spain) and the Rotterdam Cup (Netherlands) in 1985, and the Philips Cup (Netherlands and Switzerland) in 1986 and 1987. The club had already participated in foreign tournaments, having won the El Salvador del Mundo Cup (El Salvador) and the Ciudad de Valladolid Trophy (Valladolid) in 1981. Noteworthy campaigns include Grêmio's performances in the 1988 Supercopa Libertadores and 1989 Supercopa Libertadores, reaching the quarterfinals and third place, respectively. This team formed the foundation for Grêmio's victory in the inaugural Copa do Brasil in 1989. The title was won undefeated, with ten matches, eight wins, two draws, 26 goals scored, and only four conceded. During the campaign, Grêmio defeated strong opponents such as Bahia (the previous year's Brazilian champion, defeating Internacional) and Flamengo (including a historic 6–1 thrashing at the Olímpico after a 2–2 draw at the Maracanã). The final was against Sport Club do Recife, which had eliminated Goiás in the semifinals. As the team with the best campaign, Grêmio hosted the second leg at the Olímpico. The first match, on August 26 in Recife, ended in a 0–0 draw, leaving fans anxious for the return leg. A draw with goals in the second leg would favor Sport. Over 60,000 fans filled the Olímpico on September 2. At the 8th minute, Nando crossed into the box, the opposing defense failed to clear, and Assis scored on the rebound to make it 1–0. At the 31st minute, Aílton took a corner, Mazarópi attempted to clear but pushed the ball into his own net, resulting in a 1–1 score. Despite the error, the crowd chanted Mazarópi's name. The winning goal came in the second half. At the 6th minute, Luís Eduardo crossed, the ball passed Lino, and found Cuca, who scored with his left foot past goalkeeper Rafael, securing a 2–1 victory. The Olímpico erupted in celebration, and Grêmio claimed the unprecedented trophy.

That same year, the CBF established a new national competition, pitting the Copa do Brasil champion against the Campeonato Brasileiro champion in a two-leg match, modeled after the Supercopa de España. Grêmio participated in the inaugural 1990 Supercopa do Brasil, as the 1989 Copa do Brasil champion, facing Vasco da Gama, the 1989 Campeonato Brasileiro champion. Due to scheduling constraints, the title was decided during the 1990 Copa Libertadores matches. The competition was discontinued in 1992, resuming only in 2020.

== 1991–2002: Relegation and Libertadores triumph ==
In 1991, Grêmio reached the Copa do Brasil final for the second time but was defeated by Criciúma, coached by Luiz Felipe Scolari, who would later become one of the club's most celebrated managers in the decade. However, that same year, the Tricolor was relegated to the second division of the Campeonato Brasileiro for the first time.

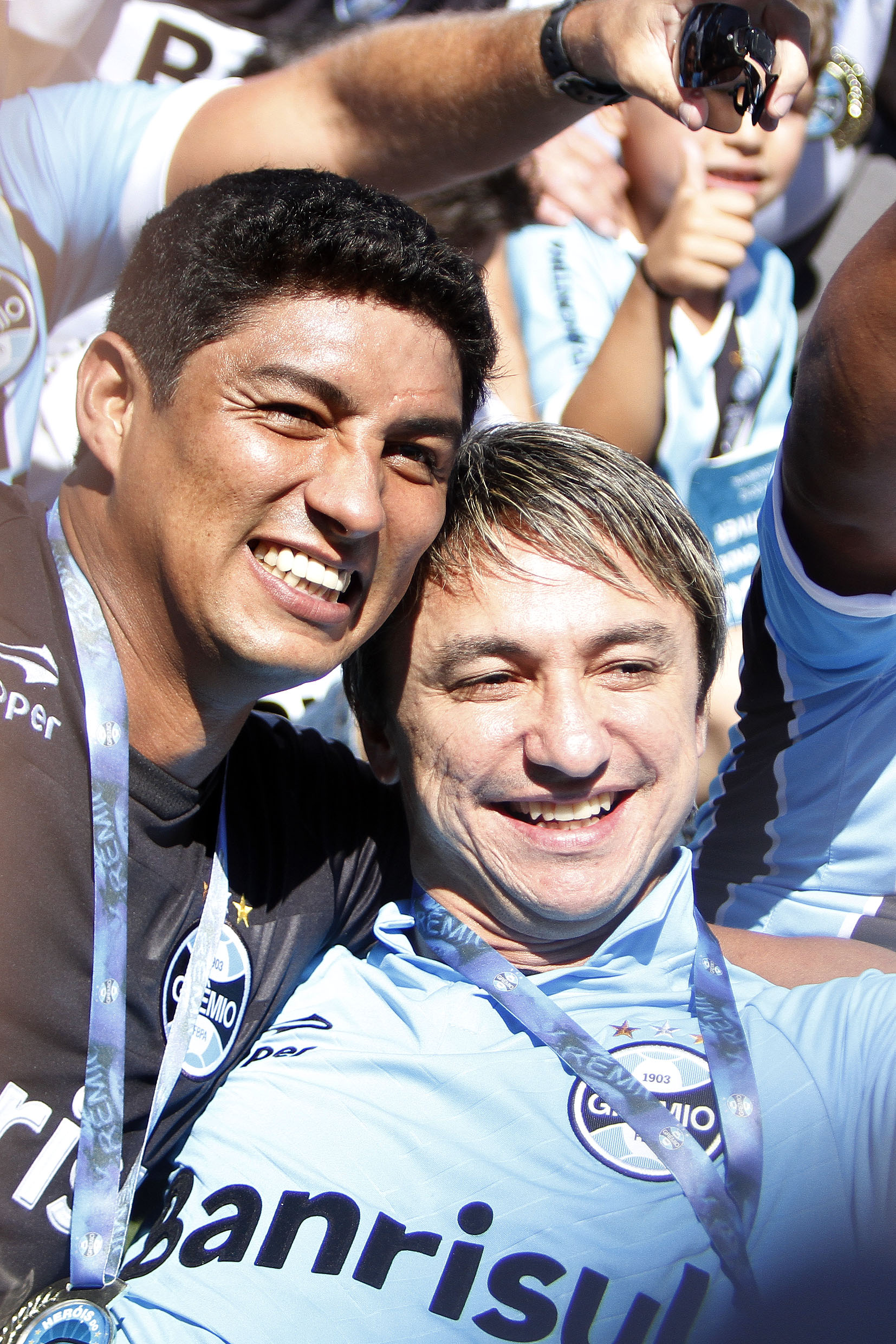
Jardel and Paulo Nunes were the standout players of the 1990s. Both won two Campeonato Gaúcho titles (1995 and 1996), a Copa Libertadores, and a Recopa Sudamericana. Paulo Nunes also secured the 1996 Campeonato Brasileiro and the 1997 Copa do Brasil.

In 1993, the Tricolor reclaimed the Campeonato Gaúcho, which it had not won since 1990. That same year, Luiz Felipe Scolari, who had previously coached the club in 1987, was rehired as manager. Also in 1993, the team reached another national final, finishing as runner-up in the 1993 Copa do Brasil. The following year, Scolari's team clinched the title, defeating Ceará in the final. This victory earned Grêmio a spot in the 1995 Copa Libertadores. The team had not competed in the competition since 1990 but performed exceptionally well despite the hiatus.

Scolari's team featured the attacking duo of Paulo Nunes and Jardel, with Danrlei in goal, three of the club's key players. Despite not having a robust squad, the team progressed through the competition. The highlight before the final was the quarterfinal against Palmeiras: in Porto Alegre, Grêmio won 5–0, while in São Paulo, Palmeiras won 5–1. In the semifinals, Grêmio faced Emelec: a 0–0 draw in Guayaquil and a 2–0 win in Porto Alegre. The final opponent was Atlético Nacional. With a 3–1 victory at home and a 1–1 draw away, the title went to the Brazilians. In 1995, Grêmio also won the Sanwa Bank Cup.

Qualified for the 1995 Intercontinental Cup against Ajax, the team drew 0–0 against the Dutch side but lost 4–3 on penalties.

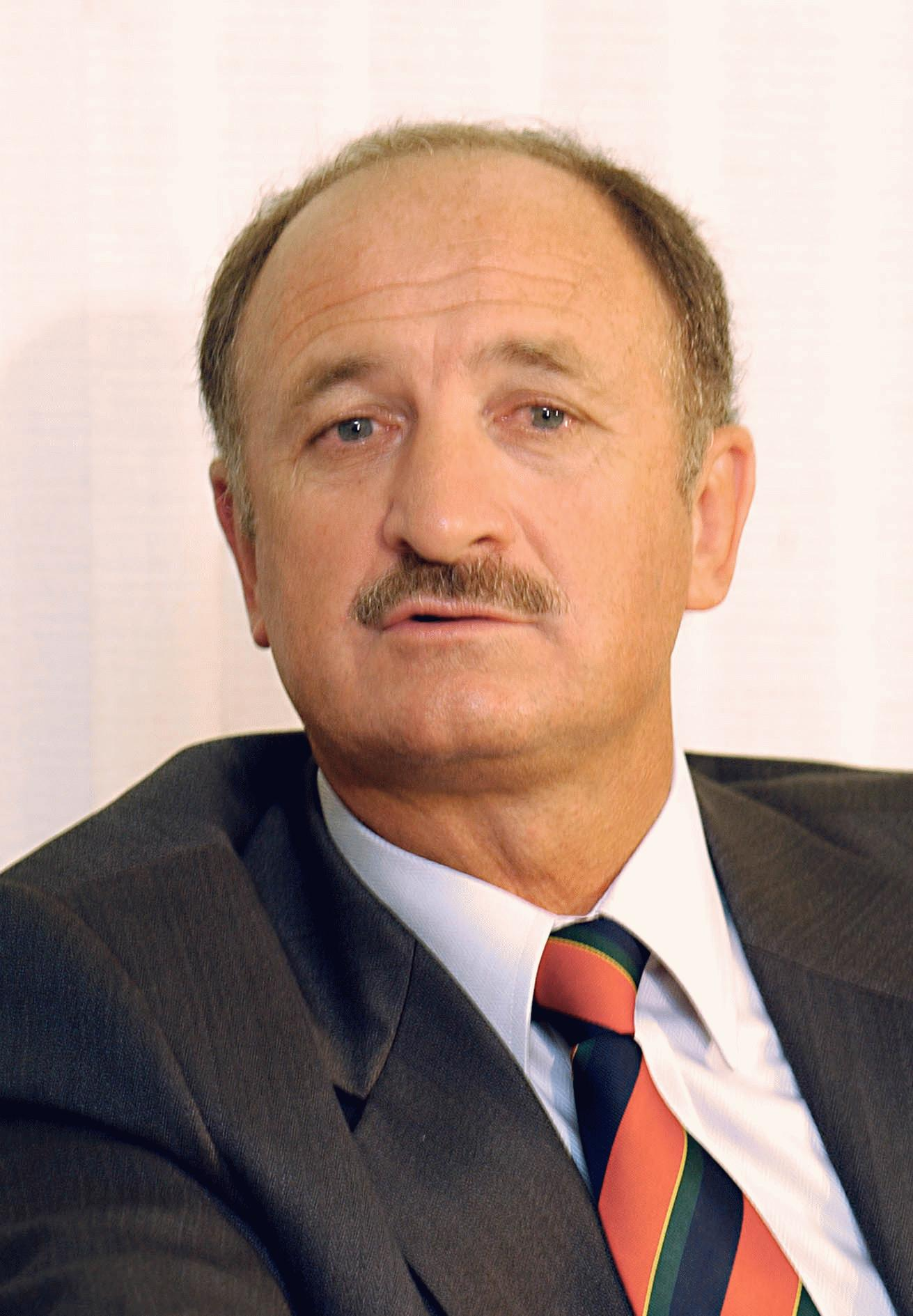
Felipão won the 1995 Libertadores and was runner-up in the 1995 Intercontinental Cup.

However, the following year, the club delivered another title to its fans: the second 1996 Campeonato Brasileiro, secured after a 2–0 loss in São Paulo against Portuguesa de Desportos and a 2–0 victory in Porto Alegre, with a goal by Ailton in the final minutes. Also in 1996, the Tricolor won the 1996 Recopa Sudamericana, defeating Independiente 4–1. The following year, the most significant title was the 1997 Copa do Brasil, won against Flamengo (0–0 at home and 2–2 away).

In 1999, Grêmio won the Copa Sul and the 1999 Campeonato Gaúcho.

In 2000, the club's leadership, under president José Alberto Guerreiro, signed a contract with the Swiss company ISL. The company would fund player acquisitions for Grêmio, covering their salaries.

Through this partnership, the club brought in players such as Amato, Astrada, Paulo Nunes, and Zinho. The first three were paid for by ISL with three checks in Grêmio's name, totaling 500,000 reais, but the clubs owning their rights never received the funds, which were diverted. After ISL's bankruptcy, it was revealed that Grêmio was financially crippled, as it had to cover costs previously borne by the partner company.

In 2001, the club won the 2001 Copa do Brasil in a final against Corinthians (2–2 at home and 3–1 away), becoming a four-time champion of the tournament.

In the 2002 Copa Libertadores, the team reached the semifinals but was eliminated by Olimpia on penalties, 5–4.

== 2003–2004: Second relegation ==
In its centenary year, 2003, Grêmio narrowly avoided relegation, securing safety in the final round with a 3–0 victory over Corinthians. From that year onward, Grêmio faced the peak of its financial crisis. Due to the situation left by ISL and previous administrations, the club reached an unsustainable state.

The Tricolor accumulated debts in labor obligations to players, staff, and other clubs. In 2004, with little cash and a debt of 101.7 million reais, the team was assembled on a limited budget and performed poorly.

In the 2004 Campeonato Brasileiro, Grêmio won only nine of forty-six possible matches and was relegated to the Série B for the second time. The club's accumulated debts are considered a critical factor in its relegation.

== 2005–2008: Return to Série A and runner-up finishes ==
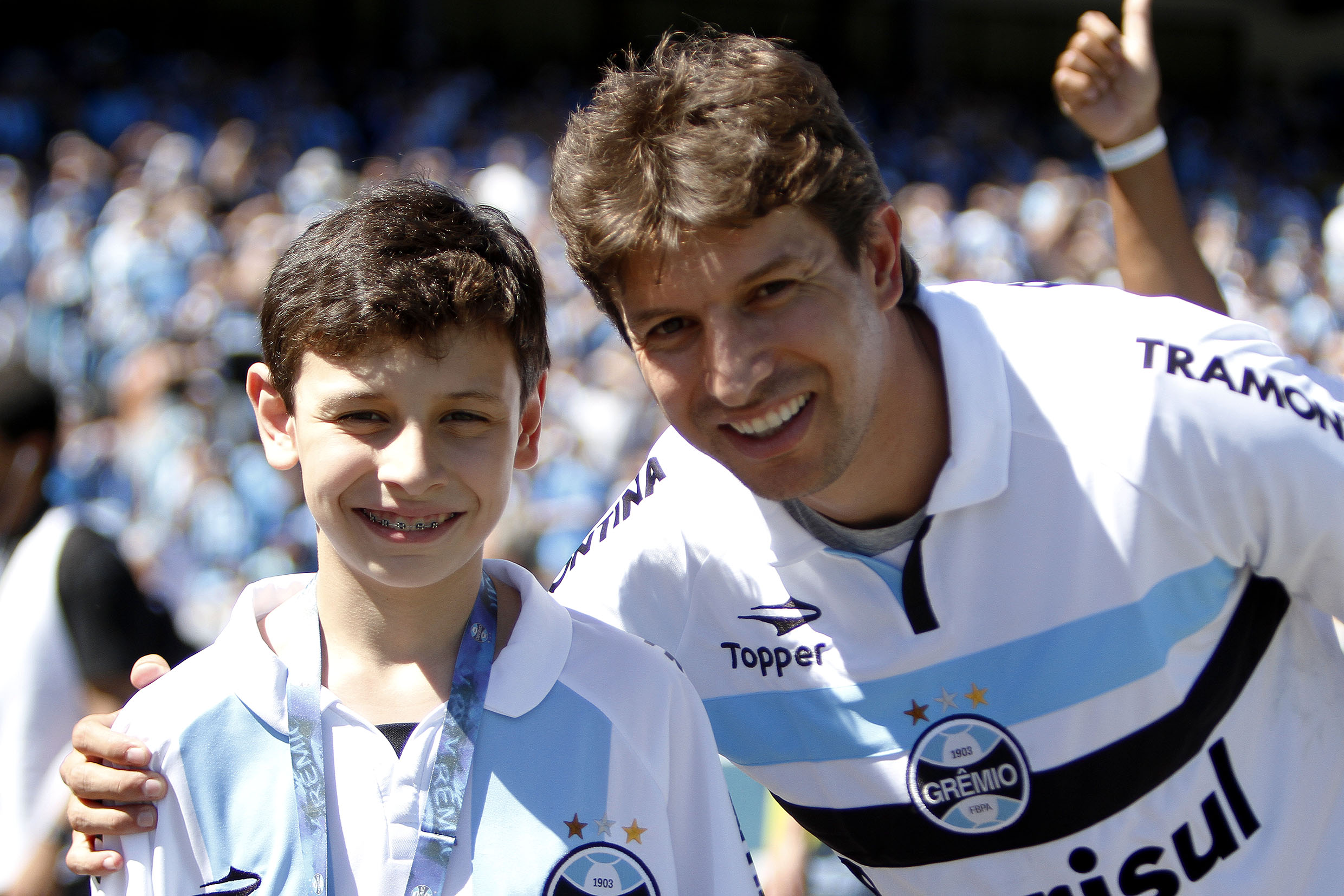
Tcheco was the number 10 and captain in the Grêmio vs. Boca Juniors finals of the 2007 Copa Libertadores.

In 2005, still financially strained, Grêmio remained on the brink of bankruptcy. The debt reached 108 million reais, with 56 million due in the short term. Paulo Odone took over as president, succeeding Flávio Obino, whose term ended the previous year. To address the situation, club legend Hugo De León was hired as coach. In the Campeonato Gaúcho, the team struggled. To reverse the situation, Mano Menezes was hired to replace the Uruguayan.

In the Série B, Grêmio started poorly but qualified among the top eight, advancing to the finals. In this phase, the team squandered chances against Portuguesa de Desportos and Santa Cruz. Promotion was decided against Náutico at the Estádio dos Aflitos in Recife. Despite having two penalties called against them (both missed by the opponent) and four players sent off, the Tricolor managed to score the title-winning goal, netted by Anderson. Thus, the team secured a return to Série A, in a match famously known as the Battle of Aflitos.

Back among the elite in 2006, Grêmio reclaimed hegemony in Rio Grande do Sul by winning its thirty-fourth Campeonato Gaúcho after two draws (0–0 and 1–1), securing the title due to the away goals rule. In the 2006 Campeonato Brasileiro, the team exceeded expectations, finishing third after an inconsistent start, qualifying for the Copa Libertadores the following year. In 2007, Grêmio won the Gaúcho title again. In the 2007 Copa Libertadores, the team reached the final but was defeated by Boca Juniors (3–0 away and 0–2 at home). In the 2007 Campeonato Brasileiro, Grêmio finished sixth.

In 2008, the team faced a turbulent start. Vagner Mancini, recently hired to replace Mano Menezes, was sacked after six matches without a loss. Celso Roth was hired to take his place. After eliminations in the Campeonato Gaúcho and Copa do Brasil by Juventude and Atlético Goianiense, respectively, a significant portion of the fanbase demanded Roth's dismissal. Football director Paulo Pelaipe, who had been with the club since its 2005 promotion, left due to this pressure. Despite this, new football director André Krieger retained Roth. Consequently, Roth led the team to a runner-up finish in the Campeonato Brasileiro, a remarkable achievement given his initial lack of support. This turned the fans in his favor. The final Brasileirão ranking secured Grêmio's qualification for the 2009 Copa Libertadores.

== 2009–2012: Inconsistencies and farewell to the Olímpico ==
Duda Kroeff, son of club patron Fernando Kroeff, assumed the presidency in 2009 after winning the election against Antônio Vicente Martins, the incumbent candidate. After another defeat in a Grenal, coach Celso Roth was sacked. Marcelo Rospide took over as interim coach until Paulo Autuori arrived in late May.

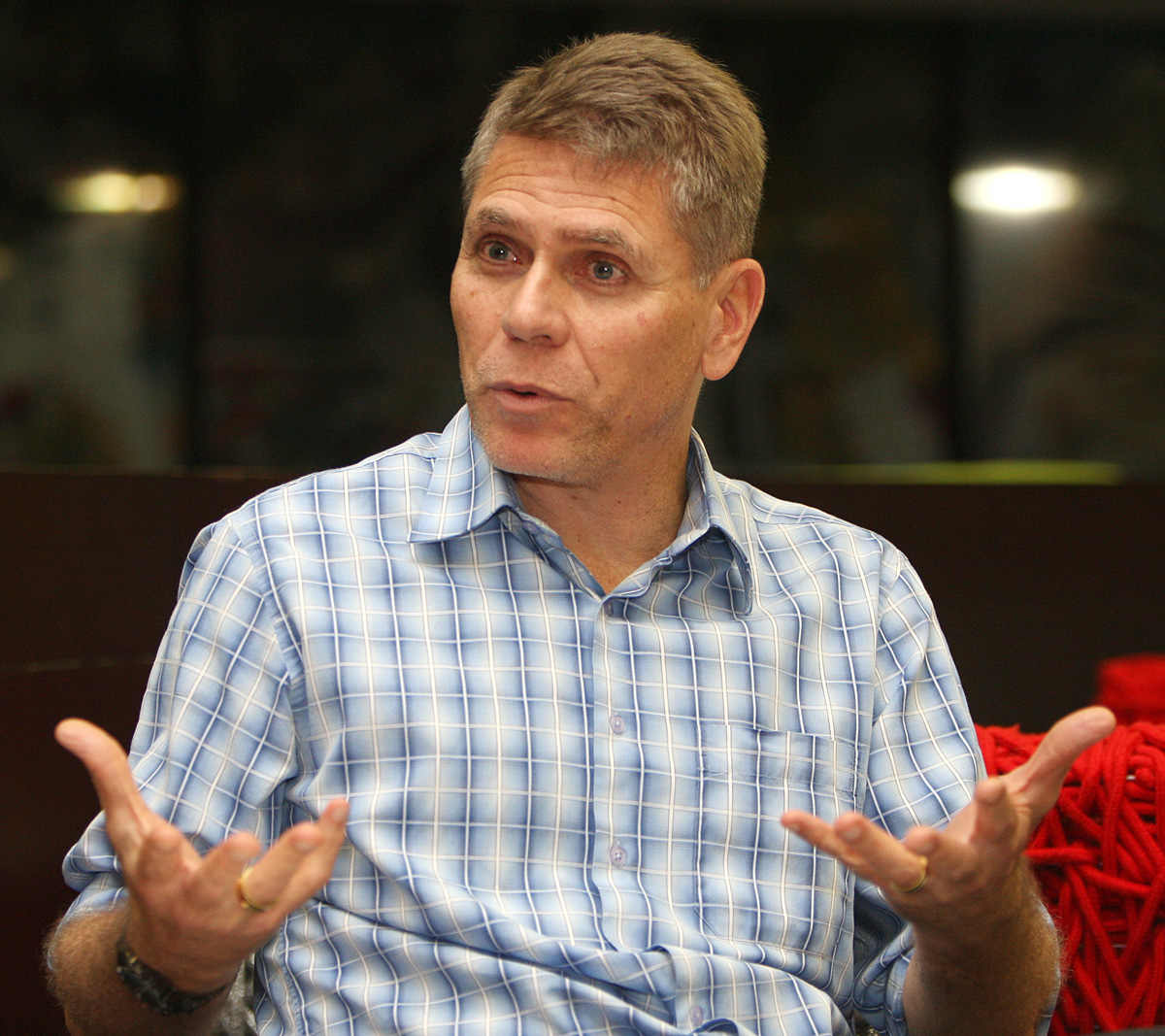
Paulo Autuori coached the team in the 2009 Copa Libertadores.

The team was eliminated from the 2009 Copa Libertadores in the semifinals, losing 5–3 on aggregate (3–1 away and 2–2 at home) to Cruzeiro. Between August 2008 and July 2009, according to the IFFHS ranking, Grêmio was ninth among world clubs, the highest-ranked Brazilian team and second in South America, behind only Estudiantes de La Plata, the then Copa Libertadores champion.

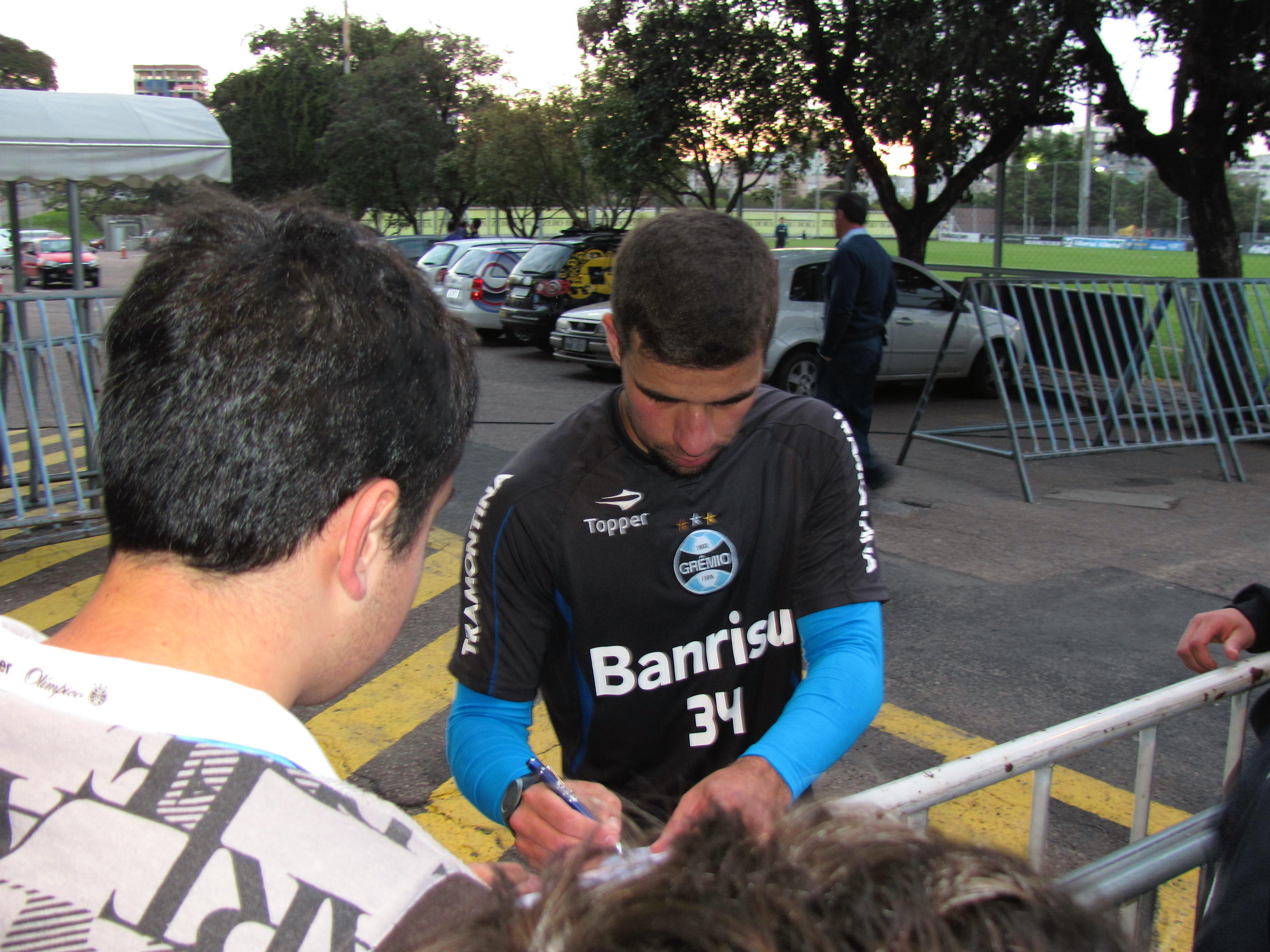
André Lima was signed on June 21, 2010, and later scored the first goal at the Arena do Grêmio.

The end of 2009 also marked the farewell of captain Tcheco. The player was with Grêmio from 2006 to 2009 and was a standout since the team's return to Série A. With 182 matches for Grêmio, he scored 43 goals and won two Campeonato Gaúcho titles (2006 and 2007), as well as a runner-up finish in the Copa Libertadores and the Campeonato Brasileiro. He also earned individual accolades, including second-best right midfielder in the 2008 Campeonato Brasileiro and the Bola de Prata from Placar in 2008. His farewell match was on November 29 against Barueri at the Olímpico, with Grêmio winning 4–2.

In the 2009 Campeonato Brasileiro, the club finished in a modest eighth place but achieved a unique feat in the points era, completing the championship undefeated at home. In the final round, Flamengo defeated Grêmio 2–1 at the Maracanã to claim the title. Internacional, along with São Paulo and Palmeiras, could have won the championship had Grêmio prevailed. After the match, Duda Kroeff announced that Silas would be the club's coach for the next season. The president also confirmed the hiring of Paulo Paixão as physical trainer.

In 2010, the club's schedule included four competitions: the 2010 Campeonato Gaúcho, the 2010 Copa do Brasil, the 2010 Campeonato Brasileiro Série A, and the 2010 Copa Sudamericana. On January 17, coach Silas debuted with a 3–2 comeback victory over Pelotas at the Estádio Boca do Lobo. In that match, Henrique, Ferdinando, Leandro, and Borges made their debuts for the club.

Grêmio won the first round of the 2010 Campeonato Gaúcho (Fernando Carvalho Trophy), defeating Novo Hamburgo 1–0 at the Olímpico Monumental. The 2010 team, led by Silas, surpassed a record set in 1979 under coach Orlando Fantoni, winning fifteen consecutive official matches. The streak began with a 5–1 victory over Universidade on February 7 in the 2010 Campeonato Gaúcho and ended with a 2–1 loss to Pelotas on April 8, valid for the Fábio Koff Trophy, the second round of the same competition. This defeat led to Grêmio's elimination from the Fábio Koff Trophy (second round of the Campeonato Gaúcho).

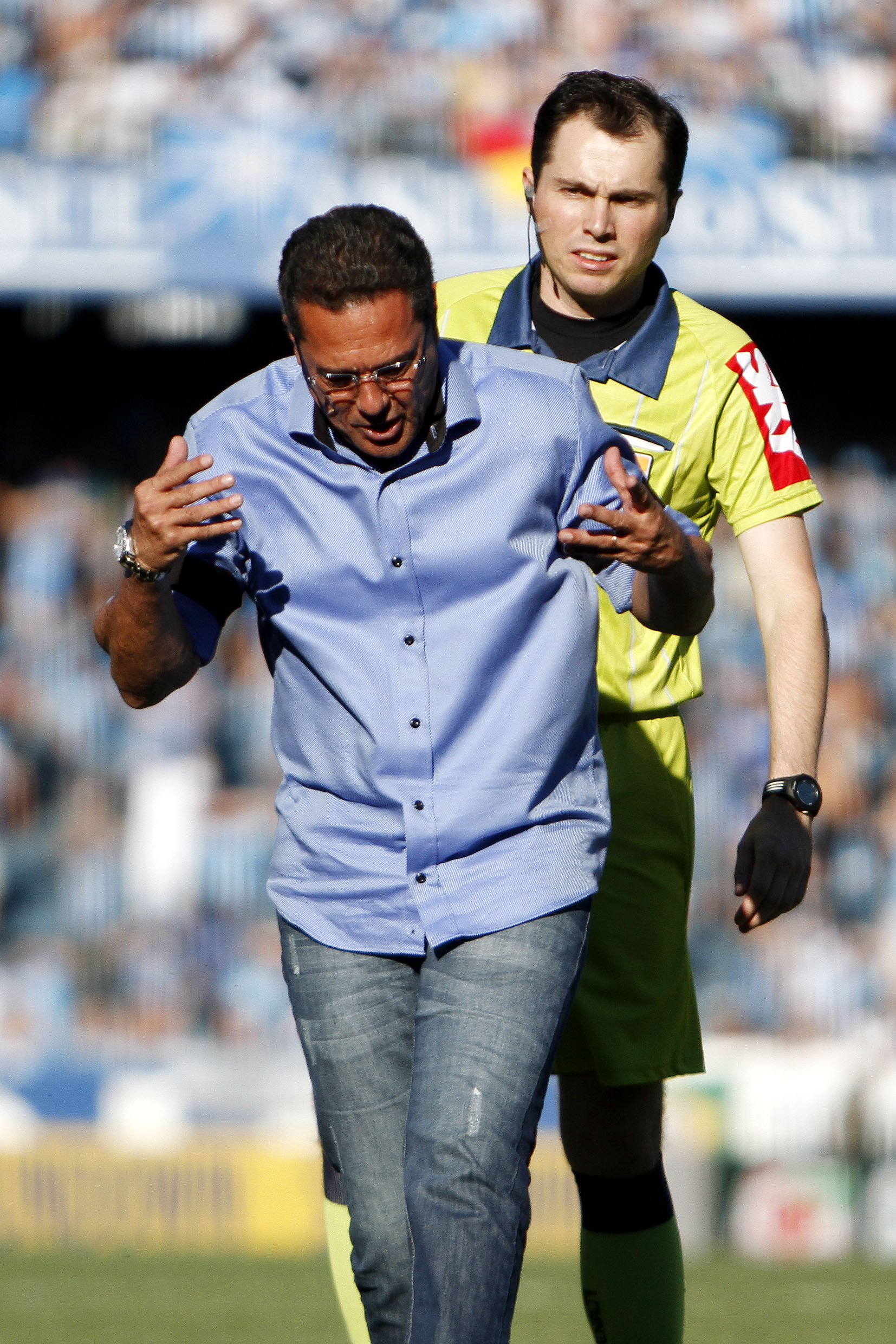
Vanderlei Luxemburgo coached the club between 2012 and 2013.

In the Campeonato Gaúcho final against Internacional, the second-round champion, Grêmio won the first leg 2–0 at the Beira-Rio but lost 1–0 at the Olímpico; with the aggregate result, the Tricolor claimed the state title. This was the club's 36th title in the competition.

In the Copa do Brasil, after eliminating Araguaia, Votoraty, Fluminense, and Avaí, Grêmio was defeated by Santos. After winning the first leg 4–3 at home, the Gaúcho club lost 3–1 at the Vila Belmiro, exiting in the semifinals; the São Paulo club went on to win the cup.

August marked a change in the coaching staff. Silas, the coach, and Luiz Onofre Meira, football director, were sacked on August 8 after a 2–1 home loss to Fluminense in the Campeonato Brasileiro. Renato Portaluppi, then coaching Bahia, was hired as coach.

In Portaluppi's debut, Grêmio lost 2–0 at home to Goiás and was eliminated from the Copa Sudamericana, having drawn the first leg 1–1.

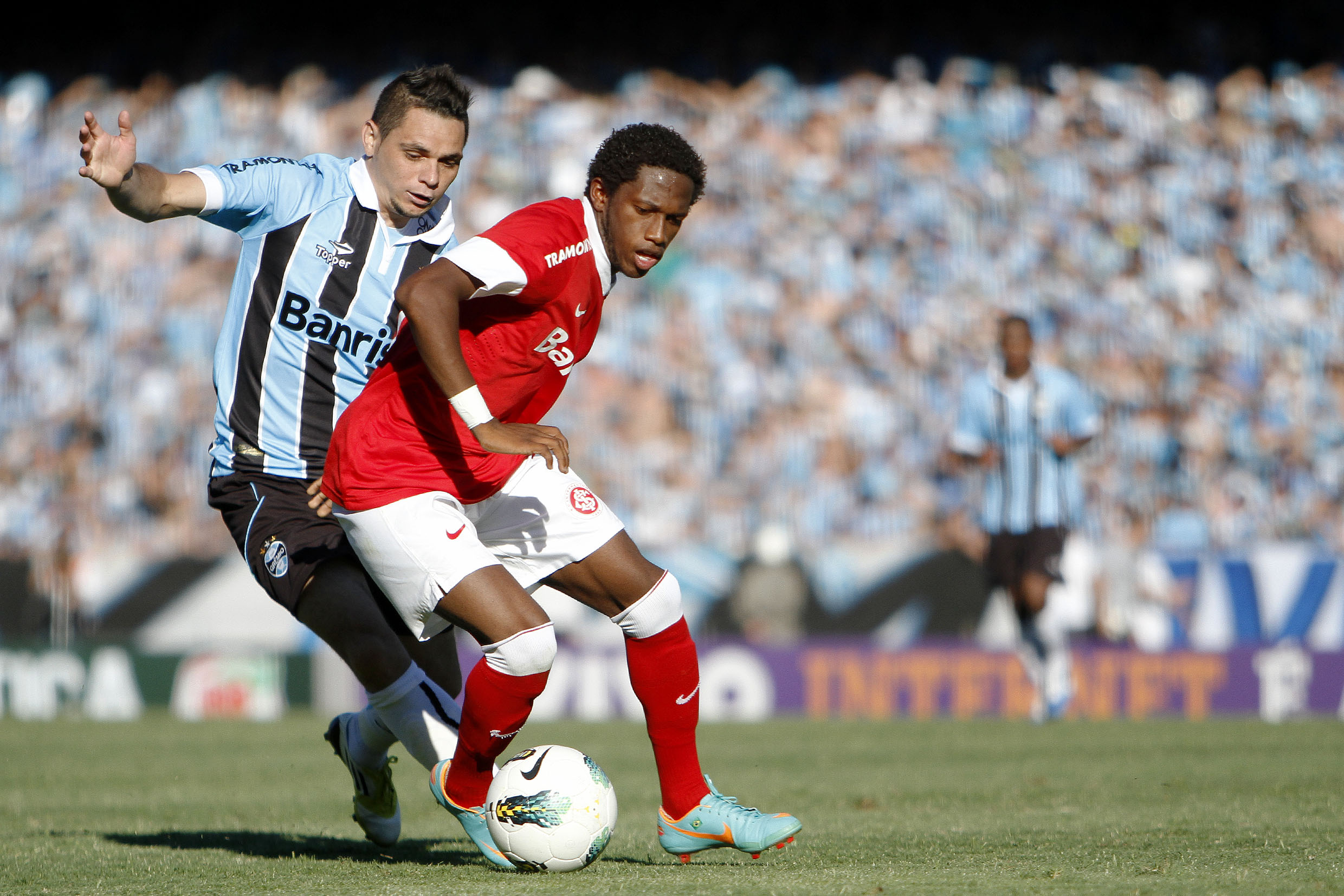
Pará and Fred during a Grenal in the 38th round of the 2012 Brasileirão Série A. This was the last match played at the Olímpico in the Brazilian Championship.

Silas left Grêmio in dire straits, in crisis and in the relegation zone. Renato Portaluppi, upon taking charge, restructured the team, leading it to fourth place by the end of the Campeonato Brasileiro. Even so, Grêmio's qualification for the 2011 Copa Libertadores depended on external results. Due to a rule change, the Copa Sudamericana champion would take the last spot from its country's league. The final between Independiente and Goiás, held after the Brasileirão, resulted in a victory for the Argentine club, securing Grêmio's qualification for the following year's Libertadores.

The season's highlights included striker Jonas, the Brasileirão top scorer with twenty-three goals, and Victor and Douglas, both nominated for the Prêmio Craque do Brasileirão.

In 2011, the club competed in the 2011 Copa Libertadores, the 2011 Campeonato Gaúcho, and the 2010 Campeonato Brasileiro Série A. In the Libertadores preliminary phase, Grêmio eliminated Liverpool with a 5–3 aggregate score, advancing to the group stage but starting the 2011 Brasileirão with a loss. However, it was eliminated in the round of 16 by Universidad Católica, with losses of 2–1 at the Olímpico and 1–0 in Santiago.

Grêmio's Brasileirão campaign was lackluster, finishing 12th with 48 points. Amid this, it was defeated by Internacional in the 2011 Campeonato Gaúcho final on penalties, 5–4, after a 3–2 loss in regular time at the Olímpico. In the first leg, Grêmio had won 3–2 at the Beira-Rio.

The year 2012 was promising. Grêmio aimed to bid farewell to the Olímpico with a title in the 2012 Copa do Brasil, 2012 Campeonato Brasileiro, or 2012 Copa Sudamericana. In the Gauchão, it was eliminated by Caxias in the first round and lost the second-round match to rival Internacional 2–1 at the Beira-Rio. In the Copa do Brasil, after defeating River Plate and Ipatinga, it eliminated traditional clubs Fortaleza and Bahia in later stages but suffered a frustrating 2–0 defeat at the Olímpico to Palmeiras and, despite attempting an upset in Barueri, a 1–1 draw knocked the Gaúcho team out of the tournament.

In the Brasileirão, Grêmio delivered a solid campaign, remaining among the top three for most of the competition, securing a spot in the 2013 Copa Libertadores after a 2–1 comeback victory over São Paulo at the Olímpico in front of 40,217 fans.

Guaranteed a Libertadores spot in the first year of the Arena, the Tricolor Gaúcho was eliminated from the 2012 Copa Sudamericana in the quarterfinals by Millonarios with a 3–1 loss in Bogotá. In the first leg, the Gaúcho team had won 1–0. Previously, it had eliminated Coritiba and Barcelona S.C.

== 2013–2016: Early years at the Arena ==
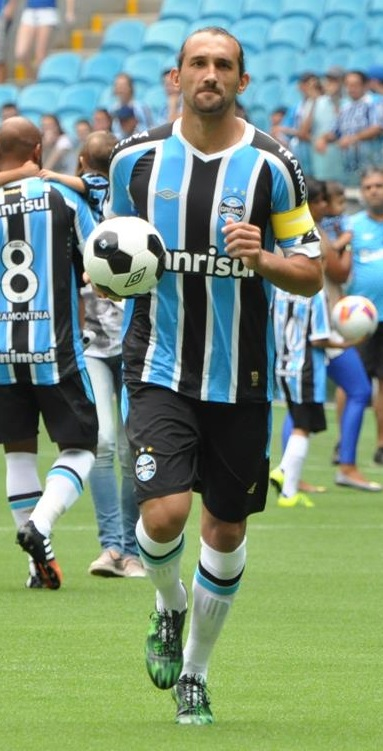
Forward Hernán Barcos, the second-highest scorer at the Arena do Grêmio. He played for the club from 2013 to 2015.

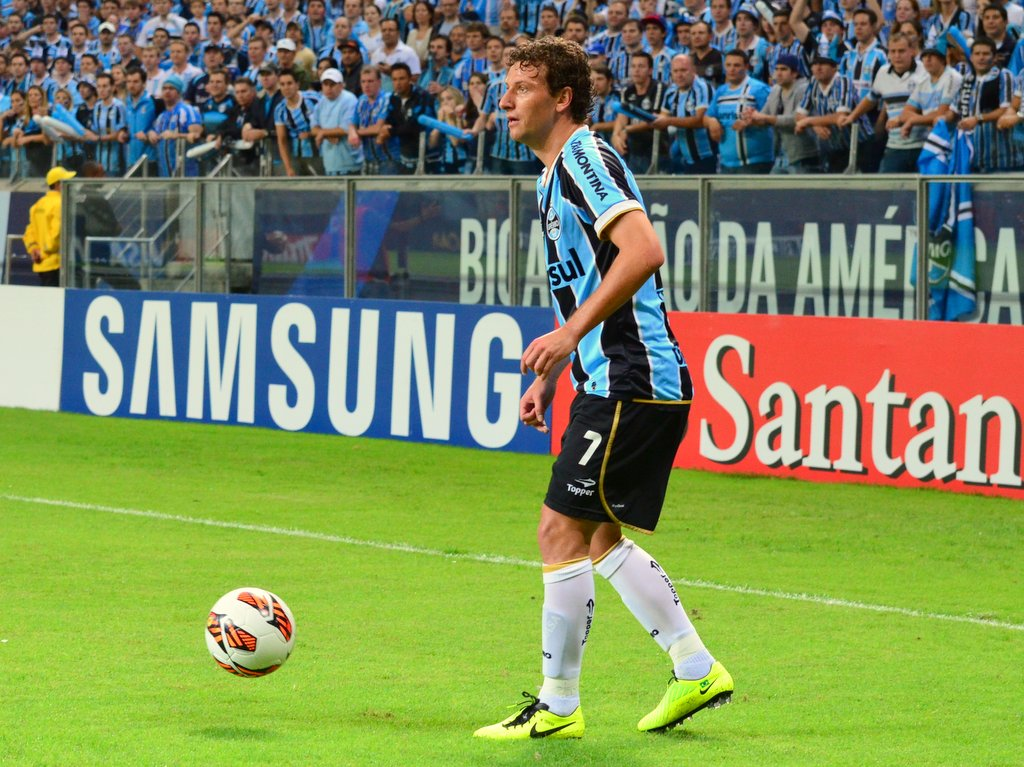
Elano played for Grêmio until 2014.

To advance to the 2013 Copa Libertadores second stage, Grêmio eliminated LDU on penalties in the 2013 Copa Libertadores first stage, qualifying for a group with Huachipato, Caracas, and Fluminense; it lost 1–0 at the opponent's home ground and won by the same score at the Arena.

Playing most of the state championship with reserves, Grêmio secured lower positions in the standings, facing Internacional in the Taça Piratini 2013 quarterfinals. Despite fielding an alternate squad, the team challenged the opponent but was eliminated early from the Rio Grande do Sul tournament. In the second round, another elimination: a 5–4 penalty shootout loss to Juventude at the Estádio Alfredo Jaconi, missing out on the title race. Eliminated from the 2013 Copa Libertadores in the round of 16 by Independiente Santa Fe, Grêmio, which had prioritized the competition over the 2013 Campeonato Gaúcho, ended the first half of 2013 without titles.

After the Libertadores elimination and an inconsistent start in the national championship, the club sacked coach Vanderlei Luxemburgo and announced the return of Renato Portaluppi to lead the team. Since then, in the Brasileirão, Grêmio remained in the qualification zone for the 2014 Copa Libertadores and confirmed its spot by finishing as runner-up in the national tournament. In the 2013 Copa do Brasil, Renato Portaluppi's team reached the semifinals but was eliminated by Atlético Paranaense after a 1–0 loss at the Vila Capanema and a draw 0–0 at the Arena.

The first Grenal at the new Arena do Grêmio (Gre-Nal 397) took place on August 4, 2013, ending in a 1–1 draw in the 2013 Brasileirão, with goals by Barcos for Grêmio and Leandro Damião for Internacional. At the end of 2013, Grêmio opted not to renew Renato Portaluppi's contract and announced the hiring of Enderson Moreira for the 2014 season.

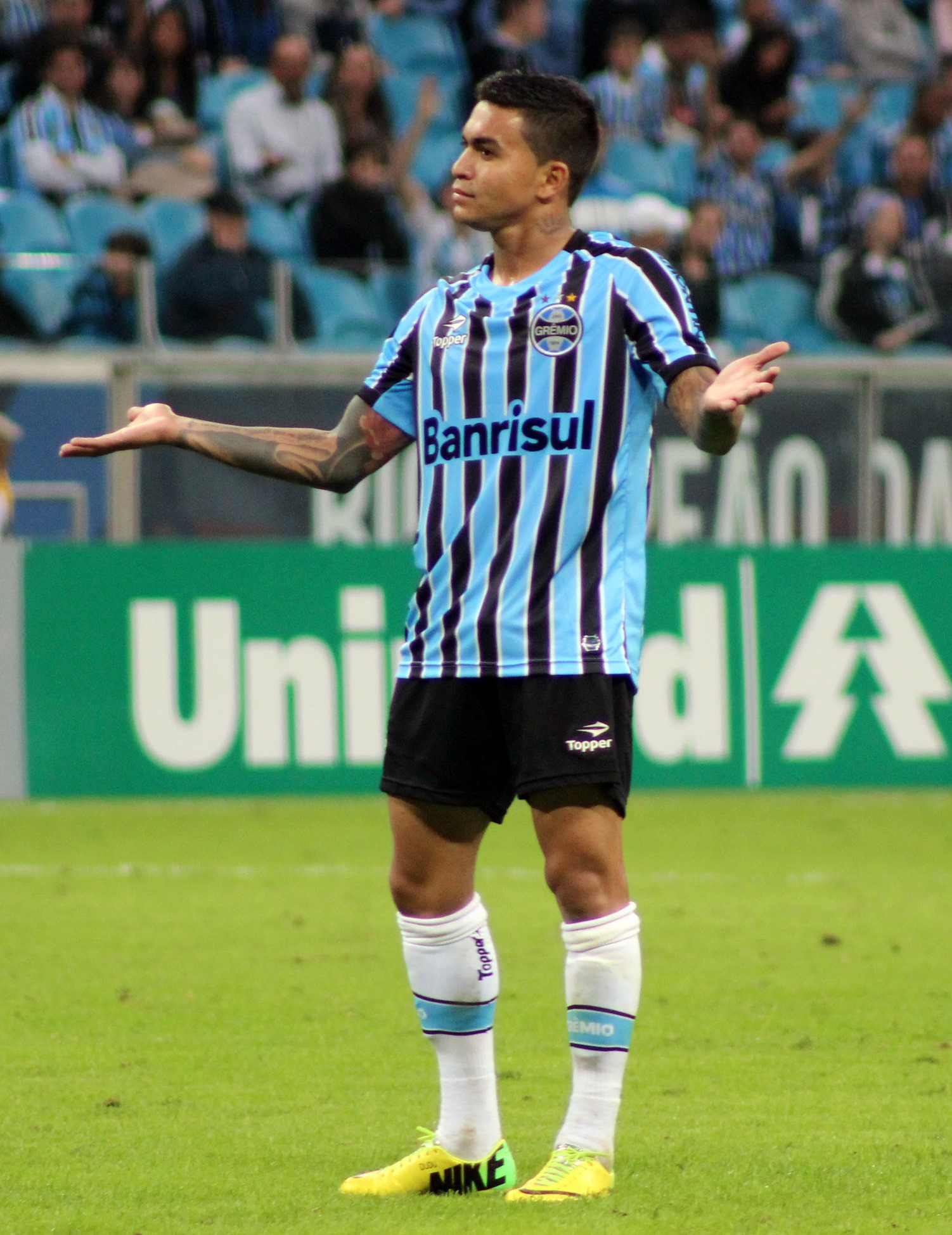
Forward Dudu played for the club throughout 2014.

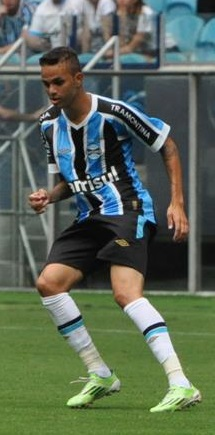
Luan was promoted from the youth ranks in 2014 and gradually became a starter. He later became a key player in winning the 2017 Copa Libertadores.

In 2014, the club competed in the Gauchão, the 2014 Copa Libertadores, the 2014 Campeonato Brasileiro, and the 2014 Copa do Brasil. It was in this year's Gauchão that Grêmio suffered its first Grenal defeat at the Arena, losing Gre-Nal 400 by 2–1, with goals by Barcos for Grêmio and Rafael Moura for Internacional, in the first leg of the Campeonato Gaúcho final. After a loss to Coritiba in the Brasileirão, coach Enderson Moreira was sacked, and Felipão, who had not coached the club since 1996, was hired in his place. After losing his debut match to Internacional, Felipão turned the tables in Grenal clashes with a 4–1 victory over Internacional in the Brasileirão, marking Gre-Nal 403 as the first Grêmio victory at the new Arena, ending a 2-year, 4-month, and 12-day drought in the classic. However, for the remainder of the season, Grêmio struggled to stabilize its results, and its league position excluded it from the following year's Libertadores.

After years of significant investments in infrastructure and the football department, 2015 marked a turning point for the Tricolor. Facing empty coffers and substantial debts, like many Brazilian clubs, the club's management opted for targeted, low-cost signings, negotiated the departure of high-profile players such as Marcelo Moreno, Barcos, and Riveros, and promoted several youth academy prospects. The expiration of loans for key players from the previous season also led to a significantly altered squad in the first half of the year compared to the one showcased in 2014. The results were modest: a second-place finish in the Campeonato Gaúcho and an inconsistent start in the Campeonato Brasileiro, which ultimately cost coach Felipão his job. Roger Machado, a successful former player for the club, was appointed as his replacement.

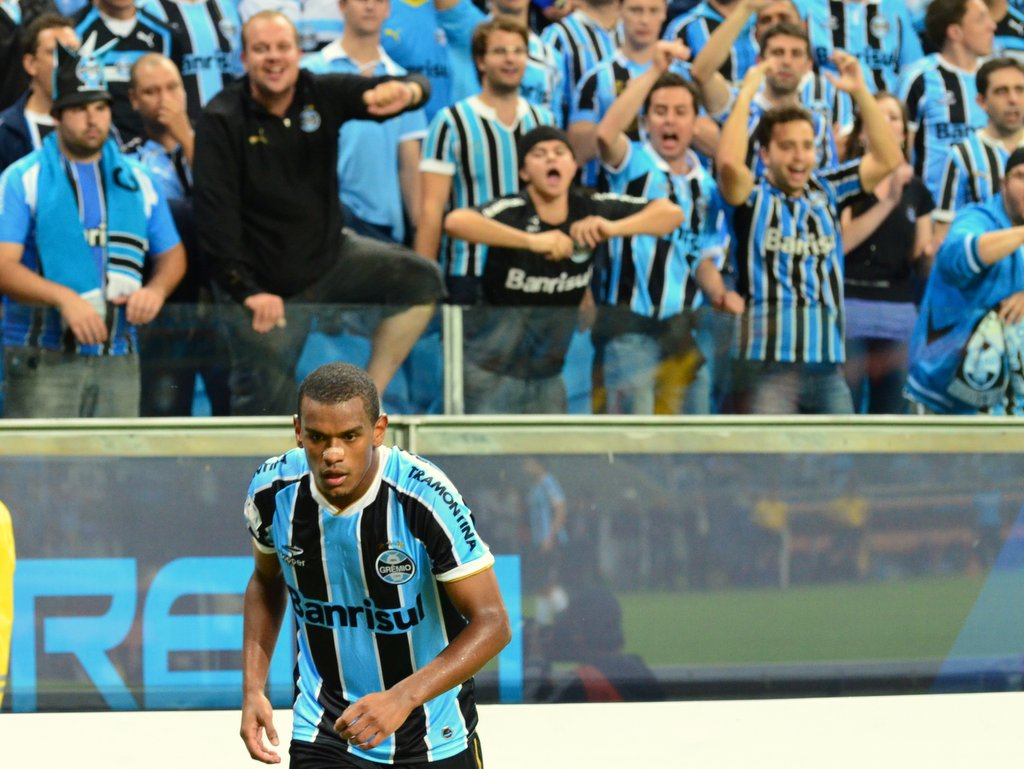
Fernando during a match for the 2013 Copa Libertadores against Club Independiente Santa Fe.

In his initial matches as Grêmio's coach, Roger Machado introduced a more dynamic style of play, inspired by European concepts of on-field productivity. This approach, characterized by intense and rapid ball movement, proved effective in his second game, where Grêmio scored twice in just four minutes to secure a 2–0 lead against Corinthians. The team then achieved four consecutive victories, surging to the top of the league table, a position they maintained consistently in subsequent rounds. Amid this collective progress, individual talents emerged, with players such as Luan, Giuliano, Douglas, Fernandinho, Pedro Rocha, and Erazo—previously criticized—gaining recognition from the press as some of Brazil's finest athletes. The team's success further solidified the reputations of players such as Wallace and Marcelo Grohe, who were already popular among fans but saw their fame grow with these results.

On August 9, 2015, the team, already enjoying a strong moment, made history by thrashing Internacional 5–0 in the 17th round of the Campeonato Brasileiro. This scoreline replicated a margin of victory not seen in over 50 years. Grêmio's display of football superiority - unusual in a derby known for its equilibrium - plunged Internacional into a technical and political crisis, with some fans calling for the president's resignation. Grêmio, meanwhile, gained momentum in the competition, confirming their fine form by defeating the league leaders, Atlético-MG, in the next round at Mineirão. That match featured a goal where Grêmio transitioned from their defensive third, exchanging 23 passes before scoring—a play celebrated worldwide as a "masterclass in counter-attacking." Grêmio finished the Campeonato Brasileiro in third place, behind only Corinthians and Atlético Mineiro, securing a spot in the 2016 Copa Libertadores. Notably, Grêmio was the only team not to lose to Corinthians throughout the tournament, defeating them 3–1 at home and drawing 1–1 away. Standout performers included goalkeeper Marcelo Grohe, the attacking duo of Luan and Pedro Rocha, the creative midfielder Douglas, Fernandinho, midfielder Maicon, and defender Pedro Geromel.

== 2016–2021 – The Renato Portaluppi era ==
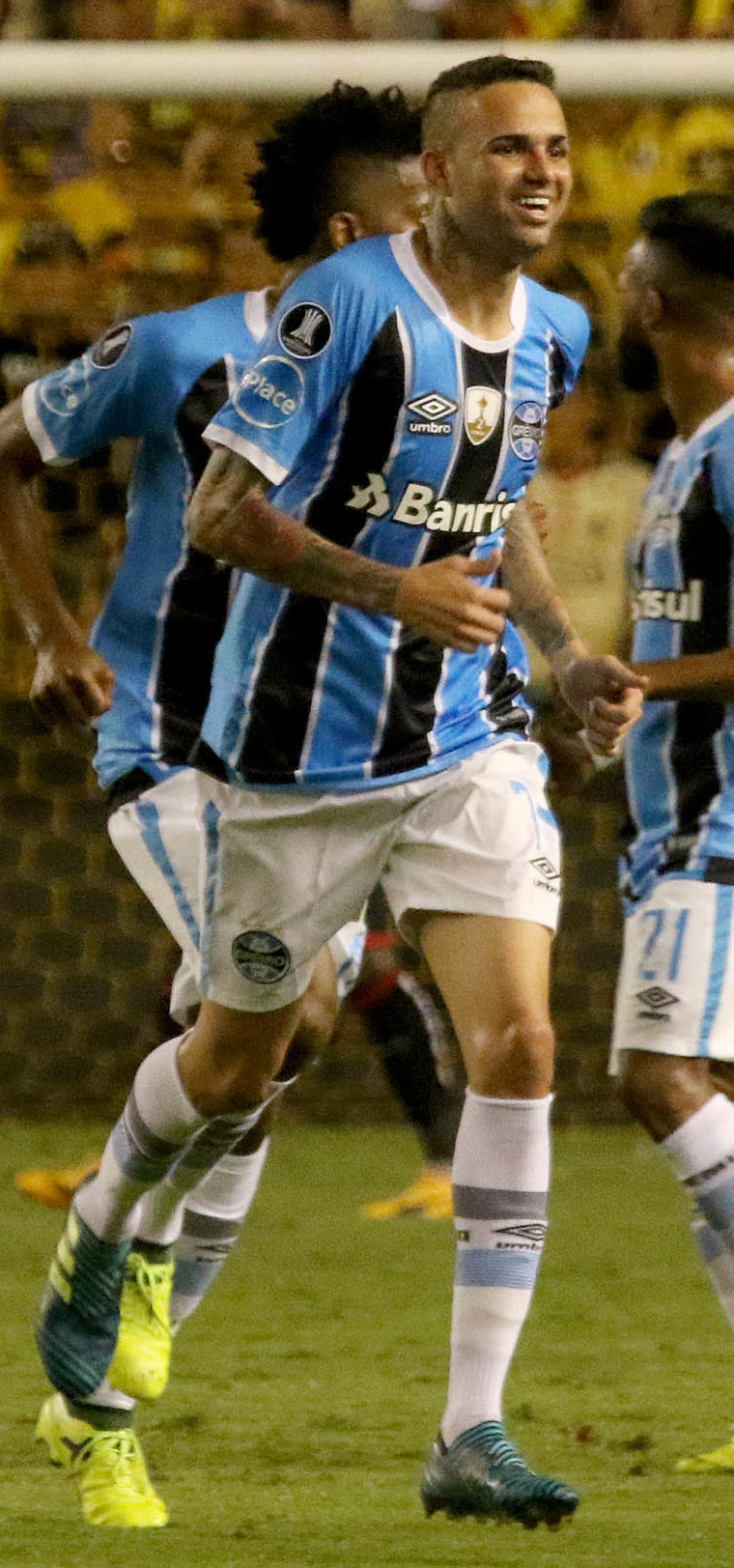
Luan Guilherme, voted the best player of the 2017 Copa Libertadores, and also named the King of America by El País (Uruguay) in 2017. Alongside Fernandinho, he scored in the title-winning victory over Lanús.

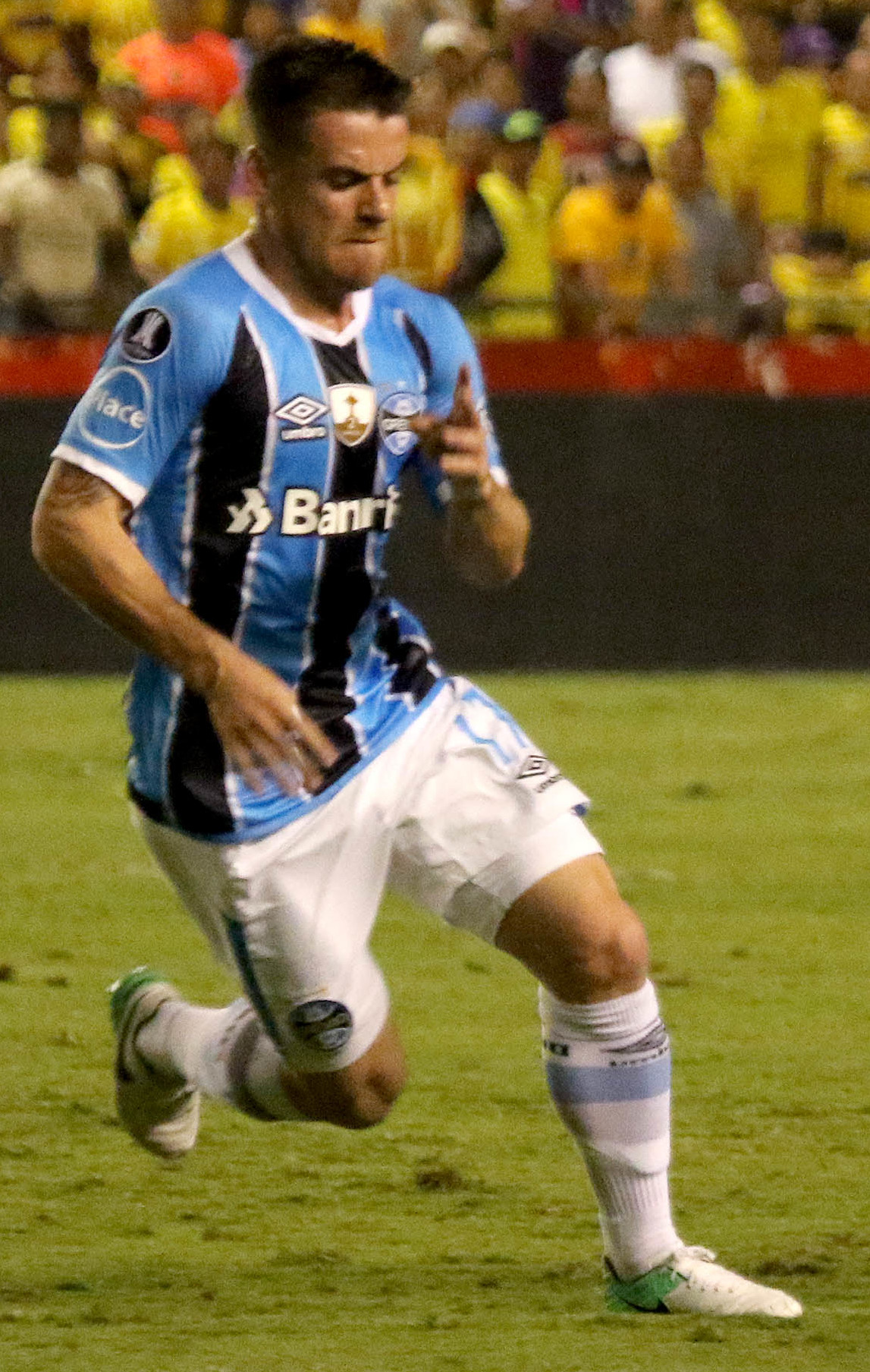
Ramiro, a key player, scored in the first leg of the round of 16 against Godoy Cruz.

The year 2016 was pivotal for Grêmio, as they clinched their fifth Copa do Brasil title, defeating Atlético/MG. This victory ended a six-year title drought and a 15-year wait for a major national trophy, the last being the 2010 Campeonato Gaúcho. The year began poorly, with Grêmio eliminated in the semifinals of the 2016 Campeonato Gaúcho by Juventude at the Arena do Grêmio. In the 2016 Copa Libertadores, after a decent group stage, Grêmio was knocked out in the round of 16 by Rosario Central. A mediocre campaign in the Campeonato Brasileiro led to the dismissal of coach Roger Machado, who was replaced by club icon Renato Gaúcho. Renato took charge from the second leg of the Copa do Brasil round of 16, guiding Grêmio past Atlético/PR on penalties after a 1–0 home loss. Under Roger, Grêmio had won the first leg 1–0 in Curitiba. On their path to the title, Grêmio eliminated Palmeiras and Cruzeiro before facing Atlético/MG in the final. The first leg, on November 23, 2016, at Mineirão, saw nearly 48,000 spectators witness Grêmio's 3–1 away victory, with two goals from Pedro Rocha and one from Everton. Gabriel scored for the hosts. In the second leg, Grêmio secured the title with a 1–1 draw, with goals from Miller Bolaños for Grêmio and Juan Cazares for Atlético/MG.

Grêmio topped the CBF Ranking in December 2016, amassing 15,038 points with their Copa do Brasil triumph. In December 2016, the CONMEBOL ranking for the 2017 Copa Libertadores was released, considering various technical parameters. Grêmio ranked as the sixth-best Brazilian club and 12th overall with 3,134 points. In the IFFHS World's Best Club Ranking for 2016, published on April 5, 2017, Grêmio was the second-best Brazilian club, placing 34th overall with 116 points for the period from January 1 to December 31.

Still buoyed by euphoria, Grêmio concluded their pre-season with optimism, retaining their core squad while expressing concerns about potential sales, renewals, and signings. The coaching staff and players remained, preserving the team's footballing philosophy. New additions to the squad included Léo Moura, Cortez, Michel, Jael, Beto da Silva, Barrios, and Bressan.

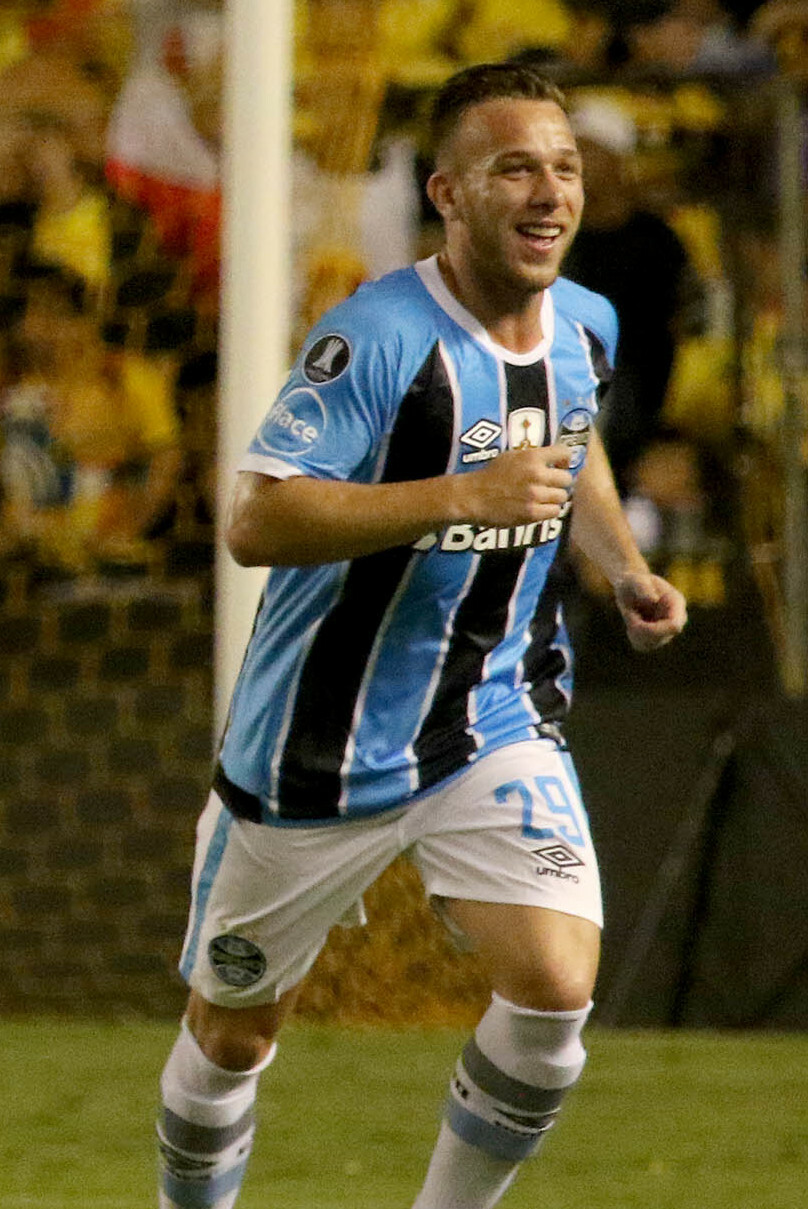
Arthur was voted the best player of the final match.

Although Grêmio's primary focus was the Copa Libertadores, they also aimed to win the Campeonato Gaúcho. However, inconsistent performances and numerous injuries hampered their state campaign. The Tricolor's routine was marked by wins, draws, and losses, never managing a sustained winning streak. Ultimately, they were defeated in the semifinals on penalties by Novo Hamburgo, who went on to win the title against Internacional, ending the rival's six-year hegemony. With less possession and greater directness, Grêmio increasingly adopted Renato Gaúcho's characteristics, excelling in counter-attacks or exploiting disorganized defenses. Under Roger, the emphasis was on passing, creating well-crafted plays. Defending their title in the 2017 Copa do Brasil, Grêmio reached the semifinals but lost on penalties to Cruzeiro 3–2 (1–0 in Porto Alegre and a 1–0 loss in Belo Horizonte). Cruzeiro later won the cup, tying Grêmio as the competition's most successful club.

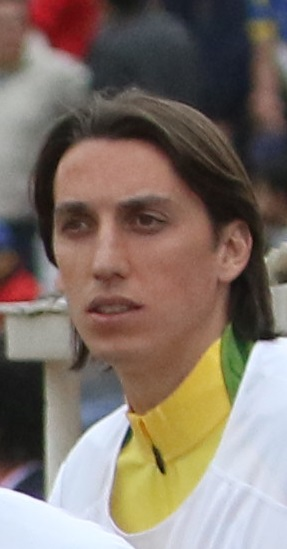
Pedro Geromel, captain who lifted the 2017 Copa Libertadores trophy, was named the competition's best defender by El País (Uruguay). He was also one of the 23 players called up by Tite for the 2018 FIFA World Cup.

In the 2017 Campeonato Brasileiro Série A, Grêmio led the table for one round, but with other competitions taking priority, they fielded mixed and reserve squads, losing crucial points that diminished their title chances against Corinthians, despite being in second place for many rounds. They finished in an honorable fourth place, securing a group stage spot in the next Libertadores. As the season's main goal, Grêmio topped their Libertadores group with 13 points (four wins, one draw, one loss). In the round of 16, they faced Godoy Cruz, winning 1–0 away and 2–1 at home. In the quarter-finals, they defeated Botafogo 1–0 on aggregate, thanks to a goal by Lucas Barrios in the home leg. In the semifinals, they faced Barcelona, who had already eliminated Palmeiras and Santos. Grêmio delivered a 3–0 thrashing in the first leg, virtually securing their place in the final.

This match featured a legendary save by Marcelo Grohe, lauded globally and compared to Gordon Banks' iconic save. Despite a 1–0 home loss in the second leg, Grêmio advanced to their fifth Libertadores final, facing Lanús, a club making their finals debut. In the first leg, Cícero scored to give Grêmio the advantage. In Argentina, undaunted by the hosts' pressure, Grêmio led 2–0 at halftime with goals from Luan and Fernandinho. José Sand pulled one back from a penalty for Lanús. Pedro Geromel joined Hugo de León and Adílson Batista as Tricolor captains who lifted the prestigious trophy.

With the 2017 Copa Libertadores title, Grêmio earned a spot in the 2017 FIFA Club World Cup. In the semifinal against Pachuca, Grêmio won 1–0 with a stoppage-time goal by Everton. The final pitted them against Real Madrid, 13-time UEFA Champions League winners, who had qualified after defeating Juventus 4–1 and eliminating Al-Jazira 2–1. Real Madrid fielded their full-strength squad, including players who were regulars for their national teams and the reigning FIFA Ballon d'Or holder, Cristiano Ronaldo. Grêmio were without their Libertadores standout Arthur (due to injury), Cícero (who scored in the first leg of the final), and Cristian due to FIFA transfer regulations. After a resilient first half, led by captain Pedro Geromel, Cristiano Ronaldo scored from a free kick in the 53rd minute. The match ended 1–0 to Real Madrid. Grêmio finished as the second-best club globally in 2017, the only club from Rio Grande do Sul to reach the finals of all official FIFA competitions.

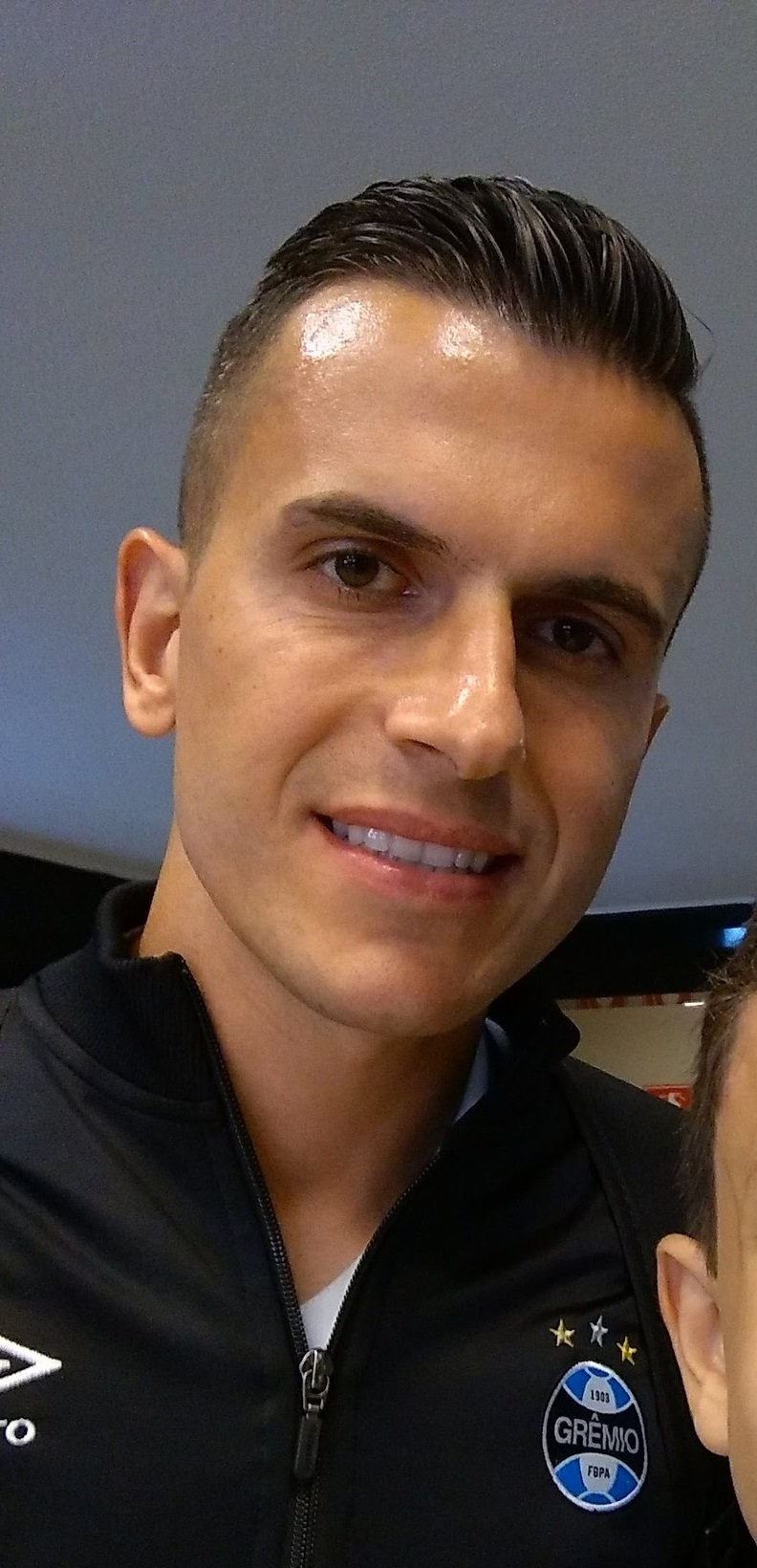
Marcelo Grohe made the "save of the century" against Barcelona S.C. in the first leg of the 2017 Copa Libertadores semifinals, drawing international media attention. He also saved the final penalty to secure the Recopa Sudamericana title.

In 2018, Grêmio won their second Recopa Sudamericana title. Facing the 2017 Copa Sudamericana champions, Independiente (repeating the 1996 Recopa Sudamericana matchup), Grêmio drew both legs (1–1 in Avellaneda and 0–0 in Porto Alegre). With the score level after extra time, the title was decided by penalties. After all five initial kicks were converted, Marcelo Grohe secured the title for Grêmio by saving Martín Benítez's penalty. The 5–4 victory marked Grêmio's third title in just 18 months, establishing dominance in direct finals against the Argentine King of Cups. This was followed by the 2018 Campeonato Gaúcho title, with Grêmio thrashing Brasil de Pelotas 3–0 and 4–0, for a 7–0 aggregate. In the 2018 Copa Libertadores, the last before the single-final format, Grêmio aimed to defend their 2017 title. In a group with Cerro Porteño, Defensor, and Monagas, Grêmio topped Group A with 14 points, conceding only two goals. They faced Estudiantes de La Plata in the round of 16, a familiar foe from 1983. After a 2–1 loss in Quilmes, Grêmio trailed 1–1 at home until Alisson scored in the 47th minute of the second half, forcing penalties, which Grêmio won 5–3. In the quarter-finals, they dominated Atlético Tucumán, winning 2–0 in Argentina and 4–0 in Brazil. In the semifinals, they faced River Plate. After a 1–0 win in Monumental with a goal from Michel, Grêmio lost 2–1 at home in a controversial match marked by the suspended coach Marcelo Gallardo's locker room intrusion and a handball goal by Borré, despite VAR review. Grêmio's board filed a complaint with CONMEBOL. A fourth-place finish in the 2018 Campeonato Brasileiro secured a group stage spot for the next Libertadores.

In 2019, Grêmio won the 2019 Campeonato Gaúcho, defeating Internacional in two 0–0 draws and a 3–2 penalty shootout, with three saves by Paulo Victor. In the 2019 Copa do Brasil, they were eliminated in the quarter-finals by Athletico Paranaense (the eventual champions) on penalties, missing the chance to face Internacional in the semifinals. In the 2019 Copa Libertadores, in a group with Libertad, Universidad Católica, and Rosario Central, Grêmio nearly missed the knockout stage after a draw and two losses. A turnaround came with Jean Pyerre's help, securing a 3–1 home win against Rosario Central, earning him a permanent starting spot. In the round of 16, Grêmio defeated Libertad 5–0 on aggregate. Against Palmeiras in the quarter-finals, after a 1–0 home loss, Grêmio won 2–1 at Pacaembu, their first victory there against Palmeiras, advancing to the semifinals. They failed to reach the final, set for Santiago (later moved to Lima's Estadio Monumental), after a draw in Porto Alegre and a loss in Rio de Janeiro to Flamengo, the eventual champions. A fourth-place finish in the 2019 Campeonato Brasileiro ensured qualification for the 2020 Copa Libertadores, marking their 20th appearance, among Brazil's most frequent participants.

In 2020, Grêmio sold one of their recent stars, Luan, to Corinthians for approximately five million euros. The year was marked by the COVID-19 pandemic in Brazil, halting the 2020 Campeonato Gaúcho in March, resuming in July. The pandemic also paused the Copa Libertadores and delayed the 2020 Campeonato Brasileiro Série A start. In August, Grêmio sold Everton, a key player, to Benfica for an estimated 20 million euros (127.6 million reais at the time), the second most expensive transfer in the history of the club, behind Arthur. In the state championship, Grêmio won the second round, also known as the Taça Francisco Noveletto, securing a final berth against Caxias, the first-round winners. A 2–0 first-leg win with goals from Pepê and Everton, despite a 2–1 loss in the second leg, secured the title.

In the 2020 Copa Libertadores, Grêmio faced rivals Internacional in the group stage for the first time, alongside América de Cali and Universidad Católica. They topped the group, drawing and winning against Internacional. The competition, disrupted by the COVID-19 pandemic, resumed without spectators. After eliminating Guaraní 4–0 on aggregate, Grêmio was knocked out by Santos in the quarter-finals, losing 5–2 on aggregate. The 2020 Campeonato Brasileiro Série A, concluding in 2021, saw Grêmio finish sixth, qualifying for the 2021 Copa Libertadores preliminary round. In the 2020 Copa do Brasil, Grêmio reached the final but lost 3–0 on aggregate to Palmeiras. In women's football, Grêmio reached the quarter-finals of the 2020 Campeonato Brasileiro de Futebol Feminino Série A1, losing to Corinthians, marking their best national campaign. The women's team also finished as runners-up in the Campeonato Gaúcho, losing 2–1 to Internacional in the final.

In 2021, Grêmio were eliminated in the Libertadores preliminary round, before the group stage, losing 4–2 on aggregate to Independiente del Valle. This marked their worst-ever performance in the competition. The following day, coach Renato Portaluppi resigned after four and a half years, having won the 2016 Copa do Brasil, 2017 Copa Libertadores, 2018 Recopa Sudamericana, the 2018, 2019, and 2020 Campeonatos Gaúchos, and the 2019 Recopa Gaúcha.

== 2021–2023 – Campeonato Gaúcho titles, relegation, and Luis Suárez's arrival ==
Throughout 2020, coach Renato Portaluppi's tenure showed signs of strain, with underwhelming performances in the 2020 Campeonato Brasileiro Série A and poor results against Santos in the 2020 Copa Libertadores and Palmeiras in the 2020 Copa do Brasil. A sixth-place finish in the Campeonato Brasileiro forced Grêmio to compete in the Copa Libertadores qualifying stages for the first time since 2013. The 2020 Copa do Brasil finals were played between February 28 and March 7, and the first Copa Libertadores qualifier was played on March 10, leaving Grêmio without a break. In the second Copa Libertadores match, against Independiente del Valle, Grêmio were eliminated, redirecting them to the 2021 Copa Sudamericana. This failure cost Renato Portaluppi his job, and he was replaced by Tiago Nunes.

Under Tiago Nunes, Grêmio advanced in the Copa Sudamericana and won the 2021 Campeonato Gaúcho with ease, defeating their rivals in the final to maintain state dominance. However, during the championship celebration, the club failed to adhere to non-pharmacological COVID-19 pandemic protocols, leading to a COVID-19 outbreak in the squad.

The COVID-19 outbreak contributed to Grêmio's poor start in the 2021 Campeonato Brasileiro Série A, and after nine rounds (with seven games played, as matches against Flamengo and Cuiabá were postponed by the CBF), they earned only two points out of 21, languishing in last place. This led to Tiago Nunes' dismissal, with Luiz Felipe Scolari taking over. The team's performance improved, escaping the bottom spot, but they never left the relegation zone. After a poor run, with fans criticizing Scolari's reliance on underperforming players Alisson and Cortez and his failure to utilize Campaz, a midfielder signed for 3.5 million euros, Scolari was sacked and replaced by Vagner Mancini, known for rescuing teams in dire situations. Mancini retained much of Scolari's squad, including Alisson and Cortez, and the team's performance remained inadequate. Only in the final rounds, after benching these players, did Grêmio improve, with four wins, two draws, and one loss in their last seven games, but it was insufficient, and Grêmio were relegated to the 2022 Campeonato Brasileiro Série B.

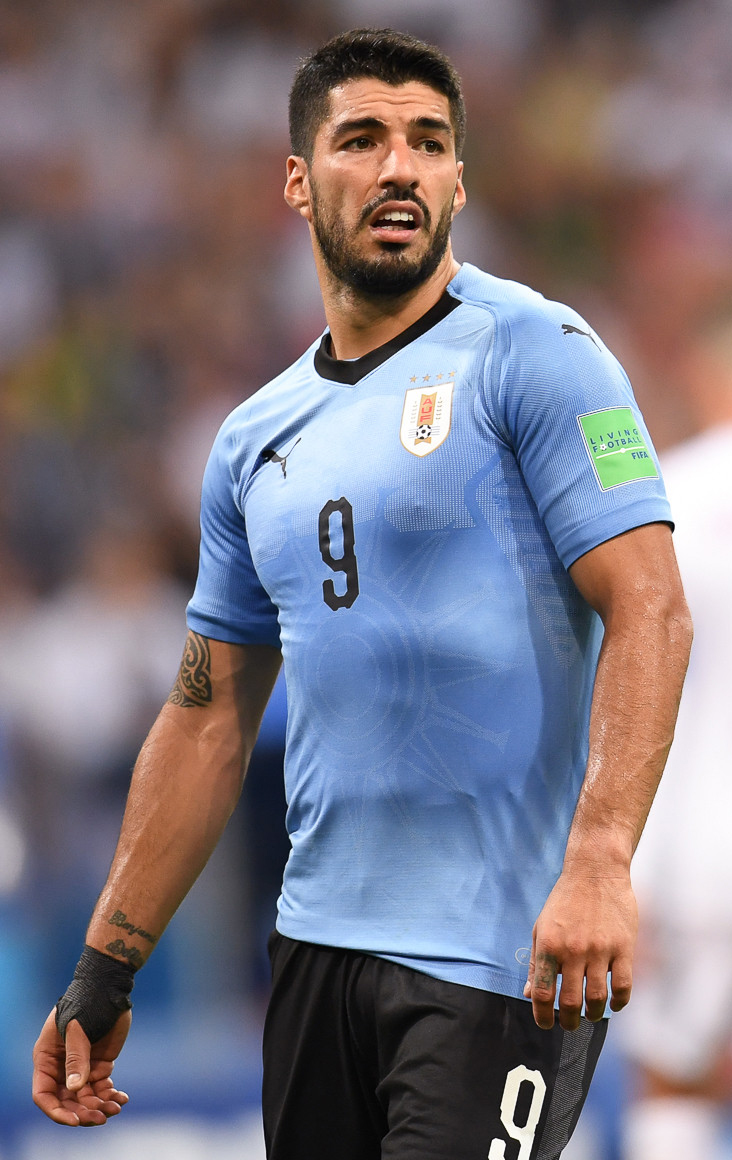
Luis Suárez, named the world's top scorer across 60 major leagues by the IFFHS three times in 2010, 2014, and 2016 (surpassed only by Lionel Messi, his former teammate), joined Grêmio in 2023.

For the 2022 season, Grêmio announced only minor changes to the coaching staff, dismissing technical coordinator Marcelo Oliveira and assistant coach Thiago Gomes. Despite the relegation, coach Vagner Mancini and vice-president of football Dênis Abrahão were retained. After a lackluster 2022 Campeonato Gaúcho, Mancini was sacked and replaced by Roger Machado, who led Grêmio to their fifth consecutive state title, eliminating their rivals in the semifinals and defeating Ypiranga in the final. In the 2022 Copa do Brasil, Grêmio were eliminated in their first match by Mirassol, and in the 2022 Campeonato Brasileiro Série B, with a campaign that lacked flair—despite having a significantly higher payroll compared to their rivals—they secured promotion. However, a late string of poor results led to Roger Machado's dismissal. Renato Portaluppi returned, courted by both presidential candidates. Maintaining Roger's pragmatic style, Renato's Grêmio secured promotion to the 2023 Campeonato Brasileiro Série A. At the end of the year, Alberto Guerra was elected president, succeeding Romildo Bolzan, who served eight years. Bolzan's tenure balanced financial recovery, major title wins, and a return to national and international prominence, but was marred by a third relegation.

In early 2023, to overhaul the squad for the upcoming season, Grêmio made eight signings, including Luis Suárez, one of the decade's top scorers at Barcelona. Alongside Lionel Messi and Neymar, he formed a trio widely praised by international media for their fluid and lethal play. Suárez arrived as a celebrity, with his signing garnering global attention and hailed by journalists as the greatest in Rio Grande do Sul history and among the biggest in Brazilian football.

== Timeline ==
Timeline of Grêmio Foot-Ball Porto Alegrense

- 1903 - Founding of Grêmio Foot-Ball Porto Alegrense
- 1904 - 1–0 victory over Fussball (first match)

Champion of the Wanderpreis Cup (first title)

Inauguration of Estádio da Baixada (first stadium)

- 1905 - Champion of the Wanderpreis Cup
- 1906 - Champion of the Wanderpreis Cup
- 1907 - Champion of the Wanderpreis Cup
- 1909 - Grêmio defeats Internacional 10–0 (first Grenal)

__________________________________________________

- 1910 - Champion of the Wanderpreis Cup
- 1911 - Champion of the Porto Alegre Championship (first title)

Champion of the Wanderpreis Cup

Grêmio defeats Internacional 10–1

- 1912 - Champion of the Porto Alegre Championship

Champion of the Wanderpreis Cup

Grêmio defeats Nacional de São Leopoldo 23–0 (second-largest victory in Brazilian history)

- 1914 - Champion of the Porto Alegre Championship
- 1915 - Champion of the Porto Alegre Championship
- 1916 - Grêmio defeats Uruguay 2–1
- 1919 - Champion of the Porto Alegre Championship

Runner-up in the first Campeonato Gaúcho

__________________________________________________

- 1920 - Champion of the Porto Alegre Championship

First match of Eurico Lara for Grêmio

- 1921 - Champion of the Campeonato Gaúcho (first title)

Champion of the Porto Alegre Championship

- 1922 - Champion of the Campeonato Gaúcho

Champion of the Porto Alegre Championship

- 1923 - Champion of the Porto Alegre Championship
- 1925 - Champion of the Porto Alegre Championship
- 1926 - Champion of the Campeonato Gaúcho

Champion of the Porto Alegre Championship

__________________________________________________

- 1930 - Champion of the Porto Alegre Championship
- 1931 - Champion of the Campeonato Gaúcho

Champion of the Porto Alegre Championship

- 1932 - Champion of the Campeonato Gaúcho

Champion of the Porto Alegre Championship

- 1933 - Champion of the Porto Alegre Championship
- 1935 - Champion of the Porto Alegre Championship

Grêmio wins the Grenal Farroupilha 2–1

Grêmio defeats Santos 3–2 (first match of a Rio Grande do Sul club against a São Paulo club)

- 1936 - Grêmio defeats Oriental 2–0 (first match abroad)
- 1937 - Champion of the Porto Alegre Championship
- 1938 - Champion of the Porto Alegre Championship
- 1939 - Champion of the Porto Alegre Championship

__________________________________________________

- 1940 - Grêmio defeats Independiente 2–1 (first match against an Argentine club)
- 1946 - Champion of the Campeonato Gaúcho

Grêmio adopts the musketeer as its mascot

- 1948 - Champion of the Taça Cidade de Porto Alegre
- 1949 - Champion of the Campeonato Gaúcho

(Uruguay) Champion of the Troféu Sadrep (first international title)

Champion of the Copa El Presidente de la República de Costa Rica

Champion of the Porto Alegre Championship

Undefeated tour in Central America

__________________________________________________

- 1950 - Grêmio defeats Flamengo 3–1 (first victory by a non-Rio de Janeiro team at Maracanã)
- 1953 - Tour in North America
- 1954 - Inauguration of Estádio Olímpico Monumental (second stadium)

(Ecuador) Champion of the Copa José González Artigas

Tour in South America

- 1956 - Champion of the Campeonato Gaúcho

Champion of the Porto Alegre Championship

- 1957 - Champion of the Campeonato Gaúcho

Champion of the Porto Alegre Championship

- 1958 - Champion of the Campeonato Gaúcho

Champion of the Porto Alegre Championship

- 1959 - Champion of the Campeonato Gaúcho

Champion of the Porto Alegre Championship

__________________________________________________

- 1960 - Champion of the Campeonato Gaúcho

Champion of the Porto Alegre Championship

Grêmio defeats Argentina 1–0

- 1961 - (Greece) Champion of the Athens Tournament

First tour in Europe

Grêmio defeats Soviet Union

- 1962 - Champion of the Campeonato Sul-Brasileiro

Champion of the Campeonato Gaúcho

(Greece) Champion of the Thessaloniki Tournament

Second tour in Europe

- 1963 - Champion of the Campeonato Gaúcho

Grêmio updates its emblem and flag

Grêmio hosts the Universiade at Olímpico

- 1964 - Champion of the Campeonato Gaúcho
- 1965 - Champion of the Campeonato Gaúcho
- 1966 - Champion of the Campeonato Gaúcho
- 1967 - Champion of the Campeonato Gaúcho
- 1968 - Champion of the Campeonato Gaúcho (Seven-time champion)

(Uruguay) Champion of the Copa Rio de La Plata

Grêmio creates the world's first supplementary field

__________________________________________________

- 1971 - (Brazil) Champion of the Taça Internacional do Atlântico

(Brazil) Champion of the Torneio Internacional de Porto Alegre

- 1972 - Grêmio plays the first match to be broadcast in color in Brazil
- 1977 - Champion of the Campeonato Gaúcho

Grêmio scores the fastest goal in Grenal history, at 14 seconds

- 1979 - Champion of the Campeonato Gaúcho

(Argentina) Champion of the Torneo Internacional de Rosario

Grêmio plays in the snow against Esportivo

- 1980 - Champion of the Campeonato Gaúcho

Grêmio completes the expansion of Estádio Olímpico Monumental

Grêmio inaugurates CT Hélio Dourado for youth teams

- 1981 - Champion of the Campeonato Brasileiro (first title)

(Spain) Champion of the Trofeo Ciudad de Valladolid

(Uruguay) Champion of the Trofeo Torre del Vigia

Champion of the Copa El Salvador del Mundo

- 1982 - Runner-up in the Campeonato Brasileiro

First match of Renato Gaúcho for Grêmio

- 1983 - Champion of the Intercontinental Cup (first title)

Champion of the Copa Libertadores (first title)

(United States) Champion of the Los Angeles Cup

(El Salvador) Champion of the Trofeo Cell

Grêmio publishes the Battle of La Plata

- 1984 - Runner-up in the Copa Libertadores
- 1985 - Champion of the Campeonato Gaúcho

(Spain) Champion of the Trofeo Ciudad de Palma

(Netherlands) Champion of the Feyenoord Tournament

- 1986 - Champion of the Campeonato Gaúcho

(Netherlands) Champion of the Philips Cup

- 1987 - Champion of the Campeonato Gaúcho

(Switzerland) Champion of the Phillips Cup

- 1988 - Champion of the Campeonato Gaúcho
- 1989 - Champion of the Copa do Brasil (first title)

Champion of the Campeonato Gaúcho

__________________________________________________

- 1990 - Champion of the Supercopa do Brasil

Champion of the Campeonato Gaúcho (Sixth consecutive title)

- 1991 - Runner-up in the Copa do Brasil

19th place in the Campeonato Brasileiro

- 1992 - 9th place in the Campeonato Brasileiro Série B
- 1993 - Champion of the Campeonato Gaúcho

Runner-up in the Copa do Brasil

- 1994 - Champion of the Copa do Brasil (second title)

Grêmio plays three official matches in one day, earning a Guinness record

- 1995 - Champion of the Copa Libertadores (second title)

Champion of the Campeonato Gaúcho

(Japan) Champion of the Sanwa Bank Cup

Runner-up in the Intercontinental Cup

Runner-up in the Copa do Brasil

- 1996 - Champion of the Recopa Sudamericana (first title)

Champion of the Campeonato Brasileiro (second title)

Champion of the Campeonato Gaúcho

(Spain) Champion of the Trofeo Agrupacion Peñas Valencia

(Brazil) Champion of the Copa Internacional Renner

The Grêmio jersey was the world's best-selling sports product in 1996

- 1997 - Champion of the Copa do Brasil (third title)

(Spain) Champion of the Trofeo Colombino

- 1998 - (China) Champion of the Hang Ching Cup

(China) Champion of the New Year Cup

- 1999 - Champion of the Copa Sul

Champion of the Campeonato Gaúcho

__________________________________________________

- 2001 - Champion of the Copa do Brasil (fourth title)

Champion of the Campeonato Gaúcho

- 2003 - CBF creates the CBF ranking, and Grêmio leads it
- 2004 - 24th place in the Campeonato Brasileiro
- 2005 - Champion of the Campeonato Brasileiro Série B (first title)

Grêmio's shirt voted the most beautiful in the world by Monet magazine

Grêmio publishes the Batalha dos Aflitos

- 2006 - Champion of the Campeonato Gaúcho

Champion of the Copa FGF

- 2007 - Champion of the Campeonato Gaúcho

Runner-up in the Copa Libertadores

- 2008 - (Brazil) Champion of the Troféu Osmar Santos

Runner-up in the Campeonato Brasileiro

- 2009 - Grêmio defeats Internacional 2–1 (Centenary derby)

Grêmio finishes the Campeonato Brasileiro undefeated at home

__________________________________________________

- 2010 - Champion of the Campeonato Gaúcho

(Brazil) Champion of the Troféu João Saldanha

Champion of the Taça Fernando Carvalho

(Uruguay) Champion of the Copa Frontera de la Paz

Grêmio begins construction of the Arena

CBF unifies the Campeonato Brasileiro, and Grêmio has the most participations

- 2011 - Champion of the Taça Piratini

Grêmio defeats Internacional 2–1 in Rivera, URU (first Grenal abroad)

- 2012 - Inauguration of Arena do Grêmio (third stadium)

Grêmio begins construction of CT Luiz Carvalho on the banks of Guaíba

- 2013 - Runner-up in the Campeonato Brasileiro Série A

CBF updates the Club Ranking, and Grêmio leads with 15,286 points

- 2014 - First Grenal won by Grêmio at Arena do Grêmio, 4–1
- 2015 - Grêmio wins Grenal 407 5–0 at Arena do Grêmio (largest victory in the 21st century in the derby)
- 2016 - Champion of the Copa do Brasil (fifth title)

CBF updates the Club Ranking, and Grêmio leads with 15,038 points in 2017

- 2017 - Champion of the Copa Libertadores (third title)

Runner-up in the 2017 FIFA Club World Cup

The club with the most members in Brazil, with more than 130,000 members

- 2018 - Champion of the Recopa Sudamericana (second title)

Champion of the Campeonato Gaúcho

- 2019 - Champion of the Recopa Gaúcha (first title)

Champion of the Campeonato Gaúcho

__________________________________________________

- 2020 - Champion of the Campeonato Gaúcho
- 2021 - Champion of the Campeonato Gaúcho

Champion of the Recopa Gaúcha (second title)

17th place in the Campeonato Brasileiro

- 2022 - Champion of the Campeonato Gaúcho

Champion of the Recopa Gaúcha (third title)

2nd place in the Campeonato Brasileiro Série B

- 2023 - Champion of the Recopa Gaúcha (fourth title)

Champion of the Campeonato Gaúcho

- 2024 - Champion of the Campeonato Gaúcho

== Historical facts of Grêmio ==
- The first football match played by Grêmio was in 1903 against Fussball Club Porto Alegre, with the Tricolor securing a 1–0 victory.
- Grêmio defeated Sport Club Nacional of Porto Alegre 23–0 on August 25, 1912. In this match, striker Sisson scored fourteen goals, setting another club record.
- Contrary to popular belief and persistent claims, Osmar Fortes Barcellos, known as "Tesourinha," was not the first black athlete to wear Grêmio's jersey. He was, however, the first prominent black player in the professional era in 1952. Before him, players such as Antunes (1913/14), Adão (1926/35), Laxixa (1937/40), Mário Carioca, Hélio, Prego (1940s), and Hermes (1948/50) shone for Grêmio.
- On September 17, 1916, Grêmio defeated the Uruguay national team 2–1 at Estádio da Baixada.
- The phrase "Com o Grêmio onde o Grêmio estiver" ("With Grêmio wherever Grêmio may be") was coined by the late supporter Salim Nigrii in 1946. One of Grêmio's most devoted fans, who was visually impaired, kept a plaque at his home, awarded by the club in recognition of authoring the famous phrase incorporated into the club's anthem.
- In 1950, Grêmio traveled to Rio de Janeiro to play at the Maracanã, becoming the first non-Rio de Janeiro team to play in the stadium. They left their mark by defeating Flamengo 3–1.
- At 3:00 p.m. on September 19, 1954, the inauguration parade for the Estádio Olímpico began. The stadium was named "Olímpico" because it was designed to host all Olympic sports. It was the largest privately owned stadium in Brazil at the time. The inaugural match followed, with Grêmio defeating Nacional 2–0.
- On February 25, 1959, Grêmio demonstrated its strength by defeating Boca Juniors 4–1 at the iconic La Bombonera stadium in Buenos Aires. Gessy Lima was the standout, scoring all four goals for the Tricolor, marking the first victory by a foreign club against Boca Juniors at La Bombonera.
- In 1963, the world's largest university Olympic event, the Summer Universiade, was held for the first time in South America, in Porto Alegre, at the Estádio Olímpico Monumental.
- In 1971, Grêmio F.B.P.A. built the Pórtico dos Campeões (Champions' Gateway) at the Estádio Olímpico to commemorate the Brazilian national team's third World Cup title, which included Everaldo, the only player from Rio Grande do Sul selected for the 1970 World Cup.
- Nestor Scotta, a former Argentine player for Grêmio, scored the first goal in the history of the Campeonato Brasileiro, in Grêmio's 3–0 victory over São Paulo on August 7, 1971, at the Morumbi stadium.
- The first football match broadcast in color in Brazil was Grêmio vs. SER Caxias, in 1972, aired by TV Difusora.
- In 1977, Yúra scored the fastest goal in the history of Grenal matches, just 14 seconds into the game. Internacional did not even touch the ball. Grêmio won the match 2–1.
- The Tricolor played in the snow in Bento Gonçalves against Esportivo on May 30, 1979, in a match famously known as the Snow Game.
- Grêmio played three official matches in a single day on December 11, 1994, all part of that year's Campeonato Gaúcho. The matches were: Grêmio 0–0 Aimoré, Grêmio 4–3 Santa Cruz, and Grêmio 1–0 Brasil de Pelotas.
- Grêmio is the second-most successful club in the Copa do Brasil with five titles, trailing only Cruzeiro with six titles.
- Grêmio contributed three players to the Brazilian national team that won World Cups. In 1970, Everaldo was part of the third title-winning squad, and in 2002, Ânderson Polga and Luizão were part of the fifth title-winning team.
- Sebastián Saja became the first goalkeeper to score a goal for Grêmio in an official competition. This feat took place on November 3, 2007, during a Campeonato Brasileiro match against Figueirense, at the Estádio Olímpico Monumental. Prior to this, goalkeeper Nélson was the first in his position to score a goal, in a friendly match against 24 de Maio, during the inauguration of the club's stadium in Itaqui.
- Grêmio was the first club in the history of the Campeonato Brasileiro, under the points system, to finish the competition undefeated at home. This achievement occurred from January 1 to December 31, 2009.
- Grêmio holds the record for the most participations by a Brazilian club in the Copa Libertadores, with 20 appearances, alongside São Paulo and Palmeiras.
- Grêmio was ranked among the three most valuable clubs in the Americas according to Forbes magazine.

== See also ==
- 2025 Grêmio FBPA season
