= Wanderpreis Cup =

Football

The Wanderpreis Cup was a cup contested by Grêmio and Fussball Club Porto Alegre. The cup was sponsored by Banco Alemão, a Brazilian bank. It was granted to the club which won three consecutive matches. Grêmio FBPA was the only club to win the Wanderpreis Cup three consecutive times.

== List of matches ==
=== First Wanderpreis ===
The first edition of the Wanderpreis Cup was biannual.

Match	Date	Champion	Score	Runner-up
1	6 March 1904	Grêmio	1–0	Fussball Club Porto Alegre
2	25 September 1904	Fussball Club Porto Alegre	2–1	Grêmio
3	12 March 1905	Grêmio	4–0	Fussball Club Porto Alegre
4	10 September 1905	Grêmio	2–0	Fussball Club Porto Alegre
5	18 March 1906	Grêmio	1–1	Fussball Club Porto Alegre
6	5 May 1906	Grêmio	3–1	Fussball Club Porto Alegre

Total

- Grêmio FBPA: 4 wons
- Fussball Club Porto Alegre: 1 won

Grêmio takes permanent possession of the first Wanderpreis Cup.

=== Second Wanderpreis ===
The second edition of the Wanderpreis Cup was annual. Even with the creation of the Liga Porto-Alegrense de Foot-Ball (LPAF) in 1910, the tournament was played until 1912.

Match	Date	Champion	Score	Runner-up
1	1 December 1907	Grêmio	4–1	Fussball Club Porto Alegre
2	27 September 1908	Fussball Club Porto Alegre	1–0	Grêmio
3	3 October 1909	Fussball Club Porto Alegre	1–0	Grêmio
4	29 September 1910	Grêmio	5–0	Fussball Club Porto Alegre
5	23 October 1911	Grêmio	1–0	Fussball Club Porto Alegre
6	6 October 1912	Grêmio	5–0	Fussball Club Porto Alegre

Total

- Grêmio FBPA: 4 wons
- Fussball Club Porto Alegre: 2 wons

Grêmio takes permanent possession of the second Wanderpreis Cup.

== See also ==
- Campeonato Citadino de Porto Alegre
