= Eurico Lara =

Brazilian footballer (1897–1935)

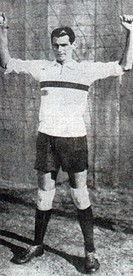

Personal information
- Date of birth: 24 January 1897
- Place of birth: Uruguaiana, Brazil
- Date of death: 6 November 1935 (aged 38)
- Place of death: Porto Alegre, Brazil
- Position: Goalkeeper

Senior career*
Years	Team	Apps	(Gls)
1920–1935	Grêmio		
- * Club domestic league appearances and goals

Eurico Lara (24 January 1897 – 6 November 1935), was a Brazilian footballer.

== Biography ==
He was born in Uruguaiana. Eurico Lara played for Grêmio Foot-Ball Porto Alegrense from 1920 to 1935. He played his last match on 23 September 1935, when his club defeated Internacional 2–0. Due to cardiac problems, he was substituted during half-time, dying approximately two months later in Porto Alegre. According to legend, he died during that match, after defending a penalty shot by his brother. He is mentioned in Grêmio's anthem.
