= 2020 Copa do Brasil final rounds =

The 2020 Copa do Brasil final rounds were the final rounds (round of 16, quarter-finals, semi-finals and finals) of the 2020 Copa do Brasil football competition. They were played from 14 October 2020 to 7 March 2021. A total of 16 teams competed in the final rounds to decide the champions of the 2020 Copa do Brasil.

== Format ==
In the final rounds, each tie was played on a home-and-away two-legged basis. If the aggregate score was level, the second-leg match would go straight to the penalty shoot-out to determine the winners.

== Bracket ==
Round of 16
(Rio de Janeiro (state)) Botafogo	0	0	0
(Mato Grosso) Cuiabá	1	0	1
(Rio Grande do Sul) Grêmio	1	1	2
(Rio Grande do Sul) Juventude	0	0	0
(Paraná (state)) Athletico Paranaense	0	2	2
(Rio de Janeiro (state)) Flamengo	1	3	4
(Ceará) Fortaleza	3	2	5 (9)
(São Paulo (state)) São Paulo (p)	3	2	5 (10)
(São Paulo (state)) Red Bull Bragantino	1	0	1
(São Paulo (state)) Palmeiras	3	1	4
(São Paulo (state)) Santos	0	0	0
Ceará	0	1	1
(Goiás) Atlético Goianiense	1	1	2
(Rio Grande do Sul) Internacional	2	2	4
(São Paulo (state)) Corinthians	0	1	1
(Minas Gerais) América Mineiro	1	1	2

Quarter-finals
(Mato Grosso) Cuiabá	1	0	1
(Rio Grande do Sul) Grêmio	2	2	4
(Rio de Janeiro (state)) Flamengo	1	0	1
(São Paulo (state)) São Paulo	2	3	5
(São Paulo (state)) Palmeiras	3	2	5
Ceará	0	2	2
(Rio Grande do Sul) Internacional	0	1	1 (5)
(Minas Gerais) América Mineiro (p)	1	0	1 (6)

Semi-finals
(Rio Grande do Sul) Grêmio	1	0	1
(São Paulo (state)) São Paulo	0	0	0
(São Paulo (state)) Palmeiras	1	2	3
(Minas Gerais) América Mineiro	1	0	1

Finals
(Rio Grande do Sul) Grêmio	0	0	0
(São Paulo (state)) Palmeiras	1	2	3

== Round of 16 ==
=== Draw ===
The draw for the round of 16 was held on 1 October 2020, 11:30 at CBF headquarters in Rio de Janeiro. The 16 qualified teams were drawn in a single group (CBF ranking shown in parentheses).

Group
(São Paulo (state)) Palmeiras (1); (Rio de Janeiro (state)) Flamengo (2); (Rio Grande do Sul) Grêmio (3); (São Paulo (state)) Santos (5); (Paraná (state)) Athletico Paranaense (6); (São Paulo (state)) Corinthians (8); (Rio Grande do Sul) Internacional (9); (São Paulo (state)) São Paulo (11)	(Rio de Janeiro (state)) Botafogo (14); (Minas Gerais) América Mineiro (18); Ceará (19); (Ceará) Fortaleza (23); (Goiás) Atlético Goianiense (25); (Rio Grande do Sul) Juventude (29); (São Paulo (state)) Red Bull Bragantino (37); (Mato Grosso) Cuiabá (43)

=== Matches ===
The first legs were played on 14 and 27–29 October and the second legs were played on 25 October and 3–5 November 2020.

Team 1	Agg.	Team 2	1st leg	2nd leg
Fortaleza (Ceará)	5–5 (9–10 p)	(São Paulo (state)) São Paulo	3–3	2–2
Santos (São Paulo (state))	0–1	Ceará	0–0	0–1
Grêmio (Rio Grande do Sul)	2–0	(Rio Grande do Sul) Juventude	1–0	1–0
Atlético Goianiense (Goiás)	2–4	(Rio Grande do Sul) Internacional	1–2	1–2
Botafogo (Rio de Janeiro (state))	0–1	(Mato Grosso) Cuiabá	0–1	0–0
Athletico Paranaense (Paraná (state))	2–4	(Rio de Janeiro (state)) Flamengo	0–1	2–3
Red Bull Bragantino (São Paulo (state))	1–4	(São Paulo (state)) Palmeiras	1–3	0–1
Corinthians (São Paulo (state))	1–2	(Minas Gerais) América Mineiro	0–1	1–1

All times are Brasília time, BRT (UTC−3)

=== Match 76 ===
14 October 2020
19:15

Fortaleza (Ceará)	3–3	(São Paulo (state)) São Paulo
David 5'; Tinga 20'; Gabriel Dias 65'	Report	Brenner 16', 90+4'; Luciano 44'

Castelão, Fortaleza
Attendance: 0
Referee: Rodolpho Toski Marques (Paraná)

25 October 2020
20:30

São Paulo (São Paulo (state))	2–2	(Ceará) Fortaleza
Brenner 10', 71'	Report	David 80'; Roger Carvalho 90+2'
Penalties
Reinaldo (penalty scored); Tchê Tchê (penalty scored); Dani Alves (penalty scored); Pablo (penalty scored); Vitor Bueno (penalty scored); Tiago Volpi (penalty scored); Bruno Alves (penalty scored); Arboleda (penalty scored); Diego (penalty scored); Léo (penalty scored)	10–9	(penalty scored) Juninho; (penalty scored) Wellington Paulista; (penalty scored) Bruno Melo; (penalty scored) Marlon; (penalty scored) Max Walef; (penalty scored) Yuri César; (penalty scored) Paulão; (penalty scored) Osvaldo; (penalty scored) Roger Carvalho; (penalty missed) Gabriel Dias

Estádio do Morumbi, São Paulo
Attendance: 0
Referee: Leandro Vuaden (Rio Grande do Sul)

Tied 5–5 on aggregate, São Paulo won on penalties and advanced to the quarter-finals.

=== Match 77 ===
28 October 2020
16:00

Santos (São Paulo (state))	0–0	Ceará
	Report

Estádio Urbano Caldeira, Santos
Attendance: 0
Referee: Wagner do Nascimento Magalhães (Rio de Janeiro)

4 November 2020
19:00

Ceará	1–0	(São Paulo (state)) Santos
Vinícius 70'	Report

Castelão, Fortaleza
Attendance: 0
Referee: Leandro Vuaden (Rio Grande do Sul)

Ceará won 1–0 on aggregate and advanced to the quarter-finals.

=== Match 78 ===
29 October 2020
21:30

Grêmio (Rio Grande do Sul)	1–0	(Rio Grande do Sul) Juventude
Isaque 8'	Report

Arena do Grêmio, Porto Alegre
Attendance: 0
Referee: Anderson Daronco (Rio Grande do Sul)

5 November 2020
21:30

Juventude (Rio Grande do Sul)	0–1	(Rio Grande do Sul) Grêmio
	Report	Thaciano 69'

Estádio Alfredo Jaconi, Caxias do Sul
Attendance: 0
Referee: Marcelo de Lima Henrique (Rio de Janeiro)

Grêmio won 2–0 on aggregate and advanced to the quarter-finals.

=== Match 79 ===
28 October 2020
19:00

Atlético Goianiense (Goiás)	1–2	(Rio Grande do Sul) Internacional
Jean 90+1' (pen.)	Report	Fernández 12'; Moisés 60'

Estádio Olímpico Pedro Ludovico, Goiânia
Attendance: 0
Referee: Marcelo de Lima Henrique (Rio de Janeiro)

3 November 2020
21:30

Internacional (Rio Grande do Sul)	2–1	(Goiás) Atlético Goianiense
Thiago Galhardo 54'; Rodinei 76'	Report	Júnior Brandão 85'

Estádio Beira-Rio, Porto Alegre
Attendance: 0
Referee: Felipe Fernandes de Lima (Minas Gerais)

Internacional won 4–2 on aggregate and advanced to the quarter-finals.

=== Match 80 ===
27 October 2020
21:30

Botafogo (Rio de Janeiro (state))	0–1	(Mato Grosso) Cuiabá
	Report	Matheus Barbosa 54'

Estádio Olímpico Nilton Santos, Rio de Janeiro
Attendance: 0
Referee: Gilberto Rodrigues Castro Júnior (Pernambuco)

3 November 2020
19:00

Cuiabá (Mato Grosso)	0–0	(Rio de Janeiro (state)) Botafogo
	Report

Arena Pantanal, Cuiabá
Attendance: 0
Referee: Ricardo Marques (Minas Gerais)

Cuiabá won 1–0 on aggregate and advanced to the quarter-finals.

=== Match 81 ===
28 October 2020
21:30

Athletico Paranaense (Paraná (state))	0–1	(Rio de Janeiro (state)) Flamengo
	Report	Bruno Henrique 20'

Arena da Baixada, Curitiba
Attendance: 0
Referee: Ricardo Marques (Minas Gerais)

4 November 2020
21:30

Flamengo (Rio de Janeiro (state))	3–2	(Paraná (state)) Athletico Paranaense
Pedro 24', 33'; Michael 83'	Report	Erick 40'; Bissoli 87'

Maracanã, Rio de Janeiro
Attendance: 0
Referee: Rodrigo D'Alonso Ferreira (Santa Catarina)

Flamengo won 4–2 on aggregate and advanced to the quarter-finals.

=== Match 82 ===
29 October 2020
19:00

Red Bull Bragantino (São Paulo (state))	1–3	(São Paulo (state)) Palmeiras
Hurtado 82'	Report	Raphael Veiga 5'; Wesley 18'; Luiz Adriano 27'

Estádio Nabi Abi Chedid, Bragança Paulista
Attendance: 0
Referee: Jean Pierre Gonçalves Lima (Rio Grande do Sul)

5 November 2020
19:00

Palmeiras (São Paulo (state))	1–0	(São Paulo (state)) Red Bull Bragantino
Gabriel Veron 29'	Report

Allianz Parque, São Paulo
Attendance: 0
Referee: Vinícius Gonçalves Dias Araújo (São Paulo)

Palmeiras won 4–1 on aggregate and advanced to the quarter-finals.

=== Match 83 ===
28 October 2020
21:30

Corinthians (São Paulo (state))	0–1	(Minas Gerais) América Mineiro
	Report	Marcelo Toscano 88'

Neo Química Arena, São Paulo
Attendance: 0
Referee: Rodrigo D'Alonso Ferreira (Santa Catarina)

4 November 2020
21:30

América Mineiro (Minas Gerais)	1–1	(São Paulo (state)) Corinthians
Rodolfo 83' (pen.)	Report	Fagner 59' (pen.)

Estádio Independência, Belo Horizonte
Attendance: 0
Referee: Wagner do Nascimento Magalhães (Rio de Janeiro)

América Mineiro won 2–1 on aggregate and advanced to the quarter-finals.

== Quarter-finals ==
=== Draw ===
The draw for the quarter-finals was held on 6 November 2020, 11:30 at CBF headquarters in Rio de Janeiro. All teams were placed into a single group (CBF ranking shown in parentheses).

Group
- (São Paulo (state)) Palmeiras (1)
- (Rio de Janeiro (state)) Flamengo (2)
- (Rio Grande do Sul) Grêmio (3)
- (Rio Grande do Sul) Internacional (9)
- (São Paulo (state)) São Paulo (11)
- (Minas Gerais) América Mineiro (18)
- Ceará (19)
- (Mato Grosso) Cuiabá (43)

=== Matches ===
The first legs were played on 11 November and the second legs were played on 18 November 2020.

Team 1	Agg.	Team 2	1st leg	2nd leg
Flamengo (Rio de Janeiro (state))	1–5	(São Paulo (state)) São Paulo	1–2	0–3
Cuiabá (Mato Grosso)	1–4	(Rio Grande do Sul) Grêmio	1–2	0–2
Internacional (Rio Grande do Sul)	1–1 (5–6 p)	(Minas Gerais) América Mineiro	0–1	1–0
Palmeiras (São Paulo (state))	5–2	Ceará	3–0	2–2

All times are Brasília time, BRT (UTC−3)

=== Match 84 ===
11 November 2020
21:30

Flamengo (Rio de Janeiro (state))	1–2	(São Paulo (state)) São Paulo
Gabriel 48'	Report	Brenner 46', 87'

Maracanã, Rio de Janeiro
Attendance: 0
Referee: Anderson Daronco (Rio Grande do Sul)

18 November 2020
21:30

São Paulo (São Paulo (state))	3–0	(Rio de Janeiro (state)) Flamengo
Luciano 46', 55'; Pablo 84'	Report

Estádio do Morumbi, São Paulo
Attendance: 0
Referee: Wilton Sampaio (Goiás)

São Paulo won 5–1 on aggregate and advanced to the semi-finals.

=== Match 85 ===
11 November 2020
19:00

Cuiabá (Mato Grosso)	1–2	(Rio Grande do Sul) Grêmio
Willians Santana 19'	Report	Diego Souza 7'; Jean Pyerre 43' (pen.)

Arena Pantanal, Cuiabá
Attendance: 0
Referee: Vinícius Gonçalves Dias Araújo (São Paulo)

18 November 2020
16:30

Grêmio (Rio Grande do Sul)	2–0	(Mato Grosso) Cuiabá
Diego Souza 9', 41'	Report

Arena do Grêmio, Porto Alegre
Attendance: 0
Referee: Felipe Fernandes de Lima (Minas Gerais)

Grêmio won 4–1 on aggregate and advanced to the semi-finals.

=== Match 86 ===
11 November 2020
21:30

Internacional (Rio Grande do Sul)	0–1	(Minas Gerais) América Mineiro
	Report	Rodolfo 12'

Estádio Beira-Rio, Porto Alegre
Attendance: 0
Referee: Caio Max Augusto Vieira (Rio Grande do Norte)

18 November 2020
21:30

América Mineiro (Minas Gerais)	0–1	(Rio Grande do Sul) Internacional
	Report	Yuri Alberto 90+4'
Penalties
Léo Passos (penalty scored); Messias (penalty scored); Daniel Borges (penalty missed); Sabino (penalty scored); Marcelo Toscano (penalty scored); João Paulo (penalty scored); Juninho (penalty scored)	6–5	(penalty missed) Thiago Galhardo; (penalty scored) Rodrigo Lindoso; (penalty scored) Edenílson; (penalty scored) Yuri Alberto; (penalty scored) Rodinei; (penalty scored) Praxedes; (penalty missed) Uendel

Estádio Independência, Belo Horizonte
Attendance: 0
Referee: Vinícius Gonçalves Dias Araújo (São Paulo)

Tied 1–1 on aggregate, América Mineiro won on penalties and advanced to the semi-finals.

=== Match 87 ===
11 November 2020
16:30

Palmeiras (São Paulo (state))	3–0	Ceará
Gustavo Scarpa 34'; Raphael Veiga 37'; Gabriel Veron 39'	Report

Allianz Parque, São Paulo
Attendance: 0
Referee: Bráulio da Silva Machado (Santa Catarina)

18 November 2020
19:00

Ceará	2–2	(São Paulo (state)) Palmeiras
Vinícius 57'; Tiago 61'	Report	Raphael Veiga 27' (pen.), 45+4'

Castelão, Fortaleza
Attendance: 0
Referee: Paulo Roberto Alves Júnior (Paraná)

Palmeiras won 5–2 on aggregate and advanced to the semi-finals.

== Semi-finals ==
=== Draw ===
The draw to determine the home-and-away teams for both legs were held on 24 November 2020, 15:00 at CBF headquarters in Rio de Janeiro.

=== Matches ===
The first legs were played on 23 December and the second legs were played on 30 December 2020.

Team 1	Agg.	Team 2	1st leg	2nd leg
Grêmio (Rio Grande do Sul)	1–0	(São Paulo (state)) São Paulo	1–0	0–0
Palmeiras (São Paulo (state))	3–1	(Minas Gerais) América Mineiro	1–1	2–0

All times are Brasília time, BRT (UTC−3)

=== Match 88 ===
23 December 2020
21:30

Grêmio (Rio Grande do Sul)	1–0	(São Paulo (state)) São Paulo
Diego Souza 62'	Report

Arena do Grêmio, Porto Alegre
Attendance: 0
Referee: Marcelo de Lima Henrique (Rio de Janeiro)

30 December 2020
21:30

São Paulo (São Paulo (state))	0–0	(Rio Grande do Sul) Grêmio
	Report

Estádio do Morumbi, São Paulo
Attendance: 0
Referee: Bruno Arleu de Araújo (Rio de Janeiro)

Grêmio won 1–0 on aggregate and advanced to the finals.

=== Match 89 ===
23 December 2020
21:30

Palmeiras (São Paulo (state))	1–1	(Minas Gerais) América Mineiro
Gómez 45+3'	Report	Ademir 19'

Allianz Parque, São Paulo
Attendance: 0
Referee: Leandro Vuaden (Rio Grande do Sul)

30 December 2020
21:30

América Mineiro (Minas Gerais)	0–2	(São Paulo (state)) Palmeiras
	Report	Luiz Adriano 68'; Rony 85'

Estádio Independência, Belo Horizonte
Attendance: 0
Referee: Wilton Sampaio (Goiás)

Palmeiras won 3–1 on aggregate and advanced to the finals.

== Finals ==
=== Draw ===
The draw to determine the home-and-away teams for both legs was held on 14 January 2021, 11:30 at CBF headquarters in Rio de Janeiro.

=== Matches ===
The first leg was played on 28 February and the second leg was played on 7 March 2021.

Team 1	Agg.	Team 2	1st leg	2nd leg
Grêmio (Rio Grande do Sul)	0–3	(São Paulo (state)) Palmeiras	0–1	0–2

All times are Brasília time, BRT (UTC−3)

=== Match 90 ===
28 February 2021
21:00

Grêmio (Rio Grande do Sul)	0–1	(São Paulo (state)) Palmeiras
	Report	Gómez 31'

Arena do Grêmio, Porto Alegre
Attendance: 0
Referee: Marcelo de Lima Henrique (Rio de Janeiro)

7 March 2021
18:00

Palmeiras (São Paulo (state))	2–0	(Rio Grande do Sul) Grêmio
Wesley 53'; Gabriel Menino 84'	Report

Allianz Parque, São Paulo
Attendance: 0
Referee: Bruno Arleu de Araújo (Rio de Janeiro)
