= 2020 Copa do Brasil finals =

2020 Copa do Brasil Finals
| Grêmio | Palmeiras |
| (Rio Grande do Sul) | (São Paulo (state)) |
| 0 | 3 |
- on aggregate

First leg
| Grêmio | Palmeiras |
| 0 | 1 |
- Date: 28 February 2021
- Venue: Arena do Grêmio, Porto Alegre
- Man of the Match: Gustavo Gómez (Palmeiras)
- Referee: Marcelo de Lima Henrique (Rio de Janeiro)
- Attendance: 0

Second leg
| Palmeiras | Grêmio |
| 2 | 0 |
- Date: 7 March 2021
- Venue: Allianz Parque, São Paulo
- Man of the Match: Wesley (Palmeiras)
- Referee: Bruno Arleu de Araújo (Rio de Janeiro)
- Attendance: 0

The 2020 Copa do Brasil Finals was the final two-legged tie that decided the 2020 Copa do Brasil, the 32nd season of the Copa do Brasil, Brazil's national cup football tournament organised by the Brazilian Football Confederation.

The finals were contested in a two-legged home-and-away format between Grêmio, from Rio Grande do Sul, and Palmeiras, from São Paulo. Grêmio and Palmeiras reached the Copa do Brasil finals for the ninth and fifth time, respectively.

A draw by CBF was held on 14 January 2021 to determine the home-and-away teams for each leg. The finals were originally scheduled to be played on 11 and 17 February 2021, however due to the participation of Palmeiras in the 2020 FIFA Club World Cup the finals were rescheduled. The first leg was hosted by Grêmio at Arena do Grêmio in Porto Alegre on 28 February 2021, while the second leg was hosted by Palmeiras at Allianz Parque in São Paulo on 7 March 2021.

Palmeiras defeated Grêmio 3–0 on aggregate in the finals to win their fourth title. As champions, Palmeiras earned the right to play in the 2021 Supercopa do Brasil against the 2020 Campeonato Brasileiro Série A champions. Palmeiras had already qualified for the 2021 Copa Libertadores group stage and the 2021 Copa do Brasil third round by winning the 2020 Copa Libertadores.

== Teams ==
| Team | Previous finals appearances (bold indicates winners) |
|---|---|
| (Rio Grande do Sul) Grêmio | 8 (**1989**, 1991, 1993, **1994**, 1995, **1997**, **2001**, **2016**) |
| (São Paulo (state)) Palmeiras | 4 (1996, **1998**, **2012**, **2015**) |

=== Road to the final ===
Note: In all scores below, the score of the home team is given first.

| (Rio Grande do Sul) Grêmio | | | Round | (São Paulo (state)) Palmeiras | | |
|---|---|---|---|---|---|---|
| Opponent | Venue | Score | | Opponent | Venue | Score |
| (Rio Grande do Sul) Juventude (won 2–0 on aggregate) | Home | 1–0 | Round of 16 | (São Paulo (state)) Red Bull Bragantino (won 4–1 on aggregate) | Away | 1–3 |
| (Rio Grande do Sul) Juventude (won 2–0 on aggregate) | Away | 0–1 | Round of 16 | (São Paulo (state)) Red Bull Bragantino (won 4–1 on aggregate) | Home | 1–0 |
| (Mato Grosso) Cuiabá (won 4–1 on aggregate) | Away | 1–2 | Quarter-finals | Ceará (won 5–2 on aggregate) | Home | 3–0 |
| (Mato Grosso) Cuiabá (won 4–1 on aggregate) | Home | 2–0 | Quarter-finals | Ceará (won 5–2 on aggregate) | Away | 2–2 |
| (São Paulo (state)) São Paulo (won 1–0 on aggregate) | Home | 1–0 | Semi-finals | (Minas Gerais) América Mineiro (won 3–1 on aggregate) | Home | 1–1 |
| (São Paulo (state)) São Paulo (won 1–0 on aggregate) | Away | 0–0 | Semi-finals | (Minas Gerais) América Mineiro (won 3–1 on aggregate) | Away | 0–2 |

== Format ==
In the finals, the teams played a single-elimination tournament with the following rules:

- The finals were played on a home-and-away two-legged basis. The home-and-away teams for both legs were determined by a draw held on 14 January 2021 at the CBF headquarters in Rio de Janeiro, Brazil.
- If tied on aggregate, the away goals rule and extra time would not be used and the penalty shoot-out would be used to determine the winners. (Regulations Article 20).

== Matches ==
Pedro Geromel and Leonardo Gomes (Grêmio) and Luan Silva and Emerson Santos (Palmeiras) were ruled out of the finals due to injuries. Patrick de Paula (Palmeiras) was ruled out of the first leg after testing COVID-19 positive.

=== First leg ===
28 February 2021
21:00 UTC−3

| Grêmio (Rio Grande do Sul) | 0–1 | (São Paulo (state)) Palmeiras |
|---|---|---|
| | Report | Gómez 31' |

Arena do Grêmio, Porto Alegre
Attendance: 0
Referee: Marcelo de Lima Henrique (Rio de Janeiro)

| **Grêmio** | **Palmeiras** |

| GK | 1 | (Brazil) Paulo Victor |
| RB | 2 | (Brazil) Victor Ferraz | | (substituted off) 73' |
| CB | 28 | (Brazil) Paulo Miranda | | (substituted off) 81' |
| CB | 4 | (Argentina) Walter Kannemann | (yellow card) 87' |
| LB | 32 | (Brazil) Diogo Barbosa | (yellow card) 53' |
| RM | 8 | (Brazil) Maicon (c) | | (substituted off) 73' |
| LM | 7 | (Brazil) Matheus Henrique |
| AM | 10 | (Brazil) Jean Pyerre | | (substituted off) 81' |
| RW | 25 | (Brazil) Pepê |
| CF | 29 | (Brazil) Diego Souza |
| LW | 23 | (Brazil) Alisson | | (substituted off) 81' |
Substitutes:
| GK | 27 | (Brazil) Vanderlei |
| DF | 12 | (Brazil) Bruno Cortez |
| DF | 14 | (Brazil) David Braz |
| DF | 35 | (Brazil) Vanderson | (yellow card) 90+2' | (substituted on) 81' |
| DF | 38 | (Brazil) Rodrigues |
| MF | 15 | (Brazil) Darlan |
| MF | 16 | (Brazil) Lucas Silva |
| MF | 20 | (Brazil) Thaciano | | (substituted on) 81' |
| MF | 46 | (Brazil) Isaque | | (substituted on) 81' |
| FW | 19 | (Argentina) Diego Churín | | (substituted on) 73' |
| FW | 47 | (Brazil) Ferreira | | (substituted on) 73' |
| FW | 11 | (Brazil) Éverton |
Manager:
(Brazil) Renato Gaúcho

| GK | 21 | (Brazil) Weverton |
| RB | 2 | (Brazil) Marcos Rocha |
| CB | 13 | (Brazil) Luan | (red card) 63' |
| CB | 15 | (Paraguay) Gustavo Gómez |
| LB | 17 | (Uruguay) Matías Viña |
| RM | 30 | (Brazil) Felipe Melo (c) |
| LM | 8 | (Brazil) Zé Rafael | (yellow card) 77' | (substituted off) 77' |
| RW | 23 | (Brazil) Raphael Veiga | | (substituted off) 67' |
| AM | 11 | (Brazil) Rony | | (substituted off) 77' |
| LW | 47 | (Brazil) Wesley | | (substituted off) 67' |
| CF | 10 | (Brazil) Luiz Adriano | | (substituted off) 70' |
Substitutes:
| GK | 42 | (Brazil) Jailson |
| GK | 72 | (Brazil) Vinícius Silvestre |
| DF | 12 | (Brazil) Mayke | | (substituted on) 77' |
| DF | 16 | (Brazil) Lucas Esteves |
| DF | 26 | (Brazil) Renan |
| DF | 33 | (Brazil) Alan Empereur | | (substituted on) 67' |
| MF | 14 | (Brazil) Gustavo Scarpa |
| MF | 20 | (Brazil) Lucas Lima |
| MF | 25 | (Brazil) Gabriel Menino | | (substituted on) 67' |
| MF | 28 | (Brazil) Danilo | | (substituted on) 77' |
| FW | 27 | (Brazil) Gabriel Veron | | (substituted on) 70' |
| FW | 29 | (Brazil) Willian | (yellow card) 84' |
Manager:
(Portugal) Abel Ferreira

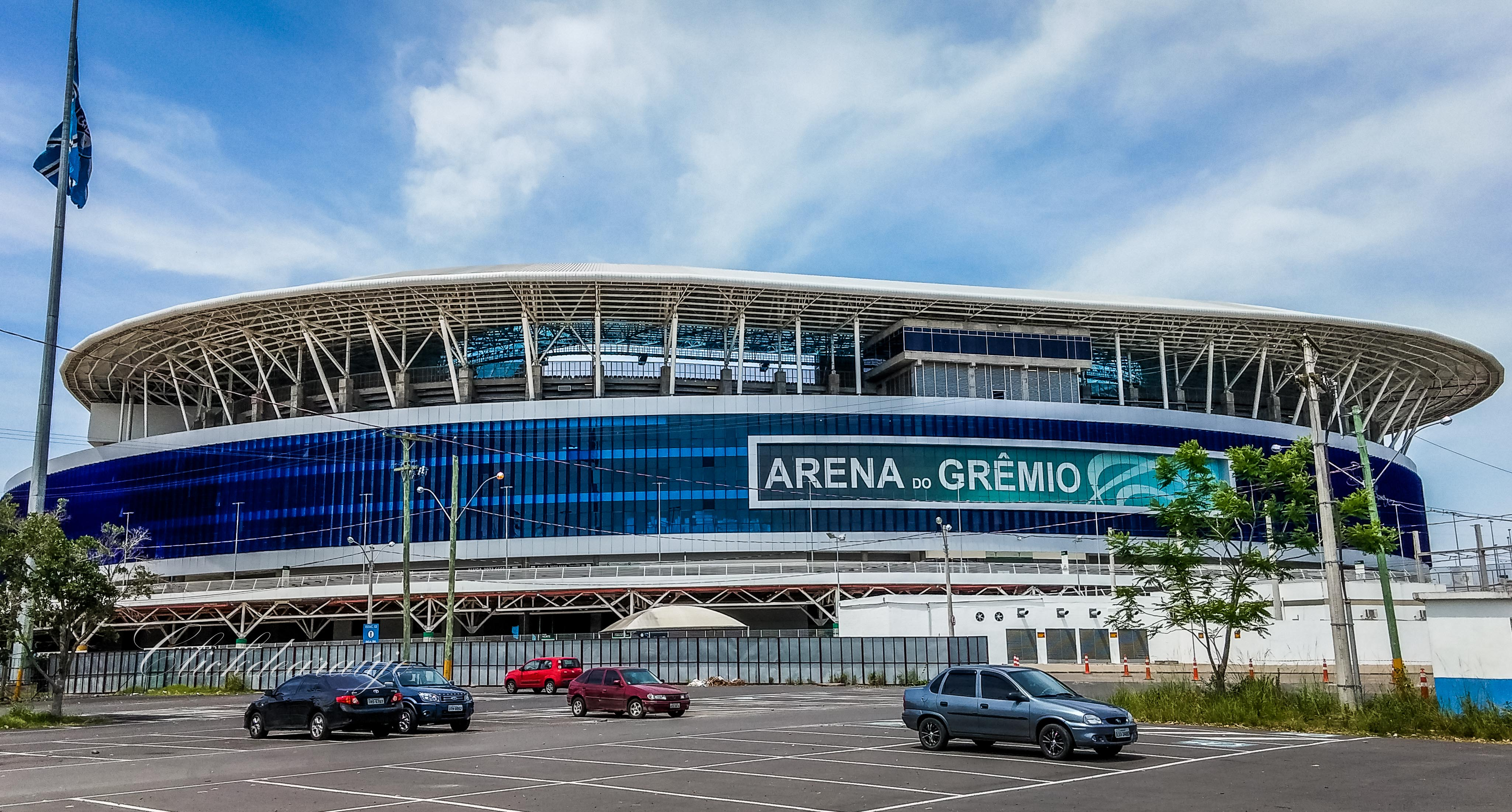
Arena do Grêmio in Porto Alegre hosted the first leg.

Man of the Match:
(Paraguay) Gustavo Gómez (Palmeiras)

Assistant referees:
Rodrigo Figueiredo Henrique Corrêa (Rio de Janeiro)
Alessandro Álvaro Rocha de Matos (Bahia)
Fourth official:
Sávio Pereira Sampaio (Distrito Federal)
Fifth official:
Guilherme Dias Camilo (Minas Gerais)
Video assistant referee:
Rodrigo Nunes de Sá (Rio de Janeiro)
Assistant video assistant referees:
Caio Max Augusto Vieira (Rio Grande do Norte)
Diogo Carvalho Silva (Rio de Janeiro)

=== Second leg ===
7 March 2021
18:00 UTC−3

| Palmeiras (São Paulo (state)) | 2–0 | (Rio Grande do Sul) Grêmio |
|---|---|---|
| Wesley 53'; Gabriel Menino 84' | Report |

Allianz Parque, São Paulo
Attendance: 0
Referee: Bruno Arleu de Araújo (Rio de Janeiro)

| **Palmeiras** | **Grêmio** |

| GK | 21 | (Brazil) Weverton |
| RB | 2 | (Brazil) Marcos Rocha | (yellow card) 86' |
| CB | 15 | (Paraguay) Gustavo Gómez |
| CB | 33 | (Brazil) Alan Empereur |
| LB | 17 | (Uruguay) Matías Viña |
| DM | 30 | (Brazil) Felipe Melo (c) |
| RM | 8 | (Brazil) Zé Rafael | (yellow card) 16' | (substituted off) 63' |
| LM | 23 | (Brazil) Raphael Veiga | | (substituted off) 73' |
| RW | 11 | (Brazil) Rony |
| LW | 47 | (Brazil) Wesley | | (substituted off) 73' |
| CF | 10 | (Brazil) Luiz Adriano | | (substituted off) 73' |
Substitutes:
| GK | 42 | (Brazil) Jailson |
| DF | 4 | (Chile) Benjamín Kuscevic |
| DF | 12 | (Brazil) Mayke | (yellow card) 54' | (substituted on) 73' |
| DF | 16 | (Brazil) Lucas Esteves | (yellow card) 85' |
| DF | 26 | (Brazil) Renan |
| MF | 5 | (Brazil) Patrick de Paula | | (substituted on) 63' |
| MF | 14 | (Brazil) Gustavo Scarpa |
| MF | 20 | (Brazil) Lucas Lima |
| MF | 25 | (Brazil) Gabriel Menino | (yellow card) 84' | (substituted on) 73' |
| MF | 28 | (Brazil) Danilo |
| FW | 27 | (Brazil) Gabriel Veron |
| FW | 29 | (Brazil) Willian | | (substituted on) 73' |
Manager:
(Portugal) Abel Ferreira

| GK | 1 | (Brazil) Paulo Victor |
| RB | 35 | (Brazil) Vanderson | | (substituted off) 77' |
| CB | 28 | (Brazil) Paulo Miranda | (yellow card) 26' |
| CB | 4 | (Argentina) Walter Kannemann | (yellow card) 30' | (substituted off) 77' |
| LB | 32 | (Brazil) Diogo Barbosa |
| RM | 8 | (Brazil) Maicon (c) |
| LM | 7 | (Brazil) Matheus Henrique |
| AM | 20 | (Brazil) Thaciano | | (substituted off) 68' |
| AM | 23 | (Brazil) Alisson | | (substituted off) 60' |
| RF | 29 | (Brazil) Diego Souza |
| LF | 25 | (Brazil) Pepê | | (substituted off) 60' |
Substitutes:
| GK | 27 | (Brazil) Vanderlei |
| DF | 2 | (Brazil) Victor Ferraz | | (substituted on) 77' |
| DF | 12 | (Brazil) Bruno Cortez |
| DF | 14 | (Brazil) David Braz |
| DF | 38 | (Brazil) Rodrigues |
| MF | 10 | (Brazil) Jean Pyerre | | (substituted on) 68' |
| MF | 15 | (Brazil) Darlan |
| MF | 16 | (Brazil) Lucas Silva |
| MF | 46 | (Brazil) Isaque |
| FW | 19 | (Argentina) Diego Churín | | (substituted on) 77' |
| FW | 39 | (Brazil) Guilherme Azevedo | | (substituted on) 60' |
| FW | 47 | (Brazil) Ferreira | | (substituted on) 60' |
Manager:
(Brazil) Renato Gaúcho

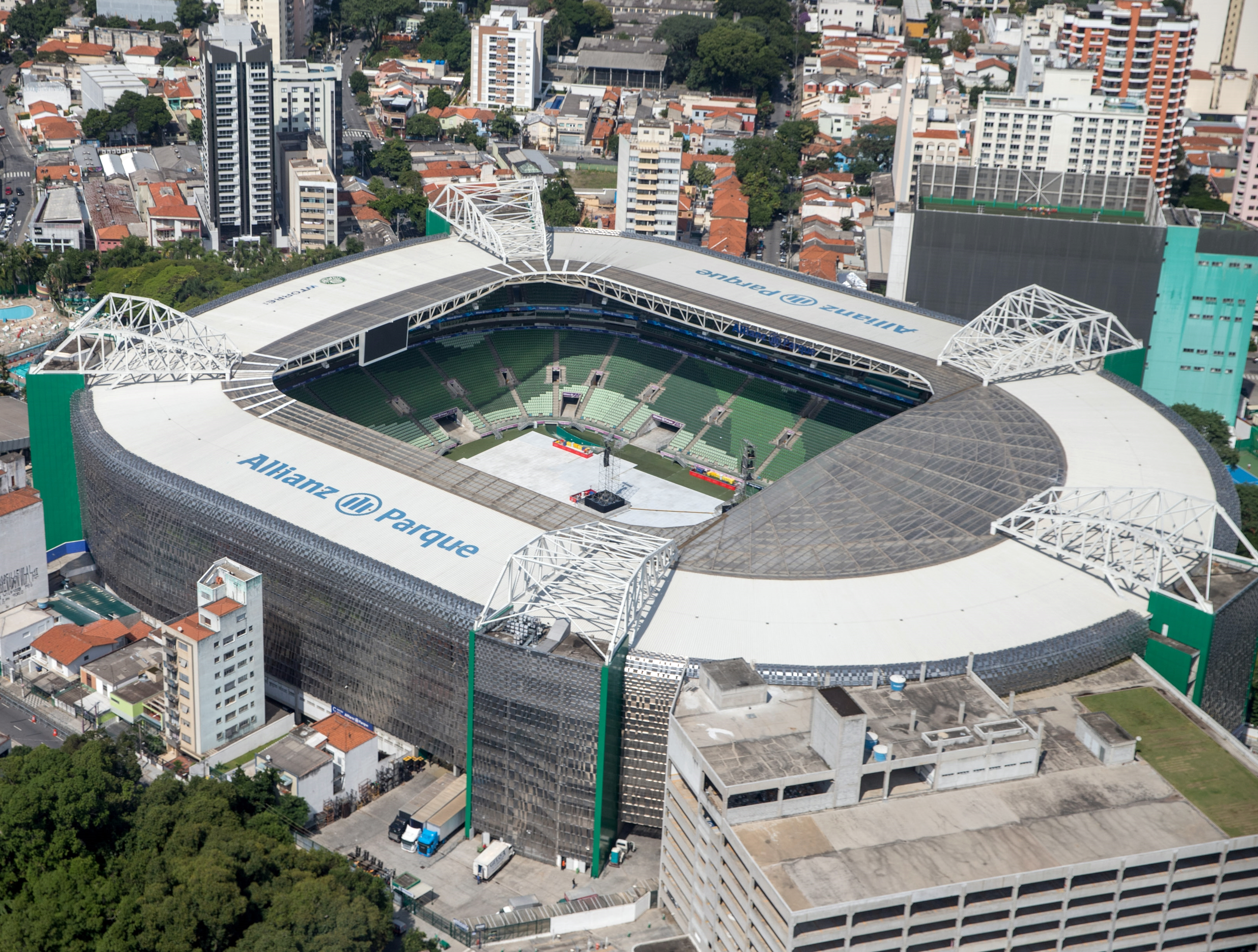
Allianz Parque in São Paulo hosted the second leg.

Man of the Match:
(Brazil) Wesley (Palmeiras)

Assistant referees:
Kléber Lúcio Gil (Santa Catarina)
Bruno Raphael Pires (Goiás)
Fourth official:
Bráulio da Silva Machado (Santa Catarina)
Fifth official:
Bruno Boschilia (Paraná)
Video assistant referee:
Igor Junio Benevenuto (Minas Gerais)
Assistant video assistant referees:
Gilberto Rodrigues Castro Júnior (Pernambuco)
Leone Carvalho Rocha (Goiás)

== See also ==
- 2020 Campeonato Brasileiro Série A
