= List of Copa do Brasil winning managers =

The Copa do Brasil was established in the 1989 season and Cláudio Duarte won the first edition with Grêmio. Luiz Felipe Scolari was the first manager to win the competition several times and is the manager with the most overall wins in the competition with four. He is followed by Mano Menezes who has three wins in the Copa do Brasil. Mano Menezes was also the first manager to win the tournament consecutively. Levir Culpi and Renato Gaúcho are the other managers to have won the Copa do Brasil more than once. Abel Ferreira from Portugal was the first foreign manager to win the competition.

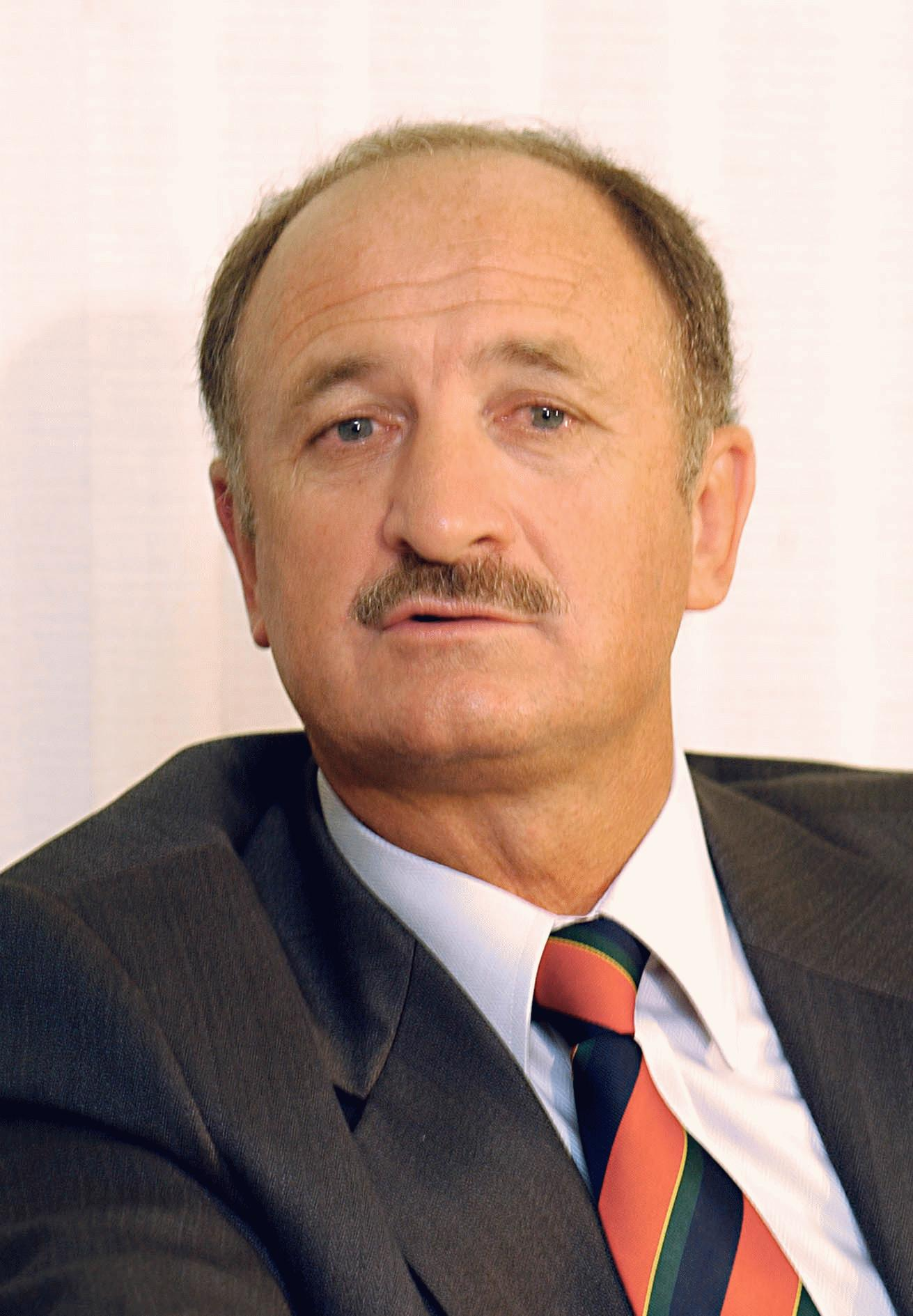
Luiz Felipe Scolari, winning manager in 1991, 1994, 1998 and 2012

== Winning managers ==
Final	Nat.	Winning manager	Club
1989	BRA	Cláudio Duarte	Grêmio
1990	BRA	Jair Pereira	Flamengo
1991	BRA	Luiz Felipe Scolari	Criciúma
1992	BRA	Antônio Lopes	Internacional
1993	BRA	João Pinheiro	Cruzeiro
1994	BRA	Luiz Felipe Scolari	Grêmio
1995	BRA	Eduardo Amorim	Corinthians
1996	BRA	Levir Culpi	Cruzeiro
1997	BRA	Evaristo de Macedo	Grêmio
1998	BRA	Luiz Felipe Scolari	Palmeiras
1999	BRA	Valmir Louruz	Juventude
2000	BRA	Marco Aurélio	Cruzeiro
2001	BRA	Tite	Grêmio
2002	BRA	Carlos Alberto Parreira	Corinthians
2003	BRA	Vanderlei Luxemburgo	Cruzeiro
2004	BRA	Péricles Chamusca	Santo André
2005	BRA	Vagner Mancini	Paulista
2006	BRA	Ney Franco	Flamengo
2007	BRA	Renato Gaúcho	Fluminense
2008	BRA	Nelsinho Baptista	Sport
2009	BRA	Mano Menezes	Corinthians
2010	BRA	Dorival Júnior	Santos
2011	BRA	Ricardo Gomes	Vasco da Gama
2012	BRA	Luiz Felipe Scolari	Palmeiras
2013	BRA	Jayme de Almeida	Flamengo
2014	BRA	Levir Culpi	Atlético Mineiro
2015	BRA	Marcelo Oliveira	Palmeiras
2016	BRA	Renato Gaúcho	Grêmio
2017	BRA	Mano Menezes	Cruzeiro
2018	BRA	Mano Menezes	Cruzeiro
2019	BRA	Tiago Nunes	Athletico Paranaense
2020	POR	Abel Ferreira	Palmeiras
2021	BRA	Cuca	Atlético Mineiro
2022	BRA	Dorival Júnior	Flamengo
2023	BRA	Dorival Júnior	São Paulo
2024	BRA	Filipe Luís	Flamengo
2025	BRA	Dorival Júnior	Corinthians

== Managers with multiple titles ==
Rank	Nationality	Manager	Number of wins	Years won	Club(s)
1	(Brazil)	Luiz Felipe Scolari	4	1991, 1994, 1998, 2012	Criciúma, Grêmio, Palmeiras
1	(Brazil)	Dorival Júnior	4	2010, 2022, 2023, 2025	Santos, Flamengo, São Paulo, Corinthians
3	(Brazil)	Mano Menezes	3	2009, 2017, 2018	Corinthians, Cruzeiro
4	(Brazil)	Levir Culpi	2	1996, 2014	Cruzeiro, Atlético Mineiro
4	(Brazil)	Renato Gaúcho	2	2007, 2016	Fluminense, Grêmio
