= Sabino (footballer, born 1999) =

Brazilian footballer

Personal information
- Full name: Mateus William Sabino Silva
- Date of birth: 18 May 1999 (age 27)
- Place of birth: Osasco, Brazil
- Height: 1.80 m (5 ft 11 in)
- Positions: Defensive midfielder; centre-back

Youth career
- Audax
- 2018–2019: América Mineiro

Senior career*
Years	Team	Apps	(Gls)
2019–2021	América Mineiro	20	(0)
2020	→ Villa Nova (loan)	4	(0)
2022	Santo André	9	(0)
2022	Brasil de Pelotas	6	(0)
2023	Patrocinense	7	(0)
2023–2024	Betim Futebol		
2024	Uberlândia	8	(1)
2024	Betim Futebol		
2024–2026	Oliveirense	54	(1)
- * Club domestic league appearances and goals as of 20 June 2026

Mateus William Sabino Silva (born 18 May 1999), commonly known as Sabino, is a Brazilian footballer who plays as either a defensive midfielder or centre-back.

== Club career ==
Born in Osasco, São Paulo, Sabino joined América Mineiro's youth setup in 2018, from Audax. He made his first team debut on 17 March 2019, coming on as a late substitute for Marcelo Toscano in a 2–3 Campeonato Mineiro away loss against Atlético Mineiro.

On 31 December 2019, Sabino was loaned to Villa Nova for the 2020 Mineiro. Upon returning, he renewed his contract until June 2021 on 20 August 2020.

On 20 April 2021, after being more regularly used as a defensive midfielder, Sabino further extended his contract until the end of the year. He made his Série A debut on 17 June, replacing Juninho Valoura in a 0–0 home draw against Cuiabá.

== Career statistics ==
As of 13 October 2021

Club	Season	League			State League		Cup		Continental		Other		Total	
Club	Season	Division	Apps	Goals	Apps	Goals	Apps	Goals	Apps	Goals	Apps	Goals	Apps	Goals
América Mineiro	2019	Série B	0	0	1	0	0	0	—		—		1	0
América Mineiro	2020	Série B	7	0	0	0	2	0	—		—		9	0
América Mineiro	2021	Série A	5	0	7	0	2	0	—		—		14	0
América Mineiro	Total		12	0	8	0	4	0	—		—		24	0
Villa Nova (loan)	2020	Mineiro	—		4	0	—		—		—		4	0
Career total			12	0	12	0	4	0	0	0	0	0	28	0
