= 2019 Copa do Brasil Final Stages =

The 2019 Copa do Brasil final stages were the final stages (round of 16, quarter-finals, semi-finals and finals) of the 2019 Copa do Brasil football competition. They were played from 15 May to 18 September 2019. A total of 16 teams competed in the final stages to decide the champions of the 2019 Copa do Brasil.

== Format ==
In the final stages, each tie was played on a home-and-away two-legged basis. If tied on aggregate, the away goals rule would not be used, extra time would not be played and the penalty shoot-out would be used to determine the winner.

== Bracket ==
Round of 16
(Rio Grande do Sul) Juventude	0	0	0
(Rio Grande do Sul) Grêmio	0	3	3
(São Paulo (state)) São Paulo	0	0	0
Bahia	1	1	2
(Ceará) Fortaleza	0	0	0
(Paraná (state)) Athletico Paranaense	0	1	1
(São Paulo (state)) Corinthians	0	0	0
(Rio de Janeiro (state)) Flamengo	1	1	2
(Rio de Janeiro (state)) Fluminense	1	2	3 (1)
(Minas Gerais) Cruzeiro (p)	1	2	3 (3)
(Minas Gerais) Atlético Mineiro	0	2	2
(São Paulo (state)) Santos	0	1	1
(Maranhão) Sampaio Corrêa	0	0	0
(São Paulo (state)) Palmeiras	1	2	3
(Rio Grande do Sul) Internacional	3	1	4
(Pará) Paysandu	1	0	1

Quarter-finals
(Rio Grande do Sul) Grêmio	1	1	2
Bahia	1	0	1
(Paraná (state)) Athletico Paranaense (p)	1	1	2 (3)
(Rio de Janeiro (state)) Flamengo	1	1	2 (1)
(Minas Gerais) Cruzeiro	3	0	3
(Minas Gerais) Atlético Mineiro	0	2	2
(São Paulo (state)) Palmeiras	1	0	1 (4)
(Rio Grande do Sul) Internacional (p)	0	1	1 (5)

Semi-finals
(Rio Grande do Sul) Grêmio	2	0	2 (4)
(Paraná (state)) Athletico Paranaense (p)	0	2	2 (5)
(Minas Gerais) Cruzeiro	0	0	0
(Rio Grande do Sul) Internacional	1	3	4

Finals
(Paraná (state)) Athletico Paranaense	1	2	3
(Rio Grande do Sul) Internacional	0	1	1

== Round of 16 ==
=== Draw ===
The draw for the round of 16 was held on 2 May 2019, 15:00 at CBF headquarters in Rio de Janeiro. The 16 qualified teams were divided in two pots. Teams from Pot 1 were the ones which competed at the 2019 Copa Libertadores. Pot 2 was composed of the five teams which qualified through the Fourth Stage plus the champions of 2018 Copa Verde, 2018 Copa do Nordeste and 2018 Campeonato Brasileiro Série B.

- CBF ranking shown in brackets.

Pot 1	Pot 2
(São Paulo (state)) Palmeiras (1); (Minas Gerais) Cruzeiro (2); (Rio Grande do Sul) Grêmio (3); (Rio de Janeiro (state)) Flamengo (6); (Minas Gerais) Atlético Mineiro (7); (Paraná (state)) Athletico Paranaense (8); (Rio Grande do Sul) Internacional (9); (São Paulo (state)) São Paulo (12)	(São Paulo (state)) Santos (4); (São Paulo (state)) Corinthians (5); (Rio de Janeiro (state)) Fluminense (13); Bahia (15); (Pará) Paysandu (27); (Rio Grande do Sul) Juventude^{[+]} (31); (Ceará) Fortaleza (33); (Maranhão) Sampaio Corrêa (38)

^{+} The identity of Winners 71 team was not known at the time of the draw.

=== Matches ===
The first legs were played from 15 to 23 May and the second legs were played from 29 May to 6 June 2019.

Team 1	Agg.	Team 2	1st leg	2nd leg
Internacional (Rio Grande do Sul)	4–1	(Pará) Paysandu	3–1	1–0
Corinthians (São Paulo (state))	0–2	(Rio de Janeiro (state)) Flamengo	0–1	0–1
Atlético Mineiro (Minas Gerais)	2–1	(São Paulo (state)) Santos	0–0	2–1
Juventude (Rio Grande do Sul)	0–3	(Rio Grande do Sul) Grêmio	0–0	0–3
Sampaio Corrêa (Maranhão)	0–3	(São Paulo (state)) Palmeiras	0–1	0–2
Fortaleza (Ceará)	0–1	(Paraná (state)) Athletico Paranaense	0–0	0–1
Fluminense (Rio de Janeiro (state))	3–3 (1–3 p)	(Minas Gerais) Cruzeiro	1–1	2–2
São Paulo (São Paulo (state))	0–2	Bahia	0–1	0–1

All times are Brasília time, BRT (UTC−3)

=== Match 76 ===
23 May 2019
20:00

Internacional (Rio Grande do Sul)	3–1	(Pará) Paysandu
Guerrero 25', 78'; Rodrigo Lindoso 57'	Report	Micael 48'

Estádio Beira-Rio, Porto Alegre
Attendance: 14,219
Referee: Vinícius Gonçalves Dias Araújo (São Paulo)

29 May 2019
19:15

Paysandu (Pará)	0–1	(Rio Grande do Sul) Internacional
	Report	Guerrero 85'

Estádio Olímpico do Pará, Belém
Attendance: 12,386
Referee: Marcelo Aparecido Ribeiro de Souza (Paraíba)

Internacional won 4–1 on aggregate and advanced to the quarter-finals.

=== Match 77 ===
15 May 2019
21:30

Corinthians (São Paulo (state))	0–1	(Rio de Janeiro (state)) Flamengo
	Report	Willian Arão 78'

Arena Corinthians, São Paulo
Attendance: 30,364
Referee: Anderson Daronco (Rio Grande do Sul)

4 June 2019
21:30

Flamengo (Rio de Janeiro (state))	1–0	(São Paulo (state)) Corinthians
Rodrigo Caio 88'	Report

Maracanã, Rio de Janeiro
Attendance: 60,171
Referee: Leandro Vuaden (Rio Grande do Sul)

Flamengo won 2–0 on aggregate and advanced to the quarter-finals.

=== Match 78 ===
15 May 2019
19:15

Atlético Mineiro (Minas Gerais)	0–0	(São Paulo (state)) Santos
	Report

Estádio Independência, Belo Horizonte
Attendance: 11,176
Referee: Rodrigo D'Alonso Ferreira (Santa Catarina)

6 June 2019
20:00

Santos (São Paulo (state))	1–2	(Minas Gerais) Atlético Mineiro
Gustavo Henrique 5'	Report	Chará 36', 84'

Pacaembu, São Paulo
Attendance: 16,857
Referee: Bruno Arleu de Araújo (Rio de Janeiro)

Atlético Mineiro won 2–1 on aggregate and advanced to the quarter-finals.

=== Match 79 ===
22 May 2019
21:30

Juventude (Rio Grande do Sul)	0–0	(Rio Grande do Sul) Grêmio
	Report

Estádio Alfredo Jaconi, Caxias do Sul
Attendance: 10,028
Referee: Ricardo Marques (Minas Gerais)

29 May 2019
21:30

Grêmio (Rio Grande do Sul)	3–0	(Rio Grande do Sul) Juventude
Felipe Vizeu 39', 68'; Diego Tardelli 82'	Report

Arena do Grêmio, Porto Alegre
Attendance: 19,560
Referee: Wagner do Nascimento Magalhães (Rio de Janeiro)

Grêmio won 3–0 on aggregate and advanced to the quarter-finals.

=== Match 80 ===
22 May 2019
19:15

Sampaio Corrêa (Maranhão)	0–1	(São Paulo (state)) Palmeiras
	Report	Moisés 90+1'

Castelão, São Luís
Attendance: 22,680
Referee: Rodrigo D'Alonso Ferreira (Santa Catarina)

30 May 2019
20:00

Palmeiras (São Paulo (state))	2–0	(Maranhão) Sampaio Corrêa
Mayke 39'; Zé Rafael 49'	Report

Allianz Parque, São Paulo
Attendance: 26,880
Referee: Jean Pierre Gonçalves Lima (Rio Grande do Sul)

Palmeiras won 3–0 on aggregate and advanced to the quarter-finals.

=== Match 81 ===
16 May 2019
19:15

Fortaleza (Ceará)	0–0	(Paraná (state)) Athletico Paranaense
	Report

Castelão, Fortaleza
Attendance: 27,075
Referee: Bráulio da Silva Machado (Santa Catarina)

5 June 2019
19:15

Athletico Paranaense (Paraná (state))	1–0	(Ceará) Fortaleza
Ruben 88'	Report

Arena da Baixada, Curitiba
Attendance: 14,863
Referee: Flávio Rodrigues de Souza (São Paulo)

Athletico Paranaense won 1–0 on aggregate and advanced to the quarter-finals.

=== Match 82 ===
15 May 2019
21:30

Fluminense (Rio de Janeiro (state))	1–1	(Minas Gerais) Cruzeiro
João Pedro 90+3'	Report	Pedro Rocha 57'

Maracanã, Rio de Janeiro
Attendance: 16,806
Referee: Luiz Flávio de Oliveira (São Paulo)

5 June 2019
19:15

Cruzeiro (Minas Gerais)	2–2	(Rio de Janeiro (state)) Fluminense
Thiago Neves 58', 80' (pen.)	Report	Ganso 15' (pen.); João Pedro 90+5'
Penalties
Lucas Silva (penalty missed); Romero (penalty missed); Pedro Rocha (penalty scored); Sassá (penalty scored); Thiago Neves (penalty scored)	3–1	(penalty missed) Ganso; (penalty scored) Caio Henrique; (penalty missed) João Pedro; (penalty missed) Gilberto

Mineirão, Belo Horizonte
Attendance: 47,460
Referee: Rafael Traci (Santa Catarina)

Tied 3–3 on aggregate, Cruzeiro won on penalties and advanced to the quarter-finals.

=== Match 83 ===
22 May 2019
21:30

São Paulo (São Paulo (state))	0–1	Bahia
	Report	Élber 72'

Estádio do Morumbi, São Paulo
Attendance: 19,508
Referee: Bruno Arleu de Araújo (Rio de Janeiro)

29 May 2019
21:30

Bahia	1–0	(São Paulo (state)) São Paulo
Ernando 54'	Report

Arena Fonte Nova, Salvador
Attendance: 36,016
Referee: Marcelo de Lima Henrique (Rio de Janeiro)

Bahia won 2–0 on aggregate and advanced to the quarter-finals.

== Quarter-finals ==
=== Draw ===
The draw for the quarter-finals was held on 10 June 2019, 15:00 at CBF headquarters in Rio de Janeiro. All teams were placed into a single pot.

- CBF ranking shown in brackets.

Pot
- (São Paulo (state)) Palmeiras (1)
- (Minas Gerais) Cruzeiro (2)
- (Rio Grande do Sul) Grêmio (3)
- (Rio de Janeiro (state)) Flamengo (6)
- (Minas Gerais) Atlético Mineiro (7)
- (Paraná (state)) Athletico Paranaense (8)
- (Rio Grande do Sul) Internacional (9)
- Bahia (15)

=== Matches ===
The first legs were played on 10 and 11 July and the second legs were played on 17 July 2019.

Team 1	Agg.	Team 2	1st leg	2nd leg
Grêmio (Rio Grande do Sul)	2–1	Bahia	1–1	1–0
Athletico Paranaense (Paraná (state))	2–2 (3–1 p)	(Rio de Janeiro (state)) Flamengo	1–1	1–1
Cruzeiro (Minas Gerais)	3–2	(Minas Gerais) Atlético Mineiro	3–0	0–2
Palmeiras (São Paulo (state))	1–1 (4–5 p)	(Rio Grande do Sul) Internacional	1–0	0–1

All times are Brasília time, BRT (UTC−3)

=== Match 84 ===
10 July 2019
19:15

Grêmio (Rio Grande do Sul)	1–1	Bahia
Everton 45+2' (pen.)	Report	Gilberto 48'

Arena do Grêmio, Porto Alegre
Attendance: 26,674
Referee: Marcelo de Lima Henrique (Rio de Janeiro)

17 July 2019
19:15

Bahia	0–1	(Rio Grande do Sul) Grêmio
	Report	Alisson 63'

Arena Fonte Nova, Salvador
Attendance: 46,341
Referee: Bráulio da Silva Machado (Santa Catarina)

Grêmio won 2–1 on aggregate and advanced to the semi-finals.

=== Match 85 ===
10 July 2019
21:30

Athletico Paranaense (Paraná (state))	1–1	(Rio de Janeiro (state)) Flamengo
Léo Pereira 49'	Report	Gabriel 64'

Arena da Baixada, Curitiba
Attendance: 21,306
Referee: Anderson Daronco (Rio Grande do Sul)

17 July 2019
21:30

Flamengo (Rio de Janeiro (state))	1–1	(Paraná (state)) Athletico Paranaense
Gabriel 62'	Report	Rony 77'
Penalties
Diego (penalty missed); Vitinho (penalty missed); Cuéllar (penalty scored); Éverton Ribeiro (penalty missed)	1–3	(penalty scored) Jonathan; (penalty scored) González; (penalty missed) Bruno Nazário; (penalty scored) Bruno Guimarães

Maracanã, Rio de Janeiro
Attendance: 69,980
Referee: Wilton Sampaio (Goiás)

Tied 2–2 on aggregate, Athletico Paranaense won on penalties and advanced to the semi-finals.

=== Match 86 ===
11 July 2019
20:00

Cruzeiro (Minas Gerais)	3–0	(Minas Gerais) Atlético Mineiro
Pedro Rocha 12'; Thiago Neves 26'; Robinho 54'	Report

Mineirão, Belo Horizonte
Attendance: 51,958
Referee: Raphael Claus (São Paulo)

17 July 2019
19:15

Atlético Mineiro (Minas Gerais)	2–0	(Minas Gerais) Cruzeiro
Cazares 34'; Patric 90+2'	Report

Estádio Independência, Belo Horizonte
Attendance: 22,145
Referee: Flávio Rodrigues de Souza (São Paulo)

Cruzeiro won 3–2 on aggregate and advanced to the semi-finals.

=== Match 87 ===
10 July 2019
21:30

Palmeiras (São Paulo (state))	1–0	(Rio Grande do Sul) Internacional
Zé Rafael 19'	Report

Allianz Parque, São Paulo
Attendance: 36,443
Referee: Wilton Sampaio (Goiás)

17 July 2019
21:30

Internacional (Rio Grande do Sul)	1–0	(São Paulo (state)) Palmeiras
Patrick 40'	Report
Penalties
Guerrero (penalty scored); Rafael Sóbis (penalty scored); Edenílson (penalty scored); Rodrigo Lindoso (penalty scored); Patrick (penalty missed); Nonato (penalty scored)	5–4	(penalty scored) Bruno Henrique; (penalty missed) Gómez; (penalty scored) Diogo Barbosa; (penalty scored) Luan; (penalty scored) Willian; (penalty missed) Moisés

Estádio Beira-Rio, Porto Alegre
Attendance: 40,229
Referee: Rafael Traci (Santa Catarina)

Tied 1–1 on aggregate, Internacional won on penalties and advanced to the semi-finals.

== Semi-finals ==
=== Draw ===
The draw to determine the home-and-away teams for both legs was held on 22 July 2019, 15:00 at CBF headquarters in Rio de Janeiro.

=== Matches ===
The first legs were played on 7 and 14 August and the second legs were played on 4 September 2019.

Team 1	Agg.	Team 2	1st leg	2nd leg
Grêmio (Rio Grande do Sul)	2–2 (4–5 p)	(Paraná (state)) Athletico Paranaense	2–0	0–2
Cruzeiro (Minas Gerais)	0–4	(Rio Grande do Sul) Internacional	0–1	0–3

All times are Brasília time, BRT (UTC−3)

=== Match 88 ===
14 August 2019
21:30

Grêmio (Rio Grande do Sul)	2–0	(Paraná (state)) Athletico Paranaense
André 23'; Jean Pyerre 72'	Report

Arena do Grêmio, Porto Alegre
Attendance: 40,175
Referee: Marcelo de Lima Henrique (Rio de Janeiro)

4 September 2019
19:00

Athletico Paranaense (Paraná (state))	2–0	(Rio Grande do Sul) Grêmio
Nikão 16'; Ruben 48'	Report
Penalties
Bruno Guimarães (penalty scored); González (penalty scored); Nikão (penalty scored); Marcelo Cirino (penalty scored); Ruben (penalty scored)	5–4	(penalty scored) Rafael Galhardo; (penalty scored) David Braz; (penalty scored) Alisson; (penalty scored) Matheus Henrique; (penalty missed) Pepê

Arena da Baixada, Curitiba
Attendance: 26,978
Referee: Wagner do Nascimento Magalhães (Rio de Janeiro)

Tied 2–2 on aggregate, Athletico Paranaense won on penalties and advanced to the finals.

=== Match 89 ===
7 August 2019
21:30

Cruzeiro (Minas Gerais)	0–1	(Rio Grande do Sul) Internacional
	Report	Edenílson 75'

Mineirão, Belo Horizonte
Attendance: 33,344
Referee: Luiz Flávio de Oliveira (São Paulo)

4 September 2019
21:30

Internacional (Rio Grande do Sul)	3–0	(Minas Gerais) Cruzeiro
Guerrero 39', 69'; Edenílson 89'	Report

Estádio Beira-Rio, Porto Alegre
Attendance: 43,175
Referee: Flávio Rodrigues de Souza (São Paulo)

Internacional won 4–0 on aggregate and advanced to the finals.

== Finals ==
=== Draw ===
The draw to determine the home-and-away teams for both legs was held on 5 September 2019, 15:00 at CBF headquarters in Rio de Janeiro.

=== Matches ===
The first leg was played on 11 September and the second leg was played on 18 September 2019.

Team 1	Agg.	Team 2	1st leg	2nd leg
Athletico Paranaense (Paraná (state))	3–1	(Rio Grande do Sul) Internacional	1–0	2–1

All times are Brasília time, BRT (UTC−3)

=== Match 90 ===
11 September 2019
21:30

Athletico Paranaense (Paraná (state))	1–0	(Rio Grande do Sul) Internacional
Bruno Guimarães 57'	Report

Arena da Baixada, Curitiba
Attendance: 38,490
Referee: Raphael Claus (São Paulo)

18 September 2019
21:30

Internacional (Rio Grande do Sul)	1–2	(Paraná (state)) Athletico Paranaense
López 31'	Report	Léo Cittadini 24'; Rony 90+6'

Estádio Beira-Rio, Porto Alegre
Attendance: 46,747
Referee: Wilton Sampaio (Goiás)
