= Abel Ferreira =

Portuguese football player and manager

Abel Ferreira ComIH
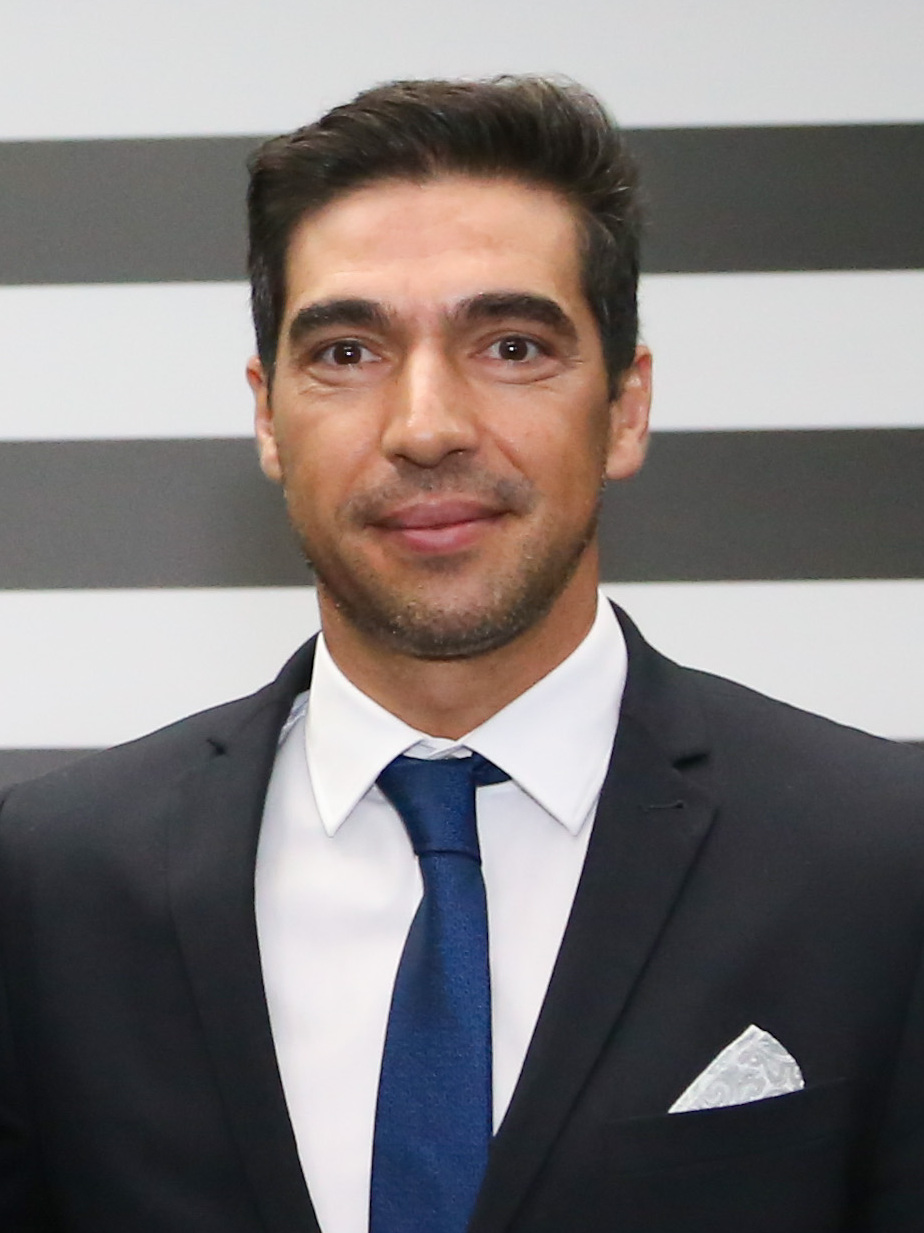
- Ferreira in 2022

Personal information
- Full name: Abel Fernando Moreira Ferreira
- Date of birth: 22 December 1978 (age 47)
- Place of birth: Penafiel, Portugal
- Height: 1.78 m (5 ft 10 in)
- Position: Right-back

Team information
- Current team: Palmeiras (head coach)

Youth career
- 1989–1997: Penafiel

Senior career*
Years	Team	Apps	(Gls)
1997–2000	Penafiel	62	(4)
2000–2004	Vitória Guimarães	80	(1)
2004–2005	Braga	43	(0)
2006–2011	Sporting CP	111	(2)
Total		296	(7)

International career
2002–2005	Portugal B	2	(0)

Managerial career
- 2011–2013: Sporting CP (juniors)
- 2013–2014: Sporting CP B
- 2015–2017: Braga B
- 2016: Braga (interim)
- 2017–2019: Braga
- 2019–2020: PAOK
- 2020–: Palmeiras
- * Club domestic league appearances and goals

Abel Fernando Moreira Ferreira ComIH (born 22 December 1978), known simply as Abel as a player, is a Portuguese professional football manager and former player. He is the head coach of Campeonato Brasileiro Série A club Palmeiras.

As a right-back, he played 234 Primeira Liga matches over 11 seasons (scoring three goals), with Vitória de Guimarães, Braga and Sporting CP. With Sporting, he won two Taça de Portugal and two Supertaça Cândido de Oliveira in a 14-year career.

Ferreira started working as a manager in 2013, being in charge of Sporting CP B, Braga B, Braga, PAOK and Palmeiras. With the latter club, he won the Copa do Brasil in 2020, two successive Copa Libertadores in 2020 and 2021 and the Campeonato Brasileiro Série A in 2022 and 2023.

== Playing career ==
=== Penafiel, Guimarães and Braga ===
Abel was born in Penafiel, Porto District. Having joined his hometown club Penafiel's youth ranks at age 10, he started his senior career in the 1997–98 season. After the manager of the first team reconverted him to right-back from central midfielder, he initially was against this decision and thought about quitting football.

In the summer of 2000, Vitória de Guimarães signed Abel and he would make his Primeira Liga debut at the club. For 2004–05, he moved to Braga.

=== Sporting CP ===
Abel transferred to Sporting CP in January 2006, in a two-way loan deal involving the Brazilian Wender. The move was made permanent before the 2006–07 campaign.

On 27 November 2007, Abel scored a goal against Manchester United in a UEFA Champions League group stage 2–1 away loss. In that season he was also called up for the Portugal national team, but did not earn any caps.

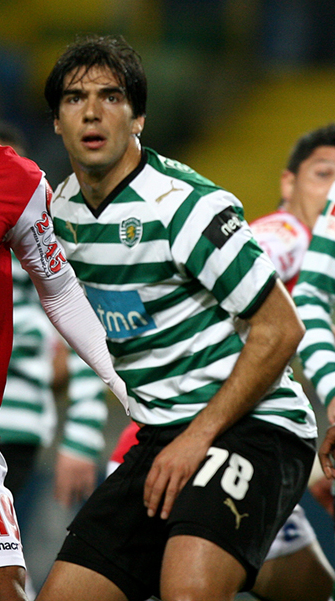
Ferreira playing for Sporting CP in 2009

In 2008–09, Abel lost his starting position to Pedro Silva. Both players lost their importance in the squad after the purchase of Braga's João Pereira in January 2010.

Abel was still regularly used in the following seasons, as Pereira featured regularly as a midfielder. On 24 October 2010, he scored his first league goal for Sporting, in the 90th minute to defeat Rio Ave at home (1–0).

Abel retired at the end of the 2010–11 season aged 32, due to injury problems.

== Coaching career ==
=== Sporting CP ===
Ferreira started working as a manager immediately after retiring, taking charge of Sporting's juniors as well as their reserves in the Segunda Liga. Due to disagreements with chairman Bruno de Carvalho during the 2014 preseason, he was fired from the latter.

=== Braga ===
In February 2015, Ferreira was appointed at Braga B in the same division. On 26 April 2017, he succeeded Jorge Simão at the helm of the first team.

Ferreira led them to fourth place in his first full season in charge, with the subsequent qualification for the UEFA Europa League's third qualifying round.

=== PAOK ===
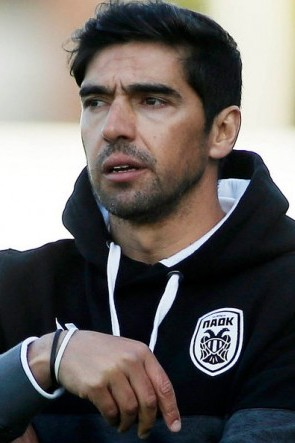
Ferreira with PAOK in 2019

PAOK paid a reported €2 million to acquire Ferreira's services on 30 June 2019, after former manager Răzvan Lucescu left for Al Hilal of Saudi Arabia. In his first year, the team were knocked out by Ajax in the Champions League third qualifying round when the opposition scored through two controversial penalties in the second leg. They were eliminated by Slovan Bratislava in the Europa League playoff round. On the domestic front, he led the side to second place in the Super League Greece, but was also in charge as the club's record of 51 matches unbeaten came to an end. They also reached the semi-finals of the Greek Cup.

Ferreira left the Toumba Stadium on 30 October 2020, following a 0–0 draw at Granada in the Europa League group stage.

=== Palmeiras ===
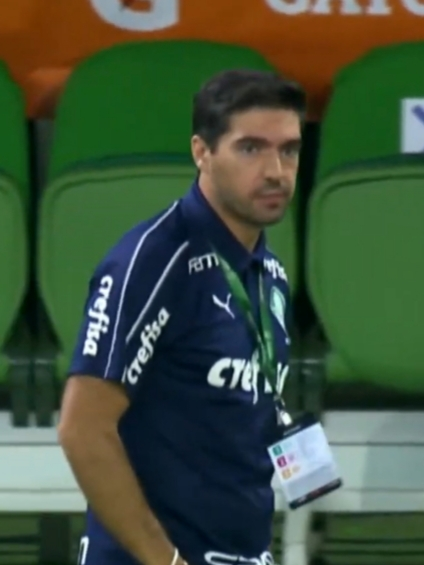
Ferreira managing Palmeiras in 2021

Ferreira was announced as head coach of Brazilian club Palmeiras that same day, on a two-year deal. He made his debut on 5 November 2020 in the last-16 second leg of the Copa do Brasil in a 1–0 home win against Red Bull Bragantino (4–1 aggregate). Three days later, on his Campeonato Brasileiro Série A debut, his team won away to Vasco da Gama.

On 30 January 2021, Ferreira won his first title as coach with a 1–0 victory over fellow Brazilians Santos in the final of the 2020 Copa Libertadores; only two other non-South American managers had won the tournament before, one being his compatriot Jorge Jesus, a year earlier, also with a Brazilian side, Flamengo.

On 7 March 2021, Palmeiras won the second leg of the Brazilian Cup final with a 2–0 home defeat of Grêmio, with the aggregate score being 3–0. Owing to this result, Ferreira became the first foreign coach to win the competition. On 27 November that year, his team retained the Libertadores with a 2–1 extra-time win in the final against Flamengo at the Estadio Centenario in Montevideo.

The team defeated Athletico Paranaense 2–0 at Allianz Parque on 2 March 2022, winning the Recopa Sudamericana for the first time; this was the third international championship won by Ferreira with the side, also making him the club's most successful head coach in those type of competitions. In November they were crowned Brazilian champions and, after the conquest of the Campeonato Paulista the following April, he became the foreign manager with the most trophies in the country.

In January 2024, shortly after winning another Brazilian League, Ferreira renewed his contract, with the new link running until December 2025.

== Personal life ==
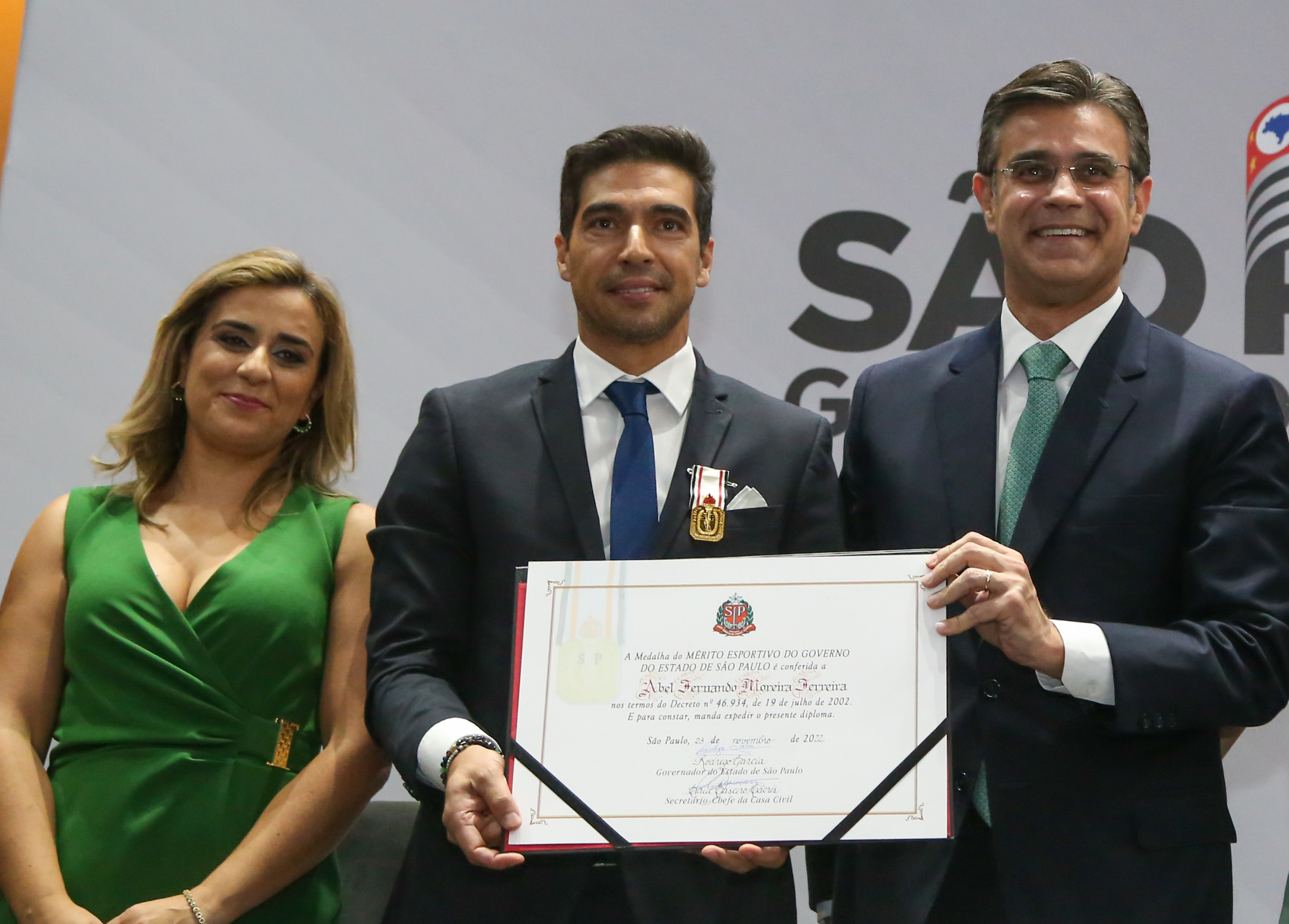
Ferreira and his wife Ana Xavier with Rodrigo Garcia in 2022

Ferreira married Ana Xavier, with whom he had two daughters, Inês and Mariana. In March 2021, he was appointed Commander of the Order of Prince Henry.

In December 2023, following the conquest of the Brazilian title which made him a two-time champion with Palmeiras, Ferreira recalled the sacrifices he made in his playing days, saying that he did not have many girlfriends or go to parties. He told the media his evenings were spent at home with his parents watching the Brazilian soap opera 'Tieta' on Portuguese television, which his mother considered too daring and sometimes closed the door on him, and explained that in order to achieve goals people have to "make sacrifices".

== Managerial statistics ==
As of match played 18 November 2026

Managerial record by team and tenure
Team	Nat	From	To	Record							
Team	Nat	From	To	G	W	D	L	GF	GA	GD	Win %
Sporting CP B	(Portugal)	1 July 2013	30 June 2014	42	20	10	12	61	50	+11	47.62
Braga B	(Portugal)	16 February 2015	26 April 2017	102	35	31	36	116	117	−1	34.31
Braga (interim)	(Portugal)	15 December 2016	19 December 2016	1	1	0	0	1	0	+1	100.00
Braga	(Portugal)	26 April 2017	1 July 2019	102	62	15	25	186	109	+77	60.78
PAOK	(Greece)	1 July 2019	29 October 2020	57	31	16	10	92	51	+41	54.39
Palmeiras	(Brazil)	30 October 2020	present	464	270	109	85	784	371	+413	58.19
Career total				768	418	181	169	1,240	698	+542	54.43

== Honours ==
=== Player ===
Sporting CP

- Taça de Portugal: 2006–07, 2007–08
- Supertaça Cândido de Oliveira: 2007, 2008

=== Manager ===
Palmeiras

- Campeonato Brasileiro Série A: 2022, 2023
- Copa do Brasil: 2020
- Supercopa do Brasil: 2023
- Copa Libertadores: 2020, 2021
- Recopa Sudamericana: 2022
- Campeonato Paulista: 2022, 2023, 2024, 2026
- FIFA Club World Cup runner-up: 2021

Individual

- Primeira Liga Manager of the Month: September 2018
- Copa Libertadores Coach of the Year: 2020, 2021
- Best Football Coach in Brazil: 2020
- Best Coach in Brazil by O Globo/Extra: 2020
- South American Coach of the Year: 2021
- Best Portuguese Coach Abroad by CNID: 2022
- Bola de Prata Coach of the Year: 2022, 2023
- Campeonato Brasileiro Série A Coach of the Year: 2022
- Campeonato Brasileiro Série A Coach of the Month: August 2023
- Campeonato Paulista Coach of the Year: 2024

=== Orders ===
- Knight Commander of the Order of Prince Henry

== Books ==
- Ferreira, Abel; Martinho, Carlos; Martins, João; Costa, Tiago; Castanheira, Vitor (2022). De Campos Jr, Celso (ed.). Cabeça Fria, Coração Quente [Cool Head, Hot Heart] (in Portuguese). Garoa Livros. ISBN 978-6599096389.
- Ferreira, Abel; Martinho, Carlos; Martins, João; Costa, Tiago; Castanheira, Vitor (2023). De Campos Jr, Celso (ed.). Volta extra: Temporada 2022 [Extra round: 2022 season] (in Portuguese). Garoa Livros. ISBN 978-8566683141.
