= 2019 Copa do Brasil finals =

2019 Copa do Brasil Finals
Athletico Paranaense	Internacional
(Paraná (state))	(Rio Grande do Sul)
3	1
- on aggregate

First leg
Athletico Paranaense	Internacional
1	0
- Date: 11 September 2019
- Venue: Arena da Baixada, Curitiba
- Man of the Match: Bruno Guimarães (Athletico Paranaense)
- Referee: Raphael Claus (São Paulo)
- Attendance: 38,490

Second leg
Internacional	Athletico Paranaense
1	2
- Date: 18 September 2019
- Venue: Estádio Beira-Rio, Porto Alegre
- Man of the Match: Rony (Athletico Paranaense)
- Referee: Wilton Sampaio (Goiás)
- Attendance: 46,747

The 2019 Copa do Brasil Finals were the final two-legged tie that decided the 2019 Copa do Brasil, the 31st season of the Copa do Brasil, Brazil's national cup football tournament organised by the Brazilian Football Confederation.

The finals were contested in a two-legged home-and-away format between Athletico Paranaense, from Paraná, and Internacional, from Rio Grande do Sul. Athletico Paranaense and Internacional reached the Copa do Brasil finals for the second and third time, respectively.

A draw by CBF was held on 5 September 2019 to determine the home-and-away teams for each leg. The first leg was hosted by Athletico Paranaense at Arena da Baixada in Curitiba on 11 September 2019, while the second leg was hosted by Internacional at Estádio Beira-Rio in Porto Alegre on 18 September 2019.

Athletico Paranaense defeated Internacional 3–1 on aggregate in the finals to win their first title. As champions, Athletico Paranaense qualified for the 2020 Copa Libertadores group stage and the 2020 Copa do Brasil round of 16.

Athletico Paranaense also earned the right to play in the 2020 Supercopa do Brasil against the 2019 Campeonato Brasileiro Série A champions.

== Teams ==
Team	Previous finals appearances (bold indicates winners)
(Paraná (state)) Athletico Paranaense	1 (2013)
(Rio Grande do Sul) Internacional	2 (**1992**, 2009)

=== Road to the final ===
Note: In all scores below, the score of the home team is given first.

(Paraná (state)) Athletico Paranaense			Round	(Rio Grande do Sul) Internacional		
Opponent	Venue	Score		Opponent	Venue	Score
(Ceará) Fortaleza (won 1–0 on aggregate)	Away	0–0	Round of 16	(Pará) Paysandu (won 4–1 on aggregate)	Home	3–1
(Ceará) Fortaleza (won 1–0 on aggregate)	Home	1–0	Round of 16	(Pará) Paysandu (won 4–1 on aggregate)	Away	0–1
(Rio de Janeiro (state)) Flamengo (tied 2–2 on aggregate, won 3–1 on penalties)	Home	1–1	Quarter-finals	(São Paulo (state)) Palmeiras (tied 1–1 on aggregate, won 5–4 on penalties)	Away	1–0
(Rio de Janeiro (state)) Flamengo (tied 2–2 on aggregate, won 3–1 on penalties)	Away	1–1	Quarter-finals	(São Paulo (state)) Palmeiras (tied 1–1 on aggregate, won 5–4 on penalties)	Home	1–0
(Rio Grande do Sul) Grêmio (tied 2–2 on aggregate, won 5–4 on penalties)	Away	2–0	Semi-finals	(Minas Gerais) Cruzeiro (won 4–0 on aggregate)	Away	0–1
(Rio Grande do Sul) Grêmio (tied 2–2 on aggregate, won 5–4 on penalties)	Home	2–0	Semi-finals	(Minas Gerais) Cruzeiro (won 4–0 on aggregate)	Home	3–0

== Format ==
In the finals, the teams played a single-elimination tournament with the following rules:

- The finals were played on a home-and-away two-legged basis. The home-and-away teams for both legs were determined by a draw held on 5 September 2019 at the CBF headquarters in Rio de Janeiro, Brazil.
- If tied on aggregate, the away goals rule and extra time would not be used and the penalty shoot-out would be used to determine the winner. (Regulations Article 12.c).

== Matches ==
Jonathan and Bruno Nazário (Athletico Paranaense) and Natanael, Matheus Galdezani and Rodrigo Dourado (Internacional) were ruled out of the finals due to injuries. Thiago Heleno and Camacho (Athletico Paranaense) were suspended for a doping violation and could not play the finals.

Andrés D'Alessandro and William Pottker (Internacional) suffered injuries before the second leg. William Pottker was ruled out of the second match but D'Alessandro was substitute although he did not play.

=== First leg ===
Athletico Paranaense defeated Internacional 1–0 in the first leg. In the 57th minute, after a combination of Nikão, Marco Ruben and Bruno Guimarães, Ruben passed the ball to Bruno Guimarães. The pass was deflected by Rodrigo Moledo and Edenílson allowing Bruno Guimarães scored the winning goal with a shot inside the box.

11 September 2019
21:30 UTC−3

Athletico Paranaense (Paraná (state))	1–0	(Rio Grande do Sul) Internacional
Bruno Guimarães 57'	Report

Arena da Baixada, Curitiba
Attendance: 38,490
Referee: Raphael Claus (São Paulo)

**Athletico Paranaense**	**Internacional**

GK	1	(Brazil) Santos
RB	13	(Brazil) Khellven	(yellow card) 65'
CB	14	(Brazil) Robson Bambu
CB	4	(Brazil) Léo Pereira
LB	6	(Brazil) Márcio Azevedo
DM	5	(Brazil) Wellington (c)	(yellow card) 90+4'
CM	39	(Brazil) Bruno Guimarães
CM	18	(Brazil) Léo Cittadini		(substituted off) 56'
RW	11	(Brazil) Nikão	(yellow card) 41'
LW	7	(Brazil) Rony		(substituted off) 79'
CF	9	(Argentina) Marco Ruben		(substituted off) 66'
Substitutes:
GK	22	(Brazil) Léo
DF	23	(Brazil) Mádson
DF	30	(Brazil) Abner Felipe
DF	33	(Brazil) Lucas Halter
MF	3	(Argentina) Lucho González		(substituted on) 79'
MF	8	(Argentina) Tomás Andrade
MF	20	(Brazil) Matheus Rossetto
MF	26	(Brazil) Erick
MF	38	(Brazil) Thonny Anderson		(substituted on) 56'
FW	10	(Brazil) Marcelo Cirino		(substituted on) 66'
FW	17	(Argentina) Braian Romero
FW	28	(Brazil) Vitinho
Manager:
(Brazil) Tiago Nunes

GK	12	(Brazil) Marcelo Lomba
RB	2	(Brazil) Bruno
CB	4	(Brazil) Rodrigo Moledo
CB	15	(Argentina) Víctor Cuesta
LB	6	(Brazil) Uendel
DM	19	(Brazil) Rodrigo Lindoso
RM	8	(Brazil) Edenílson	(substituted off) 73'
LM	88	(Brazil) Patrick
AM	10	(Argentina) Andrés D'Alessandro (c)	(substituted off) 82'
AM	7	(Uruguay) Nicolás López	(substituted off) 63'
CF	9	(Peru) Paolo Guerrero
Substitutes:
GK	1	(Brazil) Danilo Fernandes
DF	31	(Brazil) Heitor
DF	37	(Brazil) Zeca
DF	44	(Brazil) Klaus
MF	16	(Brazil) Rithely
MF	29	(Argentina) Martín Sarrafiore
MF	33	(Brazil) Nonato	(substituted on) 73'
FW	11	(Brazil) Wellington Silva	(substituted on) 63'
FW	17	(Brazil) Neilton
FW	23	(Brazil) Rafael Sóbis	(substituted on) 82'
FW	77	(Brazil) Guilherme Parede
FW	99	(Brazil) William Pottker
Manager:
(Brazil) Odair Hellmann

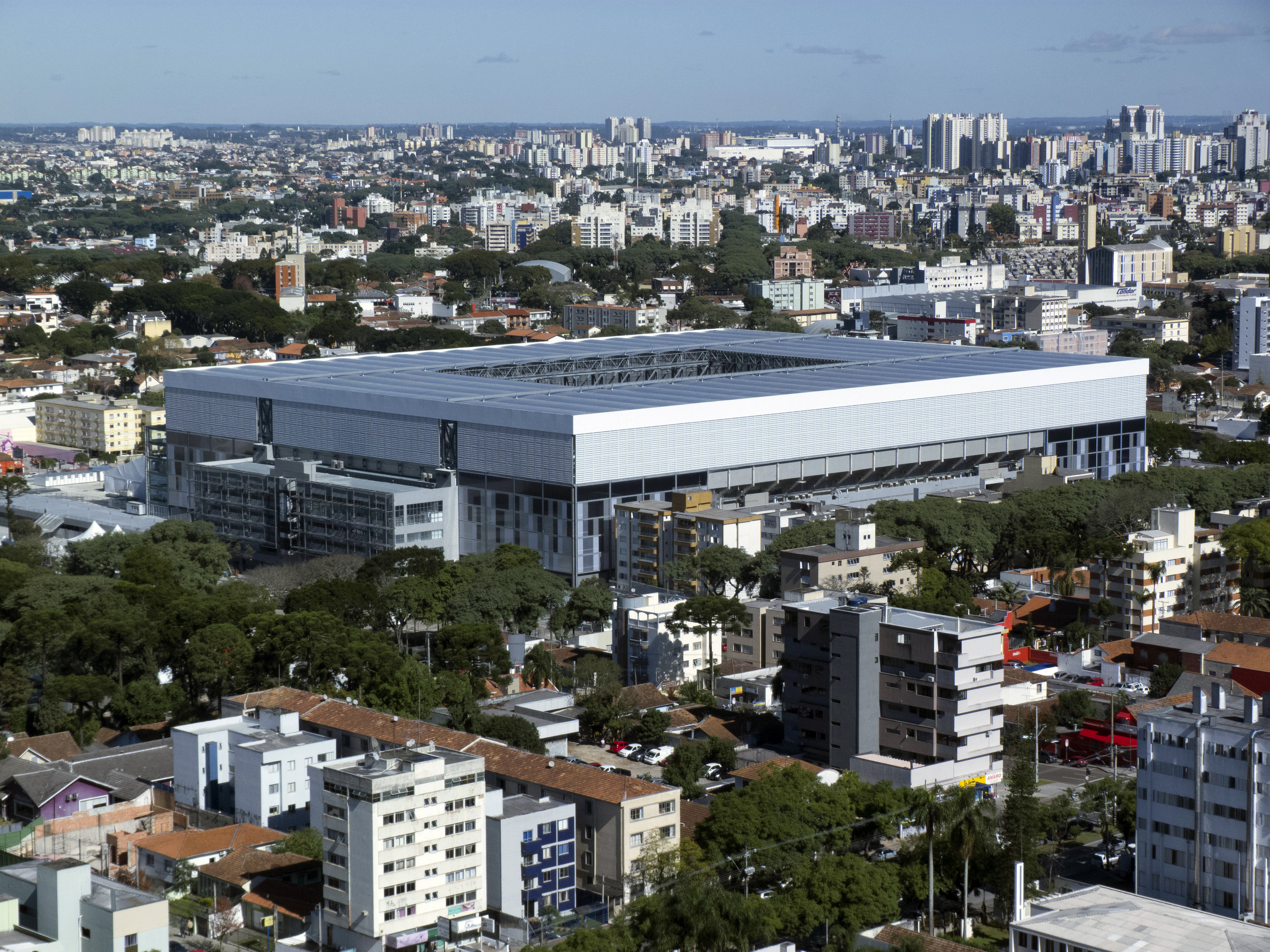
Arena da Baixada in Curitiba hosted the first leg.

Man of the Match:
(Brazil) Bruno Guimarães (Athletico Paranaense)

Assistant referees:
Rodrigo Figueiredo Henrique Corrêa (Rio de Janeiro)
Neuza Inês Back (São Paulo)
Fourth official:
Luiz Flávio de Oliveira (São Paulo)
Fifth official:
Fabrício Vilarinho da Silva (Goiás)
Video assistant referee:
Rodrigo Guarizo Ferreira do Amaral (São Paulo)
Assistant video assistant referees:
Caio Max Augusto Vieira (Rio Grande do Norte)
Fabrício Porfírio de Moura (São Paulo)

=== Second leg ===
In the second leg, Athletico Paranaense defeated Internacional 1–2. Léo Cittadini scored in the 24th minute after a play with Rony and Marco Ruben. Nicolás López equalized after Rodrigo Lindoso' shot off the post and Víctor Cuesta gained the rebound. During the injury time, Marcelo Cirino dribbled Edenílson, Rafael Sóbis and Rodrigo Lindoso before assist Rony, who scored the winning goal.

18 September 2019
21:30 UTC−3

Internacional (Rio Grande do Sul)	1–2	(Paraná (state)) Athletico Paranaense
López 31'	Report	Léo Cittadini 24'; Rony 90+6'

Estádio Beira-Rio, Porto Alegre
Attendance: 46,747
Referee: Wilton Sampaio (Goiás)

**Internacional**	**Athletico Paranaense**

GK	12	(Brazil) Marcelo Lomba (c)
RB	2	(Brazil) Bruno	(yellow card) 45'	(substituted off) 54'
CB	4	(Brazil) Rodrigo Moledo	(yellow card) 80'
CB	15	(Argentina) Víctor Cuesta
LB	6	(Brazil) Uendel
DM	19	(Brazil) Rodrigo Lindoso
RM	8	(Brazil) Edenílson
LM	88	(Brazil) Patrick		(substituted off) 46'
RW	11	(Brazil) Wellington Silva		(substituted off) 80'
LW	7	(Uruguay) Nicolás López	(yellow card) 8'
CF	9	(Peru) Paolo Guerrero
Substitutes:
GK	1	(Brazil) Danilo Fernandes
DF	20	(Brazil) Emerson Santos
DF	31	(Brazil) Heitor
DF	37	(Brazil) Zeca
DF	44	(Brazil) Klaus
MF	10	(Argentina) Andrés D'Alessandro
MF	16	(Brazil) Rithely
MF	29	(Argentina) Martín Sarrafiore
MF	33	(Brazil) Nonato		(substituted on) 54'
FW	17	(Brazil) Neilton
FW	23	(Brazil) Rafael Sóbis		(substituted on) 46'
FW	77	(Brazil) Guilherme Parede		(substituted on) 80'
Manager:
(Brazil) Odair Hellmann

GK	1	(Brazil) Santos
RB	13	(Brazil) Khellven		(substituted off) 60'
CB	14	(Brazil) Robson Bambu
CB	4	(Brazil) Léo Pereira
LB	6	(Brazil) Márcio Azevedo
DM	5	(Brazil) Wellington (c)	(yellow card) 49'
CM	39	(Brazil) Bruno Guimarães
CM	18	(Brazil) Léo Cittadini		(substituted off) 83'
RW	11	(Brazil) Nikão
LW	7	(Brazil) Rony
CF	9	(Argentina) Marco Ruben	(yellow card) 59'	(substituted off) 67'
Substitutes:
GK	22	(Brazil) Léo
DF	23	(Brazil) Mádson		(substituted on) 60'
DF	30	(Brazil) Abner Felipe
DF	33	(Brazil) Lucas Halter
MF	3	(Argentina) Lucho González		(substituted on) 83'
MF	8	(Argentina) Tomás Andrade
MF	20	(Brazil) Matheus Rossetto
MF	26	(Brazil) Erick
MF	38	(Brazil) Thonny Anderson
FW	10	(Brazil) Marcelo Cirino		(substituted on) 67'
FW	17	(Argentina) Braian Romero
FW	28	(Brazil) Vitinho
Manager:
(Brazil) Tiago Nunes

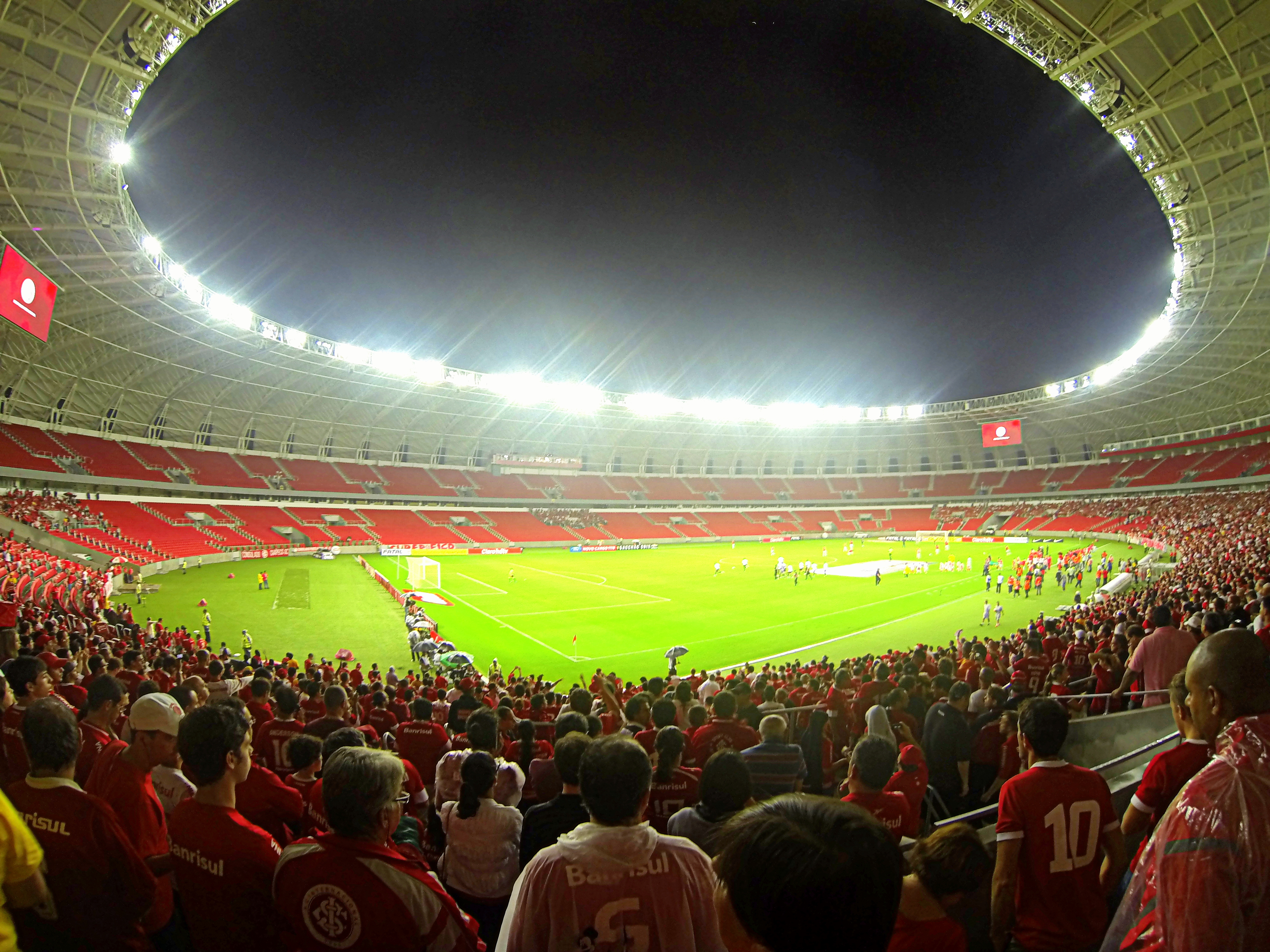
Estádio Beira-Rio in Porto Alegre hosted the second leg.

Man of the Match:
(Brazil) Rony (Athletico Paranaense)

Assistant referees:
Émerson Augusto de Carvalho (São Paulo)
Bruno Raphael Pires (Goiás)
Fourth official:
Flávio Rodrigues de Souza (São Paulo)
Fifth official:
Danilo Ricardo Simon Manis (São Paulo)
Video assistant referee:
Bráulio da Silva Machado (Santa Catarina)
Assistant video assistant referees:
Émerson de Almeida Ferreira (Minas Gerais)
Leone Carvalho Rocha (Goiás)

== See also ==
- 2019 Campeonato Brasileiro Série A
