= Isaque =

Isaque is a Portuguese given name, a variant of Isaac. Notable people with the name include:

- Isaque (footballer, born 1997), born Isaque Elias Brito
- Isaque (footballer, born 2007), born Isaque Severino Silva
- Isaque Bagwan, former Indian police officer
- Isaque Bahiense, Brazilian jiu-jitsu fighter
