= Juninho Valoura =

Brazilian footballer

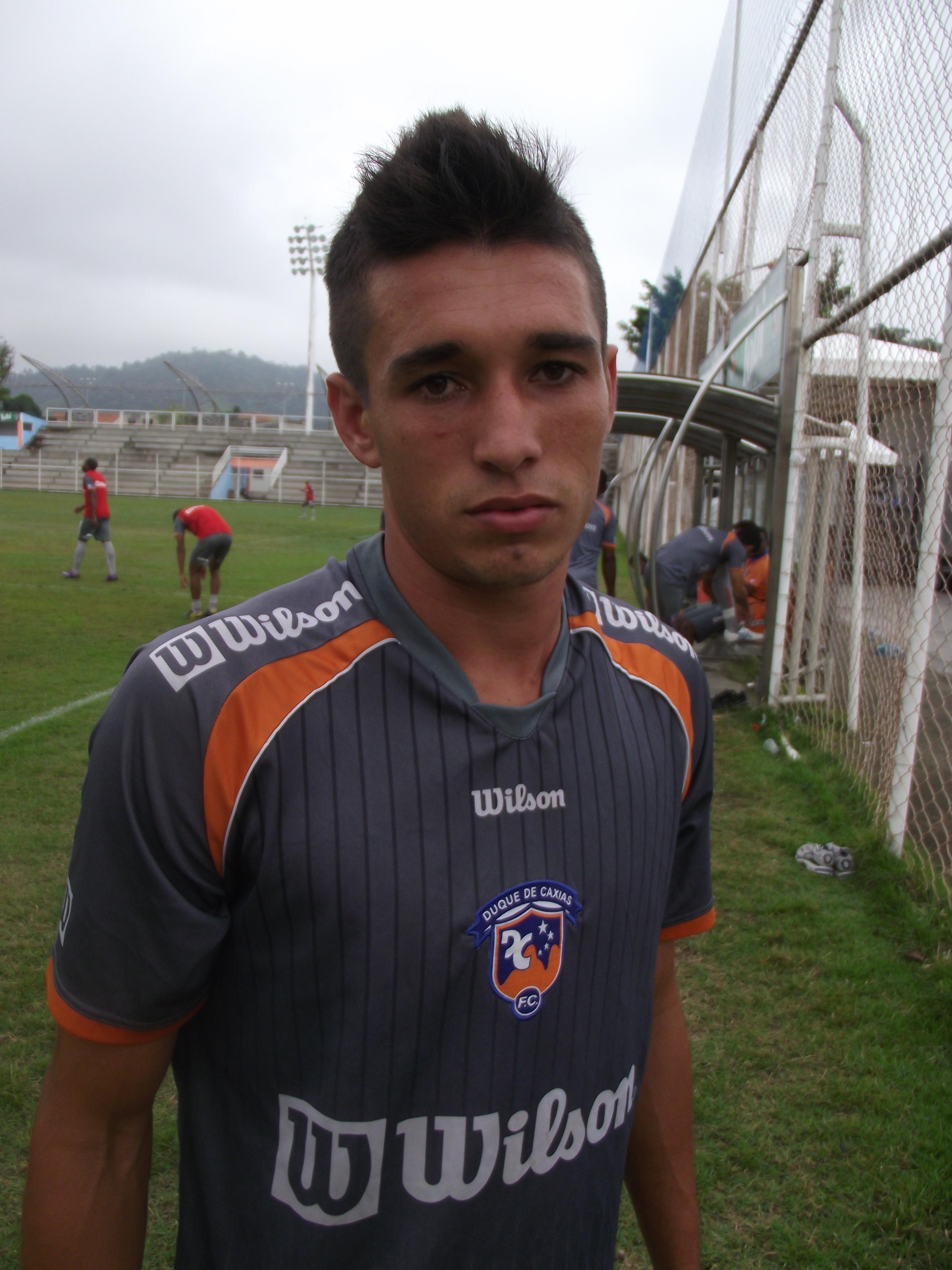

Personal information
- Full name: Paulo Roberto Valoura Júnior
- Date of birth: 20 March 1986 (age 40)
- Place of birth: Rio de Janeiro, Brazil
- Height: 1.75 m (5 ft 9 in)
- Position: Defensive midfielder

Team information
- Current team: CRB

Youth career
- 2005: Madureira
- 2006: America-RJ

Senior career*
Years	Team	Apps	(Gls)
2007	Serrano-RJ		
2007–2014	Duque de Caxias	153	(15)
2013	→ America Mineiro (loan)	20	(1)
2014	Tombense	15	(0)
2015	Macaé	51	(6)
2016–2019	Bahia	106	(16)
2018–2019	→ Ceará (loan)	53	(5)
2019	→ Fortaleza (loan)	32	(3)
2020–2021	Fortaleza	56	(5)
2021	→ América Mineiro (loan)	27	(3)
2022	América Mineiro	17	(0)
2022	→ CRB (loan)	12	(0)
2023–	CRB	18	(1)
- * Club domestic league appearances and goals as of 02:14, 6 February 2022 (UTC)

Paulo Roberto Valoura Júnior (born 20 March 1986), known as Juninho Valoura or just Juninho, is a Brazilian professional footballer who plays as a defensive midfielder for CRB.

== Club career ==
Born in Rio de Janeiro, Juninho started his senior career with neighbouring Serrano in 2007. Late in the year he moved to Duque de Caxias, and went on to feature regularly for the club in the following seven seasons, only split by a loan deal at América Mineiro in 2013.

In June 2014, Juninho opted not to renew his contract with Duque and signed for Tombense. After finishing the year as a starter and champion of the Série D, he agreed to a contract with Macaé.

One of the spotlights of the 2015 Série B, Juninho signed a contract with fellow league team Bahia. An undisputed starter for the campaign, he contributed with six league goals in 33 appearances as his side returned to the main category after two years.

On 14 May 2017, Juninho made his Série A debut at the age of 31, starting in a 6–2 home routing of Atlético Paranaense.

In May 2019, he was loaned to Fortaleza from Bahia until the end of the season.

== Career statistics ==
As of 5 February 2022

Club	Season	League			State League		Cup		Continental		Other		Total	
Club	Season	Division	Apps	Goals	Apps	Goals	Apps	Goals	Apps	Goals	Apps	Goals	Apps	Goals
Duque de Caxias	2008	Série C	24	3	3	0	—		—		6 (Note: Appearance(s) in Copa Rio)	0	33	3
Duque de Caxias	2009	Série B	27	2	13	1	—		—		—		40	3
Duque de Caxias	2010	Série B	19	0	17	2	—		—		—		36	2
Duque de Caxias	2011	Série B	12	0	14	4	—		—		—		26	4
Duque de Caxias	2012	Série C	19	3	14	0	—		—		—		33	4
Duque de Caxias	2014	Série C	0	0	15	3	0	0	—		—		15	3
Duque de Caxias	Subtotal		101	8	76	10	0	0	—		6	0	183	18
América Mineiro (loan)	2013	Série B	7	0	9	1	4	0	—		—		20	1
Tombense	2014	Série D	15	0	—		—		—		—		15	0
Macaé	2015	Série B	37	5	14	1	—		—		—		51	6
Bahia	2016	Série B	33	6	11	1	3	0	—		8 (Note: Appearance(s) in Copa do Nordeste)	4	55	11
Bahia	2017	Série A	28	2	11	1	1	0	—		11	2	51	5
Bahia	Subtotal		61	8	22	2	4	0	—		19	6	106	16
Ceará (loan)	2018	Série A	16	1	10	1	4	1	—		6	0	36	3
Ceará (loan)	2019	Série A	0	0	7	1	4	1	—		6	0	17	2
Ceará (loan)	Subtotal		16	1	17	2	8	2	—		12	0	53	5
Fortaleza (loan)	2019	Série A	32	3	—		—		—		—		32	3
Fortaleza	2020	Série A	32	3	5	1	2	0	2 (Note: Appearance(s) in Copa Sudamericana)	1	9	0	50	5
Fortaleza	2021	Série A	0	0	1	0	1	0	—		4	0	6	0
Fortaleza	Subtotal		32	3	6	1	3	0	2	1	13	0	56	5
América Mineiro (loan)	2021	Série A	25	3	2	0	—		—		—		27	3
América Mineiro	2022	Série A	0	0	3	0	0	0	0	0	—		3	0
Career total			326	31	149	17	19	2	2	1	50	6	546	57

== Honours ==
Tombense

- Campeonato Brasileiro Série D: 2014

Bahia

- Copa do Nordeste: 2017

Ceará

- Campeonato Cearense: 2018
