= Marcelo de Lima Henrique =

Brazilian football referee

Marcelo Henrique
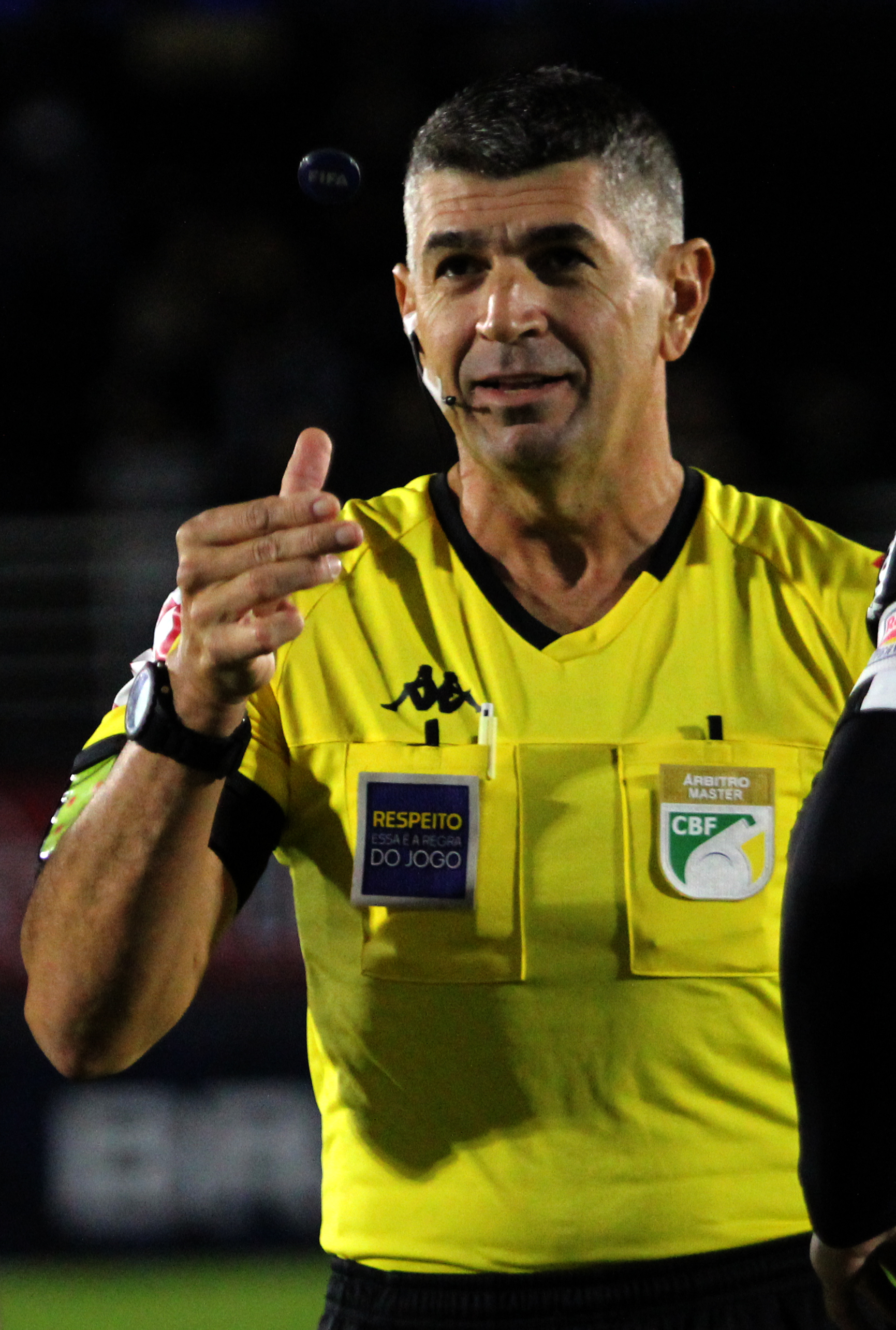
- Full name: Marcelo de Lima Henrique
- Born: 26 August 1971 (age 55); Rio de Janeiro, Brazil

Domestic
Years	League	Role

International
Years	League	Role
2008–2014	FIFA listed	Referee

Marcelo de Lima Henrique (born 26 August 1971 in Rio de Janeiro) is a Brazilian football referee. He refereed at 2014 FIFA World Cup qualifiers. In August 2022, he became the oldest referee in the Campeonato Brasileiro Série A. Marcelo was FIFA listed between 2008 and 2014. He served in the Brazilian navy before becoming a full-time referee.
