= 2021 São Paulo FC season =

São Paulo
2021 season
- Chairman: Julio Casares
- Manager: Hernán Crespo (until October 13); Rogério Ceni
- Stadium: Morumbi
- Campeonato Brasileiro Série A: 13th
- Campeonato Paulista: Winners
- Copa do Brasil: Quarter-finals
- Copa Libertadores: Quarter-finals
- Top goalscorer: League: Jonathan Calleri (5); All: Pablo (13)

The 2021 season is São Paulo's 92nd season in the club's history and their 61st in the top-flight of Brazilian football. Along with Série A, São Paulo will also compete in the Campeonato Paulista, Copa do Brasil and Copa Libertadores.

== First-team squad ==
As of 6 December 2021

Note: Flags indicate national team as defined under FIFA eligibility rules; some limited exceptions apply. Players may hold more than one non-FIFA nationality.

No.	Pos.	Nation	Player
1	GK	BRA	Tiago Volpi
2	DF	BRA	Igor Vinícius
3	DF	BRA	Bruno Alves
4	DF	BRA	Diego Costa
5	DF	ECU	Robert Arboleda
6	DF	BRA	Reinaldo (vice-captain)
8	MF	ARG	Martín Benítez (on loan from Independiente)
9	FW	BRA	Pablo
11	FW	BRA	Luciano
12	MF	BRA	Vitor Bueno
13	MF	BRA	Luan
14	MF	BRA	Liziero
15	MF	URU	Gabriel Neves (on loan from Nacional)
16	DF	BRA	Léo
17	MF	BRA	William
18	GK	BRA	Lucas Perri

No.	Pos.	Nation	Player
20	DF	COL	Luis Manuel Orejuela
21	MF	BRA	Gabriel Sara
22	DF	BRA	Miranda (captain)
23	FW	ITA	Eder
25	MF	BRA	Rodrigo Nestor
26	MF	BRA	Igor Gomes
27	FW	PAR	Antonio Galeano (on loan from Rubio Ñu)
30	FW	ARG	Jonathan Calleri (on loan from Deportivo Maldonado)
32	DF	BRA	Rodrigo
34	DF	BRA	Welington
37	MF	BRA	Talles Costa
40	GK	BRA	Thiago Couto
43	DF	BRA	Walce
47	FW	BRA	Marquinhos
55	MF	BRA	Rafael Silva
77	FW	ARG	Emiliano Rigoni

=== Youth players with first team numbers ===
Note: Flags indicate national team as defined under FIFA eligibility rules; some limited exceptions apply. Players may hold more than one non-FIFA nationality.

No.	Pos.	Nation	Player
24	GK	BRA	Arthur Gazze
28	FW	BRA	Juan
29	FW	BRA	João Adriano
30	DF	BRA	Thiagão (on loan from Coritiba)
33	GK	BRA	Young
35	DF	BRA	Lucas Beraldo
36	DF	BRA	Patryck
38	FW	BRA	Caio
39	FW	BRA	Vitinho

No.	Pos.	Nation	Player
41	DF	BRA	Luizão
42	DF	BRA	Anílson
45	DF	BRA	Nathan
46	MF	BRA	Palmberg
48	MF	BRA	Pedrinho
49	MF	BRA	Gabriel Falcão
50	DF	BRA	Caio Felipe
—	FW	URU	Facundo Milán

=== Other players under contract ===
Note: Flags indicate national team as defined under FIFA eligibility rules; some limited exceptions apply. Players may hold more than one non-FIFA nationality.

No.	Pos.	Nation	Player
44	FW	BRA	Caíque

=== Out on loan ===
Note: Flags indicate national team as defined under FIFA eligibility rules; some limited exceptions apply. Players may hold more than one non-FIFA nationality.

No.	Pos.	Nation	Player
—	GK	BRA	Jean (at Cerro Porteño until 31 December 2021)
—	GK	BRA	Dênis Júnior (at Bahia until 31 December 2021)
—	DF	BRA	Lucas Kal (at América Mineiro until 31 March 2022)
—	MF	BRA	Hudson (at Fluminense until 31 December 2021)
—	MF	BRA	Bruno Tatavitto (at São Bernardo until 31 January 2022)
—	MF	BRA	Marcos Júnior (at Ponte Preta until 31 December 2021)

No.	Pos.	Nation	Player
—	MF	BRA	Tchê Tchê (at Atlético Mineiro until 31 May 2022)
—	MF	BRA	Helinho (at Red Bull Bragantino until 31 December 2021)
—	FW	COL	Santiago Tréllez (at Sport Recife until 31 December 2021)
—	FW	BRA	Danilo Gomes (at Cuiabá until 31 December 2021)
—	FW	BRA	Paulinho (at Juventude until 31 December 2021)
—	FW	BRA	Jonas Toró (at Atlético Goianiense until 31 December 2021)

== Retired numbers ==
- 01 – (Brazil) Rogério Ceni, Goalkeeper (1990–2015)

== Transfers ==
=== Transfers in ===
Entry date	Position	No.	Player	From club	Fee	Ref.
11 March 2021	DF	20	(Colombia) Luis Manuel Orejuela	Cruzeiro	Undisclosed	
17 March 2021	DF	22	(Brazil) Miranda	(China) Jiangsu	Free transfer	
26 March 2021	FW	23	(Italy) Éder	(China) Jiangsu	Free transfer	
30 March 2021	MF	17	(Brazil) William	(Mexico) Deportivo Toluca	Free transfer	
24 May 2021	FW	77	(Argentina) Emiliano Rigoni	(Russia) Zenit Saint Petersburg	Undisclosed	

=== Loans in ===
Start date	End date	Position	No.	Player	From club	Fee	Ref.
17 February 2021	31 December 2021	FW	28	(Brazil) Bruno Rodrigues	Tombense	None	
6 April 2021	31 December 2021	MF	8	(Argentina) Martín Benítez	(Argentina) Independiente	None	
30 August 2021	31 December 2022	MF	15	(Uruguay) Gabriel Neves	(Uruguay) Nacional	None	
30 August 2021	31 December 2022	FW	30	(Argentina) Jonathan Calleri	(Uruguay) Deportivo Maldonado	None	

=== Transfers out ===
Exit date	Position	No.	Player	To club	Fee	Ref.
26 February 2021	DF		(Spain) Juanfran	Unattached	End of contract	
2 March 2021	MF		(Brazil) Calebe	Atlético Mineiro	R$ 400K	
12 March 2021	DF		(Brazil) Weverson	Red Bull Bragantino	R$ 2M	
30 March 2021	FW		(Uruguay) Gonzalo Carneiro	Unattached	End of contract	
3 May 2021	FW		(Brazil) Gabriel Novaes	Red Bull Bragantino	R$ 6M	
8 July 2021	FW	28	(Brazil) Bruno Rodrigues	(Portugal) Famalicão	Loan terminated	
17 July 2021	MF	15	(Brazil) Hernanes	Sport Recife	Contract terminated by mutual consent	
4 August 2021	MF	30	(Brazil) Everton Felipe	Sport Recife	Contract terminated by mutual consent	
31 August 2021	DF		(Brazil) Júnior Tavares	Náutico	Contract terminated by mutual consent	
31 August 2021	FW		(Brazil) Marcos Calazans	Unattached	Contract terminated by mutual consent	
16 September 2021	DF	10	(Brazil) Dani Alves	Unattached	Contract terminated by mutual consent	
8 November 2021	FW	–	(Brazil) Paulinho	(Ukraine) Metalist	R$7,0M	
23 November 2021	FW	7	(Ecuador) João Rojas	Unattached	Contract terminated by mutual consent	

=== Loans out ===
Start date	End date	Position	No.	Player	To club	Fee	Ref.
18 February 2021	31 May 2021	MF		(Brazil) Rafael Silva	Santo André	None	
3 March 2021	31 December 2021	DF		(Brazil) Júnior Tavares	Sport Recife	None	
3 March 2021	31 December 2021	MF		(Brazil) Marcos Júnior	Ponte Preta	None	
9 March 2021	31 December 2021	FW		(Brazil) Jonas Toró	Sport Recife	None	
12 March 2021	31 December 2021	GK		(Brazil) Dênis Júnior	Bahia	None	
19 March 2021	31 December 2021	MF		(Brazil) Hudson	Fluminense	None	
24 March 2021	31 December 2021	FW		(Colombia) Santiago Tréllez	Sport Recife	None	
26 March 2021	31 December 2021	GK		(Brazil) Jean	(Paraguay) Cerro Porteño	R$ 1M	
6 April 2021	31 May 2022	MF	8	(Brazil) Tchê Tchê	Atlético Mineiro	None	
9 June 2021	31 December 2021	MF		(Brazil) Danilo Gomes	Cuiabá	None	
9 June 2021	31 March 2022	DF		(Brazil) Lucas Kal	América Mineiro	None	
14 June 2021	31 December 2021	FW	38	(Brazil) Paulinho	Juventude	None	
16 July 2021	31 December 2021	FW		(Brazil) Jonas Toró	Atlético Goianiense	None	
18 July 2021	30 November 2021	FW		(Brazil) Miguel Augusto	Portuguesa	None	
30 July 2021	30 November 2021	MF		(Brazil) Bruno Tatavitto	São Bernardo	None	

== Statistics ==
=== Overall ===
Games played	70 (16 Campeonato Paulista, 6 Copa do Brasil, 10 Copa Libertadores, 38 Campeonato Brasileiro)
Games won	29 (11 Campeonato Paulista, 3 Copa do Brasil, 4 Copa Libertadores, 11 Campeonato Brasileiro)
Games drawn	24 (4 Campeonato Paulista, 1 Copa do Brasil, 4 Copa Libertadores, 15 Campeonato Brasileiro)
Games lost	17 (1 Campeonato Paulista, 2 Copa do Brasil, 2 Copa Libertadores, 12 Campeonato Brasileiro)
Goals scored	101
Goals conceded	68
Goal difference	+33
Best results (goal difference)	9–1 (H) v 4 de Julho - Copa do Brasil - 2021.06.08
Worst result (goal difference)	1–5 (A) v Flamengo - Série A - 2021.07.25
Top scorer	Pablo (13 goals)

Source: São Paulo FC

=== Goalscorers ===
Place	Position	Nationality	Number	Name	Campeonato Paulista	Copa Libertadores	Série A	Copa do Brasil	Total
1	FW	(Brazil)	9	Pablo	5	1	3	4	13
2	MF	(Argentina)	77	Emiliano Rigoni	0	2	4	5	11
3	MF	(Brazil)	21	Gabriel Sara	4	0	4	2	10
=	FW	(Brazil)	11	Luciano	4	0	4	2	10
4	FW	(Brazil)	12	Vitor Bueno	3	2	1	0	6
5	FW	(Brazil) (Italy)	23	Éder	1	1	1	2	5
=	FW	(Argentina)	30	Jonathan Calleri	0	0	5	0	5
6	FW	(Ecuador)	7	Joao Rojas	3	1	0	0	4
=	MF	(Argentina)	8	Martín Benítez	0	1	2	1	4
=	DF	(Brazil)	6	Reinaldo	1	1	2	0	4
=	DF	(Ecuador)	5	Robert Arboleda	3	0	1	0	4
7	MF	(Brazil)	26	Igor Gomes	1	0	2	0	3
=	MF	(Brazil)	13	Luan	1	2	0	0	3
8	DF	(Brazil)	3	Bruno Alves	0	1	0	1	2
=	MF	(Brazil)	14	Liziero	1	0	1	0	2
=	DF	(Brazil)	2	Igor Vinícius	2	0	0	0	2
9	FW	(Paraguay)	27	Antonio Galeano	1	0	0	0	1
=	MF	(Brazil)	10	Dani Alves	1	0	0	0	1
=	DF	(Colombia)	20	Luis Manuel Orejuela	0	1	0	0	1
=	FW	(Brazil)	47	Marquinhos	0	1	0	0	1
=	DF	(Brazil)	22	Miranda	1	0	0	0	1
=	DF	(Brazil)	32	Rodrigo	1	0	0	0	1
=	MF	(Brazil)	25	Rodrigo Nestor	1	0	0	0	1
=	MF	(Brazil)	8	Tchê Tchê	1	0	0	0	1
=	DF	(Brazil)	34	Welington	1	0	0	0	1
				Own goals	2	0	1	1	4
				Total	38	14	31	18	101

=== Managers performance ===
Name	Nationality	From	To	P	W	D	L	GF	GA	Avg%
Hernán Crespo	Argentina	28 February 2021	11 October 2021	57	24	21	12	90	54	54%
Rogério Ceni	Brazil	14 October 2021	9 December 2021	13	5	3	5	11	14	46%

== Competitions ==
=== Overview ===
Competition	First match	Last match	Starting round	Final position	Record							
Competition	First match	Last match	Starting round	Final position	Pld	W	D	L	GF	GA	GD	Win %
Série A	29 May 2021	9 December 2021	Matchday 1	13th	38	11	15	12	31	39	−8	28.95
Campeonato Paulista	28 February 2021	23 May 2021	First stage	Winners	16	11	4	1	38	11	+27	68.75
Copa do Brasil	1 June 2021	15 September 2021	Third round	Quarter-finals	6	3	1	2	18	10	+8	50.00
Copa Libertadores	20 April 2021	17 August 2021	Group stage	Quarter-finals	10	4	4	2	14	8	+6	40.00
Total					70	29	24	17	101	68	+33	41.43

=== Campeonato Paulista ===
==== Group B ====
Pos	Team	Pld	W	D	L	GF	GA	GD	Pts	Qualification or relegation
1	São Paulo	12	8	3	1	28	9	+19	27	Knockout stage
2	Ferroviária	12	6	3	3	20	12	+8	21	Knockout stage
3	Ponte Preta	12	4	1	7	13	16	−3	13	Troféu do Interior
4	São Bento (R)	12	1	6	5	8	14	−6	9	Relegation to Série A2

Source: Soccerway
(R) Relegated

==== Matches ====
28 February 2021 1	São Paulo	1–1	Botafogo	São Paulo
19:00 (UTC−3)	Arboleda 74'	Report	(yellow card) 28' Marlon; 47' Eduardo; (yellow card) 80' João Pedro	Stadium: Morumbi; Attendance: 0 Referee: Salim Fende Chavez

3 March 2021 2	Inter de Limeira	0–4	São Paulo	Limeira
17:00 (UTC−3)	Lucas Batatinha (yellow card) 17'; Thiaguinho (yellow card) 38' (yellow-red card) 41'; Léo (yellow card) 56'; Igor Henrique (yellow card) 65'; Tharlles (yellow card) 74'; Thalisson (yellow card) 89'	Report	4' Gabriel; (yellow card) 33' Luan; 62' Pablo; 72' Luciano; (yellow card) 90+1' Dani Alves; 90+2' (pen.) Joao Rojas	Stadium: Limeirão; Attendance: 0 Referee: Flavio Rodrigues de Souza

6 March 2021 3	São Paulo	4–0	Santos	São Paulo
19:00 (UTC−3)	Gabriel 49'; Luan 73' (o.g.); Pablo (yellow card) 52', (goal) 75'; Tchê Tchê 87'	Report	(yellow card) 74' Soteldo	Stadium: Morumbi; Attendance: 0 Referee: Luiz Flavio de Oliveira

13 March 2021 4	Novorizontino	2–1	São Paulo	Novo Horizonte
16:30 (UTC−3)	Cléo Silva 45+2'; Guilherme 82'	Report	55' Joao Rojas	Stadium: Estádio Dr. Jorge Ismael de Biasi; Attendance: 0 Referee: Edina Alves Batista

10 April 2021 11	São Paulo	5–1	São Caetano	São Paulo
20:00 (UTC−3)	Arboleda 4'; Rodrigo Nestor 20'; Reinaldo 29'; Dani Alves 42'; Eder 75'	Report	31' Guilherme; (yellow card) 32' Ângelo Neto; (yellow card) 86' Daciel; (yellow card) 90+3' Warian	Stadium: Morumbi; Attendance: 0 Referee: Vinicius Gonçalves Dias Araujo

12 April 2021 7	São Paulo	1–0	Bragantino	São Paulo
20:00 (UTC−3)	Reinaldo (yellow card) 24'; Dani Alves (yellow card) 60'; Léo (yellow card) 68'; Léo Ortiz 71' (o.g.); Éder (yellow card) 78'; Luciano (yellow card) 84'	Report	(yellow card) 66' Tomás Cuello; (yellow card) 90+5' Jan Hurtado	Stadium: Morumbi; Attendance: 0 Referee: Flávio Rodrigues de Souza

14 April 2021 9	São Paulo	3–2	Guarani	São Paulo
21:30 (UTC−3)	Welington 45'; Igor Gomes 50'; Vitor Bueno 84'	Report	10' Airton; (yellow card) 21' Rodrigo Andrade; 71' Bruno Sávio	Stadium: Morumbi; Attendance: 0 Referee: Salim Fende Chavez

16 April 2021 5	Palmeiras	0–1	São Paulo	São Paulo
22:00 (UTC−3)	Felipe Melo (yellow card) 59'; Fabinho (yellow card) 73'	Report	62' Pablo; (yellow card) 83' Rodrigo Nestor	Stadium: Allianz Parque; Attendance: 0 Referee: Raphael Claus

23 April 2021 6	São Paulo	2–0	Santo André	São Paulo
20:00 (UTC−3)	Luciano (yellow card) 5'; Joao Rojas 9'; Rodrigo Nestor (yellow card) 18'; Vitor Bueno 54'	Report	(yellow card) 7' Fraga; (yellow card) 56' Rodrigo Fagundes	Stadium: Morumbi; Attendance: 0 Referee: Luiz Flavio de Oliveira

25 April 2021 8	Ituano	0–3	São Paulo	Itu
22:15 (UTC−3)	Bruno Lima (yellow card) 25'; Pacheco (yellow card) 35'; Jeferson (red card) 57'; Gabriel Taliari (red card) 76'	Report	8' (pen.) Rodrigo; (yellow card) 10' Léo; 22' Igor Vinícius; 74' Galeano	Stadium: Estádio Novelli Júnior; Attendance: 0 Referee: Raphael Claus

2 May 2021 10	Corinthians	2–2	São Paulo	São Paulo
22:15 (UTC−3)	Luan 40', (yellow card) 58'; Mosquito 84'; Raul Gustavo (yellow card) 87'; Ramiro (yellow card) 88'; João Victor (yellow card) 94'	Report	14' Miranda; (yellow card) 87' Benítez; (yellow card) 88', (goal) 96' (pen.) Luciano	Stadium: Neo Química Arena; Attendance: 0 Referee: Flávio Rodrigues de Souza

9 May 2021 12	Mirassol	1–1	São Paulo	Mirassol
16:00 (UTC−3)	Samuel Santos 16'; Sousa (yellow card) 21'; Daniel (yellow card) 47'; Eduardo Fernandes (yellow card) 90+1'	Report	29' Vitor Bueno; (yellow card) 90' Talles Costa	Stadium: Estádio José Maria de Campos Maia; Attendance: 0 Referee: Thiago Duarte Peixoto

==== Quarter-final ====
14 May 2021 Single match	São Paulo	4–2	Ferroviária	São Paulo
21:30 (UTC−3)	Gabriel 29'; Liziero 34', (yellow card) 71'; Igor Vinícius 52'; Miranda (yellow card) 54'; Pablo 65'	Report	43' Renato Cajá; (yellow card) 62' (yellow-red card) 89' Yuri; (yellow card) 69' Guilherme Bala; 84' Bruno Mezenga	Stadium: Morumbi; Attendance: 0 Referee: Salim Fende Chavez

==== Semi-final ====
16 May 2021 Single match	São Paulo	4–0	Mirassol	São Paulo
20:30 (UTC−3)	Robert Arboleda 45'; Pablo 50'; Gabriel 57'; Luciano 74'	Report	(yellow card) 61' Neto Moura; (yellow card) 81' Daniel	Stadium: Morumbi; Attendance: 0 Referee: Luiz Flávio de Oliveira

==== Final ====
20 May 2021 First leg	Palmeiras	0–0	São Paulo	São Paulo
22:00 (UTC−3)	Rony (yellow card) 27'	Report	(yellow card) 79' Miranda	Stadium: Allianz Parque; Attendance: 0 Referee: Flávio Rodrigues de Souza

23 May 2021 Second leg	São Paulo	2–0 (2–0 agg.)	Palmeiras	São Paulo
16:00 (UTC−3)	Liziero (yellow card) 10'; Igor Gomes (yellow card) 25'; Luan 36'; Bruno Alves (yellow card) 68'; Luciano 77'	Report	(yellow card) 32' Renan; (yellow card) 34' Lucas Lima; (yellow card) 70' Wesley	Stadium: Morumbi; Attendance: 0 Referee: Raphael Claus

=== Copa Libertadores ===
The draw for the group stage was held on 9 April 2021, 12:00 PYST (UTC−4), at the CONMEBOL Convention Centre in Luque, Paraguay.

Pos	Team	Pld	W	D	L	GF	GA	GD	Pts	Qualification	RAC	SPA	CRI	REN
1	(Argentina) Racing	6	4	2	0	9	2	+7	14	Round of 16	—	0–0	2–1	3–0
2	(Brazil) São Paulo	6	3	2	1	9	2	+7	11	Round of 16	0–1	—	3–0	2–0
3	(Peru) Sporting Cristal	6	1	1	4	3	10	−7	4	Copa Sudamericana	0–2	0–3	—	2–0
4	(Uruguay) Rentistas	6	0	3	3	2	9	−7	3		1–1	1–1	0–0	—

Source: CONMEBOL
Rules for classification: 1) Points; 2) Goal difference; 3) Goals scored; 4) Away goals scored; 5) CONMEBOL ranking.

20 April 2021 1	Sporting Cristal (Peru)	0–3	(Brazil) São Paulo	Lima, Peru
21:30 UTC−3	Horacio Calcaterra (yellow card) 41'; Jhilmar Lora (yellow card) 90+4'	Report	17' Luan; (yellow card) 43' Bruno Alves; 60' Martín Benítez; (yellow card) 68' (yellow-red card) 90' Léo; 81' Éder	Stadium: Estadio Alberto Gallardo; Attendance: 0 Referee: Andrés Cunha (Uruguay)

29 April 2021 2	São Paulo (Brazil)	2–0	(Uruguay) Rentistas	São Paulo, Brazil
21:00 UTC−3	Pablo 38'; Reinaldo (yellow card) 73', (goal) 90' (pen.)	Report	(yellow card) 39' (yellow-red card) 51' Agustín Acosta; (yellow card) 56' Francisco Duarte; (yellow card) 89' Mario García	Stadium: Morumbi; Attendance: 0 Referee: Nicolás Gamboa (Chile)

5 May 2021 3	Racing (Argentina)	0–0	(Brazil) São Paulo	Avellaneda, Argentina
19:00 UTC−3	Juan José Cáceres (yellow card) 27'; Joaquín Novillo (yellow card) 32'; Leonel Miranda (yellow card) 64'	Report	(yellow card) 37' Luan; (yellow card) 47' Bruno Alves; (yellow card) 65' Reinaldo; (red card) 80' William; (yellow card) 86' Igor Vinícius	Stadium: Estadio Presidente Perón; Attendance: 0 Referee: Piero Maza Gomez (Chile)

12 May 2021 4	Rentistas (Uruguay)	1–1	(Brazil) São Paulo	Montevideo, Uruguay
19:00 UTC−3	Martín González 13'; Joaquín Sosa (yellow card) 23'; Jonathan Urretaviscaya (yellow card) 65'	Report	4' Luis Manuel Orejuela; (yellow card) 32' Welington; (yellow card) 45' Diego Costa; (penalty missed) 47' Vitor Bueno; (yellow card) 78' Rodrigo	Stadium: Estadio Centenario; Attendance: 0 Referee: José Argote Vega (Venezuela)

18 May 2021 5	São Paulo (Brazil)	0–1	(Argentina) Racing	São Paulo, Brazil
21:30 UTC−3	Welington (yellow card) 26'; Rodrigo (yellow card) 26'	Report	(yellow card) 10' Fabricio Domínguez; 28' Joaquín Novillo; (yellow card) 85' Enzo Copetti; (yellow card) 89' Gabriel Arias	Stadium: Morumbi; Attendance: 0 Referee: Jesús Valenzuela Sáez (Venezuela)

25 May 2021 6	São Paulo (Brazil)	3–0	(Peru) Sporting Cristal	São Paulo, Brazil
21:30 UTC−3	Bruno Alves 25', (yellow card) 45'; Joao Rojas 68'; Vitor Bueno 70'	Report	(yellow card) 41' Jhilmar Lora; (yellow card) 73' Horacio Calcaterra	Stadium: Morumbi; Attendance: 0 Referee: Wilmar Alexander Rodán Pérez (Colombia)

==== Round of 16 ====
The draw for the round of 16 was held on 1 June 2021.

13 July 2021 First leg	São Paulo (Brazil)	1–1	(Argentina) Racing	São Paulo, Brazil
21:30 UTC−3	Vitor Bueno 35'; Diego Costa (yellow card) 40'; Robert Arboleda (yellow card) 47'; Lucas Perri (yellow card) 78'	Report	(yellow card) 14' Eugenio Mena; 45+1' Enzo Copetti; (yellow card) 77' Leonardo Sigali; (yellow card) 89' Javier Correa; (yellow card) 90+2' Matías Rojas	Stadium: Morumbi; Attendance: 0 Referee: Jhon Alexander Ospina Londoño (Colombia)

20 July 2021 Second leg	Racing (Argentina)	1–3 (2–4 agg.)	(Brazil) São Paulo	Avellaneda, Argentina
21:30 UTC−3	Javier Correa 63'; Leonel Miranda (yellow card) 73'	Report	(yellow card) 12' Léo; 44', 57' Emiliano Rigoni; 48' Marquinhos	Stadium: Estadio Presidente Perón; Attendance: 0 Referee: Gustavo Tejera (Uruguay)

==== Quarter-finals ====
10 August 2021 First leg	São Paulo (Brazil)	1–1	(Brazil) Palmeiras	São Paulo, Brazil
21:30 UTC−3	Dani Alves (yellow card) 51'; Luan 54'	Report	(yellow card) 47' Renan; 74' Patrick de Paula	Stadium: Morumbi; Attendance: 0 Referee: Néstor Pitana (Argentina)

17 August 2021 Second leg	Palmeiras (Brazil)	3–0 (4–1 agg.)	(Brazil) São Paulo	São Paulo, Brazil
21:30 UTC−3	Raphael Veiga 10'; Dudu 67'; Patrick de Paula 78'	Report	(yellow card) 41' Arboleda; (yellow card) 71' Dani Alves; (red card) 82' Vitor Bueno	Stadium: Allianz Parque; Attendance: 0 Referee: Wilmar Roldán (Colombia)

=== Série A ===
==== League table ====
Pos	Team	Pld	W	D	L	GF	GA	GD	Pts	Qualification or relegation
11	Ceará	38	11	17	10	39	38	+1	50	Qualification for Copa Sudamericana group stage
12	Internacional	38	12	12	14	44	42	+2	48	Qualification for Copa Sudamericana group stage
13	São Paulo	38	11	15	12	31	39	−8	48	Qualification for Copa Sudamericana group stage
14	Athletico Paranaense	38	13	8	17	41	45	−4	47	Qualification for Copa Libertadores group stage (Note: Athletico Paranaense qualified for the Copa Libertadores group stage by winning the 2021 Copa Sudamericana.)
15	Cuiabá	38	10	17	11	34	37	−3	47	Qualification for Copa Sudamericana group stage

Source: CBF
Rules for classification: 1) points; 2) wins; 3) goal difference; 4) goals scored; 5) head-to-head results (only between two teams); 6) fewest red cards; 7) fewest yellow cards; 8) drawing of lots.

==== Results summary ====
Overall								Home						Away					
Pld	W	D	L	GF	GA	GD	Pts	W	D	L	GF	GA	GD	W	D	L	GF	GA	GD
38	11	15	12	31	39	−8	48	7	9	3	18	15	+3	4	6	9	13	24	−11

==== Results by round ====
Round	1	2	3	4	5	6	7	8	9	10	11	12	13	14	15	16	17	18	19	20	21	22	23	24	25	26	27	28	29	30	31	32	33	34	35	36	37	38
Ground	H	A	A	H	A	H	A	A	H	A	H	H	A	H	A	H	A	A	H	A	H	H	A	H	A	H	H	A	H	A	A	H	A	H	A	H	H	A
Result	D	L	L	D	L	D	D	D	L	W	W	L	L	D	W	W	W	D	D	L	W	D	D	D	D	D	W	L	W	L	D	L	W	D	L	W	W	L
Position	12	15	17	16	18	17	17	17	17	16	14	15	17	17	16	14	12	12	12	16	12	13	13	14	13	13	12	13	12	14	14	15	14	14	14	14	13	13

Postponed

Source: CBF.com

==== Matches ====
The league fixtures were announced on 24 March 2021.

29 May 2021 1	São Paulo	0–0	Fluminense	São Paulo
21:00 UTC−3	Reinaldo (yellow card) 13'	Report	(penalty missed) 29' Nenê; (yellow card) 37' Abel Hernández; (yellow card) 69' Yago Felipe	Stadium: Morumbi; Attendance: 0 Referee: Rodolpho Toski Marques

5 June 2021 2	Atlético Goianiense	2–0	São Paulo	Goiânia
19:00 UTC−3	Éder 23'; Natanael (yellow card) 29'; Willian Maranhão (yellow card) 70'; Lucão (yellow card) 76'; João Paulo 79'; Janderson (yellow card) 82'	Report	(yellow card) 13' Igor Vinícius; (yellow card) 69' Léo; (yellow card) 82' Reinaldo; (yellow card) 84' Rodrigo Nestor; (yellow card) 89' Tiago Volpi	Stadium: Estádio Antônio Accioly; Attendance: 0 Referee: Diego Pombo Lopez

13 June 2021 3	Atlético Mineiro	1–0	São Paulo	Belo Horizonte
16:00 UTC−3	Jair 17'	Report	(yellow card) 41' Bruno Alves	Stadium: Mineirão; Attendance: 0 Referee: Anderson Daronco

16 June 2021 4	São Paulo	1–1	Chapecoense	São Paulo
19:00 UTC−3	Éder 13'; Rodrigo Nestor (red card) 41'; Liziero (yellow card) 66'; Luciano (yellow card) 89'	Report	(yellow card) 65' Anselmo Ramon; 70' Kaio Nunes; (yellow card) 90+5' Ravanelli	Stadium: Morumbi; Attendance: 0 Referee: Dyorgines José Padovani Andrade

20 June 2021 5	Santos	2–0	São Paulo	Santos
18:15 UTC−3	Marinho 27'; Gabriel Pirani 44'; Kaio Jorge (yellow card) 45+2'; Vinicius Zanocelo (yellow card) 90+6'	Report	(yellow card) 49' Reinaldo; (yellow card) 61' Gabriel Sara; (yellow card) 85' Igor Vinícius; (yellow card) 90+10' Martín Benítez	Stadium: Vila Belmiro; Attendance: 0 Referee: Sávio Pereira

23 June 2021 6	São Paulo	2–2	Cuiabá	São Paulo
19:00 UTC−3	Martín Benítez 18'; Welington (yellow card) 21'; Gabriel Sara 43'	Report	23' Rafael Gava; 39' Élton; (yellow card) 46' João Lucas	Stadium: Morumbi; Attendance: 0 Referee: Ricardo Marques Ribeiro

27 June 2021 7	Ceará	1–1	São Paulo	Fortaleza
20:30 UTC−3	Jorginho 23', (yellow card) 26'; Saulo Mineiro (yellow card) 45+1'; Gabriel Lacerda 68'; Jael 81'	Report	(yellow card) 26' Reinaldo; (yellow card) 28' Hernanes; 52' (o.g.) Gabriel Dias; (yellow card) 53' Éder; (yellow card) 77' Martín Benítez; (yellow card) 90+1' Welington	Stadium: Arena Castelão; Attendance: 0 Referee: Felipe Fernandes de Lima

30 June 2021 8	Corinthians	0–0	São Paulo	São Paulo
21:30 UTC−3	Mateus Vital (yellow card) 46'	Report	(yellow card) 67' Liziero	Stadium: Neo Química Arena; Attendance: 0 Referee: Leandro Vuaden

4 July 2021 9	São Paulo	1–2	Red Bull Bragantino	São Paulo
18:15 UTC−3	Emiliano Rigoni 26'; Luan (yellow card) 61'	Report	(yellow card) 53' Lucas Evangelista; (yellow card) 61' Bruno Praxedes; 63' Alerrandro; 75' Artur	Stadium: Morumbi; Attendance: 0 Referee: Anderson Daronco

7 July 2021 10	Internacional	0–2	São Paulo	Porto Alegre
21:30 UTC−3	Paulo Victor (yellow card) 25'; Rodrigo Lindoso (yellow card) 88'	Report	2' Emiliano Rigoni; (yellow card) 45+4' Bruno Alves; 54', (yellow card) 71' Igor Gomes; (yellow card) 79' Léo	Stadium: Estádio Beira-Rio; Attendance: 0 Referee: Bruno Arleu de Araújo

10 July 2021 11	São Paulo	1–0	Bahia	São Paulo
19:00 UTC−3	Liziero 90+2'	Report	(yellow card) 73' Jonas	Stadium: Morumbi; Attendance: 0 Referee: Marcelo de Lima Henrique

17 July 2021 12	São Paulo	0–1	Fortaleza	São Paulo
17:00 UTC−3	Joao Rojas (yellow card) 36'; Léo (yellow card) 43'; Antonio Galeano (yellow card) 67'	Report	(yellow card) 44' Titi; (yellow card) 72' David; 74' Robson	Stadium: Morumbi; Attendance: 0 Referee: Sávio Pereira

25 July 2021 13	Flamengo	5–1	São Paulo	Rio de Janeiro
16:00 UTC−3	Rodrigo Caio (yellow card) 53'; Willian Arão (yellow card) 54'; Filipe Luís (yellow card) 62'; Bruno Henrique 70', 72', 77'; Gustavo Henrique 86'; Welington 90+2' (o.g.)	Report	(yellow card) 32' Welington; (yellow card) 40' Reinaldo; 48' Arboleda; (yellow card) 62' Marquinhos; (yellow card) 83' Emiliano Rigoni; (yellow card) 85' Igor Vinícius; (yellow card) 90+10' Martín Benítez	Stadium: Maracanã; Attendance: 0 Referee: Felipe Fernandes de Lima

31 July 2021 14	São Paulo	0–0	Palmeiras	São Paulo
19:00 UTC−3	Gabriel Sara (yellow card) 62'; Rodrigo Nestor (yellow card) 79'; Miranda (yellow card) 90+4'; Emiliano Rigoni (red card) 90+5'	Report	(yellow card) 77' Breno Lopes; (yellow card) 78' Felipe Melo; (yellow card) 81' Danilo	Stadium: Morumbi; Attendance: 0 Referee: Luiz Flávio de Oliveira

7 August 2021 15	Athletico Paranaense	1–2	São Paulo	Curitiba
18:00 UTC−3	Renato Kayzer 28'; Richard (yellow card) 72'; Thiago Heleno (yellow card) 74'; David Terans (yellow card) 83'	Report	14' (pen.), 33' Pablo; (yellow card) 17' Welington; (yellow card) 27' Igor Vinícius; (red card) 82' Martín Benítez; (yellow card) 83' Lucas Perri; (yellow card) 87' Antonio Galeano	Stadium: Arena da Baixada; Attendance: 0 Referee: Jean Pierre Gonçalves Lima

14 August 2021 16	São Paulo	2–1	Grêmio	São Paulo
21:00 UTC−3	Vitor Bueno 13'; Bruno Alves (yellow card) 21'; Igor Gomes (yellow card) 61', (goal) 90+3'	Report	(yellow card) 12' Geromel; 20' Vanderson	Stadium: Morumbi; Attendance: 0 Referee: Bráulio da Silva Machado

22 August 2021 17	Sport	0–1	São Paulo	Recife
20:30 UTC−3	André (yellow card) 73'; Paulinho Moccelin (yellow card) 79'	Report	5' Pablo; (yellow card) 43' Liziero; (yellow card) 85' Léo	Stadium: Ilha do Retiro; Attendance: 0 Referee: Paulo Roberto Alves Júnior

29 August 2021 18	Juventude	1–1	São Paulo	Caxias do Sul
16:00 UTC−3	Ricardo Bueno (yellow card) 44', (goal) 90+1'; William Matheus (yellow card) 84'	Report	(yellow card) 41' Léo; (yellow card) 55' Luan; (yellow card) 72' Igor Vinícius; 85' (pen.) Reinaldo; (yellow card) 90+1' Miranda; (yellow card) 90+4' Luciano	Stadium: Estádio Alfredo Jaconi; Attendance: 0 Referee: Antônio Dib Moraes de Sousa

12 September 2021 20	Fluminense	2–1	São Paulo	Rio de Janeiro
20:30 UTC−3	Nino 50', (yellow card) 58'; Fred (yellow card) 57'; Luiz Henrique 66'; Luccas Claro (yellow card) 72'; André (yellow card) 85'; Raúl Bobadilla (yellow card) 90+6'	Report	(yellow card) 36' Igor Gomes; 60' (pen.) Reinaldo; (yellow card) 76' Miranda; (yellow card) 80' Emiliano Rigoni; (yellow card) 87' Gabriel Neves	Stadium: Maracanã; Attendance: 0 Referee: Jefferson Ferreira de Moraes

19 September 2021 21	São Paulo	2–1	Atlético Goianiense	São Paulo
16:00 UTC−3	Emiliano Rigoni 36'; Luciano 56'; Léo (yellow card) 83'	Report	Willian Maranhão (yellow card) 27'; Matheus Barbosa 71'; Natanael (yellow card) 86'	Stadium: Morumbi; Attendance: 0 Referee: Caio Augusto Max Vieira

22 September 2021 19	São Paulo	0–0	América Mineiro	São Paulo
20:30 UTC−3	Robert Arboleda (yellow card) 44'; Miranda (yellow card) 50'; Reinaldo (yellow card) 75'	Report	(yellow card) 65' Mauro Zárate	Stadium: Morumbi; Attendance: 0 Referee: Bráulio da Silva Machado

25 September 2021 22	São Paulo	0–0	Atlético Mineiro	São Paulo
21:00 UTC−3	Miranda (yellow card) 67'	Report	(yellow card) 39' Guga	Stadium: Morumbi; Attendance: 0 Referee: Wilton Pereira Sampaio

3 October 2021 23	Chapecoense	1–1	São Paulo	Chapecó
16:00 UTC−3	Léo Gomes (yellow card) 20'; Mike 76'	Report	36' Emiliano Rigoni; (yellow card) 68' Antonio Galeano	Stadium: Arena Condá; Attendance: 973; Referee: Marielson Alves Silva

7 October 2021 24	São Paulo	1–1	Santos	São Paulo
19:00 UTC−3	Jonathan Calleri 35' (pen.); Welington (yellow card) 73'	Report	5' Carlos Sánchez; (yellow card) 77' Vinicius Balieiro; (yellow card) 80' Marinho; (yellow card) 90+3' Danilo Boza	Stadium: Morumbi; Attendance: 5,529; Referee: Raphael Claus

11 October 2021 25	Cuiabá	0–0	São Paulo	Cuiabá
20:00 UTC−3	Jonathan Cafu (yellow card) 487'; Auremir (yellow card) 90'	Report	(yellow card) 47' Igor Gomes; (yellow card) 90+1' Marquinhos	Stadium: Arena Pantanal; Referee: Anderson Daronco

14 October 2021 26	São Paulo	1–1	Ceará	São Paulo
19:00 UTC−3	Miranda (yellow card) 38'; Luis Manuel Orejuela (yellow card) 48'; Jonathan Calleri 52', (yellow card) 61'	Report	23', (yellow card) 36' Fabinho; (yellow card) 45+3' Richard; (yellow card) 86' William Oliveira	Stadium: Morumbi; Referee: Paulo César Zanovelli

18 October 2021 27	São Paulo	1–0	Corinthians	São Paulo
20:00 UTC−3	Jonathan Calleri 7'; Liziero (yellow card) 43'; Gabriel Neves (yellow card) 61'; Robert Arboleda (yellow card) 62'	Report	(yellow card) 43' João Victor; (yellow card) 82' Róger Guedes	Stadium: Morumbi; Attendance: 23,874; Referee: Leandro Vuaden

24 October 2021 28	Red Bull Bragantino	1–0	São Paulo	Bragança Paulista
18:15 UTC−3	Helinho (yellow card) 40'; Luan Cândido 56'; Jadsom Silva (yellow card) 78'; Fabrício Bruno (yellow card) 90+5'	Report		Stadium: Nabi Abi Chedid; Attendance: 4,345; Referee: Felipe Fernandes de Lima

31 October 2021 29	São Paulo	1–0	Internacional	São Paulo
18:15 UTC−3	Gabriel Sara 5'	Report	(yellow card) 36' Víctor Cuesta; (yellow card) 78' Kaique Rocha	Stadium: Morumbi; Attendance: 19,867; Referee: André Castro

7 November 2021 30	Bahia	1–0	São Paulo	Salvador
18:15 UTC−3	Patrick de Lucca (yellow card) 70'; Rossi 77'	Report	(yellow card) 43' Víctor Cuesta; (yellow card) 57' Kaique Rocha	Stadium: Arena Fonte Nova; Referee: Sávio Peeira Sampaio

10 November 2021 31	Fortaleza	1–1	São Paulo	Fortaleza
21:30 UTC−3	Robson (yellow card) 39', (goal) 59'; Wellington Paulista (yellow card) 90+1'; Jussa (yellow card) 90+7'	Report	(yellow card) 33' Gabriel Sara; (yellow card) 58' Rodrigo Nestor; (yellow card) 79', (goal) 90+2' Martín Benítez; (yellow card) 86' Luciano; (yellow card) 86' Eder; (yellow card) 86' Welington	Stadium: Arena Castelão; Referee: Paulo Roberto Alves Júnior

14 November 2021 32	São Paulo	0–4	Flamengo	São Paulo
18:15 UTC−3	Jonathan Calleri (red card) 10'; Shaylon (yellow card) 87'	Report	1' Gabriel; 4' Bruno Henrique; (yellow card) 22' Matheuzinho; 42', 55' Michael	Stadium: Morumbi; Attendance: 47,855; Referee: Leandro Vuaden

17 November 2021 33	Palmeiras	0–2	São Paulo	São Paulo
20:30 UTC−3	Patrick de Paula (yellow card) 42'	Report	24' Gabriel Sara; (yellow card) 57' Vitor Bueno; 61' Luciano; (yellow card) 82' Eder	Stadium: Allianz Parque; Attendance: 35,570; Referee: Marcelo de Lima Henrique

24 November 2021 34	São Paulo	0–0	Athletico Paranaense	São Paulo
21:30 UTC−3	Reinaldo (yellow card) 14'; Jonathan Calleri (yellow card) 29'; Léo (yellow card) 90'	Report	(yellow card) 29' Santos; (yellow card) 71' Marcinho	Stadium: Morumbi; Attendance: 43,391; Referee: Leandro Vuaden

27 November 2021 36	São Paulo	2–0	Sport	São Paulo
21:30 UTC−3	Jonathan Calleri 50'; Gabriel Sara 80'	Report	(yellow card) 41' Gustavo	Stadium: Morumbi; Attendance: 35,679; Referee: Héber Roberto Lopes

2 December 2021 35	Grêmio	3–0	São Paulo	Porto Alegre
20:00 UTC−3	Thiago Santos 23'; Diogo Barbosa 68'; Douglas Costa (yellow card) 74'; Gabriel Grando (yellow card) 85'; Miguel Borja (yellow card) 90+3'; Jhonata Robert 90+4'	Report	(yellow card) 60' Emiliano Rigoni; (yellow card) 90+1' Miranda	Stadium: Arena do Grêmio; Referee: Sávio Pereira Sampaio

6 December 2021 37	São Paulo	3–1	Juventude	São Paulo
19:00 UTC−3	Luciano (yellow card) 1', (goal) 5', 67'; Robert Arboleda (yellow card) 30'; Jonathan Calleri 43'; Liziero (yellow card) 61'; Igor Gomes (yellow card) 78'; Léo (yellow card) 89'	Report	(yellow card) 27' Rafael Forster; (yellow card) 41' William Matheus; 63' Sorriso; (yellow card) 90' Capixaba	Stadium: Morumbi; Attendance: 40,442; Referee: Bráulio da Silva Machado

9 December 2021 38	América Mineiro	2–0	São Paulo	Belo Horizonte
21:30 UTC−3	Zé Ricardo (yellow card) 28'; Ricardo Silva (yellow card) 45+4'; Ademir 58', 62'	Report	(yellow card) 45+4' Diego Costa; (yellow card) 79' Gabriel Neves	Stadium: Estádio Independência; Referee: Caio Max Augusto Vieira

=== Copa do Brasil ===
==== Third round ====
1 June 2021 First leg	4 de Julho	3–2	São Paulo	Teresina
21:30 UTC−3	Orejuela 9' (o.g.); Marcelo Sousa (yellow card) 34'; Gilmar Bahia 45+1'; Rômulo 66'; Chico Bala (yellow card) 86'	Report	22', 30' Éder; (yellow card) 76' Talles Costa; (yellow card) 89' Shaylon	Stadium: Albertão; Attendance: 0 Referee: Zandick Gondim Alves Júnior

8 June 2021 Second leg	São Paulo	9–1 (11–4 agg.)	4 de Julho	São Paulo
19:00 UTC−3	Luciano 17', 90'; Pablo 22', 56', 83'; G. Sara 31'; Miranda (yellow card) 35'; Nestor (yellow card) 54'; Rigoni 62'; B. Alves 66'; Chico Bala 86' (o.g.)	Report	1' Dudu Beberibe	Stadium: Morumbi; Attendance: 0 Referee: Denis Ribeiro Serafim

==== Round of 16 ====
28 July 2021 First leg	São Paulo	2–0	Vasco da Gama	São Paulo
21:30 UTC−3	Emiliano Rigoni 14'; Pablo 79'	Report	(yellow card) 89' Leandro Castán	Stadium: Morumbi; Attendance: 0 Referee: Wilton Pereira Sampaio

4 August 2021 Second leg	Vasco da Gama	1–2 (1–4 agg.)	São Paulo	Rio de Janeiro
21:30 UTC−3	Léo Jabá (red card) 34'; Liziero 71' (o.g.); Leandro Castán (red card) 79'	Report	(yellow card) 28' Talles Costa; 43' Emiliano Rigoni; 50' Martín Benítez	Stadium: Estádio São Januário; Attendance: 0 Referee: Anderson Daronco

===== Quarter-finals =====
25 August 2021 First leg	São Paulo	2–2	Fortaleza	São Paulo
21:30 UTC−3	Gabriel Sara (yellow card) 28'; Emiliano Rigoni 69', 79'; Léo (yellow card) 86'	Report	84' Yago Pikachu; 90+3' Romarinho	Stadium: Morumbi; Attendance: 0 Referee: Wilton Pereira Sampaio

15 September 2021 Second leg	Fortaleza	3–1 (5–3 agg.)	São Paulo	Fortaleza
21:30 UTC−3	Ronald 21'; Ángelo Henríquez 82'; David 90+2', (yellow card) 90+3'	Report	90+5' Gabriel Sara	Stadium: Arena Castelão; Attendance: 0 Referee: Bruno Arleu de Araújo
