= Marcos Júnior (disambiguation) =

Marcos Júnior may refer to:

- Marcos Júnior (born 1993), Marcos Júnior Lima dos Santos, Brazilian attacking midfielder
- Marcos Júnior (footballer, born 1995), Marcos Antônio Candido Ferreira Júnior, Brazilian midfielder
- Marcos Júnior (footballer, born 2000), Marcos Antonio Augusto Júnior, Brazilian defensive midfielder
- Marcos Júnior (politician) (born 2003), Brazilian politician
