= 2019 São Paulo FC season =

São Paulo
2019 season
- Fernando Diniz: Carlos Augusto de Barros e Silva (Leco)
- Manager: André Jardine (until February 14); Vagner Mancini (until March 30); Cuca (until September 25); Fernando Diniz
- Stadium: Estádio do Morumbi
- Série A: 6th
- Campeonato Paulista: Runner-up
- Copa Libertadores: Second stage
- Copa do Brasil: Round of 16
- Top goalscorer: League: Vitor Bueno (6 goals); All: Pablo (7 goals)
- Highest home attendance: 58,713
- Lowest home attendance: 8,855
- Average home league attendance: 36,641 (League)
Home colours	Away colours	Third colours

The 2019 season was São Paulo's 90th year since the club's existence. Celebrating 9 decades of history, The Dearest has taken a place at a Campeonato Paulista finals after 16 years of tries, against the same rival of 2003 finals, Corinthians, but for the Tricolor Paulista a bad result happened again. São Paulo FC fatally fell in front of Corinthians in the last minute of second half in second match, by a result of 1–2 (Away) after 0–0 in Home. In other championships, São Paulo hadn't similar performance being prematurely eliminated in Copa do Brasil by Bahia by two losses and the painful defeat in the history of Copa Libertadores, in preliminary round by the Argentine club Talleres. Following an unsuccessful season, the only and last "hopeness" for the paulistas has turned into the national league, Série A. The Tricolor kept a regular position in the table between the 4th place and 8th place however constantly changing the head coaches (a very common practice by Brazilian clubs face of bad negative results in just a few matches). In overall were four managers, André Jardine, Vagner Mancini, Cuca and Fernando Diniz in the entire year of 2019. Finishing the performance of the season, the club has taken a place in the group stage of Copa Libertadores in 2020, keeping the dream of new international trophies in the next year.

== Players ==
=== Current squad ===
As of 26 September 2019

Note: Flags indicate national team as defined under FIFA eligibility rules; some limited exceptions apply. Players may hold more than one non-FIFA nationality.

No.	Pos.	Nation	Player
1	GK	BRA	Jean
2	DF	BRA	Igor Vinícius (on loan from Ituano)
3	DF	BRA	Bruno Alves
4	DF	BRA	Anderson Martins
5	DF	ECU	Robert Arboleda
6	DF	BRA	Reinaldo
7	FW	BRA	Alexandre Pato
8	MF	BRA	Jucilei
9	FW	BRA	Pablo
10	DF	BRA	Dani Alves
11	MF	BRA	Helinho
12	MF	BRA	Vitor Bueno
13	MF	BRA	Luan
14	MF	BRA	Liziero
15	MF	BRA	Hernanes
16	DF	BRA	Léo
19	FW	BRA	Marcos Calazans

No.	Pos.	Nation	Player
20	DF	ESP	Juanfran
21	FW	BRA	Raniel
22	MF	BRA	Everton
23	GK	BRA	Tiago Volpi (on loan from Querétaro)
25	MF	BRA	Hudson (captain)
26	MF	BRA	Igor Gomes
28	MF	BRA	Tchê Tchê
39	FW	BRA	Antony
40	GK	BRA	Lucas Perri
41	GK	BRA	Júnior
43	DF	BRA	Walce
44	FW	BRA	Jonas Toró
—	FW	URU	Gonzalo Carneiro
—	FW	ECU	Joao Rojas
—	FW	BRA	Léo Natel
—	MF	BRA	Maicosuel

=== Transfers ===
==== Transfers in ====
Pos.	Player	Transferred from	Fee/notes	Date	Source
DF	(Brazil) Igor Vinícius	(Brazil) Ponte Preta	On loan	December 4, 2018	
DF	(Brazil) Léo	(Brazil) Bahia	R$ 3,000,000	December 5, 2018	
FW	(Brazil) Pablo	(Brazil) Athletico Paranaense	R$ 26,600,000	December 19, 2018	
GK	(Brazil) Tiago Volpi	(Mexico) Querétaro	On loan	December 23, 2018	
MF	(Brazil) Hernanes	(China) Hebei Fortune	R$ 13,200,000	December 29, 2018	
FW	(Brazil) Biro Biro	(China) Shanghai Shenxin	Free	January 2, 2019	
MF	(Brazil) Willian Farias	(Brazil) Vitória	Free	January 3, 2019	
MF	(Argentina) Jonathan Gómez	(Saudi Arabia) Al-Fayha	Loan return	January 28, 2019	
FW	(Brazil) Alexandre Pato	(China) Tianjin Tianhai	Free	March 27, 2019	
MF	(Brazil) Tchê Tchê	(Ukraine) Dynamo Kyiv	R$ 20,800,000	March 30, 2019	
MF	(Brazil) Vitor Bueno	(Brazil) Santos	On loan	April 3, 2019	
MF	(Brazil) Marcos Calazans	(Brazil) Fluminense	Free	May 22, 2019	
MF	(Brazil) Maicosuel	(Brazil) Paraná Clube	Loan Return	June 4, 2019	
FW	(Brazil) Léo Natel	(Cyprus) APOEL FC	Loan Return	July 1, 2019	
GK	(Brazil) Lucas Perri	(England) Crystal Palace	Loan Return	June 24, 2019	
MF	(Brazil) Lucas Fernandes	(Portugal) Portimonense	Loan Return	July 15, 2019	
RB	(Brazil) Dani Alves	(France) Paris Saint-Germain	Free	August 1, 2019	
RB	(Spain) Juanfran	(Spain) Atlético Madrid	Free	August 2, 2019	

==== Transfers out ====
Pos.	Player	Transferred to	Fee/notes	Date	Source
FW	(Brazil) Joanderson	(Brazil) Grêmio	Free	December 12, 2018	
GK	(Brazil) Sidão	(Brazil) Goiás	Free	December 13, 2018	
DF	(Brazil) Auro Jr.	(Canada) Toronto FC	R$ 2,600,000	December 16, 2018	
DF	(Brazil) Rodrigo Caio	(Brazil) Flamengo	R$ 22,200,000	December 29, 2018	
FW	(Brazil) João Paulo	(Brazil) Ceará	Free	December 30, 2018	
MF	(Brazil) Shaylon	(Brazil) Bahia	On loan	December 30, 2018	
MF	(Brazil) Roni	(Turkey) Adanaspor	Free	December 31, 2018	
MF	(Brazil) Thomaz	(Bolivia) Bolívar	On loan	January 4, 2019	
FW	(Brazil) Pedro Bortoluzo	(Brazil) Criciúma	On loan	January 4, 2019	
FW	(Colombia) Santiago Tréllez	(Brazil) Internacional	On loan	January 13, 2019	
GK	(Brazil) Lucas Perri	(England) Crystal Palace	On loan	January 15, 2019	
FW	(Brazil) Caíque	(Brazil) Criciúma	On loan	January 17, 2019	
MF	(Brazil) Maicosuel	(Brazil) Paraná Clube	On loan	January 24, 2019	
DF	(Brazil) Tuta	(Germany) Eintracht Frankfurt	R$7,600,000	January 29, 2019	
FW	(Brazil) Guilherme Bissoli	(Paraguay) Fernando de la Mora	Free	January 31, 2019	
MF	(Brazil) Felipe Araruna	(Brazil) Fortaleza	On loan	March 8, 2019	
FW	(Brazil) Diego Souza	(Brazil) Botafogo	On loan	March 8, 2019	
DF	(Brazil) Edimar	(Brazil) Bragantino	Free	April 25, 2019	
MF	(Argentina) Jonathan Gómez	(Brazil) CSA	On loan	May 24, 2019	
FW	(Brazil) Brenner	(Brazil) Fluminense	On loan	May 25, 2019	
DF	(Brazil) Lucão	(Brazil) Goiás	Free	June 3, 2019	
FW	(Brazil) Paulinho Bóia	(Brazil) São Bento	On loan	June 18, 2019	
FW	(Brazil) Biro Biro	(Brazil) Nova Iguaçu	Free	June 24, 2019	
DF	(Brazil) Rodrigo Freitas	(Portugal) Portimonense	On loan	June 25, 2019	
GK	(Brazil) Lucas Paes	(Portugal) Louletano	On loan	July 4, 2019	
MF	(Brazil) Nenê	(Brazil) Fluminense	Free	July 12, 2019	
MF	(Brazil) Lucas Fernandes	(Portugal) Portimonense	R$10,000,000	August 15, 2019	
MF	(Brazil) Everton Felipe	(Brazil) Athletico Paranaense	On loan	August 30, 2019	
DF	(Brazil) Morato	(Portugal) Benfica	R$27,300,000	September 2, 2019	
DF	(Brazil) Lucas Kal	(Brazil) América Mineiro	On loan	September 6, 2019	
MF	(Brazil) Willian Farias	(Brazil) Sport Recife	Free	September 13, 2019	
DF	(Brazil) Bruno Peres	(Brazil) Sport Recife	Free	September 26, 2019	

== Competitions ==
=== Overview ===
Competition	First match	Last match	Starting round	Final position	Record							
Competition	First match	Last match	Starting round	Final position	Pld	W	D	L	GF	GA	GD	Win %
Série A	27 April 2019	8 December 2019	Matchday 1	6th	38	17	12	9	39	30	+9	44.74
Copa do Brasil	22 May 2019	29 May 2019	Round of 16	Round of 16	2	0	0	2	0	2	−2	0.00
Campeonato Paulista	19 January 2019	7 April 2019	Matchday 1	Runners-up	18	6	6	6	17	13	+4	33.33
Copa Libertadores	6 February 2019	13 February 2019	Second stage	Second stage	2	0	1	1	0	2	−2	0.00
Total					60	23	19	18	56	47	+9	38.33

Source: Competitions

=== Overall ===
Games played	62 (18 Campeonato Paulista, 2 Copa do Brasil, 2 Copa Libertadores, 38 Campeonato Brasileiro, 2 Friendly match)
Games won	23 (6 Campeonato Paulista, 0 Copa do Brasil, 0 Copa Libertadores, 17 Campeonato Brasileiro, 0 Friendly match)
Games drawn	19 (6 Campeonato Paulista, 0 Copa do Brasil, 1 Copa Libertadores, 12 Campeonato Brasileiro, 0 Friendly match)
Games lost	20 (6 Campeonato Paulista, 2 Copa do Brasil, 1 Copa Libertadores, 9 Campeonato Brasileiro, 2 Friendly match)
Goals scored	59
Goals conceded	53
Goal difference	+6
Best result	4–0 (H) v Chapecoense – Campeonato Brasileiro Série A – July 22, 2019
Worst result	0–3 (A) v Palmeiras – Campeonato Brasileiro Série A – October 30, 2019; 0–3 (A) v Grêmio – Campeonato Brasileiro Série A – December 1, 2019
Top scorer	Pablo (7 goals)

Source: São Paulo FC

=== Goalscorers ===
In italic players who left the team in mid-season.

Place	Position	Nationality	Number	Name	Campeonato Paulista	Copa Libertadores	Série A	Copa do Brasil	Friendlies	Total
1	FW	(Brazil)	12	Pablo	4	0	3	0	0	7
2	FW	(Brazil)	39	Antony	2	0	4	0	0	6
=	DF	(Brazil)	6	Reinaldo	1	0	5	0	0	6
=	MF	(Brazil)	12	Vitor Bueno	0	0	6	0	0	6
3	FW	(Brazil)	7	Alexandre Pato	0	0	5	0	0	5
=	MF	(Brazil)	15	Hernanes	2	0	2	0	1	5
4	MF	(Brazil)	15	Igor Gomes	2	0	2	0	0	4
5	FW	(Brazil)	44	Toró	0	0	3	0	0	3
6	DF	(Brazil)	10	Dani Alves	0	0	2	0	0	2
=	MF	(Brazil)	25	Hudson	1	0	1	0	0	2
=	DF	(Ecuador)	5	Robert Arboleda	1	0	1	0	0	2
7	DF	(Brazil)	4	Anderson Martins	1	0	0	0	0	1
=	MF	(Brazil)	28	Brenner	0	0	0	0	1	1
=	DF	(Brazil)	3	Bruno Alves	0	0	1	0	0	1
=	MF	(Brazil)	9	Diego Souza	1	0	0	0	0	1
=	FW	(Brazil)	22	Éverton	0	0	1	0	0	1
=	MF	(Brazil)	18	Everton Felipe	1	0	0	0	0	1
=	DF	(Brazil)		Igor Vinícius	0	0	1	0	0	1
=	MF	(Brazil)	14	Liziero	1	0	0	0	0	1
=	MF	(Brazil)		Nenê	0	0	0	0	1	1
=	FW	(Brazil)	21	Raniel	0	0	1	0	0	1
=	MF	(Brazil)	28	Tchê Tchê	0	0	1	0	0	1
				Total	17	0	39	0	3	59

=== Managers performance ===
Name	Nationality	From	To	P	W	D	L	GF	GA	Win%
André Jardine	Brazil	10 January	13 February	10	3	1	6	11	13	33%
Vagner Mancini	Brazil	17 February	30 March	9	3	4	2	8	6	48%
Cuca	Brazil	7 April	25 September	26	9	10	7	24	19	47%
Fernando Diniz	Brazil	28 September	8 December	17	8	4	5	16	15	55%

== Friendlies ==
=== Florida Cup ===
10 January 1	Eintracht Frankfurt (Germany)	2–1	(Brazil) São Paulo	St. Petersburg
19:00 UTC-05:00	Rebić 9' (pen.); Igor Vinícius 64' (o.g.)	Report	Nenê 55'	Stadium: Al Lang Stadium; Referee: Andrew Musashe (United States)

12 January 2	São Paulo (Brazil)	2–4	(Netherlands) Ajax	Orlando
13:00 EST (UTC−5)	Hernanes 22'; Brenner 65'	Report	Van de Beek 57'; Tadić 73' (pen.); Dolberg 79'; Neres 90+1'	Stadium: Orlando City Stadium; Referee: Elvis Osmanovic (United States)

== Competitions ==
=== Group D ===
Pos	Team	Pld	W	D	L	GF	GA	GD	Pts	Qualification or relegation
1	Ituano	12	5	2	5	19	12	+7	17	Knockout stage
2	São Paulo	12	4	3	5	13	10	+3	15	Knockout stage
3	Oeste	12	3	4	5	13	14	−1	13	
4	Botafogo–SP	12	3	2	7	14	15	−1	11	

Source: Soccerway

==== First stage ====
São Paulo was drawn on the Group D.

19 January 1	São Paulo	4–1	Mirassol	São Paulo
19:30 (UTC−2)	Anderson Martins 30'; Pablo 51'; Reinaldo 58'; Hudson 66'	Report	Bruno Peres 13' (o.g.)	Stadium: Estádio Municipal Paulo Machado de Carvalho (Pacaembu); Attendance: 20,355; Referee: Leandro Bizzio Marinho

24 January 2	Novorizontino	0–3	São Paulo	Novo Horizonte
21:00 (UTC−2)		Report	Everton Felipe 8'; Diego Souza 31'; Pablo 72'	Stadium: Estádio Dr. Jorge Ismael de Biasi; Attendance: 5,455; Referee: Marcio Henrique de Gois

27 January 3	Santos	2–0	São Paulo	São Paulo
17:00 (UTC−2)	Luiz Felipe 45'; Derlis González 67'	Report		Stadium: Estádio Municipal Paulo Machado de Carvalho (Pacaembu); Attendance: 18,601; Referee: Vinicius Furlan

31 January 4	São Paulo	0–1	Guarani	São Paulo
21:00 (UTC−2)		Report	William Matheus 2'	Stadium: Estádio Municipal Paulo Machado de Carvalho (Pacaembu); Attendance: 11,505; Referee: Douglas Marques das Flores

3 February 5	São Paulo	1–0	São Bento	São Paulo
17:00 (UTC−2)	Hernanes 15'	Report		Stadium: Estádio Municipal Paulo Machado de Carvalho (Pacaembu); Attendance: 8,855; Referee: Vinicius Gonçalves Dias Araujo

9 February 6	Ponte Preta	1–0	São Paulo	Campinas
19:00 (UTC−2)	Hugo Cabral 78'	Report		Stadium: Estádio Moisés Lucarelli; Attendance: 4,144; Referee: Raphael Claus

17 February 7	Corinthians	2–1	São Paulo	São Paulo
19:00 (UTC−3)	Manoel 43'; Gustavo 73'	Report	Pablo 57'	Stadium: Arena Corinthians; Attendance: 42,303; Referee: Lucas Canetto Bellote

24 February 8	São Paulo	0–0	Red Bull Brasil	São Paulo
17:00 (UTC−3)		Report		Stadium: Estádio Cícero Pompeu de Toledo (Morumbi); Attendance: 10,391; Referee: Luiz Flávio de Oliveira

3 March 9	Bragantino	0–2	São Paulo	Bragança Paulista
17:00 (UTC−3)		Report	Pablo 62'; Arboleda 75'	Stadium: Estádio Nabi Abi Chedid; Attendance: 5,379; Referee: Rodrigo Guarizo Ferreira do Amaral

9 March 10	São Paulo	1–1	Ferroviária	São Paulo
21:00 (UTC−3)	Hernanes 46'	Report	Léo Artur 19'	Stadium: Estádio Cícero Pompeu de Toledo (Morumbi); Attendance: 9,985; Referee: Adriano de Assis Miranda

16 March 11	São Paulo	0–1	Palmeiras	São Paulo
16:30 (UTC−3)		Report	Carlos Eduardo 79'	Stadium: Estádio Cícero Pompeu de Toledo (Morumbi); Attendance: 17,705; Referee: Thiago Duarte Peixoto

20 March 12	São Caetano	1–1	São Paulo	São Caetano do Sul
21:30 (UTC−3)	Pablo Oliveira 86'	Report	Antony 70'	Stadium: Estádio Anacleto Campanella; Attendance: 2,981; Referee: Luiz Flávio de Oliveira

=== Knockout stage ===
==== Quarterfinal ====
24 March First leg	São Paulo	2–1	Ituano	São Paulo
16:00 UTC−3	Igor Gomes 33', 60'	Report	Morato 82'	Stadium: Estádio Cícero Pompeu de Toledo (Morumbi); Attendance: 18,573; Referee: José Claudio Rocha Filho

27 March Second leg	Ituano	0–1 (1–3 agg.)	São Paulo	Itu, São Paulo
19:15 UTC−3		Report	Liziero 71'	Stadium: Estádio Novelli Júnior; Attendance: 9,028; Referee: Flávio Rodrigues de Souza

==== Semifinal ====
30 March First leg	São Paulo	0–0	Palmeiras	São Paulo
18:00 UTC−3		Report		Stadium: Estádio Cícero Pompeu de Toledo (Morumbi); Attendance: 43,202; Referee: Vinícius Furlan

7 April Second leg	Palmeiras	0–0 (0–0 agg.) (4–5 p)	São Paulo	São Paulo
16:00 UTC−3		Report		Stadium: Allianz Parque; Attendance: 39,751; Referee: Flavio Rodrigues de Souza
	Penalties
	Bruno Henrique (penalty scored); Gómez (penalty scored); Ricardo Goulart (penalty missed); Luan (penalty scored); Diogo Barbosa (penalty scored); Zé Rafael (penalty missed)		(penalty scored) Nenê; (penalty scored) Everton Felipe; (penalty scored) Hudson; (penalty scored) Carneiro; (penalty missed) Tiago Volpi; (penalty scored) Bruno Alves

==== Final ====
14 April First leg	São Paulo	0–0	Corinthians	São Paulo
16:00 UTC−3		Report		Stadium: Estádio Cícero Pompeu de Toledo (Morumbi); Attendance: 58,713; Referee: Luiz Flávio de Oliveira

21 April Second leg	Corinthians	2–1 (2–1 agg.)	São Paulo	São Paulo
16:00 UTC−3	Danilo Avelar 31'; Vágner Love 89'	Report	Antony 45+2'	Stadium: Arena Corinthians; Attendance: 46,481; Referee: Raphael Claus

==== Record ====
Final Position	Points	Matches	Wins	Draws	Losses	Goals For	Goals Away	Win%
2nd	24	18	6	6	6	17	13	44%

=== Copa Libertadores ===
==== Second stage ====
6 February First leg	Talleres (Argentina)	2–0	(Brazil) São Paulo	Córdoba
20:30 UTC−3	Ramírez 57' Pochettino 86'	Report		Stadium: Estadio Mario Alberto Kempes; Referee: Wilmar Roldán (Colombia)

13 February Second leg	São Paulo (Brazil)	0–0	(Argentina) Talleres	São Paulo
21:30 UTC−2		Report		Stadium: Estádio Cícero Pompeu de Toledo (Morumbi); Attendance: 44,737; Referee: Roddy Zambrano (Ecuador)

==== Record ====
Final Position	Points	Matches	Wins	Draws	Losses	Goals For	Goals Away	Win%
43rd	1	2	0	1	1	0	2	16%

=== Campeonato Brasileiro Série A ===
==== Results summary ====
Overall								Home						Away					
Pld	W	D	L	GF	GA	GD	Pts	W	D	L	GF	GA	GD	W	D	L	GF	GA	GD
38	17	12	9	39	30	+9	63	10	6	3	23	12	+11	7	6	6	16	18	−2

==== Results by round ====
27 April 1	São Paulo	2–0	Botafogo	São Paulo
16:00 UTC-03:00	Éverton 40'; Hudson 82'	Report		Stadium: Estádio Cícero Pompeu de Toledo (Morumbi); Attendance: 26,533; Referee: Caio Max Augusto Vieira

1 May 2	Goiás	1–2	São Paulo	Goiânia
21:30 UTC-03:00	Barcia 45+3'	Report	Pato 31'; Toró 35'	Stadium: Estádio do Governo do Estado de Goiás (Serra Dourada); Attendance: 27,715; Referee: Rafael Traci

5 May 3	São Paulo	1–1	Flamengo	São Paulo
16:00 UTC-03:00	Tchê Tchê 83'	Report	Berrío 8'	Stadium: Estádio Cícero Pompeu de Toledo (Morumbi); Attendance: 38,749; Referee: Ricardo Marques Ribeiro

12 May 4	Fortaleza	0–1	São Paulo	Fortaleza
19:00 UTC-03:00		Report	Hernanes 76'	Stadium: Estádio Governador Plácido Castelo (Castelão); Attendance: 42,955; Referee: Wilton Pereira Sampaio

19 May 5	São Paulo	0–0	Bahia	São Paulo
11:00 UTC-03:00		Report		Stadium: Estádio Cícero Pompeu de Toledo (Morumbi); Attendance: 44,640; Referee: Daniel Nobre Bins

26 May 6	Corinthians	1–0	São Paulo	São Paulo
19:00 UTC-03:00	Pedrinho 6'	Report		Stadium: Arena Corinthians; Attendance: 39,378; Referee: Flávio Rodrigues de Souza

2 June 7	São Paulo	1–1	Cruzeiro	São Paulo
16:00 UTC-03:00	Pato 14'	Report	Thiago Neves 67'	Stadium: Estádio Municipal Paulo Machado de Carvalho (Pacaembu); Attendance: 7,853; Referee: Bráulio da Silva Machado

8 June 8	Avaí	0–0	São Paulo	Florianópolis
21:00 UTC-03:00		Report		Stadium: Estádio Aderbal Ramos da Silva (Ressacada); Attendance: 8,084; Referee: Caio Max Augusto Vieira

13 June 9	Atlético Mineiro	1–1	São Paulo	Belo Horizonte
20:00 UTC-03:00	Alerrandro 43'	Report	Pato 72'	Stadium: Estádio Independência; Attendance: 19,761; Referee: Leandro Pedro Vuaden

13 July 10	São Paulo	1–1	Palmeiras	São Paulo
19:00 UTC-03:00	Pablo 9'	Report	Dudu 72'	Stadium: Estádio Cícero Pompeu de Toledo (Morumbi); Attendance: 38,267; Referee: Bruno Arleu de Araújo

22 July 11	São Paulo	4–0	Chapecoense	São Paulo
20:00 UTC-03:00	Antony 48'; Toró 52'; Raniel 55'; Vitor Bueno 90+2'	Report		Stadium: Estádio Cícero Pompeu de Toledo (Morumbi); Attendance: 35,558; Referee: Sávio Pereira Sampaio

27 July 12	Fluminense	1–2	São Paulo	Rio de Janeiro
19:00 UTC-03:00	González 35'	Report	Reinaldo 19', 90+6' (pen.)	Stadium: Estádio Jornalista Mário Filho (Maracanã); Attendance: 21,741; Referee: Anderson Daronco

10 August 14	São Paulo	3–2	Santos	São Paulo
17:00 UTC-03:00	Pato 48', 71'; Reinaldo 56' (pen.)	Report	Sasha 43'; Raniel 85' (o.g.)	Stadium: Estádio Cícero Pompeu de Toledo (Morumbi); Attendance: 47,277; Referee: Raphael Claus

18 August 15	São Paulo	1–0	Ceará	São Paulo
16:00 UTC-03:00	Dani Alves 41'	Report		Stadium: Estádio Cícero Pompeu de Toledo (Morumbi); Attendance: 47,705; Referee: Gilberto Rodrigues Castro Junior

21 August 13	Athletico Paranaense	0–1	São Paulo	Curitiba
19:15 UTC-03:00		Report	Vitor Bueno 39'	Stadium: Estádio Joaquim Américo Guimarães (Arena da Baixada); Referee: Daniel Nobre Bins
Note: Match was originally at August 4, was postponed to August 21 because Athletico participation at 2019 J.League Cup / Copa Sudamericana Championship.

25 August 16	Vasco da Gama	2–0	São Paulo	Rio de Janeiro
16:00 UTC-03:00	Talles Magno 56'; Fellipe Bastos 80'	Report		Stadium: Estádio Vasco da Gama (São Januário); Attendance: 20,405; Referee: Anderson Daronco

31 August 17	São Paulo	0–0	Grêmio	São Paulo
11:00 UTC-03:00		Report		Stadium: Estádio Cícero Pompeu de Toledo (Morumbi); Attendance: 46.997; Referee: Caio Max Augusto Vieira

7 September 18	Internacional	1–0	São Paulo	Porto Alegre
19:00 UTC-03:00	Rafael Sóbis 76' (pen.)	Report		Stadium: Estádio José Pinheiro Borda (Beira-Rio); Attendance: 13,538; Referee: Marcelo de Lima Henrique

15 September 19	São Paulo	1–1	CSA	São Paulo
19:00 UTC-03:00	Reinaldo 86'	Report	Héctor Bustamante 54'	Stadium: Estádio Cícero Pompeu de Toledo (Morumbi); Referee: Héber Roberto Lopes

21 September 20	Botafogo	1–2	São Paulo	Rio de Janeiro
11:00 UTC-03:00	João Paulo 45'	Report	Hernanes 36'; Pablo 90+1'	Stadium: Estádio Olímpico Nilton Santos (Engenhão); Attendance: 18.471; Referee: Jean Pierre Gonçalves Lima

25 September 21	São Paulo	0–1	Goiás	São Paulo
21:30 UTC-03:00		Report	Barcia 16'	Stadium: Estádio Cícero Pompeu de Toledo (Morumbi); Attendance: 12,505; Referee: Bruno Arleu de Araujo

28 September 22	Flamengo	0–0	São Paulo	Rio de Janeiro
19:00 UTC-03:00		Report		Stadium: Estádio Jornalista Mário Filho (Maracanã); Attendance: 67,051; Referee: Rafael Traci

5 October 23	São Paulo	2–1	Fortaleza	São Paulo
17:00 UTC-03:00	Pablo 13'; Igor Gomes 79'	Report	Wellington Paulista 39' (pen.)	Stadium: Estádio Municipal Paulo Machado de Carvalho (Pacaembu); Attendance: 34,962; Referee: Diego Pombo Lopez

9 October 24	Bahia	0–0	São Paulo	Salvador
21:00 UTC-03:00		Report		Stadium: Itaipava Arena Fonte Nova; Attendance: 31,726; Referee: Braulio da Silva Machado

13 October 25	São Paulo	1–0	Corinthians	São Paulo
18:00 UTC-03:00	Reinaldo 66' (pen.)	Report		Stadium: Estádio Cícero Pompeu de Toledo (Morumbi); Attendance: 37,561; Referee: Raphael Claus

16 October 26	Cruzeiro	1–0	São Paulo	Belo Horizonte
21:00 UTC-03:00	Thiago Neves 57'	Report		Stadium: Estádio Governador Magalhães Pinto (Mineirão); Attendance: 30,969; Referee: Wilton Pereira Sampaio

20 October 27	São Paulo	1–0	Avaí	São Paulo
16:00 UTC-03:00	Arboleda 50'	Report		Stadium: Estádio Cícero Pompeu de Toledo (Morumbi); Attendance: 20,763; Referee: Dewson Fernando Freitas da Silva

27 October 28	São Paulo	2–0	Atlético Mineiro	São Paulo
16:00 UTC-03:00	Igor Gomes 50'; Vitor Bueno 56'	Report		Stadium: Estádio Cícero Pompeu de Toledo (Morumbi); Attendance: 18,815; Referee: Bruno Arleu de Araújo

30 October 29	Palmeiras	3–0	São Paulo	São Paulo
19:30 UTC-03:00	Bruno Henrique 11'; Felipe Melo 41'; Gustavo Scarpa 56'	Report		Stadium: Allianz Parque; Attendance: 29,481; Referee: Raphael Clausa

2 November 30	Chapecoense	0–3	São Paulo	Chapecó
21:00 UTC-03:00		Report	Bruno Alves 6'; Vitor Bueno 23'; Antony 79'	Stadium: Arena Índio Condá; Referee: Anderson Daronco

7 November 31	São Paulo	0–2	Fluminense	São Paulo
19:30 UTC-03:00		Report	Digão 37'; Marcos Paulo 40'	Stadium: Estádio Cícero Pompeu de Toledo (Morumbi); Attendance: 17,650; Referee: Daniel Nobre Bins

10 November 32	São Paulo	0–1	Athletico Paranaense	São Paulo
16:00 UTC-03:00		Report	Marcelo Cirino 89'	Stadium: Estádio Cícero Pompeu de Toledo (Morumbi); Attendance: 13,795; Referee: Wagner do Nascimento Magalhães

16 November 33	Santos	1–1	São Paulo	Santos
17:00 UTC-03:00	Sánchez 7' (pen.)	Report	Dani Alves 54'	Stadium: Estádio Urbano Caldeira (Vila Belmiro); Attendance: 14,062; Referee: Flavio Rodrigues de Souza

24 November 34	Ceará	1–1	São Paulo	Fortaleza
19:00 UTC-03:00	Felipe Silva 90+5'	Report	Vitor Bueno 45+1'	Stadium: Estádio Governador Plácido Castelo (Castelão); Referee: Rafael Traci

28 November 35	São Paulo	1–0	Vasco da Gama	São Paulo
20:30 UTC-03:00	Antony 6'	Report		Stadium: Estádio Cícero Pompeu de Toledo (Morumbi); Attendance: 11,970; Referee: Salvio Pereira Sampaio

1 December 36	Grêmio	3–0	São Paulo	Porto Alegre
19:00 UTC-03:00	Luciano 55', 61'; Vitor Bueno 58' (o.g.)	Report		Stadium: Arena do Grêmio; Attendance: 24,464; Referee: Marcelo de Lima Henrique

4 December 37	São Paulo	2–1	Internacional	São Paulo
21:30 UTC-03:00	Antony 15'; Vitor Bueno 48'	Report	Guilherme Parede 69'	Stadium: Estádio Cícero Pompeu de Toledo (Morumbi); Attendance: 30,822; Referee: Braulio da Silva Machado

8 December 38	CSA	1–2	São Paulo	Maceió
16:00 UTC-03:00	Jarro Pedroso 43'	Report	Toró 10'; Igor Vinícius 13'	Stadium: Estádio Rei Pelé (Trapichão); Referee: Alisson Sidnei Furtado

==== Record ====
Final Position	Points	Matches	Wins	Draws	Losses	Goals For	Goals Away	Win%
6th	63	38	17	12	9	39	30	55%

=== Copa do Brasil ===
The draw was held on May 2, 2019.

May 22 First leg	São Paulo (São Paulo (state))	0–1	Bahia	São Paulo
21:30 UTC-03:00		Report	Élber 72'	Stadium: Estádio Cícero Pompeu de Toledo (Morumbi); Attendance: 19,508; Referee: Bruno Arleu de Araújo

May 29 Second leg	Bahia	1–0	(São Paulo (state)) São Paulo	Salvador
21:30 UTC-03:00	Ernando 53'	Report		Stadium: Itaipava Arena Fonte Nova; Attendance: 36,016; Referee: Marcelo de Lima Henrique

==== Record ====
Final Position	Points	Matches	Wins	Draws	Losses	Goals For	Goals Away	Win%
14th	0	2	0	0	2	0	2	0%
