= Pablo (footballer, born 1992) =

Brazilian footballer

Personal information
- Full name: Pablo Felipe Teixeira
- Date of birth: 23 June 1992 (age 34)
- Place of birth: Cambé, Brazil
- Height: 1.85 m (6 ft 1 in)
- Position: Forward

Team information
- Current team: Operário Ferroviário
- Number: 92

Senior career*
| Years | Team | Apps | (Gls) |
| 2011–2018 | Athletico Paranaense | 116 | (24) |
| 2013 | → Figueirense (loan) | 25 | (8) |
| 2014 | → Real Madrid B (loan) | 4 | (0) |
| 2014 | → Figueirense (loan) | 19 | (4) |
| 2015 | → Cerezo Osaka (loan) | 40 | (8) |
| 2019–2022 | São Paulo | 95 | (23) |
| 2022–2024 | Athletico Paranaense | 114 | (31) |
| 2025 | Sport Recife | 29 | (8) |
| 2026– | Operário Ferroviário | 23 | (5) |
- * Club domestic league appearances and goals as of 18 November 2026

Pablo Felipe Teixeira (born 23 June 1992), simply known as Pablo, is a Brazilian professional footballer who plays for Operário Ferroviário. Mainly a forward, he also can play as a winger.

== Career ==
=== Athletico Paranaense ===
Born in Cambé, Paraná, Pablo finished his graduation with Atlético Paranaense's youth setup, as a right defender. On 31 August 2011 he made his first-team debut, starting in a 0–1 home loss against Atlético Mineiro.

In May 2013, Pablo was loaned to Figueirense, in Série B. He appeared in 25 matches during the campaign, scoring eight goals.

On 8 January 2014 Pablo joined Real Madrid Castilla, in a six-month loan deal. He made his Segunda División debut three days later, playing the last 21 minutes of a 2–2 home draw against Real Murcia.

=== São Paulo ===
On 18 December 2018, Pablo moved to São Paulo on a contract running until the end of 2022. São Paulo paid €5.8 million (around R$25.8 million) to Athletico Paranaense.

=== Return to Athletico Paranaense ===
On 1 February 2022, Pablo agrees to comeback to Athletico Paranaense on a free transfer after the termination of his contract with São Paulo.

== Career statistics ==
As of match played 28 November 2025

Appearances and goals by club, season and competition
| Club | Season | League | | | State League | | Cup | | Continental | | Other | | Total | |
| Club | Season | Division | Apps | Goals | Apps | Goals | Apps | Goals | Apps | Goals | Apps | Goals | Apps | Goals |
|---|---|---|---|---|---|---|---|---|---|---|---|---|---|---|
| Atlético Paranaense | 2010 | Série A | 0 | 0 | — | | — | | — | | — | | 0 | 0 |
| Atlético Paranaense | 2011 | Série A | 4 | 0 | — | | — | | — | | — | | 4 | 0 |
| Atlético Paranaense | 2012 | Série B | 5 | 0 | 4 | 0 | — | | 15 (Note: Appearance(s) in Campeonato Paranaense) | 0 | — | | 24 | 0 |
| Atlético Paranaense | 2013 | Série A | — | | — | | — | | 7 | 1 | — | | 7 | 1 |
| Atlético Paranaense | 2016 | Série A | 33 | 9 | 6 | 1 | 6 | 1 | — | | 3 (Note: Appearance(s) in Primeira Liga) | 1 | 48 | 12 |
| Atlético Paranaense | 2017 | Série A | 22 | 1 | 1 | 0 | 3 | 1 | 10 (Note: Appearances in Copa Libertadores) | 1 | — | | 36 | 3 |
| Atlético Paranaense | 2018 | Série A | 33 | 12 | — | | 6 | 1 | 12 (Note: Appearances in Copa Sudamericana) | 5 | — | | 51 | 18 |
| Atlético Paranaense | Total | | 97 | 22 | 29 | 2 | 19 | 3 | 22 | 6 | 3 | 1 | 170 | 34 |
| Figueirense (loan) | 2013 | Série B | 25 | 8 | — | | 2 | 0 | — | | — | | 27 | 8 |
| Real Madrid Castilla (loan) | 2013–14 | Segunda División | 4 | 0 | — | | — | | — | | — | | 4 | 0 |
| Figueirense (loan) | 2014 | Série A | 19 | 4 | — | | 1 | 0 | — | | — | | 20 | 4 |
| Cerezo Osaka (loan) | 2015 | J2 League | 40 | 8 | — | | — | | — | | — | | 40 | 8 |
| São Paulo | 2019 | Série A | 13 | 3 | 13 (Note: Appearances in Campeonato Paulista) | 4 | — | | 2 | 0 | — | | 28 | 7 |
| São Paulo | 2020 | Série A | 30 | 2 | 11 | 6 | 4 | 1 | 8 | 3 | — | | 53 | 12 |
| São Paulo | 2021 | Série A | 16 | 3 | 12 | 5 | 5 | 4 | 5 | 1 | — | | 38 | 13 |
| São Paulo | Total | | 59 | 8 | 36 | 15 | 9 | 5 | 15 | 4 | — | | 119 | 32 |
| Athletico Paranaense | 2022 | Série A | 25 | 4 | 5 | 1 | 5 | 3 | 10 | 3 | 1 (Note: Appearances in Recopa Sudamericana) | 0 | 46 | 11 |
| Athletico Paranaense | 2023 | Série A | 25 | 7 | 16 | 9 | 4 | 0 | 6 | 0 | — | | 51 | 16 |
| Athletico Paranaense | 2024 | Série A | 29 | 3 | 14 | 7 | 4 | 0 | 6 | 1 | — | | 53 | 11 |
| Athletico Paranaense | Total | | 79 | 14 | 35 | 17 | 13 | 3 | 22 | 4 | 1 | 0 | 129 | 36 |
| Sport Recife | 2025 | Série A | 21 | 3 | 8 (Note: Appearances in Campeonato Pernambucano) | 5 | 1 | 0 | — | | 4 (Note: Appearances in Copa do Nordeste) | 1 | 34 | 9 |
| Career total | | | 244 | 67 | 108 | 39 | 45 | 11 | 59 | 14 | 8 | 2 | 544 | 133 |

== Honours ==
=== Club ===
Atlético Paranaense

- Campeonato Paranaense: 2016, 2023
- Copa Sudamericana: 2018

São Paulo

- Campeonato Paulista: 2021

Sport Recife

- Campeonato Pernambucano: 2025

=== Individual ===
- Copa Sudamericana Top goalscorer: 2018
- Campeonato Paranaense Top goalscorer:2023
