= Igor Liziero =

Brazilian footballer (born 1998)

Personal information
- Full name: Igor Matheus Liziero Pereira
- Date of birth: 7 February 1998 (age 28)
- Place of birth: Jales, Brazil
- Height: 1.75 m (5 ft 9 in)
- Position: Midfielder

Team information
- Current team: Nacional
- Number: 28

Youth career
- 2011–2018: São Paulo

Senior career*
Years	Team	Apps	(Gls)
2018–2025	São Paulo	134	(5)
2022	→ Internacional (loan)	28	(0)
2023	→ Coritiba (loan)	17	(0)
2023–2024	→ Yverdon-Sport (loan)	29	(3)
2025–	Nacional	28	(0)

International career^{‡}
2021	Brazil U23	1	(0)
- * Club domestic league appearances and goals as of 25 May 2026 ‡ National team caps and goals as of 8 June 2021

Igor Matheus Liziero Pereira (born 7 February 1998), known as Liziero, is a Brazilian professional footballer who plays as central midfielder for Primeira Liga club Nacional.

== Career ==
=== São Paulo ===
Liziero made his debut in the senior team on 11 March 2018. After three games coming off the bench, Liziero got into the starting XI on 20 March 2018 against São Caetano.

Since he came up from the São Paulo youth team, which happened in 2018, he has played 132 matches, scored five goals and won the 2021 São Paulo Championship title.

=== Internacional ===
On January 8, 2022, Liziero was announced by Inter, loaned until the end of the year.

At the end of the season, Inter confirmed that it would not exercise the purchase option stipulated in the contract for Liziero to remain. With this, the 24-year-old midfielder returns to São Paulo after a lackluster season in Porto Alegre. For Inter, Liziero played 28 games 14 games as a starter and another 14 coming off the bench, with 1,232 minutes and failed to put in any good performances. He lost his place in the pecking order to Dourado. In the second half of the Brazilian Championship, he was given new opportunities, until he injured his knee in the final rounds.

=== Coritiba ===
On February 9, 2023, Coritiba confirmed the arrival, on loan, of midfielder Liziero, who belongs to São Paulo. The contract with Alviverde runs until the end of the season.

On August 29, 2023, Coritiba agreed to leave Liziero for Yverdon, in Switzerland. On loan from São Paulo, the player is not in Coxa's plans for the rest of the season. The midfielder's last match was against Flamengo, in the 20th round of Série A. Liziero arrived at Coritiba at the beginning of the year after being involved in a deal with Nathan Mendes. In total, he played 17 games and did not score any goals.

=== Yverdon ===
On 6 September 2023, Liziero joined Yverdon-Sport in Switzerland on loan with an option to buy.

During his time in Swiss football, Liziero demonstrated his technical quality, playing in 29 games, where he scored three goals and made five assists. His performance was quite satisfactory.

=== Return São Paulo ===
He ended up returning in June of this year, being reused in the squad by Luis Zubeldía. However, he was almost always on the bench and, once again, without many chances, he only played 11 matches in the last cycle of São Paulo, in the 1-1 draw between Tricolor and Criciúma. With no agreement to renew his contract, the 26-year-old midfielder was released by the club to negotiate his transfer.

=== Nacional ===
On 25 July 2025, Liziero signed a three season deal with Primeira Liga club Nacional ahead of the 2025–26 season.

== Career statistics ==
=== Club ===
As of match played 7 December 2025

Club	Season	League			State league		National cup (Note: Includes Copa do Brasil, Swiss Cup and Taça de Portugal)		Continental		Other		Total	
Club	Season	Division	Apps	Goals	Apps	Goals	Apps	Goals	Apps	Goals	Apps	Goals	Apps	Goals
São Paulo	2018	Série A	29	1	5 (Note: Appearance(s) in Campeonato Paulista)	0	2	0	3 (Note: Appearance(s) in Copa Sudamericana)	1	—		39	1
São Paulo	2019	Série A	21	0	8	1	0	0	0	0	—		29	1
São Paulo	2020	Série A	8	0	6	0	0	0	1 (Note: Appearance(s) in Copa Libertadores)	0	—		15	0
São Paulo	2021	Série A	29	1	8	1	4	0	7	0	—		48	2
São Paulo	2022	Série A	0	0	0	0	0	0	0	0	—		0	0
São Paulo	2023	Série A	0	0	2	0	0	0	0	0	—		2	0
São Paulo	2024	Série A	9	1	0	0	2	0	0	0	0	0	11	1
São Paulo	Total		96	3	29	2	8	0	11	0	0	0	144	5
Internacional (loan)	2022	Série A	14	0	9 (Note: Appearance(s) in Campeonato Gaúcho)	0	0	0	5	0	—		28	0
Coritiba (loan)	2023	Série A	10	0	4 (Note: Appearance(s) in Campeonato Paranaense)	0	2	0	—		—		16	0
Yverdon-Sport (loan)	2023–24	Swiss Super League	28	3	—		1	0	—		—		29	3
Nacional	2025–26	Primeira Liga	13	0	—		1	0	—		0	0	14	0
Career total			161	6	42	2	12	0	16	0	0	0	231	8

== Honours ==
São Paulo

- Campeonato Paulista: 2021
