= Igor Vinícius =

Brazilian footballer (born 1997)

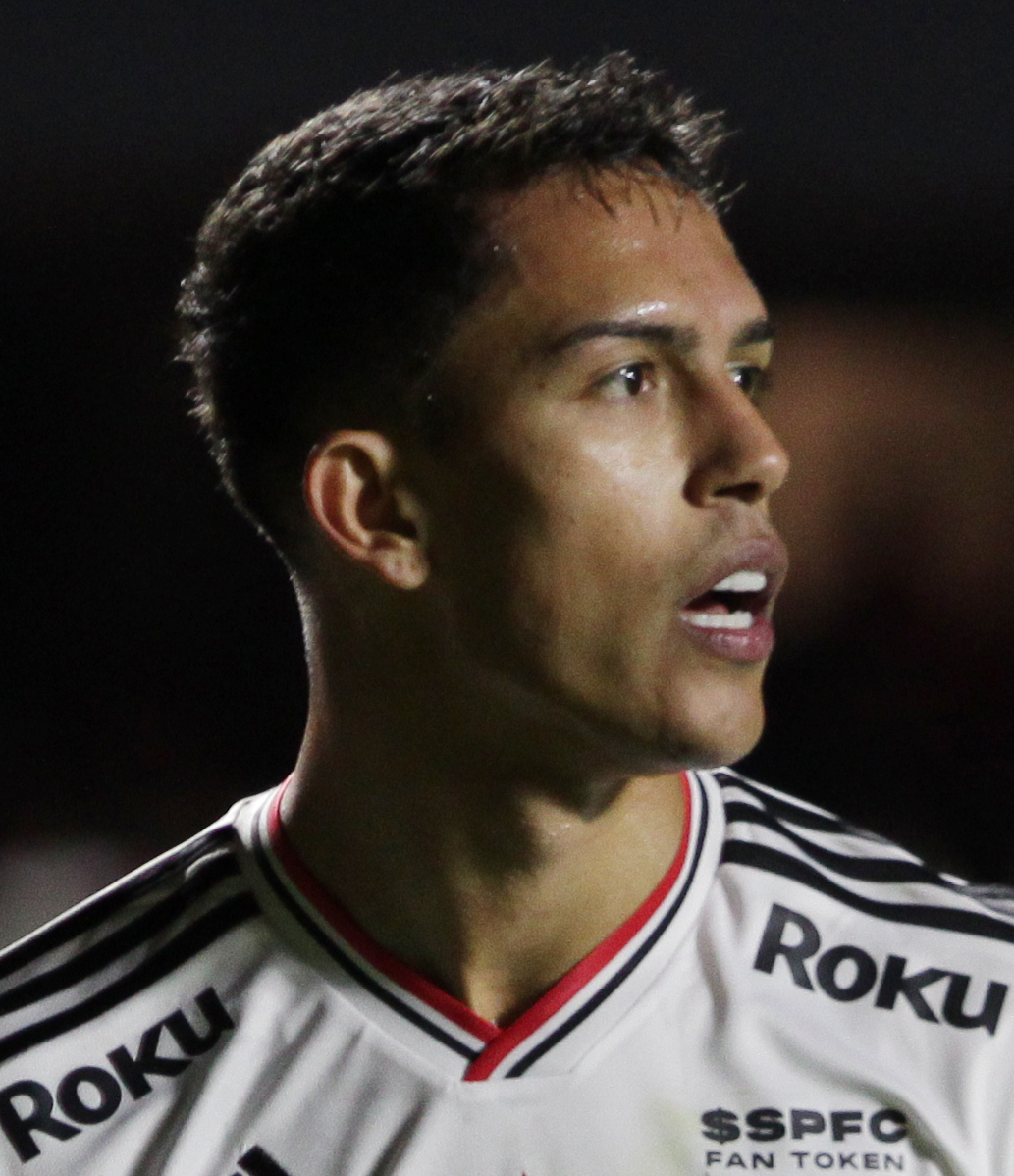
- Igor Vinícius playing for São Paulo in 2022

Personal information
- Full name: Igor Vinícius de Souza
- Date of birth: 1 April 1997 (age 29)
- Place of birth: Sinop, Brazil
- Height: 1.73 m (5 ft 8 in)
- Position: Right-back

Team information
- Current team: Santos
- Number: 18

Youth career
- 2010–2017: Santos
- 2017: Ituano

Senior career*
Years	Team	Apps	(Gls)
2016–2017	Santos	0	(0)
2018–2019	Ituano	14	(2)
2018	→ Ponte Preta (loan)	30	(0)
2019	→ São Paulo (loan)	27	(1)
2020–2025	São Paulo	156	(4)
2025–	Santos	47	(0)
- * Club domestic league appearances and goals as of 21:53, 29 October 2026 (UTC)

Igor Vinícius de Souza (born 1 April 1997), known as Igor Vinícius, is a Brazilian professional footballer who plays as a right-back for Campeonato Brasileiro Série A club Santos.

== Club career ==
=== Santos ===
Born in Sinop, Mato Grosso, Igor Vinícius joined Santos' youth setup in 2010, aged 12. After progressing through the club's youth setup, he was called up to the main squad for a Copa do Brasil match against Santos-AP on 20 April 2016.

Igor Vinícius made his professional debut on 21 April 2016, coming on as a half-time substitute for fellow youth graduate Leandrinho in the 1–1 draw at the Zerão. He featured in just one more match for the first team before leaving in August of the following year.

=== Ituano ===
In September 2017, Igor Vinícius signed with Ituano until the end of 2019, being initially assigned to the under-20s to build match fitness. A regular starter during the 2018 Campeonato Paulista, he scored his first senior goal on 17 January in a 3–1 home win against São Caetano.

==== Ponte Preta (loan) ====
On 27 March 2018, Igor Vinícius was loaned to Ponte Preta until the end of the season. He was an undisputed starter for Ponte during the year, contributing with 30 appearances as his side narrowly missed out promotion.

=== São Paulo ===
On 4 December 2018, Igor Vinícius signed a one-year loan deal with São Paulo. He made his debut for the club the following 3 February, starting in a 1–0 home win against São Bento.

Initially a first-choice, Igor Vinícius lost space to Hudson, during the latter stages of the 2019 Campeonato Paulista. He made his Série A debut on 27 April of that year, playing the full 90 minutes in a 2–0 home defeat of Botafogo.

Igor Vinícius scored his first goal in the top tier on 8 December 2019, netting his team's second in a 2–1 away success over CSA. Twelve days later, São Paulo bought 50% of his economic rights for a fee of R$ 2 million, and he signed a three-year deal with the club.

During the 2020 season, Igor Vinícius was a backup to Juanfran under head coach Fernando Diniz, and remained a backup in the following year under Hernán Crespo. In 2022, he was again a second-choice behind new signing Rafinha, but still renewed his contract until 2025 on 16 August of that year.

In January 2023, Igor Vinícius was sidelined due to a pubalgia, and spent the remainder of the season sidelined after undergoing two surgeries. Back to action in the following season, he was regularly used before losing space in 2025, as head coach Luis Zubeldía chose to deploy Nahuel Ferraresi as a starter and had Cédric Soares as a backup.

=== Return to Santos ===
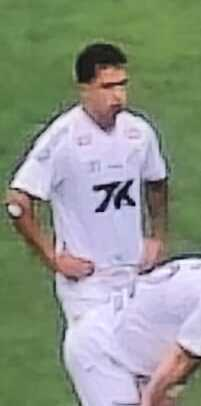
Igor Vinícius playing for Santos in 2025

On 1 July 2025, Santos announced the return of Igor Vinícius on a three-year contract until June 2028.

== Career statistics ==
As of 29 October 2026

Club	Season	League			State League		Cup		Continental		Other		Total	
Club	Season	Division	Apps	Goals	Apps	Goals	Apps	Goals	Apps	Goals	Apps	Goals	Apps	Goals
Santos	2016	Série A	0	0	—		2	0	—		—		2	0
Ituano	2018	Paulista	—		14	2	0	0	—		—		14	2
Ponte Preta (loan)	2018	Série B	30	0	—		3	0	—		—		33	0
São Paulo	2019	Série A	19	1	8	0	2	0	0	0	—		29	1
São Paulo	2020	Série A	26	0	4	0	1	0	3 (Note: Appearance(s) in Copa Libertadores)	0	—		34	0
São Paulo	2021	Série A	22	0	13	2	2	0	3	0	—		40	2
São Paulo	2022	Série A	23	1	5	1	8	1	12 (Note: Appearance(s) in Copa Sudamericana)	1	—		48	4
São Paulo	2023	Série A	0	0	2	0	0	0	0	0	—		2	0
São Paulo	2024	Série A	30	0	8	0	2	0	7	0	0	0	47	0
São Paulo	2025	Série A	3	0	10	0	0	0	1	0	—		14	0
São Paulo	Total		123	2	50	3	15	1	26	1	0	0	214	7
Santos	2025	Série A	20	0	—		—		—		—		20	0
Santos	2026	Série A	21	0	6	0	5	0	8	0	—		40	0
Santos	Total		41	0	6	0	5	0	8	0	—		60	0
Career total			194	2	70	5	24	1	34	1	0	0	323	9

== Honours ==
São Paulo

- Campeonato Paulista: 2021
- Copa do Brasil: 2023
- Supercopa do Brasil: 2024
