= Rafael Silva (footballer, born 1999) =

Brazilian footballer (born 1999)

Personal information
- Full name: Rafael Vinicius Ramos da Silva
- Date of birth: 12 May 1999 (age 27)
- Place of birth: Indaiatuba, Brazil
- Height: 1.74 m (5 ft 9 in)
- Position: Defensive midfielder

Youth career
- –2016: Primavera
- 2016–2019: São Paulo

Senior career*
Years	Team	Apps	(Gls)
2019–2022	São Paulo	0	(0)
2020	→ Cuiabá (loan)	6	(0)
2020	→ Brasil de Pelotas (loan)	17	(0)
2021	→ Santo André (loan)	3	(0)
2023	Boa Esporte	5	(1)
2024	Desportivo Brasil	11	(1)
2024	→ Inhumas (loan)	9	(0)
2025–	Inhumas	12	(1)
2025	→ Anápolis (loan)	5	(0)
- * Club domestic league appearances and goals as of 5 January 2026

Rafael Vinícius Ramos da Silva (born 12 May 1999), better known as Rafael Silva, is a Brazilian professional footballer who plays as a defensive midfielder.

== Career ==
Being part of the winning squad of the 2019 Copa SP, Rafael was promoted to professional in 2019, being listed for the match against CSA in the last round of the Brazilian Championship. In 2020 and loaned to Cuiabá EC and Brasil de Pelotas, where he competed in 2020 Campeonato Brasileiro Série B, alongside Danilo Gomes. In 2021 he was loaned to Santo André in the Campeonato Paulista dispute, returning to São Paulo at the end of the year, when he was again listed among the reserves in the final matches of the Campeonato Brasileiro.

After not being offered a new contract in the 2022 season, he was released at the beginning of 2023. He signed with Boa Esporte to compete in Campeonato Mineiro Módulo II.

On 14 November 2023, signed with Desportivo Brasil to 2024 season dispute of Campeonato Paulista Série A3. After a successful stint at Inhumas, where he won the second division of Goiás state, Rafael was acquired permanently by the club. In April, he was loaned to Anápolis for the 2025 Campeonato Brasileiro Série C.

== Honours ==
Inhumas

- Campeonato Goiano Second Division: 2024

São Paulo (youth)

- Copa São Paulo de Futebol Jr.: 2019
- Copa do Brasil Sub-20: 2018
- Supercopa do Brasil Sub-20: 2018
