= Igor Gomes (footballer, born 1999) =

Brazilian footballer (born 1999)

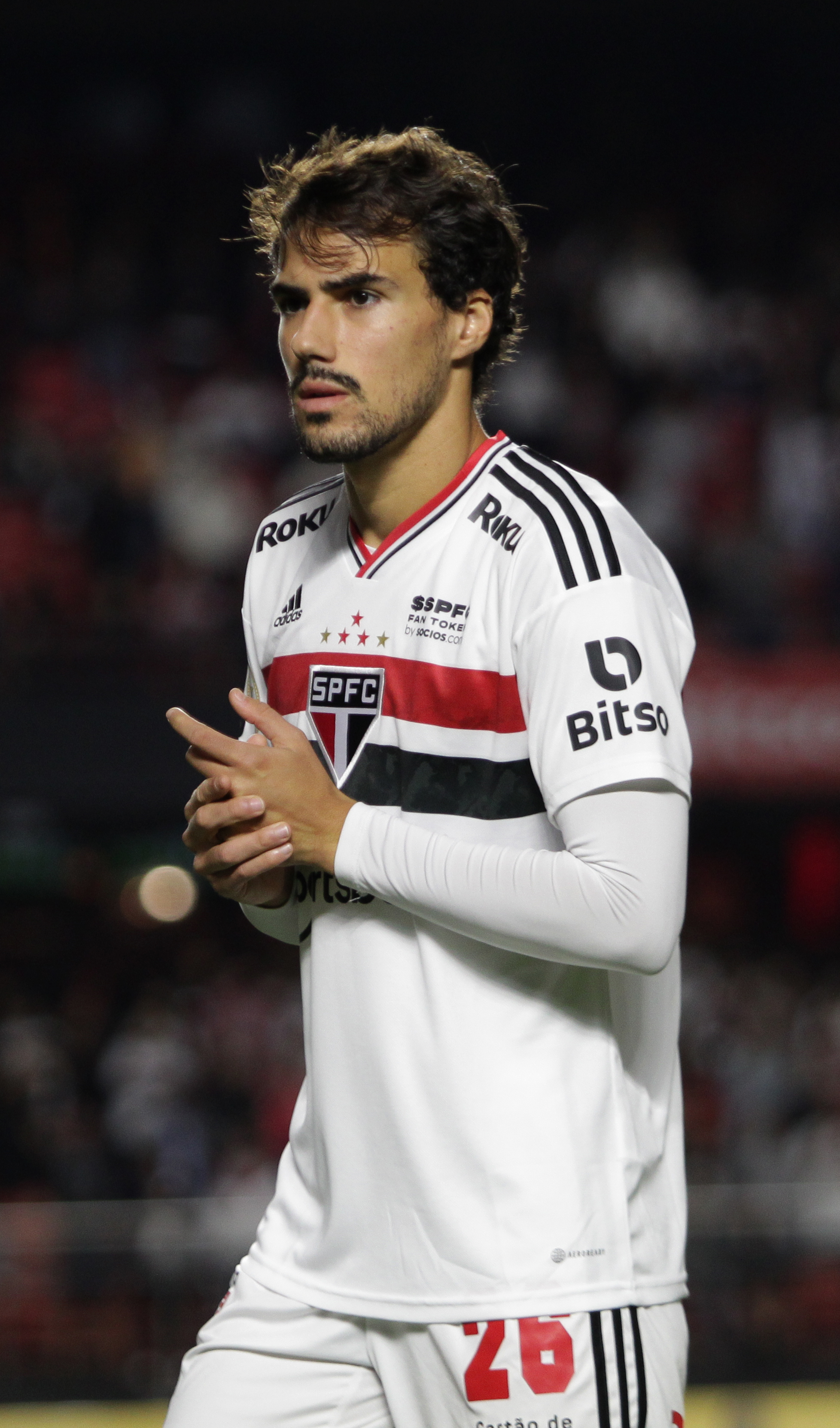
- Gomes with São Paulo in 2022

Personal information
- Full name: Igor Silveira Gomes
- Date of birth: 17 March 1999 (age 27)
- Place of birth: São José do Rio Preto, Brasil
- Height: 1.83 m (6 ft 0 in)
- Position: Midfielder

Team information
- Current team: Atlético Mineiro
- Number: 17

Youth career
- 2010–2012: América-SP
- 2012–2013: Tanabi
- 2013–2018: São Paulo

Senior career*
Years	Team	Apps	(Gls)
2018–2022	São Paulo	168	(10)
2023–	Atlético Mineiro	125	(8)

International career^{‡}
2017–2019	Brazil U20	11	(0)
2020	Brazil U23	7	(0)
- * Club domestic league appearances and goals as of 7 April 2026 ‡ National team caps and goals as of 8 February 2020

Igor Silveira Gomes (born 17 March 1999) is a Brazilian professional footballer who plays as a midfielder for Atlético Mineiro.

== Club career ==
=== São Paulo ===
Born in São José do Rio Preto, Gomes played youth football for América-SP and Tanabi, before joining São Paulo FC's academy at the age of 14. In 2018, he took part in the Copa do Brasil Sub-20-winning campaign. On 11 September 2018, his contract was extended until 31 March 2023.

On 26 September 2018, Gomes was promoted to the first team, making his debut as a professional on the following 26 November, as a second-half substitute for Felipe Araruna in a 0–0 draw to Sport in the national league. On 24 March 2019, he scored his first two goals in a 2–1 win over Ituano in the state league.

=== Atlético Mineiro ===
On 6 January 2023, Gomes joined Atlético Mineiro on a free transfer and a four-year contract. On 3 May, he scored a brace in a 2–0 win over Alianza Lima, his first goals for Atlético, in the third round of the Copa Libertadores group stage at the Arena Independência.

== International career ==
Gomes has been capped by Brazil at under-20 level, representing the team at the 2017 Toulon Tournament and the 2019 South American U-20 Championship. With the under-23s, he participated in the 2020 CONMEBOL Pre-Olympic Tournament, helping Brazil clinch qualification for the 2020 Summer Olympics.

== Career statistics ==
As of 7 December 2025

Appearances and goals by club, season and competition
Club	Season	League			State League		Cup		Continental		Other		Total	
Club	Season	Division	Apps	Goals	Apps	Goals	Apps	Goals	Apps	Goals	Apps	Goals	Apps	Goals
São Paulo	2017	Série A	0	0	—		0	0	—		3 (Note: Appearances in Copa Paulista)	0	3	0
São Paulo	2018	Série A	2	0	0	0	0	0	0	0	—		2	0
São Paulo	2019	Série A	27	2	7 (Note: Appearances in Campeonato Paulista)	2	2	0	0	0	—		36	4
São Paulo	2020	Série A	37	3	6	0	6	0	8 (Note: Six appearances and one goal in Copa Libertadores, two appearances in Copa Sudamericana)	1	—		57	4
São Paulo	2021	Série A	31	2	12	1	2	0	7 (Note: Appearances in Copa Libertadores)	0	—		52	3
São Paulo	2022	Série A	33	0	13	0	7	0	8 (Note: Appearances in Copa Sudamericana)	1	—		61	1
São Paulo	Total		130	7	38	3	17	0	23	2	3	0	211	12
Atlético Mineiro	2023	Série A	29	2	11 (Note: Appearances in Campeonato Mineiro)	0	3	0	10	3	—		53	5
Atlético Mineiro	2024	Série A	22	1	12	0	5	0	7	0	—		46	1
Atlético Mineiro	2025	Série A	34	8	5	0	8	0	13	0	—		60	5
Atlético Mineiro	Total		85	8	28	0	16	0	30	3	—		159	11
Career total			215	15	66	3	33	0	53	5	3	0	370	23

== Honours ==
São Paulo

- Campeonato Paulista: 2021

Atlético Mineiro

- Campeonato Mineiro: 2023, 2024, 2025
