= Léo Pelé =

Brazilian footballer

Léo
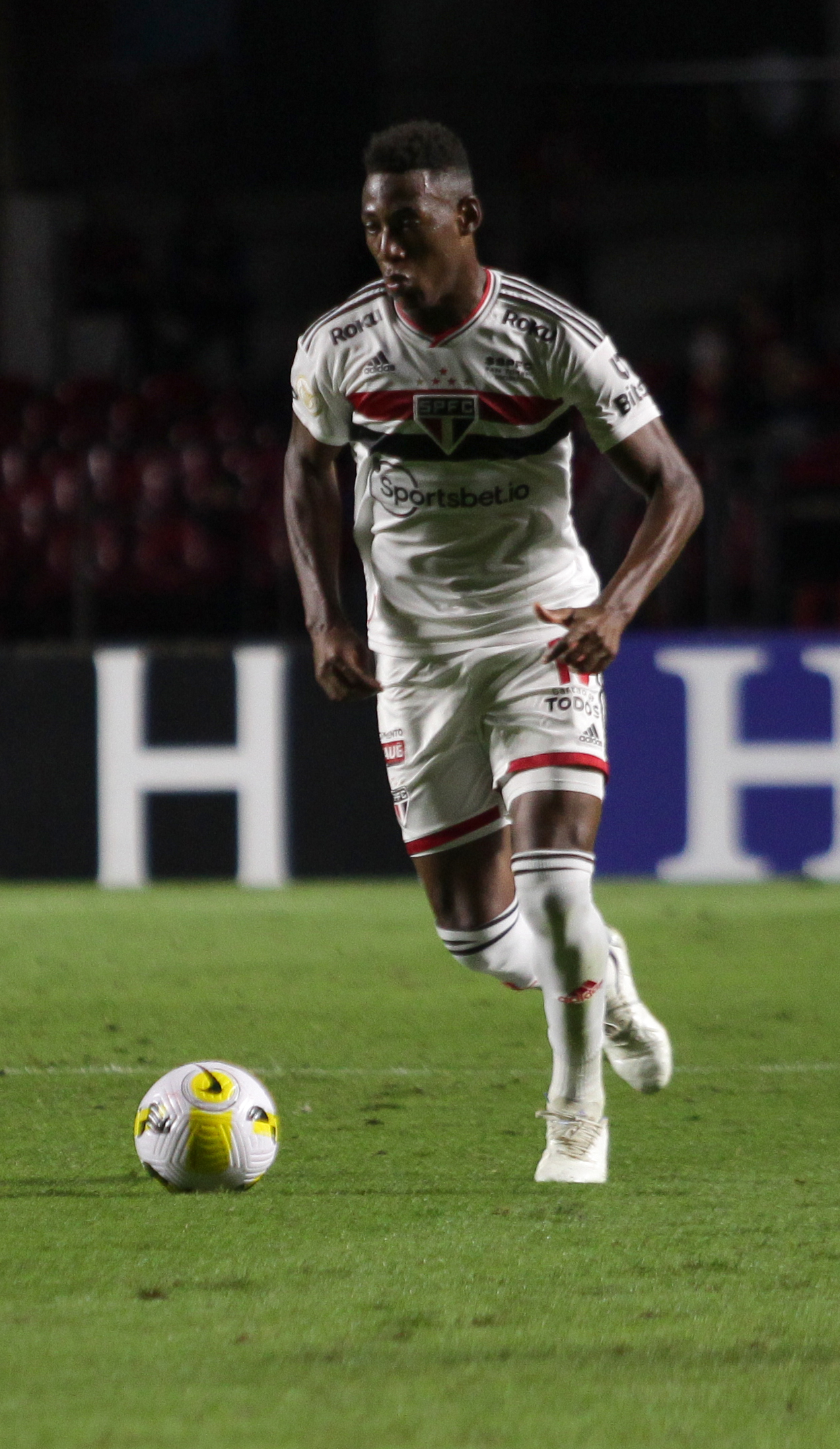

Personal information
- Full name: Leonardo Pinheiro Conceição
- Date of birth: 6 March 1996 (age 30)
- Place of birth: Rio de Janeiro, Brazil
- Height: 1.83 m (6 ft 0 in)
- Position: Centre-back

Team information
- Current team: Athletico Paranaense
- Number: 3

Youth career
- 2012–2015: Fluminense

Senior career*
Years	Team	Apps	(Gls)
2015–2018	Fluminense	44	(3)
2016	→ Londrina (loan)	28	(0)
2018	→ Bahia (loan)	43	(0)
2019–2022	São Paulo	123	(0)
2023–2024	Vasco da Gama	84	(2)
2025–	Athletico Paranaense	47	(1)
- * Club domestic league appearances and goals as of 15:26, 10 November 2026 (UTC)

Leonardo Pinheiro da Conceição (born 6 March 1996), known as Léo Pelé or simply Léo, is a Brazilian professional footballer who plays for Athletico Paranaense. Mainly a centre-back, he can also play as a left-back.

== Career ==
Léo began his career at Fluminense FC. He was first integrated into the first team towards the end of the 2013 Campeonato Brasileiro Série A, remaining an unused substitute in three matches starting with a 1–1 draw against AA Ponte Preta at the Maracanã Stadium on 19 October.

He made his professional debut in the same tournament two years later, playing the full 90 minutes as the team lost 1–0 at Sport Club do Recife on 13 September 2015; after the game, he and Marcos Júnior were castigated by fans who said "You need to bleed for the team...this isn’t Vasco". In total he made six appearances for Flu, all but one as a starter.

On 31 January 2016, he made his debut in the Campeonato Carioca, starting in a 3–1 loss at Volta Redonda Futebol Clube in the first game of the season. On 17 February, he was awarded a new contract until the end of 2019.

On 5 December 2018, Léo Pelé moved to São Paulo FC on a four-year deal for a fee of $3 million.

On 21 December 2022, Léo Pelé was transferred to Vasco da Gama in a R$16 million deal for a three-year contract. For the 2025 season, he moved to Athletico Paranaense, after the club paid a R$12.3 million fee for his transfer.

== Career statistics ==
As of 10 November 2026

Club	Season	League			State League		National Cup		Continental		Other		Total	
Club	Season	Division	Apps	Goals	Apps	Goals	Apps	Goals	Apps	Goals	Apps	Goals	Apps	Goals
Fluminense	2015	Série A	6	0	0	0	2	0	—		0	0	8	0
Fluminense	2016	Série A	0	0	2	0	0	0	0	0	—		2	0
Fluminense	2017	Série A	22	1	14	2	8	0	5 (Note: Appearance(s) in Copa Sudamericana)	0	2 (Note: Appearance(s) in Primeira Liga)	0	51	3
Fluminense	Total		28	1	16	2	10	0	5	0	2	0	61	3
Londrina (loan)	2016	Série B	28	0	—		—		—		—		28	0
Bahia (loan)	2018	Série A	32	0	11	0	3	0	5	0	9 (Note: Appearance(s) in Copa do Nordeste)	0	60	0
São Paulo	2019	Série A	5	0	9	0	1	0	0	0	—		15	0
São Paulo	2020	Série A	20	0	2	0	4	0	5 (Note: Four appearances in Copa Libertadores, one appearance in Copa Sudamericana)	0	—		31	0
São Paulo	2021	Série A	32	0	15	0	5	0	6 (Note: Appearance(s) in Copa Libertadores)	0	—		58	0
São Paulo	2022	Série A	29	0	11	0	9	0	9	0	—		58	0
São Paulo	Total		86	0	37	0	19	0	20	0	—		162	0
Vasco da Gama	2023	Série A	34	0	10	1	2	0	—		—		46	1
Vasco da Gama	2024	Série A	30	0	10	1	9	0	—		—		49	1
Vasco da Gama	Total		64	0	20	2	11	0	—		—		95	2
Athletico Paranaense	2025	Série B	27	1	13	0	5	0	—		—		45	1
Athletico Paranaense	2026	Série A	3	0	4	0	0	0	—		—		7	0
Athletico Paranaense	Total		30	1	17	0	5	0	—		—		52	1
Career total			268	2	101	4	48	0	30	0	11	0	448	5

== Honours ==
São Paulo

- Campeonato Paulista: 2021
