= Lucas Perri =

Brazilian footballer (born 1997)

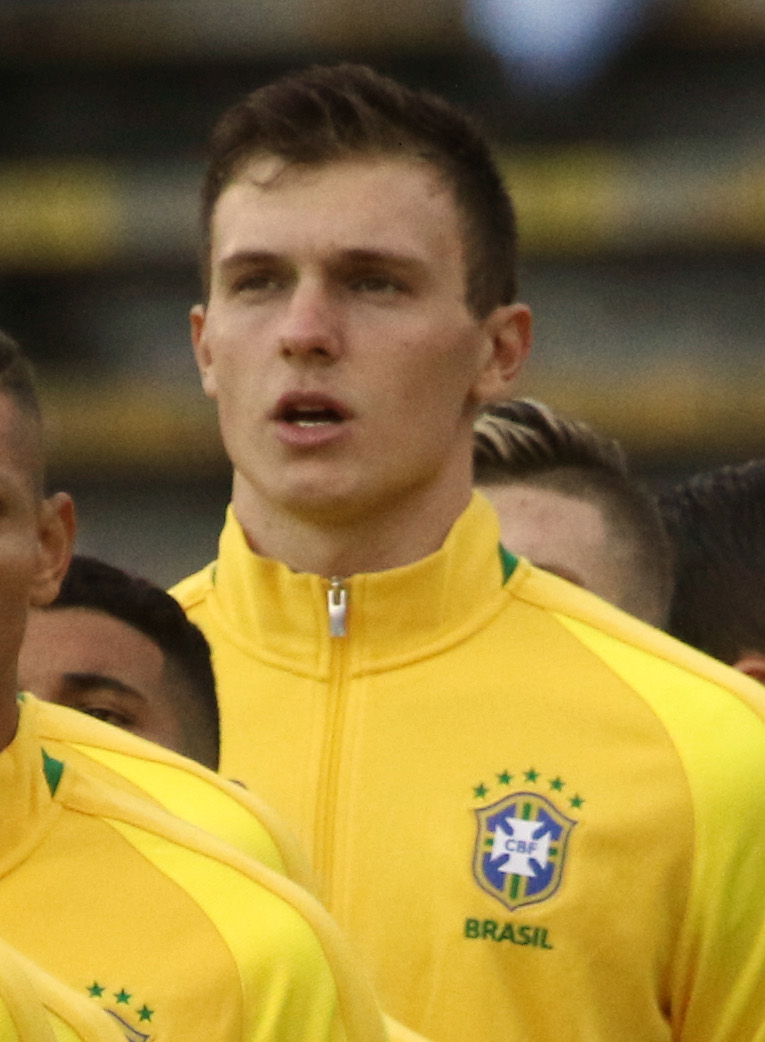
- Perri with Brazil U20 in 2017

Personal information
- Full name: Lucas Estella Perri
- Date of birth: 10 December 1997 (age 28)
- Place of birth: Campinas, São Paulo, Brazil
- Height: 1.97 m (6 ft 6 in)
- Position: Goalkeeper

Team information
- Current team: Torino (on loan from Leeds United)
- Number: 20

Youth career
- –2013: Ponte Preta
- 2013–2019: São Paulo

Senior career*
Years	Team	Apps	(Gls)
2018–2022	São Paulo	5	(0)
2019	→ Crystal Palace (loan)	0	(0)
2022	→ Náutico (loan)	33	(0)
2022–2023	Botafogo	54	(0)
2024–2025	Lyon	33	(0)
2025–	Leeds United	16	(0)
2026–	→ Torino (loan)	9	(0)

International career^{‡}
2016–2017	Brazil U20	5	(0)
2019	Brazil U23	1	(0)
2026–	Brazil	1	(0)
- * Club domestic league appearances and goals as of 14 November 2026 ‡ National team caps and goals as of 17 November 2026 (UTC)

Lucas Estella Perri (Brazilian Portuguese: [ˈlukɐs ˈpɛʁi]; born 10 December 1997) is a Brazilian professional footballer who plays as a goalkeeper for Serie A club Torino, on loan from Premier League club Leeds United, and the Brazil national team.

Formed at São Paulo, Perri did not make his senior debut until the age of 22 and barely played, having loan moves to Crystal Palace in England where he likewise did not play at all, and Náutico where he won the Campeonato Pernambucano and played in the Campeonato Brasileiro Série B in 2022. The same year in August, Perri signed for Botafogo, where he became a regular footballer in Campeonato Brasileiro Série A. In January 2024, Perri joined French club Lyon, where he became the starting goalkeeper in his second season. Perri joined English club Leeds United in July 2025.

== Club career ==
=== São Paulo ===
Born in Campinas, São Paulo, Perri began his career at Ponte Preta. In 2013, he joined São Paulo in a transfer that saw the club face accusations of an improper approach. In March 2015, 17-year-old Perri began training with the first team when Denis, the back-up to veteran goalkeeper Rogério Ceni, suffered a right-shoulder injury with a prognosis of six months.

In January 2019, Perri was loaned to Crystal Palace of the English Premier League until the end of the season. The move was facilitated by the player's possession of an Italian passport through his ancestry. He was completely unused by manager Roy Hodgson, who did not take up the option to make the deal permanent by purchasing 80% of his economic rights for €4.5 million; he was then linked to Sporting CP of Portugal and Galatasaray in Turkey.

Perri did not make his debut until 8 December 2019, when on the last day of the Campeonato Brasileiro Série A season, he played the entirety of a 2–1 win at relegated CSA. Having just turned 22, he completed his childhood dream of representing the club. Excluding games for the under-20 team in the Copa Paulista, he played only nine times for the Tricolor, including 30 minutes on 11 March 2020 in a 3–0 home win over LDU Quito in the group stage of the Copa Libertadores when Tiago Volpi injured his hand. He played three games in the Campeonato Paulista in 2021 as his team lifted the title.

For the year 2022, Perri was loaned to Náutico. First-choice, he won the Campeonato Pernambucano, defeating Retrô on penalties in the final. On 26 June, in a Campeonato Brasileiro Série B game away to Tombense, he was sent off early in the second half and the opposition drew the game 1–1 with a penalty in added time.

=== Botafogo ===
On 17 August 2022, Perri signed for Botafogo in the top flight until the end of 2025. He was initially back-up to Gatito Fernández, but was chosen by manager Luís Castro when the Paraguayan veteran suffered an injury in November.

==== Lawsuit against Botafogo ====
On September 3, 2025, Perri filed a lawsuit with the Labor Court of Rio de Janeiro against Botafogo. He is claiming €440,000 for contractual obligations and labor rights that the Brazilian club allegedly failed to respect. According to the Brazilian press, the player tried to resolve the dispute amicably before filing the lawsuit.

=== Lyon ===
On 5 January 2024, Perri signed for Ligue 1 club Lyon on a contract until 30 June 2028. Botafogo received a transfer fee of €3.25 million, in addition to a sell-on clause of 50%.

Perri was back-up to veteran Anthony Lopes in the league season, and made his debut on 7 February 2024 in the last 16 of the Coupe de France, a 2–1 home win over Lille. He remained in goal for the rest of the cup run, which ended with a 2–1 loss to Paris Saint-Germain in the final. During the start of the 2024–25 season, Perri was promoted to first-choice goalkeeper, succeeding Lopes, who was demoted to third-choice goalkeeper under Rémy Descamps.

=== Leeds United ===
On 26 July 2025, Perri reached an agreement to leave Lyon and join newly promoted Premier League side Leeds United. According to the French media, the total deal was worth approximately €15 million (R$97.5 million at the exchange rate of the day), including bonuses.

On 5 April 2026, in the FA Cup quarter-finals, Perri saved two penalty kicks in a penalty shootout against West Ham to help Leeds United advance to the FA Cup Semi-Finals at Wembley Stadium for the first time since 1987.

On 29 August 2026, Perri joined Serie A side Torino on a season long loan.

== International career ==
In September 2023, Perri received his first call-up to the Brazil national team for the 2026 FIFA World Cup qualification games against Bolivia and Peru.

Perri then make his international debut in a 7–0 win over Singapore on 18 November 2026 at the Singapore National Stadium.

== Career statistics ==
As of match played 7 November 2026

Appearances and goals by club, season, and competition
Club	Season	League			State league (Note: Includes Campeonato Paulista, Campeonato Pernambucano, Campeonato Carioca)		National cup (Note: Includes Copa do Brasil, Coupe de France, FA Cup)		Continental		Other		Total	
Club	Season	Division	Apps	Goals	Apps	Goals	Apps	Goals	Apps	Goals	Apps	Goals	Apps	Goals
São Paulo	2016	Série A	0	0	—		—		0	0	11 (Note: Appearances in Copa Paulista)	0	11	0
São Paulo	2017	Série A	0	0	—		—		0	0	10	0	10	0
São Paulo	2018	Série A	0	0	0	0	0	0	0	0	—		0	0
São Paulo	2019	Série A	1	0	0	0	0	0	0	0	—		1	0
São Paulo	2020	Série A	0	0	1	0	0	0	0	0	—		1	0
São Paulo	2021	Série A	0	0	3	0	1	0	0	0	—		4	0
São Paulo	Total		1	0	4	0	1	0	0	0	21	0	27	0
Crystal Palace (loan)	2018–19	Premier League	0	0	—		0	0	—		—		0	0
Náutico (loan)	2022	Série B	22	0	11	0	1	0	—		10 (Note: Appearances in Copa do Nordeste)	0	44	0
Botafogo	2022	Série A	4	0	—		—		—		—		4	0
Botafogo	2023	Série A	38	0	12	0	6	0	7 (Note: Appearances in Copa Sudamericana)	0	—		63	0
Botafogo	Total		42	0	12	0	6	0	7	0	—		67	0
Lyon	2023–24	Ligue 1	0	0	—		4	0	—		—		4	0
Lyon	2024–25	Ligue 1	33	0	—		1	0	11 (Note: Appearances in UEFA Europa League)	0	—		45	0
Lyon	Total		33	0	—		5	0	11	0	—		49	0
Leeds United	2025–26	Premier League	16	0	—		4	0	—		0	0	20	0
Torino	2026–27	Serie A	9	0	—		1	0	—		—		10	0
Career total			123	0	27	0	18	0	18	0	31	0	222	0

== Honours ==
São Paulo

- Campeonato Paulista: 2021

Náutico

- Campeonato Pernambucano: 2022

Botafogo

- Taça Rio: 2023

Lyon

- Coupe de France runner-up: 2023–24
