= João Pedro Palmberg =

Brazilian footballer

Palmberg
Personal information
- Full name: João Pedro Gomes Palmberg
- Date of birth: 5 February 2003 (age 23)
- Place of birth: São Paulo, Brazil
- Height: 1.77 m (5 ft 10 in)
- Position: Attacking midfielder

Team information
- Current team: Real Murcia
- Number: 30

Youth career
- 2012–2014: Grêmio Osasco
- 2015–2024: São Paulo

Senior career*
Years	Team	Apps	(Gls)
2022–2024	São Paulo	1	(0)
2024–	Real Murcia	56	(5)
- * Club domestic league appearances and goals as of 10 June 2026

João Pedro Palmberg (born 5 February 2003), is a Brazilian professional footballer who plays as an attacking midfielder for Spanish club Real Murcia.

== Career ==
Palmberg played for São Paulo FC's youth teams from 2014 to 2024, being one of the highlights in the Copa São Paulo de Futebol Júnior. On 25 May 2022, he made his professional debut, in the 2022 Copa Sudamericana against Ayacucho.

After no longer being used in the professional squad, Palmberg was traded on 13 August 2024 to Real Murcia.

== Honours ==
São Paulo U17

- Copa do Brasil Sub-17: 2020
- Supercopa do Brasil Sub-17: 2020
- Campeonato Paulista Sub-17: 2019
