= Marcos Júnior (politician) =

Brazilian politician (born 2003)

Member of the Legislative Assembly of Tocantins
- Incumbent
- Assumed office 1 February 2027

Personal details
- Born: 10 July 2003 (age 23)
- Party: Podemos

Marcos Antonio Rodrigues Júnior (born 10 July 2003) is a Brazilian politician who was elected member of the Legislative Assembly of Tocantins in 2026. He has been a municipal councillor of Palmas since 2025.
