= Chico Bala =

Brazilian footballer (born 1993)

Personal information
- Full name: Wanderson Ronha Ferreira Porto
- Date of birth: 23 January 1993 (age 33)
- Place of birth: São Luís, Brazil
- Height: 1.75 m (5 ft 9 in)
- Position: Left back

Senior career*
Years	Team	Apps	(Gls)
2013	São José-MA	0	(0)
2014	Babaçu	0	(0)
2014	São José-MA	2	(1)
2015–2018	Moto Club	42	(1)
2017	→ Maranhão (loan)	11	(0)
2017	→ Horizonte (loan)	3	(0)
2018	→ Chapadinha (loan)	7	(0)
2019	Fluminense de Feira	8	(0)
2019	Maranhão	6	(0)
2019–2020	Juventude-MA	38	(0)
2021	4 de Julho	37	(1)
2021	Cordino	3	(0)
2021–2023	Tocantinópolis	50	(7)
2023–2024	Ferroviária	21	(1)
2024	CRAC	15	(0)
2024	São José-MA	2	(0)
2025–	Uberlândia	18	(1)
- * Club domestic league appearances and goals as of 14 September 2025

Wanderson Ronha Ferreira Porto (born 23 January 1993), better known as Chico Bala, is a Brazilian professional footballer who plays as a leftback.

== Career ==
Chico Bala was state champion twice with the Moto Club, but gained national attention when he was part of the 4 de Julho team that played in the 2021 Copa do Brasil. He was hired the following year by Tocantinópolis, where he again won two state championships.

In April 2023, it was announced by Ferroviária for the 2023 Campeonato Brasileiro Série D dispute. After played from CRAC and São José-MA in 2024 season, Bala signed with Uberlândia for 2025.

== Honours ==
Moto Club

- Campeonato Maranhense: 2016, 2018

Tocantinópolis

- Campeonato Tocantinense: 2022, 2023
