= Danilo Gomes (footballer, born 1999) =

Brazilian footballer (born 1999)

Personal information
- Full name: Danilo Gomes Magalhães
- Date of birth: 5 February 1999 (age 27)
- Place of birth: Palmas, Brazil
- Height: 1.74 m (5 ft 9 in)
- Position: Attacking midfielder

Team information
- Current team: Albirex Niigata
- Number: 17

Youth career
- 2013–2019: São Paulo

Senior career*
Years	Team	Apps	(Gls)
2017–2022	São Paulo	2	(0)
2020	→ Brasil de Pelotas (loan)	15	(1)
2020–2021	→ Atlético Goianiense (loan)	24	(1)
2021	→ Cuiabá (loan)	15	(0)
2022	→ Ponte Preta (loan)	14	(0)
2023–	Albirex Niigata	49	(3)
- * Club domestic league appearances and goals as of 16 September 2025

Danilo Gomes Magalhães (born 5 February 1999), known as Danilo Gomes or simply Danilo, is a Brazilian footballer who plays as an attacking midfielder for J1 League club Albirex Niigata.

== Career ==
On 17 March 2020, Danilo Gomes signed a contract extension until 31 December 2021.

Danilo Gomes made his Atlético Goianiense debut against Sport on 26 November 2020. On 28 May 2021, his loan with Atlético Goianiense expired and he returned to São Paulo.

On 14 January 2023, Danilo Gomes was announced at Albirex Niigata.

== Career statistics ==
=== Club ===
As of match played 5 July 2025

Appearances and goals by club, season and competition
Club	Season	League			State league		National cup		League cup		Continental		Other		Total	
Club	Season	Division	Apps	Goals	Apps	Goals	Apps	Goals	Apps	Goals	Apps	Goals	Apps	Goals	Apps	Goals
São Paulo	2017	Série A	0	0	—		0	0	—		—		6 (Note: Appearances in the Copa Paulista)	0	6	0
São Paulo	2019	Série A	1	0	0	0	0	0	—		—		—		1	0
São Paulo	2020	Série A	0	0	1	0	0	0	—		—		—		1	0
São Paulo	Total		1	0	1	0	0	0	—		—		6	0	8	0
Brasil de Pelotas (loan)	2020	Série B	15	1	—		1	0	—		—		—		16	1
Atlético Goianiense (loan)	2020	Série A	13	1	0	0	—		—		—		1 (Note: Appearance(s) in Copa Verde)	0	14	1
Atlético Goianiense (loan)	2021	Série A	0	0	11	0	2	2	—		6 (Note: Appearance(s) in Copa Sudamericana)	1	—		19	3
Atlético Goianiense (loan)	Total		13	1	11	0	2	2	—		6	1	1	0	33	4
Cuiabá (loan)	2021	Série A	14	0	—		—		—		—		1	0	15	0
Ponte Preta (loan)	2022	Série B	14	0	—		—		—		—		1	0	15	0
Albirex Niigata	2023	J1 League	14	0	—		2	1	5	0	—		—		21	1
Albirex Niigata	2024	J1 League	18	0	—		2	0	8	0	—		—		28	0
Albirex Niigata	2025	J1 League	17	3	—		1	0	1	0	—		—		19	3
Albirex Niigata	Total		49	3	—		5	1	14	0	—		—		68	4
Career total			92	5	12	0	8	3	14	0	6	1	8	0	140	9

== Honours ==
São Paulo

- Copa São Paulo de Futebol Jr.: 2019

Atlético Goianiense

- Campeonato Goiano: 2020
