= Luis Manuel Orejuela =

Colombian footballer (born 1995)

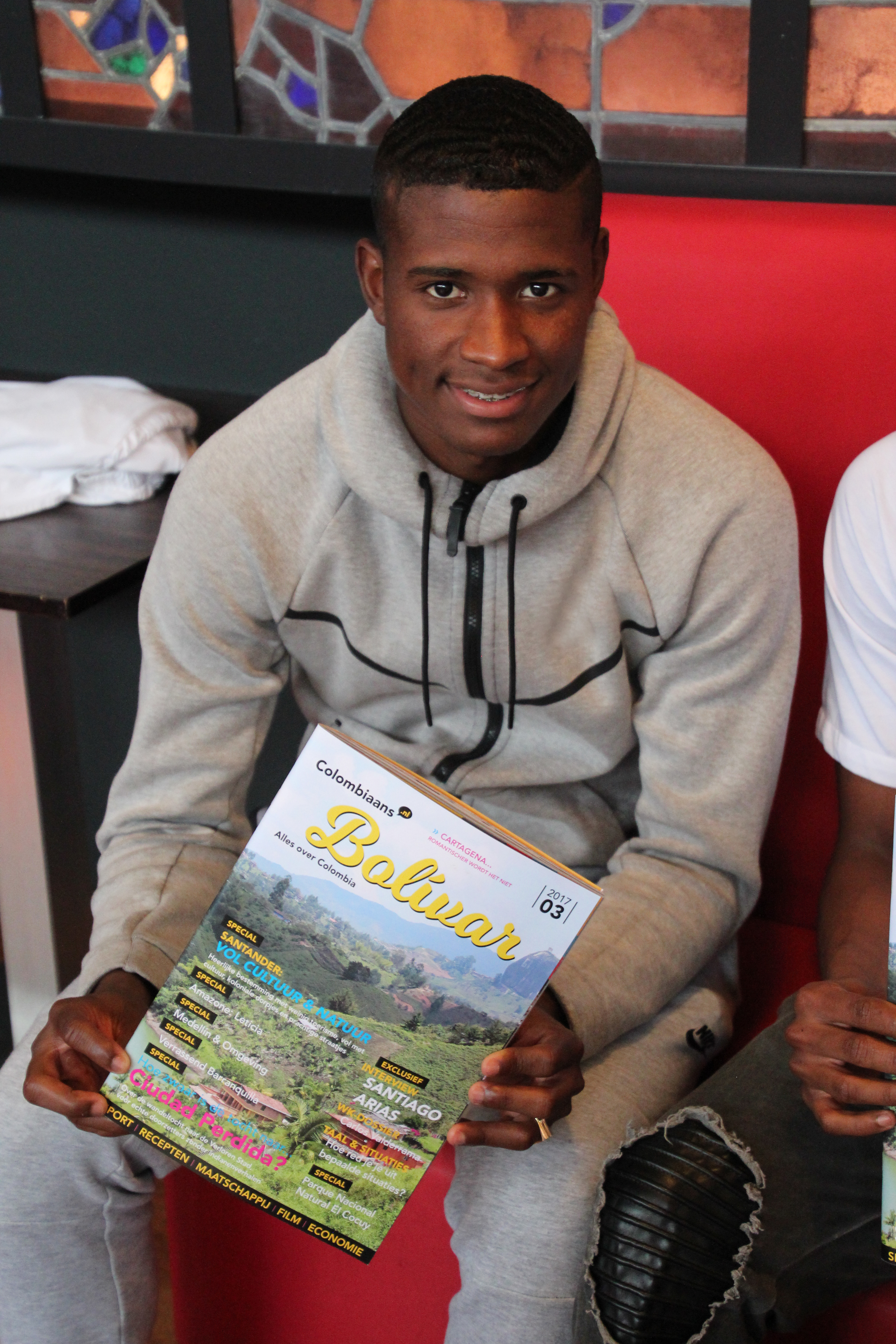

Personal information
- Full name: Luis Manuel Orejuela García
- Date of birth: 20 August 1995 (age 31)
- Place of birth: Cali, Colombia
- Height: 1.79 m (5 ft 10 in)
- Position: Right-back

Team information
- Current team: Deportivo Cali
- Number: 28

Youth career
- Recuerdos de Olimpia
- Deportivo Cali

Senior career*
Years	Team	Apps	(Gls)
2013–2017	Deportivo Cali	54	(3)
2017–2019	Jong Ajax	16	(1)
2017–2019	Ajax	1	(0)
2019	→ Cruzeiro (loan)	35	(2)
2020–2021	Cruzeiro	0	(0)
2020	→ Grêmio (loan)	18	(1)
2021–2025	São Paulo	9	(0)
2022	→ Grêmio (loan)	8	(0)
2022	→ Athletico Paranaense (loan)	15	(1)
2023	→ Ceará (loan)	0	(0)
2023–2024	→ Independiente Medellín (loan)	35	(1)
2025–	Deportivo Cali	17	(0)

International career^{‡}
2014–2015	Colombia U20	9	(0)
2019–2020	Colombia	5	(0)
- * Club domestic league appearances and goals as of 12 December 2025 ‡ National team caps and goals as of 22 June 2023

Luis Manuel Orejuela García (born 20 August 1995) is a Colombian professional footballer who plays as a right-back for Deportivo Cali.

== Club career ==
=== Deportivo Cali ===
Born in Cali, Orejuela represented Deportivo Cali as a youth. He made his first team debut on 7 August 2013 at the age of 18, starting in a 1–1 Copa Colombia away draw against Unión Magdalena.

Orejuela made his Categoría Primera A debut on 5 April 2014, playing the full 90 minutes in a 1–0 away loss against Millonarios. Initially a backup option, he became a regular starter for the club from the 2016 season onwards; he scored his first senior goal on 20 November of that year, netting the opener in a 3–1 away defeat of Rionegro Águilas.

=== Ajax ===
On 11 August 2017, Orejuela moved abroad and signed a five-year contract with Eredivisie side Ajax. Initially assigned to the reserves in Eerste Divisie, he made his first team debut on 20 September, starting in a 5–1 away routing of SVV Scheveningen for the KNVB Cup.

Orejuela made his debut in the Eredivisie on 17 December 2017, coming on as a half-time substitute for Deyovaisio Zeefuik in a 2–1 away win over AZ Alkmaar.

=== Cruzeiro ===
On 8 January 2019, Orejuela joined Cruzeiro on loan until December. Initially a backup to Edílson, he became a regular starter as his side suffered relegation for the first time in the club's history. At the end of the year, Cruzeiro exercised their option to sign Orejuela, paying $1.5 million for 50% of his rights.

==== Grêmio (loan) ====
On 17 January 2020, Orejuela joined Grêmio on loan.

=== São Paulo ===
On 11 March 2021, Orejuela signed with São Paulo.

== International career ==
Orejuela represented Colombia at under-20 level before receiving a call up to the full side on 13 March 2019, for two friendlies against Japan and South Korea. He made his full international debut on 26 March, starting in a 2–1 loss against the latter.

== Career statistics ==
=== Club ===
As of 16 September 2020.

Club	Season	League			Cup		Continental		Other		Total	
Club	Season	Division	Apps	Goals	Apps	Goals	Apps	Goals	Apps	Goals	Apps	Goals
Deportivo Cali	2013	Categoría Primera A	0	0	1	0	—		—		1	0
Deportivo Cali	2014	Categoría Primera A	1	0	1	0	—		—		2	0
Deportivo Cali	2015	Categoría Primera A	4	0	2	0	—		—		6	0
Deportivo Cali	2016	Categoría Primera A	24	1	4	0	1 (Note: Appearance(s) in Copa Libertadores.)	0	—		29	1
Deportivo Cali	2017	Categoría Primera A	25	2	5	1	4 (Note: Appearance(s) in Copa Sudamericana.)	0	—		34	3
Deportivo Cali	Total		54	3	13	1	5	0	—		72	4
Jong Ajax	2017–18	Eerste Divisie	16	1	—		—		—		16	1
Ajax	2017–18	Eredivisie	1	0	3	0	0	0	—		4	0
Cruzeiro (loan)	2019	Série A	23	2	3	0	4	0	5 (Note: Appearance(s) in Campeonato Mineiro.)	0	35	2
Grêmio (loan)	2020	Série A	9	0	0	0	1	0	7 (Note: Appearance(s) in Campeonato Gaúcho.)	0	17	0
Career total			103	5	19	1	10	0	12	0	144	7

=== International ===
As of 17 December 2019

Colombia
Year	Apps	Goals
2019	4	0
Total	4	0

== Honours ==
Deportivo Cali

- Categoría Primera A: 2015 Apertura
- Superliga Colombiana: 2014

Jong Ajax

- Eerste Divisie: 2017–18

Cruzeiro

- Campeonato Mineiro: 2019

Grêmio

- Campeonato Gaúcho: 2020

São Paulo

- Campeonato Paulista: 2021
- Copa do Brasil: 2023
