= Marcos Júnior (footballer, born 2000) =

Brazilian footballer

Personal information
- Full name: Marcos Antonio Augusto Júnior
- Date of birth: 29 January 2000 (age 26)
- Place of birth: Santos, Brazil
- Height: 1.71 m (5 ft 7 in)
- Position: Defensive midfielder

Team information
- Current team: EC São Bernardo

Youth career
- 2015–2020: São Paulo

Senior career*
Years	Team	Apps	(Gls)
2020–2021	São Paulo	0	(0)
2021	→ Ponte Preta (loan)	29	(1)
2022	Ponte Preta	5	(0)
2023–2024	Botafogo-SP	6	(1)
2025–	EC São Bernardo		
- * Club domestic league appearances and goals as of 3 January 2025

Marcos Antonio Augusto Júnior (born 29 January 2000), better known as Marcos Júnior, is a Brazilian professional footballer who plays as a defensive midfielder for EC São Bernardo.

== Career ==
Revealed in the youth sectors of São Paulo FC, Marcos Júnior was part of the winning squad of the 2019 Copa SP de Futebol Jr. In 2021, without space in the professional team, he was loaned to AA Ponte Preta. On 2022, São Paulo released 50% of the athlete's federative rights to Ponte Preta, who signed definitively with the player.

To 2023 season, Marcos Júnior signed with Botafogo de Ribeirão Preto.

== Honours ==
São Paulo (youth)

- Copa São Paulo de Futebol Jr.: 2019
- Campeonato Brasileiro Sub-23: 2018
