= Denis Júnior =

Brazilian footballer

Personal information
- Full name: Denis de Oliveira Aguiar Júnior
- Date of birth: 10 August 1998 (age 28)
- Place of birth: Patos de Minas, Brazil
- Height: 1.89 m (6 ft 2 in)
- Position: Goalkeeper

Team information
- Current team: Ferroviária

Youth career
- 2012–2015: Mirassol
- 2015–2019: São Paulo

Senior career*
Years	Team	Apps	(Gls)
2017–2021	São Paulo	0	(0)
2021	→ Bahia (loan)	5	(0)
2022–2025	Bahia	2	(0)
2022	→ Confiança (loan)	0	(0)
2023–2024	→ Vila Nova (loan)	90	(0)
2025	→ Ferroviária (loan)	38	(0)
2026–	Ferroviária	26	(0)
- * Club domestic league appearances and goals as of 9 November 2026

Denis de Oliveira Aguiar Júnior (born 10 August 1998), known as Denis Júnior, is a Brazilian professional footballer who plays as a goalkeeper for Ferroviária.

== Career ==
A São Paulo FC youth graduate, Denis impressed with the under-17 squad during the 2015 Campeonato Paulista Sub-17 winning campaign. He was promoted to the first team squad in 2017, when he included the name "Júnior" since goalkeeper Denis was still on the club at the time. He played in three matches for a B-team in the 2017 Copa Paulista, and also played with the under-20s in the 2018 Copa São Paulo de Futebol Júnior.

On 12 March 2021, Denis Júnior was loaned to Bahia. He was mainly a backup option before signing a permanent two-year deal with the club in December of that year.

On 26 May 2022, Denis Júnior was loaned to Série C side Confiança, but his loan was cut short in July after he made no appearances for the club. On 27 December 2022, he was presented at Vila Nova.

Denis Júnior became a starter for Vila during the 2023 Série B, and renewed his contract with Bahia until 2026 on 15 December 2023; a new one-year loan deal was also agreed.

== Honours ==
São Paulo U17

- Campeonato Paulista Sub-17: 2015

Bahia

- Copa do Nordeste: 2021
