= Marcos Calazans =

Brazilian footballer

Personal information
- Full name: Marcos Vinicius Silva Rocha Calazans
- Date of birth: 14 June 1996 (age 30)
- Place of birth: Duque de Caxias, Brazil
- Height: 1.72 m (5 ft 7 1/2 in)
- Position: Winger

Team information
- Current team: Uberlândia
- Number: 7

Youth career
- Fluminense

Senior career*
Years	Team	Apps	(Gls)
2015–2019	Fluminense	36	(0)
2015	→ Slovan Liberec (loan)	4	(0)
2019–2021	São Paulo	4	(0)
2020–2021	→ CRB (loan)	2	(0)
2022–2023	Cianorte	3	(0)
2023	→ Bangu (loan)	9	(0)
2024	São José-RS	22	(3)
2025	São Joseense	12	(0)
2025	Goiatuba	17	(2)
2026	ABC	3	(0)
2026–	Uberlândia	21	(3)
- * Club domestic league appearances and goals as of 18:37, 22 February 2023 (UTC)

Marcos Vinicius Silva Rocha Calazans (born 14 June 1996), commonly known as Marcos Calazans or Marquinhos Calazans, is a Brazilian professional footballer who plays as a winger for Uberlândia.

== Career statistics ==
=== Club ===
As of 9 April 2019.

Club	Season	League			National Cup		League Cup		Continental		Other		Total	
Club	Season	Division	Apps	Goals	Apps	Goals	Apps	Goals	Apps	Goals	Apps	Goals	Apps	Goals
Fluminense	2015	Série A	0	0	0	0	0	0	–		0	0	0	0
Fluminense	2016	Série A	0	0	0	0	0	0	–		0	0	0	0
Fluminense	2017	Série A	11	0	4 (Note: Appearances in the Copa do Brasil)	0	1 (Note: Appearances in the Primeira Liga)	0	3 (Note: Appearances in the Copa Sudamericana)	0	5 (Note: Appearances in the Campeonato Carioca)	0	24	0
Fluminense	2018	Série A	1	0	0	0	0	0	–		9	0	10	0
Fluminense	2019	Série A	0	0	1	0	0	0	1	0	0	0	2	0
Fluminense	Total		12	0	5	0	1	0	4	0	14	0	36	0
Slovan Liberec	2014–15	Czech First League	4	0	0	0	–		–		0	0	4	0
Career total			16	0	5	0	1	0	4	0	14	0	40	0
