= Paulinho Bóia =

Brazilian footballer (born 1998)

Personal information
- Full name: Paulo Henrique Pereira da Silva
- Date of birth: 26 June 1998 (age 28)
- Place of birth: Brasília, Brazil
- Height: 1.71 m (5 ft 7 in)
- Position: Forward

Team information
- Current team: Widzew Łódź
- Number: 98

Youth career
- 2013–2017: São Paulo

Senior career*
Years	Team	Apps	(Gls)
2018–2022	São Paulo	15	(0)
2018–2019	→ Portimonense (loan)	5	(0)
2019	→ São Bento (loan)	24	(3)
2021	→ Juventude (loan)	20	(3)
2022–2023	Metalist Kharkiv	0	(0)
2022	→ América Mineiro (loan)	4	(0)
2022–2023	→ Kyoto Sanga (loan)	13	(1)
2023	→ América Mineiro (loan)	3	(0)
2024	Mirassol	9	(1)
2024–2025	Paysandu	18	(3)
2025–2026	Nacional	48	(5)
2026–	Widzew Łódź	0	(0)
- * Club domestic league appearances and goals as of 25 May 2026

Paulo Henrique Pereira da Silva (born 26 June 1998), commonly known as Paulinho, Paulinho Bóia or Paulo Bóia, is a Brazilian professional footballer who plays as a forward for Ekstraklasa club Widzew Łódź.

== Career statistics ==
As of 1 September 2023

Appearances and goals by club, season and competition
Club	Season	League			State league (Note: Includes Campeonato Paulista)		National cup (Note: Includes Copa do Brasil, Taça de Portugal, Emperor's Cup)		League cup (Note: Includes J.League Cup)		Continental		Other		Total	
Club	Season	Division	Apps	Goals	Apps	Goals	Apps	Goals	Apps	Goals	Apps	Goals	Apps	Goals	Apps	Goals
São Paulo	2017	Série A	0	0	—		—		—		—		—		0	0
São Paulo	2018	Série A	2	0	3	0	2	0	—		—		—		7	0
São Paulo	2020	Série A	13	0	3	1	2	0	—		4 (Note: Appearances in Copa Libertadores)	0	—		22	1
São Paulo	2021	Série A	0	0	0	0	0	0	—		2	0	—		2	0
São Paulo	Total		15	0	6	1	4	0	0	0	6	0	0	0	31	1
Portimonense (loan)	2018–19	Primeira Liga	5	0	—		1	0	—		—		—		6	0
São Bento (loan)	2019	Série B	24	3	—		—		—		—		—		24	3
Juventude (loan)	2021	Série A	20	3	—		—		—		—		—		20	3
América Mineiro (loan)	2022	Série A	4	0	0	0	1	0	—		4	0	—		9	0
Kyoto Sanga (loan)	2022	J1 League	6	1	—		2	2	0	0	—		0	0	8	3
Kyoto Sanga (loan)	2023	J1 League	7	0	—		0	0	2	0	—		—		9	0
Kyoto Sanga (loan)	Total		13	1	0	0	2	2	2	0	0	0	0	0	17	3
América Mineiro (loan)	2023	Série A	3	0	—		1	0	—		3 (Note: Appearances in Copa Sudamericana)	0	—		7	0
Mirassol	2024	Série B	—		9	1	—		—		—		—		9	1
Paysandu	2024	Série B	18	3	—		—		—		—		—		18	3
Nacional	2024–25	Primeira Liga	15	1	—		0	0	—		—		0	0	15	1
Nacional	2025–26	Primeira Liga	33	4	—		1	0	—		—		—		34	4
Nacional	Total		48	5	—		1	0	—		—		—		49	5
Widzew Łódź	2026–27	Ekstraklasa	0	0	—		0	0	—		—		—		0	0
Career total			150	15	15	2	10	2	2	0	13	0	0	0	190	19

== Honours ==
São Paulo

- Campeonato Paulista: 2021
