= 2023 São Paulo FC season =

São Paulo
2023 season
- Chairman: Julio Casares
- Manager: Rogério Ceni (until 19 April 2023); Dorival Júnior (from 20 April 2023)
- Stadium: Morumbi
- Campeonato Brasileiro Série A: 11th
- Campeonato Paulista: Quarter-final
- Copa do Brasil: Winners
- Copa Sudamericana: Quarter-finals
- Top goalscorer: League: Jonathan Calleri; Luciano (9 each); All: Luciano (15)
- Highest home attendance: 63,077 (vs. Flamengo, 24 September)
- Lowest home attendance: 16,827 (vs. Academia Puerto Cabello, 18 April)
- Average home league attendance: 43,780
Home colors	Away colors	Third colors

The 2023 season was São Paulo's 94th season in the club's history and their 63rd in the top-flight of Brazilian football. Along with Série A, São Paulo competed in the Campeonato Paulista, Copa do Brasil and Copa Sudamericana.

== First-team squad ==
As of 29 July 2023

Note: Flags indicate national team as defined under FIFA eligibility rules; some limited exceptions apply. Players may hold more than one non-FIFA nationality.

No.	Pos.	Nation	Player
1	GK	BRA	Felipe Alves (on loan from Fortaleza)
2	DF	BRA	Igor Vinícius
3	DF	VEN	Nahuel Ferraresi (on loan from Manchester City)
4	DF	BRA	Diego Costa
5	DF	ECU	Robert Arboleda
6	DF	BRA	Welington
7	FW	BRA	Lucas Moura
8	MF	BRA	Luan
9	FW	ARG	Jonathan Calleri (vice-captain)
10	FW	BRA	Luciano
11	MF	BRA	Rodrigo Nestor
12	FW	BRA	Alexandre Pato
13	DF	BRA	Rafinha (captain)
14	MF	ARG	Giuliano Galoppo
15	MF	URU	Michel Araújo (on loan from Fluminense)
18	MF	BRA	Rodriguinho
19	MF	COL	James Rodríguez
20	MF	URU	Gabriel Neves
21	MF	ECU	Jhegson Méndez

No.	Pos.	Nation	Player
22	FW	BRA	David (on loan from Internacional)
23	GK	BRA	Rafael
25	MF	BRA	Alisson
27	MF	BRA	Wellington Rato
28	DF	ARG	Alan Franco
29	MF	BRA	Pablo Maia
30	DF	BRA	Moreira
31	FW	BRA	Juan
32	FW	POR	Marcos Paulo (on loan from Atlético Madrid)
34	DF	BRA	Raí Ramos
35	DF	BRA	Lucas Beraldo
36	DF	BRA	Patryck Lanza
37	MF	BRA	Talles Costa
38	DF	BRA	Caio Paulista (on loan from Fluminense)
43	DF	BRA	Walce
45	DF	BRA	Nathan
49	FW	BRA	Erison (on loan from Botafogo)
50	GK	BRA	Young
93	GK	BRA	Jandrei

=== Youth players with first team numbers ===
As of 12 November 2023

Note: Flags indicate national team as defined under FIFA eligibility rules; some limited exceptions apply. Players may hold more than one non-FIFA nationality.

No.	Pos.	Nation	Player
25	FW	BRA	Talles Wander
26	FW	GHA	King Faisal
33	FW	BRA	Caio Matheus
39	MF	BRA	William Gomes
1 / 40	GK	BRA	Leandro (at Campeonato Brasileiro)
40	FW	BRA	Gabriel Maioli (at Copa Sudamericana)
41	MF	SEN	Iba Ly

No.	Pos.	Nation	Player
42	DF	BRA	Kaiky Carvalho
43	DF	BRA	Ythallo
44	DF	BRA	Belém
46	MF	BRA	Felipe Negrucci
47	MF	BRA	Pedrinho Vilhena
48	FW	NGR	Azeez Balogun

=== Other players under contract ===
Note: Flags indicate national team as defined under FIFA eligibility rules; some limited exceptions apply. Players may hold more than one non-FIFA nationality.

No. / Pos. / Nation / Player; — / DF / BRA / Guilherme Matheus	No. / Pos. / Nation / Player; — / MF / BRA / Gabriel Falcão

=== Out on loan ===
Note: Flags indicate national team as defined under FIFA eligibility rules; some limited exceptions apply. Players may hold more than one non-FIFA nationality.

No.	Pos.	Nation	Player
—	GK	BRA	Thiago Couto (at Juventude until 31 December 2023)
—	DF	COL	Luis Manuel Orejuela (at Independiente Medellín until 31 December 2024)
—	MF	BRA	Léo Silva (at CRB until 31 December 2023)

No.	Pos.	Nation	Player
—	MF	BRA	Liziero (at Yverdon-Sport until 30 June 2025)
—	MF	BRA	Nikão (at Cruzeiro until 31 December 2023)
—	FW	BRA	Gabriel Stevanato (at Ituano until 31 December 2023)

=== Retired numbers ===
- 01 – (Brazil) Rogério Ceni, Goalkeeper (1990–2015)

== Transfers ==
=== Transfers in ===
Entry date	Position	No.	Player	From club	Fee	Ref.
15 November 2022	MF	20	(Uruguay) Gabriel Neves	(Uruguay) Nacional	R$8,0M	
7 December 2022	GK	23	(Brazil) Rafael	(Brazil) Atlético Mineiro	R$5,0M	
14 December 2022	MF	27	(Brazil) Wellington Rato	(Brazil) Atlético Goianiense	R$5,0M	
14 December 2022	MF	19	(Brazil) Liziero	(Brazil) Internacional	End of loan	
14 December 2022	DF	17	(Colombia) Luis Orejuela	(Brazil) Athletico Paranaense	End of loan	
5 January 2023	DF	28	(Argentina) Alan Franco	(United States) Atlanta United	Undisclosed	
9 January 2023	MF	21	(Ecuador) Jhegson Méndez	(United States) Los Angeles FC	Free transfer	
4 February 2023	DF	45	(Brazil) Nathan	(Brazil) Coritiba	End of loan	
24 March 2023	DF	34	(Brazil) Raí Ramos	(Brazil) Ituano	Undisclosed	
6 April 2023	DF	–	(Brazil) Anílson	(Brazil) Náutico	End of loan	
30 April 2023	DF	–	(Brazil) Pedro Lucas	(Brazil) Paranoá	End of loan	
23 May 2023	DF	–	(Brazil) Walce	(Brazil) Juventude	End of loan	
26 May 2023	FW	12	(Brazil) Alexandre Pato	Free agent	Free transfer	
29 July 2023	MF	19	(Colombia) James Rodríguez	(Greece) Olympiacos	Free transfer	
1 August 2023	FW	7	(Brazil) Lucas Moura	(England) Tottenham	Free transfer	

=== Loans in ===
Entry date	Position	No.	Player	From club	Fee	Ref.
7 December 2022	FW	12	(Brazil) Pedrinho	(Russia) Lokomotiv Moscow	None	
28 December 2022	FW	32	(Portugal) Marcos Paulo	(Spain) Atlético Madrid	None	
16 January 2023	FW	22	(Brazil) David	(Brazil) Internacional	R$1,2M	
23 January 2023	DF	38	(Brazil) Caio Paulista	(Brazil) Fluminense	R$0,5M	
1 February 2023	FW	49	(Brazil) Erison	(Brazil) Botafogo	None	
29 March 2023	MF	15	(Uruguay) Michel Araújo	(Brazil) Fluminense	None	

=== Transfers out ===
Entry date	Position	No.	Player	To club	Fee	Ref.
10 November 2022	DF	–	(Brazil) Miranda	Retired	Contract terminated by mutual consent	
11 November 2022	FW	23	(Italy) Éder	(Brazil) Criciúma	Contract terminated by mutual consent	
13 November 2022	DF	22	(Brazil) Reinaldo	(Brazil) Grêmio	End of contract	
14 November 2022	FW	–	(Brazil) Marcos Guilherme	Unattached	End of contract	
14 November 2022	MF	–	(Colombia) Andrés Colorado	(Colombia) Cortuluá	End of loan	
24 November 2022	FW	–	(Argentina) Nahuel Bustos	(England) Manchester City	End of loan	
5 December 2022	DF	–	(Brazil) Luizão	(England) West Ham United	End of contract	
12 December 2022	GK	–	(Brazil) Rokenedy	(Brazil) Maguary-PE	End of contract	
15 December 2022	MF	–	(Brazil) Danilo Gomes	(Japan) Albirex Niigata	End of contract	
20 December 2022	DF	3	(Brazil) Léo	(Brazil) Vasco da Gama	R$16,0M	
31 December 2022	MF	–	(Brazil) Rafael Silva	Unattached	End of contract	
2 January 2023	DF	–	(Brazil) Mateus Petri	(Brazil) XV de Piracicaba	End of loan	
6 January 2023	MF	17	(Brazil) Igor Gomes	(Brazil) Atlético Mineiro	Free transfer	
8 January 2023	MF	49	(Brazil) Patrick	(Brazil) Atlético Mineiro	R$5,3M	
18 April 2023	DF	–	(Brazil) Anílson	(Brazil) Ponte Preta	End of contract	
28 April 2023	FW	–	(Brazil) Pedrinho	(Russia) Lokomotiv Moscow	End of loan	
19 May 2023	MF	–	(Italy) André Anderson	(Italy) Lazio	End of loan	
2 June 2023	DF	–	(Brazil) Pedro Lucas	(Greece) Makedonikos	End of contract	
20 June 2023	DF	–	(Brazil) Gabriel Rodrigues	Unattached	End of contract	
30 June 2023	DF	–	(Brazil) Bruno Alves	(Brazil) Grêmio	End of contract	
13 July 2023	FW	–	(Brazil) Newerton	(Ukraine) Shakhtar	R$19,4M	
2 August 2023	DF	–	(Brazil) João Douglas	(Brazil) Red Bull Bragantino	End of contract	
1 September 2023	MF	–	(Brazil) Vinícius	(Italy) Crotone	Free transfer	
1 November 2023	MF	–	(Brazil) Bruno Tatavitto	Unattached	End of contract	

=== Loans out ===
Entry date	Position	No.	Player	To club	Fee	Ref.
13 December 2022	GK	–	(Brazil) Thiago Couto	(Brazil) Juventude	None	
19 December 2022	MF	–	(Brazil) Nikão	(Brazil) Cruzeiro	R$1,2M	
17 January 2023	DF	–	(Brazil) Walce	(Brazil) Juventude	None	
31 January 2023	DF	–	(Brazil) Pedro Lucas	(Brazil) Paranoá	None	
4 February 2023	MF	–	(Brazil) Liziero	(Brazil) Coritiba	None	
5 April 2023	MF	–	(Brazil) Léo Silva	(Brazil) CRB	None	
6 April 2023	FW	–	(Brazil) Gabriel Stevanato	(Brazil) Ituano	None	
17 April 2023	MF	–	(Brazil) Bruno Tatavitto	(Brazil) Inter de Limeira	None	
20 June 2023	DF	–	(Colombia) Luis Manuel Orejuela	(Brazil) Ceará	None	
1 August 2023	DF	–	(Colombia) Luis Manuel Orejuela	(Colombia) Independiente Medellin	None	
29 August 2023	MF	–	(Brazil) Liziero	(Switzerland) Yverdon-Sport	None	

== Competitions ==
=== Overview ===
Competition	First match	Last match	Starting round	Final position	Record							
Competition	First match	Last match	Starting round	Final position	Pld	W	D	L	GF	GA	GD	Win %
Série A	15 April 2023	6 December 2023	Matchday 1	11th	38	14	11	13	40	38	+2	36.84
Campeonato Paulista	15 January 2023	13 March 2023	First stage	Quarter-final	13	7	3	3	23	10	+13	53.85
Copa do Brasil	11 April 2023	24 September 2023	Third round	Winners	10	6	2	2	12	7	+5	60.00
Copa Sudamericana	6 April 2023	31 August 2023	Group stage	Quarter-finals	10	7	1	2	17	3	+14	70.00
Total					71	34	17	20	92	58	+34	47.89

Source: Competitions

=== Campeonato Paulista ===
Pos	Team	Pld	W	D	L	GF	GA	GD	Pts	Qualification or relegation
1	São Paulo	12	7	2	3	23	10	+13	23	Knockout stage
2	Água Santa	12	7	2	3	13	9	+4	23	Knockout stage
3	Mirassol	12	4	3	5	14	14	0	15	
4	Guarani	12	4	2	6	14	14	0	14	

Source: Soccerway

==== Matches ====
15 January 2023 1	São Paulo	0–0	Ituano	São Paulo
18:30 (UTC−3)	Pedrinho (yellow card) 39'	Report	Frazan (yellow card) 78'; Carlão (yellow card) 85'	Stadium: Morumbi; Attendance: 45,115; Referee: Vinícius Gonçalves Dias Araújo

19 January 2023 2	Ferroviária	1–2	São Paulo	Araraquara
19:30 (UTC−3)	Heitor 4'; Alisson Cassiano (yellow card) 6'; Ronaldo Alves (yellow card) 18'; Pablo (yellow card) 84'	Report	Pablo Maia (yellow card) 34' (yellow-red card) 64'; David 50'; Galoppo 88'	Stadium: Fonte Luminosa; Attendance: 11,362; Referee: Flávio Rodrigues de Souza

22 January 2023 3	Palmeiras	0–0	São Paulo	São Paulo
16:00 (UTC−3)	Dudu (yellow card) 81'; Breno Lopes (yellow card) 90+6'	Report	Rafael (yellow card) 32'	Stadium: Allianz Parque; Attendance: 40,196; Referee: Edina Alves Batista

26 January 2023 4	São Paulo	4–1	Portuguesa	São Paulo
21:30 (UTC−3)	Luciano 37', (yellow card) 47'; Pablo Maia (yellow card) 44'; Galoppo 58', 76' (pen.); Marcos Paulo (yellow card) 85'; Pedrinho 89'	Report	Pará (yellow card) 40'; Madison (yellow card) 50'; Tauã (yellow card) 54'; Lucas Nathan 87'	Stadium: Morumbi; Attendance: 31,705; Referee: Salim Fende Chavez

29 January 2023 5	São Paulo	1–2	Corinthians	São Paulo
18:30 (UTC−3)	Luciano 78', (yellow card) 89'; Welington (yellow card) 89'	Report	Adson 18', 34'; Roni (yellow card) 29'; Carlos Miguel (yellow card) 45+6'; Cássio (yellow card) 87'; Romero (yellow card) 90+6'	Stadium: Morumbi; Attendance: 54,970; Referee: Raphael Claus

5 February 2023 6	Santo André	0–1	São Paulo	Santo André
16:00 (UTC−3)	Dudu Vieira (yellow card) 32'; Moisés Ribeiro (yellow card) 56'	Report	David (yellow card) 63'; Alan Franco 90+2'	Stadium: Estádio Bruno José Daniel; Attendance: 10,429; Referee: Douglas Marques das Flores

8 February 2023 7	Red Bull Bragantino	2–1	São Paulo	Bragança Paulista
19:30 (UTC−3)	Alerrandro (yellow card) 45+3'; Juninho Capixaba (yellow card) 69'; Sorriso (yellow card) 75'; Praxedes 85'; Thiago Borbas 88'; Matheus Fernandes (yellow card) 90+1'	Report	Galoppo 65'; Wellington Rato (yellow card) 68'	Stadium: Estádio Nabi Abi Chedid; Attendance: 8,012; Referee: Luiz Flávio de Oliveira

12 February 2023 8	São Paulo	3–1	Santos	São Paulo
18:30 (UTC−3)	Luciano (yellow card) 10'; Calleri 16', (yellow card) 72'; Galoppo 24' (pen.); Belém (yellow card) 47'; Pablo Maia (yellow card) 50'; Luan 87'; Caio Paulista (yellow card) 90+2'	Report	Camacho (yellow card) 14'; Lucas Pires (red card) 20'; Nathan Santos (yellow card) 45+1'; João Lucas (red card) 55'; Rwan Seco 90+4' (pen.)	Stadium: Morumbi; Attendance: 42,311; Referee: Flávio Rodrigues de Souza

15 February 2023 9	São Paulo	5–1	Internacional de Limeira	São Paulo
21:35 (UTC−3)	Caio Paulista 15'; Wellington Rato 43'; Galoppo 49'; Pedrinho 74', (yellow card) 74'; Pablo Maia 88'	Report	João Paulo 27'; Douglas (yellow card) 67'	Stadium: Morumbi; Attendance: 16,422; Referee: Matheus Candançan

21 February 2023 10	São Bento	0–3	São Paulo	Sorocaba
19:30 (UTC−3)	Vitinho (yellow card) 19'; Bruno Aguiar (yellow card) 81'	Report	Galoppo 45+2'; Pedrinho 83'; Calleri 90+4'; Pablo Maia (yellow card) 90+8'	Stadium: Estádio Walter Ribeiro; Attendance: 10,446; Referee: Vinícius Gonçalves Dias Araújo

25 February 2023 11	São Paulo	0–1	São Bernardo	São Paulo
18:30 (UTC−3)	Rodrigo Nestor (yellow card) 44'	Report	Rodrigo Souza 4'; Hugo Sanches (yellow card) 58'; João Carlos (yellow card) 60'; Rafael Vaz (yellow card) 60'; Jhony (yellow card) 90+3'	Stadium: Morumbi; Attendance: 52,602; Referee: Matheus Candançan

5 March 2023 12	Botafogo	1–3	São Paulo	Ribeirão Preto
16:00 (UTC−3)	Robinho 3'; Matheus Albino (yellow card) 58'; Tárik (yellow card) 74'	Report	Luan 60'; Rodrigo Nestor (yellow card) 70'; Galoppo 76', (yellow card) 76'; Juan 81'	Stadium: Estádio Santa Cruz; Attendance: 20,557; Referee: Edina Alves Batista

==== Quarter-final ====
13 March 2023 Single match	São Paulo	0–0 (5–6 p)	Água Santa	São Paulo
20:00 (UTC−3)	Luciano (yellow card) 21'	Report	Bruno Mezenga (yellow card) 40'; Rodrigo Sam (yellow card) 78'; Patrick Allan (yellow card) 90+4'	Stadium: Allianz Parque; Attendance: 39,454; Referee: Vinícius Gonçalves Dias Araújo
	Penalties
	Luciano (penalty scored); Alisson (penalty missed); Alan Franco (penalty scored); Pablo Maia (penalty scored); Caio Paulista (penalty scored); Rodrigo Nestor (penalty scored); Jhegson Méndez (penalty missed)		(penalty scored) Bruno Mezenga; (penalty scored) Reginaldo; (penalty scored) Patrick Allan; (penalty scored) Patrick Brey; (penalty missed) Gabriel Inocêncio; (penalty scored) Kadi; (penalty scored) Thiaguinho

=== Copa Sudamericana ===
The draw for the group stage was held on 27 March 2023, 20:00 PYST (UTC−4), at the CONMEBOL Convention Centre in Luque, Paraguay.

Pos	Team	Pld	W	D	L	GF	GA	GD	Pts	Qualification	SPA	TIG	TOL	APC
1	(Brazil) São Paulo	6	5	1	0	13	0	+13	16	Advance to round of 16	—	2–0	5–0	2–0
2	(Argentina) Tigre	6	3	1	2	7	6	+1	10	Advance to knockout round play-offs	0–2	—	0–0	2–1
3	(Colombia) Deportes Tolima	6	2	2	2	6	8	−2	8		0–0	1–2	—	3–1
4	(Venezuela) Academia Puerto Cabello	6	0	0	6	2	14	−12	0		0–2	0–3	0–2	—

Source: CONMEBOL
Rules for classification: 1) Points; 2) Goal difference; 3) Goals scored; 4) Away goals scored; 5) CONMEBOL ranking.

6 April 2023 1	Tigre (Argentina)	0–2	(Brazil) São Paulo	Victoria, Argentina
21:00 UTC−3	Castro (yellow card) 14'; Luciatti (yellow card) 20'; Molinas (yellow card) 82'	Report	Wellington Rato (yellow card) 8'; Rodrigo Nestor (yellow card) 24'; Erison 57', 74'; Rafinha (yellow card) 73'; Beraldo (yellow card) 88'	Stadium: Estadio José Dellagiovanna; Referee: Esteban Ostojich (Uruguay)

18 April 2023 2	São Paulo (Brazil)	2–0	(Venezuela) Academia Puerto Cabello	São Paulo, Brazil
21:30 UTC−3	Rodrigo Nestor (yellow card) 82'; Marcos Paulo 86'; Michel Araújo 88'	Report		Stadium: Morumbi; Attendance: 16,827; Referee: Ivo Méndez (Bolivia)

2 May 2023 3	Tolima (Colombia)	0–0	(Brazil) São Paulo	Ibagué, Colombia
19:00 UTC−3	Mosquera (yellow card) 18'; Rios (yellow card) 42'; Hernández (yellow card) 45+1'; Guzmán (yellow card) 67'	Report	Caio Paulista (yellow card) 38'; Alisson (yellow card) 40'	Stadium: Estadio Manuel Murillo Toro; Referee: Felipe González (Chile)

23 May 2023 4	Academia Puerto Cabello (Venezuela)	0–2	(Brazil) São Paulo	Valencia, Venezuela
21:30 UTC−3	Danny Pérez (yellow card) 74'	Report	Wellington Rato 28'; Alan Franco (yellow card) 45'; Marcos Paulo (yellow card) 48'; Pablo Maia (yellow card) 68'; Raí Ramos (yellow card) 79'; Alisson 90+4'	Stadium: Estadio Misael Delgado; Attendance: 2,254; Referee: Bryan Loaiza (Ecuador)

8 June 2023 5	São Paulo (Brazil)	5–0	(Colombia) Tolima	São Paulo, Brazil
19:00 UTC−3	Calleri 28'; Luciano 35'; Caio Paulista 37', 61'; Rafinha (yellow card) 45'; David 77', (yellow card) 78'; Rodrigo Nestor (yellow card) 87'	Report	Riascos (yellow card) 12' (yellow-red card) 28'; Cuenú (yellow card) 16'; Mera (yellow card) 48'; Ríos (yellow card) 58'; Lucumí (yellow card) 83'	Stadium: Morumbi; Attendance: 44,102; Referee: Leodán González (Uruguay)

27 June 2023 6	São Paulo (Brazil)	2–0	(Argentina) Tigre	São Paulo, Brazil
21:30 UTC−3	Juan 72'; Wellington Rato 90+3'	Report	Leizza (red card) 23'; Retegui (yellow card) 62'	Stadium: Morumbi; Attendance: 28,699; Referee: Guillermo Guerrero (Ecuador)

==== Round of 16 ====
The draw for the round of 16 was held on 5 July, 12:00 PYST (UTC−4), at the CONMEBOL Convention Centre in Luque, Paraguay.

3 August 2023 First leg	San Lorenzo (Argentina)	1–0	(Brazil) São Paulo	Buenos Aires, Argentina
19:00 UTC−3	Bareiro 51'	Report	Rodrigo Nestor (yellow card) 23'; Arboleda (yellow card) 33'; Michel Araújo (yellow card) 75'; David (yellow card) 90+3'	Stadium: Estadio Pedro Bidegain; Attendance: 12,736; Referee: Wilmar Roldán (Colombia)

10 August 2023 Second leg	São Paulo (Brazil)	2–0 (2–1 agg.)	(Argentina) San Lorenzo	São Paulo, Brazil
19:00 UTC−3	Gabriel Neves (yellow card) 29'; Luciano (yellow card) 36' (goal) 67'; Calleri 45'; Pablo Maia (yellow card) 45+4'; Alisson (yellow card) 74'; Rodrigo Nestor (yellow card) 79'	Report	Bareiro (yellow card) 36'; Rafa Pérez (yellow card) 59'; Giay (yellow card) 66'; G. Hernández (yellow card) 87'	Stadium: Morumbi; Attendance: 51,816; Referee: Esteban Ostojich (Uruguay)

==== Quarter-finals ====
24 August 2023 First leg	LDU (Ecuador)	2–1	(Brazil) São Paulo	Quito, Ecuador
19:00 UTC−3	Jhojan Julio 2'; Ibarra 25'; González (yellow card) 85'	Report	Rafinha (yellow card) 12'; Beraldo (yellow card) 45+1'; Lucas Moura 80'; Luan (yellow card) 87'	Stadium: Estadio Rodrigo Paz Delgado; Attendance: 30,648; Referee: Jhon Ospina (Colombia)

31 August 2023 Second leg	São Paulo (Brazil)	1–0 (2–2 agg.) (4–5 p)	(Ecuador) LDU	São Paulo, Brazil
19:00 UTC−3	Arboleda 77'; Michel Araújo (yellow card) 90'	Report	Quiñónez (yellow card) 24'; Alvarado (red card) 48'; Ibarra (yellow card) 81'; Adé (yellow card) 90+1'	Stadium: Morumbi; Attendance: 52,658; Referee: Alexis Herrera (Venezuela)
	Penalties
	Calleri (penalty scored); James Rodríguez (penalty missed); Lucas Moura (penalty scored); Beraldo (penalty scored); Wellington Rato (penalty scored)		Guerrero (penalty scored) , (yellow card); Alzugaray (penalty scored); Martínez (penalty scored); Quiñónez (penalty scored); Jhojan Julio (penalty scored)

=== Série A ===
==== League table ====
Pos	Team	Pld	W	D	L	GF	GA	GD	Pts	Qualification or relegation
9	Internacional	38	15	10	13	46	45	+1	55	Qualification for Copa Sudamericana group stage
10	Fortaleza	38	15	9	14	45	44	+1	54	Qualification for Copa Sudamericana group stage
11	São Paulo	38	14	11	13	40	38	+2	53	Qualification for Copa Libertadores group stage (Note: São Paulo qualified for the Copa Libertadores group stage by winning the 2023 Copa do Brasil.)
12	Cuiabá	38	14	9	15	40	39	+1	51	Qualification for Copa Sudamericana group stage
13	Corinthians	38	12	14	12	47	48	−1	50	Qualification for Copa Sudamericana group stage

Source: CBF
Rules for classification: 1) points; 2) wins; 3) goal difference; 4) goals scored; 5) head-to-head results (only between two teams); 6) fewest red cards; 7) fewest yellow cards; 8) drawing of lots.

==== Results summary ====
Overall								Home						Away					
Pld	W	D	L	GF	GA	GD	Pts	W	D	L	GF	GA	GD	W	D	L	GF	GA	GD
38	14	11	13	40	38	+2	53	13	3	3	29	13	+16	1	8	10	11	25	−14

==== Results by round ====
Round	1	2	3	4	5	6	7	8	9	10	11	12	13	14	15	16	17	18	19	20	21	22	23	24	25	26	27	28	29	30	31	32	33	34	35	36	37	38
Ground	A	H	A	H	A	A	H	H	A	H	H	A	H	A	H	A	H	H	A	H	A	H	A	H	H	A	A	H	A	A	H	A	H	A	H	A	A	H
Result	L	W	D	W	D	D	W	W	L	L	W	L	W	D	W	L	D	L	D	D	L	W	L	L	W	D	L	W	L	D	W	L	W	D	D	W	L	W
Position	14	9	8	5	7	10	8	3	8	8	6	11	7	8	4	6	8	9	9	10	11	10	13	14	10	10	11	10	10	11	10	10	9	10	10	9	11	11

Postponed

Source: CBF.com

==== Matches ====
The league fixtures were announced on 14 February 2023.

15 April 2023 1	Botafogo	2–1	São Paulo	Rio de Janeiro
18:30 UTC−3	Tiquinho Soares 4'; Di Plácido (yellow card) 45'; Carlos Eduardo (yellow card) 80', (goal) 88'; Cuesta (yellow card) 85'	Report	Jhegson Méndez (yellow card) 8'; Calleri 15', (yellow card) 48'	Stadium: Estádio Nilton Santos; Attendance: 11,708; Referee: Ramon Abatti Abel

22 April 2023 2	São Paulo	3–0	América Mineiro	São Paulo
18:30 UTC−3	Pablo Maia (yellow card) 16'; Luciano 21', (yellow card) 72'; Patryck (yellow card) 30'; Raí Ramos (yellow card) 45+5'; Calleri 82'; Marcos Paulo 90+5', (yellow card) 90+6'	Report	Lucas Kal (yellow card) 33'; Everaldo (yellow card) 45+3'; Éder (yellow card) 80'	Stadium: Morumbi; Attendance: 41,006; Referee: Wagner do Nascimento Magalhães

29 April 2023 3	Coritiba	1–1	São Paulo	Curitiba
16:30 UTC−3	Bruno Gomes 12', (yellow card) 38'; Kuscevic (yellow card) 34'; Gabriel (yellow card) 60'; Kaio César (yellow card) 70'	Report	Michel Araújo (yellow card) 78'; Marcos Paulo 81'	Stadium: Estádio Couto Pereira; Attendance: 25,210; Referee: Rafael Rodrigo Klein

7 May 2023 4	São Paulo	2–0	Internacional	São Paulo
16:00 UTC−3	Luciano (penalty missed) 33', 33'; Rafinha (yellow card) 45+2'; Gabriel Neves (yellow card) 58'; Pablo Maia 70'; Wellington Rato (yellow card) 82'	Report	Maurício (yellow card) 58'; Mercado (yellow card) 67'; Moledo (yellow card) 79'; Lucca (yellow card) 87'	Stadium: Morumbi; Attendance: 46,093; Referee: Bráulio da Silva Machado

11 May 2023 5	Fortaleza	0–0	São Paulo	Fortaleza
20:00 UTC−3	Brítez (yellow card) 21' (yellow-red card) 62'; Yago Pikachu (yellow card) 45+6'	Report	Raí Ramos (yellow card) 29'; Rodrigo Nestor (yellow card) 45+3' (yellow-red card) 71'; Gabriel Neves (yellow card) 80'; Alisson (yellow card) 90+1'	Stadium: Arena Castelão; Attendance: 37,775; Referee: Paulo César Zanovelli da Silva

14 May 2023 6	Corinthians	1–1	São Paulo	São Paulo
16:00 UTC−3	Fagner (yellow card) 5'; Gil (yellow card) 27'; Róger Guedes 45+6' (pen.)	Report	Beraldo (yellow card) 11'; Michel Araújo 15'; Caio Paulista (yellow card) 29'; Rafinha (yellow card) 45+4'; Luciano (yellow card) 45+7'	Stadium: Neo Química Arena; Attendance: 41,434; Referee: Bruno Arleu de Araújo

20 May 2023 7	São Paulo	4–2	Vasco	São Paulo
18:30 UTC−3	Calleri 24'; Rodrigo Nestor 42'; Beraldo 89'; Juan Santos 90+2'	Report	Cauan Barros (yellow card) 35', (goal) 45'; Figueiredo (yellow card) 49'; Jair (yellow card) 75'; Galarza 83'; Pedro Raul (yellow card) 83'	Stadium: Morumbi; Attendance: 57,399; Referee: Leandro Vuaden

27 May 2023 8	São Paulo	2–1	Goiás	São Paulo
21:00 UTC−3	Wellington Rato (yellow card) 45+5'; Pablo Maia 57'; Alan Franco (yellow card) 78'; David 90+1'	Report	Diego (yellow card) 20'; Maguinho 29'; Lucas Halter (yellow card) 45+4'; Bruno Santos (yellow card) 90+4'; Fellipe Bastos (yellow card) 90+7'	Stadium: Morumbi; Attendance: 45,429; Referee: Rafael Rodrigo Klein

4 June 2023 9	Grêmio	2–1	São Paulo	Porto Alegre
16:00 UTC−3	Cristaldo 31' (pen.); Reinaldo 39', (yellow card) 82'; Mila (yellow card) 88'	Report	Calleri 15'; Alan Franco (yellow card) 29'	Stadium: Arena do Grêmio; Attendance: 42,207; Referee: Wilton Pereira Sampaio

11 June 2023 10	São Paulo	0–2	Palmeiras	São Paulo
16:00 UTC−3	David (yellow card) 89'; Rodriguinho (yellow card) 90'; Pablo Maia (yellow card) 90+3' (yellow-red card) 90+4'	Report	Gabriel Menino 11'; Endrick 78'; Artur (yellow card) 89'	Stadium: Morumbi; Attendance: 56,871; Referee: Raphael Claus

21 June 2023 11	São Paulo	2–1	Athletico Paranaense	São Paulo
19:00 UTC−3	Gabriel Neves 19', (yellow card) 85'; Luciano 47'; Calleri (yellow card) 59'; Caio Paulista (yellow card) 90+2'	Report	Vitor Roque 11'; Alex Santana (yellow card) 44'; Thiago Heleno (yellow card) 57'	Stadium: Morumbi; Attendance: 22,882; Referee: Sávio Pereira Sampaio

24 June 2023 12	Cruzeiro	1–0	São Paulo	Belo Horizonte
21:00 UTC−3	Rafinha 3' (o.g.); Henrique Dourado (yellow card) 90+3'	Report	Rodrigo Nestor (yellow card) 74'; Rodriguinho (yellow card) 81'; David (yellow card) 88'	Stadium: Independência; Attendance: 17,478; Referee: Ramon Abatti Abel

1 July 2023 13	São Paulo	1–0	Fluminense	São Paulo
16:00 UTC−3	Gabriel Neves (yellow card) 55'; Luciano 87'; Patryck (yellow card) 90+8'	Report	Felipe Melo (yellow card) 11'; Jhon Arias (yellow card) 86', (red card) 90+9'	Stadium: Morumbi; Attendance: 49,153; Referee: Anderson Daronco

9 July 2023 14	Red Bull Bragantino	0–0	São Paulo	Bragança Paulista
16:00 UTC−3	Vitinho (yellow card) 31'; Juninho Capixaba (yellow card) 90+4'	Report	Marcos Paulo (yellow card) 39'; Nathan (yellow card) 66'	Stadium: Estádio Nabi Abi Chedid; Attendance: 9,411; Referee: Raphael Claus

16 July 2023 15	São Paulo	4–1	Santos	São Paulo
16:00 UTC−3	Calleri 22' (pen.), 45+1'; Alisson (yellow card) 50'; David 79', (yellow card) 90'; Alexandre Pato 88'; Michel Araújo (yellow card) 90+2'	Report	Messias (yellow card) 13'; Mendoza (yellow card) 24'; Sandry (yellow card) 35'; Joaquim (yellow card) 70'; Kevyson (yellow card) 86'; Marcos Leonardo 90+3' (pen.)	Stadium: Morumbi; Attendance: 58,127; Referee: Bráulio da Silva Machado

22 July 2023 16	Cuiabá	2–1	São Paulo	Cuiabá
18:30 UTC−3	Jonathan Cafú (yellow card) 47'; Deyverson (penalty missed) 58'; Clayson 66' (pen.); Marllon (yellow card) 75'; Isidro Pitta 78'	Report	Diego Costa (yellow card) 30'; Calleri (yellow card) 48'; Luciano (yellow card) 60'; Erison (yellow card) 86'; Pablo Maia (yellow card) 90+7'; Nathan 90+9'	Stadium: Arena Pantanal; Attendance: 34,072; Referee: Bruno Mota Correia

30 July 2023 17	São Paulo	0–0	Bahia	São Paulo
11:00 UTC−3		Report	Matheus Bahia (yellow card) 18'; Gilberto (yellow card) 25'; Gabriel Xavier (yellow card) 31'; Rafael Ratão (yellow card) 76'	Stadium: Morumbi; Attendance: 56,078; Referee: Ramon Abatti Abel

6 August 2023 18	São Paulo	0–2	Atlético Mineiro	São Paulo
16:00 UTC−3	Rafinha (yellow card) 8'; Rodrigo Nestor (yellow card) 45+2'; Diego Costa (yellow card) 62'; David (yellow card) 72'; Pablo Maia (yellow card) 80'; Beraldo (yellow card) 90+5'	Report	Jemerson (yellow card) 1'; Hulk 4'; Battaglia (yellow card) 60'; Saravia (yellow card) 62'; Pavón 69' (pen.), (yellow card) 70'; Matheus Mendes (yellow card) 90+1'	Stadium: Morumbi; Attendance: 53,460; Referee: Rodrigo José Pereira de Lima

13 August 2023 19	Flamengo	1–1	São Paulo	Rio de Janeiro
18:30 UTC−3	Wesley França (yellow card) 24'; Pedro 90+6' (pen.); Gerson (yellow card) 90+9'	Report	Juan (yellow card) 29'; Lucas Moura 38'; Welington (yellow card) 77'; Jandrei (yellow card) 82'; Rodrigo Nestor (yellow card) 90+1'; Alan Franco (yellow card) 90+5'; Wellington Rato (yellow card) 90+11'	Stadium: Maracanã; Attendance: 62,018; Referee: Rafael Rodrigo Klein

19 August 2023 20	São Paulo	0–0	Botafogo	São Paulo
16:00 UTC−3	Luciano (yellow card) 50'; Welington (yellow card) 53'; Diego Costa (yellow card) 90+1'; Rafinha (yellow card) 90+3'	Report	Di Plácido (yellow card) 2'; Tchê Tchê (yellow card) 61'	Stadium: Morumbi; Attendance: 51,946; Referee: Ramon Abatti Abel

27 August 2023 21	América Mineiro	2–1	São Paulo	Belo Horizonte
16:00 UTC−3	Emmanuel Martínez (yellow card) 19'; Felipe Azevedo (yellow card) 33'; Mastriani 61', (red card) 73'; Breno (yellow card) 66'; Iago Maidana (yellow card) 79'; Juninho (yellow card) 80'; Rodrigo Varanda 90'	Report	Matheus Belém (yellow card) 36'; Arboleda (red card) 74'; Alexandre Pato (penalty missed) 81', 81'	Stadium: Independência; Attendance: 5,105; Referee: Rodrigo José Pereira de Lima

13 September 2023 23	Internacional	2–1	São Paulo	Porto Alegre
21:30 UTC−3	Mercado (yellow card) 18'; Gabriel (yellow card) 30'; Keille (yellow card) 45+2'; Bustos 59'; Renê 70'; Matheus Dias (yellow card) 90+7'; Lucca (yellow card) 90+8'	Report	Diego Costa (yellow card) 16'; Pablo Maia (yellow card) 41'; Calleri 45+4' (pen.), (yellow card) 90+4'; Rafinha (yellow card) 75'	Stadium: Estádio Beira-Rio; Attendance: 20,763; Referee: Paulo César Zanovelli da Silva

20 September 2023 24	São Paulo	1–2	Fortaleza	São Paulo
21:30 UTC−3	James Rodríguez (penalty missed) 21', 79'; Diego Costa (yellow card) 53'; Nathan (yellow card) 67'; Rodriguinho (yellow card) 88'	Report	Zé Welison 16', (yellow card) 27'; Titi (yellow card) 18'; Lucero 53' (pen.); João Ricardo (yellow card) 60'; Marinho (yellow card) 69'; Thiago Galhardo (yellow card) 90+3'; Pedro Augusto (yellow card) 90+8'	Stadium: Morumbi; Attendance: 24,777; Referee: Yuri Elino Ferreira da Cruz

27 September 2023 22	São Paulo	2–1	Coritiba	São Paulo
19:00 UTC−3	Alan Franco 30'; Luciano 45+13' (pen.); Luan (yellow card) 58'; Calleri (yellow card) 83'	Report	Robson (yellow card) 6'; Slimani 45+1'; Victor Luis (yellow card) 70'; Henrique (yellow card) 83'	Stadium: Morumbi; Attendance: 31,720; Referee: Sávio Pereira Sampaio

30 September 2023 25	São Paulo	2–1	Corinthians	São Paulo
18:30 UTC−3	Wellington Rato (yellow card) 24'; Calleri 40', 45+2', (yellow card) 45+4'; Beraldo (yellow card) 52'; Rafinha (yellow card) 55'; Gabriel Neves (yellow card) 90+5'	Report	Romero 3', (yellow card) 33'; Gustavo Silva (yellow card) 38'	Stadium: Morumbi; Attendance: 56,735; Referee: Flávio Rodrigues de Souza

7 October 2023 26	Vasco	0–0	São Paulo	Rio de Janeiro
18:30 UTC−3	Paulinho (yellow card) 37'; Léo (yellow card) 45'; Maicon (yellow card) 73'	Report	Wellington Rato (penalty missed) 45+1'; Nathan (yellow card) 45+2'	Stadium: Estádio São Januário; Attendance: 20,690; Referee: Bráulio da Silva Machado

18 October 2023 27	Goiás	2–0	São Paulo	Goiânia
20:00 UTC−3	Hugo 10'; Willian Oliveira (yellow card) 15'; Allano (yellow card) 26'; Morelli 45+5'; Sidimar (yellow card) 74'; Matheus Babi (yellow card) 90+6'	Report	Rafinha (yellow card) 24'; Caio Paulista (yellow card) 26'; Pablo Maia (yellow card) 36'	Stadium: Estádio da Serrinha; Attendance: 12,685; Referee: Rodrigo José Pereira de Lima

21 October 2023 28	São Paulo	3–0	Grêmio	São Paulo
18:30 UTC−3	Michel Araújo 21'; Pablo Maia (yellow card) 43', (goal) 68'; Luciano 90+7'	Report	Kannemann (yellow card) 21'; Josué (yellow card) 69'; Suárez (yellow card) 89'	Stadium: Morumbi; Attendance: 47,132; Referee: André Luiz Skettino Policarpo Bento

25 October 2023 29	Palmeiras	5–0	São Paulo	São Paulo
20:00 UTC−3	Breno Lopes 16', 26'; Zé Rafael (yellow card) 21'; Endrick (yellow card) 44'; Piquerez 45+7' (pen.), 87'; Raphael Veiga (yellow card) 45+10'; Marcos Rocha 84'	Report	Beraldo (yellow card) 25'; Rafinha (yellow card) 45+2' (yellow-red card) 61'; Wellington Rato (yellow card) 79'	Stadium: Allianz Parque; Attendance: 32,618; Referee: Raphael Claus

29 October 2023 30	Athletico Paranaense	1–1	São Paulo	Curitiba
16:00 UTC−3	Pablo 7'; Hugo Moura (yellow card) 57'	Report	Pablo Maia 10', (yellow card) 17'; Erison (yellow card) 24'; Nathan (yellow card) 55'; Luciano (yellow card) 68'; Rafael (yellow card) 90+3'	Stadium: Ligga Arena; Attendance: 27,604; Referee: Rafael Rodrigo Klein

2 November 2023 31	São Paulo	1–0	Cruzeiro	São Paulo
20:00 UTC−3	Beraldo (yellow card) 72'; Luciano 84'	Report	William (yellow card) 49'; Anderson (yellow card) 56', (red card) 56'; Rafael Elias (yellow card) 74'	Stadium: Morumbi; Attendance: 50,570; Referee: Wilton Pereira Sampaio

8 November 2023 33	São Paulo	1–0	Red Bull Bragantino	Santos
20:00 UTC−3	Juan (yellow card) 34'; Gabriel Neves (yellow card) 77'; Erison 90+3' (pen.)	Report	Helinho (yellow card) 40'; Lucas Evangelista (yellow card) 65'	Stadium: Vila Belmiro; Attendance: 11,948; Referee: Flávio Rodrigues de Souza

12 November 2023 34	Santos	0–0	São Paulo	Santos
18:30 UTC−3		Report	Wellington Rato (yellow card) 42'; Rafinha (yellow card) 61'	Stadium: Vila Belmiro; Attendance: 13,442; Referee: Raphael Claus

22 November 2023 32	Fluminense	1–0	São Paulo	Rio de Janeiro
21:30 UTC−3	Guga (yellow card) 13'; Marcelo (yellow card) 17'; Ganso (yellow card) 20'; Cano (yellow card) 28', (goal) 54'; Matheus Martinelli (yellow card) 47'; Alexsander (yellow card) 90+7'	Report	Beraldo (yellow card) 9'; Diego Costa (yellow card) 20'; Rafinha (yellow card) 28'; Gabriel Neves (red card) 29'; David (yellow card) 60'; Nathan (yellow card) 90+6'	Stadium: Maracanã; Attendance: 44,694; Referee: André Luiz Skettino Policarpo Bento

26 November 2023 35	São Paulo	0–0	Cuiabá	São Paulo
18:30 UTC−3	Arboleda (yellow card) 71'; Erison (yellow card) 90+4'	Report		Stadium: Morumbi; Attendance: 34,252; Referee: Paulo César Zanovelli da Silva

29 November 2023 36	Bahia	0–1	São Paulo	Salvador
19:00 UTC−3	Yago Felipe (yellow card) 54'; Kanu (yellow card) 87'; Rafael Ratão (yellow card) 90+1'; Lucas Mugni (yellow card) 90+2'	Report	Beraldo (yellow card) 81'; Talles Costa (yellow card) 90+1'; Caio Paulista 90+7', (yellow card) 90+8'	Stadium: Arena Fonte Nova; Attendance: 46,288; Referee: Bráulio da Silva Machado

2 December 2023 37	Atlético Mineiro	2–1	São Paulo	Belo Horizonte
21:00 UTC−3	Arana (yellow card) 65'; Hulk 77', (yellow card) 78'; Matheus Mendes (yellow card) 89'; Paulinho 90+4', (yellow card) 90+5'	Report	Michel Araújo (yellow card) 46'; Luciano 90+1' (pen.)	Stadium: Mineirão; Attendance: 53,856; Referee: Sávio Pereira Sampaio

6 December 2023 38	São Paulo	1–0	Flamengo	São Paulo
21:30 UTC−3	Luciano 26'	Report	Pablo (yellow card) 15'; Victor Hugo (yellow card) 65'; Allan (yellow card) 79'	Stadium: Morumbi; Attendance: 36,618; Referee: Caio Max Augusto Vieira

=== Copa do Brasil ===
==== Third round ====
11 April 2023 First leg	São Paulo	0–0	Ituano	São Paulo
21:30 UTC−3	Nathan (yellow card) 5'; Calleri (yellow card) 40'; Wellington Rato (yellow card) 45+3'	Report		Stadium: Morumbi; Attendance: 28,724; Referee: Caio Max Augusto Vieira

25 April 2023 Second leg	Ituano	0–1 (0–1 agg.)	São Paulo	Itu
21:30 UTC−3	Eduardo Person (yellow card) 34'	Report	Rodrigo Nestor (yellow card) 34'; Arboleda (yellow card) 54'; Wellington Rato 63'; Luciano (yellow card) 75'; Michel Araújo (yellow card) 90'; Luan (yellow card) 90+6'	Stadium: Novelli Júnior; Attendance: 9,829; Referee: Anderson Daronco

==== Round of 16 ====
17 May 2023 First leg	Sport	0–2	São Paulo	Recife
20:00 UTC−3	Jorginho (yellow card) 34'; Fabinho (yellow card) 55' (yellow-red card) 61'; Ronaldo Henrique (yellow card) 80'	Report	Beraldo (yellow card) 34'; Rodrigo Nestor (yellow card) 55'; Rafinha (yellow card) 60'; Luciano 71'; Marcos Paulo 89'	Stadium: Ilha do Retiro; Attendance: 22,889; Referee: Wilton Pereira Sampaio

1 June 2023 Second leg	São Paulo	1–3 (3–3 agg.) (5–3 p)	Sport	São Paulo
19:30 UTC−3	Michel Araújo 26'	Report	Alisson Cassiano 44'; Sabino 52', 90+4'; Rafael Thyere (yellow card) 56'; Gabriel Santos (yellow card) 90+2'; Jordan (yellow card) 90+3'	Stadium: Morumbi; Attendance: 49,752; Referee: Wagner do Nascimento Magalhães
	Penalties
	Wellington Rato (penalty scored); Lucas Beraldo (penalty scored); Calleri (penalty scored); Rafinha (penalty scored); Pablo Maia (penalty scored)		(penalty scored) Sabino; (penalty missed) Luciano Juba; (penalty scored) Alisson Cassiano; (penalty scored) Rafael Thyere

==== Quarter-finals ====
5 July 2023 First leg	São Paulo	1–0	Palmeiras	São Paulo
19:30 UTC−3	Gabriel Neves (yellow card) 44'; Pablo Maia (yellow card) 44'; Rafinha 82'; David (yellow card) 90+3'; Wellington Rato (yellow card) 90+4'	Report	Mayke (yellow card) 87'; Gómez (yellow card) 90+2'	Stadium: Morumbi; Attendance: 54,593; Referee: Bráulio da Silva Machado

13 July 2023 Second leg	Palmeiras	1–2 (1–3 agg.)	São Paulo	São Paulo
20:00 UTC−3	Piquerez 34'; Mayke (yellow card) 42'	Report	Alisson (yellow card) 7'; Luciano (yellow card) 23'; Caio Paulista 49', (yellow card) 85'; Luan (yellow card) 88'; David 89'	Stadium: Allianz Parque; Attendance: 41,451; Referee: Anderson Daronco

==== Semi-finals ====
25 July 2023 First leg	Corinthians	2–1	São Paulo	São Paulo
21:30 UTC−3	Renato Augusto 48', 81'	Report	Pablo Maia (yellow card) 44'; Luciano 55' (yellow card) 57'; Beraldo (yellow card) 88'	Stadium: Neo Química Arena; Attendance: 46,965; Referee: Wilton Pereira Sampaio

16 August 2023 Second leg	São Paulo	2–0 (3–2 agg.)	Corinthians	São Paulo
19:30 UTC−3	Wellington Rato 13'; Lucas Moura 32'	Report	Murillo (yellow card) 68'; Gil (yellow card) 90+9'	Stadium: Morumbi; Attendance: 62,093; Referee: Raphael Claus

==== Finals ====
17 September 2023 First leg	Flamengo	0–1	São Paulo	Rio de Janeiro
16:00 UTC−3	Léo Pereira (yellow card) 14'; Victor Hugo (yellow card) 36'	Report	Alisson (yellow card) 38'; Calleri 45+1'	Stadium: Maracanã; Attendance: 67,350; Referee: Anderson Daronco

24 September 2023 Second leg	São Paulo	1–1 (2–1 agg.)	Flamengo	São Paulo
16:00 UTC−3	Alisson (yellow card) 17'; Pablo Maia (yellow card) 25'; Rafinha (yellow card) 25'; Nestor 45+5'; Gabriel Neves (yellow card) 90+5' (yellow-red card) 90+9'	Report	Léo Pereira (yellow card) 31'; Bruno Henrique 44'; Fabrício Bruno (yellow card) 90+7'	Stadium: Morumbi; Attendance: 63,077; Referee: Bráulio da Silva Machado

== Statistics ==
=== Goals scored ===
Rank	Player	BR	CdB	CP	CS	Total
1	Luciano	9	2	2	2	15
2	Jonathan Calleri	9	1	2	2	14
3	Giuliano Galoppo	0	0	8	0	8
4	Caio Paulista	1	1	1	2	5
4	David	2	1	1	1	5
4	Pablo Maia	4	0	1	0	5
4	Wellington Rato	0	2	1	2	5
8	Marcos Paulo	2	1	0	1	4
8	Michel Araújo	2	1	0	1	4
10	Erison	1	0	0	2	3
10	Juan	1	0	1	1	3
10	Lucas Moura	1	1	0	1	3
10	Pedrinho	0	0	3	0	3
14	Alan Franco	1	0	1	0	2
14	Alexandre Pato	2	0	0	0	2
14	Luan	0	0	2	0	2
14	Rodrigo Nestor	1	1	0	0	2
18	Alisson	0	0	0	1	1
18	Gabriel Neves	1	0	0	0	1
18	James Rodríguez	1	0	0	0	1
18	Lucas Beraldo	1	0	0	0	1
18	Nathan	1	0	0	0	1
18	Rafinha	0	1	0	0	1
18	Robert Arboleda	0	0	0	1	1
Total		40	12	23	17	92
