= Matheus Belém =

Brazilian footballer (born 2003)

Matheus Belem
Personal information
- Full name: Matheus José Belém de Souza
- Date of birth: 13 March 2003 (age 23)
- Place of birth: São Paulo, Brazil
- Height: 1.83 m (6 ft 0 in)
- Position: Centre-back

Youth career
- 2015–2023: São Paulo

Senior career*
Years	Team	Apps	(Gls)
2023–2026	São Paulo	3	(0)
2025	→ Chapecoense (loan)	0	(0)
2026	→ Camboriú (loan)	10	(0)
2026	Qabala	0	(0)
- * Club domestic league appearances and goals as of 10 July 2026

Matheus José Belém de Souza (born 13 March 2003), simply known as Belém, is a Brazilian professional footballer who plays as a centre-back.

== Career ==
Born in São Paulo, Belém joined São Paulo FC's youth setup at the age of 12. He played all 5 Copinha games and scored 1 goal for São Paulo's youth academy. After that, he was promoted to the first team. He made his professional debut with the club on 12 February 2023, coming on as a half-time substitute for Alan Franco in a 3–1 home win against Santos, for the 2023 Campeonato Paulista.

On 9 July 2023 he was voted the best player on the field by Rede Globo in the match against Red Bull Bragantino.

On 6 December 2024, after not being used in São Paulo FC professional season, Belém agreed to loan him to Chapecoense, until the end of 2025. On 15 April he was returned as he had not entered the field once. In December 2025, a new six-month loan agreement was reached with Camboriú FC. On 8 July 2026 a free transfer was agreed upon for Belém to Qabala İK of the Azerbaijan First Division. After playing a single friendly match for Qabala, Belém terminated his contract, citing discrepancies regarding the agreed-upon terms, and returned to Brazil.

== Style of play ==
Belém is known for his speed and physicality.

== Career statistics ==
=== Club ===
As of 6 December 2024

Club	Season	League			State League		Cup		Continental		Other		Total	
Club	Season	Division	Apps	Goals	Apps	Goals	Apps	Goals	Apps	Goals	Apps	Goals	Apps	Goals
São Paulo	2023	Série A	2	0	1	0	0	0	0	0	0	0	3	0
São Paulo	2024	Série A	0	0	0	0	0	0	0	0	0	0	0	0
Career total			2	0	1	0	0	0	0	0	0	0	3	0

== Honours ==
São Paulo

- Copa do Brasil: 2023

São Paulo U17

- Copa do Brasil Sub-17: 2020
- Supercopa do Brasil Sub-17: 2020
- Campeonato Paulista Sub-17: 2019
