= 2024 Supercopa do Brasil =

7th Supercopa do Brasil, annual football match

2024 Supercopa Rei
Palmeiras	São Paulo
(São Paulo (state))	(São Paulo (state))
0	0
- São Paulo won 4–2 on penalties
- Date: 4 February 2024
- Venue: Mineirão, Belo Horizonte
- Man of the Match: Rafael (São Paulo)
- Referee: Bráulio da Silva Machado (Santa Catarina)
- Attendance: 42,741

The 2024 Supercopa Rei was the seventh edition of Supercopa Rei (formerly known as Supercopa do Brasil), an annual football match played between the champions of the Campeonato Brasileiro Série A and Copa do Brasil.

This edition featured Palmeiras, champions of the 2023 Campeonato Brasileiro Série A, and São Paulo, champions of the 2023 Copa do Brasil, the first Choque-Rei in this competition.

On 31 October 2023, the CBF announced that the tournament would take place on 3 February 2024, with the venue still to be determined. Later, on 12 January 2024, it was confirmed that the match would be played on 4 February 2024 at Mineirão in Belo Horizonte. In honor of O Rei Pelé, who died in 2022, the Supercopa do Brasil was renamed the Supercopa Rei on 31 January 2024.

Tied 0–0, São Paulo won 4–2 on penalties to win their first title in the tournament.

== Qualified teams ==
Team	Qualification	Previous appearances (bold indicates winners)
(São Paulo (state)) Palmeiras	2023 Campeonato Brasileiro Série A champions	2 (2021, **2023**)
(São Paulo (state)) São Paulo	2023 Copa do Brasil champions	—

== Match ==
=== Details ===
4 February 2024
16:00 UTC–3

Palmeiras (São Paulo (state))	0–0	(São Paulo (state)) São Paulo
	Report
Penalties
Raphael Veiga (penalty scored); Gabriel Menino (penalty scored); Murilo (penalty missed); Piquerez (penalty missed)	2–4	(penalty scored) Calleri; (penalty scored) Galoppo; (penalty scored) Pablo Maia; (penalty scored) Araújo

Mineirão, Belo Horizonte
Attendance: 42,741
Referee: Bráulio da Silva Machado (Santa Catarina)

**Palmeiras**	**São Paulo**

GK	21	(Brazil) Weverton
DF	2	(Brazil) Marcos Rocha	(yellow card) 89'
DF	15	(Paraguay) Gustavo Gómez (c)
DF	26	(Brazil) Murilo
MF	12	(Brazil) Mayke		(substituted off) 81'
MF	27	(Colombia) Richard Ríos		(substituted off) 81'
MF	8	(Brazil) Zé Rafael	(yellow card) 23'	(substituted off) 87'
MF	22	(Uruguay) Joaquín Piquerez
MF	23	(Brazil) Raphael Veiga	(yellow card) 14'
FW	42	(Argentina) José Manuel López	(yellow card) 32'	(substituted off) 61'
FW	10	(Brazil) Rony
Substitutes:
GK	14	(Brazil) Marcelo Lomba
DF	6	(Brazil) Vanderlan
DF	13	(Brazil) Luan
DF	16	(Brazil) Caio Paulista
DF	32	(Brazil) Gustavo Garcia
DF	34	(Brazil) Kaiky Naves
MF	5	(Argentina) Aníbal Moreno		(substituted in) 81'
MF	25	(Brazil) Gabriel Menino		(substituted in) 81'
MF	31	(Brazil) Luis Guilherme	(yellow card) 90+4'	(substituted in) 87'
MF	35	(Brazil) Fabinho
MF	40	(Brazil) Jhon Jhon		(substituted in) 61'
FW	19	(Brazil) Breno Lopes
Manager:
(Portugal) Abel Ferreira				(yellow card) 32'

GK	23	(Brazil) Rafael
DF	13	(Brazil) Rafinha (c)		(substituted off) 58'
DF	5	(Ecuador) Robert Arboleda
DF	4	(Brazil) Diego Costa
DF	6	(Brazil) Welington	(yellow card) 72'	(substituted off) 69'
MF	29	(Brazil) Pablo Maia	(yellow card) 63'
MF	25	(Brazil) Alisson
MF	27	(Brazil) Wellington Rato		(substituted off) 81'
MF	43	(Brazil) Nikão		(substituted off) 46'
FW	10	(Brazil) Luciano	(yellow card) 2'	(substituted off) 69'
FW	9	(Argentina) Jonathan Calleri
Substitutes:
GK	93	(Brazil) Jandrei
DF	3	(Venezuela) Nahuel Ferraresi
DF	28	(Argentina) Alan Franco
DF	30	(Portugal) João Moreira		(substituted in) 58'
DF	36	(Brazil) Patryck
MF	14	(Argentina) Giuliano Galoppo		(substituted in) 69'
MF	15	(Uruguay) Michel Araújo		(substituted in) 46'
MF	16	(Brazil) Luiz Gustavo
MF	21	(Paraguay) Damián Bobadilla
FW	31	(Brazil) Juan
FW	33	(Brazil) Erick	(yellow card) 90+2'	(substituted in) 69'
FW	47	(Brazil) Ferreira		(substituted in) 81'
Manager:
(Brazil) Thiago Carpini				(yellow card) 83'

Man of the Match:
Rafael (São Paulo)
Assistant referees:
Rodrigo Figueiredo Henrique Corrêa (Rio de Janeiro)
Guilherme Dias Camilo (Minas Gerais)
Fourth official:
Rafael Rodrigo Klein (Rio Grande do Sul)
Fifth official:
Fernanda Kruger (Mato Grosso)
Video assistant referee:
Wagner Reway (Espírito Santo)
Assistant video assistant referees:
Cleriston Clay Barreto Rios (Sergipe)
Daniel Nobre Bins (Rio Grande do Sul)

**Match rules**

- 90 minutes.
- Penalty shoot-out if scores still level.
- Twelve named substitutes.
- Maximum of five substitutions.
