= Alan Franco =

Alan Franco may refer to:

- Alan Franco (footballer, born 1996), Argentine football centre-back
- Alan Franco (footballer, born 1998), Ecuadorian football midfielder
