= 2023 Campeonato Paulista =

Campeonato Paulista - Série A1
- Season: 2023
- Dates: 14 January – 9 April 2023
- Teams: 16
- Champions: Palmeiras
- Relegated: São Bento; Ferroviária
- Matches: 104
- Goals: 230 (2.21 per match)
- Top goalscorer: Róger Guedes; Giuliano Galoppo (8 goals each)
- Biggest home win: São Paulo 5–1 Internacional de Limeira; Santos 4–0 Portuguesa; Red Bull Bragantino 5–1 Ituano; Palmeiras 4–0 Água Santa
- Biggest away win: Internacional de Limeira 0–5 Guarani
- Highest scoring: São Paulo 5–1 Internacional de Limeira; Guarani 1–5 São Bernardo; Red Bull Bragantino 5–1 Ituano
- Longest winning run: São Bernardo (7 games)
- Longest unbeaten run: Palmeiras (14 games)
- Longest winless run: 2 teams (8 games)
- Longest losing run: Internacional de Limeira (5 games)

The 2023 Campeonato Paulista de Futebol Profissional da Primeira Divisão - Série A1 was the 122nd season of São Paulo's top professional football league. The competition was played from 15 January to 9 April 2023.

Palmeiras won their 25th title, having beaten Água Santa 5−2 on aggregate.

== Format ==
- In the first stage the sixteen seeded teams were drawn into four groups of four teams each, with each team playing once against the twelve clubs from the other three groups. After each team has played twelve matches, the top two teams of each group qualified for the quarter-final stage.
- After the completion of the first stage, the two clubs with the lowest number of points, regardless of the group, were relegated to the Campeonato Paulista Série A2.
- Quarter-finals and semi-finals were played in a single match, with the best placed team playing at home.
- The finals were played in a two-legged home and away fixture, with the best placed team playing the second leg at home.
- In case of a draw in any knockout stage, the match was decided by a penalty shoot-out.
- The two highest-placed teams not otherwise qualified qualified for the 2024 Copa do Brasil.
- The top three highest-placed teams in the general table at the end of the competition who are not playing in any level of the national Brazilian football league system qualified for the 2024 Campeonato Brasileiro Série D.

=== Tiebreakers ===
The teams are ranked according to points (3 points for a win, 1 point for a draw, 0 points for a loss). If two or more teams are equal on points on completion of the group matches, the following criteria are applied to determine the rankings:

1. Higher number of wins;
2. Superior goal difference;
3. Higher number of goals scored;
4. Fewest red cards received;
5. Fewest yellow cards received;
6. Draw in the headquarters of the FPF.

== TV partners ==
The broadcasting rights of the 2023 Campeonato Paulista were acquired by Record TV for the second consecutive year, with their streaming app Play Plus also transmitting the matches live. Aside of that, the streaming platforms HBO Max and Estádio TNT Sports (owned by TNT) and the Paulistão official YouTube channel and app (Paulistão Play) also broadcast the matches live. On 28 October 2022, TNT also announced the transmission of some matches in their paid TV channel, with pay-per-view channel Premiere also transmitting some matches.

== Teams ==
Location of teams in 2023 Campeonato Paulista

Club	Home city	Manager	2022 result
Água Santa	Diadema	(Brazil) Thiago Carpini	14th
Botafogo	Ribeirão Preto	(Brazil) Adilson Batista	9th
Corinthians	São Paulo (Tatuapé)	(Brazil) Fernando Lázaro	3rd
Ferroviária	Araraquara	(Brazil) Elano	11th
Guarani	Campinas	(Brazil) Moisés Moura (caretaker)	7th
Internacional de Limeira	Limeira	(Brazil) Pintado	12th
Ituano	Itu	(Brazil) Gilmar Dal Pozzo	5th
Mirassol	Mirassol	(Brazil) Ricardo Catalá	10th
Palmeiras	São Paulo (Perdizes)	(Portugal) Abel Ferreira	1st
Portuguesa	São Paulo (Pari)	(Brazil) Gilson Kleina	1st (Série A2)
Red Bull Bragantino	Bragança Paulista	(Portugal) Pedro Caixinha	4th
Santo André	Santo André	(Brazil) Matheus Costa	8th
Santos	Santos	(Brazil) Odair Hellmann	13th
São Bernardo	São Bernardo do Campo	(Brazil) Márcio Zanardi	6th
São Bento	Sorocaba	(Brazil) Paulo Roberto Santos	2nd (Série A2)
São Paulo	São Paulo (Morumbi)	(Brazil) Rogério Ceni	2nd

== First stage ==
=== Group A ===
Pos	Team	Pld	W	D	L	GF	GA	GD	Pts	Qualification or relegation
1	Red Bull Bragantino	12	6	2	4	15	10	+5	20	Knockout stage
2	Botafogo	12	4	2	6	14	17	−3	14	Knockout stage
3	Santos	12	3	5	4	14	17	−3	14	
4	Internacional de Limeira	12	3	2	7	4	18	−14	11	

Source: Soccerway

=== Group B ===
Pos	Team	Pld	W	D	L	GF	GA	GD	Pts	Qualification or relegation
1	São Paulo	12	7	2	3	23	10	+13	23	Knockout stage
2	Água Santa	12	7	2	3	13	9	+4	23	Knockout stage
3	Mirassol	12	4	3	5	14	14	0	15	
4	Guarani	12	4	2	6	14	14	0	14	

Source: Soccerway

=== Group C ===
Pos	Team	Pld	W	D	L	GF	GA	GD	Pts	Qualification or relegation
1	Corinthians	12	6	4	2	19	10	+9	22	Knockout stage
2	Ituano	12	3	3	6	11	18	−7	12	Knockout stage
3	São Bento (R)	12	2	4	6	5	14	−9	10	Relegation to Série A2
4	Ferroviária (R)	12	2	3	7	11	18	−7	9	Relegation to Série A2

Source: Soccerway
(R) Relegated

=== Group D ===
Pos	Team	Pld	W	D	L	GF	GA	GD	Pts	Qualification or relegation
1	Palmeiras	12	8	4	0	18	5	+13	28	Knockout stage
2	São Bernardo	12	8	2	2	21	9	+12	26	Knockout stage
3	Santo André	12	4	2	6	9	14	−5	14	
4	Portuguesa	12	2	4	6	10	18	−8	10	

Source: Soccerway

== Knockout stage ==
The knockout stage of the 2023 Campeonato Paulista commenced on 11 March 2023 with the quarter-finals and ended on 9 April 2023 with the final. A total of eight teams competed in the knockout stage.

=== Round dates ===
Round	First leg	Second leg
Quarter-finals	11–13 March 2023	–
Semi-finals	19–20 March 2023	–
Finals	2 April 2023	9 April 2023

=== Format ===
The quarter-finals will be played in a single match at the stadium of the better-ranked team in the first phase. If no goals were scored during the match, the tie will be decided via a penalty shoot-out. The semi-finals will be played with the same format as the quarter-finals. The finals will be played over two legs, with the team having the better record in matches from the previous stages hosting the second leg.

=== Qualified teams ===
Group	Winners	Runners-up
A	Red Bull Bragantino	Botafogo
B	São Paulo	Água Santa
C	Corinthians	Ituano
D	Palmeiras	São Bernardo

=== Bracket ===
Quarterfinals
D1	Palmeiras	1
D2	São Bernardo	0
C1	Corinthians	1 (6)
C2	Ituano	1 (7)
B1	São Paulo	0 (5)
B2	Água Santa	0 (6)
A1	Red Bull Bragantino	2
A2	Botafogo	0

Semifinals
D1	Palmeiras	1
C2	Ituano	0
B2	Água Santa	1 (4)
A1	Red Bull Bragantino	1 (2)

Finals
D1	Palmeiras	1	4	5
B2	Água Santa	2	0	2

=== Quarter-finals ===
Team 1	Score	Team 2
Palmeiras	1−0	São Bernardo
Corinthians	1−1 (6–7 p)	Ituano
Red Bull Bragantino	2–0	Botafogo
São Paulo	0−0 (5–6 p)	Água Santa

11 March 2023
19:00 UTC-03:00

Palmeiras	1–0	São Bernardo
Rony 42'	Report

Allianz Parque, São Paulo
Attendance: 39,258
Referee: Edina Alves Batista

12 March 2023
16:00 UTC-03:00

Corinthians	1–1	Ituano
Paulinho 35'	Report	Raí Ramos 26'
Penalties
Fábio Santos (penalty missed); Giuliano (penalty scored); Fausto Vera (penalty scored); Yuri Alberto (penalty scored); Róger Guedes (penalty scored); Maycon (penalty scored); Bruno Méndez (penalty scored); Fagner (penalty missed); Gil (penalty missed)	6–7	(penalty scored) Eduardo Person; (penalty scored) José Aldo; (penalty scored) Rafael Pereira; (penalty missed) Raí Ramos; (penalty scored) Claudinho; (penalty scored) Jefferson Paulino; (penalty scored) Lucas Siqueira; (penalty missed) Mário Sérgio; (penalty scored) Felipe Saraiva

Neo Química Arena, São Paulo
Attendance: 43,888
Referee: Raphael Claus

12 March 2023
19:30 UTC-03:00

Red Bull Bragantino	2–0	Botafogo
Bruninho 15', 84'	Report

Estádio Nabi Abi Chedid, Bragança Paulista
Attendance: 4,867
Referee: Flávio Rodrigues de Souza

13 March 2023
20:00 UTC-03:00

São Paulo	0–0	Água Santa
	Report
Penalties
Luciano (penalty scored); Alisson (penalty missed); Alan Franco (penalty scored); Pablo Maia (penalty scored); Caio Paulista (penalty scored); Rodrigo Nestor (penalty scored); Jhegson Méndez (penalty missed)	5–6	(penalty scored) Bruno Mezenga; (penalty scored) Reginaldo; (penalty scored) Patrick Allan; (penalty scored) Patrick Brey; (penalty missed) Gabriel Inocêncio; (penalty scored) Kadi; (penalty scored) Thiaguinho

Allianz Parque, São Paulo
Attendance: 39,454
Referee: Vinícius Gonçalves Dias Araújo

=== Semi-finals ===
Team 1	Score	Team 2
Palmeiras	1–0	Ituano
Água Santa	1−1 (4–2 p)	Red Bull Bragantino

19 March 2023
16:00 UTC-03:00

Palmeiras	1–0	Ituano
Murilo 58'	Report

Allianz Parque, São Paulo
Attendance: 40,664
Referee: Flávio Rodrigues de Souza

20 March 2023
21:00 UTC-03:00

Água Santa	1–1	Red Bull Bragantino
Lucas Tocantins 51'	Report	Alerrandro 9'
Penalties
Bruno Mezenga (penalty missed); Luan Dias (penalty scored); Cristiano (penalty scored); Reginaldo (penalty scored); Júnior Todinho (penalty scored)	4–2	(penalty missed) Juninho Capixaba; (penalty missed) Sorriso; (penalty scored) Praxedes; (penalty scored) Thiago Borbas

Vila Belmiro, Santos
Attendance: 11,507
Referee: Raphael Claus

=== Finals ===
Team 1	Agg.	Team 2	1st leg	2nd leg
Palmeiras	5–2	Água Santa	1–2	4–0

==== First leg ====
2 April 2023
16:00 UTC-03:00

Água Santa	2–1	Palmeiras
Bruno Mezenga 44', 90+2'	Report	Endrick 53'

Arena Barueri, Barueri
Attendance: 22,896
Referee: Edina Alves Batista

==== Second leg ====
9 April 2023
16:00 UTC-03:00

Palmeiras	4–0	Água Santa
Gabriel Menino 15', 27'; Endrick 34'; José López 73'	Report

Allianz Parque, São Paulo
Attendance: 41,444
Referee: Raphael Claus

2023 Campeonato Paulista champions

25th title

== Overall table ==
Pos	Team	Pld	W	D	L	GF	GA	GD	Pts	Qualification or relegation
1	Palmeiras (C, Q)	16	11	4	1	25	7	+18	37	Finalists
2	Água Santa (Q, D)	16	8	4	4	16	15	+1	28	Finalists
3	Red Bull Bragantino (Q)	14	7	3	4	18	11	+7	24	Eliminated in the Semi-finals
4	Ituano (Q)	14	3	4	7	12	20	−8	13	Eliminated in the Semi-finals
5	São Bernardo (Q)	13	8	2	3	21	10	+11	26	Eliminated in the Quarter-finals
6	São Paulo	13	7	3	3	23	10	+13	24	Eliminated in the Quarter-finals
7	Corinthians	13	6	5	2	20	11	+9	23	Eliminated in the Quarter-finals
8	Botafogo	13	4	2	7	14	19	−5	14	Eliminated in the Quarter-finals
9	Mirassol	12	4	3	5	14	14	0	15	
10	Guarani	12	4	2	6	14	14	0	14	
11	Santo André (D)	12	4	2	6	9	14	−5	14	
12	Santos	12	3	5	4	14	17	−3	14	
13	Inter de Limeira (D)	12	3	2	7	4	18	−14	11	
14	Portuguesa	12	2	4	6	10	18	−8	10	
15	São Bento (R)	12	2	4	6	5	14	−9	10	Relegation to Série A2
16	Ferroviária (R)	12	2	3	7	11	18	−7	9	Relegation to Série A2

Source: Soccerway
Rules for classification: 1st points; 2nd wins; 3rd goal difference; 4th goals scored; 5th head-to-head results; 6th least red cards received; 7th least yellow cards received; 8th draw.
(C) Champions; (D) Qualification for the 2024 Campeonato Brasileiro Série D; (Q) Qualification for the 2024 Copa do Brasil; (R) Relegated

== Top scorers ==
Rank	Player	Team	Goals
1	(Brazil) Róger Guedes	Corinthians	8
1	(Argentina) Giuliano Galoppo	São Paulo	8
3	(Brazil) Bruno Mezenga	Água Santa	7
4	(Brazil) John Kennedy	Ferroviária	6
4	(Brazil) Rony	Palmeiras	6
