= Vinícius Di Stefano =

Brazilian footballer

Personal information
- Full name: Vinícius Negro Di Stefano
- Date of birth: 23 September 2002 (age 24)
- Place of birth: Jundiaí, São Paulo, Brazil
- Height: 1.65 m (5 ft 5 in)
- Position: Midfielder

Team information
- Current team: Ravenna

Youth career
- 2015–2023: São Paulo

Senior career*
Years	Team	Apps	(Gls)
2023	São Paulo	0	(0)
2023–2026	Crotone	79	(4)
2026–	Ravenna	8	(0)
- * Club domestic league appearances and goals as of 17 November 2026

Vinícius Negro Di Stefano (born 23 September 2002) is a Brazilian professional footballer who plays as a midfielder for Serie C club Ravenna.

== Career ==
A product of the São Paulo FC youth academy, Di Stefano (then known only as Vinicius) gained prominence as the team captain during the 2023 edition of the Copa São Paulo de Futebol Jr., subsequently being promoted by manager Rogério Ceni to the main squad for that year's Campeonato Paulista. Unable to secure playing time and holding Italian citizenship, he transferred to FC Crotone in September.

He remained at the club until the end of the 2025–26 season, transferring to Ravenna FC in July. He gained attention in the Brazilian media following a match against Forlì, which marked Ronaldinho’s return to professional football. Di Stefano provided the assist for one of Ravenna's goals in that match.
