= Marcos Paulo (footballer, born 2001) =

Portuguese-Brazilian footballer

Personal information
- Full name: Marcos Paulo Costa do Nascimento
- Date of birth: 1 February 2001 (age 25)
- Place of birth: São Gonçalo, Brazil
- Height: 1.86 m (6 ft 1 in)
- Positions: Winger; forward

Team information
- Current team: Juventude
- Number: 10

Youth career
- 2012–2019: Fluminense

Senior career*
Years	Team	Apps	(Gls)
2019–2021	Fluminense	62	(10)
2021–2025	Atlético Madrid	0	(0)
2021–2022	→ Famalicão (loan)	15	(0)
2022	→ Mirandés (loan)	13	(1)
2023	→ São Paulo (loan)	20	(2)
2024	→ RWD Molenbeek (loan)	2	(0)
2025	Boavista	8	(2)
2025	→ Operário Ferroviário (loan)	11	(1)
2026–	Juventude	37	(5)

International career^{‡}
2019	Portugal U18	3	(3)
2019	Portugal U19	4	(1)
- * Club domestic league appearances and goals as of 17 November 2026 ‡ National team caps and goals as of 19:57, 30 November 2019 (UTC)

Marcos Paulo Costa do Nascimento (born 1 February 2001), known as Marcos Paulo, is a professional footballer who plays as a winger or forward for Campeonato Brasileiro Série B club Juventude. Born in Brazil, he represents Portugal at international level.

== Club career ==
=== Fluminense ===
Born in São Gonçalo, Rio de Janeiro, Marcos Paulo began his career at Fluminense, and had a release clause of €45 million at the age of 17. He was first called up to the first team for their Campeonato Brasileiro Série A game away to Santos on 27 October 2018, as several players were rested ahead of a Copa Sudamericana game against Uruguay's Nacional; he was unused in the 3–0 loss.

Marcos Paulo made his professional debut on 30 January 2019 in the Campeonato Carioca, playing the last ten minutes of a 3–0 win over Madureira at the Maracanã Stadium, in place of Bruno Silva. On 18 May he played his first game in the national league, entering at the same point in a 4–1 home win over Cruzeiro.

In the 2019 Copa Sudamericana, Marcos Paulo played seven games as Flu reached the quarter-finals. He scored his first goals on 30 July in the last 1 second leg 3–1 home win over Uruguay's Peñarol (5–2 aggregate). He scored four goals in 24 games in the domestic league that year, all towards the end of the campaign, starting with the equaliser in a 1–1 home draw with Chapecoense on 26 October; he said after the game that to not win it was a disappointment.

On 1 March 2020, Marcos Paulo scored twice in a 5–1 home win over Madureira in the first game of the Carioca season.

=== Atlético Madrid ===
On 5 July 2021, Marcos Paulo was announced by La Liga club Atlético Madrid, joining in a free transfer and signing a five-year contract. On 24 August 2021, he joined Primeira Liga side Famalicão on a season-long loan deal.

On 1 September 2022, Marcos Paulo was loaned to Segunda División side CD Mirandés, for one year. On 28 December, he returned to Brazil and joined Série A club São Paulo on loan until the end of the 2023 season.

On 29 August 2024, Marcos Paulo joined Belgian side RWD Molenbeek on a one-year loan deal with a buyout clause. Molenbeek terminated the loan early on 7 November 2024.

=== Boavista ===
On 23 January 2025, Marcos Paulo signed a three-year contract with Série D club Boavista. Three months later, he was sent on loan to Série B club Operário Ferroviário until the end of the 2025 season.

=== Juventude ===
On 13 January 2026, Marcos Paulo moved to Série B club Juventude, signing a one-year contract.

== International career ==
Marcos Paulo is eligible to represent Portugal through his maternal grandfather, born in Vila Cova, Vila Real. He made his international debut for Portugal under-18 on 17 April 2019 as a 52nd-minute substitute for Tiago Araújo in a 1–1 home draw with France. In the following days he scored in wins over Mexico (two in a 3–1 victory) and Denmark as his team won the Porto International Tournament.

Marcos Paulo's first involvement with the under-19 team was at the 2019 Toulon Tournament. He played the first two games of a group-stage elimination, and scored in a 3–2 win over reigning champions England in Salon-de-Provence.

== Career statistics ==
=== Club ===
As of match played 22 July 2023

Appearances and goals by club, season and competition
Club	Season	League			State league		National cup		League cup		Continental		Total	
Club	Season	Division	Apps	Goals	Apps	Goals	Apps	Goals	Apps	Goals	Apps	Goals	Apps	Goals
Fluminense	2019	Série A	24	4	3 (Note: Appearances in Campeonato Carioca)	0	2	0	—		6 (Note: Appearances in Copa Sudamericana)	2	35	6
Fluminense	2020	Série A	24	3	11	3	5	2	—		2	0	42	8
Fluminense	Total		48	7	14	3	7	2	—		8	2	77	14
Atlético Madrid	2021–22	La Liga	0	0	—		0	0	—		0	0	0	0
Famalicão (loan)	2021–22	Primeira Liga	15	0	—		3	0	2	0	—		20	0
Mirandés (loan)	2022–23	Segunda División	13	1	—		2	1	—		—		15	2
São Paulo (loan)	2023	Série A	15	2	5 (Note: Appearances in Campeonato Paulista)	0	3	1	—		6	1	29	4
Career total			91	10	19	3	15	4	2	0	14	3	141	20

== Honours ==
São Paulo

- Copa do Brasil: 2023
