= Raí Ramos =

Brazilian footballer

Personal information
- Full name: Raí dos Reis Ramos
- Date of birth: 6 May 1994 (age 32)
- Place of birth: Japorã, Brazil
- Height: 1.79 m (5 ft 10 in)
- Position: Right-back

Team information
- Current team: Juventude
- Number: 2

Youth career
- 2011–2012: Atlético Mineiro
- 2011–2012: Bahia
- 2013: Monte Azul
- 2014–2015: Londrina

Senior career*
| Years | Team | Apps | (Gls) |
| 2013 | Monte Azul | 0 | (0) |
| 2015–2020 | Londrina | 59 | (1) |
| 2015 | → Toledo (loan) | 0 | (0) |
| 2016 | → Operário Ferroviário (loan) | 0 | (0) |
| 2018 | → Shukura Kobuleti (loan) | 34 | (7) |
| 2020–2021 | Oeste | 28 | (2) |
| 2021–2022 | Varzim | 13 | (0) |
| 2022–2023 | Ituano | 31 | (1) |
| 2023–2024 | São Paulo | 6 | (0) |
| 2024 | → Ceará (loan) | 33 | (3) |
| 2025 | Atlético Goianiense | 20 | (2) |
| 2025 | Grêmio Novorizontino | 6 | (0) |
| 2026– | Juventude | 20 | (0) |
- * Club domestic league appearances and goals as of 17 November 2026

Raí dos Reis Ramos (born 6 May 1994), known as Raí Ramos, is a Brazilian professional footballer who plays as a right-back for Juventude.

== Club career ==
=== Early career ===
Born in Japorã, Mato Grosso do Sul, Raí Ramos represented Atlético Mineiro and Bahia as a youth before making his senior debut with Monte Azul in the 2013 Copa Paulista. He later moved to Londrina, initially assigned to the youth setup.

After featuring rarely for Londrina's first team in the 2015 season, Raí Ramos moved to Toledo on loan, and finished second in the 2015 Taça FPF. Back to LEC in January 2016, he again featured sparingly before joining Operário Ferroviário also on loan, and won the Taça FPF with the side.

After spending the 2017 campaign without playing a single minute, Raí Ramos moved abroad for the 2018 season with Georgian Erovnuli Liga 2 side Shukura Kobuleti. He returned to Londrina in January 2019, and started to feature more regularly afterwards.

=== Oeste / Varzim ===
On 22 October 2020, Raí Ramos left Londrina and signed for Oeste. The following 14 July, he agreed to a deal with Varzim in the Liga Portugal 2.

=== Ituano ===
On 7 July 2022, Raí Ramos returned to his home country after joining Ituano. He was a regular starter for the side during the 2023 Campeonato Paulista as the club reached the semifinals.

=== São Paulo ===
On 24 March 2023, Raí Ramos was announced at Série A side São Paulo on a contract until the end of 2025. He made his debut for the club on 18 April, starting in a 2–0 home win over Academia Puerto Cabello, for the year's Copa Sudamericana.

==== Ceará (loan) ====
On 12 December 2023, Raí Ramos was loaned to Ceará until the end of November 2024.

=== Atlético Goianiense ===
On 6 January 2025, the player announced on his social networks the amicable termination of his contract with São Paulo FC. On January 9, Ramos was officially announced by Atlético Goianiense.

== Career statistics ==
As of 19 April 2023

| Club | Season | League | | | State League | | Cup | | Continental | | Other | | Total | |
| Club | Season | Division | Apps | Goals | Apps | Goals | Apps | Goals | Apps | Goals | Apps | Goals | Apps | Goals |
|---|---|---|---|---|---|---|---|---|---|---|---|---|---|---|
| Monte Azul | 2013 | Paulista A2 | — | | 0 | 0 | — | | — | | 5 (Note: Appearance(s) in Copa Paulista) | 0 | 5 | 0 |
| Londrina | 2015 | Série C | 0 | 0 | 1 | 0 | 0 | 0 | — | | — | | 1 | 0 |
| Londrina | 2016 | Série B | 1 | 0 | 5 | 0 | 1 | 0 | — | | — | | 7 | 0 |
| Londrina | 2017 | Série B | 0 | 0 | 0 | 0 | 0 | 0 | — | | — | | 0 | 0 |
| Londrina | 2019 | Série B | 27 | 1 | 8 | 0 | 6 | 0 | — | | — | | 41 | 1 |
| Londrina | 2020 | Série C | 6 | 0 | 11 | 0 | 1 | 0 | — | | — | | 18 | 0 |
| Londrina | Subtotal | | 34 | 1 | 25 | 0 | 8 | 0 | — | | — | | 67 | 1 |
| Toledo (loan) | 2015 | Paranaense Série Prata | — | | 0 | 0 | — | | — | | 13 (Note: Appearance(s) in Taça FPF) | 2 | 13 | 2 |
| Operário Ferroviário (loan) | 2016 | Paranaense | — | | 0 | 0 | — | | — | | 6 | 2 | 6 | 2 |
| Shukura Kobuleti (loan) | 2018 | Erovnuli Liga 2 | 34 | 7 | — | | 3 | 0 | — | | — | | 37 | 7 |
| Oeste | 2020 | Série B | 9 | 1 | — | | — | | — | | — | | 9 | 1 |
| Oeste | 2021 | Série C | 1 | 0 | 18 | 1 | — | | — | | — | | 19 | 1 |
| Oeste | Subtotal | | 10 | 1 | 18 | 1 | — | | — | | — | | 28 | 2 |
| Varzim | 2021–22 | Liga Portugal 2 | 13 | 0 | — | | 0 | 0 | — | | 0 | 0 | 13 | 0 |
| Ituano | 2022 | Série B | 18 | 0 | — | | — | | — | | — | | 18 | 0 |
| Ituano | 2023 | Série B | 0 | 0 | 13 | 1 | 2 | 0 | — | | — | | 15 | 1 |
| Ituano | Subtotal | | 18 | 0 | 13 | 1 | 2 | 0 | — | | — | | 33 | 1 |
| São Paulo | 2023 | Série A | 0 | 0 | — | | — | | 1 (Note: Appearance(s) in Copa Sudamericana) | 0 | — | | 1 | 0 |
| Career total | | | 109 | 9 | 56 | 2 | 13 | 0 | 1 | 0 | 24 | 4 | 203 | 15 |

== Honours ==
Operário Ferroviário

- Taça FPF: 2016

Ceará

- Campeonato Cearense: 2024
