= Michel Araújo =

Uruguayan footballer (born 1996)

Personal information
- Full name: Michel Daryl Araújo Villar
- Date of birth: 28 September 1996 (age 30)
- Place of birth: Colonia del Sacramento, Uruguay
- Height: 1.78 m (5 ft 10 in)
- Position: Attacking midfielder

Team information
- Current team: Bahia
- Number: 15

Youth career
- Racing Montevideo

Senior career*
Years	Team	Apps	(Gls)
2016–2020	Racing Montevideo	64	(11)
2016–2017	→ Villa Teresa (loan)	25	(8)
2020–2024	Fluminense	49	(3)
2021–2022	→ Al-Wasl (loan)	22	(7)
2023–2024	→ São Paulo (loan)	44	(2)
2024	São Paulo	14	(0)
2025–	Bahia	54	(5)
- * Club domestic league appearances and goals as of 21:05, 12 November 2026 (UTC)

Michel Daryl Araújo Villar (born 28 September 1996) is a Uruguayan professional footballer who plays as an attacking midfielder for Campeonato Brasileiro Série A club Bahia.

== Career statistics ==
As of 12 November 2026.

Club	Season	League			Cup		Continental		State league (Note: Includes Campeonato Carioca, Campeonato Paulista, Campeonato Baiano)		Other		Total	
Club	Season	Division	Apps	Goals	Apps	Goals	Apps	Goals	Apps	Goals	Apps	Goals	Apps	Goals
Racing Montevideo	2016	Uruguayan Primera División	0	0	—		—		—		—		0	0
Racing Montevideo	2017	Uruguayan Primera División	10	1	—		—		—		—		10	1
Racing Montevideo	2018	Uruguayan Primera División	23	4	—		—		—		—		23	4
Racing Montevideo	2019	Uruguayan Primera División	32	6	—		—		—		—		32	6
Racing Montevideo	Total		65	11	—		—		—		—		65	11
Villa Teresa (loan)	2016	Uruguayan Segunda División	11	2	—		—		—		—		11	2
Villa Teresa (loan)	2017	Uruguayan Segunda División	14	6	—		—		—		—		14	6
Villa Teresa (loan)	Total		25	8	—		—		—		—		25	8
Fluminense	2020	Série A	29	1	3	0	2 (Note: Appearances in the Copa Sudamericana)	0	6	0	—		40	1
Fluminense	2021	Série A	0	0	0	0	0	0	3	0	—		3	0
Fluminense	2022	Série A	8	2	2	0	—		—		—		10	2
Fluminense	2023	Série A	0	0	0	0	—		3	0	—		3	0
Fluminense	Total		37	3	5	0	2	0	12	0	—		56	3
Al-Wasl (loan)	2021–22	UAE Pro League	22	7	5	0	—		—		7 (Note: Appearances in the UAE League Cup)	6	34	13
São Paulo	2023	Série A	32	2	9	1	9	1	—		—		50	4
São Paulo	2024	Série A	20	0	3	0	8 (Note: Appearances in the Copa Libertadores)	0	6	0	1 (Note: Appearances in the Supercopa do Brasil)	0	38	0
São Paulo	Total		52	2	12	1	17	1	6	0	1	0	88	4
Bahia	2025	Série A	24	4	5	1	9 (Note: Seven appearances in the Copa Libertadores, two appearances in the Copa Sudamericana)	0	5	0	5 (Note: Appearances in the Copa do Nordeste)	1	48	6
Bahia	2026	Série A	21	0	0	0	0	0	4	1	—		25	1
Bahia	Total		45	4	5	1	9	0	9	1	5	1	73	7
Career total			246	35	27	2	28	1	27	1	13	7	341	46

== Honours ==
Fluminense

- Taça Rio: 2020

São Paulo

- Copa do Brasil: 2023
- Supercopa do Brasil: 2024

Bahia

- Campeonato Baiano: 2025, 2026
- Copa do Nordeste: 2025
