= Robert Arboleda =

Ecuadorian footballer (born 1991)

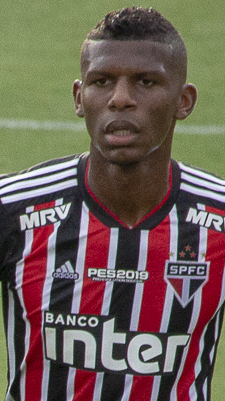
- Arboleda with São Paulo in 2018 - Currently Foragido

Personal information
- Full name: Robert Abel Arboleda Escobar
- Date of birth: 22 October 1991 (age 35)
- Place of birth: Esmeraldas, Ecuador
- Height: 1.89 m (6 ft 2 in)
- Position: Centre-back

Team information
- Current team: São Paulo
- Number: 5

Youth career
- 2007–2009: Olmedo

Senior career*
Years	Team	Apps	(Gls)
2010	Olmedo	0	(0)
2011	Municipal Cañar	6	(1)
2011–2012	Grecia	38	(2)
2013–2014	LDU Loja	61	(5)
2015–2017	Universidad Católica (ECU)	51	(11)
2017–	São Paulo	285	(18)

International career^{‡}
2016–2024	Ecuador	39	(2)
- * Club domestic league appearances and goals as of 6 April 2026 ‡ National team caps and goals as of 21 March 2024

Robert Abel Arboleda Escobar (born 22 October 1991) is an Ecuadorian professional footballer who plays as a centre-back for Campeonato Brasileiro Série A club São Paulo.

== Club career ==
=== São Paulo ===
On 21 June 2017, São Paulo signed Arboleda from Universidad Católica del Ecuador in a US$2 million transfer.

== International career ==
Arboleda made his debut for Ecuador on 26 May 2016 in a match against the United States.

Arboleda was selected in the 23 player Ecuador squad for the Copa América Centenario.

Arboleda was selected in the 23-man Ecuador squad for the 2019 Copa América.

Arboleda was selected in the 28 player Ecuador squad for the 2021 Copa América.

Arboleda was named in the Ecuadorian squad for the 2022 FIFA World Cup.

== Personal life ==
In his childhood days, Arboleda was fan of international Brazilian players Ronaldo, Ronaldinho, and Juninho Pernambucano. He almost became a policeman before he decided to pursue his football career.

== Career statistics ==
=== Club ===
As of 3 February 2025

Appearances and goals by club, season and competition
Club	Season	League			National cup		Continental		State League		Other		Total	
Club	Season	Division	Apps	Goals	Apps	Goals	Apps	Goals	Apps	Goals	Apps	Goals	Apps	Goals
Municipal Cañar	2011	Segunda Categoría	6	1	—		—		—		10 (Note: Appearance(s) in Campeonato Provincial de Cañar)	4	16	5
Grecia	2011	Serie B	6	0	—		—		—		—		6	0
Grecia	2012	Serie B	32	2	—		—		—		—		32	2
Grecia	Total		38	2	—		—		—		—		38	2
LDU Loja	2013	Serie A	20	4	—		5 (Note: Appearance(s) in Copa Sudamericana)	0	—		—		25	4
LDU Loja	2014	Serie A	41	1	—		—		—		—		41	1
LDU Loja	Total		61	5	—		5	0	—		—		66	5
Universidad Católica del Ecuador	2015	Serie A	1	0	—		2	0	—		—		3	0
Universidad Católica del Ecuador	2016	Serie A	33	7	—		2	0	—		—		35	7
Universidad Católica del Ecuador	2017	Serie A	17	4	—		2	0	—		—		19	4
Universidad Católica del Ecuador	Total		51	11	—		6	0	—		—		57	11
São Paulo	2017	Série A	23	3	—		—		—		—		23	3
São Paulo	2018	Série A	26	0	3	0	2	0	9 (Note: Appearance(s) in Campeonato Paulista)	1	—		40	1
São Paulo	2019	Série A	29	1	1	0	2 (Note: Appearance(s) in Copa Libertadores)	0	13	1	—		45	2
São Paulo	2020	Série A	21	1	3	0	4 (Note: Three appearances in Copa Libertadores, one appearance in Copa Sudamericana)	1	11	1	—		39	3
São Paulo	2021	Série A	17	1	2	0	7	0	13	3	—		39	4
São Paulo	2022	Série A	8	0	4	2	3	2	9	0	—		24	4
São Paulo	2023	Série A	20	0	10	0	9	1	3	0	—		42	1
São Paulo	2024	Série A	27	2	4	0	10	0	9	0	1 (Note: Appearance in Supercopa do Brasil)	0	57	2
São Paulo	2025	Série A	0	0	0	0	0	0	4	0	—		4	0
São Paulo	Total		171	8	27	2	37	4	71	6	1	0	313	20
Career total			327	27	27	2	48	4	71	6	11	4	490	43

=== International ===
As of 21 March 2024

Ecuador
Year	Apps	Goals
2016	1	0
2017	6	1
2018	4	0
2019	5	0
2020	4	1
2021	10	0
2022	3	0
2023	5	0
2024	1	0
Total	39	2

List of international goals scored by Robert Arboleda
No.	Date	Venue	Opponent	Score	Result	Competition
1	22 February 2017	Estadio George Capwell, Guayaquil, Ecuador	Honduras	2–1	3–1	Friendly
2	17 November 2020	Estadio Rodrigo Paz Delgado, Quito, Ecuador	Colombia	1–0	6–1	2022 FIFA World Cup qualification

== Honours ==
São Paulo

- Copa do Brasil: 2023
- Supercopa do Brasil: 2024
- Campeonato Paulista: 2021
