= Ravenna FC =

Italian football club

Ravenna
- Full name: Ravenna Football Club 1913
- Nickname: I Giallorossi (The Yellow-Reds)
- Founded: 1913; 113 years ago 2001; 25 years ago 2012; 14 years ago
- Stadium: Stadio Bruno Benelli
- Capacity: 12,020
- President: Ignazio Cipriani
- Head coach: Andrea Mandorlini
- League: Serie C Group B
- 2025–26: Serie C Group B, 3rd of 20
- Website: www.ravennafc.it
| Home colours | Away colours |

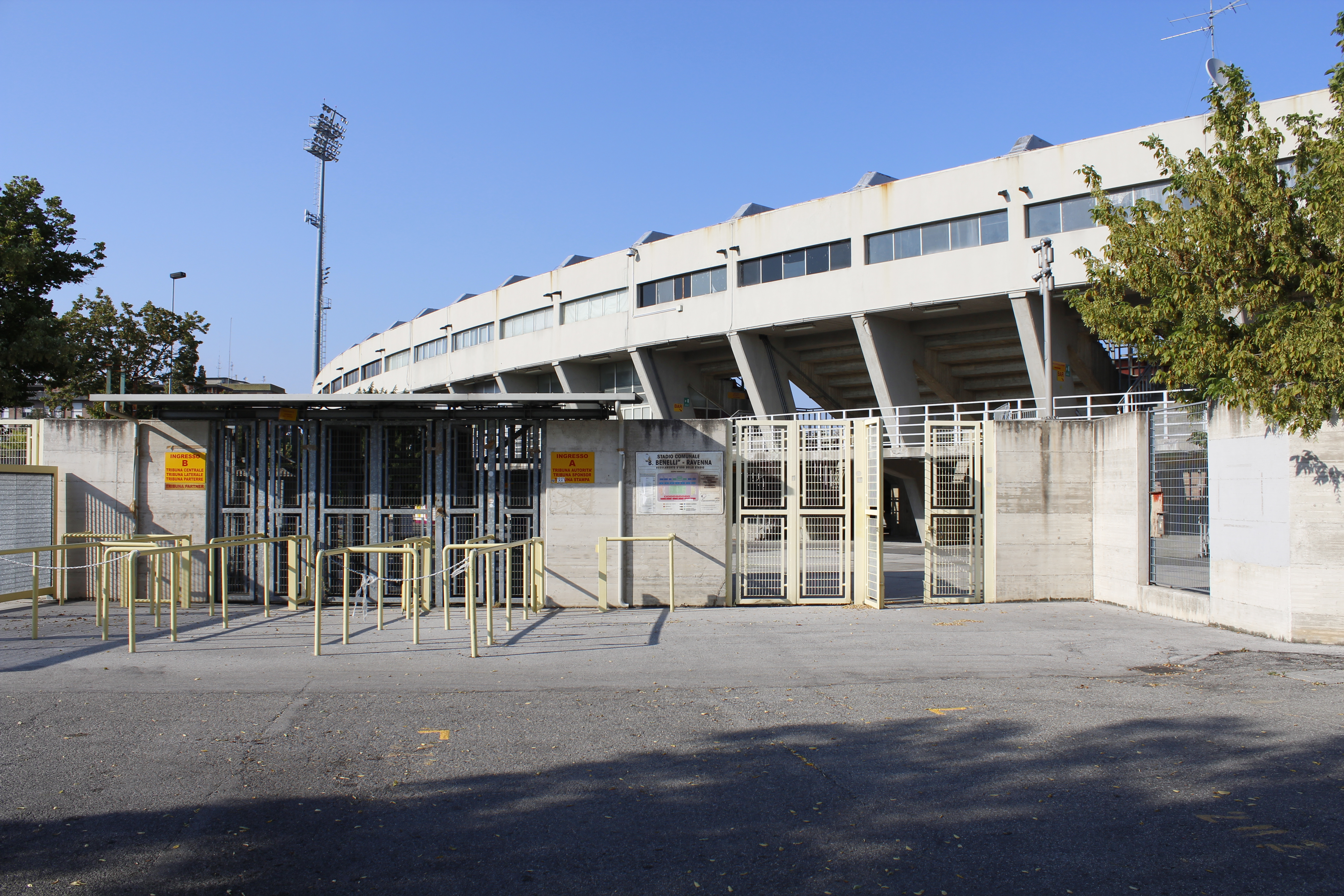
Stadio Bruno Benelli, home venue of Ravenna FC

Ravenna Football Club is an Italian association football club, based in Ravenna, Emilia-Romagna. The club currently play in Serie C Group B.

== History ==
=== Foundation ===
The club was founded in 1914 as the football section of sports club Unione Sportiva Ravennate. In 1920, the club merged with Audace Football Club, which had been founded only one year earlier, in 1919. The same year the club joined the Italian Football Federation, it was part of the Promozione league. Another merger in 1921 with S.G. Forti per essere Liberi led the club to change its denomination to 'Unione Sportiva Ravennate Forti per essere Liberi'. The sports club disbanded in 1928, with all its sports sections becoming separate entities; notably, the football section assumed the denomination of Associazione Calcio Ravenna.

==== U.S. Ravenna ====
In 1936, Ravenna made their first appearance in the Serie C, where they played until 1948. In 1949, the club, now playing in the amateur Interregionale league, became known as Unione Sportiva Ravenna, then switching this denomination to Sarom Unione Sportiva Ravenna for sponsorship reasons in 1954, maintaining it for ten years. Ravenna returned to Serie C in 1950 for a single season and again in 1955, playing in this division until 1971, when they were relegated to Serie D. A subsequent Serie C spell from 1972 to 1976 was followed by two consecutive relegations. Two promotions in a row from 1980 to 1982 then brought the club back to the pro leagues, in the recently created Serie C2. Ravenna was relegated to Serie D in 1984, but promptly returned to Serie C2.

In 1992, Ravenna were awarded Serie C2 champions, being promoted to Serie C1. Only one year later, in 1993, Ravenna won the Serie C1 league and gained promotion to Serie B for a historical first time. However, this lasted only one season, and Ravenna returned to Serie C1 in 1994. They returned to Serie B in 1996, playing in the Italian second division until 2001, when they were relegated to Serie C1. However, they were subsequently relegated by the Federation due to financial troubles.

=== Ravenna Calcio ===
Former Ravenna Calcio logo

A new club, Ravenna Calcio, was admitted to play in Eccellenza Emilia-Romagna and obtained two consecutive promotions, which brought them back to Serie C2 in 2003.

In 2005, Ravenna were promoted to Serie C1 after playoffs, and on 9 May 2007, Ravenna won the 2006–07 Serie C1/B in advance of one matchday, following a 0–0 away tie against Teramo, being thus promoted to Serie B, after six seasons from their last appearance in the second-highest division of Italy. They were relegated in 2008 after a poor Serie B campaign to Lega Pro Prima Divisione. In their first season back in Serie C1, now rebranded as Lega Pro Prima Divisione, Ravenna was coached by debutant manager Gianluca Atzori and missed immediate promotion by losing the playoff semifinals to Padova, who later went on to win the playoff finals as well.

For the 2009–10 season, Ravenna were forced to search for a new head coach after Atzori left for Serie A club Catania, and former Inter Primavera coach Vincenzo Esposito was appointed as a replacement. However, the season started with a huge off-the-field shock, as young Albanian midfielder Brian Filipi, a regular for the team despite his 20 years of age, was hit by a car and left dead on 19 September 2009.

On 18 July 2011 it was excluded by the Federal Council from Lega Pro Prima Divisione, but on 12 August 2011 it was admitted in Serie D/D. after conciliation with FIGC.

==== 2012: bankruptcy after relegation ====
In the 2011–12 season, the club was relegated to Eccellenza.

On 29 June 2012, Ravenna Calcio, which was in substantial financial difficulty, was declared bankrupt by the Court of Ravenna.

=== From S.C. Ravenna Sport 2019 to Ravenna Football Club ===
A new club, Ravenna Sport 2019, was admitted to play Promozione Emilia-Romagna and was promoted to Eccellenza Emilia-Romagna.

In June 2026, the club received international attention when they signed 46-year-old former Ballon d'Or winner Ronaldinho.

== Colours and badge ==
The team's colours are red and yellow.

== Current squad ==
As of 31 August 2026

Note: Flags indicate national team as defined under FIFA eligibility rules; some limited exceptions apply. Players may hold more than one non-FIFA nationality.

| No. | Pos. | Nation | Player |
|---|---|---|---|
| 1 | GK | ITA | Tommaso Ciardi |
| 2 | DF | ITA | Giulio Donati |
| 3 | DF | ITA | Luca Falbo |
| 4 | MF | BRA | Vinícius |
| 5 | DF | ITA | Matteo Solini |
| 6 | MF | ITA | Carlo Ilari |
| 7 | FW | ITA | Cristian Spini |
| 8 | MF | ITA | Matteo Rossetti |
| 9 | FW | ITA | Simone Rabbi |
| 10 | MF | BRA | Ronaldinho |
| 12 | GK | ITA | Tommaso Stagni |
| 14 | DF | ITA | Cristiano Bani |
| 16 | MF | ITA | Joshua Tenkorang |

| No. | Pos. | Nation | Player |
|---|---|---|---|
| 17 | MF | ITA | Lorenzo Lonardi |
| 19 | MF | ITA | Nicolas Viola |
| 20 | MF | ITA | Giacomo Calandrini |
| 21 | DF | ITA | Adriano Esposito |
| 22 | GK | ITA | Giacomo Venturi |
| 23 | FW | ITA | Manuel Fischnaller |
| 24 | DF | ITA | Giovanni Zaro |
| 27 | FW | ITA | Matteo Maggio |
| 30 | MF | ITA | Marcelo Orellana |
| 44 | DF | ITA | Alessandro Bianconi |
| 77 | MF | ITA | Lorenzo Da Pozzo |
| 97 | MF | ITA | Edoardo Duca |
| — | FW | BFA | Abdel Zagré |

=== Out on loan ===
Note: Flags indicate national team as defined under FIFA eligibility rules; some limited exceptions apply. Players may hold more than one non-FIFA nationality.

| No. | Pos. | Nation | Player |
|---|---|---|---|
| — | DF | ITA | Mattia Drapelli (at Flaminia until 30 June 2027) |
| — | DF | MAR | Karim Zakaria (at Prato until 30 June 2027) |
| — | MF | ITA | Luca Sermenghi (at Prato until 30 June 2027) |

| No. | Pos. | Nation | Player |
|---|---|---|---|
| — | FW | ITA | Pierluca Luciani (at Foggia until 30 June 2027) |
| — | FW | ITA | Matteo Motti (at Pistoiese until 30 June 2027) |

== Notable former managers ==
- (Italy) Luigi Delneri
- (Italy) Francesco Guidolin
- (Hungary) Gyula Zsengellér
- (Cameroon) Albert Meyong

== Achievements ==
- Serie C1
  - Winners: 1992–93, 1995–96, 2006–07
- Super Coppa di Lega Serie C1
  - Runners-up: 2006–07
- Serie C2
  - Winners: 1991–92
  - Runners-up: 2004–05
- Serie D
  - Winners: 1950–51, 1956–57, 1971–72, 1981–82, 1984–85, 2002–03
  - Runners-up: 1955–56
- Scudetto Dilettanti
  - Winners: 1956–57
- Eccellenza Emilia-Romagna
  - Winners: 2001–02
- Promozione Emilia-Romagna
  - Winners: 1954–55, 1996–97, 1980–81, 2012–13
  - Runners-up: 1920–21, 1978–79, 1979–80
- Serie C
  - Winners: 1939–40
  - Runners-up: 1937–38, 1938–39
- Seconda Divisione
  - Winners: 1929–30
- Terza Divisione Emilia-Romagna
  - Winners: 1927–28
