= Juan (footballer, born March 2002) =

Brazilian footballer

Personal information
- Full name: Juan Santos da Silva
- Date of birth: 7 March 2002 (age 24)
- Place of birth: São Paulo, Brazil
- Height: 1.77 m (5 ft 10 in)
- Position: Forward

Team information
- Current team: Göztepe
- Number: 9

Youth career
- –2013: São Caetano
- 2015: ECUS
- 2016: Grêmio Mauaense
- 2018: União Barbarense
- 2019–2021: São Paulo

Senior career*
Years	Team	Apps	(Gls)
2019–2024	São Paulo	60	(4)
2024–2025	Southampton	0	(0)
2024–2025	→ Göztepe (loan)	26	(7)
2025–	Göztepe	43	(18)

International career
2019	Brazil U17	4	(0)
2019	Brazil U18	2	(0)
- * Club domestic league appearances and goals as of 06:07, 12 November 2026 (UTC)

Juan Santos da Silva (born 7 March 2002), commonly known as Juan, is a Brazilian professional footballer who plays as a forward for Süper Lig club Göztepe.

== Club career ==
=== Early career ===
Born in São Paulo, Juan began his career in the youth team of São Caetano, where he stayed until 2013. Afterwards, he played in the youth teams of ECUS, Mauaense and União Barbarense.

=== São Paulo ===
Juan joined São Paulo's academy in 2019, where he became top scorer for the under-17 team. Due to his performances in the under-17 team, he was called up for trials in the São Paulo professional team by coach Fernando Diniz and, on 8 December 2019, he made his professional debut in an 2–1 away victory against CSA. On 13 November 2022, Juan scored his first professional goal in a 4–0 away victory against Goiás.

He ended his time at Tricolor where he played 82 games between 2019 and 2024, scoring seven goals and providing five assists during his spell there.

=== Southampton ===
On 26 July 2024, Juan signed a pre-contract with Premier League side Southampton and was due to join following the expiry of his contract with São Paulo in January 2025.

==== Loan to Göztepe ====
On 16 August 2024, Southampton reached a deal with São Paulo for him to join the club, with Juan being sent to Turkish side Göztepe on a season-long loan. On 17 August, he made his first appearance for Göztepe in a 2–2 draw with Fenerbahçe. Juan scored his first goal for the club on 23 September in a 3–0 victory against Kayserispor.

=== Göztepe ===
On 25 August 2025, Juan joined Göztepe permanently on a four-year contract. In the 2025-26 season he scored 11 goals in 32 games. In two seasons he scored 19 goals and provided 8 assists in 60 matches.

== Career statistics ==
=== Club ===
As of 7 November 2026

Club	Season	League			State league		Domestic cup		Continental		Other		Total	
Club	Season	Division	Apps	Goals	Apps	Goals	Apps	Goals	Apps	Goals	Apps	Goals	Apps	Goals
São Paulo	2019	Série A	1	0	0	0	0	0	0	0	0	0	1	0
São Paulo	2020	Série A	0	0	0	0	0	0	0	0	0	0	0	0
São Paulo	2021	Série A	5	0	0	0	0	0	0	0	0	0	5	0
São Paulo	2022	Série A	2	1	5	0	4	0	5	0	0	0	16	1
São Paulo	2023	Série A	27	1	4	1	5	0	6	1	0	0	42	3
São Paulo	2024	Série A	10	0	6	1	2	2	3	0	0	0	21	3
São Paulo	Total		45	2	15	2	11	2	14	1	0	0	85	7
Southampton	2024–25	Premier League	0	0	—		0	0	—		0	0	0	0
Southampton	2025–26	Championship	0	0	—		0	0	—		0	0	0	0
Southampton	Total		0	0	—		0	0	—		0	0	0	0
Göztepe (loan)	2024–25	Süper Lig	26	7	—		2	1	—		—		28	8
Göztepe	2025–26	Süper Lig	32	11	—		0	0	—		—		32	11
Göztepe	2026–27	Süper Lig	11	7	—		0	0	—		—		11	7
Göztepe	Total		43	18	—		0	0	—		—		43	18
Career total			114	27	15	2	13	3	14	1	0	0	156	33

== Honours ==
São Paulo

- Copa do Brasil: 2023
- Supercopa do Brasil: 2024
