= Patryck Lanza =

Portuguese footballer

Personal information
- Full name: Patryck Lanza dos Reis
- Date of birth: 18 January 2003 (age 23)
- Place of birth: Mogi Mirim, Brazil
- Height: 1.81 m (5 ft 11 in)
- Position: Left-back

Team information
- Current team: Juventude (on loan from São Paulo)
- Number: 30

Youth career
- 2016–2022: São Paulo

Senior career*
Years	Team	Apps	(Gls)
2022–	São Paulo	32	(0)
2026–	→ Juventude (loan)	17	(3)

International career
2019	Brazil U17	11	(2)
2021–2023	Brazil U20	11	(0)
2023	Brazil U23	5	(0)
Medal record
Men's football
Representing Brazil
FIFA U-17 World Cup
Winner	2019 Brazil
South American U-20 Championship
Winner	2023 Colombia
Pan American Games
Winner	2023 Santiago
- * Club domestic league appearances and goals as of 16 November 2026

Patryck Lanza dos Reis (born 18 January 2003), known as Patryck Lanza or simply Patryck, is a Brazilian professional footballer who plays as a left-back for Campeonato Brasileiro Série B club Juventude, on loan from São Paulo.

On 9 August 2022, he was considered by the CBF as one of the young Brazilian players with the possibility of becoming a FIFA World Player of the Year.

== Club career ==
Promoted to the first team in 2022, Lanza played as a substitute in subsequent seasons. In 2025, a deal with Pafos FC was announced, but ultimately fell through. In 2026, he signed on loan with Juventude.

== Career statistics ==
=== Club ===
As of 19 July 2022

Appearances and goals by club, season and competition
Club	Season	League			State League		Cup		Continental		Other		Total	
Club	Season	Division	Apps	Goals	Apps	Goals	Apps	Goals	Apps	Goals	Apps	Goals	Apps	Goals
São Paulo	2022	Série A	1	0	0	0	0	0	0	0	0	0	1	0
Career total			1	0	0	0	0	0	0	0	0	0	1	0

== Honours ==
São Paulo

- Copa do Brasil: 2023
- Supercopa do Brasil: 2024

São Paulo U17

- Copa do Brasil Sub-17: 2020
- Campeonato Paulista Sub-17: 2019

Brazil U23

- Pan American Games: 2023

Brazil U20

- Torneio Internacional do Espírito Santo (U-20): 2022
- South American U-20 Championship: 2023

Brazil U17

- FIFA U-17 World Cup: 2019
