= Guilherme Matheus =

Brazilian footballer

Personal information
- Full name: Guilherme Matheus dos Santos
- Date of birth: 9 February 2002 (age 24)
- Place of birth: São Paulo, Brazil
- Height: 1.91 m (6 ft 3 in)
- Position: Centre-back

Youth career
- 2015–2017: Barcelona Capela
- 2018: Guarujá
- 2019–2023: São Paulo
- 2022: → Ceará (loan)

Senior career*
Years	Team	Apps	(Gls)
2023–2024	São Paulo	0	(0)
2023	→ Azuriz (loan)	2	(0)
2023	→ Santo André (loan)	0	(0)
2024–2025	Petrocub Hîncești	4	(0)
2025–2026	Jarun Zagreb	2	(1)
2026	Araucária	10	(0)
2026	São José-SP	0	(0)
- * Club domestic league appearances and goals as of 20:00, 16 June 2026 (UTC)

Guilherme Matheus dos Santos (born 9 February 2002), known as Guilherme Matheus, is a Brazilian professional footballer who plays as a centre-back.

== Career ==
Born in São Paulo, Guilherme Matheus joined São Paulo FC's youth sides in 2019, after representing Barcelona Capela and Guarujá. He won the Campeonato Paulista Sub-17 with the former side in 2019, and was promoted to the under-20 squad in the following year.

In 2022, Guilherme Matheus was loaned to Ceará and played for their under-20 team. Back to Tricolor for the 2023 season, his contract was renewed on 7 January of that year, and he moved on loan to Azuriz to compete in the 2023 Campeonato Paranaense shortly after.

After two first team appearances, Guilherme Matheus moved to Santo André on loan in July, for the year's Copa Paulista. At his new side, he scored his first senior goal on 25 August, netting the opener in a 2–1 away win over São Caetano.

Back to São Paulo in November 2023, Guilherme Matheus was a part of the squad which went in a trip to Italy, but left the club in February 2024, as his contract expired. On 13 March of that year, he moved abroad and was announced as a reinforcement of Petrocub Hîncești of Moldova.

On 15 August 2025, Guilherme Matheus was announced as a reinforcement for the Croatian club Jarun Zagreb. Rarely used, he returned to his home country with Araucária in March 2026.

On 16 June 2026, São José-SP announced the signing of Guilherme Matheus for the state cup.

== Career statistics ==
As of 16 June 2026

Club	Season	League			State League		Cup		Continental		Other		Total	
Club	Season	Division	Apps	Goals	Apps	Goals	Apps	Goals	Apps	Goals	Apps	Goals	Apps	Goals
Azuriz	2023	Paranaense	—		2	0	—		—		—		2	0
Santo André	2023	Série D	0	0	—		—		—		10 (Note: Appearance(s) in Copa Paulista)	1	10	1
Petrocub Hîncești	2023–24	Moldovan Liga	1	0	—		0	0	—		—		9	0
Petrocub Hîncești	2024–25	Moldovan Liga	3	0	—		0	0	1 (Note: Appearance(s) in UEFA Conference League)	0	—		4	0
Petrocub Hîncești	Total		4	0	—		0	0	1	0	—		5	0
Jarun Zagreb	2025–26	Prva NL	2	1	—		—		—		—		2	1
Araucária	2026	Paranaense 2ª Divisão	—		10	0	—		—		—		10	0
São José-SP	2026	Paulista A2	—		—		—		—		0	0	0	0
Career total			6	1	12	0	0	0	1	0	10	1	29	2

== Honours ==
Petrocub Hîncești

- Moldovan Super Liga: 2023–24
- Cupa Moldovei: 2023–24

São José-SP

- Copa Paulista: 2026

São Paulo U17

- Campeonato Paulista Sub-17: 2019
