= Walce (footballer) =

Brazilian footballer

Personal information
- Full name: Walce da Silva Costa Filho
- Date of birth: 2 February 1999 (age 27)
- Place of birth: Cuiabá, Brazil
- Height: 1.88 m (6 ft 2 in)
- Position: Centre-back

Team information
- Current team: Ypiranga
- Number: 22

Youth career
- 2011–2019: São Paulo

Senior career*
| Years | Team | Apps | (Gls) |
| 2019–2023 | São Paulo | 6 | (0) |
| 2023 | → Juventude (loan) | 8 | (1) |
| 2024 | Santo André | 6 | (0) |
| 2025 | Retrô | 9 | (1) |
| 2026– | Ypiranga | 23 | (0) |

International career^{‡}
| 2017–2019 | Brazil U20 | 11 | (0) |
| 2019–2020 | Brazil U23 | 2 | (0) |
- * Club domestic league appearances and goals as of 10 November 2026 ‡ National team caps and goals as of 17 June 2019

Walce da Silva Costa Filho (born 2 February 1999), commonly known as Walce, is a Brazilian professional footballer who plays for Ypiranga as a centre-back.

== Career statistics ==
=== Club ===
As of 17 June 2019.

| Club | Season | League | | | State League | | Cup | | Continental | | Other | | Total | |
| Club | Season | Division | Apps | Goals | Apps | Goals | Apps | Goals | Apps | Goals | Apps | Goals | Apps | Goals |
|---|---|---|---|---|---|---|---|---|---|---|---|---|---|---|
| São Paulo | 2019 | Série A | 3 | 0 | 0 | 0 | 1 (Note: Appearances in the Copa do Brasil) | 0 | 0 | 0 | 0 | 0 | 4 | 0 |
| Career total | | | 3 | 0 | 0 | 0 | 1 | 0 | 0 | 0 | 0 | 0 | 4 | 0 |
