= Wellington Rato =

Brazilian footballer (born 1992)

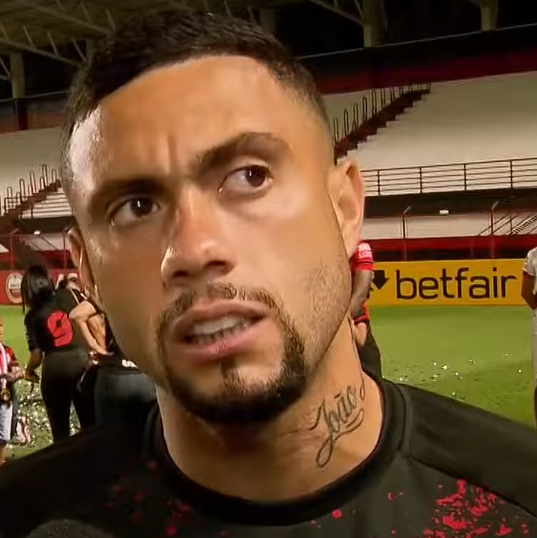
- Wellington Rato in 2022

Personal information
- Full name: Wellington Soares da Silva
- Date of birth: 28 June 1992 (age 34)
- Place of birth: Japeri, Brazil
- Height: 1.72 m (5 ft 8 in)
- Position: Attacking midfielder

Team information
- Current team: Goiás (on loan from Vitória)
- Number: 27

Youth career
- Audax

Senior career*
Years	Team	Apps	(Gls)
2012–2014	Audax Rio	22	(2)
2014	→ Guaratinguetá (loan)	5	(0)
2014–2015	Dom Bosco	12	(1)
2015–2016	Red Bull Brasil	20	(1)
2016–2017	Caldense	15	(4)
2017–2018	Sampaio Corrêa	34	(1)
2018–2019	Joinville	13	(0)
2019–2020	Ferroviário	22	(7)
2020–2022	Atlético Goianiense	100	(21)
2021–2022	→ V-Varen Nagasaki (loan)	23	(7)
2023–2024	São Paulo	45	(2)
2025–	Vitória	14	(2)
2025–	→ Goiás (loan)	31	(2)
- * Club domestic league appearances and goals as of 16 November 2026

Wellington Soares da Silva (born 18 June 1992), known as Wellington Rato, is a Brazilian footballer who plays as an attacking midfielder for Goiás Esporte Clube.

== Club career ==
Wellington Rato was born in Japeri, Rio de Janeiro, and finished his formation with Audax. He made his senior debut with affiliate side Audax Rio in the 2012 Copa Rio, scoring eight goals for his side.

After leaving the club in December 2014, Wellington Rato subsequently represented Dom Bosco, Red Bull Brasil and Caldense before joining Sampaio Corrêa in the Série C in July 2017. He helped the side achieve promotion to the Série B in his first season, but subsequently started to feature sparingly.

On 18 December 2018, Wellington Rato was presented at Série D's Joinville, Roughty one year later, he moved to Ferroviário in the third division, where he became a regular starter.

On 27 September 2020, Wellington Rato agreed to a contract with Atlético Goianiense of the Série A. He made his top tier debut on 8 October, coming on as a second-half substitute for Chico in a 0–3 away loss against São Paulo.

On 2 January 2025, Rato was announced as a reinforcement for EC Vitória.

== Career statistics ==
As of 6 November 2020.

Club	Season	League			State League		Cup		Continental		Other		Total	
Club	Season	Division	Apps	Goals	Apps	Goals	Apps	Goals	Apps	Goals	Apps	Goals	Apps	Goals
Audax Rio	2012	Carioca Série B	—		0	0	—		—		13 (Note: Appearance(s) in Copa Rio)	8	13	8
Audax Rio	2013	Carioca	—		10	1	—		—		—		10	1
Audax Rio	2014	Carioca	—		12	1	—		—		—		12	1
Audax Rio	Total		—		22	2	—		—		13	8	35	10
Guaratinguetá (loan)	2014	Série C	5	0	—		—		—		—		5	0
Dom Bosco	2015	Mato-Grossense	—		12	1	—		—		—		12	1
Red Bull Brasil	2015	Série D	7	1	—		—		—		—		7	1
Red Bull Brasil	2016	Paulista	—		0	0	—		—		15 (Note: Appearance(s) in Copa Paulista)	0	15	0
Red Bull Brasil	Total		7	1	0	0	—		—		15	0	22	1
Caldense	2017	Série D	6	2	9	2	—		—		—		15	4
Sampaio Corrêa	2017	Série C	9	0	—		—		—		—		9	0
Sampaio Corrêa	2018	Série B	9	0	7	0	2	0	—		7 (Note: Appearance(s) in Copa do Nordeste)	1	25	1
Sampaio Corrêa	Total		18	0	7	0	2	0	—		7	1	34	1
Joinville	2019	Série D	4	0	9	0	—		—		—		13	0
Ferroviário	2020	Série C	7	4	15	3	—		—		—		22	7
Atlético Goianiense	2020	Série A	2	0	—		2	0	—		—		4	0
Career total			49	7	74	8	4	0	0	0	35	9	162	24

== Honours ==
Sampaio Corrêa

- Copa do Nordeste: 2018

Atlético Goianiense

- Campeonato Goiano: 2022

São Paulo

- Copa do Brasil: 2023
- Supercopa do Brasil: 2024

Goiás

- Campeonato Goiano: 2026
