= Juninho Capixaba =

Brazilian footballer

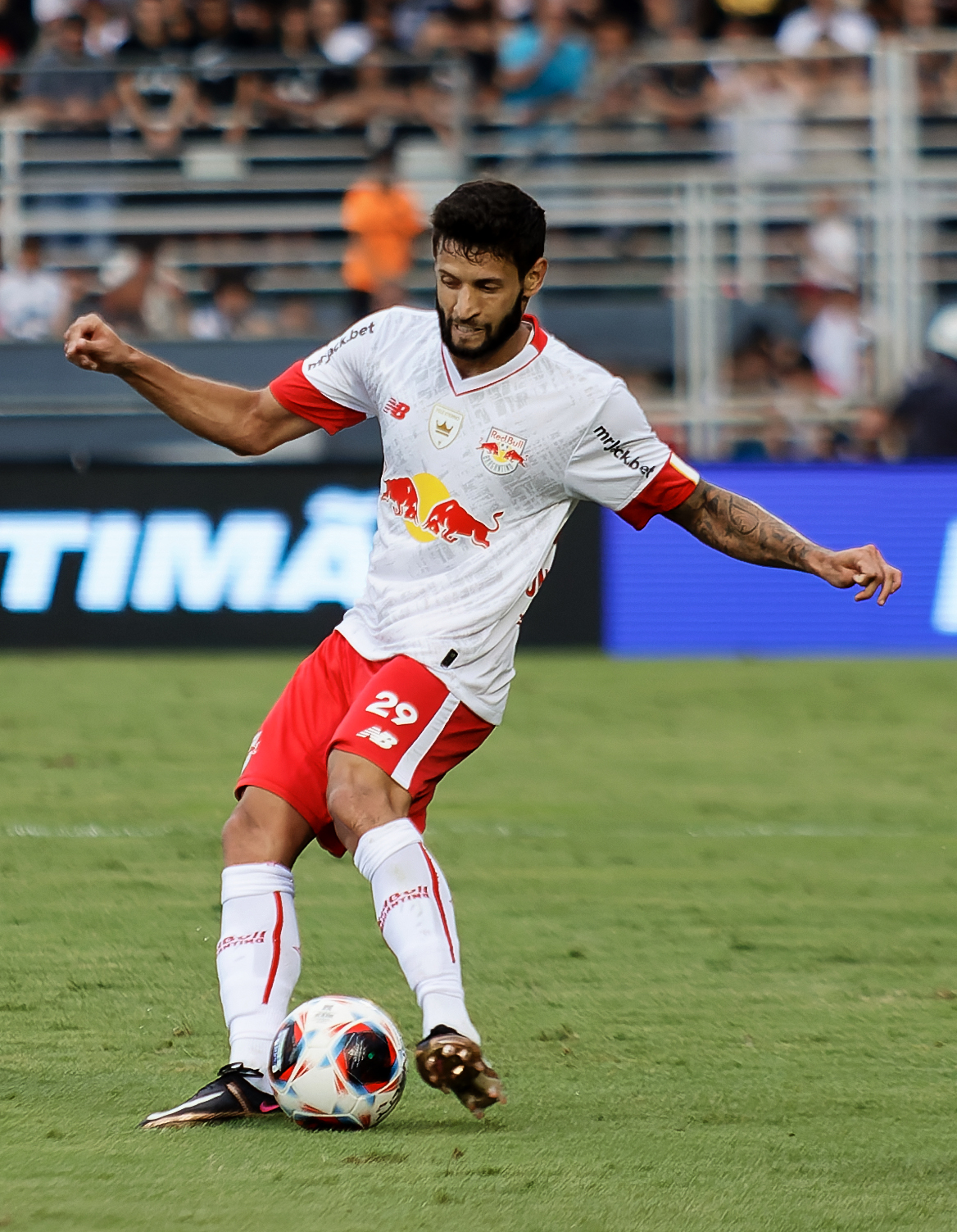
- Juninho Capixaba with Red Bull Bragantino in 2023

Personal information
- Full name: Luis Antônio da Rocha Júnior
- Date of birth: 6 July 1997 (age 29)
- Place of birth: Cachoeiro de Itapemirim, Brazil
- Height: 1.76 m (5 ft 9 in)
- Position: Left back

Team information
- Current team: Red Bull Bragantino
- Number: 29

Youth career
- 2015–2016: Bahia

Senior career*
Years	Team	Apps	(Gls)
2015–2017	Bahia	26	(0)
2018–2019	Corinthians	9	(0)
2018–2019	→ Grêmio (loan)	16	(5)
2019–2022	Grêmio	15	(0)
2020–2021	→ Bahia (loan)	56	(0)
2022	→ Fortaleza (loan)	34	(3)
2023–	Red Bull Bragantino	132	(9)
- * Club domestic league appearances and goals as of 7 April 2026

Luis Antônio da Rocha Júnior (born 6 July 1997), known as Juninho Capixaba, is a Brazilian footballer who plays as a left back for Red Bull Bragantino.

== Club career ==
=== Bahia ===
Born in Cachoeiro de Itapemirim, Espírito Santo, Juninho finished his formation with Bahia. He made his first team debut on 7 November 2015, starting in a 2–1 home loss against Santa Cruz for the Série B championship.

Juninho did not feature in any league matches during the 2016 campaign, which ended in promotion, and mainly appeared for the under-20 squad. Ahead of the 2017 season, he faced competition with new signings Matheus Reis and Pablo Armero, starting the year as a third-choice.

Juninho made his Série A debut on 6 August 2017, coming on as a second-half substitute for Armero in a 2–1 home win against São Paulo. He finished the tournament with 17 appearances, being an undisputed starter during the final stages.

=== Corinthians ===
On 5 January 2018, Juninho signed a four-year contract with Corinthians, mainly as a replacement to Sevilla-bound Guilherme Arana.

=== Grêmio ===
Juninho was loaned out to Grêmio in July 2018 for a fee of 1.3 millioner euros. On 16 May 2019, the deal was turned permanent.

== Honours ==
=== Club ===
Bahia

- Copa do Nordeste: 2017
- Campeonato Baiano: 2020

Corinthians

- Campeonato Paulista: 2018

Fortaleza

- Copa do Nordeste: 2022
- Campeonato Cearense: 2022

=== Individual ===
- Campeonato Paulista Team of the year: 2023, 2024
