= Rafael (footballer, born 1989) =

Brazilian footballer

Personal information
- Full name: Rafael Pires Monteiro
- Date of birth: 23 June 1989 (age 37)
- Place of birth: Coronel Fabriciano, Brazil
- Height: 1.90 m (6 ft 3 in)
- Position: Goalkeeper

Team information
- Current team: São Paulo
- Number: 23

Youth career
- 2002–2008: Cruzeiro

Senior career*
Years	Team	Apps	(Gls)
2008–2020	Cruzeiro	76	(0)
2020–2022	Atlético Mineiro	29	(0)
2023–	São Paulo	156	(0)

International career
2009	Brazil U20	14	(0)
- * Club domestic league appearances and goals as of 20:33, 20 July 2026 (UTC)

Rafael Pires Monteiro (born 23 June 1989), known simply as Rafael, is a Brazilian footballer who plays as a goalkeeper for Campeonato Brasileiro Série A club São Paulo.

== Club career ==
=== Cruzeiro ===
Rafael joined the youth ranks of Cruzeiro in 2002 and received his first call up to the first team squad six years later. He made his professional debut on 30 January 2010, in a Campeonato Mineiro 3–0 defeat to Ipatinga. On 4 December 2011, he was in the starting lineup in one of Cruzeiro's most famed Clássico Mineiro wins, in which they beat rivals Atlético Mineiro 6–1 in the last round of that year's Campeonato Brasileiro Série A and avoided relegation.

During Cruzeiro's 2016 Campeonato Brasileiro Série A campaign, Rafael served as the main goalkeeper, while the first choice and club captain Fábio recovered from a long-term injury. During the first months of 2017, he and Fábio battled for the spot, with Rafael starting in most of the 2017 Campeonato Mineiro matches.

=== Atlético Mineiro ===
On 3 March 2020, Rafael joined Atlético Mineiro on a three-year deal.

=== São Paulo ===
On 8 December 2022, Rafael signed a three-year deal with São Paulo.

== International career ==
On 19 May 2024, Rafael was called up for the Brazil national team to participate the 2024 Copa América as a replacement for Ederson due to injury.

== Career statistics ==
As of 31 May 2024

Club	Season	League			Cup		Continental		State League		Other		Total	
Club	Season	Division	Apps	Goals	Apps	Goals	Apps	Goals	Apps	Goals	Apps	Goals	Apps	Goals
Cruzeiro	2010	Série A	2	0	0	0	0	0	3	0	—		5	0
Cruzeiro	2011	Série A	6	0	0	0	0	0	1	0	—		7	0
Cruzeiro	2012	Série A	1	0	0	0	—		1	0	—		2	0
Cruzeiro	2013	Série A	2	0	0	0	—		2	0	—		4	0
Cruzeiro	2014	Série A	1	0	0	0	0	0	0	0	—		1	0
Cruzeiro	2015	Série A	2	0	0	0	0	0	2	0	—		4	0
Cruzeiro	2016	Série A	17	0	6	0	—		1	0	1 (Note: Appearance(s) in Primeira Liga)	0	25	0
Cruzeiro	2017	Série A	6	0	7	0	2 (Note: Appearance(s) in Copa Sudamericana)	0	14	0	4	0	33	0
Cruzeiro	2018	Série A	8	0	0	0	1 (Note: Appearance(s) in Copa Libertadores)	0	3	0	—		12	0
Cruzeiro	2019	Série A	3	0	0	0	0	0	1	0	—		4	0
Cruzeiro	Total		48	0	13	0	3	0	28	0	5	0	97	0
Atlético Mineiro	2020	Série A	10	0	—		—		7	0	—		17	0
Atlético Mineiro	2021	Série A	1	0	0	0	0	0	4	0	—		5	0
Atlético Mineiro	2022	Série A	1	0	1	0	1	0	6	0	—		9	0
Atlético Mineiro	Total		12	0	1	0	1	0	17	0	0	0	31	0
São Paulo	2023	Série A	33	0	10	0	10	0	13	0	—		66	0
São Paulo	2024	Série A	14	0	2	0	8	0	11	0	1 (Note: Appearances in Supercopa do Brasil)	0	36	0
São Paulo	Total		47	0	12	0	18	0	24	0	1	0	102	0
Career total			107	0	26	0	22	0	72	0	6	0	230	0

== Honours ==
=== Clubs ===
Cruzeiro

- Campeonato Brasileiro Série A: 2013, 2014
- Copa do Brasil: 2017, 2018
- Campeonato Mineiro: 2009, 2011, 2014, 2018, 2019
- Copa São Paulo de Futebol Jr.: 2007

Atlético Mineiro

- Campeonato Brasileiro Série A: 2021
- Copa do Brasil: 2021
- Campeonato Mineiro: 2020, 2021, 2022
- Supercopa do Brasil: 2022

São Paulo

- Copa do Brasil: 2023
- Supercopa do Brasil: 2024

=== International ===
Brazil U20

- South American Youth Championship: 2009

=== Individual ===
- 2024 Supercopa do Brasil Man of the Match
