= Pablo Maia =

Brazilian footballer

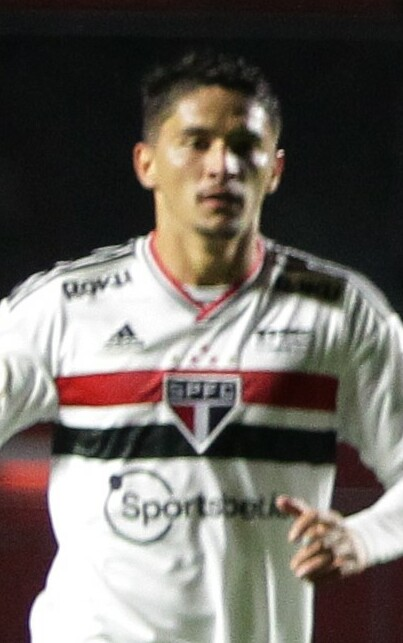
- Pablo Maia in 2022

Personal information
- Full name: Pablo Gonçalves Maia Fortunato
- Date of birth: 10 January 2002 (age 24)
- Place of birth: Brasópolis, Brazil
- Height: 1.78 m (5 ft 10 in)
- Position: Defensive midfielder

Team information
- Current team: São Paulo
- Number: 29

Youth career
- 2013–2016: Independente de Limeira
- 2016–2017: Portuguesa Santista
- 2017–2022: São Paulo

Senior career*
Years	Team	Apps	(Gls)
2022–	São Paulo	148	(8)

International career^{‡}
2024–	Brazil	1	(0)
- * Club domestic league appearances and goals as of 6 April 2026 ‡ National team caps and goals as of 21:02, 23 March 2024 (UTC)

Pablo Gonçalves Maia Fortunato (born 10 January 2002) is a Brazilian professional footballer who plays as a defensive midfielder for Campeonato Brasileiro Série A club São Paulo and the Brazil national team.

== International career ==
Maia made his debut for the senior Brazil national team on 23 March 2024 in a friendly against England.

== Career statistics ==
=== Club ===
As of 22 March 2022

Club	Season	League			State league		Cup		Continental		Other		Total	
Club	Season	Division	Apps	Goals	Apps	Goals	Apps	Goals	Apps	Goals	Apps	Goals	Apps	Goals
São Paulo	2022	Série A	0	0	9 (Note: Appearances in Campeonato Paulista)	1	2	0	—		0	0	11	1
Career total			0	0	9	1	2	0	0	0	0	0	11	1

=== International ===
As of match played 23 March 2024

Appearances and goals by national team and year
National team	Year	Apps	Goals
Brazil	2024	1	0
Total		1	0

== Honours ==
São Paulo

- Copa do Brasil: 2023
- Supercopa do Brasil: 2024
