= Caio Paulista =

Brazilian footballer (born 1998)

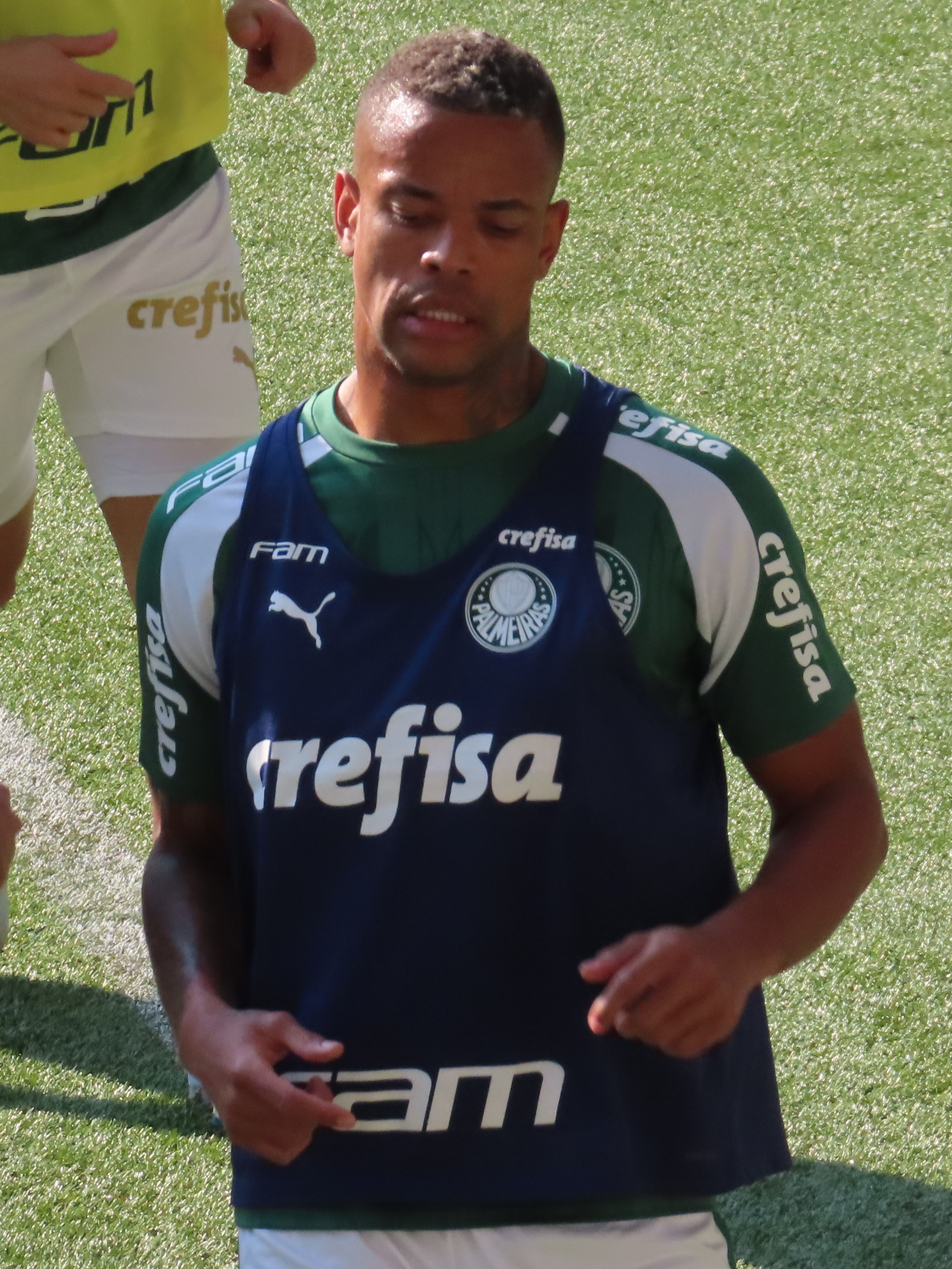
- Caio Paulista in 2024

Personal information
- Full name: Caio Fernando de Oliveira
- Date of birth: 11 May 1998 (age 28)
- Place of birth: São Paulo, Brazil
- Height: 1.83 m (6 ft 0 in)
- Positions: Left-back; winger

Team information
- Current team: Grêmio (on loan from Palmeiras)
- Number: 38

Youth career
- 2015: Ceará
- 2015–2017: Fluminense
- 2017–2018: Tombense
- 2017–2018: → Avaí (loan)

Senior career*
| Years | Team | Apps | (Gls) |
| 2017–2021 | Tombense | 0 | (0) |
| 2017–2019 | → Avaí (loan) | 36 | (0) |
| 2020–2021 | → Fluminense (loan) | 39 | (5) |
| 2021–2023 | Fluminense | 62 | (1) |
| 2023 | → São Paulo (loan) | 37 | (2) |
| 2024– | Palmeiras | 36 | (0) |
| 2025 | → Atlético Mineiro (loan) | 22 | (0) |
| 2026– | → Grêmio (loan) | 9 | (0) |
- * Club domestic league appearances and goals as of 7 April 2026

Caio Fernando de Oliveira (born 11 May 1998), known as Caio Paulista, is a Brazilian footballer who plays as a left-back or winger for Campeonato Brasileiro Série A club Grêmio, on loan from Palmeiras.

== Club career ==
=== Avaí ===
Born in São Paulo, Caio represented Ceará before joining Avaí's youth categories in 2017. He made his senior debut on 8 March 2018, coming on as a second-half substitute in a 1–0 Campeonato Catarinense away loss against Hercílio Luz; he only featured in one further match during the campaign, as his side achieved promotion to the Série A.

Promoted to the main squad ahead of the 2019 season, Caio made his top tier debut on 19 May of that year by starting in a 1–1 draw at Vasco da Gama.

=== Fluminense ===
On 8 January 2020, still owned by Tombense, Caio moved to Fluminense on loan until the end of the year. He scored his first professional goal on 14 October 2020, netting the opener in a 1–1 away draw against Atlético Mineiro. He subsequently featured regularly for the side, and had his loan extended until the end of 2021 on 2 March of that year.

On 9 September 2021, Caio signed a permanent five-year contract with Flu. During the 2022 season, he was used as a left-back by head coach Fernando Diniz.

==== Loan to São Paulo ====
On 27 January 2023, Caio was announced at São Paulo on loan for the season. A regular starter in the left-back for the season, he helped the club to win their first-ever Copa do Brasil title.

On 10 December 2023, São Paulo notified Fluminense for a permanent transfer of Caio, agreeing to a R$ 17 million fee. However, after disagreements between the club and the athlete's rights representative, Alexandre Uram, the deal ended up not being completed.

=== Palmeiras ===
On 5 January 2024, Caio signed a five-year contract with Série A reigning champions Palmeiras, for a reported transfer fee of €3.8 million.

==== Loan to Atlético Mineiro ====
On 14 February 2025, Caio joined Atlético Mineiro on a season-long loan.

== Career statistics ==
As of 25 November 2025

| Club | Season | League | | | State league | | Cup | | Continental | | Other | | Total | |
| Club | Season | Division | Apps | Goals | Apps | Goals | Apps | Goals | Apps | Goals | Apps | Goals | Apps | Goals |
|---|---|---|---|---|---|---|---|---|---|---|---|---|---|---|
| Avaí | 2018 | Série B | 0 | 0 | 2 | 0 | 0 | 0 | — | | — | | 2 | 0 |
| Avaí | 2019 | Série A | 26 | 0 | 8 | 0 | 1 | 0 | — | | — | | 35 | 0 |
| Avaí | Subtotal | | 26 | 0 | 10 | 0 | 1 | 0 | — | | — | | 37 | 0 |
| Fluminense | 2020 | Série A | 22 | 3 | 9 | 0 | 0 | 0 | 1 (Note: Appearance(s) in Copa Sudamericana) | 0 | — | | 32 | 3 |
| Fluminense | 2021 | Série A | 27 | 2 | 9 | 0 | 3 | 0 | 6 (Note: Appearance(s) in Copa Libertadores) | 2 | — | | 45 | 4 |
| Fluminense | 2022 | Série A | 27 | 1 | 6 | 0 | 8 | 0 | 3 | 1 | — | | 44 | 2 |
| Fluminense | 2023 | Série A | 0 | 0 | 1 | 0 | 0 | 0 | 0 | 0 | — | | 1 | 0 |
| Fluminense | Subtotal | | 76 | 6 | 25 | 0 | 11 | 0 | 10 | 3 | — | | 122 | 9 |
| São Paulo (loan) | 2023 | Série A | 28 | 1 | 9 | 1 | 7 | 1 | 6 | 2 | — | | 50 | 5 |
| Palmeiras | 2024 | Série A | 24 | 0 | 10 | 0 | 3 | 0 | 2 | 0 | 0 | 0 | 39 | 0 |
| Palmeiras | 2025 | Série A | — | | 2 | 0 | — | | — | | — | | 2 | 0 |
| Palmeiras | Subtotal | | 24 | 0 | 12 | 0 | 3 | 0 | 2 | 0 | 0 | 0 | 41 | 0 |
| Atlético Mineiro (loan) | 2025 | Série A | 20 | 0 | 2 | 0 | 4 | 0 | 10 | 0 | — | | 36 | 0 |
| Career total | | | 174 | 7 | 58 | 1 | 26 | 1 | 28 | 5 | 0 | 0 | 286 | 14 |

== Honours ==
Avaí

- Campeonato Catarinense: 2019

Fluminense

- Campeonato Carioca: 2022, 2023

São Paulo

- Copa do Brasil: 2023

Palmeiras

- Campeonato Paulista: 2024

Atlético Mineiro

- Campeonato Mineiro: 2025

Grêmio

- Campeonato Gaúcho: 2026
