= Alan Franco (footballer, born 1996) =

Argentine footballer (born 1996)

Personal information
- Full name: Alan Javier Franco
- Date of birth: 11 October 1996 (age 30)
- Place of birth: Avellaneda, Argentina
- Height: 1.76 m (5 ft 9 in)
- Position: Centre-back

Team information
- Current team: Tigres UANL (on loan from São Paulo)
- Number: 15

Youth career
- 2011–2014: San Telmo
- 2015–2016: Independiente

Senior career*
Years	Team	Apps	(Gls)
2017–2021	Independiente	83	(0)
2021–2022	Atlanta United	56	(1)
2023–	São Paulo	109	(3)
2026–	→ Tigres UANL (loan)	0	(0)

International career
2018	Argentina	1	(0)
- * Club domestic league appearances and goals as of 6 April 2026

Alan Javier Franco (born 11 October 1996) is an Argentine professional footballer who plays as a centre-back for Liga MX club Tigres UANL, on loan from Campeonato Brasileiro Série A club São Paulo.

== Club career ==
=== Independiente ===
Born in Avellaneda, Franco joined Independiente in January 2015, from San Telmo. On 20 December 2016, he signed his first professional contract with the club, agreeing to a deal until 2020, and was promoted to the main squad shortly after.

Franco made his first team – and Primera División – debut on 18 March 2017, starting in a 0–0 home draw against San Martín de San Juan. He scored his first professional goal on 12 July, netting the first in a 4–2 Copa Sudamericana home defeat of Deportes Iquique.

Franco became a starter under Ariel Holan during the 2017 Copa Sudamericana, featuring in both legs of the Final against Flamengo.

=== Atlanta United ===
On 8 April 2021, Franco joined Major League Soccer side Atlanta United on a five-year contract as a designated player. He made his debut for the club on 27 April 2021 in the CONCACAF Champions League against the Philadelphia Union, the club losing 3–0.

=== São Paulo ===
On 5 January 2023, Franco joined Brazilian side São Paulo on a permanent deal, signing a three-year contract, with an option for another year.

=== Tigres UANL ===
On 13 July 2026, Franco joins Liga MX club Tigres UANL on loan until 1 July 2027.

== International career ==
Franco made his international debut for Argentina on September 8, 2018, in a 3-0 international friendly against the Guatemala national football team.

== Career statistics ==
=== Club ===
As of match played on 8 December 2024

Appearances and goals by club, season and competition
Club	Season	League			State league		National cup (Note: Includes Copa Argentina, U.S. Open Cup, Copa do Brasil)		League cup (Note: Includes Copa de la Superliga)		Continental		Other		Total	
Club	Season	Division	Apps	Goals	Apps	Goals	Apps	Goals	Apps	Goals	Apps	Goals	Apps	Goals	Apps	Goals
Independiente	2016-17	Primera División	14	0	—		0	0	—		5 (Note: Appearance(s) in Copa Sudamericana)	1	2 (Note: Appearance(s) in Torneos de Verano)	0	21	1
Independiente	2017-18	Primera División	20	0	—		1	0	—		14 (Note: Seven appearances in Copa Sudamericana, Two appearances in Recopa Sudamericanax, Five appearances in Copa Libertadores)	0	2 (Note: One appearance in Torneos de Verano, One appearance in J.League Cup / Copa Sudamericana Championship)	0	37	0
Independiente	2018-19	Primera División	17	0	—		2	0	2	0	5 (Note: Three appearances in Copa Libertadores, Two appearances in Copa Sudamericana)	0	1	0	27	0
Independiente	2019-20	Primera División	18	0	—		3	0	1	0	5	0	—		27	0
Independiente	2020-21	Primera División	8	0	—		0	0	—		5	0	—		13	0
Independiente	2021	Primera División	6	0	—		1	0	—		0	0	—		7	0
Independiente	Total		83	0	—		7	0	3	0	34	1	5	0	132	1
Atlanta United	2021	MLS	25	0	—		—		—		1 (Note: Appearance(s) in CONCACAF Champions Cup)	0	1 (Note: Appearance(s) in MLS Cup playoffs)	0	27	0
Atlanta United	2022	MLS	31	1	—		1	0	—		—		—		32	1
Atlanta United	Total		56	1	—		1	0	—		1	0	1	0	59	1
São Paulo	2023	Série A	13	1	11 (Note: Appearance(s) in Campeonato Paulista)	1	3	0	—		5	0	—		32	2
São Paulo	2024	Série A	27	0	6	1	3	0	—		8 (Note: Appearance(s) in Copa Libertadores)	0	0	0	44	1
São Paulo	Total		40	1	17	2	6	0	—		13	0	0	0	76	3
Career total			179	2	17	2	14	0	3	0	48	1	6	0	267	5

=== International ===
Appearances and goals by national team and year
National team	Year	Apps	Goals
Argentina	2018	1	0
Total		1	0

== Honours ==
Independiente

- Copa Sudamericana: 2017

São Paulo

- Copa do Brasil: 2023
- Supercopa do Brasil: 2024

Individual

- Troféu Mesa Redonda Team of the Year: 2024
