= 2022 São Paulo FC season =

São Paulo
2022 season
- Chairman: Julio Casares
- Manager: Rogério Ceni
- Stadium: Morumbi
- Campeonato Brasileiro Série A: 9th
- Campeonato Paulista: Runners-up
- Copa do Brasil: Semi-finals
- Copa Sudamericana: Runners-up
- Top goalscorer: League: Jonathan Calleri (18 goals); All: Jonathan Calleri (27 goals)
- Highest home attendance: 60,383 (vs. Palmeiras, 30 March)
- Lowest home attendance: 14.806 (vs. Juventude, 12 May, at Arena Barueri)
Home colours	Away colours	Third colours

The 2022 season was São Paulo's 93rd season in the club's history and their 62nd in the top-flight of Brazilian football. Along with Série A, São Paulo competed in the Campeonato Paulista, Copa do Brasil and Copa Sudamericana.

== First-team squad ==
As of 13 November 2022

Note: Flags indicate national team as defined under FIFA eligibility rules; some limited exceptions apply. Players may hold more than one non-FIFA nationality.

No.	Pos.	Nation	Player
1	GK	BRA	Felipe Alves (on loan from Fortaleza)
2	DF	BRA	Igor Vinícius
3 / 88	MF	BRA	Patrick
4	DF	BRA	Diego Costa (captain)
5	DF	ECU	Robert Arboleda
6	DF	BRA	Reinaldo
7	MF	BRA	Alisson
8	MF	BRA	Luan
9	FW	ARG	Jonathan Calleri
10	MF	BRA	Nikão
11	FW	BRA	Luciano
13	DF	BRA	Rafinha
14 / 21	MF	ARG	Giuliano Galoppo
15	MF	URU	Gabriel Neves (on loan from Nacional)
16	DF	BRA	Léo
17 / 28	MF	ITA	André Anderson (on loan from Lazio)
19	FW	ARG	Nahuel Bustos (on loan from Manchester City)

No.	Pos.	Nation	Player
19 / 93	GK	BRA	Jandrei
20	MF	COL	Andrés Colorado (on loan from Cortuluá)
22	DF	BRA	Miranda (vice-captain)
23	FW	ITA	Éder
25	MF	BRA	Rodrigo Nestor
26	MF	BRA	Igor Gomes
29	MF	BRA	Pablo Maia
30	DF	POR	João Moreira
31	FW	BRA	Juan
32	DF	BRA	Luizão
33	FW	BRA	Caio
34	DF	BRA	Welington
37	MF	BRA	Talles Costa
40	GK	BRA	Thiago Couto
44	DF	VEN	Nahuel Ferraresi (on loan from Manchester City)
95	FW	BRA	Marcos Guilherme

=== Youth players with first team numbers ===
As of 17 July 2022

Note: Flags indicate national team as defined under FIFA eligibility rules; some limited exceptions apply. Players may hold more than one non-FIFA nationality.

No.	Pos.	Nation	Player
35	DF	BRA	Lucas Beraldo
36	DF	BRA	Mateus Petri
38	MF	BRA	Léo Silva
39	FW	BRA	Gabriel Maioli
41	GK	BRA	Rokenedy
42	MF	BRA	Luizinho

No.	Pos.	Nation	Player
43	MF	BRA	Palmberg
46	DF	BRA	Patryck Lanza
47	MF	BRA	Rodriguinho
48	GK	BRA	Leandro Mathias
50 / 87	GK	BRA	Young

=== Other players under contract ===
Note: Flags indicate national team as defined under FIFA eligibility rules; some limited exceptions apply. Players may hold more than one non-FIFA nationality.

No.	Pos.	Nation	Player
—	DF	BRA	Walce
—	MF	BRA	Gabriel Falcão
—	MF	BRA	Rafael Silva

=== Out on loan ===
Note: Flags indicate national team as defined under FIFA eligibility rules; some limited exceptions apply. Players may hold more than one non-FIFA nationality.

No.	Pos.	Nation	Player
—	DF	BRA	Anílson (at Náutico until 8 April 2023)
—	DF	BRA	Bruno Alves (at Grêmio until 30 June 2023)
—	DF	BRA	Gabriel Rodrigues (at Ituano until 25 January 2023)
—	DF	COL	Luis Manuel Orejuela (at Athletico Paranaense until 31 December 2022)
—	DF	BRA	Nathan (at Coritiba until 31 March 2023)

No.	Pos.	Nation	Player
—	DF	BRA	Pedro Lucas (at Vasco da Gama until 31 January 2023)
—	MF	BRA	Bruno Tatavitto (at Confiança until 31 December 2022)
—	MF	BRA	Danilo Gomes (at Ponte Preta until 31 December 2022)
—	MF	BRA	Liziero (at Internacional until 31 December 2022)

=== Retired numbers ===
- 01 – (Brazil) Rogério Ceni, Goalkeeper (1990–2015)

== Transfers ==
=== Transfers in ===
Entry date	Position	No.	Player	From club	Fee	Ref.
20 December 2021	DF	13	(Brazil) Rafinha	(Brazil) Grêmio	Free transfer	
24 December 2021	GK	93	(Brazil) Jandrei	(Brazil) Santos	Free transfer	
24 December 2021	MF	7	(Brazil) Alisson	(Brazil) Grêmio	Free transfer	
31 December 2021	FW	44	(Brazil) Jonas Toró	(Brazil) Atlético Goianiense	End of loan	
8 January 2022	MF	88	(Brazil) Patrick	(Brazil) Internacional	R$6,3M	
10 January 2022	MF	10	(Brazil) Nikão	(Brazil) Athletico Paranaense	Free transfer	
28 June 2022	FW	95	(Brazil) Marcos Guilherme	(Brazil) Internacional	Free transfer	
25 July 2022	FW	9	(Argentina) Jonathan Calleri	(Uruguay) Deportivo Maldonado	R$16,3M	
26 July 2022	MF	14	(Argentina) Giuliano Galoppo	(Argentina) Banfield	R$32,6M	
19 October 2022	MF	–	(Brazil) Gabriel Falcão	(Brazil) Cuiabá	End of loan	

=== Loans in ===
Entry date	Position	No.	Player	From club	Fee	Ref.
22 February 2022	MF	20	(Colombia) Andrés Colorado	(Colombia) Cortuluá	R$3,0M	
11 April 2022	MF	28	(Italy) André Anderson	(Italy) Lazio	Free transfer	
29 July 2022	GK	1	(Brazil) Felipe Alves	(Brazil) Fortaleza	R$1,0M	
5 August 2022	FW	19	(Argentina) Nahuel Bustos	(England) Manchester City	Free transfer	
13 August 2022	DF	44	(Venezuela) Nahuel Ferraresi	(England) Manchester City	Free transfer	

=== Transfers out ===
Entry date	Position	No.	Player	To club	Fee	Ref.
31 December 2021	GK	–	(Brazil) Dênis Júnior	(Brazil) Bahia	Free transfer	
31 December 2021	FW	–	(Colombia) Santiago Tréllez	(Brazil) Vitória	End of contract	
31 December 2021	DF	32	(Brazil) Rodrigo Freitas	(Brazil) Avaí	End of contract	
31 December 2021	MF	–	(Brazil) William	(Brazil) CSA	End of contract	
31 December 2021	MF	–	(Argentina) Martín Benítez	(Argentina) Independiente	End of loan	
31 December 2021	FW	–	(Paraguay) Antonio Galeano	(Paraguay) Rubio Ñu	End of loan	
1 January 2022	FW	–	(Brazil) Paulinho Bóia	(Ukraine) Metalist	R$7,0M	
1 January 2022	FW	11	(Brazil) Helinho	(Brazil) Red Bull Bragantino	R$24,0M	
7 January 2022	DF	21	(Brazil) Lucas Kal	(Brazil) América Mineiro	Free transfer	
8 January 2022	MF	–	(Brazil) Marcos Júnior	(Brazil) Ponte Preta	Free transfer	
11 January 2022	GK	13	(Brazil) Jean	(Paraguay) Cerro Porteño	R$6,2M	
19 January 2022	MF	10	(Brazil) Shaylon	(Brazil) Atlético Goianiense	Contract terminated by mutual consent	
26 January 2022	MF	8	(Brazil) Vitor Bueno	(Brazil) Athletico Paranaense	Contract terminated by mutual consent	
28 January 2022	FW	92	(Brazil) Pablo	(Brazil) Athletico Paranaense	Contract terminated by mutual consent	
31 January 2022	MF	–	(Brazil) Hudson	Retired	End of contract	
12 April 2022	MF	6	(Brazil) Tchê Tchê	(Brazil) Botafogo	R$5,0M	
13 May 2022	FW	27	(Brazil) Marquinhos	(England) Arsenal	R$18,4M	
13 May 2022	GK	1	(Brazil) Tiago Volpi	(Mexico) Toluca	R$7,5M	
28 May 2022	FW	12	(Brazil) Vitinho	(Mexico) Atlético de San Luis	End of contract	
15 July 2022	MF	17	(Brazil) Gabriel Sara	(England) Norwich City	R$57,6M	
17 July 2022	FW	–	(Uruguay) Facundo Milán	(Uruguay) Montevideo Wanderers	Free transfer	
26 July 2022	FW	–	(Argentina) Emiliano Rigoni	(United States) Austin FC	R$20,3M	
27 July 2022	FW	–	(Brazil) Jonas Toró	(Greece) Panathinaikos	R$8,0M	
15 August 2022	GK	–	(Brazil) Lucas Perri	(Brazil) Botafogo	Free transfer	

=== Loans out ===
Entry date	Position	No.	Player	To club	Fee	Ref.
1 January 2022	DF	–	(Colombia) Luis Manuel Orejuela	(Brazil) Grêmio	None	
1 January 2022	GK	–	(Brazil) Lucas Perri	(Brazil) Náutico	None	
1 January 2022	DF	34	(Brazil) Bruno Alves	(Brazil) Grêmio	None	
8 January 2022	MF	5	(Brazil) Liziero	(Brazil) Internacional	None	
7 February 2022	DF	–	(Brazil) Anílson	(Brazil) Aimoré	None	
21 February 2022	DF	–	(Brazil) Pedro Lucas	(Brazil) Vasco da Gama	None	
22 March 2022	DF	24	(Colombia) Luis Manuel Orejuela	(Brazil) Athletico Paranaense	None	
5 April 2022	FW	–	(Brazil) Danilo Gomes	(Brazil) Ponte Preta	None	
11 April 2022	DF	45	(Brazil) Nathan	(Brazil) Coritiba	None	
12 April 2022	MF	–	(Brazil) Gabriel Falcão	(Brazil) Cuiabá	None	
5 May 2022	MF	–	(Brazil) Bruno Tatavitto	(Brazil) Confiança	None	
1 August 2022	DF	–	(Brazil) Anílson	(Brazil) Náutico	None	

== Statistics ==
=== Overall ===
Games played	77 (16 Campeonato Paulista, 10 Copa do Brasil, 13 Copa Sudamericana, 38 Campeonato Brasileiro)
Games won	36 (10 Campeonato Paulista, 4 Copa do Brasil, 9 Copa Sudamericana, 13 Campeonato Brasileiro)
Games drawn	21 (2 Campeonato Paulista, 3 Copa do Brasil, 1 Copa Sudamericana, 15 Campeonato Brasileiro)
Games lost	20 (4 Campeonato Paulista, 3 Copa do Brasil, 3 Copa Sudamericana, 10 Campeonato Brasileiro)
Goals scored	119
Goals conceded	82
Goal difference	+37
Best results (goal difference)	4–0 (H) v Athletico Paranaense - Campeonato Brasileiro - 2022.04.10; 4–0 (H) v Avaí - Campeonato Brasileiro - 2022.09.25; 4–0 (A) v Goiás - Campeonato Brasileiro - 2022.11.13
Worst result (goal difference)	0–4 (A) v Palmeiras - Campeonato Paulista - 2022.04.03
Top scorer	Jonathan Calleri (27 goals)

Source: São Paulo FC

=== Goalscorers ===
Place	Position	Nationality	Number	Name	Campeonato Paulista	Copa Sudamericana	Série A	Copa do Brasil	Total
1	FW	(Argentina)	9	Jonathan Calleri	8	1	18	0	27
2	MF	(Brazil)	11	Luciano	1	5	11	4	21
3	MF	(Brazil)	3/88	Patrick	0	3	5	1	9
4	DF	(Brazil)	6	Reinaldo	2	2	3	1	8
=	MF	(Brazil)	25	Rodrigo Nestor	2	2	3	1	8
5	FW	(Brazil) (Italy)	23	Éder	1	1	3	1	6
6	DF	(Brazil)	2	Igor Vinícius	1	1	1	1	4
=	MF	(Brazil)	10	Nikão	0	1	3	0	4
=	DF	(Ecuador)	5	Robert Arboleda	0	2	0	2	4
7	MF	(Brazil)	7	Alisson	2	0	1	0	3
=	FW	(Brazil)	27	Marquinhos	2	1	0	0	3
8	DF	(Brazil)	4	Diego Costa	0	0	1	1	2
=	MF	(Argentina)	77	Emiliano Rigoni	2	0	0	0	2
=	MF	(Brazil)	29	Pablo Maia	2	0	0	0	2
9	FW	(Brazil)	33	Caio Matheus	0	1	0	0	1
=	MF	(Brazil)	17	Gabriel Sara	1	0	0	0	1
=	MF	(Argentina)	14/21	Giuliano Galoppo	0	0	1	0	1
=	MF	(Brazil)	26	Igor Gomes	0	1	0	0	1
=	DF	(Brazil) (Portugal)	30	João Moreira	0	1	0	0	1
=	MF	(Brazil)	44	Jonas Toró	1	0	0	0	1
=	FW	(Brazil)	31	Juan	0	0	1	0	1
=	MF	(Brazil)	8	Luan	0	0	1	0	1
=	DF	(Brazil)	32	Luizão	0	0	1	0	1
=	MF	(Brazil)	95	Marcos Guilherme	0	0	1	0	1
=	DF	(Brazil)	22	Miranda	0	1	0	0	1
=	FW	(Argentina)	19	Nahuel Bustos	0	0	1	0	1
=	MF	(Brazil)	47	Rodriguinho	0	1	0	0	1
=	MF	(Brazil)	37	Talles Costa	0	1	0	0	1
=	DF	(Brazil)	34	Welington	1	0	0	0	1
				Own goals	1	0	0	0	1
				Total	27	25	55	12	119

=== Managers performance ===
Name	Nationality	From	To	P	W	D	L	GF	GA	Avg%
Rogério Ceni	Brazil	27 January 2022	13 November 2022	76	35	21	20	117	81	55%
Charles Hembert (caretaker)	France	2 May 2022	2 May 2022	1	1	0	0	2	1	100%

== Competitions ==
=== Overview ===
Competition	First match	Last match	Starting round	Final position	Record							
Competition	First match	Last match	Starting round	Final position	Pld	W	D	L	GF	GA	GD	Win %
Série A	10 April 2022	13 November 2022	Matchday 1	9th	38	13	15	10	55	42	+13	34.21
Campeonato Paulista	27 January 2022	3 April 2022	First stage	Runners-up	16	10	2	4	27	17	+10	62.50
Copa do Brasil	24 February 2022	14 September 2022	First round	Semi-finals	10	4	3	3	12	10	+2	40.00
Copa Sudamericana	7 April 2022	1 October 2022	Group stage	Runners-up	13	9	1	3	25	13	+12	69.23
Total					77	36	21	20	119	82	+37	46.75

Source: Competitions

=== Campeonato Paulista ===
Pos	Team	Pld	W	D	L	GF	GA	GD	Pts	Qualification or relegation
1	São Paulo	12	7	2	3	18	10	+8	23	Knockout stage
2	São Bernardo	12	4	4	4	9	10	−1	16	Knockout stage
3	Ferroviária	12	3	5	4	15	17	−2	14	
4	Novorizontino	12	0	3	9	5	19	−14	3	Relegation to Série A2

Source: Soccerway

==== Matches ====
27 January 2022 1	Guarani	2–1	São Paulo	Campinas
21:30 (UTC−3)	Lucão 39'; Diogo Mateus 66'; Derlan (yellow card) 71'; Kozlinski (yellow card) 90+1'	Report	Léo (yellow card) 12'; Calleri 80'	Stadium: Estádio Brinco de Ouro; Attendance: 5,458; Referee: Luiz Flávio de Oliveira

30 January 2022 2	São Paulo	0–0	Ituano	São Paulo
15:00 (UTC−3)	Gabriel Sara (yellow card) 22'; Miranda (yellow card) 29'	Report	Gérson Magrão (penalty missed) 25'; Igor Henrique (yellow card) 30'	Stadium: Morumbi; Attendance: 16,312; Referee: Salim Fende Chaves

3 February 2022 3	Red Bull Bragantino	4–3	São Paulo	Bragança Paulista
21:30 (UTC−3)	Artur 12'; Praxedes (yellow card) 33'; Alerrandro 41'; Hyoran 63'; Gabriel Novaes 87', (yellow card) 88'	Report	Alisson 23'; Igor Vinícius (yellow card) 38', (goal) 47'; Calleri 53'; Tiago Volpi (yellow card) 56'	Stadium: Estádio Nabi Abi Chedid; Attendance: 3,523; Referee: Vinícius Gonçalves Dias Araújo

9 February 2022 5	São Paulo	1–0	Santo André	São Paulo
19:00 (UTC−3)	Nestor (yellow card) 45+3'; Marquinhos 90+1', (yellow card) 90+2'	Report	Gustavo Nescau (yellow card) 13'; Jeferson (yellow card) 83'; Mateus Sabino (yellow card) 88'	Stadium: Morumbi; Attendance: 14,918; Referee: Douglas Marques das Flores

13 February 2022 6	Ponte Preta	1–2	São Paulo	Campinas
18:30 (UTC−3)	Lucca 26' (pen.); Thiago Lopes (yellow card) 62'; Jean Carlos (yellow card) 77'	Report	Diego Costa (yellow card) 80'; Gabriel Sara 87'; Calleri 90+3', (yellow card) 90+3'	Stadium: Estádio Moisés Lucarelli; Attendance: 5,404; Referee: Raphael Claus

17 February 2022 7	São Paulo	0–0	Internacional de Limeira	São Paulo
21:30 (UTC−3)	Éder (yellow card) 90+2'	Report	Tito (yellow card) 60'; Rodolfo Filemon (yellow card) 77'	Stadium: Morumbi; Attendance: 15,098; Referee: Vinícius Gonçalves Dias Araújo

20 February 2022 8	Santos	0–3	São Paulo	Santos
18:30 (UTC−3)	Lucas Pires (yellow card) 53'; Zanocelo (yellow card) 86'	Report	Éder 22', (yellow card) 51'; Diego Costa (yellow card) 43'; Bauermann 66' (o.g.); Nestor 71'	Stadium: Vila Belmiro; Attendance: 9,553; Referee: Edina Alves Batista

28 February 2022 9	Água Santa	1–2	São Paulo	Diadema
15:00 (UTC−3)	Fernandinho (yellow card) 11' (yellow-red card) 67'; Hélder (yellow card) 12' (yellow-red card) 90'; Alex Silva (yellow card) 38', (goal) 44'	Report	Reinaldo 39' (pen.); Pablo Maia (yellow card) 63'; Marquinhos (yellow card) 82'; Luciano (yellow card) 87'; Calleri 89'; Miranda (yellow card) 90+6'	Stadium: Arena Inamar; Attendance: 6,028; Referee: Luiz Flávio de Oliveira

5 March 2022 10	São Paulo	1–0	Corinthians	São Paulo
16:00 (UTC−3)	Calleri 1'; Nestor (yellow card) 43'; Rigoni (yellow card) 83'	Report		Stadium: Morumbi; Attendance: 39,213; Referee: Flávio Rodrigues de Souza

10 March 2022 4	São Paulo	0–1	Palmeiras	São Paulo
20:30 (UTC−3)	Rafinha (yellow card) 43' (yellow-red card) 81'; Arboleda (yellow card) 61'; Luciano (yellow card) 86'	Report	Rony 10'; Zé Rafael (yellow card) 63'; Piquerez (yellow card) 87'	Stadium: Morumbi; Attendance: 46,378; Referee: Douglas Marques das Flores
Note: The match, originally scheduled for 6 February, was postponed to 10 March, due to the participation of Palmeiras in the 2021 FIFA Club World Cup.

13 March 2022 11	Mirassol	0–3	São Paulo	Mirassol
16:00 (UTC−3)	Lucão (yellow card) 68'; Neto Moura (yellow card) 73'	Report	Reinaldo 21' (pen.); Rigoni 74'; Toró 81'; Nestor (yellow card) 86'	Stadium: Estádio José Maria de Campos Maia; Attendance: 11,729; Referee: Matheus Delgado Candaçan

19 March 2022 12	São Paulo	2–1	Botafogo	São Paulo
16:00 (UTC−3)	Rigoni 5'; Nikão (penalty missed) 63'; Luciano 86'	Report	Jean Victor 67', (yellow card) 90+6'; Tárik (yellow card) 86'	Stadium: Morumbi; Attendance: 21,827; Referee: Thiago Luis Scarascati

==== Quarter-final ====
22 March 2022 Single match	São Paulo	4–1	São Bernardo	São Paulo
20:30 (UTC−3)	Éder (yellow card) 26'; Nestor 65'; Pablo Maia (yellow card) 76', (goal) 83'; Marquinhos 88'; Welington (yellow card) 90'; Calleri 90+2'	Report	Paulinho Moccelin (yellow card) 8' (yellow-red card) 67'; Vitinho (yellow card) 42'; Rodrigo Souza (yellow card) 51'; Davó 53'	Stadium: Morumbi; Attendance: 29,731; Referee: Douglas Marques das Flores

==== Semi-final ====
27 March 2022 Single match	São Paulo	2–1	Corinthians	São Paulo
16:00 (UTC−3)	Welington 42', (yellow card) 46'; Alisson 63'; Nestor (yellow card) 71'; Luciano (yellow card) 76'; Calleri (yellow card) 87'	Report	Róger Guedes (yellow card) 36'; Du Queiroz (yellow card) 76'; Júnior Moraes (yellow card) 86'; Jô 86'; Adson (red card) 90+7'	Stadium: Morumbi; Attendance: 53,924; Referee: Vinícius Gonçalves Dias Araújo

==== Finals ====
30 March 2022 First leg	São Paulo	3–1	Palmeiras	São Paulo
21:40 (UTC-3)	Patrick (yellow card) 36'; Calleri 45+6' (pen.), 81'; Nestor (yellow card) 57'; Diego Costa (yellow card) 61'; Pablo Maia 64'; Jandrei (yellow card) 86'	Report	Jailson (yellow card) 45+2'; Raphael Veiga 85'; Gabriel Veron (yellow card) 90+2'	Stadium: Morumbi; Attendance: 60,383; Referee: Douglas Marques das Flores

3 April 2022 Second leg	Palmeiras	4–0 (5–3 agg.)	São Paulo	São Paulo
16:00 (UTC-3)	Danilo 22'; Zé Rafael 28', (yellow card) 84'; Raphael Veiga 47', 81', (yellow card) 82'; Gómez (yellow card) 72'; Wesley (yellow card) 90+1'	Report	Luan (yellow card) 72'; Luciano (yellow card) 83'; Rafinha (red card) 90'	Stadium: Allianz Parque; Attendance: 31,836; Referee: Raphael Claus

=== Copa Sudamericana ===
The draw for the group stage was held on 25 March 2022, 12:00 PYST (UTC−4), at the CONMEBOL Convention Centre in Luque, Paraguay.

Pos	Team	Pld	W	D	L	GF	GA	GD	Pts	Qualification	SPA	EVE	AYA	WIL
1	(Brazil) São Paulo	6	5	1	0	12	3	+9	16	Round of 16	—	2–0	1–0	3–0
2	(Chile) Everton	6	3	2	1	7	4	+3	11		0–0	—	2–1	1–1
3	(Peru) Ayacucho	6	1	1	4	5	8	−3	4		2–3	0–2	—	0–0
4	(Bolivia) Jorge Wilstermann	6	0	2	4	2	11	−9	2		1–3	0–2	0–2	—

Source: CONMEBOL
Rules for classification: 1) Points; 2) Goal difference; 3) Goals scored; 4) Away goals scored; 5) CONMEBOL ranking.

7 April 2022 1	Ayacucho (Peru)	2–3	(Brazil) São Paulo	Lima, Peru
21:30 UTC−3	Barrios 7'; Techera 20'; Morales (yellow card) 56'; Guidino (yellow card) 68'; Tejada (yellow card) 76' (yellow-red card) 87'; Toledo (yellow card) 90+2'; Silveira (yellow card) 90+5'	Report	Arboleda 3'; Miranda 23'; Marquinhos (yellow card) 39'; Luciano (yellow card) 49' , (goal) 88' (pen.)	Stadium: Estadio Nacional; Referee: Augusto Aragón (Ecuador)

14 April 2022 2	São Paulo (Brazil)	2–0	(Chile) Everton	São Paulo, Brazil
19:15 UTC−3	Arboleda (yellow card) 27', (goal) 31'; Igor Gomes (yellow card) 35'; Talles Costa 86', (yellow card) 90'	Report	Julio Barroso (yellow card) 67'; Diego Oyarzún (yellow card) 82'	Stadium: Morumbi; Attendance: 30,307; Referee: Pablo Echavarría (Argentina)

28 April 2022 3	Jorge Wilstermann (Bolivia)	1–3	(Brazil) São Paulo	Cochabamba, Bolivia
19:15 UTC−3	Robson (yellow card) 16'; Humberto Osorio 31' (pen.), (yellow card) 45'; Santiago Echeverría (yellow card) 37'; Maximiliano Ortiz (yellow card) 59'	Report	Igor Gomes 23', (yellow card) 85'; Luan (yellow card) 45'; Reinaldo 64' (pen.); Marquinhos 85'; Rafinha (yellow card) 90+3'	Stadium: Estadio Félix Capriles; Referee: Carlos Arturo Ortega Jaimes (Colombia)

5 May 2022 4	Everton (Chile)	0–0	(Brazil) São Paulo	Viña del Mar, Chile
19:15 UTC−3	Cristián Riquelme (yellow card) 51'	Report	Gabriel Neves (yellow card) 80'; Léo (yellow card) 82'; Talles Costa (yellow card) 85'	Stadium: Estadio Sausalito; Referee: Fernando Rapallini (Argentina)

19 May 2022 5	São Paulo (Brazil)	3–0	(Bolivia) Jorge Wilstermann	São Paulo, Brazil
21:30 UTC−3	Rodrigo Nestor 6', 17'; Welington (yellow card) 28'; Patrick 47'	Report	Pérez (yellow card) 21'	Stadium: Morumbi; Attendance: 16,675; Referee: Ángel Arteaga (Venezuela)

25 May 2022 6	São Paulo (Brazil)	1–0	(Peru) Ayacucho	São Paulo, Brazil
19:15 UTC−3	Caio Matheus 72'	Report	Toledo (yellow card) 19'; Magallanes (yellow card) 35'; Páucar (yellow card) 78'	Stadium: Morumbi; Attendance: 16,696; Referee: Carlos Benítez (Paraguay)

==== Round of 16 ====
The draw for the round of 16 was held on 27 May 2022, 12:00 PYST (UTC−4), at the CONMEBOL Convention Centre in Luque, Paraguay.

30 June 2022 First leg	Universidad Católica (Chile)	2–4	(Brazil) São Paulo	Santiago, Chile
21:30 UTC−3	González (yellow card) 12'; Zampedri 47', (yellow card) 84'; Valencia 85'	Report	Reinaldo 15' (pen.), (yellow card) 77'; Igor Vinícius (yellow card) 23' (yellow-red card) 51'; Luciano 28', 39'; Calleri (yellow card) 55' (yellow-red card) 87', (goal) 63'; André Anderson (yellow card) 60'; Rodrigo Nestor (red card) 73'; Welington (yellow card) 88'; Pablo Maia (yellow card) 90+2'	Stadium: San Carlos de Apoquindo; Referee: Christian Ferreyra (Uruguay)

7 July 2022 Second leg	São Paulo (Brazil)	4–1 (8–3 agg.)	(Chile) Universidad Católica	São Paulo, Brazil
21:30 UTC−3	Luciano 14'; Éder 45+5' (pen.), (yellow card) 55'; João Moreira 59'; Rodriguinho 81'	Report	Zampedri (yellow card) 69'; Paz (yellow card) 87'; Fuenzalida 88'	Stadium: Morumbi; Attendance: 47,097; Referee: Alexis Herrera (Venezuela)

==== Quarter-finals ====
3 August 2022 First leg	São Paulo (Brazil)	1–0	(Brazil) Ceará	São Paulo, Brazil
19:15 UTC−3	Welington (yellow card) 42'; Nikão 70'; Calleri (penalty missed) 82'; Pablo Maia (yellow card) 90+5'	Report	Nino Paraíba (yellow card) 14'; Victor Luis (yellow card) 81'	Stadium: Morumbi; Attendance: 52,338; Referee: Piero Maza (Chile)

10 August 2022 Second leg	Ceará (Brazil)	2–1 (2–2 agg.) (3–4 p)	(Brazil) São Paulo	Fortaleza, Brazil
19:15 UTC−3	Richardson (yellow card) 23'; Mendoza 44'; Castilho 63'; Victor Luis (yellow card) 76'; Vina (yellow card) 87'	Report	Galoppo (yellow card) 17'; Igor Vinícius (yellow card) 26', (goal) 53'; Miranda (yellow card) 86'; Calleri (yellow card) 90+1'	Stadium: Arena Castelão; Attendance: 53,582; Referee: Fernando Rapallini (Argentina)
	Penalties
	Castilho (penalty missed); Victor Luis (penalty scored); Matheus Peixoto (penalty scored); Erick (penalty scored); Vina (penalty missed); Fernando Sobral (penalty missed)		(penalty scored) Calleri; (penalty missed) Igor Vinícius; (penalty scored) Luciano; (penalty scored) Diego Costa; (penalty missed) Igor Gomes; (penalty scored) Patrick

==== Semi-finals ====
1 September 2022 First leg	Atlético Goianiense (Brazil)	3–1	(Brazil) São Paulo	Goiânia, Brazil
21:30 UTC−3	Jorginho 11'; Wanderson (yellow card) 28'; Dudu (yellow card) 45+2'; Edson (yellow card) 52'; Shaylon 56', (yellow card) 80'; Léo Pereira 78'	Report	Luciano 23'; Igor Gomes (yellow card) 32' (yellow-red card) 40'; Igor Vinícius (yellow card) 84'	Stadium: Estádio Serra Dourada; Attendance: 33,047; Referee: Jesús Valenzuela (Venezuela)

8 September 2022 Second leg	São Paulo (Brazil)	2–0 (3–3 agg.) (4–2 p)	(Brazil) Atlético Goianiense	São Paulo, Brazil
21:30 UTC−3	Patrick 4', 63'	Report	Wanderson (yellow card) 17'; Jefferson (yellow card) 66'	Stadium: Morumbi; Attendance: 53,988; Referee: Darío Herrera (Argentina)
	Penalties
	Reinaldo (penalty scored); Calleri (penalty scored); Luciano (penalty missed); Igor Vinícius (penalty scored); Galoppo (penalty scored)		(penalty scored) Wellington Rato; (penalty missed) Gabriel Baralhas; (penalty scored) Shaylon; (penalty missed) Léo Pereira

==== Final ====
1 October 2022 Final	São Paulo (Brazil)	0–2	(Ecuador) Independiente del Valle	Córdoba, Argentina
17:00 UTC−3	Reinaldo (yellow card) 45+1'; Calleri (yellow card) 87' (yellow-red card) 90+3'; Diego Costa (yellow card) 89' (red card) 90+6'	Report	Díaz 13'; Carabajal (yellow card) 43'; Faravelli 67'; Schunke (yellow card) 79'; Pellerano (yellow card) 89'	Stadium: Estadio Mario Alberto Kempes; Attendance: 24,683; Referee: Wilmar Roldán (Colombia)

=== Série A ===
==== League table ====
Pos	Team	Pld	W	D	L	GF	GA	GD	Pts	Qualification or relegation
7	Atlético Mineiro	38	15	13	10	45	37	+8	58	Qualification for Copa Libertadores second stage
8	Fortaleza	38	15	10	13	46	39	+7	55	Qualification for Copa Libertadores second stage
9	São Paulo	38	13	15	10	55	42	+13	54	Qualification for Copa Sudamericana group stage
10	América Mineiro	38	15	8	15	40	40	0	53	Qualification for Copa Sudamericana group stage
11	Botafogo	38	15	8	15	41	43	−2	53	Qualification for Copa Sudamericana group stage

Source: CBF
Rules for classification: 1) points; 2) wins; 3) goal difference; 4) goals scored; 5) head-to-head results (only between two teams); 6) fewest red cards; 7) fewest yellow cards; 8) drawing of lots.

==== Results summary ====
Overall								Home						Away					
Pld	W	D	L	GF	GA	GD	Pts	W	D	L	GF	GA	GD	W	D	L	GF	GA	GD
38	13	15	10	55	42	+13	54	8	6	5	32	21	+11	5	9	5	23	21	+2

==== Results by round ====
Round	1	2	3	4	5	6	7	8	9	10	11	12	13	14	15	16	17	18	19	20	21	22	23	24	25	26	27	28	29	30	31	32	33	34	35	36	37	38
Ground	H	A	A	H	A	H	A	H	A	A	H	A	H	H	A	A	H	A	H	A	H	H	A	H	A	H	A	H	H	A	H	A	A	H	H	A	H	A
Result	W	L	D	W	D	W	D	D	D	D	W	L	L	D	W	D	D	D	D	L	L	W	L	L	D	D	W	W	W	W	L	D	W	W	D	L	L	W
Position	1	7	11	5	6	3	3	5	6	6	3	5	9	8	7	7	9	10	10	10	11	11	12	13	14	13	13	12	10	10	12	12	8	8	8	9	11	9

Postponed

Source: CBF.com

==== Matches ====
The league fixtures were announced on 2 February 2022.

10 April 2022 1	São Paulo	4–0	Athletico Paranaense	São Paulo
19:00 UTC−3	Calleri 19', 52', 70'; Alisson (yellow card) 23'; Luciano 74'	Report	Pedro Henrique (yellow card) 50'; Vitor Bueno (yellow card) 57'; Christian (yellow card) 82'	Stadium: Morumbi; Attendance: 20,606; Referee: Wagner do Nascimento Magalhães

17 April 2022 2	Flamengo	3–1	São Paulo	Rio de Janeiro
16:00 UTC−3	Gabigol (yellow card) 17', (goal) 25'; João Gomes (yellow card) 45'; Isla 69'; De Arrascaeta 72'	Report	Rafinha (yellow card) 17'; Pablo Maia (yellow card) 24'; Diego Costa (yellow card) 36'; Calleri 41'; André Anderson (yellow card) 76'; Reinaldo (yellow card) 80'; Léo (yellow card) 90+1'	Stadium: Maracanã; Attendance: 54,686; Referee: Anderson Daronco

23 April 2022 3	Red Bull Bragantino	1–1	São Paulo	Bragança Paulista
16:30 UTC−3	Alerrandro 1'; Léo Realpe (yellow card) 56'; Aderlan (yellow card) 58'; Hyoran (yellow card) 79'; Carlos Eduardo (yellow card) 87'; Ramon (yellow card) 90+7'	Report	Diego Costa (yellow card) 58'; Éder 70', (yellow card) 90'	Stadium: Estádio Nabi Abi Chedid; Attendance: 8,040; Referee: Bruno Arleu de Araújo

2 May 2022 4	São Paulo	2–1	Santos	São Paulo
20:00 UTC−3	Calleri 10'; Rafinha (yellow card) 68'; Luciano 82' (pen.); Alisson (yellow card) 90+7'	Report	Marcos Leonardo 45+1', (yellow card) 66'; Madson (yellow card) 84'; Rodrigo Fernández (yellow card) 90+2'; Lucas Pires (yellow card) 90+6'	Stadium: Morumbi; Attendance: 36,746; Referee: Leandro Vuaden

8 May 2022 5	Fortaleza	1–1	São Paulo	Fortaleza
19:00 UTC−3	Benevenuto (yellow card) 15'; Yago Picachu 69', (yellow card) 88'	Report	Diego Costa (yellow card) 16'; Igor Gomes (yellow card) 45+2'; Luciano 53', (yellow card) 84'	Stadium: Arena Castelão; Attendance: 25,528; Referee: Ramon Abatti Abel

15 May 2022 6	São Paulo	2–1	Cuiabá	São Paulo
16:00 UTC−3	Luciano (yellow card) 45+1'; Calleri 66' (pen.); Nikão 82'; Igor Gomes (yellow card) 86'	Report	Jenison 33'; Marllon (yellow card) 62'; Jonathan Cafú (red card) 75'	Stadium: Morumbi; Attendance: 27,511; Referee: Alexandre Vargas Tavares de Jesus

22 May 2022 7	Corinthians	1–1	São Paulo	São Paulo
16:00 UTC−3	Du Queiroz (yellow card) 45+1'; João Victor (yellow card) 45+3'; Adson 80'	Report	Diego Costa (yellow card) 45+3'; Calleri 45+6'; Alisson (yellow card) 59'; Gabriel Neves (yellow card) 75'	Stadium: Neo Química Arena; Attendance: 44,899; Referee: Wilton Pereira Sampaio

28 May 2022 8	São Paulo	2–2	Ceará	São Paulo
19:00 UTC−3	Calleri 8'; André Anderson (yellow card) 34'; Rodrigo Nestor 42'; Rafinha (yellow card) 64'; Igor Gomes (yellow card) 66' (yellow-red card) 90'	Report	Lucas Ribeiro (yellow card) 16'; Richardson (yellow card) 20'; Cléber 37'; Mendoza 65', (yellow card) 71'; Geovane (yellow card) 86'; Bruno Pacheco (yellow card) 90+2'	Stadium: Morumbi; Attendance: 32,977; Referee: Bruno Arleu de Araújo

4 June 2022 9	Avaí	1–1	São Paulo	Florianópolis
19:00 UTC−3	Arthur Chaves (yellow card) 49'; Muriqui 66'; Bruno Cortez (yellow card) 90+8'	Report	Reinaldo 45+4' (pen.); Calleri (penalty missed) 51'; Léo (yellow card) 83'; Alisson (yellow card) 85'	Stadium: Estádio da Ressacada; Attendance: 11,968; Referee: Anderson Daronco

9 June 2022 10	Coritiba	1–1	São Paulo	Curitiba
20:00 UTC−3	Adrián Martínez (yellow card) 38'; Alef Manga (yellow card) 45+3', (goal) 59'; Igor Paixão (yellow card) 71'	Report	Calleri 8'; Diego Costa (yellow card) 30'; Igor Gomes (yellow card) 75'; Éder (yellow card) 85'	Stadium: Estádio Couto Pereira; Attendance: 24,155; Referee: Wagner do Nascimento Magalhães
Note: The match was originally scheduled for 7 June, but it was postponed due to broadcast requests.

12 June 2022 11	São Paulo	1–0	América Mineiro	São Paulo
16:00 UTC−3	Patrick 34'; Rodrigo Nestor (yellow card) 53'; Miranda (yellow card) 76'	Report	Henrique Almeida (yellow card) 77'; Wellington Paulista (yellow card) 90+4'	Stadium: Morumbi; Attendance: 26,847; Referee: Sávio Pereira Sampaio

16 June 2022 12	Botafogo	1–0	São Paulo	Rio de Janeiro
16:00 UTC−3	Patrick de Paula (yellow card) 35'; Kanu (yellow card) 38'; Saravia (yellow card) 51'; Kayque 61', (yellow card) 76'; Carlo (yellow card) 71'; Cuesta (yellow card) 83'	Report	Patrick (yellow card) 45+4'; Calleri (yellow card) 56'; Arboleda (yellow card) 65'	Stadium: Estádio Nilton Santos; Attendance: 18,677; Referee: Wilton Pereira Sampaio

20 June 2022 13	São Paulo	1–2	Palmeiras	São Paulo
20:00 UTC−3	Patrick 17'; Igor Vinícius (yellow card) 39'; Reinaldo (yellow card) 45+3'; Gabriel Neves (yellow card) 46'	Report	Danilo (yellow card) 45+4'; Gustavo Gómez 90'; Murilo 90+6'	Stadium: Morumbi; Attendance: 31,035; Referee: Anderson Daronco

26 June 2022 14	São Paulo	0–0	Juventude	São Paulo
18:00 UTC−3	Patrick (yellow card) 45+2'; Pablo Maia (yellow card) 58'; Rodrigo Nestor (yellow card) 71'	Report	Capixaba (yellow card) 45+2'; Ricardo Bueno (yellow card) 70'; Jadson (yellow card) 78'	Stadium: Morumbi; Attendance: 20,466; Referee: André Luiz de Freitas Castro

3 July 2022 15	Atlético Goianiense	1–2	São Paulo	Goiânia
16:00 UTC−3	Ramon Menezes (yellow card) 20'; Gabriel Baralhas (yellow card) 23'; Marlon Freitas 30' (pen.); Jefferson (yellow card) 35'; Shaylon (yellow card) 52'; Edson (yellow card) 86'	Report	Luciano 24' (pen.), 62', (yellow card) 73'; Diego Costa (yellow card) 28'; Calleri (yellow card) 29'; Welington (yellow card) 37'; Rodrigo Nestor (yellow card) 39'; Léo (yellow card) 54'; Gabriel Neves (yellow card) 90+9'	Stadium: Estádio Antônio Accioly; Attendance: 12,089; Referee: Wagner do Nascimento Magalhães

10 July 2022 16	Atlético Mineiro	0–0	São Paulo	Belo Horizonte
18:00 UTC−3	Hulk (yellow card) 88'	Report	Igor Vinícius (yellow card) 78'	Stadium: Mineirão; Attendance: 52,356; Referee: Anderson Daronco

17 July 2022 17	São Paulo	2–2	Fluminense	São Paulo
16:00 UTC−3	Diego Costa (yellow card) 18'; Luciano (yellow card) 31', (goal) 34'; Patrick 42', (yellow card) 67'; Jonathan Calleri (yellow card) 79'	Report	André 25', (yellow card) 78'; Manoel 64'; Caio Paulista (yellow card) 85'	Stadium: Morumbi; Attendance: 47,171; Referee: Wilton Pereira Sampaio

20 July 2022 18	Internacional	3–3	São Paulo	Porto Alegre
20:30 UTC−3	Pedro Henrique 4', 25'; Edenílson 41' (pen.); Heitor (yellow card) 64'; Moisés (yellow card) 67'; Gabriel Mercado (yellow card) 90'	Report	Nikão 4', 30'; Luciano (yellow card) 28', (goal) 54'; Thiago Couto (yellow card) 39'; Gabriel Neves (yellow card) 64'; Rafinha (yellow card) 69'; Luizão (yellow card) 83'	Stadium: Estádio Beira-Rio; Attendance: 32,804; Referee: Marcelo de Lima Henrique

23 July 2022 19	São Paulo	3–3	Goiás	São Paulo
19:00 UTC−3	Calleri 29'; Luizão (yellow card) 31'; Rodrigo Nestor 33'; Luciano (penalty missed) 45+8'; Patrick 48'; Talles Costa (yellow card) 89'	Report	Dadá Belmonte 8', (yellow card) 45+6'; Pedro Raul (yellow card) 36', (goal) 90+2'; Danilo 39'; Matheus Sales (yellow card) 45+6'; Luan Dias (yellow card) 87'; Fellipe Bastos (yellow card) 89'	Stadium: Morumbi; Attendance: 39,393; Referee: Caio Max Augusto Vieira

31 July 2022 20	Athletico Paranaense	1–0	São Paulo	Curitiba
16:00 UTC−3	Thiago Heleno (penalty missed) 54', (yellow card) 86'; Vitor Bueno 69' (pen.); Fernandinho (yellow card) 79'; Léo Cittadini (yellow card) 84'	Report	Luizão (yellow card) 42'; Felipe Alves (yellow card) 51'; Nikão (yellow card) 68'; Luciano (yellow card) 85'	Stadium: Arena da Baixada; Attendance: 26,492; Referee: Marcelo de Lima Henrique

6 August 2022 21	São Paulo	0–2	Flamengo	São Paulo
20:30 UTC−3	Pablo Maia (yellow card) 36'; Galoppo (yellow card) 59'	Report	Lázaro 7'; Hugo Souza (yellow card) 24'; Diego (yellow card) 50'; Gabriel 90+5'	Stadium: Morumbi; Attendance: 45,217; Referee: Ramon Abatti Abel

14 August 2022 22	São Paulo	3–0	Red Bull Bragantino	São Paulo
16:00 UTC−3	Rodrigo Nestor 25'; Miranda (yellow card) 31'; Calleri 59'; Igor Vinícius 61'	Report		Stadium: Morumbi; Attendance: 31,358; Referee: Paulo César Zanovelli

21 August 2022 23	Santos	1–0	São Paulo	Santos
19:00 UTC−3	Lucas Braga 33'; Bauermann (yellow card) 43'; Marcos Leonardo (yellow card) 45+5'; Felipe Jonatan (yellow card) 81'	Report	Nikão (yellow card) 44'	Stadium: Vila Belmiro; Attendance: 12,598; Referee: Wilton Pereira Sampaio

28 August 2022 24	São Paulo	0–1	Fortaleza	São Paulo
16:00 UTC−3	Reinaldo (yellow card) 58'; Patrick (yellow card) 89'	Report	Marcelo Benevenuto (yellow card) 28'; Juninho Capixaba 32'; Fernando Miguel (yellow card) 51'	Stadium: Morumbi; Attendance: 30,210; Referee: Paulo César Zanovelli

4 September 2022 25	Cuiabá	1–1	São Paulo	Cuiabá
19:00 UTC−3	Deyverson 7' (pen.), (yellow card) 31'; Valdívia (yellow card) 11'; Alan Empereur (yellow card) 37'	Report	Ferraresi (yellow card) 4'; Welington (yellow card) 45+5' (yellow-red card) 54'; Luizão 80'	Stadium: Arena Pantanal; Attendance: 33,050; Referee: Wagner do Nascimento Magalhães

11 September 2022 26	São Paulo	1–1	Corinthians	São Paulo
16:00 UTC−3	Éder 33' (pen.), (yellow card) 45+2'; Miranda; Luciano (yellow card) 85'	Report	Yuri Alberto 14'; Gil (yellow card) 87'	Stadium: Morumbi; Attendance: 46,444; Referee: Marcelo de Lima Henrique

18 September 2022 27	Ceará	0–2	São Paulo	Fortaleza
16:00 UTC−3	João Ricardo (yellow card) 37'; Luiz Otávio (red card) 39'; Jô (yellow card) 45+4'; Gabriel Lacerda (yellow card) 60'; Nino Paraíba (yellow card) 79'; Zé Roberto (red card) 85'; Richard (yellow card) 90+2'	Report	Calleri 23'; Rodrigo Nestor (yellow card) 29'; Luciano (yellow card) 29'; Bustos 90+3'	Stadium: Arena Castelão; Attendance: 43,000; Referee: Maguielson Lima Barbosa

25 September 2022 28	São Paulo	4–0	Avaí	São Paulo
20:00 UTC−3	Rodrigo Nestor (yellow card) 19'; Diego Costa 25'; Luciano 45+3'; Patrick 45+6'; Marcos Guilherme (yellow card) 90'; Éder 90+3'	Report	Bruno Silva (yellow card) 13'; Mateus Sarará (yellow card) 27'; Guerrero (yellow card) 64'; Bressan (yellow card) 67'	Stadium: Morumbi; Attendance: 36,510; Referee: Bruno Arleu de Araújo

6 October 2022 30	América Mineiro	1–2	São Paulo	Belo Horizonte
20:00 UTC−3	Aloísio 10', (yellow card) 43'; Danilo Avelar (yellow card) 25'	Report	Calleri (yellow card) 26', (goal) 34'; Pablo Maia (yellow card) 39'; Miranda (yellow card) 65'; Alisson (yellow card) 81', (goal) 90+1'	Stadium: Estádio Independência; Referee: Ramon Abatti Abel

9 October 2022 31	São Paulo	0–1	Botafogo	São Paulo
16:00 UTC−3	Léo (yellow card) 45', (red card) 87'; Pablo Maia (yellow card) 81'; Rafinha (yellow card) 84'	Report	Kanu (yellow card) 45+3'; Cuesta (yellow card) 80'; Tiquinho 90' (pen.)	Stadium: Morumbi; Attendance: 23,918; Referee: Jean Pierre Gonçalves Lima

16 October 2022 32	Palmeiras	0–0	São Paulo	São Paulo
16:00 UTC−3	Zé Rafael (yellow card) 45+4'; Murilo (yellow card) 59'; Gustavo Scarpa (penalty missed) 65'; Breno Lopes (yellow card) 90'	Report	Ferraresi (red card) 45'; Éder (yellow card) 63'; Lucas Beraldo (red card) 90+2'; Welington (yellow card) 90+3'; Calleri (yellow card) 90+6'	Stadium: Allianz Parque; Attendance: 40,795; Referee: Flávio Rodrigues de Souza

20 October 2022 29	São Paulo	3–1	Coritiba	São Paulo
20:00 UTC−3	Calleri 2', 63'; Luizão (yellow card) 35'; Luciano 72', (yellow card) 90+4'	Report	Natanael (yellow card) 37'; Jhon Chancellor (yellow card) 49'; Matheus Cadorini 84'; Diego Porfírio (yellow card) 87'; Bruno Gomes (yellow card) 90+3'; Adrián Martínez (yellow card) 90+4'	Stadium: Morumbi; Attendance: 14,993; Referee: Bráulio da Silva Machado
Note: The match, originally scheduled for 3 October, was postponed to 20 October, due to São Paulo being in the 2022 Copa Sudamericana final.

23 October 2022 33	Juventude	1–2	São Paulo	Caxias do Sul
16:00 UTC−3	Capixaba 39'; Rodrigo Soares (yellow card) 63'; Vitor Mendes (yellow card) 70'	Report	João Moreira (yellow card) 26'; Reinaldo 36', 56'; Pablo Maia (yellow card) 76'	Stadium: Estádio Alfredo Jaconi; Attendance: 3,204; Referee: Paulo Roberto Alves Júnior

27 October 2022 34	São Paulo	2–1	Atlético Goianiense	São Paulo
19:00 UTC−3	Calleri 22'; Patrick (yellow card) 37'; Luan 90+5', (yellow card) 90+6'	Report	Wanderson (yellow card) 23'; Willian Maranhão (yellow card) 64'; Gabriel Baralhas 72'; Edson Fernando (yellow card) 82'; Léo Pereira (yellow card) 90'	Stadium: Morumbi; Attendance: 17,598; Referee: Bruno Arleu de Araújo

1 November 2022 35	São Paulo	2–2	Atlético Mineiro	São Paulo
21:30 UTC−3	Pablo Maia (yellow card) 23'; Welington (yellow card) 24'; Rodrigo Nestor (yellow card) 34'; Calleri 40', 45+5'	Report	Vargas 25' (pen.), 81'; Guga (yellow card) 27'; Jair (yellow card) 40'; Jemerson (yellow card) 61'; Pavón (yellow card) 62'; Éverson (yellow card) 90+5'	Stadium: Morumbi; Attendance: 23,835; Referee: Bráulio da Silva Machado

5 November 2022 36	Fluminense	3–1	São Paulo	Rio de Janeiro
16:30 UTC−3	Nino (yellow card) 7'; Cano 46', 56', 59'	Report	Luciano 30'; Rafinha (yellow card) 78' (yellow-red card) 90+2'	Stadium: Maracanã; Attendance: 41,558; Referee: Anderson Daronco

8 November 2022 37	São Paulo	0–1	Internacional	São Paulo
21:30 UTC−3	Rodrigo Nestor (yellow card) 24'; Luizão (yellow card) 45'; André Anderson (yellow card) 81'; Patrick (yellow card) 90+7'	Report	Alan Patrick (yellow card) 6'; Maurício 21'; Rodrigo Moledo (yellow card) 41'; David (yellow card) 57'; Vitão (yellow card) 64'; Alemão (yellow card) 66'	Stadium: Morumbi; Attendance: 19,692; Referee: Wagner do Nascimento Magalhães

13 November 2022 38	Goiás	0–4	São Paulo	Goiânia
16:00 UTC−3	Maguinho (yellow card) 40'; Auremir (yellow card) 63'	Report	Galoppo 20', (yellow card) 69'; Luciano 71'; Marcos Guilherme 77'; Juan 90+1'	Stadium: Estádio da Serrinha; Referee: Marcelo de Lima Henrique

=== Copa do Brasil ===
==== First round ====
24 February 2022 Single match	Campinense	0–0	São Paulo	Campina Grande
21:30 UTC−3	Felipinho (yellow card) 36'; Claudinho (yellow card) 71'	Report	Alisson (yellow card) 17'; Éder (yellow card) 82'	Stadium: Amigão; Attendance: 5,000; Referee: Ramon Abatti Abel
Note: São Paulo qualified for the second round, due to the regulation that gives the advantage of a draw to the visiting team.

==== Second round ====
16 March 2022 Single match	São Paulo	2–0	Manaus	São Paulo
21:30 UTC−3	Éder 35'; Diego Costa 43'	Report		Stadium: Morumbi; Attendance: 17,644; Referee: Daniel Nobre Bins

==== Third round ====
20 April 2022 First leg	Juventude	2–2	São Paulo	Caxias do Sul
19:30 UTC−3	Pitta 25'; Ruiz 34'	Report	Arboleda 48'; Reinaldo 90+3' (pen.)	Stadium: Alfredo Jaconi; Attendance: 6,092; Referee: Wagner do Nascimento Magalhães

12 May 2022 Second leg	São Paulo	2–0 (4–2 agg.)	Juventude	Barueri
19:30 UTC−3	Calleri (yellow card) 19'; Arboleda 29', (yellow card) 41'; Igor Vinícius 68'; Patrick (yellow card) 72'; Luan (yellow card) 90'	Report	Jadson (yellow card) 37'	Stadium: Arena Barueri; Attendance: 14,806; Referee: Wilton Pereira Sampaio

==== Round of 16 ====
23 June 2022 First leg	São Paulo	1–0	Palmeiras	São Paulo
20:00 UTC−3	Patrick 31'; Reinaldo (yellow card) 60'; Gabriel Neves (yellow card) 73'	Report	Murilo (yellow card) 48'; Gómez (yellow card) 60'; Marcos Rocha (yellow card) 74'	Stadium: Morumbi; Attendance: 38,201; Referee: Raphael Claus

14 July 2022 Second leg	Palmeiras	2–1 (2–2 agg.) (3–4 p)	São Paulo	São Paulo
20:00 UTC−3	Piquerez 10'; Raphael Veiga 13', (yellow card) 30'; Gómez (yellow card) 69'; Marcos Rocha (yellow card) 90+2'	Report	Welington (yellow card) 5'; Gabriel Neves (yellow card) 45'; Rodrigo Nestor (yellow card) 56'; Calleri (yellow card) 64'; Luciano 70' (pen.); Nikão (yellow card) 87'	Stadium: Allianz Parque; Attendance: 41,361; Referee: Leandro Vuaden
	Penalties
	Raphael Veiga (penalty missed); Gustavo Scarpa (penalty scored); Gómez (penalty scored); Piquerez (penalty scored); Wesley (penalty missed)		(penalty missed) Luciano; (penalty scored) Calleri; (penalty scored) Nikão; (penalty scored) Igor Vinícius; (penalty scored) Igor Gomes

==== Quarter-finals ====
28 July 2022 First leg	São Paulo	1–0	América Mineiro	São Paulo
20:00 UTC−3	Luciano 35'; Igor Gomes (yellow card) 43'; Gabriel Neves (yellow card) 54'; Thiago Couto (yellow card) 65'; Galoppo (yellow card) 81'; Talles Costa (yellow card) 90+3'	Report	Henrique Almeida (yellow card) 37'; Iago Maidana (penalty missed) 67'; Pedrinho (yellow card) 90+6'	Stadium: Morumbi; Attendance: 51,297; Referee: Wilton Pereira Sampaio

18 August 2022 Second leg	América Mineiro	2–2 (2–3 agg.)	São Paulo	Belo Horizonte
21:00 UTC−3	Everaldo (yellow card) 2'; Índio Ramírez (yellow card) 14'; Wellington Paulista 44'; Alê (yellow card) 45+6'; Everaldo 65'; Matheusinho (yellow card) 81'; Éder (yellow card) 81'; Danilo Avelar (yellow card) 90+5'	Report	Luciano 23', 29', (yellow card) 24'; Miranda (yellow card) 45+4' (yellow-red card) 58'; Igor Vinícius (yellow card) 83'	Stadium: Estádio Independência; Referee: Bráulio da Silva Machado

==== Semi-finals ====
24 August 2022 First leg	São Paulo	1–3	Flamengo	São Paulo
21:30 UTC−3	Rodrigo Nestor 79'	Report	João Gomes 12'; Gabriel 67'; Everton 90+3', (yellow card) 90+4'	Stadium: Morumbi; Attendance: 51,365; Referee: Anderson Daronco

14 September 2022 Second leg	Flamengo	1–0 (4–1 agg.)	São Paulo	Rio de Janeiro
21:45 UTC−3	de Arrascaeta 36'; Léo Pereira (yellow card) 65'	Report	Reinaldo (yellow card) 14'; Welington (yellow card) 67'	Stadium: Maracanã; Attendance: 62,977; Referee: Wilton Pereira Sampaio
