= 2023 Copa do Brasil finals =

| Flamengo | São Paulo |
| (Rio de Janeiro (state)) | (São Paulo (state)) |
| 1 | 2 |

First leg
| Flamengo | São Paulo |
| 0 | 1 |
- Date: 17 September 2023
- Venue: Maracanã, Rio de Janeiro
- Man of the Match: Jonathan Calleri (São Paulo)
- Referee: Anderson Daronco (Rio Grande do Sul)
- Attendance: 67,350

Second leg
| São Paulo | Flamengo |
| 1 | 1 |
- Date: 24 September 2023
- Venue: Morumbi, São Paulo
- Man of the Match: Rodrigo Nestor (São Paulo)
- Referee: Bráulio da Silva Machado (Santa Catarina)
- Attendance: 63,077

The 2023 Copa do Brasil finals were the final two-legged tie that decided the 2023 Copa do Brasil, the 35th season of the Copa do Brasil, Brazil's national cup football tournament organised by the Brazilian Football Confederation.

The finals were contested in a two-legged home-and-away format between Flamengo, from Rio de Janeiro, and São Paulo, from São Paulo. Flamengo and São Paulo reached the Copa do Brasil finals for the ninth and second time, respectively.

The finals took place on 17 and 24 September 2023. A draw by CBF was held on 28 August 2023 to determine the home-and-away teams for each leg. The first leg was hosted by Flamengo at Maracanã in Rio de Janeiro, while the second leg was hosted by São Paulo at Morumbi in São Paulo.

São Paulo beat Flamengo 2–1 on aggregate and won their first title. As champions, São Paulo qualified for the 2024 Copa Libertadores group stage and 2024 Supercopa do Brasil.

== Teams ==
| Team | Previous finals appearances (bold indicates winners) |
|---|---|
| (Rio de Janeiro (state)) Flamengo | 8 (**1990**, 1997, 2003, 2004, **2006**, **2013**, 2017, **2022**) |
| (São Paulo (state)) São Paulo | 1 (2000) |

=== Road to the final ===
Note: In all scores below, the score of the home team is given first.

| (Rio de Janeiro (state)) Flamengo | | | Round | (São Paulo (state)) São Paulo | | |
|---|---|---|---|---|---|---|
| Opponent | Venue | Score | | Opponent | Venue | Score |
| (Paraná (state)) Maringá (won 8–4 on aggregate) | Away | 2–0 | Third Round | (São Paulo (state)) Ituano (won 1–0 on aggregate) | Home | 0–0 |
| (Paraná (state)) Maringá (won 8–4 on aggregate) | Home | 8–2 | Third Round | (São Paulo (state)) Ituano (won 1–0 on aggregate) | Away | 0–1 |
| (Rio de Janeiro (state)) Fluminense (won 2–0 on aggregate) | Away | 0–0 | Round of 16 | (Pernambuco) Sport (tied 3–3 on aggregate, won 5–3 on penalties) | Away | 0–2 |
| (Rio de Janeiro (state)) Fluminense (won 2–0 on aggregate) | Home | 2–0 | Round of 16 | (Pernambuco) Sport (tied 3–3 on aggregate, won 5–3 on penalties) | Home | 1–3 |
| (Paraná (state)) Athletico Paranaense (won 4–1 on aggregate) | Home | 2–1 | Quarter-finals | (São Paulo (state)) Palmeiras (won 3–1 on aggregate) | Home | 1–0 |
| (Paraná (state)) Athletico Paranaense (won 4–1 on aggregate) | Away | 0–2 | Quarter-finals | (São Paulo (state)) Palmeiras (won 3–1 on aggregate) | Away | 1–2 |
| (Rio Grande do Sul) Grêmio (won 3–0 on aggregate) | Away | 0–2 | Semi-finals | (São Paulo (state)) Corinthians (won 3–2 on aggregate) | Away | 2–1 |
| (Rio Grande do Sul) Grêmio (won 3–0 on aggregate) | Home | 1–0 | Semi-finals | (São Paulo (state)) Corinthians (won 3–2 on aggregate) | Home | 2–0 |

== Format ==
In the finals, the teams played a single-elimination tournament with the following rules:

- The finals were played on a home-and-away two-legged basis. The home-and-away teams for both legs were determined by a draw held on 28 August 2023 at the CBF headquarters in Rio de Janeiro, Brazil.
- If tied on aggregate, the away goals rule and extra time would not be used and the penalty shoot-out would be used to determine the winners. (Regulations Article 20).

== Matches ==
=== First leg ===
17 September 2023
16:00 UTC−3

| Flamengo (Rio de Janeiro (state)) | 0–1 | (São Paulo (state)) São Paulo |
|---|---|---|
| | Report | Calleri 45+1' |

Maracanã, Rio de Janeiro
Attendance: 67,350
Referee: Anderson Daronco (Rio Grande do Sul)

| **Flamengo** | **São Paulo** |

| GK | 25 | (Brazil) Matheus Cunha |
| RB | 43 | (Brazil) Wesley França | | (substituted off) 78' |
| CB | 4 | (Brazil) Léo Pereira | (yellow card) 14' |
| CB | 15 | (Brazil) Fabrício Bruno |
| LB | 6 | (Brazil) Ayrton Lucas |
| CM | 5 | (Chile) Erick Pulgar | | (substituted off) 78' |
| CM | 20 | (Brazil) Gerson |
| RW | 10 | (Brazil) Gabriel Barbosa (c) | | (substituted off) 75' |
| AM | 29 | (Brazil) Victor Hugo | (yellow card) 36' | (substituted off) 46' |
| LW | 27 | (Brazil) Bruno Henrique |
| CF | 9 | (Brazil) Pedro |
Substitutes:
| GK | 17 | (Argentina) Agustín Rossi |
| GK | 49 | (Brazil) Dyogo Alves |
| DF | 3 | (Brazil) Rodrigo Caio |
| DF | 23 | (Brazil) David Luiz |
| DF | 30 | (Brazil) Pablo |
| DF | 33 | (Brazil) Cleiton |
| DF | 34 | (Brazil) Matheuzinho | | (substituted on) 78' |
| MF | 7 | (Brazil) Éverton Ribeiro | | (substituted on) 46' |
| MF | 8 | (Brazil) Thiago Maia | | (substituted on) 78' |
| FW | 11 | (Brazil) Everton | | (substituted on) 75' |
| FW | 44 | (Brazil) Pedrinho |
Manager:
(Argentina) Jorge Sampaoli

| GK | 23 | (Brazil) Rafael |
| RB | 13 | (Brazil) Rafinha (c) |
| CB | 5 | (Ecuador) Robert Arboleda |
| CB | 35 | (Brazil) Lucas Beraldo |
| LB | 38 | (Brazil) Caio Paulista | | (substituted off) 74' |
| DM | 29 | (Brazil) Pablo Maia |
| CM | 25 | (Brazil) Alisson | (yellow card) 38' | (substituted off) 59' |
| CM | 11 | (Brazil) Rodrigo Nestor | | (substituted off) 67' |
| RF | 7 | (Brazil) Lucas Moura | | (substituted off) 67' |
| CF | 9 | (Argentina) Jonathan Calleri |
| LF | 27 | (Brazil) Wellington Rato | | (substituted off) 75' |
Substitutes:
| GK | 93 | (Brazil) Jandrei |
| DF | 45 | (Brazil) Nathan |
| DF | 4 | (Brazil) Diego Costa |
| DF | 28 | (Argentina) Alan Franco |
| DF | 6 | (Brazil) Welington | | (substituted on) 74' |
| MF | 8 | (Brazil) Luan |
| MF | 19 | (Colombia) James Rodríguez |
| MF | 20 | (Uruguay) Gabriel Neves | | (substituted on) 59' |
| MF | 15 | (Uruguay) Michel Araújo | | (substituted on) 67' |
| FW | 10 | (Brazil) Luciano | | (substituted on) 67' |
| FW | 22 | (Brazil) David |
| FW | 31 | (Brazil) Juan | | (substituted on) 75' |
Manager:
(Brazil) Dorival Júnior

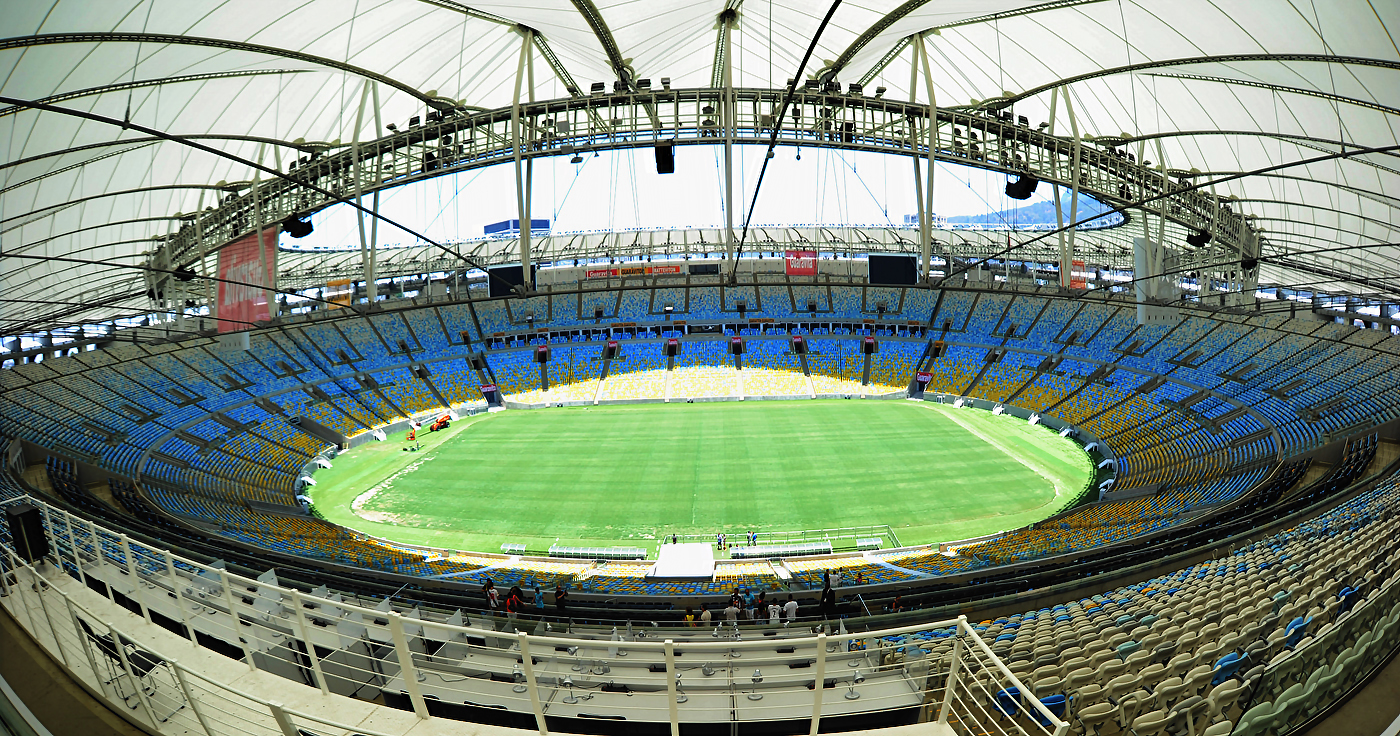
Maracanã in Rio de Janeiro hosted the first leg.

Man of the Match:
(Argentina) Jonathan Calleri (São Paulo)

Assistant referees:
Guilherme Dias Camilo (Minas Gerais)
Nailton Junior de Sousa Oliveira (Ceará)
Fourth official:
Sávio Pereira Sampaio (Distrito Federal)
Fifth official:
Lilian da Silva Fernandes Bruno (Rio de Janeiro)
Video assistant referee:
Rafael Traci (Santa Catarina)
Assistant video assistant referees:
Helton Nunes (Santa Catarina)
Daniel Nobre Bins (Rio Grande do Sul)

=== Second leg ===
24 September 2023
16:00 UTC−3

| São Paulo (São Paulo (state)) | 1–1 | (Rio de Janeiro (state)) Flamengo |
|---|---|---|
| Rodrigo Nestor 45+5' | Report | Bruno Henrique 44' |

Morumbi, São Paulo
Attendance: 63,077
Referee: Bráulio da Silva Machado (Santa Catarina)

| **São Paulo** | **Flamengo** |

| GK | 23 | (Brazil) Rafael |
| RB | 13 | (Brazil) Rafinha (c) | (yellow card) 26' |
| CB | 5 | (Ecuador) Robert Arboleda | (substituted off) 9' |
| CB | 35 | (Brazil) Lucas Beraldo |
| LB | 38 | (Brazil) Caio Paulista | | (substituted off) 65' |
| DM | 29 | (Brazil) Pablo Maia | (yellow card) 25' |
| CM | 25 | (Brazil) Alisson | (yellow card) 17' | (substituted off) 66' |
| CM | 11 | (Brazil) Rodrigo Nestor | | (substituted off) 80' |
| RF | 7 | (Brazil) Lucas Moura |
| CF | 9 | (Argentina) Jonathan Calleri |
| LF | 27 | (Brazil) Wellington Rato | | (substituted off) 80' |
Substitutes:
| GK | 93 | (Brazil) Jandrei |
| DF | 45 | (Brazil) Nathan |
| DF | 4 | (Brazil) Diego Costa | (substituted on) 9' |
| DF | 28 | (Argentina) Alan Franco |
| DF | 6 | (Brazil) Welington | | (substituted on) 65' |
| MF | 8 | (Brazil) Luan |
| MF | 19 | (Colombia) James Rodríguez |
| MF | 20 | (Uruguay) Gabriel Neves | | (substituted on) 66' | (yellow card) 90+5' (yellow-red card) 90+9' |
| MF | 15 | (Uruguay) Michel Araújo | | (substituted on) 80' |
| FW | 10 | (Brazil) Luciano | | (substituted on) 80' |
| FW | 22 | (Brazil) David |
| FW | 31 | (Brazil) Juan |
Manager:
(Brazil) Dorival Júnior

| GK | 17 | (Argentina) Agustín Rossi |
| RB | 43 | (Brazil) Wesley França |
| CB | 4 | (Brazil) Léo Pereira | (yellow card) 31' |
| CB | 15 | (Brazil) Fabrício Bruno | (yellow card) 90+7' |
| LB | 6 | (Brazil) Ayrton Lucas |
| DM | 5 | (Chile) Erick Pulgar |
| DM | 8 | (Brazil) Thiago Maia | (substituted off) 64' |
| CM | 20 | (Brazil) Gerson | (substituted off) 81' |
| RF | 14 | (Uruguay) Giorgian de Arrascaeta | (substituted off) 81' |
| CF | 9 | (Brazil) Pedro | (substituted off) 74' |
| LF | 27 | (Brazil) Bruno Henrique (c) |
Substitutes:
| GK | 1 | (Brazil) Santos |
| GK | 25 | (Brazil) Matheus Cunha |
| DF | 3 | (Brazil) Rodrigo Caio |
| DF | 16 | (Brazil) Filipe Luís |
| DF | 23 | (Brazil) David Luiz |
| DF | 30 | (Brazil) Pablo |
| DF | 34 | (Brazil) Matheuzinho |
| MF | 7 | (Brazil) Éverton Ribeiro | (substituted on) 81' |
| MF | 29 | (Brazil) Victor Hugo | (substituted on) 81' |
| CF | 10 | (Brazil) Gabriel Barbosa | (substituted on) 74' |
| FW | 11 | (Brazil) Everton |
| FW | 31 | (Brazil) Luiz Araújo | (substituted on) 64' |
Manager:
(Argentina) Jorge Sampaoli

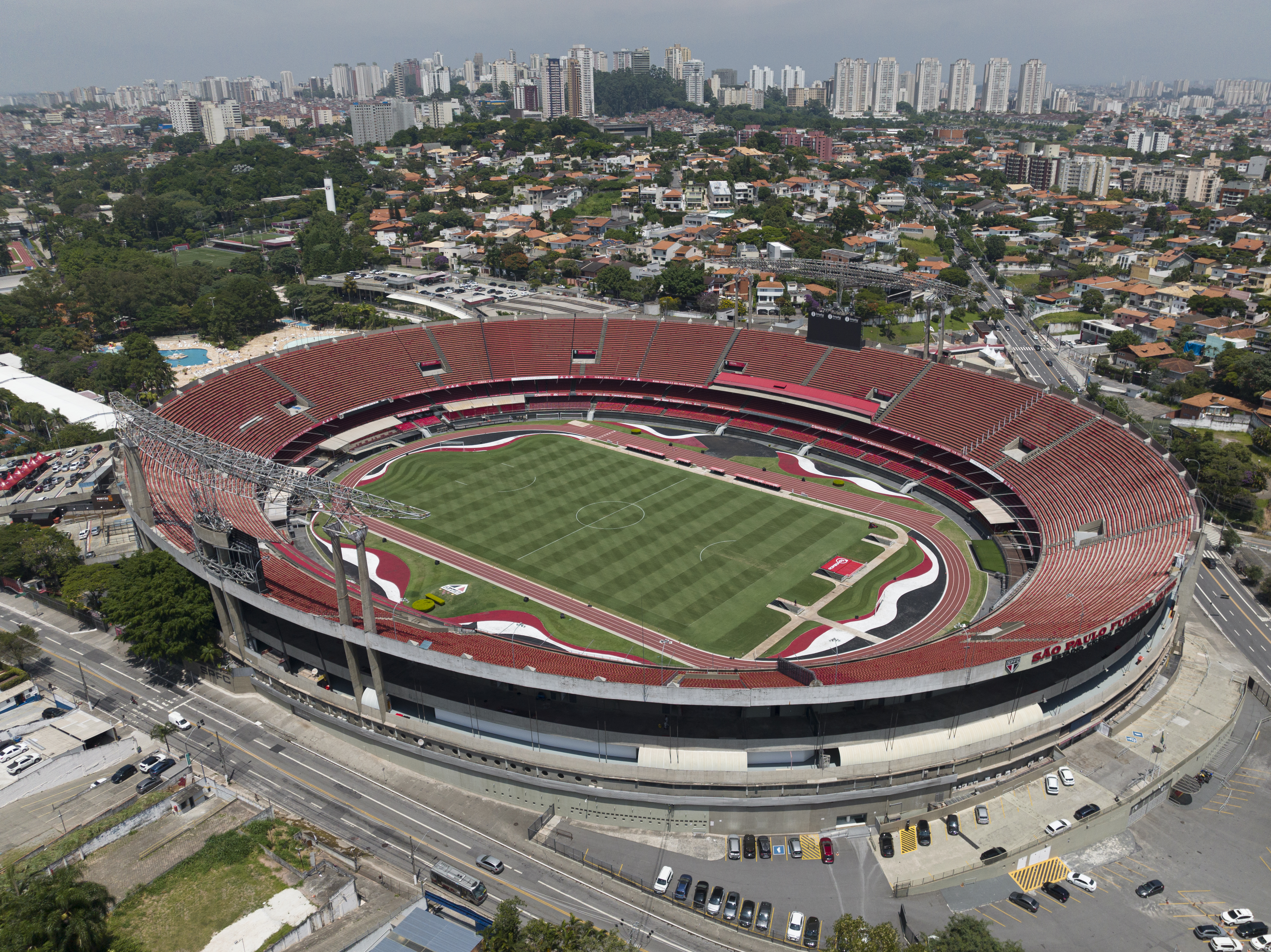
Morumbi in São Paulo hosted the second leg.

Man of the Match:
(Brazil) Rodrigo Nestor (São Paulo)

Assistant referees:
Bruno Raphael Pires (Goiás)
Bruno Boschilia (Paraná)
Fourth official:
Paulo Cesar Zanovelli da Silva (Minas Gerais)
Fifth official:
Fabrini Bevilaqua Costa (São Paulo)
Video assistant referee:
Wagner Reway (Paraíba)
Assistant video assistant referees:
Cleriston Clay Barreto Rios (Sergipe)
Pablo Ramon Goncalves Pinheiro (Rio Grande do Norte)

== See also ==
- 2023 Campeonato Brasileiro Série A
