= CFA Cotia =

Football club training ground

Centro de Formação de Atletas Laudo Natel
- CFA Cotia
- Interactive map of Centro de Formação de Atletas Laudo Natel
- Location: Cotia, São Paulo; Brazil
- Coordinates: 23.62032389165256°S 46.91459095460908°W
- Owner: São Paulo FC
- Type: Football training ground

Construction
- Opened: 16 July 2005; 21 years ago
- Cost: R$ 8.2 million

Tenants
- São Paulo FC (youth); São Paulo FC (women)

Website
- CFA Cotia

The CFA Cotia (full name Centro de Formação de Atletas Laudo Natel) is the training ground of the youth sectors of the football club São Paulo FC. Is located at the city of Cotia, metropolitan area of São Paulo, and it has a total area of c. 230,000 m².

== History ==
Created by the president at the time, Marcelo Portugal Gouvêa, São Paulo FC was one of the first Brazilian clubs to construct a training structure dedicated to youth sectors. At a cost of 2.2 million, a plot of land measuring just over 220,000 square meters was acquired next to the Siled Fongaro stud farm in 2004, with an estimated additional 6 million invested in land preparation and construction. In 2007, São Paulo acquired an additional adjacent property, increasing the total area to 230,000 square meters.

The CFA is named in honor of the former president of São Paulo FC and former governor of São Paulo, Laudo Natel.

== Facilities ==
Below is a list of the structures included in the CFA Cotia:

- Eight official-sized fields, seven with natural grass and one with synthetic grass.
- Four reduced-size fields (7-a-side soccer, indoor soccer).
- One sand court (beach soccer, volleyball, recreational).
- One multi-sport court.
- Eight locker rooms for 30 athletes each.
- Parking for 208 vehicles.
- Accommodation for 120 athletes.
- Cafeteria, kitchen, and laundry.
- One short competition pool and two recreational pools.
- Maintenance workshop, carpentry shop.
- Community garden (tended by the athletes themselves).
- Medical specialty rooms and laboratories (physiology, physiotherapy, dentistry, podiatry, psychology).
- Two additional lakes (used as reservoirs for sustainable irrigation).
- Adjoined accommodation with 140 rooms and a leisure room.
- Study facilities for athletes.
- Adjoined outdoor leisure facilities for 100 people (barbecue grill, kiosks).

=== Estádio Marcelo Portugal Gouvêa ===
The CFA main field, the Marcelo Portugal Gouvêa Stadium, was inaugurated on 16 April 2011. Designed by Ruy Ohtake, with lighting and stands for 1,500 spectators, it is used in official competitions such as the state and national youth competitions, as well as the Brazilian Women's Championship.

== Notable former players ==
- Breno
- Oscar
- Wellington
- Henrique Almeida
- Ederson
- Everson
- Casemiro
- Lucas Moura
- Bruno Uvini
- Richard
- Rodrigo Caio
- Lucas Piazon
- João Schmidt
- Ademilson
- Auro Jr.
- Gabriel Boschilia
- Lucas Evangelista
- Ewandro
- Gustavo Hebling
- Hugo Gomes
- João Paulo
- Luiz Araújo
- David Neres
- Lucas Perri
- Éder Militão
- Luan
- Tuta
- Diego Costa
- Igor Gomes
- Jonas Toró
- Brenner
- Helinho
- Antony
- Gabriel Sara
- Rodrigo Nestor
- Morato
- Welington
- Antonio Galeano
- Juan
- Lucas Beraldo
- Pablo Maia
- Patryck Lanza
- João Moreira
- Rodriguinho
- William Gomes
- Ryan Francisco
- Lucas Ferreira
- Matheus Alves
