= Maioli =

Maioli is an Italian surname. Notable people with the surname include:

- Gabriel Maioli (born 2003), Brazilian footballer
- Giordano Maioli (born 1943), Italian tennis player
- Walter Maioli (born 1950), Italian archaeologist and musician
