= Rokenedy =

Brazilian footballer (born 2002)

Personal information
- Full name: Rokenedy dos Santos
- Date of birth: 16 August 2002 (age 24)
- Place of birth: Itabaiana, Brazil
- Height: 1.90 m (6 ft 3 in)
- Position: Goalkeeper

Team information
- Current team: Santa Cruz

Youth career
- 2018–2019: América de Natal
- 2019: Internacional
- 2019–2021: Santa Cruz
- 2020–2021: → Athletico Paranaense (loan)
- 2021–2022: São Paulo

Senior career*
Years	Team	Apps	(Gls)
2022	São Paulo	0	(0)
2023	Maguary-PE	2	(0)
2023–	Santa Cruz	31	(0)
2024	→ Fluminense-PI (loan)	0	(0)
2024	→ Jaguar (loan)	13	(0)
- * Club domestic league appearances and goals as of 9 November 2026

Rokenedy dos Santos (born 16 August 2002), simply known as Rokenedy, is a Brazilian professional footballer who plays as a goalkeeper for Santa Cruz.

== Career ==
Rokenedy played in the youth categories of several clubs: América-RN, Internacional, Santa Cruz, Athletico Paranaense and São Paulo. In 2022, following injuries to other club goalkeepers such as Jandrei and Young Moraes, he was promoted to third goalkeeper by coach Rogério Ceni, being taken as a substitute in some matches of the 2022 Campeonato Brasileiro Série A. In 2023, Rokenedy was released by the club and signed a contract with AA Maguary to compete in the 2023 Campeonato Pernambucano.

On 6 April 2023 Rokenedy returned to Santa Cruz for the club's squad composition. In 2024, the year in which Santa Cruz failed to qualify for the Campeonato Brasileiro Série D, he was loaned to Fluminense-PI and later to Jaguar, where he was champion of the second level of state football.

In 2025 he returned as Santa Cruz FC starting goalkeeper, and was a highlight of the club in the Campeonato Pernambucano first stage campaign. His contract was renewed on February 21.

== Honours ==
Jaguar

- Campeonato Pernambucano Second Division: 2024
