= Luizão (footballer, born 2002) =

Brazilian footballer

Personal information
- Full name: Luiz Gustavo Oliveira da Silva
- Date of birth: 8 March 2002 (age 24)
- Place of birth: São Paulo, Brazil
- Height: 1.87 m (6 ft 2 in)
- Position: Centre-back

Team information
- Current team: São Bernardo

Youth career
- 2017–2022: São Paulo

Senior career*
Years	Team	Apps	(Gls)
2022–2023	São Paulo	14	(1)
2023–2025	West Ham United	0	(0)
2025	→ Pogoń Szczecin (loan)	4	(0)
2025	→ Pogoń Szczecin II (loan)	2	(0)
2025	Criciúma	3	(0)
2026–	São Bernardo	12	(0)
- * Club domestic league appearances and goals as of 18 November 2026

Luiz Gustavo Oliveira da Silva (born 8 March 2002), or simply Luizão, is a Brazilian professional footballer who plays as a centre-back for São Bernardo

== Career ==
Luizão made his professional debut with São Paulo at the 2022 Copa Sudamericana 0–0 draw against Everton, on 5 May 2022.

On 18 December 2022, it was announced that Luizão would be joining English Premier League club West Ham United when the English transfer window opened on 1 January 2023, after an undisclosed transfer fee was agreed.

On 21 February 2025, he was sent on loan to Polish club Pogoń Szczecin for the remainder of the season.

In August 2025, Luizão left West Ham by mutual consent without having played a first–team for the club. He signed on 19 September with the Campeonato Brasileiro Série B club Criciúma.

After only three matches he left Criciúma, and for the 2026 season he signed with São Bernardo to compete in the Campeonato Brasileiro Série B.

== Career statistics ==
As of match played 24 May 2025

Appearances and goals by club, season and competition
Club	Season	League			National cup (Note: Includes Copa do Brasil)		League cup		Other		Total	
Club	Season	Division	Apps	Goals	Apps	Goals	Apps	Goals	Apps	Goals	Apps	Goals
São Paulo	2022	Série A	14	1	4	0	—		5 (Note: Appearances in Copa Sudamericana)	0	23	1
West Ham United U21	2022–23	—			—		—		—		0	0
West Ham United U21	2023–24	—			—		—		5 (Note: Appearance(s) in EFL Trophy)	0	5	0
West Ham United U21	2024–25	—			—		—		6 (Note: Three appearances in EFL Trophy, three appearances in National League Cup)	0	6	0
West Ham United U21	Total	—			—		—		11	0	11	0
Pogoń Szczecin (loan)	2024–25	Ekstraklasa	4	0	0	0	—		—		4	0
Pogoń Szczecin II (loan)	2024–25	III liga, gr. II	2	0	—		—		—		2	0
Career total			20	1	4	0	0	0	16	0	40	1
