= Marquinhos (footballer, born 2003) =

Brazilian footballer (born 2003)

Personal information
- Full name: Marcus Vinicius Oliveira Alencar
- Date of birth: 7 April 2003 (age 23)
- Place of birth: São Paulo, Brazil
- Height: 1.75 m (5 ft 9 in)
- Position: Winger

Team information
- Current team: Cruzeiro
- Number: 11

Youth career
- 2010–2020: São Paulo

Senior career*
Years	Team	Apps	(Gls)
2020–2022	São Paulo	33	(2)
2022–2025	Arsenal	1	(0)
2023	→ Norwich City (loan)	11	(1)
2023–2024	→ Nantes (loan)	7	(0)
2024	→ Fluminense (loan)	23	(0)
2025	→ Cruzeiro (loan)	6	(0)
2025–	Cruzeiro	21	(1)

International career^{‡}
2019	Brazil U16	4	(1)
2019	Brazil U17	3	(0)
2023–	Brazil U20	5	(1)
2023–	Brazil U23	5	(0)
Medal record
Men's football
Representing Brazil
Pan American Games
Winner	2023 Santiago
- * Club domestic league appearances and goals as of 13 December 2025 ‡ National team caps and goals as of 16:24, 12 January 2024 (UTC)

Marcus Vinicius Oliveira Alencar (born 7 April 2003), better known professionally as Marquinhos, is a Brazilian professional footballer who plays as a winger for Campeonato Brasileiro Série A club Cruzeiro.

== Club career ==
=== São Paulo ===
Marquinhos made his professional debut for São Paulo on 11 July 2021, coming on as a 78th minute substitute in a 1–0 Série A home win against Bahia.

=== Arsenal ===
On 13 June 2022, Marquinhos signed for English club Arsenal on a long-term contract. However, fellow Premier League side Wolverhampton Wanderers were considering taking legal action against both Marquinhos and São Paulo, as Marquinhos had reportedly signed a pre-contract agreement with them prior to joining Arsenal.

On 8 September, Marquinhos made his competitive debut for Arsenal in a 2–1 UEFA Europa League away win over Zürich, where he scored his first goal both for the club and in European competition, and also registered an assist for Eddie Nketiah in the same match. He made his Premier League debut on 18 September, coming on as a late substitute for Bukayo Saka in a 3–0 win at Brentford. His first appearance at the Emirates Stadium came on 6 October, in the Europa League game against Bodø/Glimt.

==== Loan to Norwich City ====
On 31 January 2023, Marquinhos joined Championship club Norwich City on loan for the rest of the 2022–23 season. He made his debut on 25 February, scoring once and also providing an assist for Gabriel Sara in Norwich's 2–0 win against Cardiff City.

Marquinhos received the first red card of his senior career on 15 March in Norwich's draw at Huddersfield Town after he appeared to elbow Josh Ruffels. However, Norwich successfully appealed the decision, and the three-match ban was overturned.

==== Loan to Nantes ====
On 12 August 2023, Ligue 1 side Nantes announced the signing of Marquinhos on a season-long loan from Arsenal, with no future option to make the move permanent. On 12 January, he was recalled by Arsenal.

==== Loan to Fluminense ====
On 15 February 2024, Marquinhos returned to his native Brazil, joining Fluminense on loan until January 2025.

=== Cruzeiro ===
On 9 January 2025, Marquinhos joined Cruzeiro on a one-year loan. On 9 June 2025, he signed for the club permanently.

== Career statistics ==
=== Club ===
As of match played on 1 June 2025

Appearances and goals by club, season and competition
Club	Season	League			State league		National cup (Note: Includes Copa do Brasil, FA Cup & Coupe de France)		League cup (Note: Includes EFL Cup)		Continental		Other		Total	
Club	Season	Division	Apps	Goals	Apps	Goals	Apps	Goals	Apps	Goals	Apps	Goals	Apps	Goals	Apps	Goals
São Paulo	2021	Série A	21	0	0	0	1	0	—		2 (Note: Appearances in Copa Libertadores)	1	—		24	1
São Paulo	2022	Série A	1	0	11 (Note: Appearances in Campeonato Paulista)	2	3	0	—		3 (Note: Appearances in Copa Sudamericana)	1	—		18	3
São Paulo	Total		22	0	11	2	4	0	—		5	2	—		42	4
Arsenal	2022–23	Premier League	1	0	—		1	0	1	0	3 (Note: Appearances in UEFA Europa League)	1	—		6	1
Norwich City (loan)	2022–23	EFL Championship	11	1	—		—		—		—		—		11	1
Nantes (loan)	2023–24	Ligue 1	7	0	—		0	0	—		—		—		7	0
Fluminense (loan)	2024	Série A	20	0	3 (Note: Appearances in Campeonato Carioca)	0	1	0	—		5	2	—		29	2
Cruzeiro (loan)	2025	Série A	6	0	7 (Note: Appearances in Campeonato Mineiro)	0	0	0	—		0	0	—		13	0
Cruzeiro	2025	Série A	0	0	0	0	0	0	—		0	0	—		0	0
Career total			67	1	21	2	6	0	1	0	13	5	0	0	108	8

== Honours ==
São Paulo

- Campeonato Paulista: 2021

Brazil U23

- Pan American Games: 2023

Fluminense

- Recopa Sudamericana: 2024
