= Rodriguinho (footballer, born 2004) =

Brazilian footballer

Personal information
- Full name: Rodrigo Huendra Almeida Mendonça
- Date of birth: 16 March 2004 (age 22)
- Place of birth: Mineiros, Brazil
- Height: 1.86 m (6 ft 1 in)
- Position: Attacking midfielder

Team information
- Current team: Red Bull Bragantino
- Number: 20

Youth career
- 2015–2023: São Paulo

Senior career*
| Years | Team | Apps | (Gls) |
| 2022–2025 | São Paulo | 38 | (0) |
| 2026– | Red Bull Bragantino | 6 | (1) |

International career
| 2019 | Brazil U15 | | |
- * Club domestic league appearances and goals as of 7 April 2026

Rodrigo Huendra Almeida Mendonça (born 16 March 2004), most known as Rodriguinho, is a Brazilian professional footballer who plays as an attacking midfielder for Campeonato Brasileiro Série A club Red Bull Bragantino.

== Professional career ==
Rodriguinho made his professional debut with São Paulo at the 2022 Copa Sudamericana 4–1 win against Universidad Católica, on 8 July 2022, and scored his first professional goal.

He becomes the first youth player of São Paulo to score a goal in the debut game.

After failing to establish himself at São Paulo FC, especially due to the great number of injuries, in January 2026, Rodriguinho was sold to Red Bull Bragantino for R$ 19 million.

== Career statistics ==
=== Club ===
As of 19 July 2022

| Club | Season | League | | | State League | | Cup | | Continental | | Other | | Total | |
| Club | Season | Division | Apps | Goals | Apps | Goals | Apps | Goals | Apps | Goals | Apps | Goals | Apps | Goals |
|---|---|---|---|---|---|---|---|---|---|---|---|---|---|---|
| São Paulo | 2022 | Série A | 1 | 0 | 0 | 0 | 0 | 0 | 1 (Note: Appearances in the Copa Sudamericana) | 1 | 0 | 0 | 2 | 1 |
| Career total | | | 1 | 0 | 0 | 0 | 0 | 0 | 1 | 1 | 0 | 0 | 2 | 1 |

== Honours ==
São Paulo

- Copa do Brasil: 2023

São Paulo U17

- Copa do Brasil Sub-17: 2020

Brazil U15

- South American U-15 Championship: 2019
