= Anílson =

Brazilian footballer

Personal information
- Full name: Anílson Dourado Santiago
- Date of birth: 4 September 2001 (age 25)
- Place of birth: Palmeirândia, Brazil
- Height: 1.85 m (6 ft 1 in)
- Position: Defender

Team information
- Current team: Austria Lustenau
- Number: 21

Youth career
- 2014–2021: São Paulo

Senior career*
Years	Team	Apps	(Gls)
2021–2023	São Paulo	0	(0)
2022	→ Aimoré (loan)	19	(0)
2022–2023	→ Náutico (loan)	26	(2)
2023	Ponte Preta	0	(0)
2023	Paysandu	7	(0)
2024	Novo Hamburgo	10	(0)
2024–2026	Paços de Ferreira	62	(2)
2026–	Austria Lustenau	3	(0)
- * Club domestic league appearances and goals as of 19 September 2026

Anílson Dourado Santiago (born 4 September 2001), simply known as Anílson, is a Brazilian professional footballer who plays as a defender for Austrian Bundesliga club Austria Lustenau.

== Career ==
Initiated in the youth categories of São Paulo FC, he began his career as a professional at CE Aimoré de São Leopoldo, competing in the 2022 Campeonato Brasileiro Série D. At the end of the club's participation in the competition, he was loaned again, this time to Náutico. He remained at the club until the end of the 2023 Campeonato Pernambucano, when he returned from loan, and without being used, was released by São Paulo FC. Days later, he signed with Ponte Preta.

Due incompatibilities with the Ponte Preta technical committee, he asked to resign the contract. On 20 July, Anílson signed with Paysandu.

On 19 August 2026, Anilson signed a two-year contract with Austria Lustenau in Austria.

== Career statistics ==
As of match played 1 September 2024

Appearances and goals by club, season and competition
Club	Season	League			State League		National cup		Continental		Other		Total	
Club	Season	Division	Apps	Goals	Apps	Goals	Apps	Goals	Apps	Goals	Apps	Goals	Apps	Goals
São Paulo	2020	Série A	—		—		—		0	0	—		0	0
São Paulo	2021	Série A	—		—		0	0	0	0	—		0	0
São Paulo	Total		—		—		0	0	0	0	—		0	0
Aimoré (loan)	2022	Série D	15	0	4 (Note: Appearance(s) in Campeonato Gaúcho Série A)	0	—		—		—		19	0
Náutico (loan)	2022	Série B	10	0	—		—		—		—		10	0
Náutico (loan)	2023	Série C	—		10 (Note: Appearance(s) in Campeonato Pernambucano Série A1)	2	1	0	—		6 (Note: Appearance(s) in Copa do Nordeste)	0	17	2
Náutico (loan)	Total		10	0	10	2	1	0	—		6	0	27	2
Ponte Preta	2023	Série B	0	0	—		—		—		—		0	0
Paysandu	2023	Série C	7	0	—		—		—		—		7	0
Novo Hamburgo	2024	Série D	—		10	0	—		—		—		10	0
Paços de Ferreira	2024-25	Liga Portugal 2	4	0	—		—		—		—		4	0
Career Total			36	0	24	2	1	0	—		6	0	67	2
