= João Moreira (footballer, born 2004) =

Brazilian footballer

Personal information
- Full name: João Moreira Sanmartin Souza
- Date of birth: 21 May 2004 (age 22)
- Place of birth: São Paulo, Brazil
- Height: 1.81 m (5 ft 11 in)
- Position: Right-back

Team information
- Current team: Al-Nasr

Youth career
- 2017: Audax-SP
- 2017–2024: São Paulo

Senior career*
| Years | Team | Apps | (Gls) |
| 2022–2026 | São Paulo | 19 | (0) |
| 2025–2026 | → Porto B (loan) | 12 | (1) |
| 2026– | Al-Nasr | 0 | (0) |

International career
| 2021–2022 | Portugal U18 | 8 | (0) |
| 2022 | Brazil U20 | 1 | (0) |
- * Club domestic league appearances and goals as of 25 July 2026

João Moreira Sanmartin Souza (born 25 May 2004), known as João Moreira or simply Moreira, is a Brazilian professional footballer who plays as a right-back for Al-Nasr. Born in Brazil, he has represented both his country of birth and Portugal at youth level.

== Club career ==
Moreira made his professional debut for São Paulo FC against EC Água Santa, on 28 February 2022. He scored his first goal playing in the 2022 Copa Sudamericana, against Universidad Católica, on 7 July. He was also highlighted for his performance in the 2024 Supercopa do Brasil, where Moreira replaced an injured Rafinha.

On 29 January 2025, Moreira agreed a loan with FC Porto for one season, and an option to purchase for €3.5 million. The player was sent to Porto B, making his debut in a match against Académico, valid for Liga Portugal 2, on 1 February 2025.

In late July 2026, having received no opportunities, Moreira was released on a free transfer to the Emirati club Al-Nasr SC.

== International career ==
Grandson of Portuguese parents, João Moreira played in 2021 for the Portugal under-18 team. In August 2022, he was called up to the Brazil under-20 team, but was seriously injured during a training session, which kept him out of action for 9 months. In 2023, he was called up by the Brazil under-23 team to compete in the Pan American Games, but ended up injured again and replaced by Miranda on the final list.

== Career statistics ==
=== Club ===
As of 8 July 2022

Appearances and goals by club, season and competition
| Club | Season | League | | | State league | | National cup | | Continental | | Other | | Total | |
| Club | Season | Division | Apps | Goals | Apps | Goals | Apps | Goals | Apps | Goals | Apps | Goals | Apps | Goals |
|---|---|---|---|---|---|---|---|---|---|---|---|---|---|---|
| São Paulo | 2022 | Série A | 0 | 0 | 3 | 0 | 1 | 0 | 2 (Note: Appearances in Copa Sudamericana) | 1 | 0 | 0 | 6 | 1 |
| Career total | | | 0 | 0 | 3 | 0 | 1 | 0 | 2 | 1 | 0 | 0 | 6 | 1 |

== Honours ==
São Paulo

- Copa do Brasil: 2023
- Supercopa do Brasil: 2024

São Paulo U17

- Copa do Brasil Sub-17: 2020
- Supercopa do Brasil Sub-17: 2020

Portugal U18

- Torneio Internacional do Porto: 2022
