= Caio Matheus =

Brazilian footballer (born 2004)

Personal information
- Full name: Caio Matheus da Silva
- Date of birth: 19 February 2004 (age 22)
- Place of birth: Limeira, São Paulo, Brazil
- Height: 1.73 m (5 ft 8 in)
- Position: Forward

Team information
- Current team: Pouso Alegre

Youth career
- 2015–2024: São Paulo

Senior career*
Years	Team	Apps	(Gls)
2022–2024	São Paulo	1	(0)
2025–2026	Coritiba	5	(0)
2026–	Real Murcia	0	(0)
2026–	Real Murcia B	7	(1)

International career
2022	Brazil U20	3	(1)
- * Club domestic league appearances and goals as of 11 August 2025

Caio Matheus da Silva (born 19 February 2004) is a Brazilian professional footballer who plays as a forward for Spanish Primera Federación club Real Murcia.

== Club career ==
On 2 February 2026, Caio Matheus joined Murcia in Spanish third tier and was initially registered for their reserve squad Real Murcia Imperial.

== Career statistics ==
=== Club ===
As of 14 February 2022.

Club	Season	League			State League		Cup		Continental		Other		Total	
Club	Season	Division	Apps	Goals	Apps	Goals	Apps	Goals	Apps	Goals	Apps	Goals	Apps	Goals
São Paulo	2022	Série A	0	0	1 (Note: Appearances in the Campeonato Paulista)	0	0	0	2	1	0	0	3	1
Career total			0	0	1	0	0	0	2	1	0	0	3	1

== Honours ==
São Paulo U20

- Copa do Brasil Sub-20: 2024

São Paulo U17

- Copa do Brasil Sub-17: 2020
- Supercopa do Brasil Sub-17: 2020

Brazil U20

- Torneio Internacional do Espírito Santo: 2022
