= Rodrigo Nestor =

Brazilian footballer (born 2000)

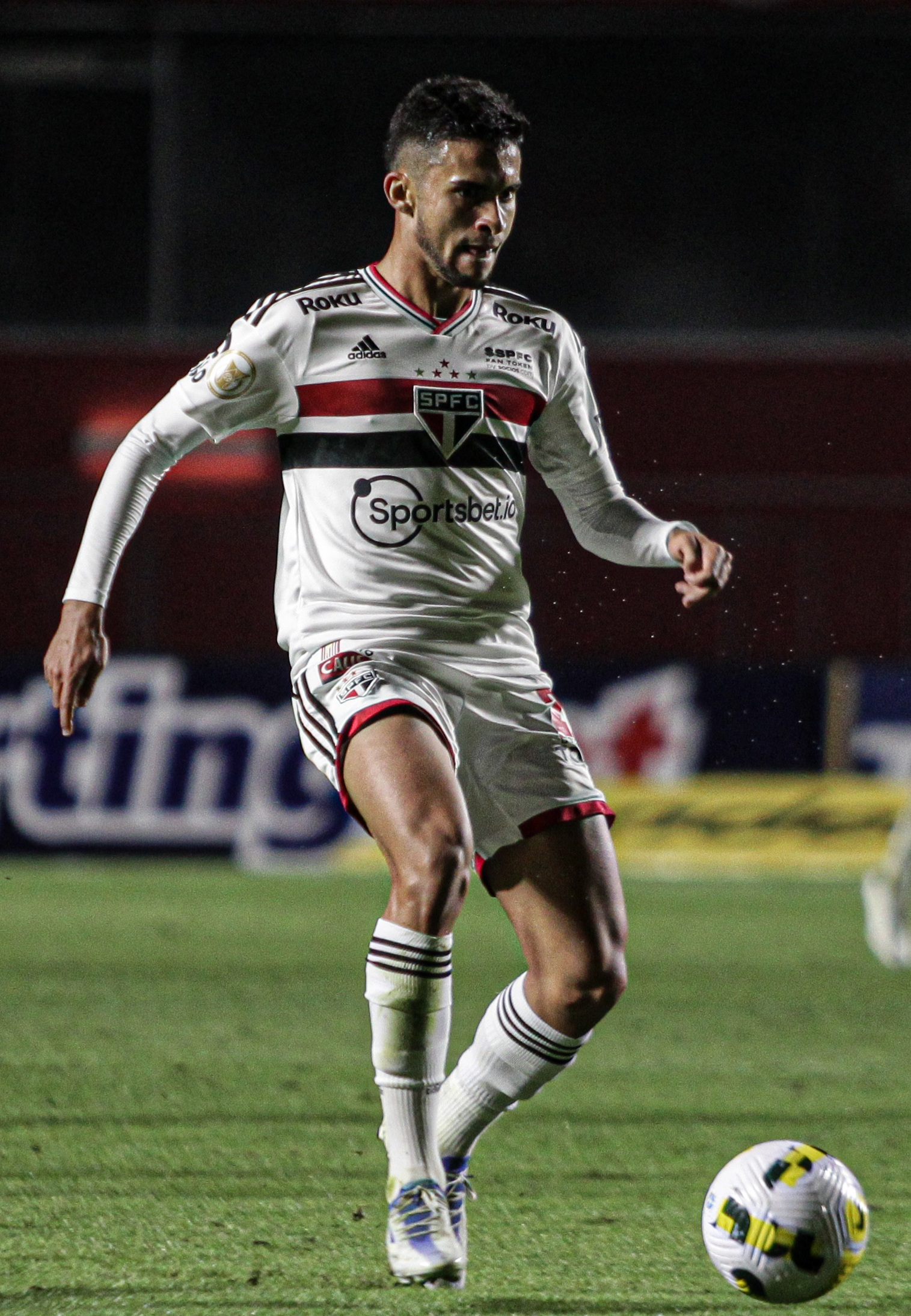
- Nestor playing for São Paulo in 2022

Personal information
- Full name: Rodrigo Nestor Bertalia
- Date of birth: 9 August 2000 (age 26)
- Place of birth: São Paulo, Brazil
- Height: 1.75 m (5 ft 9 in)
- Position: Midfielder

Team information
- Current team: Bahia
- Number: 11

Youth career
- 2009–2014: Juventus-SP
- 2014–2020: São Paulo

Senior career*
| Years | Team | Apps | (Gls) |
| 2020–2025 | São Paulo | 156 | (7) |
| 2025 | → Bahia (loan) | 30 | (6) |
| 2026– | Bahia | 36 | (3) |

International career
| 2015 | Brazil U15 | | |
| 2017 | Brazil U17 | 10 | (0) |
- * Club domestic league appearances and goals as of 14:10, 11 November 2026 (UTC)

Rodrigo Nestor Bertalia (born 9 August 2000) is a Brazilian professional footballer who plays as a midfielder for Campeonato Brasileiro Série A club Bahia.

== Career statistics ==
As of 10 November 2026.

| Club | Season | League | | | State League | | Cup | | Continental | | Other | | Total | |
| Club | Season | Division | Apps | Goals | Apps | Goals | Apps | Goals | Apps | Goals | Apps | Goals | Apps | Goals |
|---|---|---|---|---|---|---|---|---|---|---|---|---|---|---|
| São Paulo | 2020 | Série A | 6 | 0 | 2 | 0 | 0 | 0 | 2 (Note: Appearance(s) in Copa Libertadores) | 0 | — | | 10 | 0 |
| São Paulo | 2021 | Série A | 30 | 0 | 12 | 1 | 5 | 0 | 8 | 0 | — | | 55 | 1 |
| São Paulo | 2022 | Série A | 29 | 3 | 15 | 2 | 9 | 1 | 9 (Note: Appearance(s) in Copa Sudamericana) | 2 | — | | 62 | 8 |
| São Paulo | 2023 | Série A | 25 | 1 | 12 | 0 | 9 | 1 | 8 | 0 | — | | 54 | 2 |
| São Paulo | 2024 | Série A | 25 | 0 | 0 | 0 | 6 | 0 | 7 | 1 | — | | 38 | 1 |
| São Paulo | Total | | 115 | 4 | 41 | 3 | 29 | 2 | 34 | 3 | — | | 219 | 12 |
| Bahia | 2025 | Série A | 22 | 5 | 8 | 1 | 4 | 1 | 7 (Note: Six appearances in Copa Libertadores, one appearance in Copa Sudamericana) | 0 | 7 (Note: Appearance(s) in Copa do Nordeste) | 1 | 48 | 8 |
| Bahia | 2026 | Série A | 27 | 2 | 9 | 1 | 2 | 0 | 1 | 0 | — | | 39 | 3 |
| Bahia | Total | | 49 | 7 | 17 | 2 | 6 | 1 | 8 | 0 | 7 | 1 | 97 | 11 |
| Career total | | | 164 | 11 | 58 | 5 | 35 | 3 | 42 | 3 | 7 | 1 | 316 | 23 |

== Honours ==
São Paulo

- Copa do Brasil: 2023
- Campeonato Paulista: 2021

Bahia

- Campeonato Baiano: 2025, 2026
- Copa do Nordeste: 2025

São Paulo U20

- Taça Belo Horizonte de Juniores: 2016, 2017
- Copa do Brasil Sub-20: 2018
- Supercopa do Brasil Sub-20: 2018
- Copa São Paulo de Futebol Júnior: 2019

Brazil U17

- South American U-17 Championship: 2017
