= Young (footballer) =

Brazilian footballer (born 2002)

Personal information
- Full name: Young Navarro Moraes
- Date of birth: 7 March 2002 (age 24)
- Place of birth: Catanduva, Brazil
- Height: 2.02 m (6 ft 8 in)
- Position: Goalkeeper

Team information
- Current team: São Paulo
- Number: 50

Youth career
- 2016–2017: Desportivo Brasil
- 2017–2022: São Paulo

Senior career*
Years	Team	Apps	(Gls)
2021–	São Paulo	3	(0)
- * Club domestic league appearances and goals as of 30 November 2025

Young Navarro Moraes (born 7 March 2002), simply known as Young or Young Moraes, is a Brazilian professional footballer who plays as a goalkeeper for Campeonato Brasileiro Série A club São Paulo.

== Career ==
Young Moraes started his career with Desportivo Brasil youth team in 2016. He started playing for São Paulo in 2017 while still an under-15 athlete. In 2019, he was the star of the under-17 side that won the state title that season. With an impressive height of 2.01 m, he was the highest ever recorded athlete for São Paulo FC in that season.

In 2021 he joined the professional squad and was put on List B for the 2021 Campeonato Paulista. He became part of the title campaign in that season. In 2022 he was the starting goalkeeper for São Paulo in the Copa São Paulo de Futebol Jr. São Paulo reached the semi-finals in that season.

Young established himself as the club's third goalkeeper even after Rafael arrived in 2023. His contract was renewed until December 2026.

== Career statistics ==
As of 30 November 2025

Club	Season	League			State league		Copa do Brasil		Continental		Total	
Club	Season	Division	Apps	Goals	Apps	Goals	Apps	Goals	Apps	Goals	Apps	Goals
São Paulo	2021	Série A	0	0	0	0	0	0	0	0	0	0
São Paulo	2022	Série A	0	0	0	0	0	0	0	0	0	0
São Paulo	2023	Série A	0	0	0	0	0	0	0	0	0	0
São Paulo	2024	Série A	0	0	0	0	0	0	0	0	0	0
São Paulo	2025	Série A	3	0	0	0	0	0	0	0	3	0
Career total			3	0	0	0	0	0	0	0	3	0

== Honours ==
São Paulo

- Campeonato Paulista: 2021
- Copa do Brasil: 2023

São Paulo U17

- Campeonato Paulista Sub-17: 2019
