= Nathan Mendes =

Brazilian footballer

Personal information
- Full name: Nathan Gabriel de Souza Mendes
- Date of birth: 19 August 2002 (age 24)
- Place of birth: Caçapava, Brazil
- Height: 1.81 m (5 ft 11 in)
- Position: Right-back

Team information
- Current team: Vitória (on loan from Red Bull Bragantino)
- Number: 45

Youth career
- 2018: América de Teófilo Otoni
- 2019–2022: São Paulo

Senior career*
Years	Team	Apps	(Gls)
2021–2023	São Paulo	28	(1)
2022–2023	→ Coritiba (loan)	14	(0)
2024–	Red Bull Bragantino	44	(1)
2026–	→ Vitória (loan)	10	(0)
- * Club domestic league appearances and goals as of 8 April 2026

Nathan Gabriel de Souza Mendes (born 19 August 2002), known as Nathan Mendes or just Nathan, is a Brazilian professional footballer who plays as a right-back for Vitória, on loan from Red Bull Bragantino.

== Career statistics ==
As of match played 7 December 2025

Appearances and goals by club, season and competition
Club	Season	League			State league (Note: Includes Campeonato Paulista, Campeonato Paranaense)		Copa do Brasil		Continetnal		Other		Total	
Club	Season	Division	Apps	Goals	Apps	Goals	Apps	Goals	Apps	Goals	Apps	Goals	Apps	Goals
São Paulo	2021	Série A	0	0	0	0	1	0	0	0	—		1	0
São Paulo	2022	Série A	0	0	1	0	0	0	0	0	—		1	0
São Paulo	2023	Série A	21	1	6	0	2	0	3 (Note: Appearance(s) in Copa Sudamericana)	0	—		32	1
São Paulo	Total		21	1	7	0	3	0	3	0	0	0	34	1
Coritiba (loan)	2022	Série A	10	0	0	0	0	0	—		—		10	0
Coritiba (loan)	2023	Série A	0	0	4	0	0	0	—		—		4	0
Coritiba (loan)	Total		10	0	4	0	0	0	0	0	0	0	14	0
Red Bull Bragantino	2024	Série A	16	0	9	1	4	0	14 (Note: Four appearances in Copa Libertadores, ten appearances in Copa Sudamericana)	0	—		43	1
Red Bull Bragantino	2025	Série A	19	0	0	0	2	0	0	0	—		21	0
Red Bull Bragantino	Total		35	0	9	1	6	0	14	0	0	0	64	1
Career total			66	1	20	1	9	0	17	0	0	0	112	2

== Honours ==
São Paulo

- Copa do Brasil: 2023
