= Jandrei =

Brazilian footballer

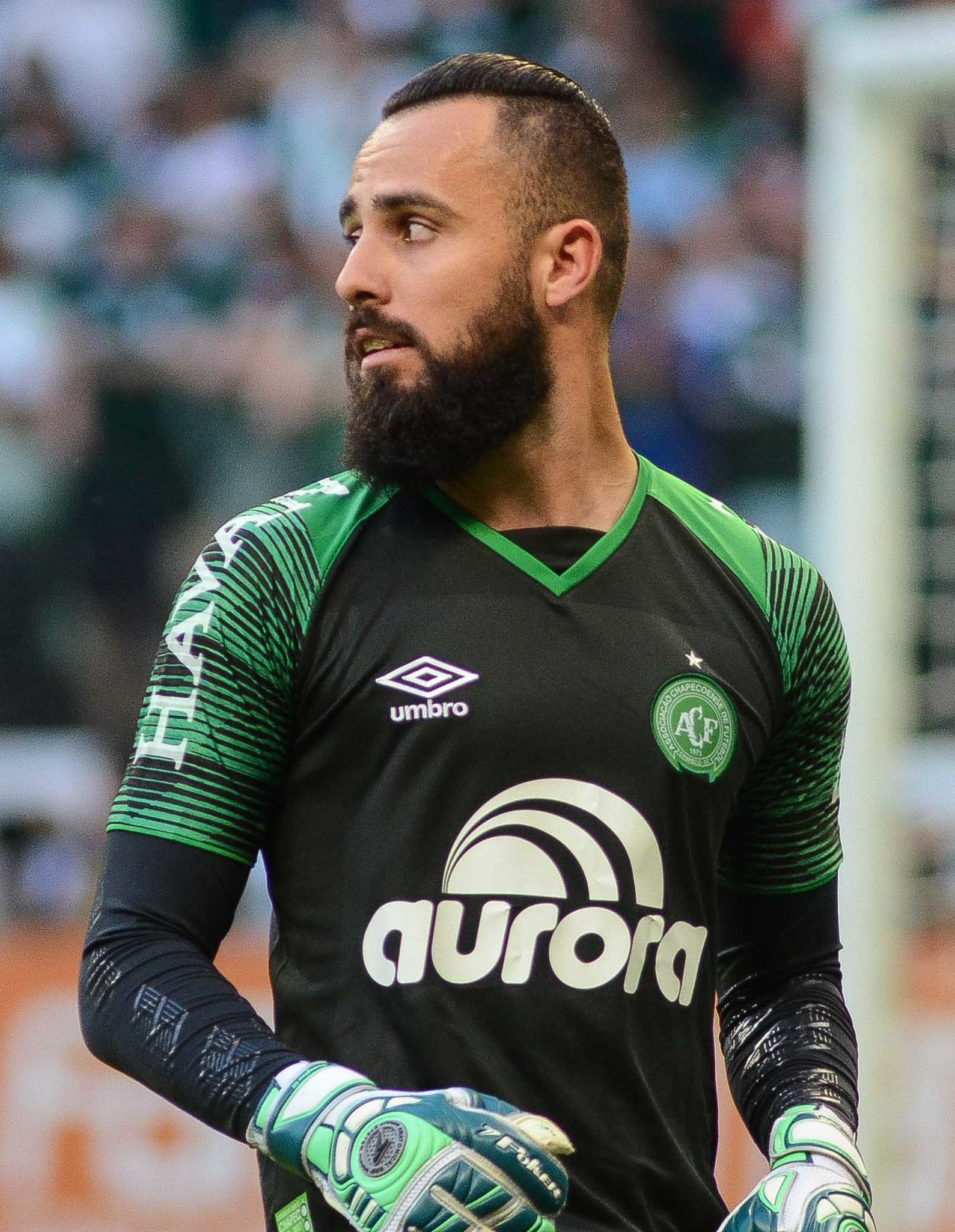
- Jandrei with Chapecoense in 2018

Personal information
- Full name: Jandrei Chitolina Carniel
- Date of birth: 1 March 1993 (age 33)
- Place of birth: Itaqui, Brazil
- Height: 1.87 m (6 ft 2 in)
- Position: Goalkeeper

Team information
- Current team: Juventude (on loan from São Paulo)
- Number: 93

Youth career
- 2006–2014: Internacional

Senior career*
Years	Team	Apps	(Gls)
2014–2016	Novo Hamburgo	10	(0)
2016–2017	Atlético Tubarão	20	(0)
2017	→ Chapecoense (loan)	34	(0)
2017–2018	Chapecoense	58	(0)
2019–2021	Genoa	1	(0)
2020–2021	→ Athletico Paranaense (loan)	6	(0)
2021	Santos	1	(0)
2022–	São Paulo	54	(0)
2025–	→ Juventude (loan)	63	(0)
- * Club domestic league appearances and goals as of 16 November 2026

Jandrei Chitolina Carniel (born 1 March 1993), simply known as Jandrei, is a Brazilian professional footballer who plays as a goalkeeper for Campeonato Brasileiro Série B club Juventude, on loan from São Paulo.

== Club career ==
=== Early career ===
Born in Itaqui, Rio Grande do Sul, Jandrei was an Internacional youth graduate. He left the club in September 2014 without making any senior appearances, and joined Novo Hamburgo.

Jandrei made his Campeonato Gaúcho debut on 11 February 2015, coming on as a first-half substitute for Thiago Humberto in a 1–0 home win against União Frederiquense, as starter Rafael dal Ri was sent off. He appeared in four matches during the tournament, two as a starter.

In May 2016, Jandrei moved to Atlético Tubarão in the second tier of Campeonato Catarinense. He was a regular starter for the club, contributing with 13 appearances as his side achieved promotion back to the first division.

=== Chapecoense ===
On 1 March 2017, Jandrei signed a loan contract with Série A club Chapecoense, with a buyout clause. Initially a third choice behind Artur Moraes and Elias, he made his debut in the top tier on 13 May, starting in a 1–1 away draw against Corinthians.

Jandrei made his Copa Libertadores debut on 17 May 2017, starting in a 2–1 away win against Lanús. He immediately became first-choice after his arrival, overtaking both Artur and Elias.

On 15 November 2017, Jandrei was bought outright for a fee of R$350,000, and renewed his contract until 2021.

=== Genoa ===
On 6 January 2019, Jandrei signed with Italian Serie A club Genoa. He made his debut abroad on 9 March, starting in a 0–1 loss at Parma, but spent the campaign as a backup to Ionuț Radu.

After falling further down the pecking order after the arrival of Mattia Perin, Jandrei was loaned out to Athletico Paranaense back in his home country on 13 February 2020, until June 2021. He was mainly a second-choice behind regular starter Santos, and terminated his contract with his parent club on 23 August 2021.

=== Santos ===
On 25 August 2021, Jandrei agreed to a short-term deal with Santos. He made his club debut on 17 October, starting in a 0–0 away draw against Sport Recife.

=== São Paulo ===
On 20 December 2021, Jandrei agreed to a two-year contract with São Paulo, effective as of the following January.

== Career statistics ==
As of match played 7 December 2025

Appearances and goals by club, season and competition
Club	Season	League			State League		Cup		Continental		Other		Total	
Club	Season	Division	Apps	Goals	Apps	Goals	Apps	Goals	Apps	Goals	Apps	Goals	Apps	Goals
Novo Hamburgo	2014	Gaúcho	—		0	0	—		—		1 (Note: Appearance(s) in Supercopa Gaúcha)	0	1	0
Novo Hamburgo	2015	Gaúcho	—		4	0	—		—		9 (Note: Five appearances in Copa FGF, four appearances in Supercopa Gaúcha)	0	13	0
Novo Hamburgo	2016	Gaúcho	—		6	0	—		—		—		6	0
Novo Hamburgo	Total		—		10	0	—		—		10	0	20	0
Atlético Tubarão	2016	Catarinense Série B	—		13	0	—		—		—		13	0
Atlético Tubarão	2017	Catarinense	—		7	0	—		—		—		7	0
Atlético Tubarão	Total		—		20	0	—		—		—		20	0
Chapecoense	2017	Série A	38	0	—		1	0	6 (Note: Two appearances in Copa Libertadores, four appearances in Copa Sudamericana)	0	1 (Note: Appearance(s) in Suruga Bank Championship)	0	46	0
Chapecoense	2018	Série A	38	0	16	0	0	0	2 (Note: Appearance(s) in Copa Libertadores)	0	—		56	0
Chapecoense	Total		76	0	16	0	1	0	8	0	1	0	102	0
Genoa	2018–19	Serie A	1	0	—		0	0	—		—		1	0
Genoa	2019–20	Serie A	0	0	—		1	0	—		—		1	0
Genoa	Total		1	0	—		1	0	—		—		2	0
Athletico Paranaense	2020	Série A	4	0	1	0	0	0	2	0	0	0	7	0
Santos	2021	Série A	1	0	—		—		—		—		1	0
São Paulo	2022	Série A	19	0	11	0	9	0	4	0	—		43	0
São Paulo	2023	Série A	5	0	0	0	0	0	0	0	—		5	0
São Paulo	2024	Série A	13	0	2	0	2	0	0	0	0	0	17	0
São Paulo	2025	Série A	0	0	2	0	3	0	0	0	—		5	0
São Paulo	Total		37	0	15	0	14	0	4	0	—		70	0
Juventude (loan)	2025	Série A	19	0	—		—		—		—		19	0
Career total			138	0	62	0	16	0	14	0	11	0	278	0

== Honours ==
Athletico Paranaense

- Campeonato Paranaense: 2020

São Paulo

- Copa do Brasil: 2023
- Supercopa do Brasil: 2024
