= Diego Costa (footballer, born 1999) =

Brazilian footballer

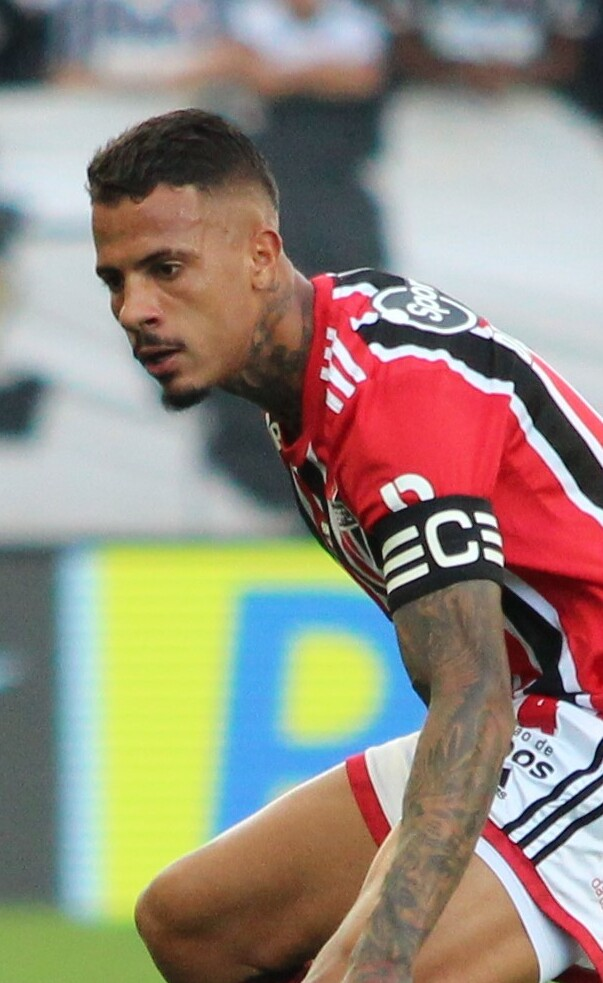
- Costa in 2022

Personal information
- Full name: Diego Henrique Costa Barbosa
- Date of birth: 21 July 1999 (age 27)
- Place of birth: Campo Grande, Brazil
- Height: 1.84 m (6 ft 0 in)
- Position: Centre-back

Team information
- Current team: PAOK (on loan from Krasnodar)
- Number: 19

Youth career
- 2014: Grêmio Prudente
- 2015–2019: São Paulo

Senior career*
Years	Team	Apps	(Gls)
2019–2024	São Paulo	107	(3)
2024–	Krasnodar	56	(4)
2026–	→ PAOK (loan)	1	(0)
- * Club domestic league appearances and goals as of 13 September 2026

Diego Henrique Costa Barbosa (born 21 July 1999) is a Brazilian professional footballer who plays as a centre-back for Super League Greece club PAOK on loan from Krasnodar.

== Career ==
Costa is a product of the youth academy of Grêmio Desportivo Prudente, before moving to São Paulo in 2015. He made his professional debut with São Paulo in a 2-1 Campeonato Brasileiro Série A win over CSA on 8 December 2019. In 2022, he had a strong season with the club and was named captain. He was instrumental in their winning campaign for the 2023 Copa do Brasil.

On 17 July 2024, Diego Costa signed a five-year contract with Krasnodar in Russia.

On 5 September 2026, he was loaned to PAOK in Greece for the remainder of the 2026–27 season.

== Career statistics ==
As of match played 1 September 2026

Appearances and goals by club, season and competition
Club	Season	League			State league (Note: Includes Campeonato Paulista)		National cup (Note: Includes Copa do Brasil, Russian Cup)		Continental		Other		Total	
Club	Season	Division	Apps	Goals	Apps	Goals	Apps	Goals	Apps	Goals	Apps	Goals	Apps	Goals
São Paulo	2019	Série A	1	0	0	0	0	0	0	0	—		0	0
São Paulo	2020	Série A	19	1	2	0	4	0	5 (Note: Three appearances in Copa Libertadores, two appearances in Copa Sudamericana)	1	—		30	2
São Paulo	2021	Série A	12	0	3	0	1	0	4 (Note: Appearances in Copa Libertadores)	0	—		20	0
São Paulo	2022	Série A	21	1	12	0	9	1	7 (Note: Appearances in Copa Sudamericana)	0	—		49	2
São Paulo	2023	Série A	23	0	0	0	6	0	2	0	—		31	0
São Paulo	2024	Série A	14	0	10	1	2	0	3	0	1 (Note: Appearance in Supercopa do Brasil)	1	30	1
São Paulo	Total		90	2	27	1	22	1	21	1	1	0	161	5
Krasnodar	2024–25	Russian Premier League	28	1	—		4	0	—		—		32	1
Krasnodar	2025–26	Russian Premier League	27	3	—		9	0	—		1 (Note: Appearance in Russian Super Cup)	0	37	3
Krasnodar	2026–27	Russian Premier League	1	0	—		2	0	—		—		3	0
Krasnodar	Total		56	4	—		15	0	—		1	0	72	4
Career total			146	6	27	1	37	1	21	1	2	0	233	9

== Honours ==
São Paulo U20

- Copa São Paulo de Futebol Júnior: 2019

São Paulo

- Copa do Brasil: 2023
- Supercopa do Brasil: 2024
- Campeonato Paulista: 2021

Krasnodar

- Russian Premier League: 2024–25
