= Gabriel Neves =

Uruguayan footballer (born 1997)

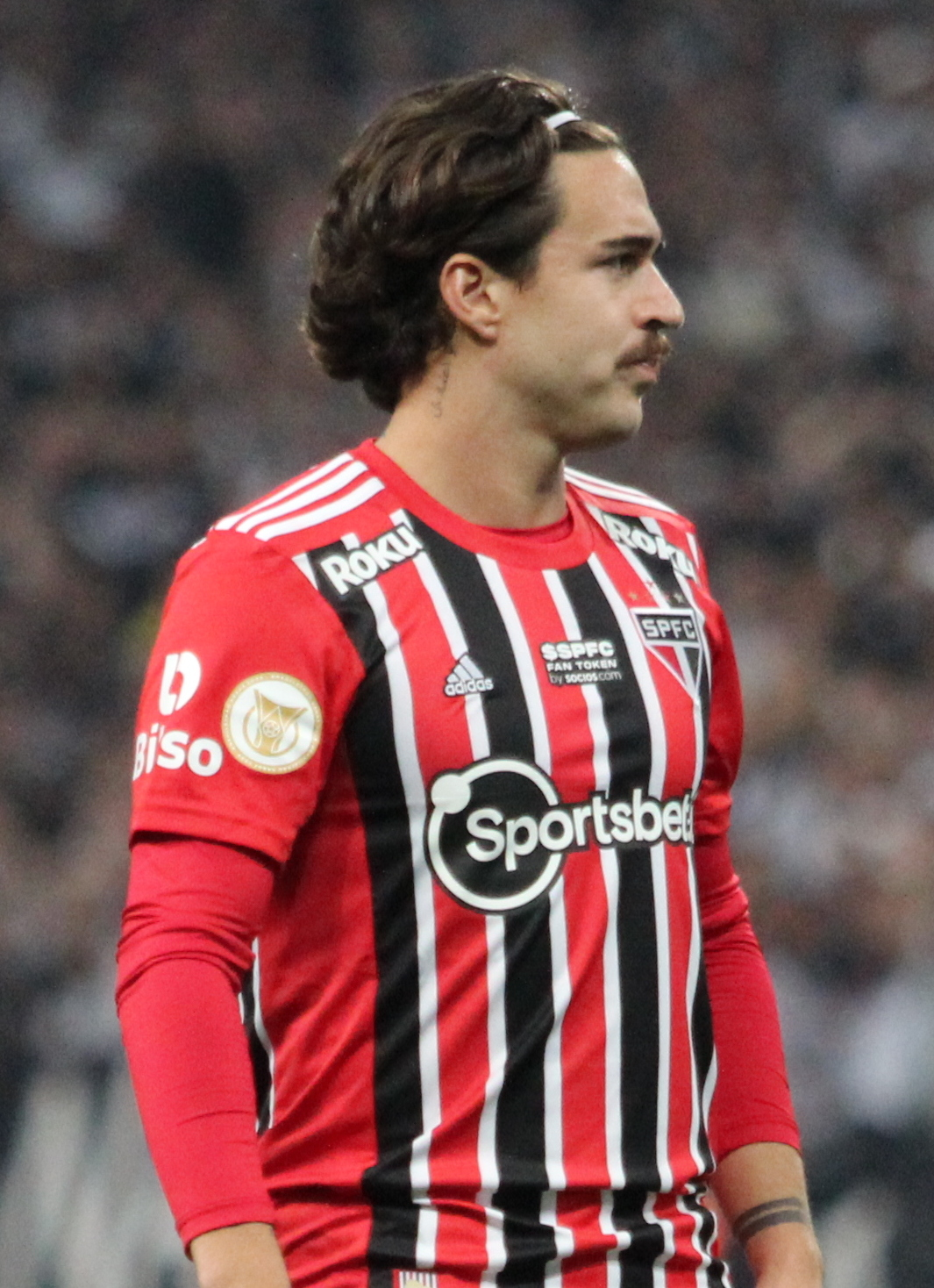
- Neves with São Paulo in 2022

Personal information
- Full name: Gabriel Neves Perdomo
- Date of birth: 11 August 1997 (age 29)
- Place of birth: Maldonado, Uruguay
- Height: 1.71 m (5 ft 7 in)
- Position: Defensive midfielder

Team information
- Current team: Estudiantes
- Number: 8

Youth career
- Nacional

Senior career*
Years	Team	Apps	(Gls)
2018–2021	Nacional	70	(4)
2021–2024	São Paulo	49	(1)
2024	→ Independiente (loan)	15	(1)
2024–	Estudiantes	53	(2)

International career
2016	Uruguay U20	4	(0)
2020	Uruguay	1	(0)
- * Club domestic league appearances and goals as of 17:21, 21 November 2026 (UTC)

Gabriel Neves Perdomo (born 11 August 1997) is a Uruguayan professional footballer who plays as a defensive midfielder for Argentine club Estudiantes.

== Club career ==
=== Nacional ===
A youth academy graduate of Nacional, Neves made his professional debut on 3 February 2018 in a 4–2 win against Montevideo City Torque.

=== São Paulo ===
On 30 August 2021, Neves joined Campeonato Brasileiro Série A club São Paulo until December 2022.

== International career ==
On 9 November 2020, Neves received his first call-up to the Uruguay national team as a replacement for injured Federico Valverde. He made his debut four days later in a 3–0 win against Colombia.

== Career statistics ==
=== Club ===
As of 8 August 2021

Club	Season	League			Cup		Continental		Other		Total	
Club	Season	Division	Apps	Goals	Apps	Goals	Apps	Goals	Apps	Goals	Apps	Goals
Nacional	2018	Uruguayan Primera División	7	0	—		1 (Note: Appearance in Copa Sudamericana.)	0	—		8	0
Nacional	2019	Uruguayan Primera División	24	2	—		6 (Note: Appearances in Copa Libertadores.)	0	2 (Note: One appearance each in Supercopa Uruguaya and Championship play-off.)	0	32	2
Nacional	2020	Uruguayan Primera División	26	2	—		6	0	2 (Note: One appearance each in Torneo Apertura decider and Championship play-off.)	0	34	2
Nacional	2021	Uruguayan Primera División	12	0	—		4 (Note: Three appearances in Copa Libertadores and one appearance in Copa Sudamericana.)	0	—		16	0
Career total			69	4	0	0	17	0	4	0	90	4

=== International ===
As of 13 November 2020

Appearances and goals by national team and year
National team	Year	Apps	Goals
Uruguay	2020	1	0
Total		1	0

== Honours ==
Nacional

- Uruguayan Primera División: 2019, 2020
- Supercopa Uruguaya: 2019

São Paulo

- Copa do Brasil: 2023

Estudiantes

- Trofeo de Campeones de la Liga Profesional: 2024, 2025
- Primera División: 2025 Clausura
