= Gabriel Maioli =

Brazilian footballer (born 2003)

Personal information
- Full name: Gabriel Maioli da Silva
- Date of birth: 2 February 2003 (age 23)
- Place of birth: São Paulo, Brazil
- Height: 1.77 m (5 ft 10 in)
- Position: Winger

Team information
- Current team: APOEL
- Number: 11

Youth career
- 2014: Grêmio Audax
- 2015–2023: São Paulo

Senior career*
Years	Team	Apps	(Gls)
2022–2023	São Paulo	0	(0)
2024–	APOEL	36	(6)
- * Club domestic league appearances and goals as of 8 September 2026

Gabriel Maioli da Silva (born 2 February 2003), known as Gabriel Maioli, is a Brazilian professional footballer who plays as a winger for Cypriot First Division club APOEL.

== Career ==
His talent was spotted in the youth program of São Paulo FC. Maioli made his professional debut on 25 May 2022, in the 2022 Copa Sudamericana against Ayacucho. On 31 January 2024, an announcement was made that Maioli's pass to APOEL FC was sold for around €1 million.

== Honours ==
APOEL

- Cypriot First Division: 2023–24
- Cypriot Super Cup: 2024
