= Luan (footballer, born 1999) =

Brazilian association football player

Personal information
- Full name: Luan Vinícius da Silva Santos
- Date of birth: 14 May 1999 (age 27)
- Place of birth: São Paulo, Brazil
- Height: 1.75 m (5 ft 9 in)
- Position: Defensive midfielder

Youth career
- 2010–2018: São Paulo

Senior career*
Years	Team	Apps	(Gls)
2018–2026	São Paulo	144	(4)
2024	→ Vitória (loan)	25	(0)

International career^{‡}
2017–2019	Brazil U20	12	(0)
- * Club domestic league appearances and goals as of 6 April 2026 ‡ National team caps and goals as of 17:24, 14 February 2019 (UTC)

Luan Vinícius da Silva Santos (born 14 May 1999), simply known as Luan, is a Brazilian professional footballer who plays as a defensive midfielder.

== Club career ==
Born in São Paulo, Luan joined the youth academy of São Paulo FC in 2010. On 20 July 2018, he was called to the senior team by manager Diego Aguirre as a replacement for the injured Jucilei. Two days later, he made his first team debut, coming on as a substitute for Edimar Fraga in a 3–1 victory over Corinthians.

On 29 July, Luan started for the first time (due to the suspension of Hudson) in a 2–0 win against Cruzeiro. On 23 October, he extended his contract until 2022.

In the 2020/21 season, Luan managed to win ownership with coach Fernando Diniz, and made good matches as defensive midfielder.

On 20 April 2021, Luan scores his first goal in his club career against Sporting Cristal, at the debut of São Paulo by Copa Libertadores 2021.

On 20 May 2021, Luan completed 100 games with the São Paulo FC, playing the final of the Campeonato Paulista against the rival Palmeiras. On 23 May 2021, Luan played the second game of the final and scored the first goal of São Paulo in the game. Later, he would win the trophy.

== International career ==
Luan has been capped by Brazil at under-20 level, captaining the side in a friendly against Chile. On 13 December 2018, he was included in the under-20 squad for the 2019 South American U-20 Championship.

== Career statistics ==
As of 6 March 2022.

Appearances and goals by club, season and competition
Club	Season	League			Cup		Continental		Other		Total	
Club	Season	Division	Apps	Goals	Apps	Goals	Apps	Goals	Apps	Goals	Apps	Goals
São Paulo	2018	Série A	7	0	0	0	0	0	0	0	7	0
São Paulo	2019	Série A	23	0	1	0	0	0	11	0	35	0
São Paulo	2020	Série A	30	0	6	0	3	0	3	0	42	0
São Paulo	2021	Série A	17	0	2	0	7	2	14	1	40	3
São Paulo	2022	Série A	0	0	0	0	0	0	0	0	0	0
Career total			77	0	9	0	10	2	28	1	124	3

== Honours ==
São Paulo

- Campeonato Paulista: 2021
- Copa do Brasil: 2023

Vitória

- Campeonato Baiano: 2024
