= Welington (footballer) =

Brazilian footballer (born 2001)

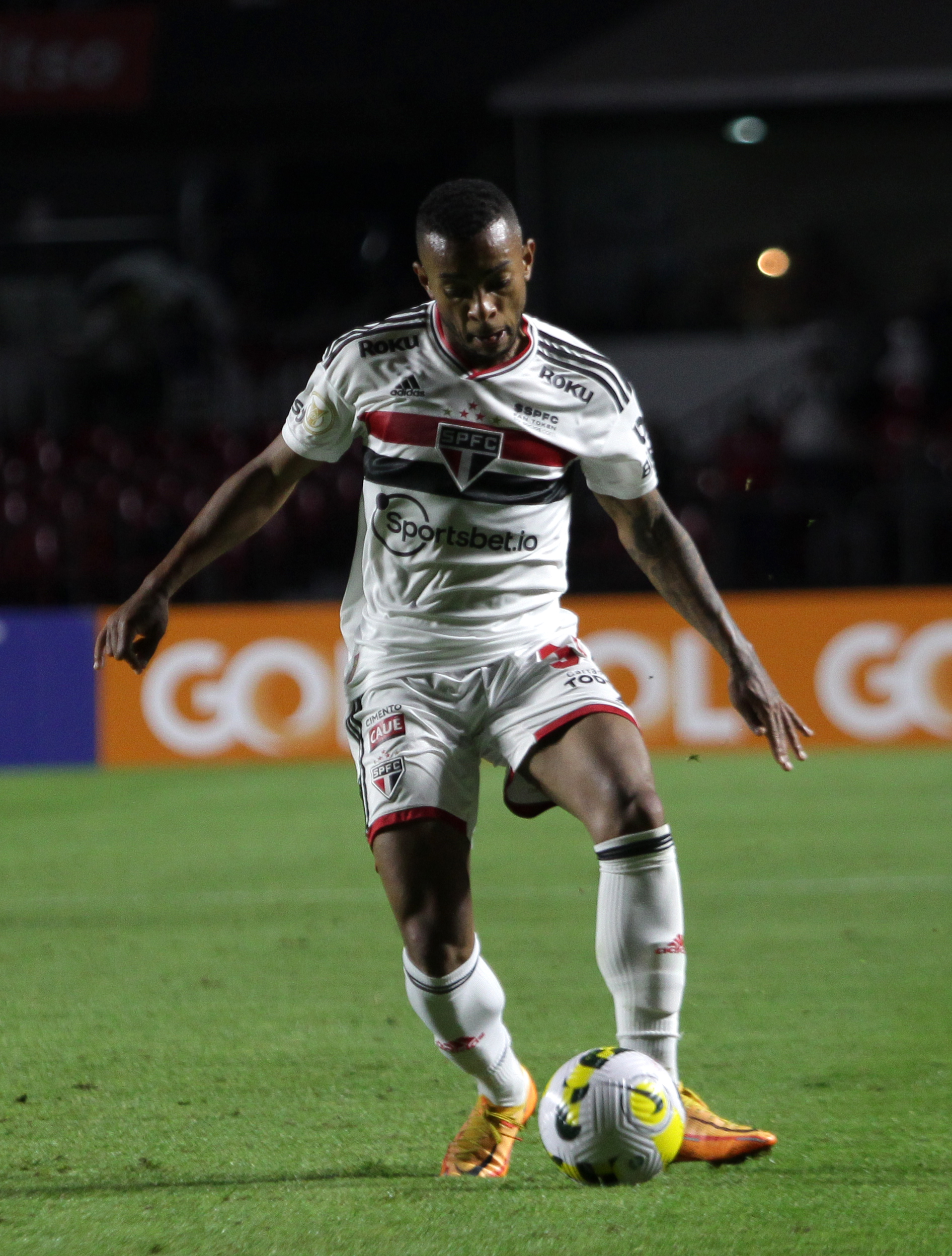
- Welington playing for São Paulo in 2022

Personal information
- Full name: Welington Damascena Santos
- Date of birth: 19 February 2001 (age 25)
- Place of birth: São Paulo, Brazil
- Height: 1.70 m (5 ft 7 in)
- Position: Left-back

Team information
- Current team: Southampton
- Number: 34

Youth career
- 2014–2020: São Paulo

Senior career*
Years	Team	Apps	(Gls)
2020–2024	São Paulo	125	(2)
2025–	Southampton	35	(2)

International career^{‡}
2023	Brazil U23	1	(0)
- * Club domestic league appearances and goals as of 17:44, 7 November 2026 (UTC) ‡ National team caps and goals as of 24 September 2023

Welington Damascena Santos (born 19 February 2001), known as Welington, is a Brazilian professional footballer who plays as a left-back for EFL Championship club Southampton.

== Club career ==
=== São Paulo ===
==== Early career ====
Welington played 26 matches for São Paulo under-15s, 37 matches in the under-17s and 107 matches in the under-20s. He won several trophies such as the 2018 Copa do Brasil U20 and the 2019 Copinha. In the latter, he was part of the squad who shaved his head in honour of a fan of the club who had brain cancer.

He was named in the professional team for the first time in December 2019 for the last match of the Brazilian Championship against CSA. São Paulo won 2–1, but Welington did not make his debut.

==== 2020 ====
Turning professional in 2020, he made his debut on 8 March 2020, in a 1–0 defeat to Botafogo de Ribeirão Preto in the Campeonato Paulista. He came on in the second half in place of Everton and suffered a fall in a head collision, but he remained on the field until the end of the match and was later taken to hospital.

==== 2021 ====
On 14 April, he scored his first goal as a professional in a 3–2 victory over Guarani in the Campeonato Paulista. He was part of the Paulista winning squad on 23 May which won 2–0 against Palmeiras but was an unused substitute. On 3 June, Welington renewed his contract until 31 December 2024.

==== 2022 ====
On 27 March, he scored the first goal in a 2–1 victory over Corinthians in the semi-finals of the Campeonato Paulista, helping São Paulo reach their second consecutive final. On 3 April, Welington was a starter in the final, but ended up being beaten 4–0 by Palmeiras.

==== 2023 ====
Previously wearing the number 34 shirt, he started using the number six shirt after Reinaldo's departure. After an injury suffered against Botafogo-SP in the Campeonato Paulista, he was injured again more seriously on 13 March in a match against Água Santa, where he underwent ligament surgery on his left ankle. After four months, he returned to training on the field for the first time in June. On 19 August, Welington played his hundredth match for the club in the goalless draw with Botafogo.

==== 2024 ====
On 4 February, he was part of the winning squad for the Supercopa Rei final against Palmeiras which ended 4–2 on penalties, after a goalless draw in normal time.

=== Southampton ===
On 26 July 2024, Welington signed a pre-contract with Premier League side Southampton, and he formally joined on 1 January 2025 following the expiry of his contract with São Paulo in December 2024. On 1 February 2025, Welington made his debut for the club in a 2–1 away victory against Ipswich Town.

During a 2–1 home defeat against Stoke City on 23 August 2025, Welington picked up an ankle injury, with manager Will Still later confirming he was expected to be sidelined for "a couple of months". On 25 October, he received a red card during a 2–1 away defeat against Blackburn Rovers for elbowing Andri Guðjohnsen and was suspended for three matches.

On 5 September 2026, Welington scored his first goal for the club in a 1–1 draw against Lincoln City.

== Career statistics ==
As of 7 November 2026

Club	Season	League			State league		Domestic cup (Note: Includes Copa de Brasil, FA Cup)		League cup (Note: Includes EFL Cup)		Continental		Other		Total	
Club	Season	Division	Apps	Goals	Goals	Apps	Apps	Goals	Apps	Goals	Apps	Goals	Apps	Goals	Apps	Goals
São Paulo	2020	Série A	1	0	1 (Note: Appearances in the Campeonato Paulista)	0	0	0	—		0	0	0	0	2	0
São Paulo	2021	Série A	16	0	6	1	3	0	—		6	0	0	0	31	1
São Paulo	2022	Série A	32	0	8	1	6	0	—		5	0	0	0	51	1
São Paulo	2023	Série A	16	0	10	0	3	0	—		3	0	0	0	32	0
São Paulo	2024	Série A	22	0	13	0	4	0	—		8	0	1 (Note: Appearance in Supercopa do Brasil)	0	48	0
São Paulo	Total		87	0	38	2	16	0	—		22	0	1	0	164	2
Southampton	2024–25	Premier League	10	0	—		1	0	0	0	—		—		11	0
Southampton	2025–26	Championship	18	0	—		2	0	0	0	—		1 (Note: Appearance in EFL Championship play-offs)	0	21	0
Southampton	2026–27	Championship	7	2	—		0	0	1	0	—		—		8	2
Southampton	Total		35	2	—		3	0	1	0	—		1	0	40	2
Career total			122	2	38	2	19	0	1	0	22	0	2	0	204	4

== Honours ==
São Paulo

- Copa São Paulo de Futebol Jr.: 2019
- Campeonato Paulista: 2021
- Copa do Brasil: 2023
- Supercopa do Brasil: 2024
