= 2018 São Paulo FC season =

São Paulo
2018 season
- Chairman: Carlos Augusto de Barros e Silva (Leco)
- Manager: Dorival Júnior (until 9 March); Diego Aguirre (until 11 November); André Jardine (Interim coach)
- Stadium: Estádio do Morumbi
- Série A: 5th
- Campeonato Paulista: Semi-finals
- Copa Sudamericana: Second Stage
- Copa do Brasil: Fourth round
- Top goalscorer: League: Diego Souza (12 goals); All: Diego Souza (16 goals)
- Highest home attendance: 58,624 (vs. Corinthians – July 21)
- Lowest home attendance: 8,514 (vs. CRB – February 28)
- Average home league attendance: 37,629
Home colours	Away colours

The 2018 season was São Paulo's 89th year since the club's existence. Due previous year playing for remaining in first division of national league, the club started his performance at state league, Campeonato Paulista, mistrusted by his own fans and media. The head coach Dorival Júnior was fired after 5 losses in only 14 matches, being defeated by all main rivals in just a month. To replace Dorival, São Paulo selected the Uruguayan Diego Aguirre, a former forward who was in the club for a short period of time in 1990. Despite the elimination in the semifinals of Campeonato Paulista and second round of Copa Sudamericana, Aguirre did a consistent job in the early months leading the team. In the first half of league São Paulo ended in first place holding its performance for 8 rounds at the middle of competition. However a couple of draws and the rise of his rival Palmeiras, took place from São Paulo that dropped down in table 4 positions finishing his participation in 5th. Diego Aguirre was fired in the 33rd round after an away draw against Corinthians by 1-1. For the interim charge André Jardine trained the club in the last 5 matches, he was announced as the head coach for 2019.

== Players ==
=== Current squad ===
As of 31 August 2018

Note: Flags indicate national team as defined under FIFA eligibility rules; some limited exceptions apply. Players may hold more than one non-FIFA nationality.

No.	Pos.	Nation	Player
1	GK	BRA	Jean
3	DF	BRA	Rodrigo Caio
4	DF	BRA	Anderson Martins
5	DF	ECU	Robert Arboleda
7	FW	COL	Santiago Tréllez
8	MF	BRA	Jucilei
9	FW	BRA	Diego Souza
10	MF	BRA	Nenê
11	MF	ECU	Joao Rojas
12	GK	BRA	Sidão
14	DF	BRA	Reinaldo
15	DF	BRA	Bruno Peres (on loan from Roma)
16	DF	BRA	Edimar
18	MF	BRA	Everton Felipe
19	FW	URU	Gonzalo Carneiro

No.	Pos.	Nation	Player
20	MF	BRA	Shaylon
22	MF	BRA	Everton
25	MF	BRA	Hudson (captain)
26	MF	BRA	Igor Gomes
27	MF	BRA	Luan Santos
28	MF	BRA	Felipe Araruna
30	FW	BRA	Brenner
31	MF	BRA	Liziero
34	DF	BRA	Bruno Alves
36	FW	BRA	Caíque
37	MF	BRA	Helinho
39	MF	BRA	Antony
40	GK	BRA	Lucas Perri
41	GK	BRA	Lucas Paes

=== Transfers ===
==== In ====
Pos.	Player	Transferred from	Fee/notes	Date	Source
DF	(Brazil) Reinaldo	(Brazil) Chapecoense	Loan Return	December 31, 2017	
MF	(Brazil) Hudson	(Brazil) Cruzeiro	Loan Return	December 31, 2017	
GK	(Brazil) Jean	(Brazil) Bahia	R$6,500,000	January 1, 2018	
MF	(Brazil) Diego Souza	(Brazil) Sport Recife	R$10,900,000.	January 7, 2018	
DF	(Brazil) Anderson Martins	(Brazil) Vasco da Gama	Sign.	January 10, 2018	
MF	(Brazil) Nenê	(Brazil) Vasco da Gama	Sign	January 29, 2018	
FW	(Colombia) Santiago Tréllez	(Brazil) Vitória	R$6,800,000	January 29, 2018	
MF	(Brazil) Valdívia	(Brazil) Internacional	Loan.	February 7, 2018	
DF	(Brazil) Régis	(Brazil) São Bento	Sign.	March 15, 2018	
MF	(Brazil) Liziero	Youth team	Sign.	January 1, 2018	
FW	(Uruguay) Gonzalo Carneiro	(Uruguay) Defensor Sporting	R$2,800,000	January 15, 2018	
MF	(Brazil) Éverton	(Brazil) Flamengo	R$15,600,000	April 17, 2018	

==== Out ====
Note: Flags indicate national team as defined under FIFA eligibility rules; some limited exceptions apply. Players may hold more than one non-FIFA nationality.

No.	Pos.	Nation	Player
1	GK	BRA	Denis (end of contract)
5	DF	URU	Diego Lugano (retired)
17	FW	BRA	Gilberto (end of contract)
41	FW	BRA	Denílson (return to Granada)
39	FW	BRA	Marcinho (return to São Bernardo)

No.	Pos.	Nation	Player
30	GK	BRA	Renan Ribeiro (to Estoril Praia)
18	DF	ARG	Julio Buffarini (to Boca Juniors)
15	MF	BRA	Hernanes (return to Hebei Fortune)
9	FW	ARG	Lucas Pratto (to River Plate)

=== Out on loan ===
Note: Flags indicate national team as defined under FIFA eligibility rules; some limited exceptions apply. Players may hold more than one non-FIFA nationality.

No.	Pos.	Nation	Player
—	DF	BRA	Hugo Gomes (on loan to Atlético Goianiense)
—	DF	BRA	Lucas Kal (on loan to Guarani)
—	DF	BRA	Foguete (on loan to Santo André)
—	DF	BRA	Lucão (on loan to Estoril)
—	DF	BRA	Iago Maidana (on loan to Atlético Mineiro)
—	DF	BRA	Vítor Tormena (on loan to Gil Vicente)
—	DF	BRA	Matheus Reis (on loan to Moreirense)
—	DF	BRA	Douglas (on loan to Chapecoense)
—	DF	BRA	Auro Jr. (on loan to Toronto FC)
—	DF	BRA	Rony (on loan to CSA)
—	MF	ARG	Jonathan Gómez (on loan to Al-Fayha)

No.	Pos.	Nation	Player
—	MF	BRA	Maicosuel (on loan to Grêmio)
—	MF	BRA	Matheus Banguelê (on loan to Internacional Sub-23)
—	MF	BRA	Daniel (on loan to Ponte Preta)
—	MF	BRA	Pedro Augusto (on loan to São Bento)
—	MF	BRA	Roni (on loan to Belenenses)
—	MF	BRA	Thomaz (on loan to Red Bull Brasil)
—	FW	BRA	Joanderson (on loan to Internacional)
—	FW	BRA	Léo Natel (on loan to Fortaleza)
—	FW	BRA	João Paulo (on loan to Criciúma)
—	FW	BRA	Pedro Bortoluzo (on loan to Guarani)
—	FW	BRA	Gabriel Rodrigues (on loan to Caxias do Sul)

== Statistics ==
=== Top scorers ===
Rank	Nat	Pos	Player	Campeonato Paulista	Copa do Brasil	Copa Sudamericana	Campeonato Brasileiro	Total
1	(Brazil)	FW	Diego Souza	3	0	1	12	16
2	(Brazil)	MF	Nenê	2	2	0	8	12
3	(Colombia)	FW	Santiago Tréllez	1	1	0	4	6
4	(Brazil)	FW	Éverton	0	0	0	5	5
5	(Brazil)	FW	Marcos Guilherme	2	1	0	1	4
6	(Brazil)	FW	Brenner	1	1	0	1	3
=	(Peru)	MF	Christian Cueva	2	1	0	0	3
=	(Brazil)	DF	Reinaldo	1	0	0	2	3
=	(Brazil)	MF	Valdívia	0	3	0	0	3
7	(Brazil)	DF	Bruno Alves	0	0	0	2	2
=	(Brazil)	DF	Éder Militão	0	1	0	1	2
=	(Brazil)	MF	Liziero	0	0	1	1	2
=	(Brazil)	DF	Rodrigo Caio	1	1	0	0	2
=	(Brazil)	MF	Shaylon	0	0	0	2	2
8	(Brazil)	DF	Anderson Martins	0	0	0	1	1
=	(Brazil)	DF	Bruno Peres	0	0	0	1	1
=	(Uruguay)	FW	Gonzalo Carneiro	0	0	0	1	1
=	(Brazil)	MF	Helinho	0	0	0	1	1
=	(Brazil)	MF	Hudson	0	0	0	1	1
=	(Ecuador)	MF	Joao Rojas	0	0	0	1	1
=	(Ecuador)	DF	Robert Arboleda	1	0	0	0	1
			Own goals	1	0	0	1	2
Total				15	11	2	46	74

=== Managers performance ===
Name	Nationality	From	To	P	W	D	L	GF	GA	%
Dorival Júnior	Brazil	17 January	9 March	14	7	2	5	14	10	55%
André Jardine (caretaker)	Brazil	11 March	14 March	2	2	0	0	6	1	100%
Diego Aguirre	Uruguay	17 March	11 November	44	20	14	10	52	37	56%
André Jardine (caretaker)	Brazil	15 November	2 December	5	1	2	2	2	4	33%

=== Overview ===
Competition	First match	Last match	Starting round	Final position	Record							
Competition	First match	Last match	Starting round	Final position	Pld	W	D	L	GF	GA	GD	Win %
Série A	16 April 2018	2 December 2018	Matchday 1	5th	38	16	15	7	46	34	+12	42.11
Copa do Brasil	31 January 2018	19 April 2018	First Stage	Fourth Stage	6	4	1	1	11	4	+7	66.67
Campeonato Paulista	17 January 2018	28 March 2018	Matchday 1	Semi-Finals	16	7	2	7	15	13	+2	43.75
Copa Sudamericana	12 April 2018	16 August 2018	First Stage	Second Stage	4	2	1	1	2	1	+1	50.00
Total					64	29	19	16	74	52	+22	45.31

Source: Competitions

Games played	64 (16 Campeonato Paulista, 6 Copa do Brasil, 4 Copa Sudamericana, 38 Campeonato Brasileiro)
Games won	29 (7 Campeonato Paulista, 4 Copa do Brasil, 2 Copa Sudamericana, 16 Campeonato Brasileiro)
Games drawn	19 (2 Campeonato Paulista, 1 Copa do Brasil, 1 Copa Sudamericana, 15 Campeonato Brasileiro)
Games lost	16 (7 Campeonato Paulista, 1 Copa do Brasil, 1 Copa Sudamericana, 7 Campeonato Brasileiro)
Goals scored	74
Goals conceded	52
Goal difference	+22
Best result	3−0 (A) v CRB − Copa do Brasil; 3−0 (H) v Vitória − Campeonato Brasileiro
Worst result	1−3 (A) v Palmeiras − Campeonato Brasileiro; 1−3 (A) v Internacional − Campeonato Brasileiro
Top scorer	Diego Souza (16)

Source: Competitions

== Official competitions ==
=== Group B ===
Pos	Team	Pld	W	D	L	GF	GA	GD	Pts	Qualification
1	São Paulo	12	5	2	5	12	11	+1	17	knockout stage
2	São Caetano	12	4	3	5	8	14	−6	15	knockout stage
3	Ponte Preta	12	2	6	4	6	8	−2	12	
4	Santo André	12	1	5	6	11	18	−7	8	

Source: Soccerway

==== First stage ====
17 January 1	São Bento	2–0	São Paulo	Sorocaba
19:30 UTC-02:00	Anderson Cavalo 68'; Maicon Souza 85'	Report		Stadium: Estádio Municipal Walter Ribeiro (Ninho da Garça); Attendance: 9,147; Referee: Flavio Rodrigues da Silva

20 January 2	São Paulo	0–0	Novorizontino	São Paulo
19:00 UTC-02:00		Report		Stadium: Estádio Cícero Pompeu de Toledo (Morumbi); Attendance: 17,171; Referee: Luiz Flávio de Oliveira

24 January 3	Mirassol	0–2	São Paulo	Mirassol
21:45 UTC-02:00		Report	Diego Souza 85'; Marcos Guilherme 89'	Stadium: Estádio Municipal José Maria de Campos Maia; Attendance: 7,663; Referee: Vinicius Furlan

27 January 4	Corinthians	2–1	São Paulo	São Paulo
17:00 UTC-02:00	Jádson 1'; Balbuena 32'	Report	Brenner 25'	Stadium: Estádio Municipal Paulo Machado de Carvalho (Pacaembu); Attendance: 34,358; Referee: Marcelo Aparecido Ribeiro de Souza

3 February 5	São Paulo	2–0	Botafogo	São Paulo
17:00 UTC-02:00	Diego Souza 55'; Cueva 83' (pen.)	Report		Stadium: Estádio Cícero Pompeu de Toledo (Morumbi); Attendance: 13,624; Referee: Raphael Claus

7 February 6	São Paulo	1–0	Bragantino	São Paulo
21:45 UTC-02:00	Nenê 5' (pen.)	Report		Stadium: Estádio Cícero Pompeu de Toledo (Morumbi); Attendance: 10,278; Referee: Adriano de Assis Miranda

18 February 7	São Paulo	0–1	Santos	São Paulo
17:00 UTC-03:00		Report	Gabriel 53'	Stadium: Estádio Cícero Pompeu de Toledo (Morumbi); Attendance: 36,118; Referee: Raphael Claus

21 February 8	Ituano	2–1	São Paulo	Itu
21:45 UTC-02:00	Ronaldo 22'; Alison 61'	Report	Cueva 51'	Stadium: Estádio Municipal Doutor Novelli Júnior; Attendance: 5,203; Referee: Leandro Bizzio Marinho

25 February 9	São Paulo	0–0	Ferroviária	São Paulo
17:00 UTC-03:00		Report		Stadium: Estádio Cícero Pompeu de Toledo (Morumbi); Attendance: 11,434; Referee: Marcelo Aparecido Ribeiro de Souza

4 March 10	Linense	1–2	São Paulo	Lins
19:30 UTC-03:00	Murilo 37'	Report	Reinaldo 42'; Rodrigo Caio 90+2'	Stadium: Estádio Municipal Gilberto Siqueira Lopes; Attendance: 4,367; Referee: Vinicius Gonçalves Dias Araújo

8 March 11	Palmeiras	2–0	São Paulo	São Paulo
20:30 UTC-03:00	Antônio Carlos 10'; Borja 32'	Report		Stadium: Allianz Parque; Attendance: 34,916; Referee: Flávio Rodrigues de Souza

11 March 12	São Paulo	3–1	Red Bull Brasil	São Paulo
17:00 UTC-03:00	Nininho 32' (o.g.); Arboleda 68'; Marcos Guilherme 72'	Report	Edmílson 9'	Stadium: Estádio Cícero Pompeu de Toledo (Morumbi); Attendance: 9,226; Referee: Leandro Bizzio Marinho

==== Quarterfinals ====
17 March First leg	São Caetano	1–0	São Paulo	São Caetano do Sul
16:00 UTC-03:00	Chiquinho 53'	Report		Stadium: Estádio Anacleto Campanella; Attendance: 5,224; Referee: Vinicius Furlan

20 March Second leg	São Paulo	2–0	São Caetano	São Paulo
21:00 UTC-03:00	Tréllez 63'; Diego Souza 84'	Report		Stadium: Estádio Cícero Pompeu de Toledo (Morumbi); Attendance: 17,899; Referee: Salim Fende Chavez

==== Semifinals ====
25 March First leg	São Paulo	1–0	Corinthians	São Paulo
16:00 UTC-03:00	Nenê 45+2'	Report		Stadium: Estádio Cícero Pompeu de Toledo (Morumbi); Attendance: 42,830; Referee: Raphael Claus

28 March Second leg	Corinthians	1–0 (5–4 p)	São Paulo	São Paulo
21:45 UTC-03:00	Rodriguinho 90+2'	Report		Stadium: Arena Corinthians; Attendance: 43,062; Referee: Vinicius Gonçalves Dias Araújo
	Penalties
	Mateus Vital (penalty scored); Rodriguinho (penalty missed); Clayson (penalty scored); Pedrinho (penalty scored); Maycon (penalty scored); Danilo (penalty scored)		(penalty missed) Diego Souza; (penalty scored) Lucas Fernandes; (penalty scored) Bruno Alves; (penalty scored) Reinaldo; (penalty scored) Éder Militão; (penalty missed) Liziero

=== Copa do Brasil ===
31 January First round	Madureira	0–1	São Paulo	Londrina
21:45 UTC-02:00		Report	Brenner 25'	Stadium: Estádio Municipal Jacy Scaff (do Café); Attendance: 4,455; Referee: Rafael Traci

15 February Second round	CSA	0–2	São Paulo	Maceió
21:45 UTC-02:00		Report	Nenê 48'; Cueva 61' (pen.)	Stadium: Estádio Rei Pelé (Trapichão); Attendance: 16,270; Referee: Braulio da Silva Machado

28 February Third round first leg	São Paulo	2–0	CRB	São Paulo
19:30 UTC-03:00	Valdívia 34'; Éder Militão 41'	Report		Stadium: Estádio Cícero Pompeu de Toledo (Morumbi); Attendance: 8,514; Referee: Leandro Pedro Vuaden

14 March Third round second leg	CRB	0–3 (0–5 agg.)	São Paulo	Maceió
19:30 UTC-03:00		Report	Marcos Guilherme 5'; Valdívia 47'; Rodrigo Caio 58'	Stadium: Estádio Rei Pelé (Trapichão); Attendance: 10,550; Referee: Marcelo de Lima Henrique

4 April Fourth stage first leg	Atlético Paranaense	2–1	São Paulo	Curitiba
21:45 UTC-03:00	Pablo 23'; Paulo André 61'	Report	Tréllez 63'	Stadium: Arena Joaquim Américo Guimarães (Arena da Baixada); Attendance: 24,545; Referee: Claudio Francisco Lima e Silva

19 April Fourth stage second leg	São Paulo	2–2 (3–4 agg.)	Atlético Paranaense	São Paulo
19:15 UTC-03:00	Valdívia 25'; Nenê 34'	Report	Guilherme 40' (pen.); Matheus Rossetto 51'	Stadium: Estádio Cícero Pompeu de Toledo (Morumbi); Attendance: 27,812; Referee: Wagner do Nascimento Magalhães

=== Copa Sudamericana ===
==== First stage ====
12 April First leg	Rosario Central (Argentina)	0–0	(Brazil) São Paulo	Rosario
21:30 UTC-03:00		Report		Stadium: Estadio Gigante de Arroyito; Attendance: 40,000; Referee: Victor Hugo Carrillo (Peru)

9 May Second leg	São Paulo (Brazil)	1–0	(Argentina) Rosario Central	São Paulo
21:45 UTC-03:00	Diego Souza 60'	Report		Stadium: Estádio Cícero Pompeu de Toledo (Morumbi); Attendance: 33,862; Referee: Eber Aquino (Paraguay)

==== Second stage ====
2 August First leg	São Paulo (Brazil)	0–1	(Argentina) Colón	São Paulo
19:30 UTC-03:00		Report	Fritzler 79'	Stadium: Estádio Cícero Pompeu de Toledo (Morumbi); Attendance: 35,666; Referee: Leodan González (Uruguay)

16 August Second leg	Colón (Argentina)	0–1 (5–3 p)	(Brazil) São Paulo	Santa Fe
21:45 UTC-03:00		Report	Liziero 71'	Stadium: Estadio Brigadier General Estanislao López; Referee: Mario Díaz de Vivar (Paraguay)
	Penalties
	Ruiz (penalty scored); Estigarribia (penalty scored); Correa (penalty scored); Fritzler (penalty scored); Ortiz (penalty scored)		(penalty scored) Nenê; (penalty scored) Reinaldo; (penalty scored) Hudson; (penalty missed) Bruno Alves

=== Campeonato Brasileiro Série A ===
==== Results summary ====
Overall								Home						Away					
Pld	W	D	L	GF	GA	GD	Pts	W	D	L	GF	GA	GD	W	D	L	GF	GA	GD
38	16	15	7	46	34	+12	63	10	8	1	25	13	+12	6	7	6	21	21	0

==== Results by round ====
Round	1	2	3	4	5	6	7	8	9	10	11	12	13	14	15	16	17	18	19	20	21	22	23	24	25	26	27	28	29	30	31	32	33	34	35	36	37	38
Ground	H	A	A	H	A	H	A	H	A	H	A	H	A	H	A	A	H	A	H	A	H	H	A	H	A	H	A	H	A	H	A	H	A	H	H	A	H	A
Result	W	D	D	D	D	W	W	W	L	D	W	W	W	W	L	W	W	W	W	D	W	D	L	W	D	D	D	L	L	D	W	D	D	D	W	L	D	L
Position	7	6	7	10	12	7	4	2	4	6	3	3	2	2	2	2	1	1	1	1	1	1	2	2	1	1	3	4	4	4	4	4	5	5	5	5	5	5

Updated to match(es) played on 2 December 2018. Source: Globo Esporte
A = Away; H = Home; W = Win; D = Draw; L = Loss

16 April 1	São Paulo	1–0	Paraná	São Paulo
20:00 UTC-03:00	Bruno Alves 36'	Report		Stadium: Estádio Cícero Pompeu de Toledo (Morumbi); Attendance: 11,327; Referee: Bráulio da Silva Machado

22 April 2	Ceará	0–0	São Paulo	Fortaleza
16:00 UTC-03:00		Report		Stadium: Estádio Governador Plácido Castelo (Castelão); Attendance: 30,186; Referee: Paulo Roberto Alves Júnior

29 April 3	Fluminense	1–1	São Paulo	Rio de Janeiro
16:00 UTC-03:00	Pedro 88'	Report	Éder Militão 22'	Stadium: Estádio Jornalista Mário Filho (Maracanã); Attendance: 17,211; Referee: Rodolpho Toski Marques

5 May 4	São Paulo	2–2	Atlético Mineiro	São Paulo
19:00 UTC-03:00	Éverton 24'; Diego Souza 82'	Report	Róger Guedes 70'; Ricardo Oliveira 79'	Stadium: Estádio Cícero Pompeu de Toledo (Morumbi); Attendance: 31,976; Referee: Rafael Traci

13 May 5	Bahia	2–2	São Paulo	Salvador
16:00 UTC-03:00	Edigar Junio 11' (pen.), 38'	Report	Tréllez 30'; Shaylon 90+4'	Stadium: Itaipava Arena Fonte Nova; Attendance: 20,934; Referee: Dewson Fernando Freitas da Silva

20 May 6	São Paulo	1–0	Santos	São Paulo
16:00 UTC-03:00	Diego Souza 56'	Report		Stadium: Estádio Cícero Pompeu de Toledo (Morumbi); Attendance: 40,665; Referee: Braulio da Silva Machado

27 May 7	América Mineiro	1–3	São Paulo	Belo Horizonte
19:00 UTC-03:00	Rafael Moura 11'	Report	Diego Souza 8'; Nenê 45+2' (pen.), 60'	Stadium: Estádio Raimundo Sampaio (Independência); Attendance: 4,360; Referee: Bruno Arleu de Araújo

30 May 8	São Paulo	3–2	Botafogo	São Paulo
21:00 UTC-03:00	Nenê 19' (pen.); Diego Souza 29'; Éverton 45+4'	Report	Valencia 15'; Rodrigo Pimpão 82'	Stadium: Estádio Cícero Pompeu de Toledo (Morumbi); Attendance: 25,427; Referee: Wilton Pereira Sampaio

2 June 9	Palmeiras	3–1	São Paulo	São Paulo
21:00 UTC-03:00	Willian 55', 66'; Dudu 68'	Report	Marcos Guilherme 31'	Stadium: Allianz Arena; Attendance: 32,841; Referee: Rodolpho Toski Marques

5 June 10	São Paulo	0–0	Internacional	São Paulo
21:30 UTC-03:00		Report		Stadium: Estádio Cícero Pompeu de Toledo (Morumbi); Attendance: 14,730; Referee: Paulo Roberto Alves Júnior

9 June 11	Atlético Paranaense	0–1	São Paulo	Curitiba
16:00 UTC-03:00		Report	Nenê 61' (pen.)	Stadium: Arena Joaquim Américo Guimarães (Arena da Baixada); Attendance: 9,323; Referee: Anderson Daronco

12 June 12	São Paulo	3–0	Vitória	São Paulo
21:30 UTC-03:00	Nenê 20', 41'; Éverton 53'	Report		Stadium: Estádio Cícero Pompeu de Toledo (Morumbi); Attendance: 20,456; Referee: Igor Junio Benevenuto

18 July 13	Flamengo	0–1	São Paulo	Rio de Janeiro
21:45 UTC-03:00		Report	Éverton 47'	Stadium: Estádio Jornalista Mário Filho (Maracanã); Attendance: 55,986; Referee: Paulo Roberto Alves Júnior

21 July 14	São Paulo	3–1	Corinthians	São Paulo
21:00 UTC-03:00	Anderson Martins 55'; Reinaldo 69', 81'	Report	Jonathas 90+1'	Stadium: Estádio Cícero Pompeu de Toledo (Morumbi); Attendance: 58,624; Referee: Marcelo de Lima Henrique

26 July 15	Grêmio	2–1	São Paulo	Porto Alegre
19:30 UTC-03:00	Éverton 45+2', 60'	Report	Diego Souza 4'	Stadium: Arena do Grêmio; Attendance: 19,865; Referee: Grazianni Maciel Rocha

29 July 16	Cruzeiro	0–2	São Paulo	Belo Horizonte
16:00 UTC-03:00		Report	Diego Souza 26'; Éverton 76'	Stadium: Estádio Governador Magalhães Pinto (Mineirão); Attendance: 26,800; Referee: Wagner do Nascimento Guimarães

5 August 17	São Paulo	2–1	Vasco da Gama	São Paulo
16:00 UTC-03:00	Rojas 1'; Tréllez 80'	Report	Yago Pikachu 54'	Stadium: Estádio Cícero Pompeu de Toledo (Morumbi); Attendance: 53,437; Referee: Bráulio da Silva Machado

12 August 18	Sport	1–3	São Paulo	Recife
16:00 UTC-03:00	Marlone 86'	Report	Diego Souza 29'; Nenê 52'; Tréllez 89'	Stadium: Estádio Adelmar da Costa Carvalho (Ilha do Retiro); Attendance: 16,050; Referee: Anderson Daronco

19 August 19	São Paulo	2–0	Chapecoense	São Paulo
19:00 UTC-03:00	Shaylon 3'; Hudson 82'	Report		Stadium: Estádio Cícero Pompeu de Toledo (Morumbi); Attendance: 41,075; Referee: Rafael Traci

22 August 20	Paraná	1–1	São Paulo	Curitiba
19:30 UTC-03:00	Júnior 37'	Report	Nenê 8'	Stadium: Estádio Durival Britto e Silva (Vila Capanema); Attendance: 8,561; Referee: Péricles Bassols Pegado Cortez

26 August 21	São Paulo	1–0	Ceará	São Paulo
11:00 UTC-03:00	Bruno Peres 77'	Report		Stadium: Estádio Cícero Pompeu de Toledo (Morumbi); Attendance: 57,323; Referee: Wagner Reway

2 September 22	São Paulo	1–1	Fluminense	São Paulo
16:00 UTC-03:00	Tréllez 71'	Report	Anderson Martins 53' (o.g.)	Stadium: Estádio Cícero Pompeu de Toledo (Morumbi); Attendance: 49,348; Referee: Dewson Fernando Freitas da Silva

5 September 23	Atlético Mineiro	1–0	São Paulo	Belo Horizonte
21:45 UTC-03:00	Régis 8' (o.g.)	Report		Stadium: Estádio Raimundo Sampaio (Independência); Attendance: 20,852; Referee: Anderson Daronco

9 September 24	São Paulo	1–0	Bahia	São Paulo
19:00 UTC-03:00	Diego Souza 59'	Report		Stadium: Estádio Cícero Pompeu de Toledo (Morumbi); Attendance: 43,555; Referee: André Luiz de Freitas Castro

16 September 25	Santos	0–0	São Paulo	Santos
16:00 UTC-03:00		Report		Stadium: Estádio Urbano Caldeira (Vila Belmiro); Attendance: 13,488; Referee: Ricardo Marques Ribeiro

22 September 26	São Paulo	1–1	América Mineiro	São Paulo
16:00 UTC-03:00	Diego Souza 45+1'	Report	Matheusinho 80'	Stadium: Estádio Cícero Pompeu de Toledo (Morumbi); Attendance: 47,846; Referee: Wilton Pereira Sampaio

30 September 27	Botafogo	2–2	São Paulo	Rio de Janeiro
16:00 UTC-03:00	Jean 4'; Kieza 24'	Report	Diego Souza 7'; Carneiro 61'	Stadium: Estádio Olímpico Nilton Santos (Engenhão); Attendance: 19,976; Referee: Rafael Traci

6 October 28	São Paulo	0–2	Palmeiras	São Paulo
18:00 UTC-03:00		Report	Gómez 33'; Deyverson 37'	Stadium: Estádio Cícero Pompeu de Toledo (Morumbi); Attendance: 56,694; Referee: Wilton Pereira Sampaio

14 October 29	Internacional	3–1	São Paulo	Porto Alegre
16:00 UTC-03:00	Leandro Damião 45', 51'; Nico López 90+4' (pen.)	Report	Liziero 2'	Stadium: Estádio José Pinheiro Borda (Beira-Rio); Attendance: 45,263; Referee: Braulio da Silva Machado

20 October 30	São Paulo	0–0	Atlético Paranaense	São Paulo
19:00 UTC-03:00		Report		Stadium: Estádio Cícero Pompeu de Toledo (Morumbi); Attendance: 13,053; Referee: Péricles Bassols Pegado Cortez

26 October 31	Vitória	0–1	São Paulo	Salvador
19:30 UTC-03:00		Report	Bruno Alves 82'	Stadium: Estádio Manoel Barradas (Barradão); Attendance: 11,714; Referee: Leandro Pedro Vuaden

4 November 32	São Paulo	2–2	Flamengo	São Paulo
17:00 UTC-02:00	Diego Souza 7'; Helinho 50'	Report	Uribe 9'; Rodinei 81'	Stadium: Estádio Cícero Pompeu de Toledo (Morumbi); Attendance: 32,612; Referee: Wilton Pereira Sampaio

10 November 33	Corinthians	1–1	São Paulo	São Paulo
17:00 UTC-02:00	Ralf 71'	Report	Brenner 80'	Stadium: Arena Corinthians; Attendance: 43,122; Referee: Rodolpho Toski Marques

15 November 34	São Paulo	1–1	Grêmio	São Paulo
19:00 UTC-02:00	Michel 73' (o.g.)	Report	Éverton 61'	Stadium: Estádio Cícero Pompeu de Toledo (Morumbi); Attendance: 24,757; Referee: Péricles Bassols Pegado Cortez

18 November 35	São Paulo	1–0	Cruzeiro	São Paulo
19:00 UTC-02:00	Diego Souza 30'	Report		Stadium: Estádio Cícero Pompeu de Toledo (Morumbi); Attendance: 14,058; Referee: Heber Roberto Lopes

22 November 36	Vasco da Gama	2–0	São Paulo	Rio de Janeiro
20:00 UTC-02:00	Andrey 18'; Yago Pikachu 90+4'	Report		Stadium: Estádio Vasco da Gama (São Januário); Attendance: 14,917; Referee: Anderson Daronco

26 November 37	São Paulo	0–0	Sport	São Paulo
20:00 UTC-02:00		Report		Stadium: Estádio Cícero Pompeu de Toledo (Morumbi); Attendance: 15,235; Referee: André Luiz de Freitas Castro

2 December 38	Chapecoense	1–0	São Paulo	Chapecó
17:00 UTC-02:00	Leandro Pereira 67'	Report		Stadium: Arena Condá; Attendance: 19,992; Referee: Wilton Pereira Sampaio
