= 2017 São Paulo FC season =

São Paulo
2017 season
- Chairman: Carlos Augusto de Barros e Silva (Leco)
- Manager: Rogério Ceni (until 2 July); Pintado (caretaker); Dorival Júnior
- Stadium: Estádio do Morumbi
- Série A: 13th
- Campeonato Paulista: Semi-finals
- Copa Sudamericana: First stage
- Copa do Brasil: Fourth round
- Top goalscorer: League: Hernanes (9); All: Lucas Pratto (14)
- Highest home attendance: 61,142 (v Corinthians in Campeonato Brasileiro)
- Lowest home attendance: 11,886 (v Ituano in Campeonato Paulista)
Home colours	Away colours	Third colours

The 2017 season was São Paulo's 88th year since the club's existence. At the beginning of this year São Paulo had as a featured the return of retired goalkeeper Rogerio Ceni, the owner of record numbers in Tricolor´s history such as 1,237 matches and 131 goals in 23 years. Ceni was hired as head coach just a year after retirement, and during his time off the former player spent his time studying technical fundamentals of football management in some clubs of Europe like Liverpool and Sevilla. In the first activity by São Paulo, the newly coach earned a preseason friendly tournament in Florida after two wins in penalty shootout, the final match was played against rivals Corinthians and game ended in 0-0 (4–3 in penalties). Although the victorious beginning the ex-goalkeeper remained only 6 months in charge reaching a 50% performance of points acquired by official competitive matches, Ceni take group to semi-finals being eliminated by Corinthians after two legs. In national cup, Copa do Brasil, São Paulo disputed until fourth round when was defeated by Cruzeiro in aggregated score 2-3 (0–2 home; 2–1 away). Third setback in a short period of one month came against newcomer Argentine club in international competitions, Defensa y Justicia, who stopped The Dearest doing a double equal results and scoring a single goal in Morumbi Stadium, fact that led them to next stage (0–0 away; 1–1 home). Lastly Ceni managed in first eleven rounds of Série A (national league) being fired due its positioning in table as 17th place, first round that Tricolor appeared in relegation zone. The charge was occupied by former goalkeeper until July 3 after 35 official matches and replaced by Dorival Júnior, previous head coach from one of biggest rivals Santos FC. Dorival had commanded the seashore club over 120 games with an expressive percentage of points approximately 64% got in two times. Although there has been a change, team kept an irregular performance in the course of league fighting against relegation in most of rounds and being 14 rounds between the last four positions. Around 10 matches before the end of season, The Dearest improved his campaign being one of the best clubs in the second half of championship. Never before São Paulo was relegated in whole history of Campeonato Brasileiro Era since 1971 but took a negative record of most rounds ended in relegation zone, more than 2013 when spent 11 rounds there.

== Players ==
=== Current squad ===
As of 23 August 2017

Note: Flags indicate national team as defined under FIFA eligibility rules; some limited exceptions apply. Players may hold more than one non-FIFA nationality.

No.	Pos.	Nation	Player
1	GK	BRA	Denis
2	DF	BRA	Bruno
3	DF	BRA	Rodrigo Caio
4	DF	ECU	Robert Arboleda
5	DF	URU	Diego Lugano (captain)
6	MF	BRA	Petros
7	MF	BRA	Maicosuel
9	FW	ARG	Lucas Pratto (vice-captain)
10	MF	PER	Christian Cueva
11	MF	BRA	Lucas Fernandes
12	GK	BRA	Sidão
13	MF	BRA	Éder Militão
15	MF	BRA	Hernanes (on loan from Hebei China Fortune)
16	DF	BRA	Edimar (on loan from Cruzeiro)
17	FW	BRA	Gilberto
18	DF	ARG	Julio Buffarini

No.	Pos.	Nation	Player
19	MF	BRA	Thomaz
20	MF	BRA	Shaylon
21	FW	BRA	Wellington Nem (on loan from Shakhtar Donetsk)
22	DF	BRA	Júnior Tavares
23	MF	BRA	Marcos Guilherme (on loan from Atlético Paranaense)
25	MF	BRA	Jucilei (on loan from Shandong Luneng)
28	MF	BRA	Felipe Araruna
30	GK	BRA	Renan Ribeiro
32	DF	BRA	Aderlan (on loan from Valencia)
33	MF	ARG	Jonathan Gómez
34	DF	BRA	Bruno Alves
35	FW	BRA	Brenner
38	FW	BRA	Morato (on loan from Ituano)
39	FW	BRA	Marcinho (on loan from São Bernardo)
40	GK	BRA	Lucas Perri
41	FW	BRA	Denílson (on loan from Granada)

=== Transfers ===
==== In ====
Note: Flags indicate national team as defined under FIFA eligibility rules; some limited exceptions apply. Players may hold more than one non-FIFA nationality.

No.	Pos.	Nation	Player
21	MF	BRA	Wellington Nem (on loan from Shakhtar Donetsk)
12	GK	BRA	Sidão (from Botafogo)
7	FW	BRA	Neílton (on loan from Cruzeiro)
8	MF	BRA	Cícero (from Fluminense)
14	FW	ARG	Lucas Pratto (from Atlético Mineiro)
25	MF	BRA	Jucilei (on loan from Shandong Luneng)
16	DF	BRA	Edimar (on loan from Cruzeiro)
19	MF	BRA	Thomaz (from Jorge Wilstermann)

No.	Pos.	Nation	Player
39	FW	BRA	Marcinho (on loan from São Bernardo)
38	FW	BRA	Morato (on loan from Ituano)
7	MF	BRA	Maicosuel (from Atlético Mineiro)
41	FW	BRA	Denílson (on loan from Avaí)
4	DF	ECU	Robert Arboleda (from Universidad Católica del Ecuador)
33	MF	ARG	Jonathan Gómez (from Santa Fe)
6	MF	BRA	Petros (from Betis)
15	MF	BRA	Hernanes (on loan from Hebei China Fortune)

==== Out ====
Note: Flags indicate national team as defined under FIFA eligibility rules; some limited exceptions apply. Players may hold more than one non-FIFA nationality.

No.	Pos.	Nation	Player
—	DF	CHI	Eugenio Mena (return to Cruzeiro)
—	GK	BRA	Léo (on loan to Paraná)
—	MF	BRA	Hudson (on loan to Cruzeiro)
—	MF	BRA	Michel Bastos (rescission of contract)
—	MF	BRA	Kelvin (return to Porto)
—	FW	BRA	Ytalo (on loan to Audax)
—	MF	BRA	Jean Carlos (to Goiás)
—	DF	BRA	Reinaldo (on loan to Chapecoense)
—	DF	BRA	Matheus Reis (on loan to Bahia)
—	DF	BRA	Auro Jr. (on loan to América-MG)
—	DF	BRA	Carlinhos (to Internacional)
—	FW	BRA	David Neres (to Ajax)

No.	Pos.	Nation	Player
—	MF	BRA	Artur (on loan to Columbus Crew SC)
—	MF	BRA	Daniel (on loan to Coritiba)
13	DF	BRA	Foguete (on loan to Vila Nova)
—	DF	BRA	Lucas Kal (on loan to Paraná Clube)
—	FW	BRA	Pedro Bortoluzo (on loan to Paraná Clube)
—	FW	BRA	Robson (return to Paraná Clube)
19	DF	BRA	Lyanco (to Torino)
7	FW	BRA	Neílton (to Vitória)
31	FW	BRA	Luiz Araújo (to Lille)
27	DF	BRA	Maicon (to Galatasaray)
23	MF	BRA	Thiago Mendes (to Lille)
15	MF	BRA	João Schmidt (to Atalanta)

== Statistics ==
=== Appearances and goals ===
No.	Pos	Nat	Player	Total		Campeonato Paulista		Copa do Brasil		Copa Sudamericana		Campeonato Brasileiro	
No.	Pos	Nat	Player	Apps	Goals	Apps	Goals	Apps	Goals	Apps	Goals	Apps	Goals
1	GK	(Brazil) BRA	Denis	7	0	3+0	0	3+0	0	1+0	0	0+0	0
2	DF	(Brazil) BRA	Bruno	21	0	6+2	0	3+0	0	1+0	0	6+3	0
3	DF	(Brazil) BRA	Rodrigo Caio	52	1	11+0	1	6+0	0	2+0	0	33+0	0
4	DF	(Ecuador) ECU	Robert Arboleda	23	3	0+0	0	0+0	0	0+0	0	23+0	3
5	DF	(Uruguay) URU	Diego Lugano	11	0	4+1	0	1+0	0	0+0	0	5+0	0
6	MF	(Brazil) BRA	Petros	27	1	0+0	0	0+0	0	0+0	0	27+0	1
7	MF	(Brazil) BRA	Maicosuel	8	1	0+0	0	0+0	0	0+0	0	3+5	1
8	MF	(Brazil) BRA	Cícero	30	4	11+3	1	6+0	3	0+0	0	8+2	0
9	FW	(Argentina) ARG	Lucas Pratto	47	14	7+0	5	4+0	2	2+0	0	34+0	7
10	MF	(Peru) PER	Christian Cueva	42	10	9+0	5	5+0	2	1+0	0	24+3	3
12	GK	(Brazil) BRA	Sidão	25	0	6+0	0	1+0	0	0+0	0	18+0	0
13	MF	(Brazil) BRA	Éder Militão	22	2	0+0	0	0+0	0	0+0	0	21+1	2
15	MF	(Brazil) BRA	Hernanes	19	9	0+0	0	0+0	0	0+0	0	19+0	9
16	DF	(Brazil) BRA	Edimar	19	0	0+0	0	0+0	0	0+0	0	19+0	0
17	FW	(Brazil) BRA	Gilberto	33	13	8+3	9	2+2	2	0+1	0	2+15	2
18	DF	(Argentina) ARG	Julio Buffarini	21	0	9+1	0	3+0	0	1+0	0	6+1	0
19	MF	(Brazil) BRA	Thomaz	19	2	1+3	1	0+2	0	0+1	0	2+10	1
20	MF	(Brazil) BRA	Shaylon	16	2	2+2	0	0+1	0	0+1	0	4+6	2
21	FW	(Brazil) BRA	Wellington Nem	23	1	5+3	0	2+2	0	1+0	0	5+5	1
22	DF	(Brazil) BRA	Júnior Tavares	45	0	13+1	0	6+0	0	1+1	0	19+4	0
23	MF	(Brazil) BRA	Marcos Guilherme	22	6	0+0	0	0+0	0	0+0	0	19+3	6
25	MF	(Brazil) BRA	Jucilei	49	1	7+3	0	1+1	0	2+0	0	31+4	1
26	DF	(Brazil) BRA	Douglas	6	0	5+0	0	0+0	0	0+0	0	1+0	0
28	MF	(Brazil) BRA	Araruna	23	0	6+5	0	0+3	0	1+0	0	7+1	0
29	MF	(Brazil) BRA	Lucas Fernandes	23	1	0+3	0	0+1	0	0+0	0	8+11	1
29	FW	(Brazil) BRA	Guilherme Bissoli	1	0	0+0	0	0+0	0	0+0	0	0+1	0
30	GK	(Brazil) BRA	Renan Ribeiro	30	0	7+0	0	2+0	0	1+0	0	20+0	0
32	DF	(Brazil) BRA	Aderlan Santos	3	0	0+0	0	0+0	0	0+0	0	0+3	0
33	MF	(Argentina) ARG	Jonathan Gómez	12	0	0+0	0	0+0	0	0+0	0	7+5	0
34	DF	(Brazil) BRA	Bruno Alves	4	1	0+0	0	0+0	0	0+0	0	3+1	1
35	FW	(Brazil) BRA	Brenner	4	1	0+0	0	0+0	0	0+0	0	2+2	1
37	FW	(Brazil) BRA	Léo Natel	1	0	0+0	0	0+0	0	0+0	0	0+1	0
38	FW	(Brazil) BRA	Morato	1	0	0+0	0	1+0	0	0+0	0	0+0	0
39	FW	(Brazil) BRA	Marcinho	21	2	0+0	0	0+0	0	0+0	0	16+5	2
41	FW	(Brazil) BRA	Denílson	12	1	0+0	0	0+0	0	0+0	0	2+10	1
42	MF	(Brazil) BRA	Gabriel Sara	1	0	0+0	0	0+0	0	0+0	0	0+1	0
Players who are on loan/left São Paulo this season:
4	DF	(Brazil) BRA	Lucão	11	0	3+0	0	0+0	0	2+0	0	6+0	0
6	MF	(Brazil) BRA	Wellington	4	0	1+1	0	0+1	0	0+1	0	0+0	0
7	FW	(Brazil) BRA	Neílton	9	0	2+4	0	1+1	0	1+0	0	0+0	0
9	FW	(Argentina) ARG	Andrés Chávez	10	2	2+5	2	0+1	0	1+0	0	0+1	0
11	MF	(Brazil) BRA	Wesley	6	0	2+0	0	1+0	0	0+0	0	1+2	0
13	DF	(Brazil) BRA	Foguete	0	0	0+0	0	0+0	0	0+0	0	0+0	0
15	MF	(Brazil) BRA	João Schmidt	20	0	8+2	0	5+0	0	2+0	0	1+2	0
19	DF	(Brazil) BRA	Lyanco	1	0	0+0	0	0+1	0	0+0	0	0+0	0
23	MF	(Brazil) BRA	Thiago Mendes	26	5	14+1	4	5+0	0	1+0	1	4+1	0
27	DF	(Brazil) BRA	Maicon	21	1	10+0	1	4+0	0	0+0	0	7+0	0
31	FW	(Brazil) BRA	Luiz Araújo	24	7	12+3	3	3+1	2	0+1	0	2+2	2
33	DF	(Brazil) BRA	Breno	5	0	2+0	0	1+1	0	1+0	0	0+0	0

=== Top scorers ===
Rank	Nat	Pos	Player	Campeonato Paulista	Copa do Brasil	Copa Sudamericana	Campeonato Brasileiro	Total
1	(Argentina)	FW	Lucas Pratto	5	2	0	7	14
2	(Brazil)	FW	Gilberto	9	2	0	2	13
3	(Peru)	MF	Christian Cueva	5	2	0	3	10
4	(Brazil)	MF	Hernanes	0	0	0	9	9
5	(Brazil)	FW	Luiz Araújo	3	2	0	2	7
6	(Brazil)	MF	Marcos Guilherme	0	0	0	6	6
7	(Brazil)	MF	Thiago Mendes	4	0	1	0	5
8	(Brazil)	MF	Cícero	1	3	0	0	4
9	(Ecuador)	DF	Robert Arboleda	0	0	0	3	3
10	(Argentina)	FW	Andrés Chávez	2	0	0	0	2
=	(Brazil)	MF	Éder Militão	0	0	0	2	2
=	(Brazil)	FW	Marcinho	0	0	0	2	2
=	(Brazil)	DF	Shaylon	0	0	0	2	2
=	(Brazil)	MF	Thomaz	1	0	0	1	2
11	(Brazil)	FW	Brenner	0	0	0	1	1
=	(Brazil)	DF	Bruno Alves	0	0	0	1	1
=	(Brazil)	FW	Denílson	0	0	0	1	1
=	(Brazil)	MF	Jucilei	0	0	0	1	1
=	(Brazil)	MF	Lucas Fernandes	0	0	0	1	1
=	(Brazil)	DF	Maicon	1	0	0	0	1
=	(Brazil)	FW	Maicosuel	0	0	0	1	1
=	(Brazil)	MF	Petros	0	0	0	1	1
=	(Brazil)	DF	Rodrigo Caio	1	0	0	0	1
=	(Brazil)	FW	Wellington Nem	0	0	0	1	1
				1	0	0	1	2
Total				33	11	1	48	93

=== Managers performance ===
Name	Nationality	From	To	P	W	D	L	GF	GA	%
Rogério Ceni	Brazil	5 February	2 July	35	14	11	10	55	42	50%
Pintado (caretaker)	Brazil	9 July	9 July	1	0	0	1	2	3	0%
Dorival Júnior	Brazil	13 July	3 December	26	10	9	7	36	35	50%

=== Overview ===
Competition	First match	Last match	Starting round	Final position	Record							
Competition	First match	Last match	Starting round	Final position	Pld	W	D	L	GF	GA	GD	Win %
Série A	14 May 2017	3 December 2017	Matchday 1	13th	38	13	11	14	48	49	−1	34.21
Copa do Brasil	9 February 2017	19 April 2017	First Round	Fourth Round	6	4	1	1	11	7	+4	66.67
Campeonato Paulista	5 February 2017	23 April 2017	Matchday 1	Semi-Finals	16	7	6	3	33	23	+10	43.75
Copa Sudamericana	5 April 2017	11 May 2017	Second Stage	Second Stage	2	0	2	0	1	1	+0	0.00
Total					62	24	20	18	93	80	+13	38.71

Source: Competitions

Games played	62 (16 Campeonato Paulista, 6 Copa do Brasil, 2 Copa Sudamericana, 38 Campeonato Brasileiro)
Games won	24 (7 Campeonato Paulista, 4 Copa do Brasil, 0 Copa Sudamericana, 13 Campeonato Brasileiro)
Games drawn	20 (6 Campeonato Paulista, 1 Copa do Brasil, 2 Copa Sudamericana, 11 Campeonato Brasileiro)
Games lost	18 (3 Campeonato Paulista, 1 Copa do Brasil, 0 Copa Sudamericana, 14 Campeonato Brasileiro)
Goals scored	93
Goals conceded	80
Goal difference	+13
Best result	5−0 (H) v Linense − Campeonato Paulista
Worst result	0−3 (A) v Palmeiras − Campeonato Paulista
Top scorer	Lucas Pratto (14)

Source: Competitions

== Friendlies ==
=== Florida Cup ===
19 January Semi-final	São Paulo (Brazil)	0–0 (8–7 p)	(Argentina) River Plate	St. Petersburg
19:00 UTC-05:00		Report		Stadium: Al Lang Stadium; Referee: Andrew Musashe
	Penalties
	João Schmidt (penalty scored); Cícero (penalty scored); Wesley (penalty missed); Shaylon (penalty scored); Gilberto (penalty scored); Júnior Tavares (penalty scored); Araruna (penalty scored); Lugano (penalty scored); Lucão (penalty scored)		(penalty missed) Martínez; (penalty scored) Fernández; (penalty scored) Mora; (penalty scored) Driussi; (penalty scored) Mina; (penalty scored) Arzura; (penalty scored) Montiel; (penalty scored) Mayada; (penalty missed) Moya

21 January Final	Corinthians (Brazil)	0–0 (3–4 p)	(Brazil) São Paulo	Orlando
18:00 UTC-05:00		Report		Stadium: Bright House Networks Stadium; Referee: Jonathan Weiner
	Penalties
	Fellipe Bastos (penalty missed); Giovanni Augusto (penalty scored); Marciel (penalty missed); Paulo Roberto (penalty scored); Marlone (penalty scored)		(penalty scored) João Schmidt; (penalty scored) Cícero; (penalty missed) Araruna; (penalty scored) Júnior Tavares; (penalty scored) Gilberto

== Official competitions ==
=== Group B ===
Pos	Team	Pld	W	D	L	GF	GA	GD	Pts	Qualification
1	São Paulo	12	5	5	2	25	20	+5	20	knockout stage
2	Linense	12	5	2	5	16	25	−9	17	knockout stage
3	Red Bull Brasil	12	3	4	5	14	16	−2	13	
4	Ferroviária	12	3	4	5	10	15	−5	13	

Source: Soccerway

==== First stage ====
5 February 1	Audax	4–2	São Paulo	Barueri
17:00 UTC-02:00	Marquinhos 6'; Pedro Carmona 10', 75' (pen.); Felipe Rodrigues 55'	Report	Chávez 30', 37'	Stadium: Arena Barueri; Attendance: 2,219; Referee: Thiago Duarte Peixoto

12 February 2	São Paulo	5–2	Ponte Preta	São Paulo
17:00 UTC-02:00	Cueva 32'; Gilberto 44', 58', 69'; Thiago Mendes 56'	Report	Matheus Jesus 22'; Lucca 83'	Stadium: Estádio Cícero Pompeu de Toledo (Morumbi); Attendance: 50,952; Referee: Thiago Duarte Peixoto

15 February 3	Santos	1–3	São Paulo	Santos
21:45 UTC-02:00	Copete 10'	Report	Cueva 36' (pen.); Luiz Araújo 55', 72'	Stadium: Estádio Urbano Caldeira (Vila Belmiro); Attendance: 11,320; Referee: Vinicius Gonçalvez Dias Araújo

18 February 4	São Paulo	2–2	Mirassol	São Paulo
19:30 UTC-02:00	Pratto 8'; Rodrigo Caio 52'	Report	Rafhael Lucas 75'; Xuxa 90+1'	Stadium: Estádio Cícero Pompeu de Toledo (Morumbi); Attendance: 43,961; Referee: Leandro Bizzio Marinho

21 February 5	São Paulo	3–2	São Bento	São Paulo
20:30 UTC-03:00	Pratto 28', 50'; Cueva 87' (pen.)	Report	Pitty 8'; Régis 77'	Stadium: Estádio Cícero Pompeu de Toledo (Morumbi); Attendance: 14,011; Referee: Vinicius Furlan

25 February 6	Novorizontino	2–2	São Paulo	Novo Horizonte
19:30 UTC-03:00	Roberto 67' (pen.); Railan 88'	Report	Gilberto 29'; Thiago Mendes 51'	Stadium: Estádio Jorge Ismael de Biase; Attendance: 6,494; Referee: Salim Fende Chavez

5 March 7	São Paulo	4–1	Santo André	São Paulo
16:00 UTC-03:00	Cícero 5'; Cueva 27'; Luiz Araújo 76'; Gilberto 89'	Report	Leonardo 61'	Stadium: Estádio Cícero Pompeu de Toledo (Morumbi); Attendance: 20,694; Referee: Luiz Flavio de Oliveira

11 March 8	Palmeiras	3–0	São Paulo	São Paulo
16:00 UTC-03:00	Dudu 45'; Tchê Tchê 55'; Guerra 70'	Report		Stadium: Allianz Parque; Attendance: 36,090; Referee: Marcelo Aparecido Ribeiro de Souza

18 March 9	São Paulo	1–1	Ituano	São Paulo
16:00 UTC-03:00	Cueva 42'	Report	Wellington Simião 61'	Stadium: Estádio Cícero Pompeu de Toledo (Morumbi); Attendance: 11,886; Referee: Rodrigo Guarizo Ferreira do Amaral

22 March 10	Botafogo	1–1	São Paulo	Ribeirão Preto
21:45 UTC-03:00	Kauê 53'	Report	Gilberto 20'	Stadium: Estádio Santa Cruz; Attendance: 12,388; Referee: Leandro Bizzio Marinho

26 March 11	São Paulo	1–1	Corinthians	São Paulo
16:00 UTC-03:00	Maicon 51'	Report	Jô 64'	Stadium: Estádio Cícero Pompeu de Toledo (Morumbi); Attendance: 51,869; Referee: Vinicius Furlan

29 March 12	São Bernardo	0–1	São Paulo	São Bernardo do Campo
21:45 UTC-03:00		Report	Gilberto 85'	Stadium: Estádio Primeiro de Maio; Referee: Vinícius Gonçalves Dias Araújo

==== Quarter-finals ====
2 April First leg	Linense	0–2	São Paulo	São Paulo
16:00 UTC−03:00		Report	Diego Felipe 48' (o.g.); Pratto 90+3'	Stadium: Estádio Cícero Pompeu de Toledo (Morumbi); Attendance: 15,480; Referee: Leandro Bizzio Marinho

8 April Second leg	São Paulo	5–0 (7–0 agg.)	Linense	São Paulo
16:00 UTC−03:00	Gilberto 22', 80'; Thiago Mendes 46', 59'; Thomaz 78'	Report		Stadium: Estádio Cícero Pompeu de Toledo (Morumbi); Attendance: 27,230; Referee: Luiz Flávio de Oliveira

==== Semi-finals ====
16 April First leg	São Paulo	0–2	Corinthians	São Paulo
19:00 UTC−03:00		Report	Jô 20'; Rodriguinho 45+2'	Stadium: Estádio Cícero Pompeu de Toledo (Morumbi); Attendance: 45,366; Referee: Luiz Flavio de Oliveira

23 April Second leg	Corinthians	1–1 (3–1 agg.)	São Paulo	São Paulo
16:00 UTC−03:00	Jô 45+1'	Report	Pratto 84'	Stadium: Arena Corinthians; Attendance: 43,394; Referee: Flávio Rodrigues de Souza

=== Copa do Brasil ===
==== First round ====
9 February Single match	Moto Club-MA	0–1	São Paulo	São Luís
21:30 UTC-02:00		Report	Gilberto 1'	Stadium: Estádio Governador João Castelo (Castelão); Referee: Jailson Macedo Freitas

==== Second round ====
1 March Single match	PSTC	2–4	São Paulo	Londrina
19:30 UTC-03:00	Lucão 14'; Carlos Henrique 44'	Report	Cícero 13', 35', 71'; Cueva 42' (pen.)	Stadium: Estádio Municipal Jacy Scaff (do Café); Attendance: 15,585; Referee: Marcelo de Lima Henrique

==== Third round ====
8 March First leg	São Paulo	3–1	ABC	São Paulo
19:30 UTC−03:00	Luiz Araújo 27', 51'; Pratto 56'	Report	Márcio Passos 54'	Stadium: Estádio Cícero Pompeu de Toledo (Morumbi); Attendance: 15,101; Referee: Braulio da Silva Machado

15 March Second leg	ABC	1–1 (2–4 agg.)	São Paulo	Natal
19:30 UTC−03:00	Márcio Passos 1'	Report	Cueva 37'	Stadium: Estádio Maria Lamas Farache (Frasqueirão); Attendance: 15,016; Referee: Wagner do Nascimento Magalhães

==== Fourth round ====
13 April First leg	São Paulo	0–2	Cruzeiro	São Paulo
21:30 UTC−03:00		Report	Pratto 62' (o.g.); Hudson 70'	Stadium: Estádio Cícero Pompeu de Toledo (Morumbi); Attendance: 43,662; Referee: Anderson Daronco

19 April Second leg	Cruzeiro	1–2 (3–2 agg.)	São Paulo	Belo Horizonte
19:30 UTC−03:00	Thiago Neves 59'	Report	Pratto 14'; Gilberto 78'	Stadium: Estádio Governador Magalhães Pinto (Mineirão); Attendance: 32,353; Referee: Wilton Pereira Sampaio

=== Copa Sudamericana ===
==== First stage ====
5 April First leg	Defensa y Justicia (Argentina)	0–0	(Brazil) São Paulo	Lanús
19:15 UTC−03:00		Report		Stadium: Estadio Ciudad de Lanús – Néstor Díaz Pérez (La Fortaleza); Referee: Jesus Valenzuela (Venezuela)

11 May Second leg	São Paulo (Brazil)	1–1 (1–1a agg.)	(Argentina) Defensa y Justicia	São Paulo
21:45 UTC−03:00	Thiago Mendes 5'	Report	Castellani 10'	Stadium: Estádio Cícero Pompeu de Toledo (Morumbi); Attendance: 14,999; Referee: Ulises Mereles

=== Campeonato Brasileiro Série A ===
==== Results summary ====
Overall								Home						Away					
Pld	W	D	L	GF	GA	GD	Pts	W	D	L	GF	GA	GD	W	D	L	GF	GA	GD
38	13	11	14	48	49	−1	50	9	8	2	29	18	+11	4	3	12	19	31	−12

==== Results by round ====
Round	1	2	3	4	5	6	7	8	9	10	11	12	13	14	15	16	17	18	19	20	21	22	23	24	25	26	27	28	29	30	31	32	33	34	35	36	37	38
Ground	A	H	H	A	H	A	A	H	A	H	A	A	H	A	H	H	A	H	A	H	A	A	H	A	H	H	A	H	A	H	H	A	H	A	A	H	A	H
Result	L	W	W	L	W	L	D	L	L	D	L	L	D	L	W	D	W	L	L	W	D	L	D	W	D	W	L	W	L	W	W	W	D	D	L	D	W	D
Position	15	11	6	10	7	9	7	14	14	16	17	19	17	18	17	18	16	17	17	16	17	19	19	17	17	14	17	13	15	14	11	9	11	11	12	13	12	13

Updated to match(es) played on 3 December 2017. Source: Globo Esporte
A = Away; H = Home; W = Win; D = Draw; L = Loss

14 May 1	Cruzeiro	1–0	São Paulo	Belo Horizonte
16:00 UTC-03:00	Ábila 47'	Report		Stadium: Estádio Governador Magalhães Pinto (Mineirão); Attendance: 6,528; Referee: Marcelo de Lima Henrique

22 May 2	São Paulo	2–0	Avaí	São Paulo
20:00 UTC-03:00	Pratto 11'; Luiz Araújo 90+1'	Report		Stadium: Estádio Cícero Pompeu de Toledo (Morumbi); Attendance: 12,427; Referee: Caio Max Augusto Vieira

28 May 3	São Paulo	2–0	Palmeiras	São Paulo
19:00 UTC-03:00	Pratto 62'; Luiz Araújo 84'	Report		Stadium: Estádio Cícero Pompeu de Toledo (Morumbi); Attendance: 33,288; Referee: Anderson Daronco

4 June 4	Ponte Preta	1–0	São Paulo	Campinas
16:00 UTC-03:00	Lucca 50'	Report		Stadium: Estádio Moisés Lucarelli; Attendance: 5,711; Referee: Rodolpho Taski Marques

8 June 5	São Paulo	2–0	Vitória	São Paulo
19:30 UTC-03:00	Thomaz 63'; Pratto 90+2'	Report		Stadium: Estádio Cícero Pompeu de Toledo (Morumbi); Attendance: 12,536; Referee: Rafael Traci

11 June 6	Corinthians	3–2	São Paulo	São Paulo
16:00 UTC-03:00	Romero 6'; Gabriel 40'; Jádson 62' (pen.)	Report	Gilberto 17'; Wellington Nem 83'	Stadium: Arena Corinthians; Attendance: 42,443; Referee: Ricardo Marques Ribeiro

14 June 7	Sport	0–0	São Paulo	Recife
19:30 UTC-03:00		Report		Stadium: Estádio Adelmar da Costa Carvalho (Ilha do Retiro); Attendance: 11,904; Referee: Heber Roberto Lopes

18 June 8	São Paulo	1–2	Atlético Mineiro	São Paulo
16:00 UTC-03:00	Marcinho 46'	Report	Cazares 8'; Rafael Moura 80'	Stadium: Estádio Cícero Pompeu de Toledo (Morumbi); Attendance: 22,704; Referee: Braulio da Silva Machado

21 June 9	Atlético Paranaense	1–0	São Paulo	Curitiba
21:45 UTC-03:00	Wanderson 3'	Report		Stadium: Estádio Joaquim Américo Guimarães (Arena da Baixada); Attendance: 21,436; Referee: Wagner do Nascimento Magalhaes

25 June 10	São Paulo	1–1	Fluminense	São Paulo
16:00 UTC-03:00	Jucilei 6'	Report	Wendel 51'	Stadium: Estádio Cícero Pompeu de Toledo (Morumbi); Attendance: 17,742; Referee: Anderson Daronco

2 July 11	Flamengo	2–0	São Paulo	Rio de Janeiro
16:00 UTC-03:00	Guerrero 37'; Diego 41'	Report		Stadium: Estádio Luso Brasileiro (Ilha do Urubu); Attendance: 17,302; Referee: Leandro Pedro Vuaden

9 July 12	Santos	3–2	São Paulo	Santos
19:00 UTC-03:00	Copete 44', 53', 66'	Report	Shaylon 75'; Arboleda 86'	Stadium: Estádio Urbano Caldeira (Vila Belmiro); Attendance: 10,322; Referee: Sandro Meira Ricci

13 July 13	São Paulo	2–2	Atlético Goianiense	São Paulo
19:30 UTC-03:00	Pratto 57'; Marcinho 83'	Report	Niltinho 65'; Everaldo 85'	Stadium: Estádio Cícero Pompeu de Toledo (Morumbi); Attendance: 31,333; Referee: Marielson Alves Silva

16 July 14	Chapecoense	2–0	São Paulo	Chapecó
16:00 UTC-03:00	Túlio de Melo 62'; Lucas Marques 90+1'	Report		Stadium: Arena Índio Condá; Attendance: 10,742; Referee: Wagner do Nascimento Magalhães

19 July 15	São Paulo	1–0	Vasco da Gama	São Paulo
21:45 UTC-03:00	Pratto 2'	Report		Stadium: Estádio Cícero Pompeu de Toledo (Morumbi); Attendance: 22,574; Referee: Wagner Reway

24 July 16	São Paulo	1–1	Grêmio	São Paulo
20:00 UTC-03:00	Lucas Fernandes 64'	Report	Pedro Rocha 19'	Stadium: Estádio Cícero Pompeu de Toledo (Morumbi); Attendance: 51,511; Referee: Ricardo Marques Ribeiro

29 July 17	Botafogo	3–4	São Paulo	Rio de Janeiro
16:00 UTC-03:00	Marcos Vinícius 19', 25'; Guilherme 68'	Report	Cueva 17'; Marcos Guilherme 83', 90+2'; Hernanes 86'	Stadium: Estádio Olímpico Nilton Santos (Engenhão); Attendance: 17,139; Referee: Andre Luiz de Freitas Castro

3 August 18	São Paulo	1–2	Coritiba	São Paulo
19:30 UTC-03:00	Denílson 88'	Report	Thiago Carleto 56' (pen.); Filigrana 77'	Stadium: Estádio Cícero Pompeu de Toledo (Morumbi); Attendance: 53,635; Referee: Péricles Bassols Pegado Cortez

6 August 19	Bahia	2–1	São Paulo	Salvador
16:00 UTC-03:00	Régis 39'; Mendoza 42'	Report	Hernanes 45+3' (pen.)	Stadium: Arena Fonte Nova; Attendance: 24,517; Referee: João Batista de Arruda

13 August 20	São Paulo	3–2	Cruzeiro	São Paulo
11:00 UTC-03:00	Hernanes 45+2', 82' (pen.); Arboleda 71'	Report	Sassá 50', 56'	Stadium: Estádio Cícero Pompeu de Toledo (Morumbi); Attendance: 56,052; Referee: Rafael Traci

20 August 21	Avaí	1–1	São Paulo	Florianópolis
16:00 UTC-03:00	Junior Dutra 69' (pen.)	Report	Hernanes 79' (pen.)	Stadium: Estádio Aderbal Ramos da Silva (Ressacada); Referee: Leandro Pedro Vuaden

27 August 22	Palmeiras	4–2	São Paulo	São Paulo
16:00 UTC-03:00	Willian 35', 38'; Keno 78'; Hyoran 90'	Report	Marcos Guilherme 12'; Hernanes 45+6'	Stadium: Allianz Parque; Attendance: 33,537; Referee: Sandro Meira Ricci

9 September 23	São Paulo	2–2	Ponte Preta	São Paulo
19:00 UTC-03:00	Hernanes 34'; Bruno Alves 57'	Report	Danilo Barcelos 64'; Léo Gamalho 74'	Stadium: Estádio Cícero Pompeu de Toledo (Morumbi); Attendance: 43,724; Referee: Marcelo de Lima Henrique

17 September 24	Vitória	1–2	São Paulo	Salvador
16:00 UTC-03:00	Tréllez 89'	Report	Éder Militão 52'; Cueva 81'	Stadium: Estádio Manoel Barradas (Barradão); Referee: Rodolpho Toski Marques

24 September 25	São Paulo	1–1	Corinthians	São Paulo
11:00 UTC-03:00	Petros 27'	Report	Clayson 77'	Stadium: Estádio Cícero Pompeu de Toledo (Morumbi); Attendance: 61,142; Referee: Wagner do Nascimento Magalhães

1 October 26	São Paulo	1–0	Sport	São Paulo
16:00 UTC-03:00	Marcos Guilherme 35'	Report		Stadium: Estádio Cícero Pompeu de Toledo (Morumbi); Attendance: 43,071; Referee: Anderson Daronco

11 October 27	Atlético Mineiro	1–0	São Paulo	Belo Horizonte
21:45 UTC-03:00	Fábio Santos 53' (pen.)	Report		Stadium: Estádio Raimundo Sampaio (Independência); Attendance: 17,606; Referee: Heber Roberto Lopes

14 October 28	São Paulo	2–1	Atlético Paranaense	São Paulo
21:00 UTC-03:00	Pratto 59'; Maicosuel 82'	Report	Douglas Coutinho 49'	Stadium: Estádio Municipal Paulo Machado de Carvalho (Pacaembu); Attendance: 25,558; Referee: Marcelo de Lima Henrique

18 October 29	Fluminense	3–1	São Paulo	Rio de Janeiro
21:45 UTC-02:00	Henrique Dourado 22' (pen.); Sornoza 23'; Robinho 84' (pen.)	Report	Shaylon 88'	Stadium: Estádio Jornalista Mário Filho (Maracanã); Attendance: 22,999; Referee: Leandro Pedro Vuaden

22 October 30	São Paulo	2–0	Flamengo	São Paulo
17:00 UTC-02:00	Pratto 13'; Hernanes 39'	Report		Stadium: Estádio Municipal Paulo Machado de Carvalho (Pacaembu); Attendance: 32,965; Referee: Rafael Traci

28 October 31	São Paulo	2–1	Santos	São Paulo
17:00 UTC-02:00	Marcos Guilherme 17'; Cueva 22'	Report	Alison 34'	Stadium: Estádio Municipal Paulo Machado de Carvalho (Pacaembu); Attendance: 40,004; Referee: Anderson Daronco

4 November 32	Atlético Goianiense	0–1	São Paulo	Goiânia
19:00 UTC-02:00		Report	Hernanes 21'	Stadium: Estádio do Governo do Estado de Goiás (Serra Dourada); Attendance: 17,697; Referee: Bráulio da Silva Machado

9 November 33	São Paulo	2–2	Chapecoense	São Paulo
20:00 UTC-02:00	Gilberto 71'; Arboleda 82'	Report	Wellington Paulista 26'; Reinaldo 59' (pen.)	Stadium: Estádio Municipal Paulo Machado de Carvalho (Pacaembu); Attendance: 35,037; Referee: Marcelo de Lima Henrique

12 November 34	Vasco da Gama	1–1	São Paulo	Rio de Janeiro
17:00 UTC-02:00	Caio Monteiro 75'	Report	Marcos Guilherme 39'	Stadium: Estádio Vasco da Gama (São Januário); Attendance: 17,447; Referee: Leandro Pedro Vuaden

15 November 35	Grêmio	1–0	São Paulo	Porto Alegre
19:30 UTC-02:00	Kannemann 32'	Report		Stadium: Arena do Grêmio; Attendance: 22,644; Referee: Rodolpho Toski Marques

19 November 36	São Paulo	0–0	Botafogo	São Paulo
17:00 UTC-02:00		Report		Stadium: Estádio Cícero Pompeu de Toledo (Morumbi); Attendance: 25,711; Referee: Wilton Pereira Sampaio

26 November 37	Coritiba	1–2	São Paulo	Curitiba
17:00 UTC-02:00	Wilson 42' (pen.)	Report	Éder Militão 67'; Matheus Galdezani 71' (o.g.)	Stadium: Estádio Major Antônio (Couto Pereira); Attendance: 38,059; Referee: Anderson Daronco

3 December 38	São Paulo	1–1	Bahia	São Paulo
17:00 UTC-02:00	Brenner 63'	Report	Eder 88'	Stadium: Estádio Cícero Pompeu de Toledo (Morumbi); Attendance: 60,485; Referee: Elmo Alves Resende Cunha
