= 2020 Brazilian floods and mudslides =

Floods in Brazil

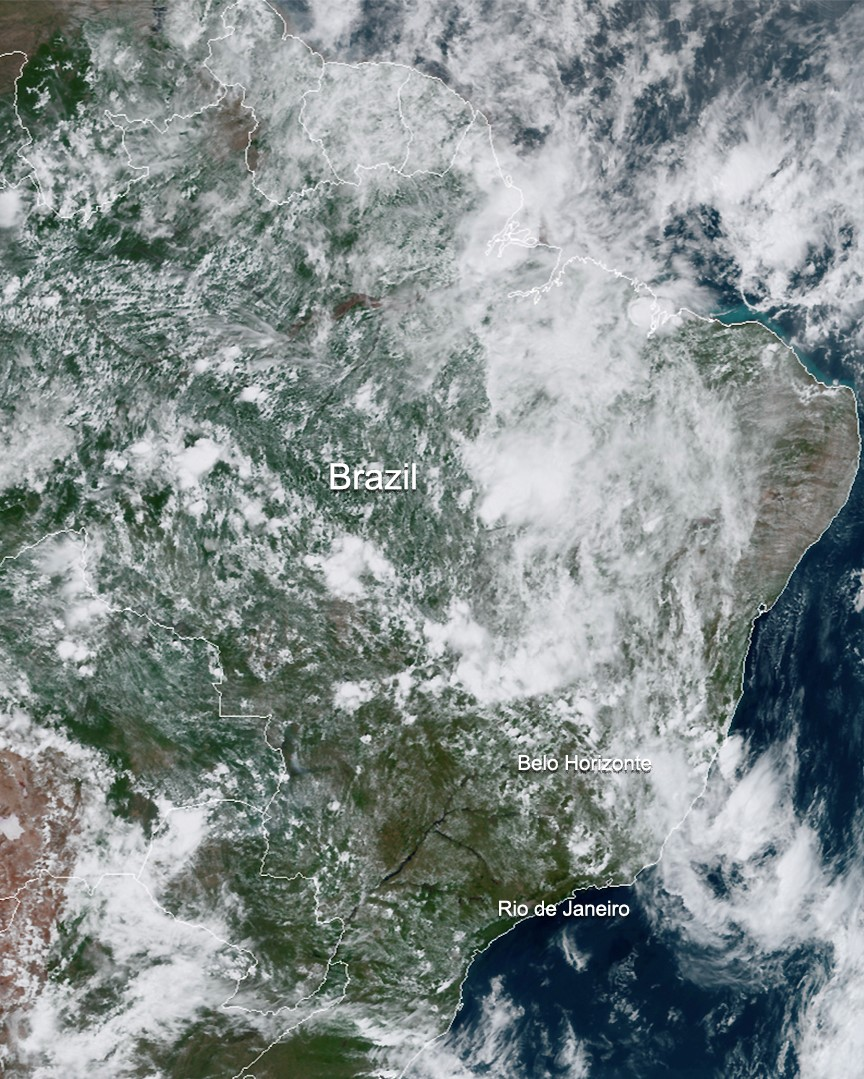
- NOAA satellite imagery shows remnants of the storm over Brazil, taken 27 January 2020
- Date: 17 January 2020–29 January 2020
- Location: Brazil Minas Gerais Espírito Santo Rio de Janeiro
- Deaths: 70

From 17 to 29 January 2020, heavy rainstorms associated with Subtropical Storm Kurumí caused widespread flooding and landslides in Brazil's Southeast Region states of Minas Gerais, Espírito Santo and Rio de Janeiro.

The state capital of Minas Gerais, Belo Horizonte, reported it was the highest rainfall in over 110 years. As of 30 January 2020, at least 70 people had died with 18 still missing, and an estimated 30,000 to 46,500 people had been displaced from their homes. The flooding coincided with the first anniversary of the 2019 Brumadinho dam disaster which killed 270 people.

== Flooding ==
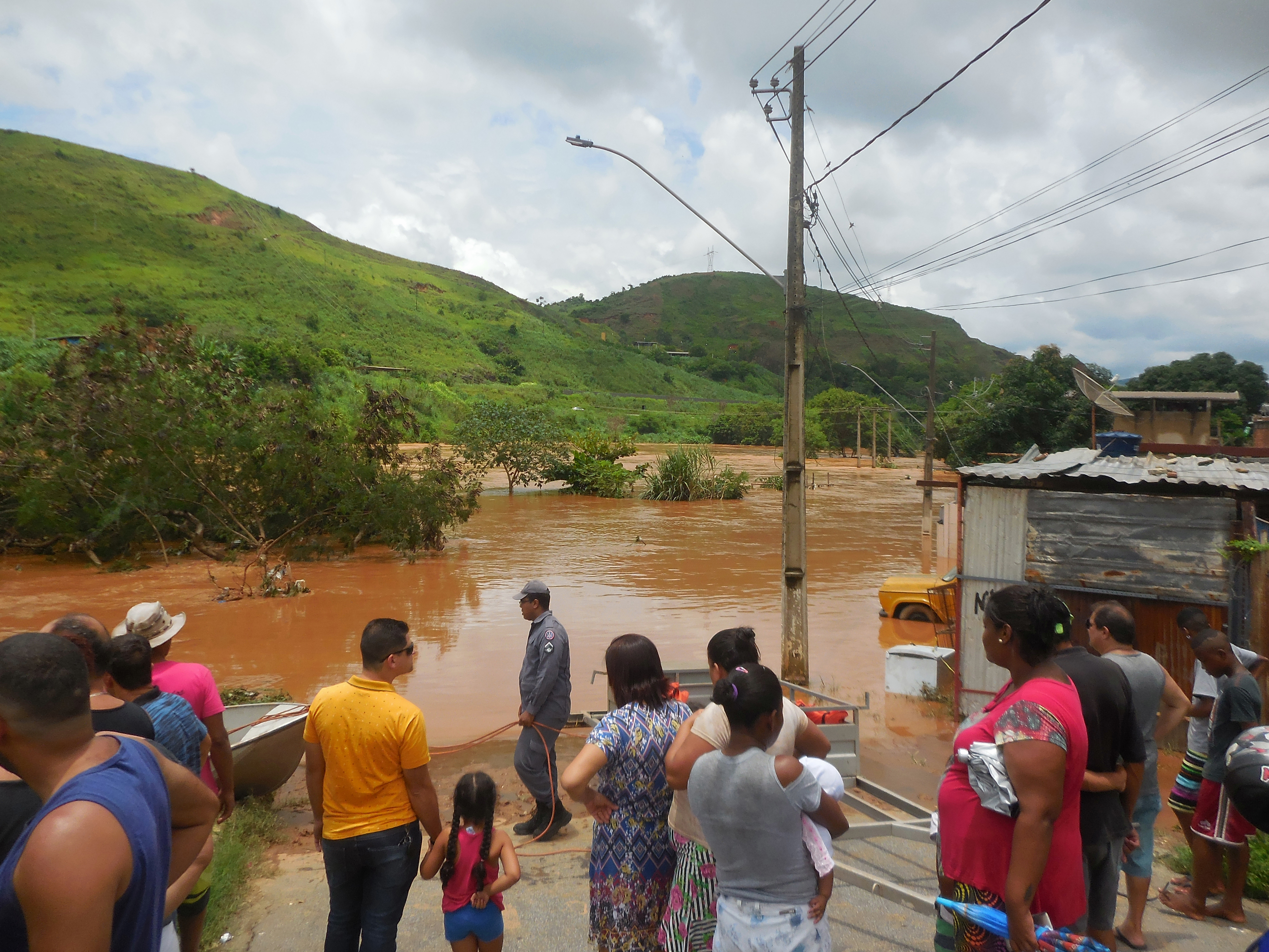
Floods and mudslides in Minas Gerais, Brazil.

Map of heavy rainfall in Espírito Santo in 2020, based on data from the State Civil Defense of Espírito Santo. Municipalities with deaths Municipalities in a state of emergency Municipalities with homeless, missing or buried Municipalities with infrastructure damage Unaffected municipalities

Flooding in Iconha, Espírito Santo.

Heavy rainfall began on 17 January 2020 and led to flash flooding and landslides in the south-east of Brazil, flooding to many houses and neighbourhoods. This was primarily reported in the states of Minas Gerais, Espírito Santo and Rio de Janeiro. By 27 January 2020, the rain had largely subsided but was expected to continue throughout the week. In the state of Minas Gerais, more than 15,000 people were evacuated as a result of the heavy rain and subsequent flooding. 10,000 people were evacuated from Espirito Santo along with 6,000 people from Rio de Janeiro. The city of Belo Horizonte saw 171 mm (6.7 in) of rainfall within a 24-hour period on 23–24 January; this was the highest such measurement in 110 years. Flooding in the city was reported on 29 January and led to the collapse of the roof of a mall.

Reports emerged of several collapsed bridges and damaged roads in rural parts of Minas Gerais. Over 100 cities across the three states declared a state of emergency. Brazilian President Jair Bolsonaro announced the deployment of the Brazilian Armed Forces to the affected regions. Governor of Minas Gerais Romeu Zema stated that the hardest-hit areas were in areas where "people lived in informal and precarious housing". The Brazilian federal government allocated US$20 million for relief efforts in the affected regions while the state government of Minas Gerais allocated up to US$80 million. The United Nations offered its assistance and support to the Brazilian government. On 30 January, President Bolsonaro visited affected parts of Minas Gerais. The large coffee fields of Minas Gerais were largely unaffected by the flooding, according to farmers. Brazil is the world's largest coffee producer. The town of Sabará established vaccination points against Hepatitis A and tetanus in the city, which was heavily hit by the flooding.

Heavy rainfall continued into February and spread towards parts of neighbouring Paraguay. The southern Brazilian regions of Paraná, São Paulo and Mato Grosso do Sul had the highest risks of flooding.

== See also ==
- Subtropical Storm Kurumí
- 2009 Brazilian floods and mudslides
