= Lucas Fernandes =

Lucas Fernandes may refer to:

- Lucas Fernandes (footballer, born 1994), Brazilian football forward who plays in Japan for Cerezo Osaka
- Lucas Fernandes (footballer, born 1997), Brazilian football midfielder who plays in Portugal for Portimonense
