= Ricardo Pinto (footballer, born 1965) =

Brazilian footballer and manager (born 1965)

Personal information
- Full name: Ricardo Pinto
- Date of birth: January 23, 1965 (age 61)
- Place of birth: Iconha, Espírito Santo, Brazil
- Height: 1.84 m (6 ft 0 in)
- Position: Goalkeeper

Youth career
- 1982–1984: Desportiva Ferroviária
- 1984–1987: Fluminense

Senior career*
Years	Team	Apps	(Gls)
1987–1992	Fluminense	85	(0)
1992–1993	Cerro Porteño		
1993	Americano		
1994	União São João		
1994–1995	Corinthians	3	(0)
1995–1997	Atlético Paranaense	43	(0)
1998	Internacional-SP		
1998	Iraty		
1998–1999	Goiás	21	(0)
1999	Joinville		

Managerial career
- 1999: Atlético Paranaense youth team
- 2005: Operário Ferroviário
- 2005–2006: Marcílio Dias
- 2007: J. Malucelli
- 2007–2008: Força
- 2008: Uberaba
- 2008: Lemense
- 2008–2009: Red Bull
- 2010: Serrano-PR
- 2011: Paraná
- * Club domestic league appearances and goals

Ricardo Pinto (born January 23, 1965) is a retired professional association footballer who played as a goalkeeper for several Campeonato Brasileiro Série A clubs and for Primera División Paraguaya club Cerro Porteño. He is the former coach of Paraná Clube.

== Playing career ==
Born in Iconha, Espírito Santo, Pinto's career started in 1982, playing for Desportiva Ferroviária's youth team. After two years in the club, he moved to Fluminense's youth team, where he won the Copa São Paulo de Juniores in 1986. He stayed in Fluminense's youth team until he professionalized in 1987, being promoted to the club's main team.

Ricardo Pinto started his professional career in 1987, joining Fluminense's first team in 1988, playing 85 Campeonato Brasileiro Série A matches for the Rio de Janeiro team, until he left the club in 1992. In 1992 and in 1993, he played for Cerro Porteño, of Paraguay, where he won the 1992 Primera División Paraguaya season. Ricardo Pinto then returned to Brazil, playing for Americano in 1993, União São João in 1994, and Corinthians in 1994 and in 1995, where he played 3 Campeonato Brasileiro Série A matches, and won the Copa do Brasil in 1995 and the Campeonato Paulista in the same year. Ricardo Pinto played 43 Campeonato Brasileiro Série A matches for Atlético Paranaense from 1995 to 1997, and won the Campeonato Brasileiro Série B in 1995. During a 1996 Campeonato Brasileiro Série A match against his former club, Fluminense, at Estádio das Laranjeiras, a supporter of the Rio de Janeiro-based club struck him with a tripod. After the match, Ricardo Pinto was submitted to head surgery. In 1998, he briefly played for Internacional-SP and Iraty, before moving to Goiás, where he played 21 Campeonato Brasileiro Série A matches, leaving the club in 1999. In 1999, he retired while playing for Joinville.

== Coaching career ==
After his retirement, the former goalkeeper opened a football academy in Curitiba, Paraná, and started a managerial career, firstly managing Atlético Paranaense's youth team, then working as the club's goalkeeper coach in 2001. He eventually managed Operário Ferroviário in 2005, and Marcílio Dias in 2005 and in 2006. In 2007, Ricardo Pinto was J. Malucelli's manager, then Força from 2007 to 2008. In 2008, he also managed Uberaba and Lemense.

== Honors ==
Ricardo Pinto won the following honors during his playing career:

Club	Competition	Seasons
Atlético Paranaense	Campeonato Brasileiro Série B	1995
Cerro Porteño	Primera División Paraguaya	1992
Corinthians	Copa do Brasil	1995
Corinthians	Campeonato Paulista	1995
Fluminense	Copa São Paulo de Juniores	1986
