= Shaylon =

Brazilian footballer

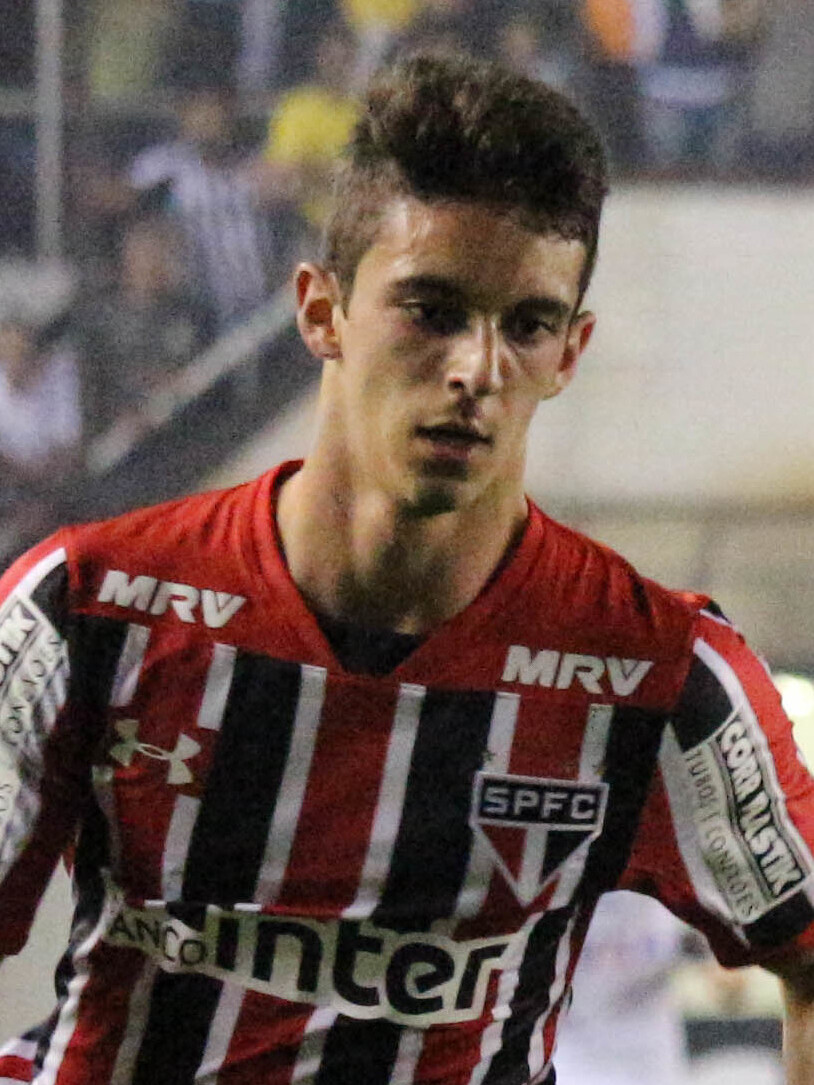

Personal information
- Full name: Shaylon Kallyson Cardozo
- Date of birth: 27 April 1997 (age 29)
- Place of birth: Modelo, Brazil
- Height: 1.78 m (5 ft 10 in)
- Positions: Attacking midfielder; full-back

Team information
- Current team: Mirassol
- Number: 7

Youth career
- 2013–2017: Chapecoense
- 2015–2017: → São Paulo (loan)

Senior career*
Years	Team	Apps	(Gls)
2017–2021	São Paulo	38	(4)
2019	→ Bahia (loan)	16	(4)
2020–2021	→ Goiás (loan)	26	(1)
2022–2025	Atlético Goianiense	159	(26)
2025–	Mirassol	25	(1)
- * Club domestic league appearances and goals as of 9 April 2026

Shaylon Kallyson Cardozo (born 27 April 1997), simply known as Shaylon, is a Brazilian professional footballer who currently plays for Mirassol. Mainly an attacking midfielder, he can also play as a full-back.

== Club career ==
In December 2016, São Paulo FC paid R$500,000 for Shaylon to Chapecoense, and he signed a contract with Tricolor until 2021. Promoted to the first team the following January, he impressed during the pre-season.

On 8 January 2019, Bahia announced that they had signed Shaylon on a season-long loan deal from São Paulo.

=== Club career statistics ===
As of match played 29 March 2024

Appearances and goals by club, season and competition
Club	Season	League			State league		National cup (Note: Includes Copa do Brasil)		Continental		Other		Total	
Club	Season	Division	Apps	Goals	Apps	Goals	Apps	Goals	Apps	Goals	Apps	Goals	Apps	Goals
São Paulo	2016	Série A	0	0	0	0	0	0	3 (Note: Appearances in U-20 Copa Libertadores)	2	9 (Note: Appearances in Copa São Paulo de Futebol Júnior)	1	12	3
São Paulo	2017	Série A	10	2	4	0	1	0	1	0	—		16	2
São Paulo	2018	Série A	14	2	6	0	2	0	1	0	—		23	2
São Paulo	2020	Série A	0	0	2	0	0	0	0	0	—		2	0
São Paulo	2021	Série A	5	0	1	0	2	0	3	0	—		11	0
São Paulo	Total		25	4	13	0	5	0	8	2	9	1	60	7
Bahia	2019	Série A	8	0	8	4	5	0	2	0	7 (Note: Appearances in Copa do Nordeste)	1	30	5
Goiás	2020	Série A	26	1	0	0	0	0	0	0	—		26	1
Atlético Goianiense	2022	Série A	28	3	11	3	7	3	9	3	—		55	12
Atlético Goianiense	2023	Série B	36	4	15	5	2	0	—		—		53	9
Atlético Goianiense	2024	Série A	0	0	14	7	2	1	—		—		16	8
Atlético Goianiense	Total		64	7	40	15	11	4	9	3	—		124	29
Career total			127	12	71	19	11	4	19	5	16	2	244	42

== Honours ==
Bahia

- Campeonato Baiano: 2019

São Paulo

- Campeonato Paulista: 2021

Atlético Goianiense

- Campeonato Goiano: 2022, 2023, 2024
