= Éder Militão =

Brazilian footballer (born 1998)

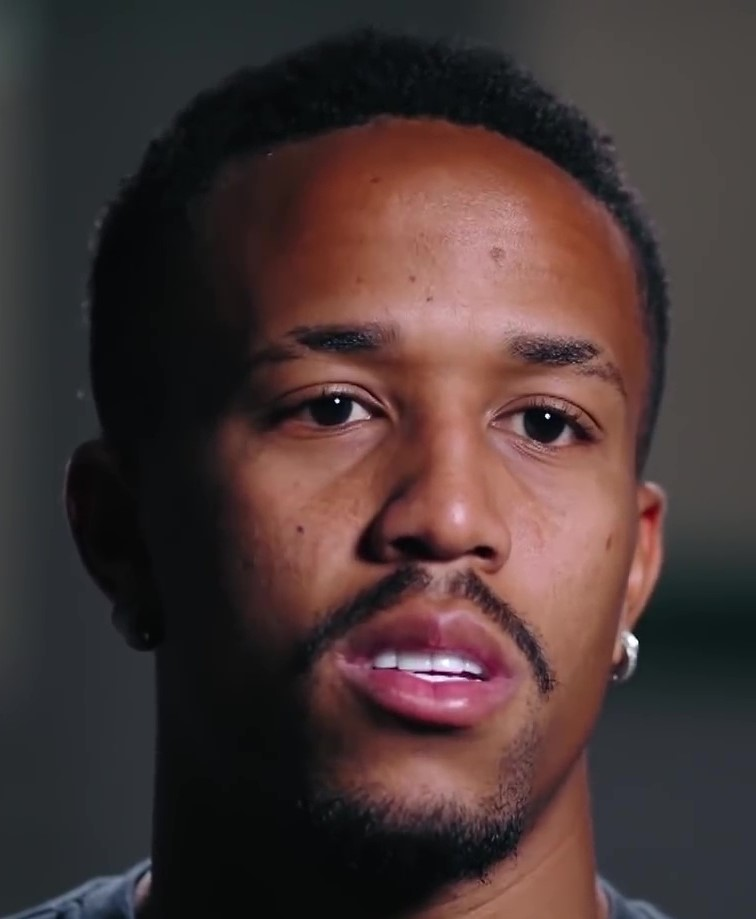
- Militão in 2021

Personal information
- Full name: Éder Gabriel Militão Pinheiro
- Date of birth: 18 January 1998 (age 28)
- Place of birth: Sertãozinho, São Paulo, Brazil
- Height: 1.86 m (6 ft 1 in)
- Position: Centre-back

Team information
- Current team: Real Madrid
- Number: 3

Youth career
- 2010–2017: São Paulo

Senior career*
| Years | Team | Apps | (Gls) |
| 2017–2018 | São Paulo | 49 | (5) |
| 2018–2019 | Porto | 29 | (3) |
| 2019– | Real Madrid | 135 | (10) |

International career^{‡}
| 2015 | Brazil U17 | 5 | (0) |
| 2018– | Brazil | 38 | (2) |
Medal record
Men's football
Representing Brazil
Copa América
| Winner | 2019 Brazil |
| Runner-up | 2021 Brazil |
- * Club domestic league appearances and goals as of 21:10, 18 October 2026 (UTC) ‡ National team caps and goals as of 23:09, 18 November 2025 (UTC)

Éder Gabriel Militão Pinheiro (Brazilian Portuguese: [ˈɛdeʁ miliˈtɐ̃w̃]; born 18 January 1998) is a Brazilian professional footballer who plays as a centre-back for La Liga club Real Madrid and the Brazil national team.

Militão began his career at São Paulo, playing 57 matches over a span of two years before transferring to Porto. In 2019, after one season in Portugal, he joined Real Madrid for a reported transfer fee of €50 million, where he has since won three La Liga and two UEFA Champions League titles.

Militão made his senior international debut for Brazil in 2018. He was part of their squads that won the Copa América in 2019 and came runners-up in 2021, also playing at the 2022 FIFA World Cup and the 2024 Copa América.

== Club career ==
=== São Paulo ===
Born in Sertãozinho, Militão began playing for São Paulo youth squads in 2010. He started in the first team for the 2016 Copa Paulista, and debuted on 2 July in a 2–1 loss at Ituano; the team from the state capital was playing in the tournament for its first time, with an U20 team. He played eleven matches and scored two goals, the first being in a 4–0 home win over Juventus on 18 September that ensured qualification to the second round.

Militão made his professional debut on 14 May 2017 in a 1–0 loss away to Cruzeiro, the opening match for the 2017 Campeonato Brasileiro Série A. He made 22 appearances over the season as the club finished in 13th place, and was sent off on 12 November towards the end of a 1–1 draw at Vasco da Gama. He contributed two goals over the campaign, starting by opening a 2–1 win at fellow strugglers Vitória on 17 September.

Militão made his last appearance for the club on 5 August 2018 when the Tricolor defeated Vasco 2–1 to reach first place in the year's national tournament.

=== Porto ===
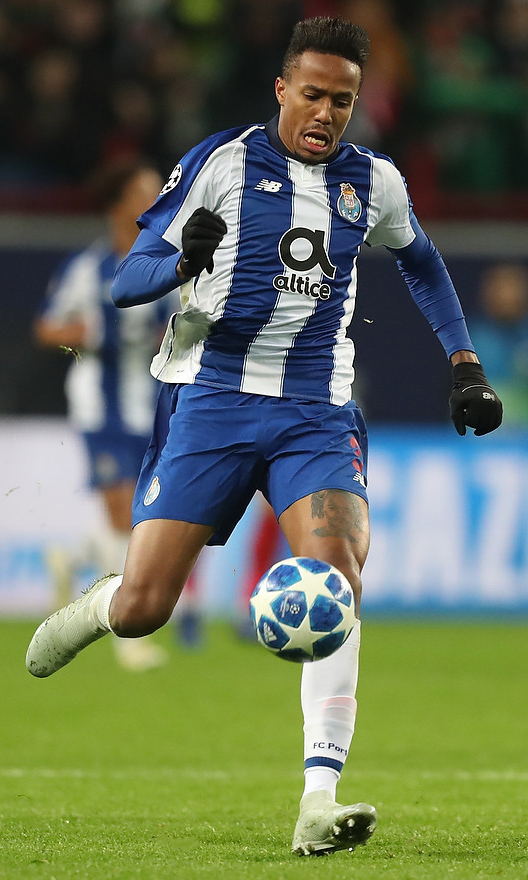
Militão playing for Porto in 2018

On 7 August 2018, Militão signed a five-year contract with Portuguese defending champions Porto. He made his Primeira Liga debut on 2 September, starting in a 3–0 home win over Moreirense and assisting Porto's first goal, scored by captain Héctor Herrera. Over succeeding fixtures, Militão quickly cemented himself in the starting 11 as a centre-back, forming a defensive partnership with teammate Felipe.

On 28 November, Militão scored his first goal for the club in a 3–1 home victory against Schalke 04 for the 2018–19 UEFA Champions League group stage, heading the ball after a cross from Óliver. On 3 January 2019, Militão scored his first league goal, the match's only at Desportivo das Aves. He was named Primeira Liga's defender of the month on four consecutive occasions from September 2018 to January 2019.

=== Real Madrid ===
==== 2019–2021 ====
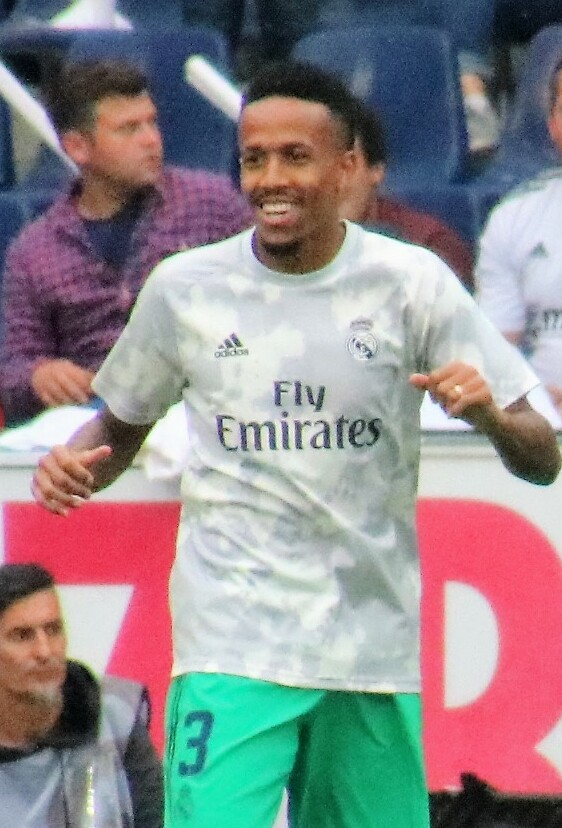
Militão with Real Madrid in 2019

On 14 March 2019, La Liga club Real Madrid announced that they had signed Militão to a six-year contract effective from 1 July 2019, after paying a €50 million transfer fee to Porto. He made his debut on 14 September, coming on as a substitute for Sergio Ramos for the last half-hour in a 3–2 home victory over Levante. He made 15 appearances during the league season as Real Madrid won the 2019–20 La Liga.

Militão scored his debut goal for Madrid on 20 January 2021, heading in Marcelo's cross to open a Copa del Rey last 32 match away to third-tier Alcoyano; his team unexpectedly lost, 2–1. His debut league goal came on 1 May in a 2–0 win over Osasuna.

==== 2021–2022: UEFA Champions League winner ====
In 2021–22, Militão finally became a regular after the exits of veterans Sergio Ramos and Raphaël Varane from the Madrid defence. He partnered Austrian import David Alaba, under the management of Carlo Ancelotti. He scored once in their league-winning campaign, securing a 2–2 home draw with Elche on 23 January. Days earlier, the team won the Supercopa de España with a 2–0 final win over Athletic Bilbao in Saudi Arabia, though he was sent off for giving away a penalty through handball. He made 12 appearances in their victorious Champions League campaign, including the 1–0 final win over Liverpool at the Stade de France.

==== 2022–2023: Major trophies ====
During the 2022–23 season, Militão was a part of the squad won several tournaments. In the 2022 FIFA Club World Cup final, held on 11 February 2023, Real Madrid won 5–3 against Al Hilal. Nine days later against Liverpool at Anfield during the knockout phase first-leg clash, Militão headed a goal as his team overcame a 2–0 deficit to win 5–2. This match was notable for Real Madrid's impressive performance, overturning a 2–0 deficit to secure a 5–2 victory over Liverpool. On 6 May, Real Madrid won the Copa del Rey by defeating Osasuna 2–1 in the final, which took place at the Estadio de La Cartuja. On 10 August, in the UEFA Super Cup, Real Madrid won against Eintracht Frankfurt at the Helsinki Olympic Stadium, a 2–0 victory title.

==== 2023–2024: Injuries and contract extension ====
On 12 August 2023, Militão suffered a torn Anterior cruciate ligament (ACL) in his left knee during the first La Liga game of the season against Athletic Bilbao. This injury led to him being sidelined for the entire season, with a recovery period estimated at nine months.

On 23 January 2024, Militão signed a new contract, running until 2028. His contract gave him a pay raise, as well as adding a €1 billion release clause, the maximum allowed under La Liga regulation. Later that year, on 9 November, he sustained an ACL rupture along with damaged meniscuses in his right leg which would sideline him for the rest of the 2024–25 season.

== International career ==
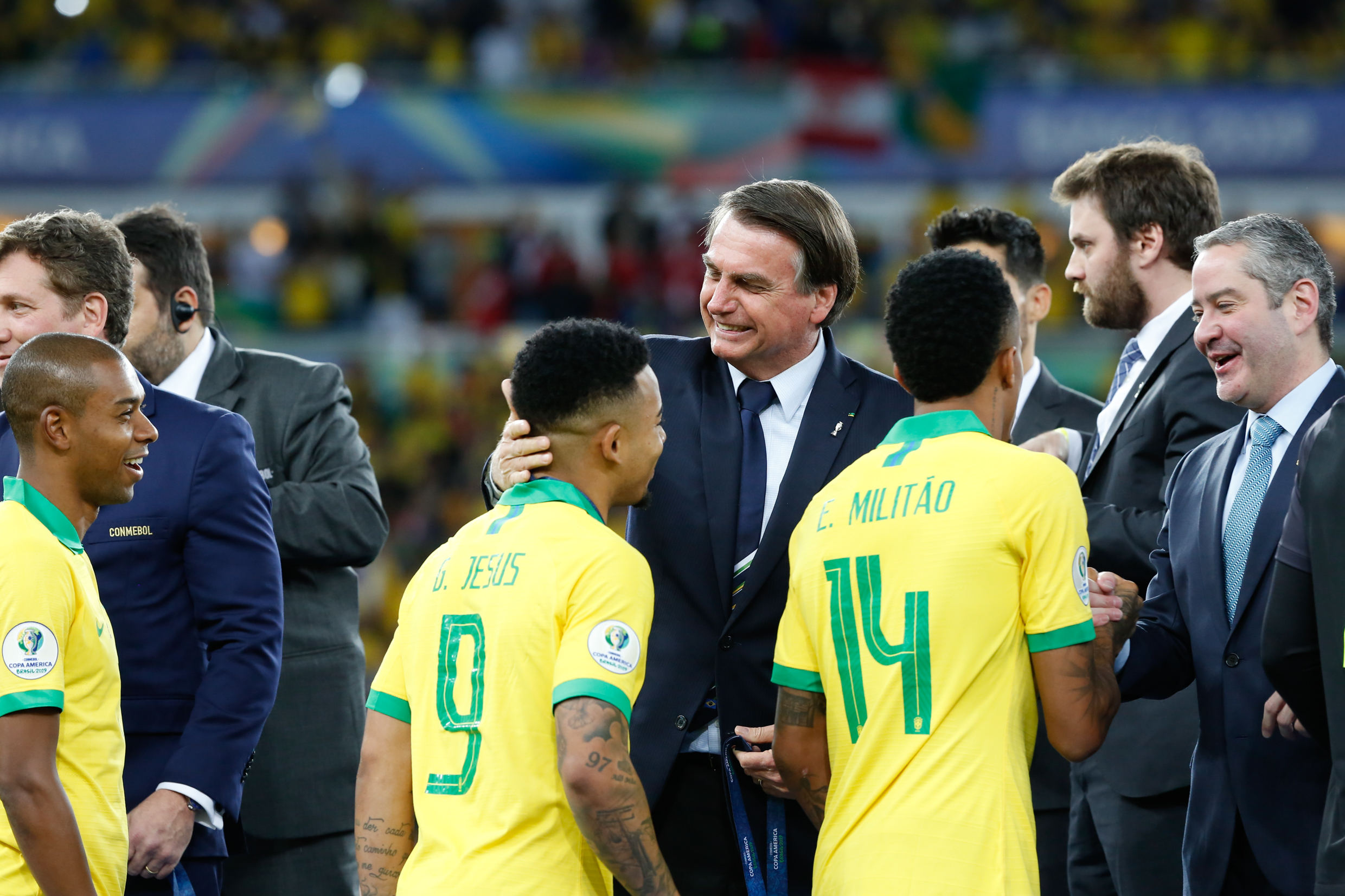
Militão (number 14) shakes hands with President of Brazil Jair Bolsonaro and President of CONMEBOL Alejandro Domínguez after winning the 2019 Copa América

In September 2018, Militão was called up by coach Tite for Brazil's friendlies in the United States against the hosts and El Salvador after Fagner withdrew with injury. He made his debut on 11 September against the Salvadorans at FedExField, playing the full 90 minutes of a 5–0 win.

In May 2019, Militão was included in Brazil's 23-man squad for the 2019 Copa América. In the final against Peru on 7 July, held at the Maracanã Stadium, he made a substitute appearance, coming on for Philippe Coutinho in the second half as his team won, 3–1.

Militão was named for the 2021 Copa América, again on home soil. He started three group games, and in the last one against Ecuador in Goiânia on 27 June, he scored his first international goal to open a 1–1 draw. In the knockout rounds, as Brazil made the final, his spot next to Marquinhos was taken by Thiago Silva.

On 7 November 2022, Militão was named in the squad for the 2022 FIFA World Cup. Unused in the opener against Serbia, he played at right-back in place of the injured Danilo in the 1–0 win over Switzerland in the second group game, and retained his place for the rest of the run to the quarter-finals as the recovered Danilo was placed on the left flank. With qualification already secured, he started in central defence alongside Bremer in a 1–0 loss to Cameroon in the last group game.

== Personal life ==
In June 2021, Militão began a relationship with Brazilian influencer Karoline Lima. In July 2022, they ended their relationship four days before their daughter was born.

In 2023, Militão began dating Brazilian influencer Tainá Castro. In May 2024, they married in a civil ceremony. On 18 July 2025, they held their religious wedding ceremony at the Palácio Tangará in São Paulo, Brazil. On 25 September 2026, Militão and Castro welcomed their son.

== Career statistics ==
=== Club ===
As of match played 4 November 2026

Appearances and goals by club, season and competition
| Club | Season | League | | | State league (Note: Includes Campeonato Paulista) | | National cup (Note: Includes Copa do Brasil, Taça de Portugal, Copa del Rey) | | League cup (Note: Includes Taça da Liga) | | Continental | | Other | | Total | |
| Club | Season | Division | Apps | Goals | Apps | Goals | Apps | Goals | Apps | Goals | Apps | Goals | Apps | Goals | Apps | Goals |
|---|---|---|---|---|---|---|---|---|---|---|---|---|---|---|---|---|
| São Paulo | 2017 | Série A | 22 | 2 | 0 | 0 | — | | — | | — | | — | | 22 | 2 |
| São Paulo | 2018 | Série A | 13 | 1 | 14 | 2 | 6 | 1 | — | | 2 (Note: Appearances in Copa Sudamericana) | 0 | — | | 35 | 2 |
| São Paulo | Total | | 35 | 3 | 14 | 2 | 6 | 1 | 0 | 0 | 2 | 0 | 0 | 0 | 57 | 4 |
| Porto | 2018–19 | Primeira Liga | 29 | 3 | — | | 6 | 0 | 3 | 0 | 9 (Note: Appearances in UEFA Champions League) | 2 | — | | 47 | 5 |
| Real Madrid | 2019–20 | La Liga | 15 | 0 | — | | 2 | 0 | — | | 3 | 0 | 0 | 0 | 20 | 0 |
| Real Madrid | 2020–21 | La Liga | 14 | 1 | — | | 1 | 1 | — | | 6 | 0 | 0 | 0 | 21 | 2 |
| Real Madrid | 2021–22 | La Liga | 34 | 1 | — | | 2 | 1 | — | | 12 | 0 | 2 (Note: Appearances in Supercopa de España) | 0 | 50 | 2 |
| Real Madrid | 2022–23 | La Liga | 33 | 5 | — | | 6 | 1 | — | | 9 | 1 | 3 (Note: One appearance in UEFA Super Cup, two appearances in Supercopa de España) | 0 | 51 | 7 |
| Real Madrid | 2023–24 | La Liga | 10 | 0 | — | | 0 | 0 | — | | 3 | 0 | 0 | 0 | 13 | 0 |
| Real Madrid | 2024–25 | La Liga | 12 | 1 | — | | 0 | 0 | — | | 4 | 0 | 2 (Note: One appearance in UEFA Super Cup, one appearance in FIFA Club World Cup) | 0 | 18 | 1 |
| Real Madrid | 2025–26 | La Liga | 16 | 2 | — | | 0 | 0 | — | | 5 | 0 | 0 | 0 | 21 | 2 |
| Real Madrid | 2026–27 | La Liga | 1 | 0 | — | | 0 | 0 | — | | 1 | 0 | 0 | 0 | 2 | 0 |
| Real Madrid | Total | | 135 | 10 | 0 | 0 | 11 | 3 | 0 | 0 | 43 | 1 | 7 | 0 | 196 | 14 |
| Career total | | | 199 | 16 | 14 | 2 | 23 | 4 | 3 | 0 | 54 | 3 | 7 | 0 | 300 | 23 |

=== International ===
As of match played 18 November 2025

Appearances and goals by national team and year
| National team | Year | Apps | Goals |
|---|---|---|---|
| Brazil | 2018 | 1 | 0 |
| Brazil | 2019 | 7 | 0 |
| Brazil | 2021 | 11 | 1 |
| Brazil | 2022 | 8 | 0 |
| Brazil | 2023 | 3 | 1 |
| Brazil | 2024 | 5 | 0 |
| Brazil | 2025 | 3 | 0 |
| Total | | 38 | 2 |

As of match played 18 November 2025
Brazil score listed first, score column indicates score after each Militão goal

List of international goals scored by Éder Militão
| No. | Date | Venue | Cap | Opponent | Score | Result | Competition | Ref. |
|---|---|---|---|---|---|---|---|---|
| 1 | 27 June 2021 | Estádio Olímpico Pedro Ludovico, Goiânia, Brazil | 13 | Ecuador | 1–0 | 1–1 | 2021 Copa América | |
| 2 | 17 June 2023 | RCDE Stadium, Barcelona, Spain | 29 | Guinea | 3–1 | 4–1 | Friendly | |

== Honours ==
Real Madrid

- La Liga: 2019–20, 2021–22, 2023–24
- Copa del Rey: 2022–23
- Supercopa de España: 2020, 2022
- UEFA Champions League: 2021–22, 2023–24
- UEFA Super Cup: 2022, 2024
- FIFA Club World Cup: 2022

Brazil

- Copa América: 2019
- Superclásico de las Américas: 2018

Individual

- Primeira Liga Team of the Year: 2018–19
- Primeira Liga Player Fair-Play Prize: 2018–19
- La Liga Team of the Season: 2021–22, 2022–23
- ESM Team of the Season: 2022–23
