= Rony Fernandes =

Brazilian footballer

Rony
Personal information
- Full name: Rony Fernandes da Silva
- Date of birth: 18 July 1997 (age 29)
- Place of birth: Cuiabá, Brazil
- Height: 1.92 m (6 ft 4 in)
- Position: Centre-back

Team information
- Current team: Tombense

Youth career
- 2012–2018: São Paulo

Senior career*
Years	Team	Apps	(Gls)
2016–2020	São Paulo	18	(1)
2019–2020	→ CSA (loan)	5	(0)
2020	→ Figueirense (loan)	11	(0)
2020–2021	Louletano	19	(0)
2021–2022	Amora	19	(0)
2023	Democrata-GV	22	(1)
2023	Marcílio Dias	8	(1)
2024	Itabaiana	16	(1)
2024	Tombense	12	(1)
2024	Marcílio Dias	11	(0)
2025–	Tombense	6	(0)
- * Club domestic league appearances and goals as of 20 October 2025

Rony Fernandes da Silva (born 18 July 1997), simply known as Rony or Rony Fernandes, is a Brazilian professional footballer who plays as a centre-back for Tombense.

== Career ==
Trained in São Paulo's youth sectors, Rony played professionally for the first time in 2016 on the B team that competed in the Copa Paulista. In 2018 he played just one game for the main team, against São Bento in the 2018 Campeonato Paulista. He was loaned to CSA in the following years and after the end of his contract, he signed with Louletano of Portugal.

In 2023 he competed in the Campeonato Mineiro for EC Democrata. In October, Rony was announced by Marcílio Dias. On 2 December 2023, Rony signed with Itabaiana. After playing once again for Marcílio Dias, he returned to Tombense in 2025.

== Honours ==
CSA

- Campeonato Alagoano: 2019

Marcílio Dias

- Copa Santa Catarina: 2023
