= Marcinho (footballer, born June 1995) =

Brazilian footballer

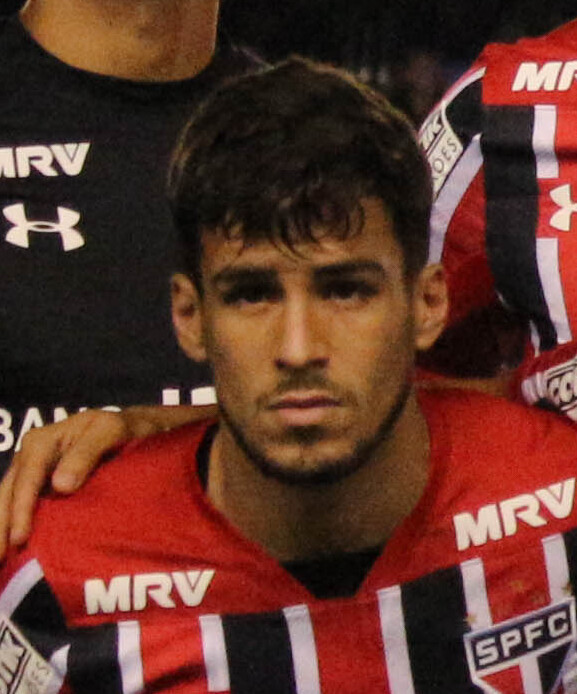
- Marcinho with São Paulo in 2017

Personal information
- Full name: Márcio Antônio de Sousa Júnior
- Date of birth: 8 June 1995 (age 31)
- Place of birth: Itauçu, Brazil
- Height: 1.76 m (5 ft 9 1/2 in)
- Position: Winger

Team information
- Current team: Chapecoense
- Number: 7

Youth career
- 2011–2012: Vila Nova
- 2012–2015: Corinthians
- 2012–2013: → Flamengo–SP (loan)
- 2015: Ponte Preta

Senior career*
Years	Team	Apps	(Gls)
2016	Remo	11	(0)
2017–2018	São Bernardo	10	(1)
2017	→ São Paulo (loan)	22	(2)
2018	→ Atlético Paranaense (loan)	34	(4)
2019–2021	Goiás	26	(2)
2019	→ Sport Recife (loan)	10	(0)
2020–2021	→ Cuiabá (loan)	21	(4)
2021–2022	Botafogo	16	(0)
2021	→ Vitória (loan)	22	(4)
2022–2023	CRB	8	(1)
2022–2023	→ Avaí (loan)	15	(1)
2023	Al-Riyadh	14	(0)
2023–	Chapecoense	134	(19)
- * Club domestic league appearances and goals as of 9 April 2026

Márcio Antônio de Sousa Júnior (born 8 June 1995), commonly known as Marcinho, is a Brazilian footballer who plays for Chapecoense as a winger.

== Club career ==
Born in Inhumas, Goiás, Marcinho represented Vila Nova, Corinthians, Flamengo–SP and Ponte Preta. On 10 March 2016 he moved to Remo, and made his debut on 20 April by coming on as a late substitute in a 2–1 derby away loss against Paysandu for the Copa Verde championship.

A regular starter during the year's Série C, Marcinho signed for São Bernardo on 23 November 2016. He scored his first senior goal on 4 March of the following year, netting his team's second in a 3–1 Campeonato Paulista home win against Audax.

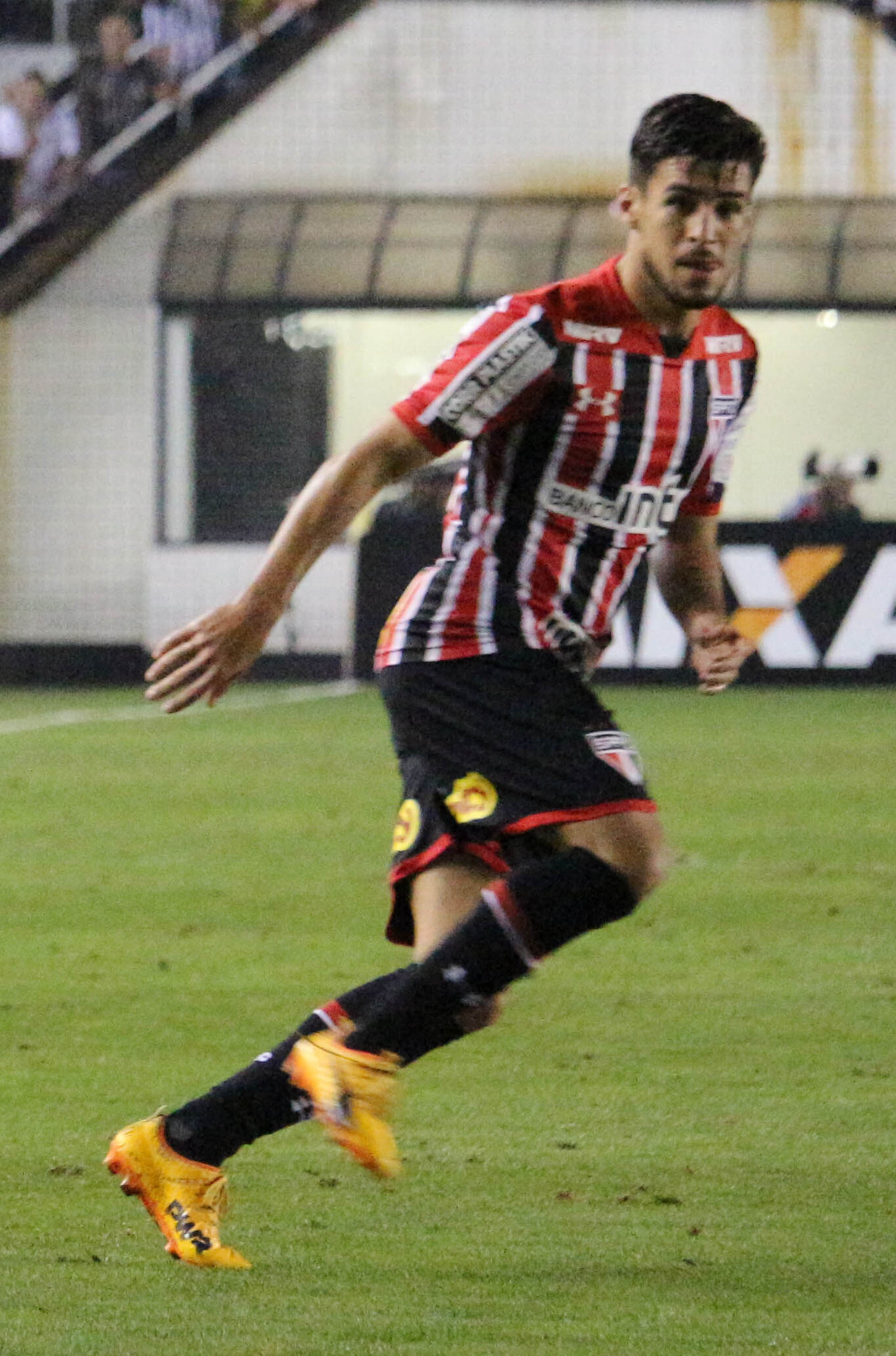
Marcinho in action for São Paulo in 2017

On 10 April 2017, Marcinho was loaned to Série A club São Paulo until the end of the year, with a buyout clause.

On 22 January 2023, Marchinho joined Al-Riyadh.

On 22 June 2023, Marcinho joined Chapecoense.

== Career statistics ==
As of 9 November 2018

Club	Season	League			State League		Cup		Conmebol		Other		Total	
Club	Season	Division	Apps	Goals	Apps	Goals	Apps	Goals	Apps	Goals	Apps	Goals	Apps	Goals
Remo	2016	Série C	11	0	1	0	1	0	—		2 (Note: Appearance(s) in Copa Verde)	0	15	0
São Bernardo	2017	Série D	0	0	10	1	—		—		—		10	1
São Paulo (loan)	2017	Série A	22	2	—		0	0	0	0	—		22	2
Atlético Paranaense (loan)	2018	Série A	20	1	9	2	2	0	3 (Note: Appearance(s) in Copa Sudamericana)	1	—		34	4
Career total			53	3	20	3	3	0	3	1	2	0	81	7
