= Wellington Simião =

Brazilian footballer

Personal information
- Full name: Wellington Simião
- Date of birth: 23 February 1987 (age 39)
- Place of birth: Poços de Caldas, Brazil
- Height: 1.78 m (5 ft 10 in)
- Position: Midfielder

Senior career*
Years	Team	Apps	(Gls)
2007–2009	Caldense		
2009–2010	Buriram United		
2011	São José	0	(0)
2012	Metropolitano	0	(0)
2012	Icasa	6	(0)
2013	Caldense	0	(0)
2013–2014	Guarani	17	(1)
2015	Brusque	0	(0)
2016	Ituano	11	(5)
2016	Vila Nova	10	(2)
2017	Ituano	0	(0)
2017	Avaí	32	(2)
2018	Coritiba	31	(0)
2018	→ Mirassol (loan)	14	(1)
2019	XV de Piracicaba	12	(3)
2020	Brasil de Pelotas	30	(1)

Managerial career
- 2021: Poços de Caldas
- 2022: Passos
- 2023: Luverdense
- * Club domestic league appearances and goals

Wellington Simião (born 23 February 1987) is a Brazilian football coach and former player who played as a midfielder.

== Club career ==
Born in Poços de Caldas, Simião started his professional career in 2007 with Caldense and subsequently represented lower division clubs - Luverdense, Metropolitano, Guarani. He also had a spell with Thai club Buriram United in 2010.

On 16 September 2016, Simião signed for second-tier club Vila Nova after a stint with third tier Ituano. He scored his first goal for the club in a 2–1 defeat against Londrina on 24 September.

After having represented Ituano in local Campeonato Paulista, Simião joined first tier club Avaí in May 2017. In the following month, he suffered a fracture in his face during a match against Atlético-MG for which he had to be operated on.

On 28 December 2017, Simião joined Coritiba Football Club.

== Honours ==
Brusque

- Campeonato Catarinense Série B: 2015
