= Edimar (footballer, born 1986) =

Brazilian footballer

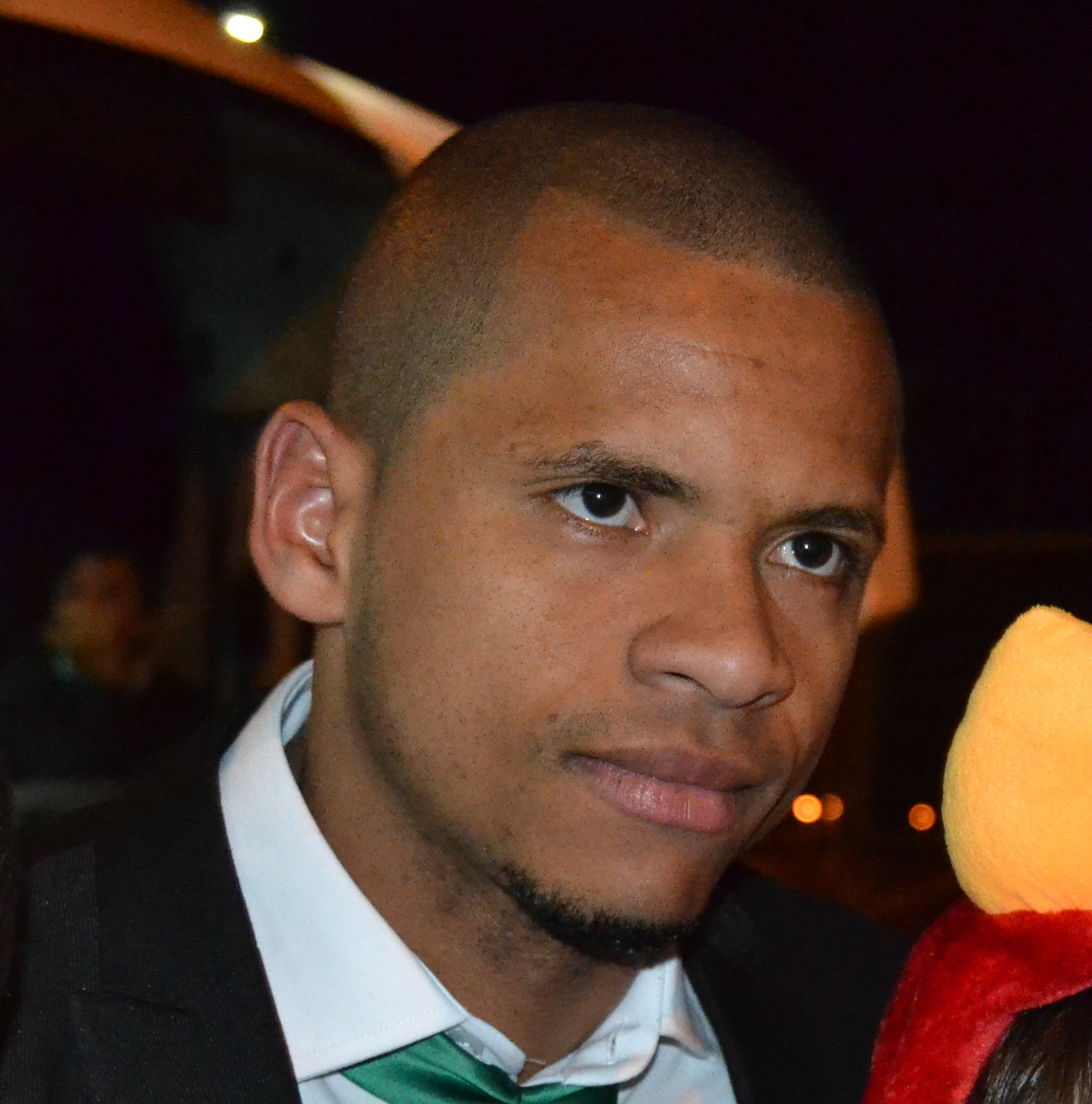
- Edimar in 2015

Personal information
- Full name: Edimar Curitiba Fraga
- Date of birth: 21 May 1986 (age 40)
- Place of birth: Iconha, Brazil
- Height: 1.80 m (5 ft 11 in)
- Position: Left-back

Youth career
- Cachoeiro
- 2001–2006: Cruzeiro

Senior career*
Years	Team	Apps	(Gls)
2006–2009	Cruzeiro	0	(0)
2006	→ Guarani-MG (loan)		
2007–2008	→ Tupi (loan)	13	(1)
2008	→ Ipatinga (loan)	5	(0)
2008–2009	→ Braga (loan)	3	(1)
2009–2014	CFR Cluj	31	(0)
2011–2012	→ Xanthi (loan)	25	(2)
2012–2013	→ Rio Ave (loan)	32	(2)
2013–2014	→ Rio Ave (loan)	32	(1)
2014–2016	Chievo Verona	1	(0)
2015	→ Córdoba (loan)	17	(0)
2015–2016	→ Rio Ave (loan)	34	(2)
2016–2017	Cruzeiro	27	(0)
2017	→ São Paulo (loan)	19	(0)
2018–2019	São Paulo	23	(0)
2019–2021	Bragantino	112	(4)
2022–2023	Vasco da Gama	50	(0)
2023	CRB	17	(0)
2024–	Santo André		(0)
- * Club domestic league appearances and goals as of 21 October 2023

Edimar Curitiba Fraga (born 21 May 1986), simply known as Edimar, is a Brazilian professional footballer who plays as a left-back.

== Club career ==
Born in Iconha, Espírito Santo, Edimar joined Cruzeiro's youth setup in 2003, aged 16, after starting it out at Cachoeiro. In 2006, he was loaned to Guarani, but only appeared in one match during the whole campaign.

In 2008, Edimar played 13 Campeonato Mineiro games for Tupi and scored one goal, before moving to Ipatinga. He appeared in five Série A matches for the latter.

On 1 July 2008 Edimar was loaned to Portuguese Primeira Liga club S.C. Braga, in a season-long deal. He made his debut in the competition on 15 March 2009, starting in a 1–1 home draw against Académica de Coimbra.

Edimar scored his first goal on 24 May, netting his side's only in a 1–1 away draw against FC Porto. He subsequently returned to Cruzeiro in June 2009, but moved to Romanian Liga I side CFR Cluj on 28 July; with the latter he featured regularly over the course of three campaigns, winning both league and cup in 2009–10.

On 3 August 2011 Edimar was loaned to Super League Greece team Xanthi, in a season-long deal. During his spell he suffered with weather, and with racism in a match against PAS Giannina F.C.

On 5 August 2012 Edimar joined Rio Ave F.C., also in a temporary deal. He featured regularly as a first choice, and returned to Cluj in June 2013; however, on 23 July he returned to his previous club, also on loan.

On 4 June 2014 Edimar joined Serie A club A.C. ChievoVerona, after agreeing to a three-year deal. On 7 January of the following year, after featuring in only nine minutes in the league, he was loaned to La Liga's Córdoba CF, until June.

Edimar made his debut in the main category of Spanish football on 12 January, starting in a 1–0 away win against Rayo Vallecano.

On 24 January 2015, in a 1–2 home loss against Real Madrid, Edimar was kicked by Cristiano Ronaldo, which led to the ejection of the latter. He later stated that it was "all forgiven", after a formal excuse was made by Ronaldo in his Twitter.

On 23 March 2017, Edimar was announced at São Paulo on loan.

== Honours ==
Tupi

- Taça Minas Gerais: 2008
- Campeonato Mineiro do Interior: 2008

CFR Cluj

- Liga I: 2009–10
- Cupa României: 2009–10
- Supercupa României: 2010

Rio Ave

- Taça de Portugal runner-up: 2013–14
- Taça da Liga runner-up: 2013–14

Bragantino

- Campeonato Brasileiro Série B: 2019
- Campeonato Paulista do Interior: 2020
