= Jucilei =

Brazilian footballer (born 1988)

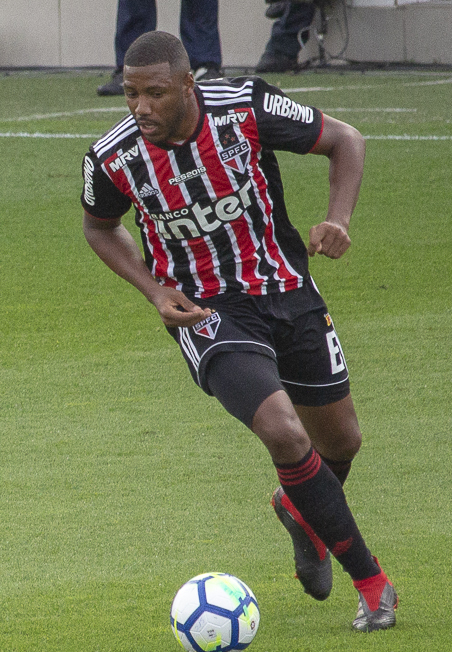
- Jucilei with São Paulo in 2018

Personal information
- Full name: Jucilei da Silva
- Date of birth: 6 April 1988 (age 38)
- Place of birth: São Gonçalo, Brazil
- Height: 1.87 m (6 ft 1 1/2 in)
- Position: Midfielder

Youth career
- Ulbra
- 2007: Grêmio

Senior career*
Years	Team	Apps	(Gls)
2007–2009	J. Malucelli	4	(1)
2009–2011	Corinthians	89	(6)
2011–2014	Anzhi Makhachkala	74	(1)
2014–2015	Al Jazira	35	(3)
2015–2017	Shandong Luneng	43	(1)
2017	→ São Paulo (loan)	45	(1)
2018–2020	São Paulo	49	(0)
2021	Boavista	7	(0)
2022	Atlético Carioca		
Total		344	(13)

International career
2010	Brazil	2	(0)
- * Club domestic league appearances and goals

Jucilei da Silva (born 6 April 1988), known simply as Jucilei, is a Brazilian former professional footballer who played as a central or defensive midfielder.

== Career ==
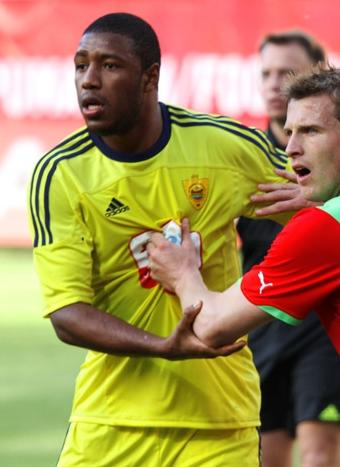
Jucilei with Anzhi in 2011

Jucilei started his career with Malucelli and was transferred to Corinthians after being voted the best player of Malucelli in Paraná State Championship.

He made his debut for Corinthians against Internacional on 10 May 2009, as the team lost 1–0. On 26 July 2010, he was called, by his former Corinthians coach Mano Menezes, to his first appearance for the Brazil national team.

On 22 February 2011, Corinthians president Andrés Sánchez confirmed that big spending Russian side Anzhi had signed Jucilei, in a deal worth €10 million.

After making 99 appearances in all competitions for Anzhi in just under three years, Jucilei moved to Al Jazira in the UAE Arabian Gulf League on 13 January 2014. He acquired Palestine citizenship to be counted as an Asian player, thus avoiding the foreign quota.

On 28 June 2015, it was announced that Jucilei signed with Shandong Luneng in the Chinese Super League. On 1 May 2016, Jucilei scored his first goal for Shandong Luneng in Asian Champions League against Buriram United. He was also awarded for the player of the match.

On 12 February 2017, Jucilei was loaned to São Paulo for one season.

== Style of play ==
According to his former coach Cuca, Jucilei is a great defensive midfielder, "that has technique to advance with the ball and that marks very well." He also can play as centre-back.

== Career statistics ==
Appearances and goals by club, season and competition
Club	Season	League			State league		Cup		League cup		Continental		Other		Total	
Club	Season	Division	Apps	Goals	Apps	Goals	Apps	Goals	Apps	Goals	Apps	Goals	Apps	Goals	Apps	Goals
Malucelli	2009	Série A	—		4	1	—		—		—		—		4	1
Corinthians	2009	Série A	32	2	—		—		—		—		—		32	2
Corinthians	2010	Série A	34	2	16	2	—		—		8	0	—		58	4
Corinthians	2011	Série A	0	0	7	0	—		—		2	0	—		9	0
Corinthians	Total		66	4	23	2	—		—		10	0	—		99	6
Anzhi Makhachkala	2011–12	Russian Premier League	28	1	—		1	0	—		—		—		29	1
Anzhi Makhachkala	2012–13	Russian Premier League	27	0	—		5	0	—		14	1	—		47	1
Anzhi Makhachkala	2013–14	Russian Premier League	19	0	—		0	0	—		5	0	—		24	0
Anzhi Makhachkala	Total		74	1	—		6	0	—		19	1	—		99	2
Al Jazira	2013–14	UAE Pro League	10	1	—		—		3	0	8	1	—		21	2
Al Jazira	2014–15	UAE Pro League	25	2	—		1	0	6	0	1	0	—		33	2
Al Jazira	Total		35	3	—		1	0	9	0	9	1	—		54	4
Shandong Luneng Taishan	2015	Chinese Super League	13	0	—		2	0	—		—		—		15	0
Shandong Luneng Taishan	2016	Chinese Super League	30	1	—		1	0	—		11	2	—		42	3
Shandong Luneng Taishan	Total		43	1	—		3	0	—		11	2	—		57	3
São Paulo (loan)	2017	Série A	35	1	10	0	2	0	—		2	0	—		49	1
São Paulo	2018	Série A	28	0	11	0	5	0	—		2	0	—		46	0
São Paulo	2019	Série A	4	0	6	0	0	0	—		3	0	—		13	0
São Paulo	Total		67	1	27	0	7	0	—		7	0	—		108	1
Boavista	2021	Carioca	—		7	0	1	0	—		—		—		8	0
Career total			283	10	61	3	18	0	9	0	53	4	0	0	424	17

== Honours ==
=== Club ===
Corinthians

- Brazilian Cup: 2009

=== Individual ===
- Campeonato Brasileiro Série A Team of the Year: 2010
- Bola de Prata: 2010
