= Foguete =

Brazilian footballer (born 1996)

Personal information
- Full name: Wellington Cabral Costa
- Date of birth: 1 February 1996 (age 30)
- Place of birth: Itaboraí, Brazil
- Height: 1.70 m (5 ft 7 in)
- Position: Defender

Youth career
- –2012: Vasco da Gama
- 2012–2017: São Paulo

Senior career*
Years	Team	Apps	(Gls)
2016–2018	São Paulo	0	(0)
2017	→ Vila Nova (loan)	7	(0)
2018	→ Santo André (loan)	4	(0)
2019	Cascavel	1	(0)
2020–2021	Kagoshima United	30	(2)
2022–2023	Ventforet Kofu	3	(0)
2024–	Manauara		
- * Club domestic league appearances and goals as of 10:36, 28 June 2020 (UTC)

Wellington Cabral Costa (born 1 February 1996), commonly known as Foguete is a Brazilian footballer.

== Career statistics ==
=== Club ===
As of 28 June 2020.

Club	Season	League			State league		Cup		Continental		Other		Total	
Club	Season	Division	Apps	Goals	Apps	Goals	Apps	Goals	Apps	Goals	Apps	Goals	Apps	Goals
São Paulo	2016	Série A	0	0	0	0	0	0	0	0	11 (Note: Appearances in the Copa Paulista)	0	11	0
São Paulo	2017	Série A	0	0	0	0	0	0	0	0	0	0	0	0
São Paulo	2018	Série A	0	0	0	0	0	0	0	0	0	0	0	0
São Paulo	Total		0	0	0	0	0	0	0	0	11	0	11	0
São Paulo B	2017	–			0	0	0	0	0	0	8	0	8	0
Vila Nova (loan)	2017	Série B	2	0	5 (Note: Appearances in the Campeonato Goiano)	0	0	0	–		0	0	7	0
Santo André (loan)	2018	–			4 (Note: Appearances in the Campeonato Paulista)	0	0	0	–		0	0	4	0
Cascavel	2019	–			1 (Note: Appearances in the Campeonato Paranaense)	0	0	0	–		0	0	1	0
Kagoshima United	2020	J3 League	0	0	–		0	0	–		0	0	0	0
Career total			2	0	10	0	0	0	0	0	19	0	31	0

== Honours ==
=== Club ===
Ventforet Kofu

- Emperor's Cup: 2022
