= Thomaz (footballer) =

Brazilian footballer

Personal information
- Full name: Antonio Thomaz Santos de Barros
- Date of birth: 2 May 1986 (age 40)
- Place of birth: São Paulo, Brazil
- Height: 1.77 m (5 ft 10 in)
- Position: Attacking midfielder

Team information
- Current team: Independiente Petrolero
- Number: 10

Youth career
- 1997–2002: São Paulo
- 2003–2005: Corinthians
- 2005–2006: Clube Atlético Juventus
- 2006: Internacional

Senior career*
Years	Team	Apps	(Gls)
2007	Grêmio Barueri	4	(0)
2007–2009	Chiasso	22	(4)
2009	Avaí	15	(2)
2010	Rio Claro	1	(0)
2010	→ Ventura County Fusion (loan)	13	(6)
2011	Imbituba	15	(5)
2011–2012	Caxias	4	(0)
2011	→ Hercílio Luz (loan)	9	(1)
2012	Marcílio Dias	11	(1)
2012	Audax	4	(0)
2013	Treze	8	(0)
2013	Gurupi	10	(1)
2013	Inter de Lages	13	(7)
2014	Brasiliense	6	(1)
2014–2017	Jorge Wilstermann	99	(24)
2017–2020	São Paulo	19	(2)
2018	→ Red Bull Brasil (loan)	10	(0)
2018	→ Paysandu (loan)	32	(5)
2019	→ Bolívar (loan)	28	(1)
2020	→ Inter de Limeira (loan)	10	(0)
2020–2022	Operário Ferroviário	84	(3)
2022–	Independiente Petrolero	113	(24)
- * Club domestic league appearances and goals as of 30 December 2025

Antonio Thomaz Santos de Barros (born 2 May 1986), commonly known as Thomaz, is a Bolivian nationalized Brazilian professional footballer who plays as an attacking midfielder for Independiente Petrolero.

== Career ==
Thomaz played for Clube Atlético Juventus and Grêmio Barueri in his native Brazil before signing for Swiss club Chiasso in 2007. After spending the 2007–08 season in Switzerland, during which he scored four goals, Thomaz returned to Brazil to play for Avaí.

He moved to the United States in 2010 when he signed for Ventura County Fusion in the USL Premier Development League. Thomaz made his debut for Ventura on 16 July 2010 in a match against the Lancaster Rattlers.

Return to Caxias After the term of the loan, Thomaz returned to the Caxias for the dispute of the Gauchão.

Marcílio Dias Without being taken advantage of at the beginning of the 2012 season, he left the Caxias and was hired by Marcílio Dias the Catarinense Championship sequence.

Treze and Gurupi In 2013, he defended Treze and Gurupi.

Inter de Lages Thomaz was hired by Inter de Lages for the Dispute of the Access Division of the Catarinense Championship. The athlete helped the club to conquer the title of the competition.

After the conquest, Thomaz went to defend Brasiliense.

Jorge Wilstermann in 2014 took the team "aviator" where he was wearing the shirt number 10 and becoming champion of the tournament with the team in the 2016 tournament of the Bolivian League.

On 29 March 2017, on the request of Rogério Ceni, São Paulo paid $130,000 to Jorge Wilstermann to hire Thomaz, who signed a contract with São Paulo for three seasons, receiving a salary of 50 thousand reais a month. On 8 April 2017, on the quarterfinals of Campeonato Paulista, he scored his first goal for his new club, in the win against Linense by 5x0.

Red Bull Brasil On 11 January 2018, he was hired (on loan) by Red Bull Brasil to play the Campeonato Paulista.
