= Iconha =

- Municipality
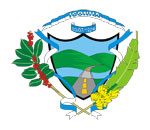
- Flag Coat of arms

- Location in Brazil
- Coordinates: 20°47′34″S 40°48′39″W
- Country: Brazil
- Region: Southeast
- State: Espírito Santo

Area
  - Total: 204 km^{2} (79 sq mi)

Population (2020)
  - Total: 13,973
  - Density: 68.5/km^{2} (177/sq mi)
- Time zone: UTC−3 (BRT)

Iconha is a municipality located in the Brazilian state of Espírito Santo. Its population was 13,973 (2020) and its area is 204 km^{2} (79 sq mi).
