= Lucas Fernandes (footballer, born 1997) =

Brazilian footballer

Personal information
- Full name: Lucas Fernandes da Silva
- Date of birth: 20 September 1997 (age 29)
- Place of birth: São Bernardo do Campo, Brazil
- Height: 1.75 m (5 ft 9 in)
- Position: Midfielder

Team information
- Current team: São Bernardo
- Number: 31

Youth career
- 2011–2016: São Paulo

Senior career*
Years	Team	Apps	(Gls)
2016–2019	São Paulo	45	(2)
2018–2019	→ Portimonense (loan)	29	(1)
2019–2025	Portimonense	59	(3)
2022–2023	→ Botafogo (loan)	44	(4)
2024	→ Cuiabá (loan)	28	(2)
2025	→ AVS (loan)	8	(0)
2025	Juventude	7	(0)
2026–	São Bernardo	12	(1)

International career
2019	Brazil U23	3	(0)
- * Club domestic league appearances and goals as of 18 November 2026

Lucas Fernandes da Silva (born 20 September 1997), known as Lucas Fernandes, is a Brazilian professional footballer who plays as a midfielder for São Bernardo.

== Club career ==
Born in São Bernardo do Campo, São Paulo, Lucas Fernandes joined São Paulo's youth setup in 2011, aged 13. On 15 February 2016, he scored the winner in a 1–0 win against Liverpool Montevideo, as his side was crowned champions of 2016 U-20 Copa Libertadores. Ten days later, he was promoted to the first team by manager Edgardo Bauza.

On 20 March 2016 Lucas Fernandes made his first team debut, coming on as a late substitute for goalscorer Paulo Henrique Ganso in a 1–1 Campeonato Paulista away draw against Ituano. He made his Série A debut on 15 May, scoring the game's only in a 1–0 home win against Botafogo.

On 14 June 2016, Lucas Fernandes suffered a severe knee injury, being sidelined for six months.

On 23 January 2025, Fernandes joined AVS on loan.

== Honours ==
São Paulo

- U-20 Copa do Brasil: 2015
- U-20 Copa Libertadores: 2016

Cuiabá

- Campeonato Mato-Grossense: 2024
