= Bryce (given name) =

Bryce (/braɪs/) is a given name. Notable people with the name include:

== Male ==
- Bryce Aiken (born 1996), American basketball player
- Bryce Alderson (born 1994), Canadian soccer player
- Bryce Alford (born 1995), American basketball player
- Bryce Anderson (born 2004), American football player
- Bryce Archie (born 2004), American football and baseball player
- Bryce Avary (born 1982), American musician, who plays under the name The Rocket Summer
- Bryce Baringer (born 1999), American football player
- Bryce Bayer (1929–2012), American scientist
- Bryce Beeston (born 1947), New Zealand cyclist
- Bryce Bennett (politician) (born 1984), American politician
- Bryce Bennett (alpine skier) (born 1992), American alpine skier
- Bryce Boarman (born 1990), American soccer player
- Bryce Boettcher (born 2002), American football and baseball player
- Bryce Van Brabant (born 1991), American ice hockey player
- Bryce Brentz (born 1988), American baseball left fielder
- Bryce Brown (born 1991), American football running back
- Bryce Brown (basketball) (born 1997), American basketball player
- Bryce Cabeldue (born 2001), American football player
- Bryce Cain (born 2006), American football player
- Bryce Chudleigh Burt (1881–1943), British administrator
- Bryce Callahan (born 1991), American football cornerback
- Bryce Campbell (disambiguation), multiple people
- Bryce Cartwright (born 1994), Australian Rugby League player
- Bryce Chudak (born 1995), Canadian figure skater
- Bryce Cooper (1905–1995), Australian cricketer
- Bryce Cosby (born 1999), American football player
- Bryce Cotton (born 1992), American basketball player
- Bryce Courtenay (1933–2012), Australian-South African novelist
- Bryce Crawford (1914–2011), American scientist
- Bryce Davis (born 1989), American football center
- Bryce Davison (born 1986), American figure skater
- Bryce Dejean-Jones (1992–2016), American basketball player
- Bryce Dessner (born 1976), American composer
- Bryce DeWitt (1923–2004), American physicist
- Bryce Douvier (born 1991), Austrian basketball player
- Bryce W. Drennan (born 1963), American author
- Bryce Drew (born 1974), American basketball coach
- Bryce Duke (born 2001), American soccer player
- Bryce Easton (born 1987), South African professional golfer
- Bryce Edgmon (born 1961), American speaker
- Bryce Elder (born 1999), American baseball pitcher
- Bryce Fisher (born 1977), American football player
- Bryce Florie (born 1970), American baseball player
- Bryce Ford-Wheaton (born 2000), American football player
- Bryce Foster (born 2002), American football player
- Bryce Fullwood (born 1998), Australian racing driver
- Bryce Fulton (1935–1976), Scottish footballer
- Bryce Gaudry (1942–2019), Australian politician
- Bryce Gibbs (disambiguation), multiple people
- Bryce Goggin, American record producer
- Bryce Gray (1827–1897), Scottish-American merchant
- Bryce Hager (born 1992), American football linebacker
- Bryce Hall (American football) (born 1997), American football cornerback
- Bryce Hall (internet personality) (born 1999), American internet celebrity
- Bryce Hallett (born 1976), Canadian animator
- Bryce Hamilton (born 2000), American basketball player
- Bryce Harland (1931–2006), New Zealand diplomat
- Bryce Harlow (1916–1987), American congressional staff member
- Bryce Harper (born 1992), American baseball player
- Bryce Harris (born 1989), American football offensive tackle
- Bryce Hawthorne (born 2005), American football defensive tackle
- Bryce Heem (born 1989), New Zealand rugby player
- Bryce Hegarty (born 1992), Australian rugby union footballer
- Bryce Hirschberg (born 1990), American film director
- Bryce G. Hoffman (born 1969), American author
- Bryce Hoppel (born 1997), American middle-distance runner
- Bryce Hosannah (born 1999), English footballer
- Bryce Hubbart (born 2001), American baseball player
- Bryce Hudson (born 1979), American painter
- Bryce Huff (born 1997), American football defensive end
- Bryce Hunt (born 1982), American swimmer
- Bryce Ives (born 1983), Australian theatre director
- Bryce Jacobs, Australian composer
- Bryce Janey, American blues rock musician
- Bryce Jarvis (born 1997), American baseball player
- Bryce Johnson (born 1977), American actor
- Bryce Johnson (baseball) (born 1995), American baseball player
- Bryce Jordan (1924–2016), American musicologist
- Bryce Kanights, American photographer
- Bryce Kendrick (born 1933), English biologist
- Bryce Lampman (born 1982), American ice hockey player
- Bryce Lance (born 2002), American football player
- Bryce Lawrence (born 1970), New Zealand referee
- Bryce Lindores (born 1986), Australian Paralympic tandem cyclist
- Bryce Louie (born 2002), American fencer
- Bryce Love (born 1997), American football player
- Bryce Mackasey (1921–1999), Canadian politician
- Bryce Marion (born 1996), American soccer player
- Bryce Marlatt (born 1977), American politician
- Bryce McCall (born 1988), Canadian football defensive back
- Bryce McGain (born 1972), Australian cricketer
- Bryce McGowens (born 2002), American basketball player
- Bryce Meredith (born 1995), American freestyle wrestler and graduated folkstyle wrestler
- Bryce Miller (racing driver) (born 1982), American racing driver
- Bryce Miller (baseball) (born 1998), American baseball pitcher
- Bryce Mitchell (born 1994), American mixed martial artist
- Bryce Molder (born 1979), American professional golfer
- Bryce Moon (born 1986), South African football player
- Bryce Mortlock (1921–2004), Australian architect
- Bryce Napier (born 1999), American racing driver
- Bryce Oliver (born 2000), American football player
- Bryce Papenbrook (born 1986), American voice actor
- Bryce Parsons (born 2001), South African cricketer
- Bryce Paup (born 1968), former American football player
- Bryce Peila (born 1990), American football player
- Bryce Perkins (born 1996), American football player
- Bryce Petty (born 1991), American football quarterback
- Bryce Pinkham (born 1982), American actor
- Bryce Poe II (1924–2000), American Air Force four-star general
- Bryce Postles (1931–2011), New Zealand cricketer
- Bryce Quigley (born 1992), American football offensive tackle
- Bryce Reeve (born 1968), American professor
- Bryce Reeves (born 1966), American senator
- Bryce Retzlaff (born 1991), Australian rules football player
- Bryce Robins (rugby union, born 1980) (born 1980), New Zealand-Japanese rugby union player
- Bryce Robins (rugby union, born 1958), New Zealand rugby union player
- Bryce Rohde (1923–2016), Australian jazz pianist
- Bryce Rope (1923–2013), New Zealand rugby union coach
- Bryce Salvador (born 1976), Canadian ice hockey defenceman
- Bryce Shapley (born 1974), New Zealand cyclist
- Bryce Soderberg (born 1980), Canadian musician
- Bryce B. Smith (1878–1962), American mayor
- Bryce J. Stevens (born 1957), New Zealand writer
- Bryce Street (born 1998), Australian cricketer
- Bryce Stringam (1920–2000), Canadian politician
- Bryce Sweeting (born 1994), Canadian lacrosse player
- Bryce Taylor (disambiguation), multiple people
- Bryce Thompson (basketball) (born 2002), American basketball player
- Bryce Thompson (American football) (born 1999), American football player
- Bryce Treggs (born 1994), American football wide receiver
- Bryce Vine (born 1988), American rapper
- Bryce Vissel, Australian neuroscientist
- Bryce Walmsley (1881–1930), Australian politician
- Bryce Walton (1918–1988), American fiction writer
- Bryce Wandler (born 1979), Canadian former professional ice hockey goaltender
- Bryce Washington (born 1996), American basketball player
- Bryce Williams (disambiguation), multiple people
- Bryce Wilson (born 1972), American record producer
- Bryce Young (born 2001), American football player
- Bryce Zabel (born 1954), American television producer

== Female ==
- Bryce Dallas Howard (born 1981), American actress
- Bryce Wettstein (born 2004), American skateboarder

== Fictional characters ==
- Bryce Fowler (né McHenry), a character from the animated series Hit-Monkey
- Bryce Montrose, a character in the video game Bully
- Bryce Quinlan, a character from the novel series Crescent City
- Dr. Bryce Varley, a character from the TV series FlashForward
- Bryce Walker, a character from the novel and Netflix series 13 Reasons Why
- Bryce, a character from the Adventure Time episode "Jermaine"
- Bryce or Bebryce, Danaid in Greek Mythology
- Bryce Whitingale, a character from the video game series Inazuma Eleven

== See also ==
- Brice (disambiguation), include listing of people with given name Brice
- Bryce (surname)
- Bryce (disambiguation)
