= Bryce (surname) =

Bryce /braɪs/, which derives from personal name Brice, the Latin form "Bricius," is a surname of Celtic origin which may denote membership of Sept Bryce, a sept of Clan MacFarlane. After the Norman Conquest in 1066, Bryce spread to England and Scotland, where it left a notable mark. Bryce may also refer to:

- A. Catrina Bryce (born 1956), Scottish electrical engineer
- Alfredo Bryce (born 1939), a Peruvian author
- Colette Bryce (born 1970), a Northern Irish poet
- Ebenezer Bryce (1830–1913), an American pioneer best known as the person for whom Bryce Canyon National Park was named
- Elizabeth Bryce (died 1532), mistress of Henry VIII of England and self-proclaimed "witch and prophetess", arrested for treason
- George Bryce (1844–1931), Canadian Presbyterian minister and author
- Isabel Graham Bryce (1902–1997), British public servant
- Jabez Bryce (1935–2010), Tongan leader in the Anglican Church; Bishop of Polynesia
- James Bryce (Belfast) (1806–1877), Irish naturalist and geologist
- James Bryce, 1st Viscount Bryce (1838–1922), was a British jurist, historian, and politician
- James W. Bryce (1880–1949), American engineer and inventor
- Jane Bryce (born 1951), British writer, journalist, literary and cultural critic,
- John Bryce (1833–1913), New Zealand politician; member of parliament and government minister
- John Bryce (born 1934), Scottish television producer
- John Annan Bryce (1841–1923), Scottish politician
- Kathryn Bryce (born 1997), a cricketer in Scotland women's national cricket team, first Scot's cricketer in the top ten of the ICC Women's Player Rankings
- Lloyd Bryce (1851–1917), American politician from New York; U.S. representative 1887–89
- Marion Bryce (1839-1920), Scottish-born Canadian educator and community leader
- Marjery Bryce (1891–1973), British suffragette and actor
- Peter Bryce (1853–1932), Canadian public health physician
- Quentin Bryce (born 1942), Australian former Governor of Queensland; former Governor-General of Australia
- Robert Bryce (1910–1997), Canadian civil servant
- Robert Bryce (writer) (born 1960), American journalist and author
- Sarah Bryce (born 2000), cricketer in Scotland women's national cricket team
- Scott Bryce (born 1958), American film and television actor
- Sherry Bryce (1946–2025), American country singer
- Soren Bryce, an American electronic musician
- Steven Bryce (born 1977), Costa Rican football player
- Thomas Hastie Bryce (1862–1946), Scottish anatomist and archaeologist
- Tom Bryce (born 2003), British rower
- Trevor R. Bryce (born 1940), Hittitologist and historian of antiquity
- William Bryce (1888–1963), Canadian politician from Manitoba

== See also ==
- Bryce (given name)
- Bryce (disambiguation)
