= Brice (surname) =

Brice is a surname. Notable people with the surname include:

- Alfred Brice (1871–1938), Welsh international rugby union player
- Andrew Brice (writer) (1690–1773), English printer and writer
- Antoine Brice (1752–1817), Belgian painter
- Austin Brice (born 1992), American baseball player
- Benjamin Brice (1809–1892), lawyer and soldier who served in the United States Army during the Black Hawk War and Mexican–American War
- Calvin S. Brice (1845–1898), American politician from Ohio
- Carol Brice (1918–1985), American contralto singer
- Denise Brice (1928–2025), French paleontologist
- Edward Brice or Bryce (c. 1569–1636), Scottish Presbyterian minister
- Elizabeth Brice (1957–2011), therapeutic cannabis activist who wrote as Clare Hodges
- Fanny Brice (1891–1951), American model, comedian, singer, theater and film actress
- Fiona Brice, English composer, orchestral arranger and violinist
- Fred Brice (1887–1967), American football, basketball and baseball coach
- Gary Brice (born 1948), Australian rules football player
- Gordon Brice (1924–2003), English cricketer and footballer
- Ignace Brice (1795–1866), Belgian painter
- James Brice (1746–1801), American planter, lawyer, and politician from Maryland
- John Brice Jr. (1705–1766), early American settler and Loyalist politician in colonial Maryland
- John Brice III (1738–1820), American lawyer, businessman, and political leader from Maryland
- John J. Brice (1842–1912), United States Navy officer, U.S. Commissioner of Fish and Fisheries (1896–1898)
- Lee Brice (born 1979), American country music singer
- Liz May Brice, English actress
- Pierre Brice (1929–2015), French actor
- Pierre-François Brice (1714–1794), French artist
- Rachel Brice, American contemporary performer and dancer
- Russell Brice (born 1952), New Zealand mountaineer
- Sally Brice-O'Hara, American Coast Guard admiral
- Sian Brice (born 1969), British triathlete
- Stan Brice (1880–1959), New Zealand cricketer
- Susan Brice, Canadian politician
- Thomas Brice, several people
- William Brice (disambiguation), several people

== See also ==
- Brice (disambiguation)
- Bryce (given name)
- Bryce (surname)
