= Bryce commission =

The Bryce Commission may refer to

- Royal Commission on Corporate Concentration, a 1975–1978 Canadian Royal Commission headed by Robert Broughton Bryce

Or, one of three investigations led by James Bryce, 1st Viscount Bryce:

- Royal Commission on Secondary Education, an 1895 Royal Commission
- Bryce Commission (House of Lords reform), a commission in the United Kingdom which in 1918 reported on House of Lords reform
- Committee on Alleged German Outrages, a World War I commission also headed by Viscount Bryce
