= Brychta =

Brychta (feminine: Brychtová) is a Czech surname, derived from the given name Brikcius (Czech form of Bricius). A similar surname with the same origin is Brichta. Notable people with the surname include:

- Alex Brychta (born 1956), British illustrator
- Edita Brychta (born 1961), Czech-born British actress
- Jaroslava Brychtová (1924–2020), Czech artist

== See also ==
- Brejcha, Czech surname probably with the same origin
