= Brichta =

Brichta (feminine: Brichtová) is a Czech surname, derived from the given name Brikcius (Czech form of Bricius). A similar surname with the same origin is Brychta. Notable people with the surname include:

- Adriana Esteves, full name Adriana Esteves Agostinho Brichta (born 1969), Brazilian actress
- Aleš Brichta (born 1959), Czech singer, songwriter and artist
- Vladimir Brichta (born 1976), Brazilian actor

== See also ==
- Brejcha, Czech surname probably with the same origin
