= Mabel Tuke =

British suffragette

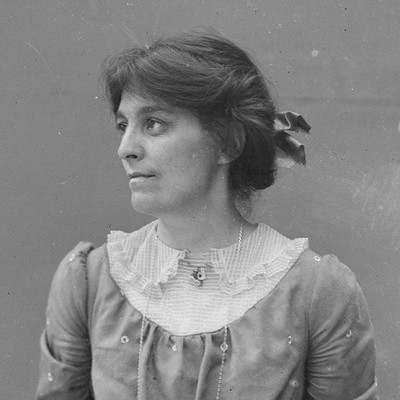
- Tuke in 1909
- Born: Mabel Kate Lear; 19 May 1871; Plumstead, London, England
- Died: 22 November 1962 (aged 91); Neville's Cross, Durham, England
- Other name: "Pansy"
- Employer: WSPU
- Known for: Leading suffragette
- Spouse: George Moxley Tuke

Mabel Kate Tuke, born Mabel Kate Lear (19 May 1871 – 22 November 1962) was a British suffragette known for her role of honorary secretary of the militant Women's Social and Political Union (WSPU).

== Life ==
Tuke was born in Plumstead in London in 1871. In 1901, she married George Moxley Tuke who had died by 1905.

Tukw was good friends with Emmeline Pethick-Lawrence who introduced her to the Manchester based WSPU, which had been founded by Emmeline Pankhurst in 1903. The WSPU were opening a branch in London and in time their headquarters would move there. From 1906, Tuke was appointed the honorary secretary of the WSPU.

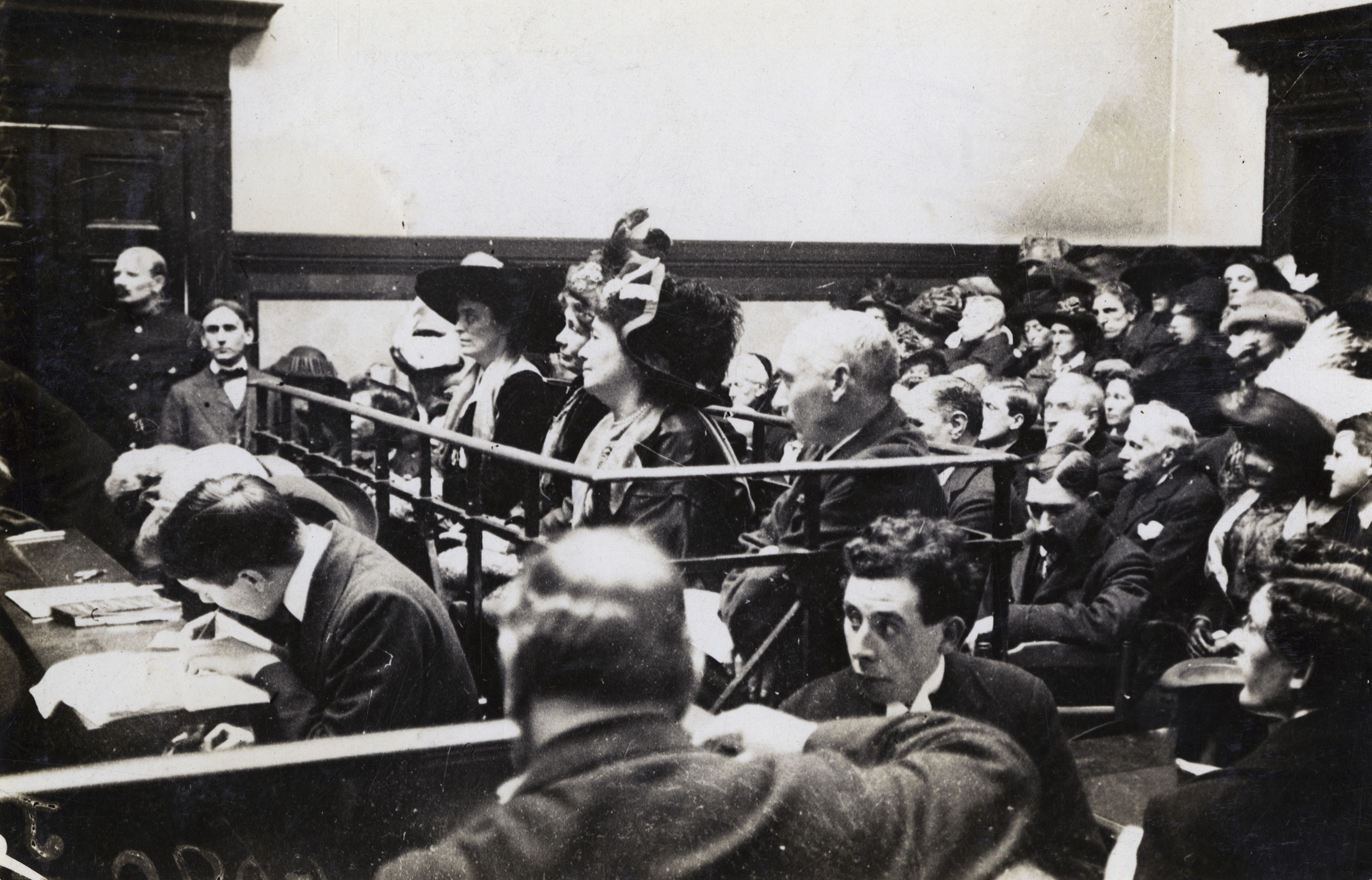
Frederick and Emmeline Pethick Lawrence, Emmeline Pankhurst and Tuke in Bow street court in 1912

Emmeline Pankhurst resisted efforts to remove her absolute authority. In 1907 a group of members led by Teresa Billington-Greig called for more democracy at the WSPU's annual meetings. Pankhurst admitted to being autocratic. She announced at a WSPU meeting that the constitution was void and cancelled the annual meetings. She declared that a small committee chosen by the members in attendance in 1907 be allowed to co-ordinate WSPU activities. Emmeline and Christabel Pankhurst were chosen together with Tuke and Emmeline Pethick Lawrence. Several WSPU members, including Billington-Greig and Charlotte Despard, subsequently broke with the organisation, quitting to form the Women's Freedom League (WFL).

Tuke was with the Pankhursts and Pethick-Lawrence near the head of the forty thousand Women's Coronation Procession, following Marjery Bryce as Joan of Arc, portraying the range of women's suffrage groups and notable historical women through London on 17 June 1911. Following a campaign of stone-throwing a warrant was made for the arrest of Emmeline and Christabel Pankhurst, the Pethick-Lawrences and Tuke. Emmeline Pankhurst and Tuke were already under arrest as they and Kitty Marshall had thrown a stone through a window of 10 Downing Street. Christabel managed to flee to Paris, France, but the Pethick-Lawrences were arrested at WSPU headquarters. On 28 March 1912 they were committed to be tried at the Old Bailey on the charge of "conspiracy." She was dismissed from the trial on 4 April 1912.

The next argument at the WSPU involved the Pankhurst's decision to increase the militancy. The Pethick-Lawrences disagreed and were ejected from the WSPU. As Emmeline Pethick-Lawrence had been the person who had introduced Tuke to the WSPU, Tuke took her leave and went on a convalescent journey to South Africa. In 1925 Tuke and the Pankhurst's created an ill fated tea shop in the South of France at Juan-les-Pins. The tea shop was launched with mainly Tuke's money and she did the baking. The "English Tea Shop of Good Hope" soon closed.

Tuke died in Neville's Cross near Durham in 1962.
