= Pine Valley, Washington County, Utah =

Census-designated place in Utah, United States

Pine Valley, Utah
- Census-designated place
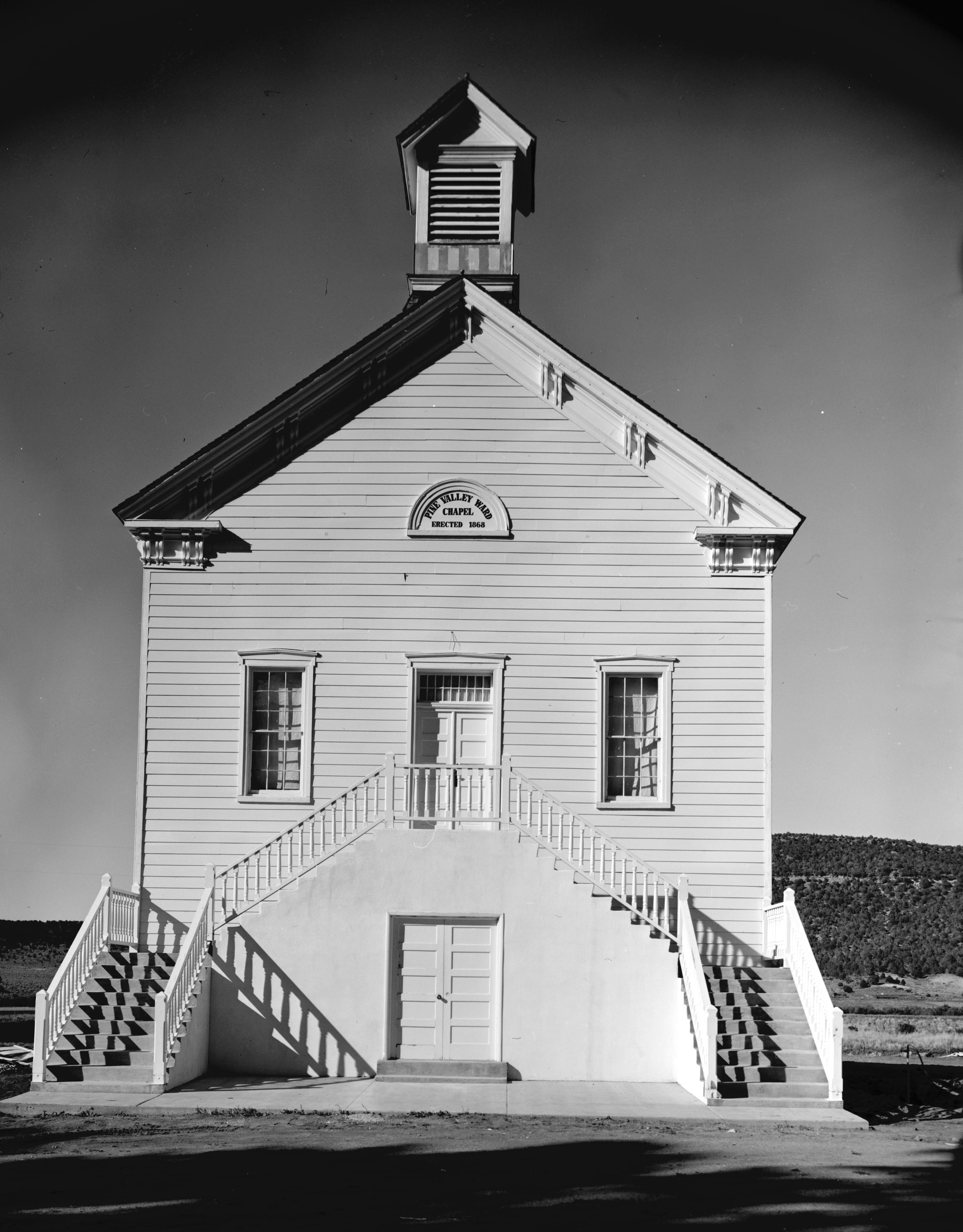
- The Pine Valley Chapel, August 1968

- Location in Washington County and the state of Utah
- Coordinates: 37°23′37″N 113°30′24″W
- Country: United States
- State: County
- Settled: 1855
- Elevation: 6,542 ft (1,994 m)

Population (2020)
  - Total: 249
- Time zone: UTC-7 (Mountain (MST))
  - Summer (DST): UTC-6 (MDT)
- ZIP code: 84781
- Area code: 435
- GNIS feature ID: 2629953
- Website: http://pinevalleyutah.org/

Pine Valley is a census-designated place in north-central Washington County, Utah, United States that lies approximately 45 minutes north of the county seat, St. George. It is located at the head of the Santa Clara River in the Pine Valley Mountains, and was settled in 1859. The population was 249 at the 2020 census.

Significant landmarks include the Pine Valley Ward Chapel of the Church of Jesus Christ of Latter-day Saints designed by shipbuilder Ebenezer Bryce in 1868 using the scheme of an upside-down boat. Pine Valley Chapel is the oldest Mormon chapel in continuous use.

== Demographics ==
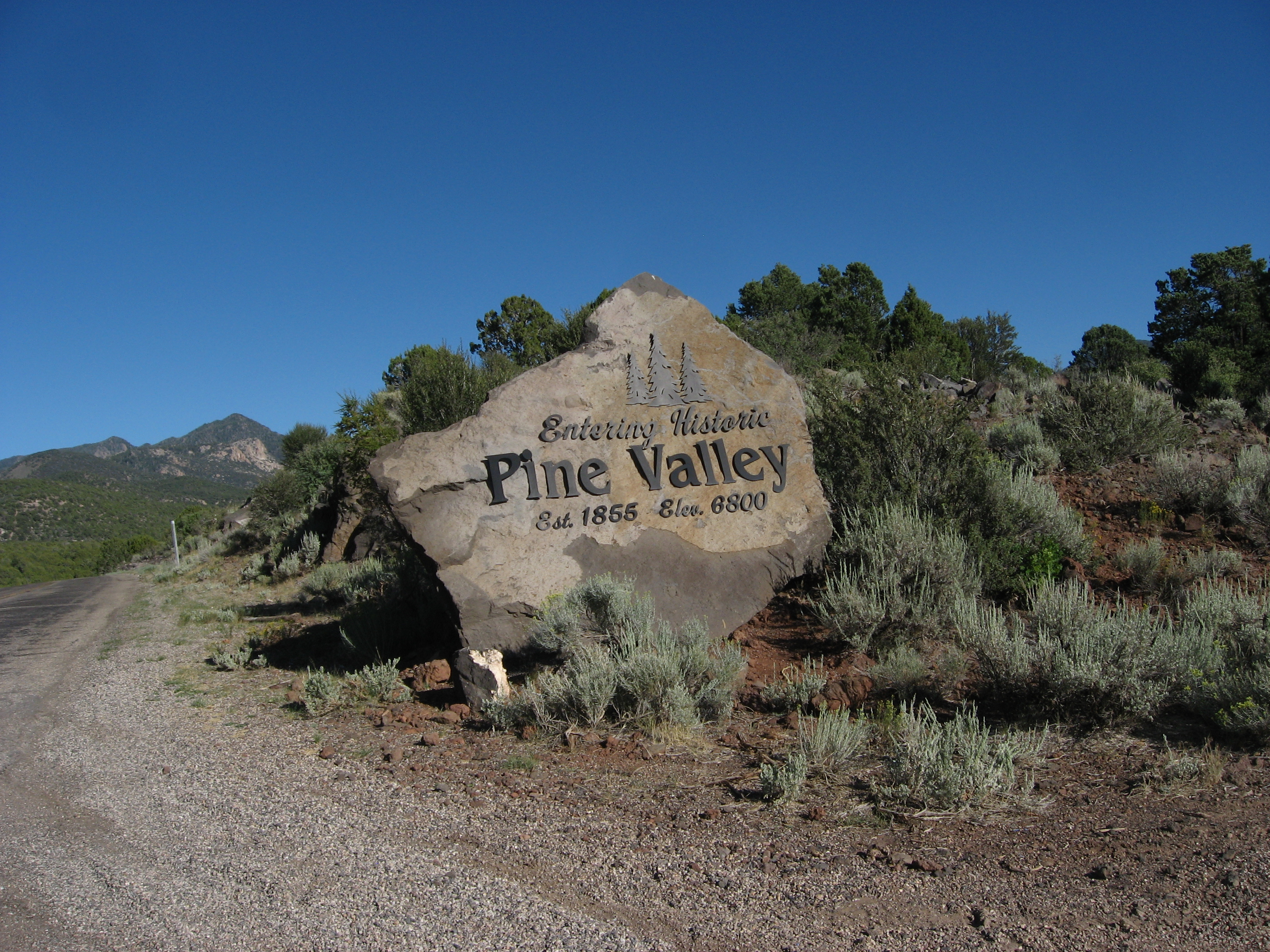
"Entering Historic Pine Valley", September 2010

Historical population
Census	Pop.	Note	%±
2010	186		—
2020	249		33.9%

As of the census of 2010, there were 186 people living in the CDP. There were 461 housing units. The racial makeup of the town was 97.8% White, 0.5% Black or African American, 1.1% American Indian and Alaska Native, and 0.5% Asian. Hispanic or Latino of any race were 4.8% of the population.

== People ==
- William W. Cluff

== See also ==
- List of census-designated places in Utah
