= Denise Brice =

French paleontologist (1928–2025)

- Born: 4 July 1928; Ennevelin, France
- Died: 7 February 2025 (aged 96); Villeneuve-d'Ascq, France
- Education: Université catholique de Lille
- Occupation: Paleontologist

Denise Brice (4 July 1928 – 7 February 2025) was a French paleontologist.

== Life and career ==
Born in Ennevelin on 4 July 1928, Brice completed her doctoral thesis under the supervision of Dorothée Le Maître. She began her professional career at the Université catholique de Lille, where she was a professor. She also conducted research at the French National Centre for Scientific Research. In 1971 and from 1995 to 1996, she was president of the Société géologique du Nord, of which she was also honorary president from 2023 to 2025.

Brice specialized in the study of Devonian brachiopods, conducting field research in the Canadian Arctic and the Boulonnais. She edited a monography covering Devonian life in the Boulonnais region. She described new brachiopod genera: Dichospirifer, Enchondrospirifer, Eobrachythyris, Eodmitria, and Ellesmererhynchia. A number of species were named after her, including Dendropora briceae and Stenorhynchia briceae.

Brice died in Villeneuve-d'Ascq on 7 February 2025, at the age of 96.

== Publications ==
- Étude paléontologique et stratigraphique du Dévonien de l’Afghanistan (1971)
- Brachiopodes du Dévonien inférieur et moyen des Formations de Blue Fiord et Bird Fiord des îles arctiques canadiennes (1982)
- Le Dévonien de Ferques, Bas-Boulonnais (1988)
- Stratotype Givétien (2016)
