= James Bryce (geologist) =

Irish mathematician, naturalist and geologist

James Bryce FRSE FGS
- Born: 22 October 1806; Killaig, near Coleraine, County Londonderry, Ulster
- Died: 11 July 1877 (aged 70); Inverfarigaig, Inverness-shire, Scotland
- Cause of death: killed by a fall of rocks while geologizing
- Resting place: Grange Cemetery, Edinburgh
- Education: University of Glasgow
- Occupations: schoolteacher; geologist; educator
- Spouse: Margaret Young (m. 1836)
- Children: James Bryce; (John) Annan Bryce
- Parents: Reverend James Bryce (father); Catherine née Annan (mother)
- Relatives: Rev. Dr. Reuben John Bryce (brother); Thomas Hastie Bryce (nephew); Marjery Bryce (granddaughter)
- Honors: LLD (University of Glasgow)
- Scientific career
- Fields: geology, education
- Workplaces: High School of Glasgow

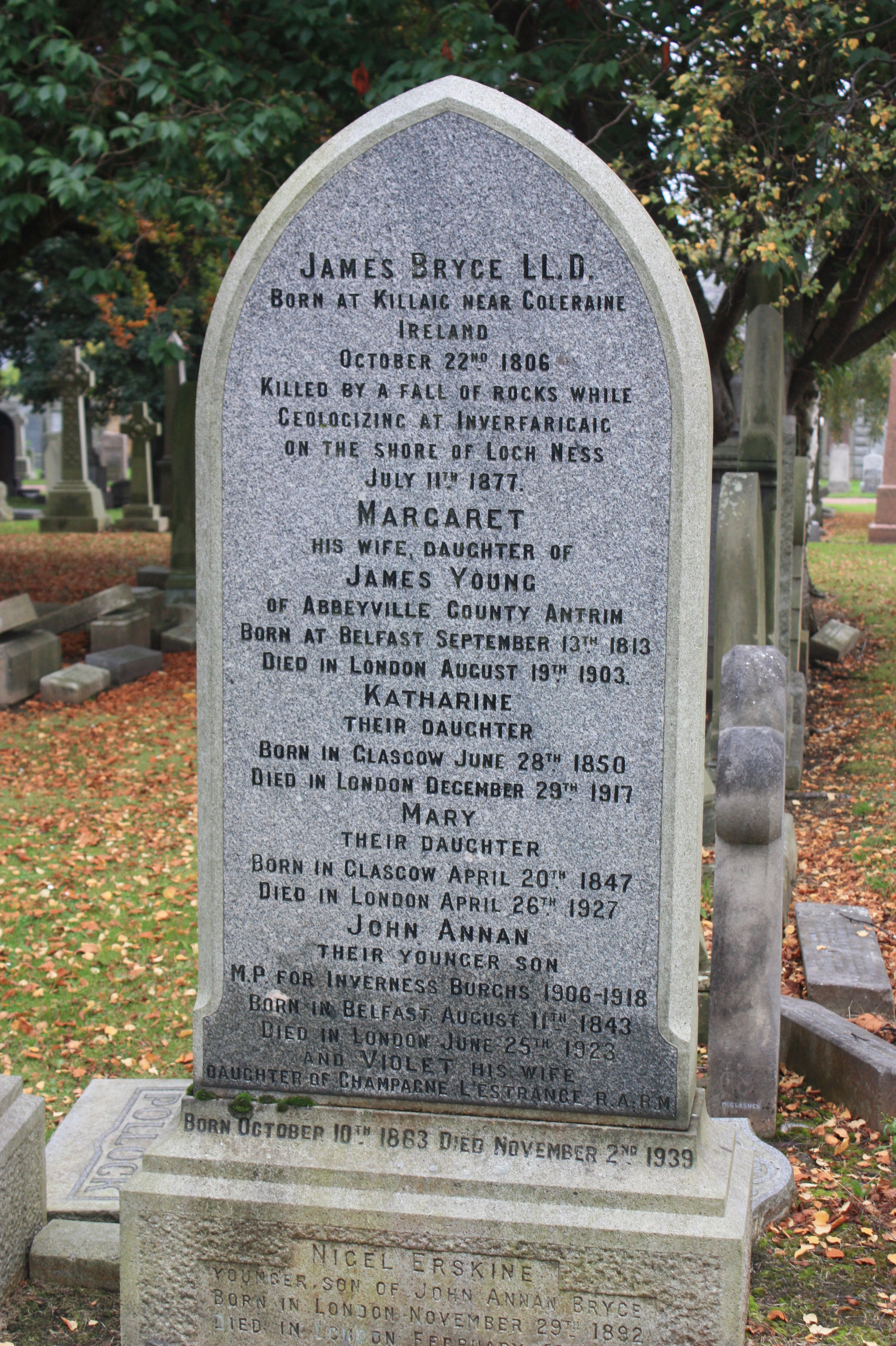
The grave of James Bryce, geologist, Grange Cemetery, Edinburgh

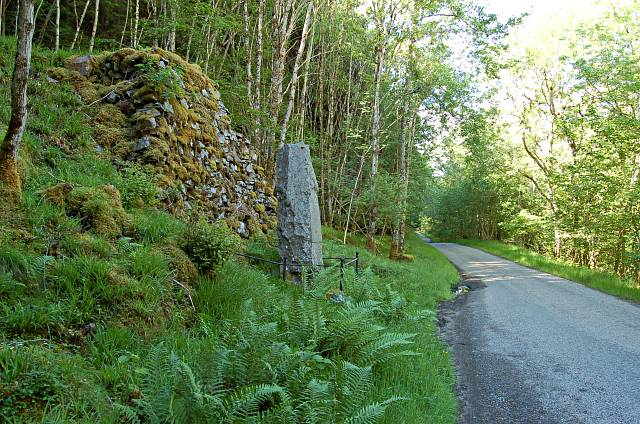
Memorial near Inverfarigaig

James Bryce LLD FRSE FGS (22 October 1806, in Killaig, near Coleraine, County Londonderry, Ulster – 11 July 1877, in Inverfarigaig, Inverness-shire, Scotland) was an Irish mathematician, naturalist and geologist.

== Early life ==
He was the third son of the Reverend James Bryce (b. 1767, Airdrie in Lanarkshire, Scotland – d. 1857 at the age of ninety; son of John Bryce, a Scottish tradesman who descended from small landowners settled at Dechmont in Linlithgowshire, Scotland, and wife Robina née Allen, whose family possessed considerable property near Airdrie, until ostracized and impoverished by adherence to covenanting principles) and his wife Catherine née Annan, of Auchtermuchty in Fife, Scotland. He was born at Killaig, near Coleraine, Ireland, and his parents were members of the Anti-Burgher faction of the Presbyterian Church in Ireland and assimilated into the Ulster Scots people. He was educated first by his father and eldest brother, Rev. Dr. Reuben John Bryce (1797–1888), and afterwards at the University of Glasgow, where he graduated M.A. in 1828, having distinguished himself in classical studies.

== Professional life ==
In 1826, Bryce was appointed Master of the Mathematical and Commercial Department of Belfast Academical Institution. He was Secretary of the Belfast Natural History Society from its foundation.

He had intended to study for the bar, but, finding this beyond his means, adopted the profession of teaching, and became mathematical master in the Belfast Academy, a foundation school of considerably more prestige in Ulster. In 1846 he was appointed to the High School of Glasgow, the ancient public grammar school of that city, and held this office till his resignation in 1874. He was a brilliant and successful teacher both of mathematics and geography, but his special interest lay in the study of natural history.

He devoted himself to geological researches, first in the north of Ireland, and afterwards in Scotland and northern England. He began in 1834 to write and publish articles on the fossils of the lias, greensand, and chalk beds in Antrim (the first appeared in the 'Philosophical Magazine' for that year), and these having attracted the notice of Sir Roderick Murchison and Sir Charles Lyell. He was a Fellow of the Geological Society of London and a Fellow of the Geological Society of Dublin.

His more important papers (among which may be found the first complete investigation and description of the structure of the Giant's Causeway) appeared in the 'Transactions' of the London society, others in the 'Proceedings' of the Natural History Society of Belfast and of the Philosophical Society of Glasgow, of which he was president (1868-1871). He also wrote 'A Treatise on Algebra,' which went through several editions, an introduction to 'Mathematical Astronomy and Geography', 'A Cyclopœdia of Geography' and a book on 'Arran and the other Clyde islands,' with special reference to their geology and antiquities. He also made an important contribution on the Jurassic rocks of Skye and Raasay which he studied between 1869-1872, with Ralph Tate joining him in the field in 1872.

He was a warm advocate of the more general introduction into schools of the teaching of natural history as well as natural science, and set the example of giving teaching voluntarily in these subjects, for which there was in his day no regular provision in the high schools of Scotland.

In 1858, he received from his university, in the reform of which he had borne a leading part, the honorary degree of LL.D. After resigning his post at Glasgow, he settled in Edinburgh, and published his later contributions to geology in the 'Transactions of the Royal Society of Edinburgh.' He was a keen and accurate observer, and having an ardent love of nature and great physical activity, continued his field work in the highlands of Scotland with unflagging zeal to the end of his life.

While examining a remarkable mass of granite at Inverfarigaig, on the shores of Loch Ness, he disturbed some loose stones by the strokes of his hammer, and caused the blocks above to fall on him, killing him instantaneously, 11 July 1877.

== Personal life ==
Bryce married Margaret (1813–1903), daughter of James Young, of Abbeyville, County Antrim, Ulster, in 1836. Their eldest son was James Bryce, later 1st Viscount Bryce (1838–1922), historian, lawyer, politician and diplomat; a younger son, (John) Annan Bryce (1843–1923), became an East India merchant and served as MP to Inverness. He was the uncle of Thomas Hastie Bryce (who also wrote on Arran).

Bryce is buried in the south-west section of the Grange Cemetery in Edinburgh. The grave is at the west end of a central east–west avenue in that section. His wife Margaret lies with him as does his son, John Annan Bryce.

== Works ==
- 1831 Tables of simple minerals, rocks, and shells : with local catalogues of species : for the use of the students of natural history in the Belfast Academy. Belfast, Simms and M'Intyre
- 1834 An account of the celebrated Portrush rock. Journal of the Geological Society of Dublin 2: 166–174
- 1837 A treatise on the elements of algebra Edinburgh, Adam and Charles Black
- 1837 On the geological structure of the north-eastern part of the county of Antrim. Transactions of the Geological Society of London 5: 69–81
- 1848 First principles of geography and astronomy : with the use of globes, Griffin
- 1852 Geological notices of the environs of Belfast, the east coast of Antrim, and the Giant's Causeway Dublin, James McGlashan
- 1870? The International Atlas and Geography: Modern, Historical, Classical and Physical. London: Collins & Sons – via HathiTrust.
- The geology of Arran and the other Clyde Islands with an Account of the Botany, Natural History, and Antiquities, Notices of the Scenery and an Itinerary of the Routes (4th ed.). Glasgow and London: William Collins, Sons, and Company. 1872 – via Internet Archive.
- 1873 "On the Jurassic Rocks of Skye and Raasay." with a palaeontological appendix by R. Tate". Quarterly Journal of the Geological Society. 29: 317–351. doi:10.1144/GSL.JGS.1873.029.01-02.20.
