= Pine Valley Chapel and Tithing Office =

- U.S. National Register of Historic Places
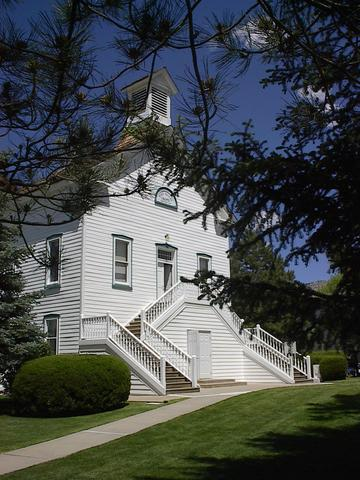

- Location within Utah Location within the United States
- Location: Main and Grass Valley Streets; Pine Valley, Utah; United States
- Coordinates: 37°23′30.6″N 113°30′52.4″W
- Area: 1/4 acre
- Built: 1867
- Architect: Ebenezer Bryce
- NRHP reference No.: 71000859
- Added to NRHP: November 30, 1970

The Pine Valley Chapel and Tithing Office, sometimes referred to collectively as the Pine Valley Ward Chapel, are historic 19th-century buildings of the Church of Jesus Christ of Latter-day Saints (LDS Church) located in Pine Valley, Washington County, Utah, they are jointly listed on the National Register of Historic Places.

== Description ==
Built in 1868, the Pine Valley Chapel is the oldest meetinghouse in continuous use of the LDS Church. Both the chapel and adjacent tithing office were listed together on the U.S. National Register of Historic Places November 20, 1970.

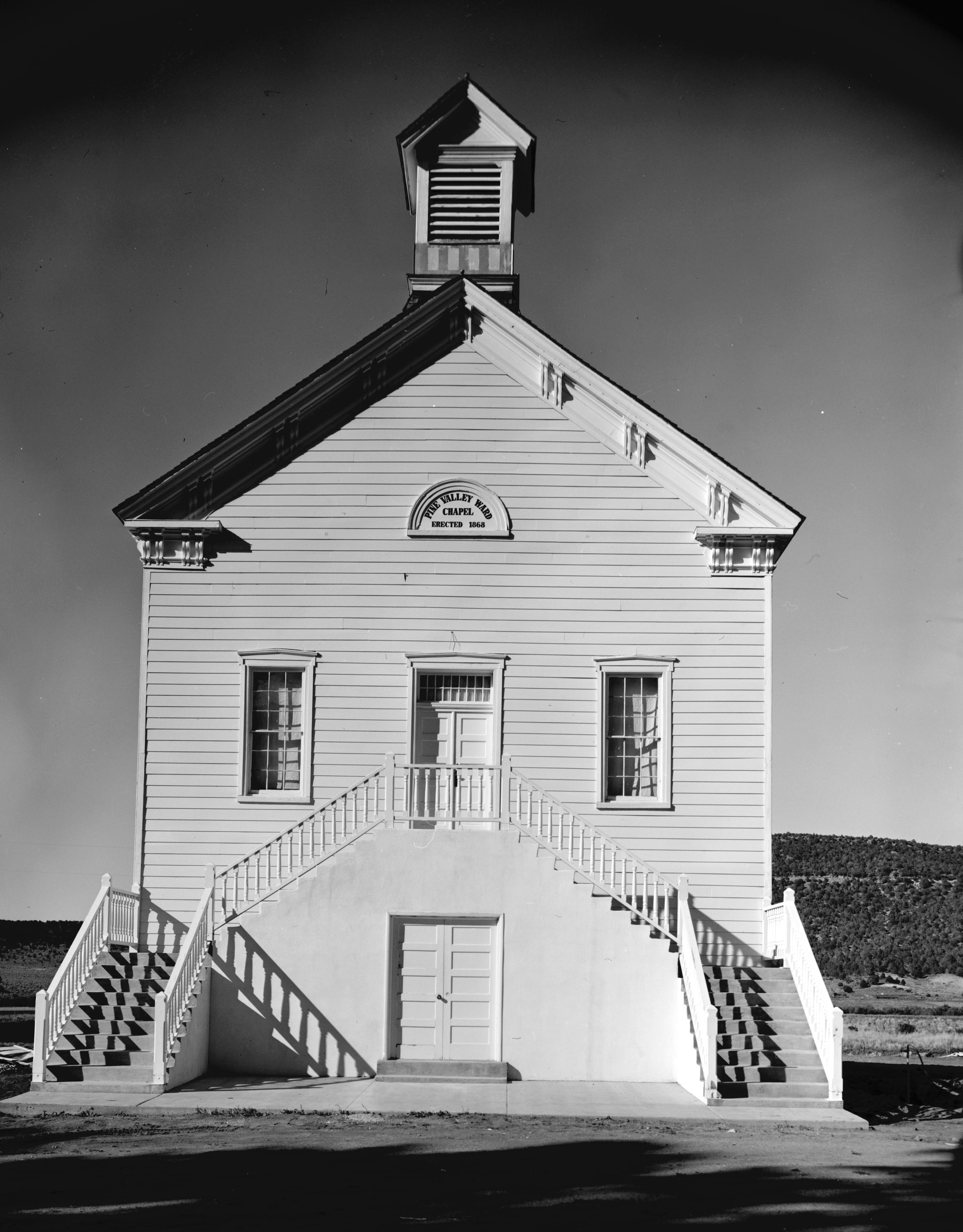
The Pine Valley Chapel in 1968

=== Chapel architecture ===
The Pine Valley Chapel was designed by a Scottish shipbuilder and LDS convert, Ebenezer Bryce. The construction of the chapel utilized techniques adopted from shipbuilding, and is comparable to an upside-down ship. The building consists of two levels built on a basement. The architectural style is reminiscent of New England churches, which was done in honor of LDS church leader Erastus Snow. The church was built from nearby Ponderosa pines, the same area where pines were shipped to Salt Lake City for the famous Salt Lake Tabernacle. A scaled-down replica of the Chapel was built at This Is the Place Heritage Park.

=== Tithing Office ===
Located east of the chapel, the well-preserved red-brick Tithing Office was built in the 1880s. Tithing to the church in 19th century Utah was often paid in-kind with farmed goods that were then redistributed to those in need. Thus, the tithing house served as a warehouse to accommodate tithes. The building has also, at different times, served as a family residence, the Pine Valley Post Office, and a meeting room for the Pine Valley Chapel.

== See also ==
- National Register of Historic Places listings in Washington County, Utah
