= Bryce Williams =

Bryce Williams may refer to:

- Bryce Williams (American football) (born 1993), American football tight end
- Bryce Williams (rugby union) (born 1980), New Zealand rugby player
- Bryce Williams, Tsawwassen First Nation Chief and Director on the Metro Vancouver Board
- Bryce Williams, pseudonym of Vester Lee Flanagan (1973–2015), perpetrator of the murders of Alison Parker and Adam Ward

== See also ==
- Brice Williams (born 2001), American basketball player
- William Bryce (1888–1963), Canadian politician
- Williams (disambiguation)
- Bryce (disambiguation)
