= Bryce =

Bryce may refer to:

== People ==
- Bryce (given name)
- Bryce (surname)

== Places ==
- Bryce Canyon National Park
- Mount Bryce
- Bryce, Utah
- Bryce, Arizona

== Other ==
- Bryce (software)
- Bryce Hospital

== See also ==
- Brice (disambiguation)
