= Marjery Bryce =

British suffragette and actress

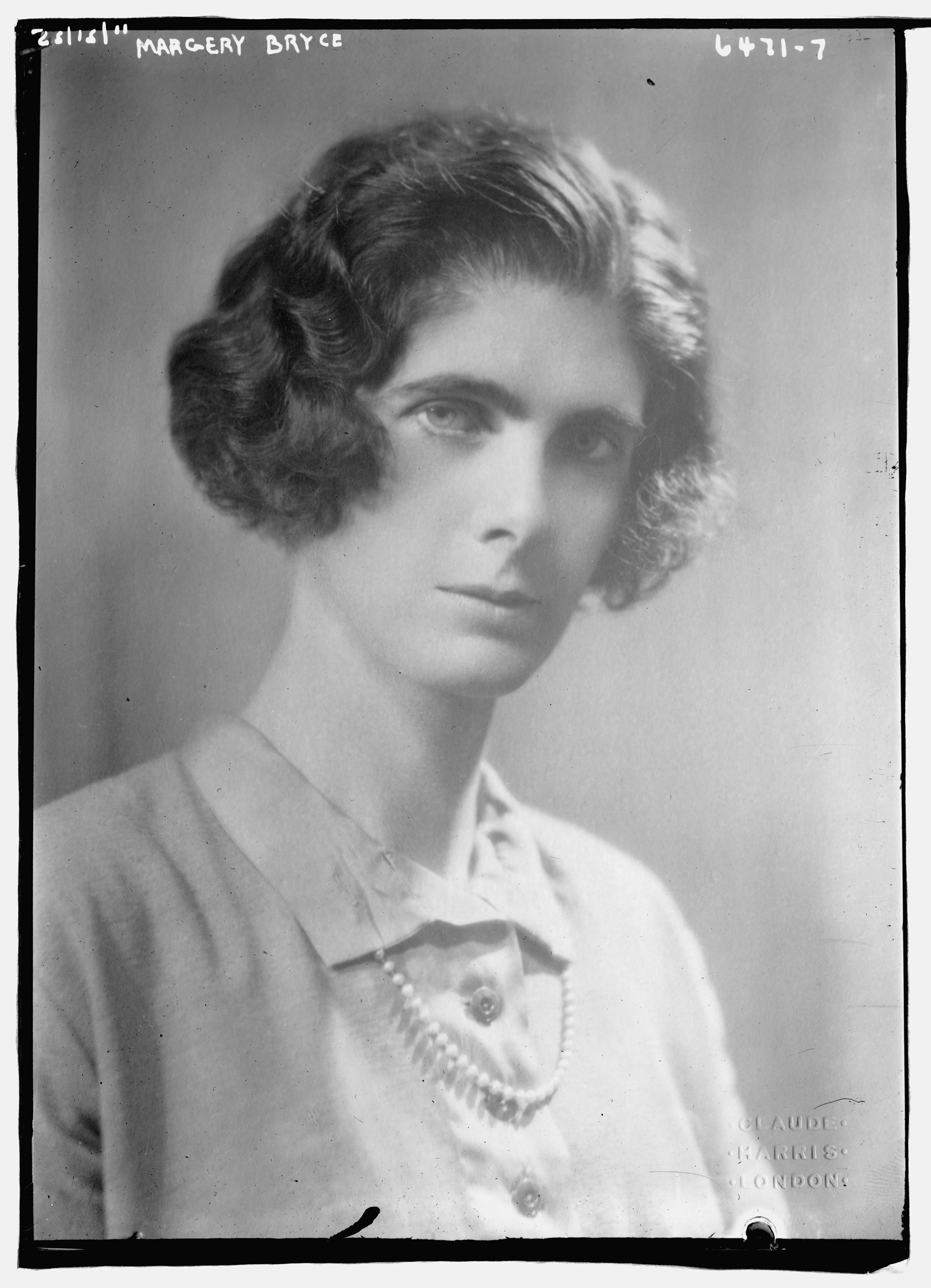
- Born: Margaret Vincentia Bryce; 18 June 1891; Marylebone, London Hammersmith
- Died: 8 June 1973 (aged 81); Hammersmith, London
- Occupation: Actress
- Known for: riding as Joan of Arc in suffragette parades
- Father: John Annan Bryce, Liberal MP
- Relatives: James Bryce (geologist) (grandfather); James Bryce, 1st Viscount Bryce (uncle)

Margaret Vincentia "Marjery" Bryce (18 June 1891 – 8 June 1973), usually credited as Marjorie Bryce, was a British suffragette and actress, who rode dressed as Joan of Arc in WSPU parades in support of votes for women.

== Family ==
Bryce was born at 35 Bryanston Square, Marylebone, to Irish-born parents John Annan Bryce, a politician of Ulster-Scots descent, and Violet L'Estrange, of Anglo-Irish descent.

She had two brothers and a sister three years younger, Rosalind, known as 'Tiny'. One brother, Nigel Erskine, died at the age of seventeen. Her other brother Roland, was later to be one of the commissioners in 1922 to lay out the borders for Yugoslavia.

Her father was Liberal MP for the Inverness Burghs, voted against the Conciliation Bill which was to give some women the franchise and wrote letters to the press against women's suffrage. Her mother, Violet held the opposite view and was a cousin to Countess Markievicz and Eva Gore-Booth, both activists for women's rights.

Bryce remained single.

== Role in Women's Suffrage movement ==
Bryce joined the Women's Social and Political Union (WSPU) parade at the age of nineteen was portraying 'the perfect woman' riding on a white horse dressed in full armour with a banner in the style of Joan of Arc, leading the forty thousand strong Women's Procession on 17 June 1911, before George V's Coronation. Her sister Rosalind "Tiny" Bryce was dressed as a page and led the horse's bridle. This demonstration was to encourage support of the proposed Conciliation Bill, which would have given the franchise to women who owned property.

The image of Saint Joan was seen to represent 'the militant women's ideal....in every act of hers they recognize the same spirit as that which strengthens them to risk their liberty and endure torture for the sake of freedom'. And the leaders of WSPU, Emmeline and Christabel Pankhurst, Emmeline Pethick-Lawrence and Mabel Tuke led the parade, with groups of women's trades and professions, or, like Bryce, dressed as famous women from the past. Christabel in particular felt the image of Joan of Arc included the willingness to undertake physical hardship and emphasised the martial (masculine) qualities as an image of fighting for a cause of right. This was summed up a ' the loveliness of simplicity, purity, courage and militancy' which Bryce was acting in this parade and was an image used by WSPU as a symbol.

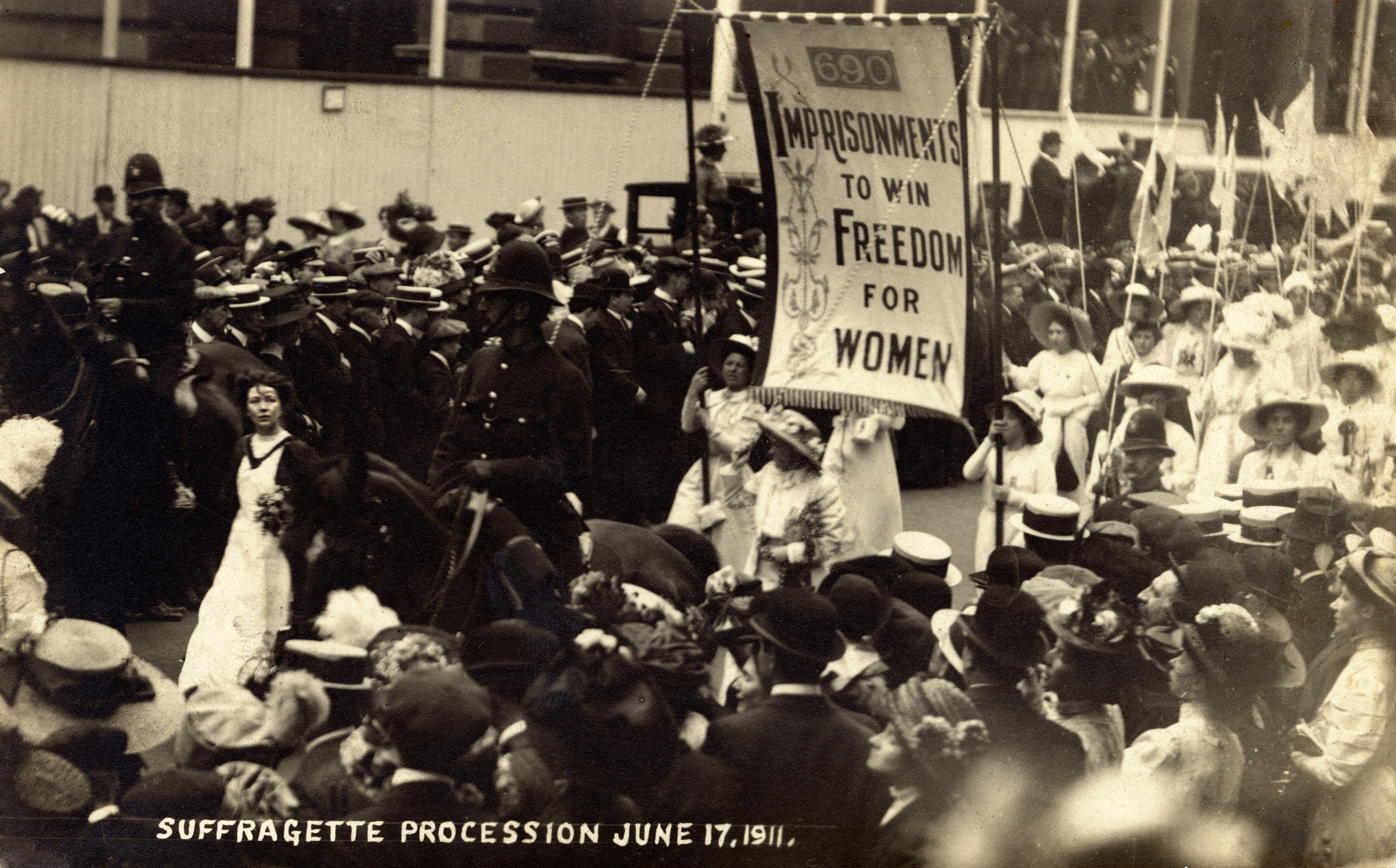
suffragette procession 1911

The Museum of London has the original copyright image of Bryce as Joan of Arc cited in many of the references above.

In other suffragette parades, Joan of Arc was also portrayed by Elsie Howey.

== Acting career ==
Bryce played the London stage for example, in the role of Nina Zarechnaya in The Seagull (1919), appeared in The Cloud that Lifted (1932) after performing in Other Gates in the Grafton Theatre, London in 1931, and was the Red Queen in Alice in Wonderland (in 1938 and again in 1947).

In 1927 she took the role of 'The Spirit of Henley' in the Henley Historical Pageant.

Her entry in 1939 The Spotlight theatrical casting directory describes her as a straight, comedy or character performer.

Bryce was later known for her roles in Agatha Christie's Ten Little Niggers (1949), appearing in BBC Sunday-Night Theatre (1950s) and appeared in a BBC series The Bell Family (1951).

== Death ==
Bryce died on 8 June 1973, at Charing Cross Hospital in Hammersmith, London.
