= Bryce Gibbs =

Bryce Gibbs may refer to:

- Bryce Gibbs (Australian rules footballer) (born 1989)
- Bryce Gibbs (rugby league) (born 1984), Australian rugby league footballer
