= Bryce W. Drennan =

Bryce W. Drennan (born 1963) is an American author who wrote the book Indigo E-Print 1000+ Graphic Designer’s Companion : The Essential Independent Guide to Digital Offset Printing. " In 1995, Drennan was a press operator and production manager working with an Indigo digital press. Upon publication in 1996, the book was the impetus for creation by the United States Library of Congress of a new cataloging classification, Z252.5.D54, which encompasses digital printing and digital printing presses.
