= Bryce Vissel =

Australian neuroscientist

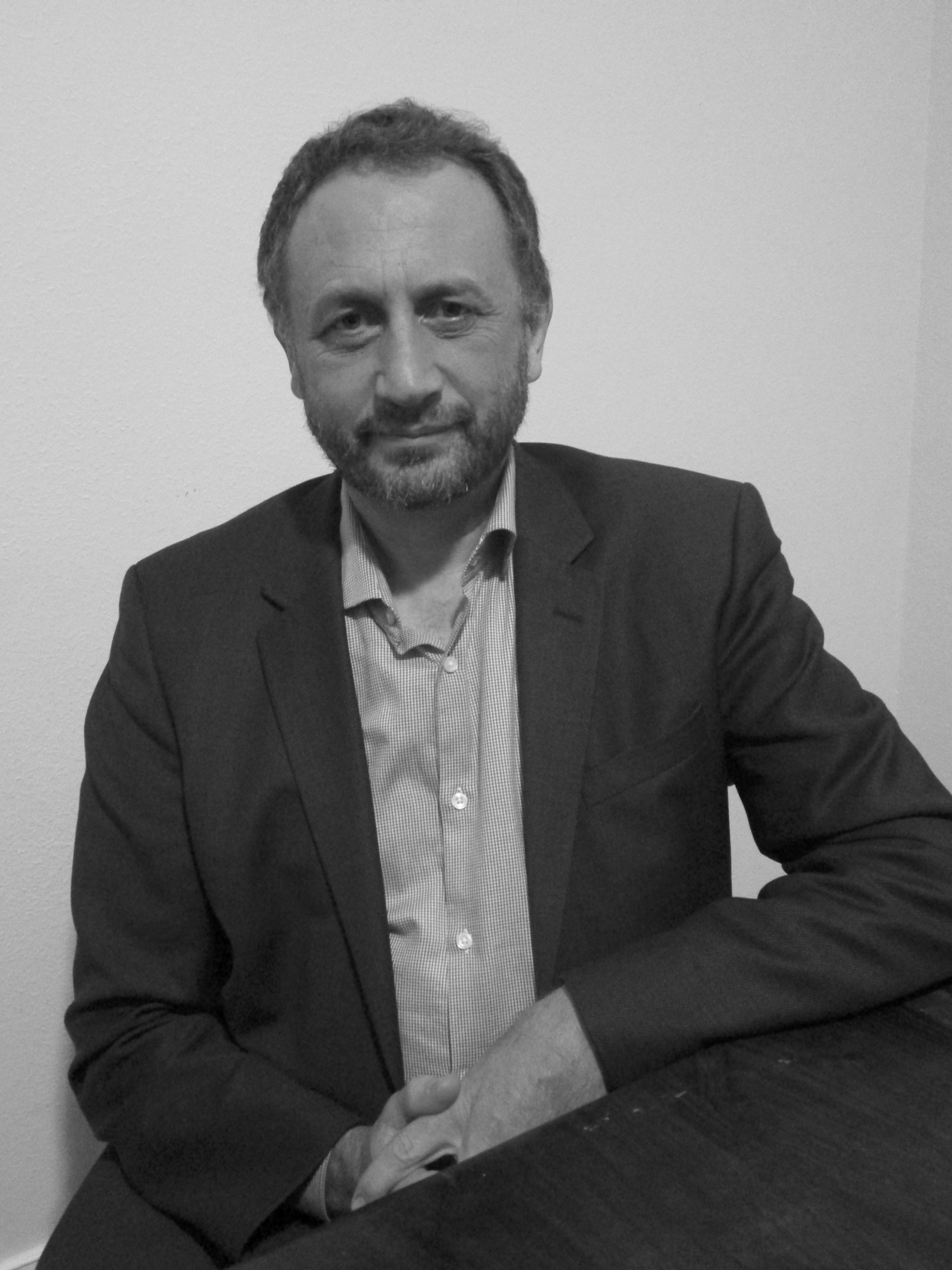

Bryce Vissel is an Australian neuroscientist who is a professor of neuroscience at the University of New South Wales. He is the Director of the Centre for Neuroscience and Regenerative Medicine (CNRM) at St Vincent's Hospital Sydney. He is a specialist in neurodegenerative diseases, such as Alzheimer's, Parkinson's, and the neural basis of learning, memory and movement.

== Career ==
After achieving his PhD in medical genetics at the University of Melbourne Vissel joined the Garvan Institute's Neuroscience Division. He was subsequently awarded a NHMRC CJ Martin Fellowship to pursue neuroscience research with Stephen Heinemann at the Salk Institute. At Salk, Vissel authored studies describing molecular mechanisms that regulate synaptic function, and the role of these mechanisms in behaviour, learning and memory, and neurological diseases. He also received a Human Frontiers Program Award and a Fulbright Award.

In 2002, Vissel returned to Garvan, taking up a position as Head of the Neurodegenerative Diseases Group before being recruited by UTS. Vissel and UTS established the CNRM in 2017. Incorporating facilities in Botany and St Vincent's Hospital, the Centre focused on research of the brain and spinal cord. In 2021, Vissel and CNRM moved to St Vincent's Hospital Sydney where the research effort continues.

Under Vissel's leadership, the CNRM's Brain Regeneration Program has shown that repair appears possible in the Ca1 and CA3 regions of the hippocampus, the brain's memory centre. These findings have potential to impact treatment of a range of diseases through stimulating the brain's regenerative mechanisms, including Parkinson's, Alzheimer's, and other devastating conditions.

Vissel was instrumental in introducing UCLA-based scientist Professor Reggie Edgerton's pioneering work on spinal cord injuries to Australia.

Vissel was also previously chair of the advisory board of Cellmid Ltd, a position he held since July 2015.
