= Ebenezer Bryce =

American Mormon pioneer and architect (1830–1913)

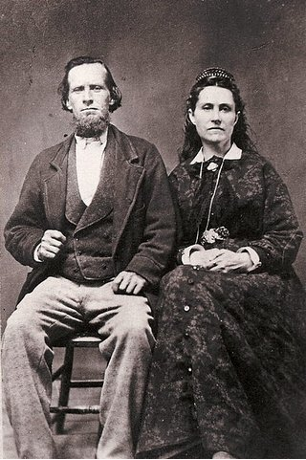
Ebenezer and Mary Bryce, ~1865

Bryce Canyon is named after Ebenezer Bryce who homesteaded nearby

Ebenezer Bryce (November 17, 1830 – September 26, 1913) was a Mormon pioneer, best known as the person for whom Bryce Canyon National Park was named.

== Early life ==
Bryce was born in the town of Dunblane in the then unitary council area of Perth and Kinross, which is today located in the Stirling council area of Scotland. He became a ship's carpenter, converted his faith to the Church of Jesus Christ of Latter-day Saints, and left Scotland for Utah at the age of seventeen. Ebenezer was the only member of his family to convert to the Church of Jesus Christ of Latter-day Saints, and was disowned by his father.

== Pine Valley ==
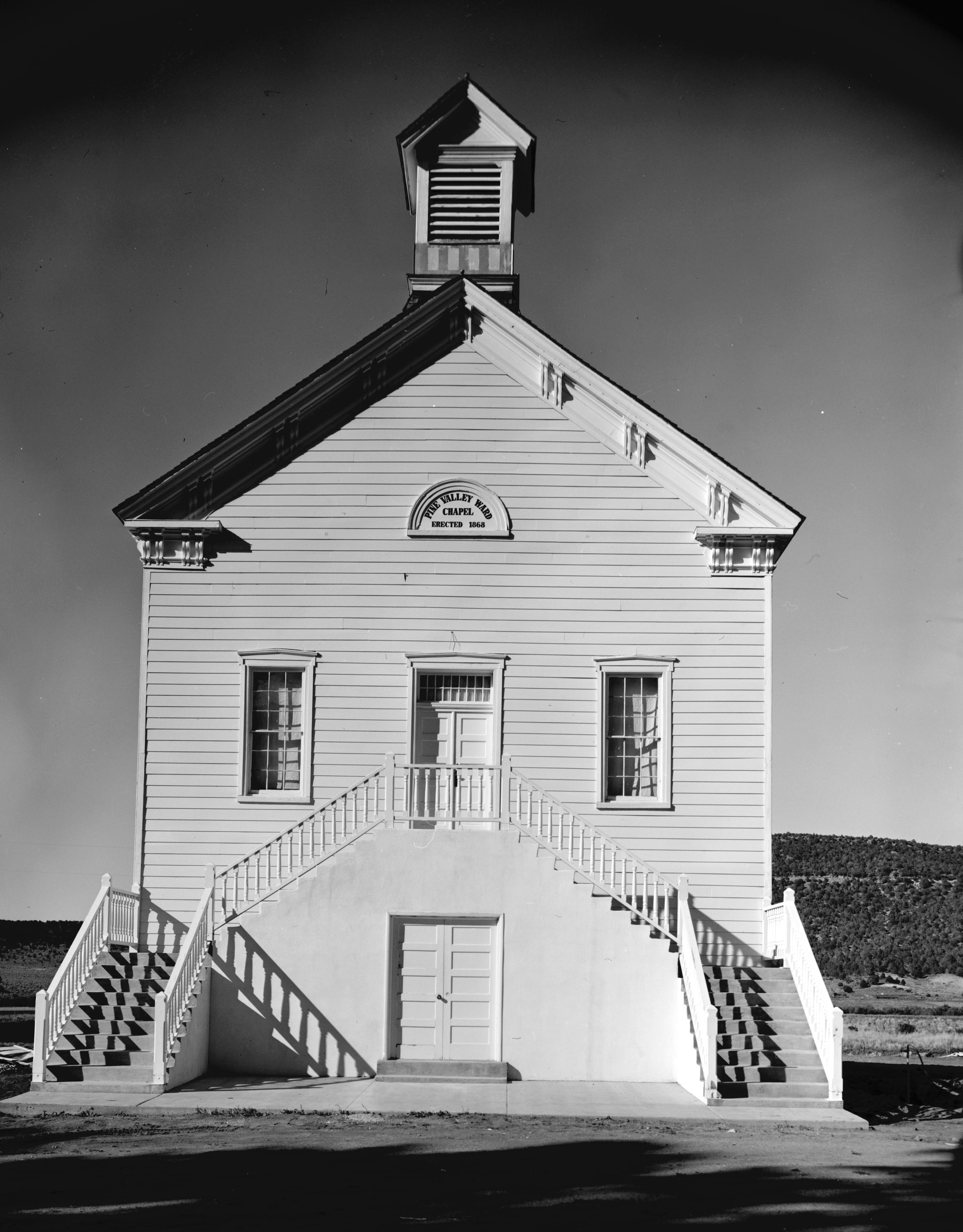
The Pine Valley Chapel in 1968, designed by Bryce 100 years earlier

Bryce married Mary Park in Salt Lake City in 1854. They moved to southern Utah by 1862, and settled in Pine Valley where Bryce was responsible for designing and overseeing the building of the Pine Valley Chapel in 1868, the oldest chapel still in continuous use by the Church of Jesus Christ of Latter-day Saints. The chapel is unique in that the roof was built like an upside down ship hull using a technique that Bryce acquired as a shipbuilder in Scotland. The walls of the chapel were assembled on the ground and hoisted up to the rhythm of a Scottish shipbuilding song sung by Ebenezer. The chapel is well maintained and is listed on the U.S. National Register of Historic Places. While in Pine Valley, Ebenezer also ran a sawmill for lumber for the construction of the St. George Temple.

== Bryce Canyon ==
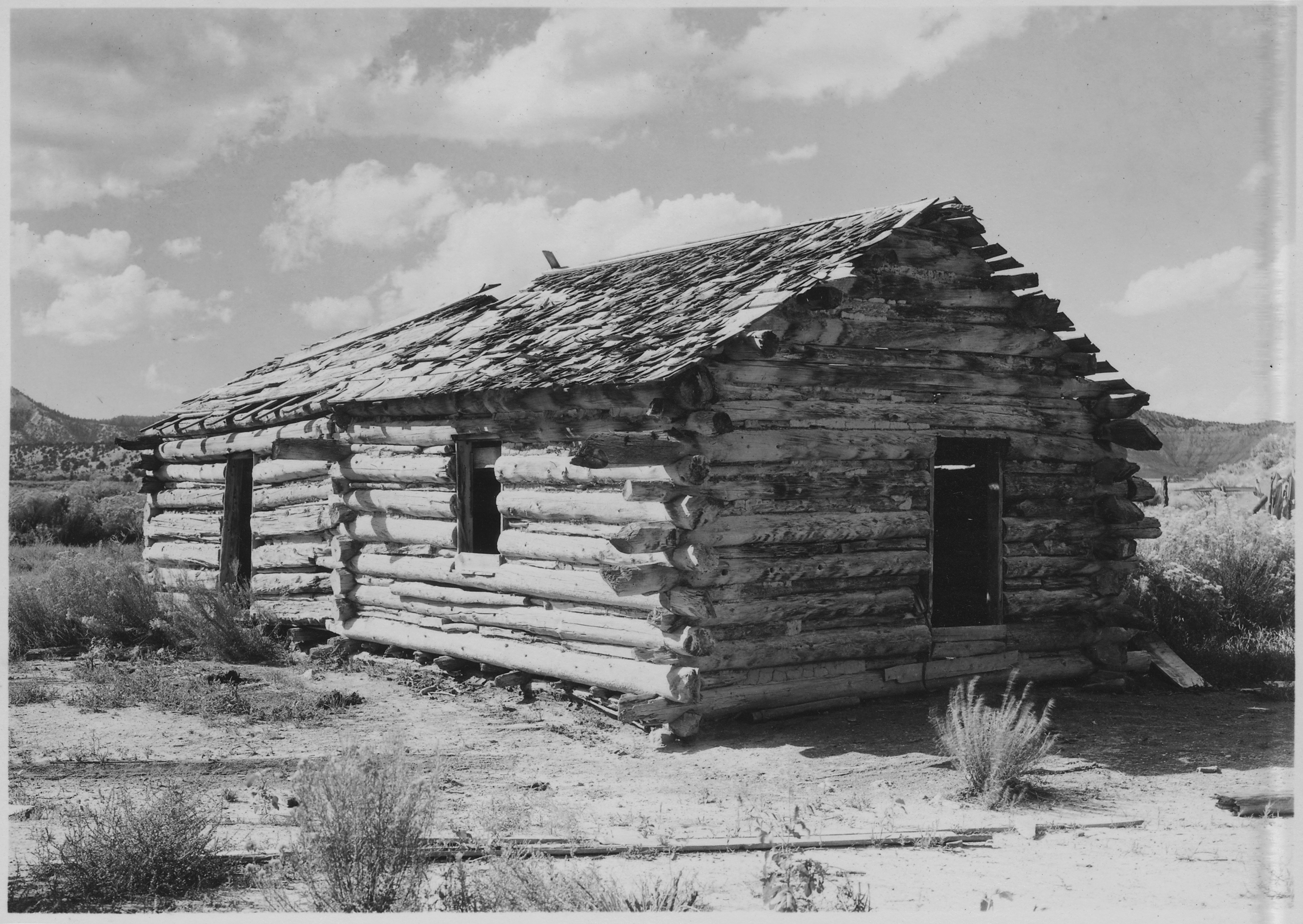
Early home of Ebenezer Bryce

Soon after, the family moved a short distance to the Paria Valley, south of Bryce Canyon, which became a National Monument in 1923 and a full-fledged National Park in 1928.

== Arizona ==
In 1880, Bryce moved his large family to an area of Arizona, about two miles north of Pima, where the settlement of Bryce, Arizona is named in his honor. It was there that he died and is buried in a local cemetery. Ebenezer built two homes in Arizona, both currently under restoration by the Ebenezer Bryce Foundation.
