= James Bryce, 1st Viscount Bryce =

British diplomat and politician (1838–1922)

The Right Honourable The Viscount Bryce OM GCVO PC FRS FBA
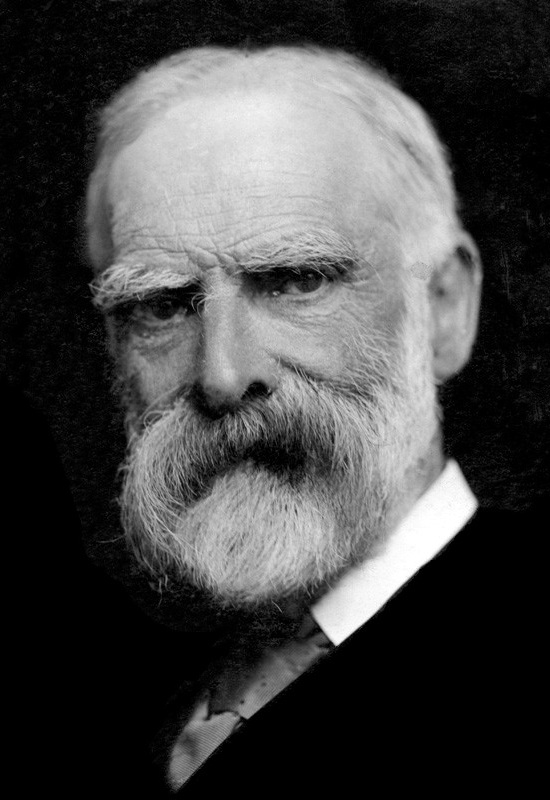
- Bryce in 1902

British Ambassador to the United States
- In office 1907–1913
- Monarchs: Edward VII; George V
- Prime Minister: Sir Henry Campbell-Bannerman (brother); H. H. Asquith
- Preceded by: Sir Henry Mortimer Durand
- Succeeded by: Sir Cecil Spring Rice

Chief Secretary for Ireland
- In office 10 December 1905 – 23 January 1907
- Monarch: Edward VII
- Prime Minister: Sir Henry Campbell-Bannerman
- Preceded by: Walter Long
- Succeeded by: Augustine Birrell

President of the Board of Trade
- In office 28 May 1894 – 21 June 1895
- Monarch: Victoria
- Prime Minister: The Earl of Rosebery
- Preceded by: A. J. Mundella
- Succeeded by: Charles Thomson Ritchie

Chancellor of the Duchy of Lancaster
- In office 18 August 1892 – 28 May 1894
- Monarch: Victoria
- Prime Minister: William Ewart Gladstone
- Preceded by: The Duke of Rutland
- Succeeded by: The Lord Tweedmouth

Under-Secretary of State for Foreign Affairs
- In office 7 February 1886 – 20 July 1886
- Monarch: Victoria
- Prime Minister: Gladstone
- Preceded by: Hon. Robert Bourke
- Succeeded by: Sir James Fergusson, Bt

Personal details
- Born: 10 May 1838 Belfast, Ireland
- Died: 22 January 1922 (aged 83) Sidmouth, Devon, England
- Resting place: Grange Cemetery, Edinburgh
- Party: Liberal
- Spouse: Lady Bryce (née Elizabeth Marion Ashton) (m. 1889)
- Parent(s): Margaret, daughter of James Young of Whiteabbey (mother); James Bryce, LLD (father)
- Relatives: (John) Annan Bryce (brother); Thomas Hastie Bryce (cousin); Marjery (Marjorie/Margaret) Bryce (niece)
- Education: University of Glasgow; Heidelberg University; Trinity College, Oxford
- Occupation: Politician
- Profession: Academic
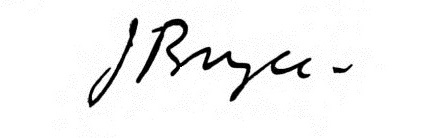
- Signature

James Bryce, 1st Viscount Bryce, OM, GCVO, PC, FRS, FBA (10 May 1838 – 22 January 1922), was a British academic, jurist, historian, diplomat, and Liberal politician. He was a widely traveled authority on law, government, and history whose expertise led to high political offices, culminating with his successful role as ambassador to the United States from 1907 to 1913. He entered the House of Commons in 1880, successively representing the constituencies of Tower Hamlets and South Aberdeen for the Liberal Party until 1907. His intellectual influence was greatest in The American Commonwealth (1888), an in-depth study of American politics that shaped public understanding of America in Britain and in the United States. In 1895, he chaired the Royal Commission on Secondary Education. Bryce was President of the Board of Trade, British envoy and ambassador to the United States; historian H.A.L. Fisher described him as "the most successful ambassador who has ever represented Great Britain at Washington".

== Background and education ==
Bryce was born in Arthur Street in Belfast, County Antrim, in Ulster, the son of Margaret, daughter of James Young of Whiteabbey, and James Bryce, LLD, from near Coleraine, County Londonderry. The first eight years of his life were spent residing at his grandfather's Whiteabbey residence, often playing for hours on the tranquil picturesque shoreline. Annan Bryce was his younger brother. He was educated at Glasgow High School, where his father taught, and for a year under his uncle Reuben John Bryce at the Belfast Academy. From there he proceeded to the University of Glasgow, and Trinity College, Oxford.

He was elected a fellow of Oriel College, Oxford, in 1862, without conforming to the Established Church, and may arguably be counted the first nonconformist college fellow at Oxford or Cambridge. He was called to the Bar, Lincoln's Inn, in 1867. His days studying at the University of Heidelberg under Vangerow gave him a long-life admiration of German historical and legal scholarship. He became a believer in "Teutonic freedom", an ill-defined concept that was held to bind Germany, Britain and the United States together. For him, the United States, the British Empire and Germany were "natural friends".

== Academic career ==
Bryce was admitted to the Bar and practised law in London for a few years but was soon called back to Oxford to become Regius Professor of Civil Law, a position he held from 1870 to 1893. From 1870 to 1875 he was also Professor of Jurisprudence at Owens College, Manchester. His reputation as a historian had been made as early as 1864 by his work on the Holy Roman Empire.

In 1872 Bryce travelled to Iceland to see the land of the Icelandic sagas, as he was a great admirer of Njáls saga. In 1876 he ventured through Russia and climbed Mount Ararat, one of the first climbers to do so, and was wrily amused to be thought the first man since Noah to stand atop the mountain. There is no truth in the notion that he believed that he had found a relic of the Ark.

In 1872 Bryce, a proponent of higher education, particularly for women, joined the Central Committee of the National Union for Improving the Education of Women of All Classes (NUIEWC).

== Member of Parliament ==
James Bryce c1895

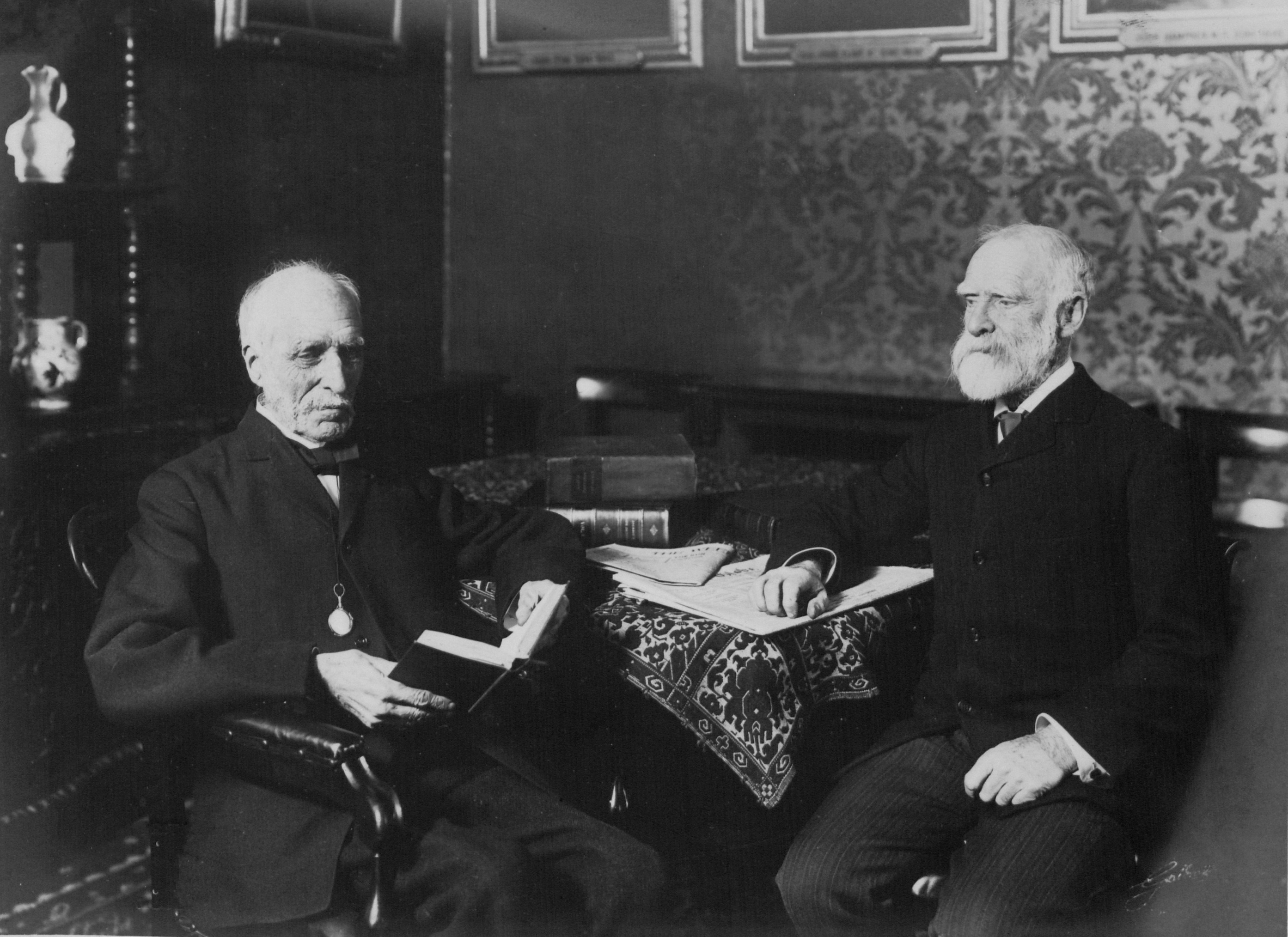
Bryce and Prof. Goldwin Smith, 1907

In 1880 Bryce, an ardent Liberal in politics, was elected to the House of Commons as member for the constituency of Tower Hamlets in London. In 1885 he was returned for South Aberdeen and he was re-elected there on succeeding occasions. He remained a Member of Parliament until 1907.

Bryce's intellectual distinction and political industry made him a valuable member of the Liberal Party. As early as the late 1860s he served as Chairman of the Royal Commission on Secondary Education. In 1885 he was made Under-Secretary of State for Foreign Affairs under William Ewart Gladstone but had to leave office after the Liberals were defeated in the general election later that year. In 1892 he joined Gladstone's last cabinet as Chancellor of the Duchy of Lancaster and was sworn of the Privy Council at the same time.

In 1894 Bryce was appointed President of the Board of Trade in the new cabinet of Lord Rosebery, but had to leave this office, along with the whole Liberal cabinet, the following year. The Liberals remained out of office for the next ten years.

In 1897, after a visit to South Africa, Bryce published a volume of Impressions of that country that had considerable influence in Liberal circles when the Second Boer War was being discussed. He devoted significant sections of the book to the recent history of South Africa, various social and economic details about the country, and his experiences while travelling with his party.

In 1900 he introduced a Private Member's Bill to secure access for the public to the mountains and moorlands in Scotland.

The "still radical" Bryce was made Chief Secretary for Ireland in Prime Minister Sir Henry Campbell-Bannerman's cabinet in 1905 and remained in office throughout 1906. Bryce was critical of three major social reforms proposed by this Liberal Government; old-age pensions, the Trade Disputes Act and the redistributive "People's Budget," which (according to one study) he regarded as making unwarranted concessions to socialism. Nevertheless, Bryce was regarded as a progressive figure, which one observer commenting) in reference to him being given a peerage in 1914) that

Of the whole membership of the Liberal party no man has more influence with the people of England than Lord Bryce. His support of any question pending will consequently be most valuable to the government and as he is a thorough radical, it is not likely that the government can produce anything particularly in the line of social reform that will not meet with his approval.

== The American Commonwealth (1888) ==
Bryce had become well known in America for his book The American Commonwealth (1888), a thorough examination of the institutions of the United States from the point of view of a historian and constitutional lawyer. Bryce painstakingly reproduced the travels of Alexis de Tocqueville, who wrote Democracy in America (1835–1840). Tocqueville had emphasised the egalitarianism of early-19th-century America, but Bryce was dismayed to find vast inequality: "Sixty years ago, there were no great fortunes in America, few large fortunes, no poverty. Now there is some poverty ... and a greater number of gigantic fortunes than in any other country of the world" and "As respects education ... the profusion of...elementary schools tends to raise the mass to a higher point than in Europe ... [but] there is an increasing class that has studied at the best universities. It appears that equality has diminished [in this regard] and will diminish further." The work was heavily used in academia, partly as a result of Bryce's close friendships with men such as James B. Angell, President of the University of Michigan and successively Charles W. Eliot and Abbott Lawrence Lowell at Harvard. The work also became a key text for American writers seeking to popularise a view of American history as distinctively Anglo-Saxon. The American Commonwealth contains Bryce's observation that "the enormous majority" of those American women he had spoken to opposed their own right to vote.

== Ambassador to the United States ==
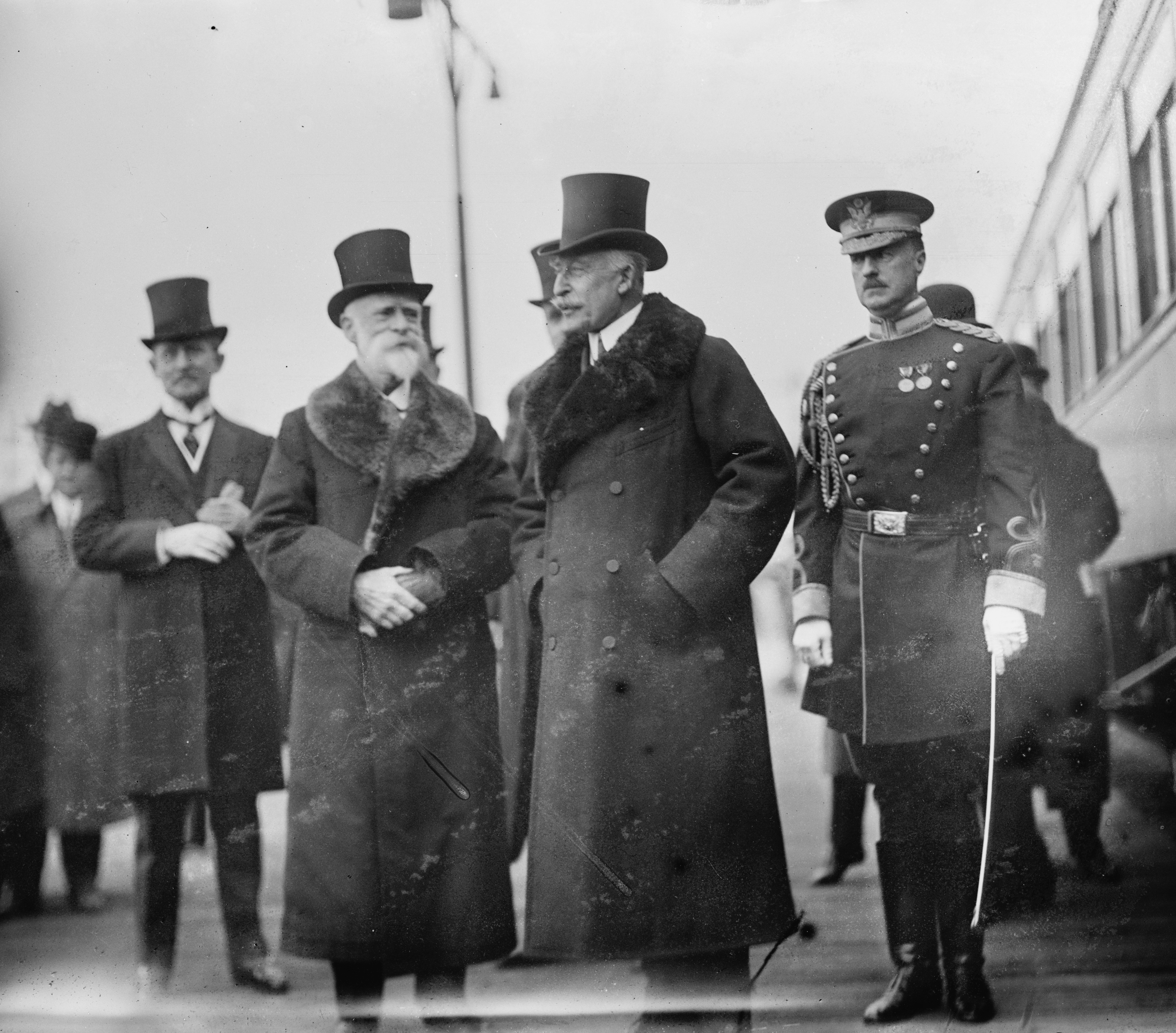
1911 - Bryce (far left) beside Prince Arthur, Duke of Connaught and Strathearn, Governor General of Canada (also wearing top hat)

In February 1907 Bryce was appointed Ambassador to the United States at the salary of $50,000 annually (about $1,700,000 in 2026 USD). He held this office until 1913, and was very efficient in strengthening Anglo-American ties and friendship. The appointment, criticised at the time as withdrawing from the regular diplomatic corps one of its most coveted posts, proved a great success. The United States had been in the habit of sending, as minister or ambassador to the Court of St James's, one of its leading citizens: a statesman, a man of letters, or a lawyer whose name and reputation were already well known in the United Kingdom. For the first time the United Kingdom responded in kind. Bryce, already favourably regarded in America as the author of The American Commonwealth, made himself thoroughly at home in the country; and, after the fashion of American ministers or ambassadors in England, he took up with eagerness and success the role of public orator on matters outside party politics, so far as his diplomatic duties permitted.

He made many personal friends among American politicians, such as President Theodore Roosevelt. The German ambassador in Washington, Graf Heinrich von Bernstorff, later stated how relieved he felt that Bryce was not his competitor for American sympathies during the First World War, even though Bernstorff helped to keep the United States from declaring war until 1917.

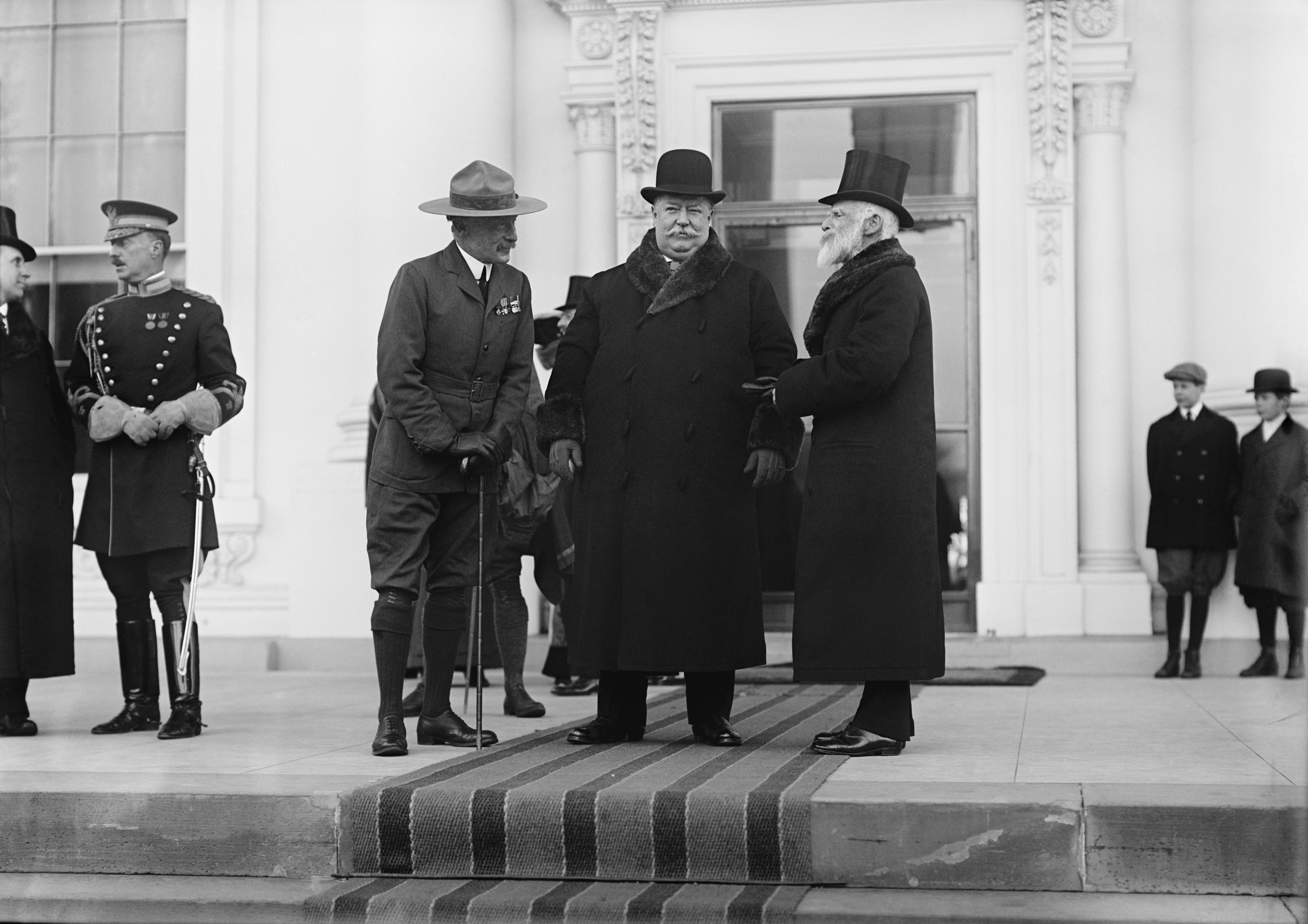
Robert Baden-Powell, William Howard Taft and James Bryce at the White House in 1912

Most of the questions with which he had to deal related to the relations between the United States and Canada, and in this connection he paid several visits to Canada to confer with the Governor General and his ministers. At the close of his embassy he told the Canadians that probably three-fourths of the business of the British embassy at Washington was Canadian, and of the eleven or twelve treaties he had signed nine had been treaties relating to the affairs of Canada. "By those nine treaties," he said, "we have, I hope, dealt with all the questions that are likely to arise between the United States and Canada questions relating to boundary; questions relating to the disposal and the use of boundary waters; questions relating to the fisheries in the international waters where the two countries adjoin one another; questions relating to the interests which we have in sealing in the Behring Sea, and many other matters." He could boast that he left the relations between the United States and Canada on an excellent footing.

== Peerage ==
In 1914, after his retirement as Ambassador and his return to Britain, Bryce was raised to the peerage as Viscount Bryce, of Dechmount in the County of Lanark. Thus he became a member of the House of Lords, the powers of which had been curtailed by the Parliament Act 1911.

== First World War ==
Along with other English scholars, who had ties of close association with German learning, he was reluctant in the last days of July 1914 to contemplate the possibility of war with Germany, but the violation of Belgian neutrality and the stories of outrages committed in Belgium by German troops brought him speedily into line with national feeling. Following the outbreak of the First World War Bryce was commissioned by Prime Minister H. H. Asquith to write what became known as The Bryce Report in which he described German atrocities in Belgium. The report was published in 1915 and was damning of German behaviour against civilians. Bryce's account was confirmed by Vernon Lyman Kellogg, the Director of the American Commission for Relief in Belgium, who told the New York Times that the German military had enslaved hundreds of thousands of Belgian workers, and abused and maimed many of them in the process.

Bryce strongly condemned the Armenian genocide in the Ottoman Empire mainly in 1915. Bryce was the first person to speak on the subject in the House of Lords, in July 1915. Later, with the assistance of the historian Arnold J. Toynbee, he produced a documentary record of the massacres that was published as a Blue Book by the British government in 1916. In 1921 Bryce wrote that the Armenian genocide had also claimed half of the population of the Assyrians in the Ottoman Empire and that similar cruelties had been perpetrated upon them.

== Beliefs ==
According to Morton Keller:

Bryce believed in Liberalism, the classic 19th century Liberalism of John Bright and William Gladstone, of free trade, free speech and press, personal liberty, and responsible leadership. This notably genial gregarious man had his hates, chief among them illiberal regimes: the Turkish oppressors of Bulgars and Armenians, and, later the Kaiser's Reich in World War I.

Bryce was also a leader in promoting international organizations, most notably the League of Nations.

Bryce had an interest in current democratic practices, as seen in his Modern Democracies (1921); a comparative study of the working of popular government in France, Switzerland, the United States, Canada, Australia and New Zealand.

Although a believer in social justice, Bryce was concerned about growing state power, as he noted in one study:

Our times have seen a growing desire to improve the conditions of the poorer classes, providing better houses and other health-giving conditions, fixing the hours of labour, raising wages, enacting compulsory methods for settling labour disputes. There is a wish to strike at the power of corporate wealth and monopolistic combinations by handing over large industries, or the means of transportation, or such sources of national wealth as coal and iron, to the State to be managed by it for the common benefit. There is also a passion for moral reform conspicuous in the effort to forbid the use of intoxicants. In these and other similar directions the power of the State seems to open the most direct way to the attainment of the aims desired. But every enlargement of the sphere of State action narrows the sphere left to the will of the individual, restricting in one way or another his natural freedom. So long as the people were ruled by a small class, they distrusted their rulers, and would have regarded administrative interference in many of the matters enumerated as a reduction of their liberty. But this jealousy of the State vanished when the masses obtained full control of the government. The administration is now their own: their impatience desires quick returns. "Why," they say, "should we fear government? Why not use it for our benefit? Why await the slow action of ameliorative forces when we can set the great machine to work at full speed?" These tendencies have during the last half-century gained the upper hand, and have discredited, without refuting, the laissez-faire doctrine which had held the field of economic thought since the days of Adam Smith. They seem likely to keep the ground they have won. Regulative legislation may reduce the freedom of workmen and of employers, may take great departments of industry out of private hands, may impose new obligations and proscribe old forms of pleasure.

Bryce did, however, write admiringly of social progress made in various nations he visited such as Australia, praising what he saw as the latter's high level of development:

The hand-workers, clerks, shop-assistants, persons of limited means, are all educated. Illiteracy is practically unknown. Nearly all are what would be deemed in Europe comfortably off, i.e. they are well fed, well housed, except (to a slight, and rapidly diminishing extent) in some few city slums. "Sweating" practices have been eliminated, and there is no pauperism. Nobody need want, unless he is hopelessly unthrifty or addicted to drink; and drunkenness, once a grave evil, has been greatly reduced of late years.

Similarly, in assessing the results of democratic governance of New Zealand, Bryce wrote positively of the level of development New Zealand had reached by the time of his study:

The total private wealth has been calculated at £387,000,000, and the average wealth per head, for persons over twenty years of age, estimated at £604, and this although there are no millionaires and very few persons rich according to British or American standards. A great number of the artisans own the houses they live in. No class is sunk to anywhere near the margin of subsistence, and the traveller, from the moment of landing, feels that the economic pressure of life is light.

In regards to mainland Europe, using France and Switzerland as examples, Bryce noted the benefits that democracy had brought to both countries. In regards to France, Bryce argued that

It is hard to estimate the value of the legislation which the Republic has produced without passing an opinion on measures which nothing but experience of their working can test. The subjects which have chiefly occupied the Chambers have been education, controversial only so far as it affects the action of ecclesiastics, the relations of Church and State, the right of working-men to combine in unions, old-age pensions, sanitation, factory laws, and taxation, the most hotly contested point in which has been not the tariff, for Protectionist doctrine reigns, but the imposition of an income-tax. Upon these subjects statutes of wide scope have been passed. There are complaints that more has not been effected for the benefit of the masses, but whoever considers the atmosphere of incessant party strife in which the Chambers have had to debate and decide will not disparage the amount and value of the work done to improve industrial condition.

Bryce drew similar conclusions in regards to Switzerland, arguing that

Social as well as civil equality exists and is accompanied by good feeling between the richer and the poorer. Nowhere is the sense of national unity stronger. There are no marked inequalities in wealth, and wealth, per se, is not an object of hatred. Its power is less felt in legislation than in any other modern country except Norway. There has been for seventy years little party passion and little religious bitterness. There are no professional politicians, and comparatively few local demagogues. Rings, Bosses, Caucuses are rarely discernible, and where visible, just sufficiently so to make their rarity noteworthy. Except in one political group, growing, but not yet large, contentment reigns. Contentment is not always a good sign, for it may be a mark of apathy, indicating that men hare not awakened to the possibility of bettering their conditions and developing their faculties. But no one can call the Swiss apathetic.

Bryce was a critic of female suffrage, which he blamed for an election defeat by the Liberals in 1918, as he argued in a letter dated the 21st of November 1919:

We guess but cannot prove, that Woman's Suffrage had much to do with the tremendous Liberal defeat. To the women, five-sixths of whom know nothing about politics, Lloyd George means something for they were told that he had won the war and was going to hang the German Emperor and Labour meant something, because there were to be higher wages and larger old-age pensions, etc. etc., but Liberalism meant nothing at all. Nobody has any confidence in the present government, least of all in its head, and it stands by the weakness of its opponents and the pledges given to it by the Coalition members. The election may not come for more than a year yet. It looks to me as if the best thing for a restoration of common sense and good-feeling between classes would be a collapse of Bolshevism in Russia. Its continuance keeps up wild ideas here, infecting a large part of our working class. The world has not yet recovered sanity.

== Honours and other public appointments ==
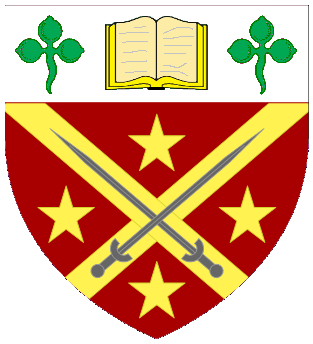
Arms as displayed at Lincoln's Inn

Bryce received numerous academic honours from home and foreign universities. In September 1901, he received the degree of Doctor of Laws from Dartmouth College, and in October 1902 he received an honorary degree (LLD) from the University of St Andrews, and in 1914 he received an honorary degree from Oxford. He became a fellow of the Royal Society in 1894.

In earlier life, he was a notable mountain climber, ascending Mount Ararat in 1876, and published a volume on Transcaucasia and Ararat in 1877; in 1899 to 1901, he was the president of the Alpine Club. From his Caucasian journey, he brought back a deep distrust of Ottoman rule in Asia Minor and a distinct sympathy for the Armenian people.

In 1882, Bryce established the National Liberal Club, whose members, in its first three decades, included fellow founder Prime Minister Gladstone, George Bernard Shaw, David Lloyd George, H. H. Asquith and many other prominent Liberal candidates and MP's such as Winston Churchill and Bertrand Russell. In April 1882 Bryce was elected a member of the American Antiquarian Society. He was elected an International Honorary Member of the American Academy of Arts and Sciences in 1893 and an International Member of the American Philosophical Society in 1895.

In 1907 he was made a Member of the Order of Merit by King Edward VII, At the King's death, Bryce arranged his Washington Memorial Service. At the time of Bryce's memorial service at Westminster Abbey, his wife, Elizabeth, received condolences from King George V, who "regarded Lord Bryce as an old friend and trusted counsellor to whom I could always turn." Queen Victoria had said that Bryce was "one of the best informed men on all subjects I have ever met". In 1918 he was appointed GCVO.

Bryce was president of the American Political Science Association from 1907 to 1908. He was the fourth person to hold this office. He was president of the British Academy from 1913 to 1917. In 1919 he delivered the British Academy's inaugural Raleigh Lecture on History, on "World History".

Bryce chaired the Conference on the Reform of the Second Chamber in 1917–1918.

== Personal life ==
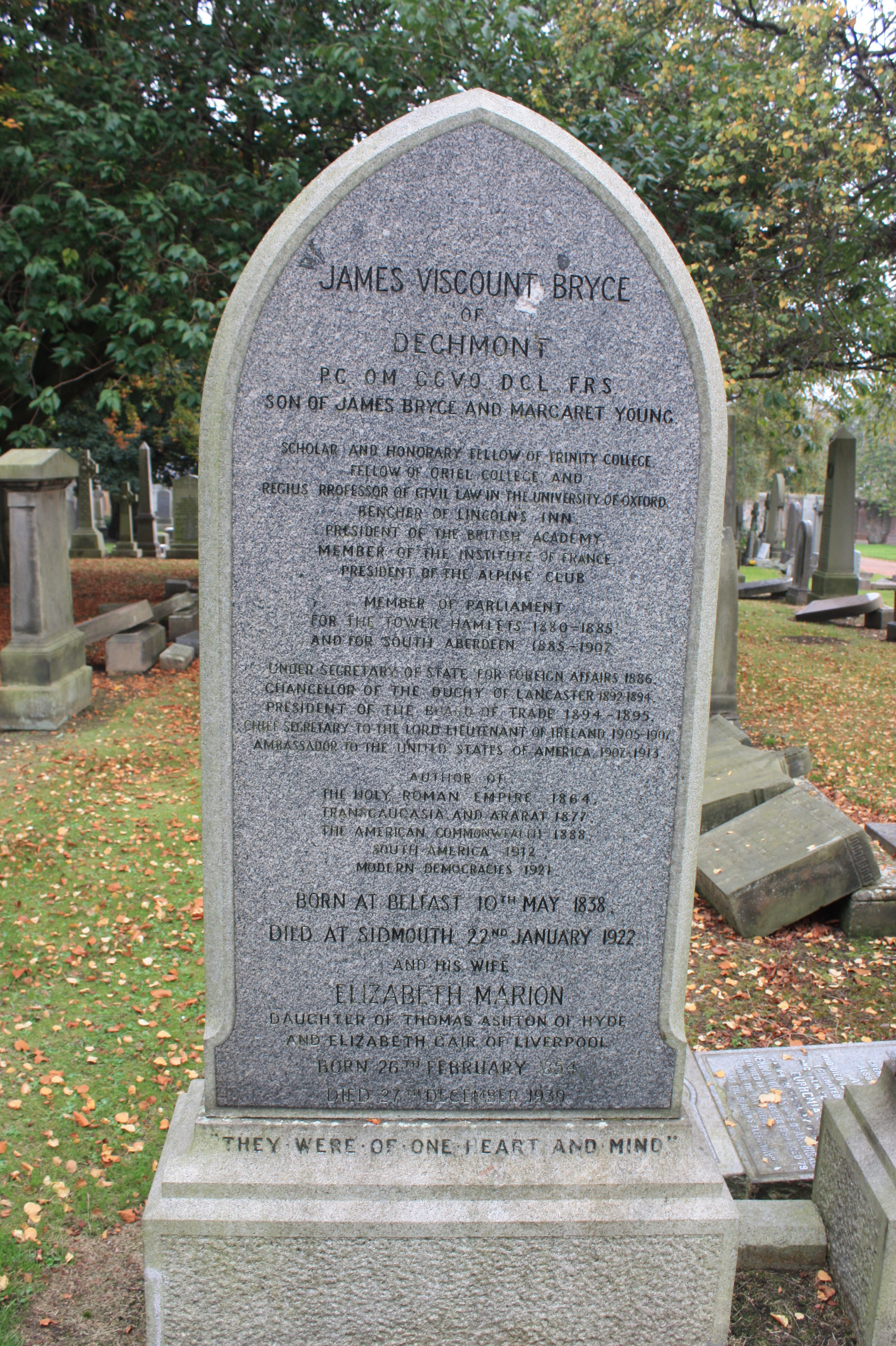
Memorial to Bryce, Grange Cemetery, Edinburgh

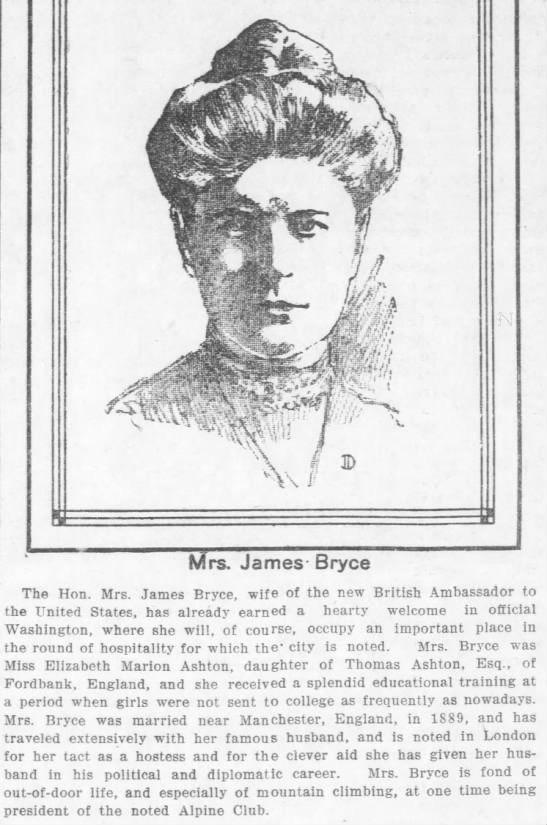
Lady Bryce (née Elizabeth Ashton) - wife of James, Viscount Bryce

Bryce married Elizabeth Marion, daughter of Thomas Ashton and sister of Thomas Ashton, 1st Baron Ashton of Hyde, in 1889. Lord and Lady Bryce had no children.

Bryce died while on holiday on 22 January 1922, aged 83, of heart failure in his sleep at The Victoria Hotel, Sidmouth, Devon, on the last of his lifelong travels. The viscountcy died with him. He was cremated at Golders Green Crematorium, following which his ashes were buried near to his parents at Grange Cemetery, Edinburgh.

Executors of his will included his brother-in-law, Charles Lupton.

Lady Bryce is recalled in the memoirs of Captain Peter Middleton, grandfather of Catherine, Princess of Wales who wrote, "Nor will I forget my terror of Lady Bryce", who was the aunt of his mother's first cousins, sisters Elinor and Elizabeth Lupton.

Lady Bryce died in 1939. Her papers are held at the Bodleian Library.

== Memorials ==
There is a large monument to Viscount Bryce in the southwest section of the Grange Cemetery in Edinburgh, facing north at the west end of the central east–west avenue. His ashes are buried there.

There is a bust of Viscount Bryce in Trinity Church on Broadway, near Wall Street in New York. A similar bust is in the U.S. Capitol Building and there is a commemorative Bryce Park in Washington DC.

In 1965 the James Bryce Chair of Government was endowed at the University of Glasgow. "Government" was changed to "Politics" in 1970.

In 2013 the Ulster History Circle unveiled a blue plaque dedicated to him, near his birthplace in Belfast.

On the occasion of the 160th anniversary of Bryce's birth, a small street off of Baghramyan Avenue in Yerevan, Armenia was named "James Bryce Street" in 1998.

== Publications ==
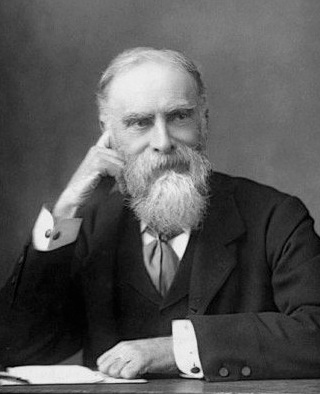
1st Viscount Bryce in 1893

- The Holy Roman Empire (1 ed.). Oxford, and London and Cambridge: T. & G. Shrimpton and Macmillan. 1864 – via Google Books. revised edition 1904, many reprints.
- Report on the Condition of Education in Lancashire, 1867
- The Academical Study of the Civil Law - An Inaugural Lecture Delivered at Oxford, February 25, 1871. London and New York: Macmillan. 1871. hdl:2027/mdp.39015062374643 – via HathiTrust. via Google Books
- The Trade Marks Registration Act, with Introduction and Notes on Trade Mark Law, 1877
- Transcaucasia and Ararat: Being Notes of a Vocation Tour in the Autumn of 1876. London: Macmillan and Co. 1877 – via Google Books.; 4th ed. 1896, via - Internet Archive
- The American Commonwealth. 1888 – via Internet Archive. Volume I, Volume II, Volume III
- William Ewart Gladstone: His Characteristics as Man and Statesman. New York: The Century Co. 1898 – via Internet Archive.
- Impressions of South Africa. London: Macmillan and Co., Limited. 1898 – via Internet Archive.
- Studies in History and Jurisprudence. Vol. I. New York: Oxford University Press. 1901 – via Internet Archive. Volume II
- Studies in Contemporary Biography. New York, London: Macmillan. 1903 – via Internet Archive.
- The Hindrances to Good Citizenship. New Haven and London: Yale University Press and Henry Frowde, Oxford University Press. 1909 – via Internet Archive. Reissued by Transaction Publishers, 1993, edited and with a new Introduction by Howard G. Schneiderman
- South America: Observations and Impressions. New York: Macmillan. 1912 – via Internet Archive.
- University and Historical Addresses: Delivered During a Residence in the United States as Ambassador of Great Britain. New York: Macmillan. 1913 – via Internet Archive.
- The Ancient Roman Empire and the British Empire in India The Diffusion of Roman and English Law throughout the World: TWO HISTORICAL STUDIES. Oxford University Press. 1914 – via Internet Archive.
- James Bryce; Frederick Pollock; Edward Clarke; Kenelm Edward Digby; Alfred Hopkinson; H. A. L. Fisher; Harold Cox (1915). Report of the Committee on Alleged German Outrages Appointed by His Britannic Majesty's Government and Presided over by The Right Hon. Viscount Bryce, O.M., &c. New York: Macmillan Company – via Internet Archive.
- Proposals for the Avoidance of War with a Prefatory Note (As revised up to 24th February, 1915). Private and Confidential (Not for Publication) – via Internet Archive.
- The Treatment of Armenians in the Ottoman Empire 1915–16. 1916 – via Internet Archive.
- Viscount Bryce et al. (1917). Proposals for the Prevention of Future Wars. London: George Allen and Unwin Ltd – via Internet Archive.
- Essays and Addresses in War Time. New York, Macmillan. 1918 – via Internet Archive.
- WORLD HISTORY THE ANNUAL RALEIGH LECTURE - read 29 October 1919. London: THE BRITISH ACADEMY. 1919.
- Modern Democracies. London and New York: The Macmillan Company. 1921 – via Internet Archive. Volume I, Volume II
- Memories of Travel. New York: Macmillan. 1923 – via Internet Archive.
- International Relations: Eight Lectures Delivered in the United States in August 1921. New York: The Macmillan Company. 1927 – via Internet Archive.; 1922 edition

His Studies in History and Jurisprudence (1901) and Studies in Contemporary Biography (1903) were republications of essays.

=== Selected articles ===
- "The Future of the English Universities". The Fortnightly Review. XXXIX: 382-403. 1883 – via Internet Archive.
- "An Ideal University". The Contemporary Review. XLV: 836-856. June 1884 – via Internet Archive.
- "The Relations of History and Geography". The Contemporary Review. XLIX: 426-443. January–June 1886 – via Internet Archive.
- "Life of Justinian by Theophilus". The English Historical Review. 2 (8): 657–686. October 1887. JSTOR 546912.
- Bryce, James (1907). "Introduction". In R. BARRY O’BRIEN (ed.). TWO CENTURIES OF IRISH HISTORY 1691-1870 (2nd ed.). London: KEGAN PAUL, TRENCH, TRUBNER & CO. pp. IX - XXXVII – via Internet Archive.; 1st edition, 1888
- "An Age of Discontent". The Contemporary Review. LIX: 14-29. January 1891 – via Internet Archive.
- "Thoughts on the Negro Problem". The North American Review. 153 (421): 641–660. 1891. JSTOR 25102288.
- "Edward Augustus Freeman". The English Historical Review. 7 (27): 497–509. July 1892. JSTOR 546513.
- "The Migrations of the Races of Man Considered Historically". The Contemporary Review. LXII: 128-149. July 1892 – via Internet Archive.
- "Political Organizations in the United States and England". The North American Review. 156 (434): 105–118. January 1893. JSTOR 25102516.
- "The Teaching of Civic Duty". Educational Review. VI. 1893 – via HathiTrust.
- "Equality". The Century; A Popular Quarterly. LVI (3): 459-468. July 1898 – via Internet Archive.
- "Commercial Education". The North American Review. 168 (511): 694–707. June 1899. JSTOR 25119202.
- "Some Reflections on the State of Cuba". The North American Review. 174 (545): 445–456. April 1902. JSTOR 25119225.
- "The Letters of Lord Acton". The North American Review. 178 (570): 698–710. May 1904. JSTOR 25119564.
- Villari, Luigi, ed. (1905). "Introduction". The Balkan question: The Present Condition of the Balkans and of European Responsibilities. New York: E. P. Dutton and Company. p. 1-15 – via Internet Archive.
- "The Rhodope Balkans: Discussion James Bryce, Mr. Hogarth, Noel Buxton and Colonel Maunsell". The Geographical Journal. 28 (1): 24–30. July 1906. doi:10.2307/1775864. JSTOR 1775864.
- "The Influence of National Character and Historical Environment on the Development of the Common Law". Journal of the Society of Comparative Legislation. 8 (2): 203–216. 1907. JSTOR 751827.
- "What is Progress?". The Atlantic Monthly. C (2): 145–156. August 1907 – via Internet Archive.
- "The Methods and Conditions of Legislation in Our Time". Columbia Law Review. 8 (3): 157–171. March 1908. doi:10.2307/1109423. JSTOR 1109423.
- "The Relations of Political Science to History and to Practice: Presidential Address, Fifth Annual Meeting of the American Political Science Association". The American Political Science Review. 3 (1): 1–19. February 1909. doi:10.2307/1945905. JSTOR 1945905.
- "Personal Reminiscences of Charles Darwin and of the Reception of the "Origin of Species"". Proceedings of the American Philosophical Society. 48 (193): iii–xiv. December 1909. JSTOR 984063.
- "CLASSICAL STUDIES". The Journal of Education. 71 (7): 177. 17 February 1910. JSTOR 42812945.
- "The Hope of Art in America". Art and Progress. 3 (1): 383–385. November 1911. JSTOR 20560514.
- "Stray Thoughts on American Literature". The North American Review. 201 (712): 357–362. March 1915. JSTOR 25108395.
- "England's Real Attitude on Ireland". Current History. 12 (6): 939–942. September 1920. JSTOR 45329011.

== Famous quotations ==
- "Patriotism consists not in waving the flag, not in shouting "our country right or wrong", but in so valuing our country and respecting its best traditions as to desire and to strive that our country shall be righteous as well as strong."
- "No government demands so much from the citizen as Democracy and none gives back so much. Any free people that has responded to the call of duty and come out of a terrible ordeal unshaken in courage, undimmed in vision, with its vital force still fresh and strong, need not fear to face the future."
- "Read only the best books. There are plenty of them, far more than you will ever find time to read, and when they are to be had it is a pity to waste time on any others...Goethe once said of someone he knew: "He is a dull man. If he were a book, I would not read him.""
- "Time is the measure of everything in life, and every kind of work ought to be adjusted to it...Time is worth more than money because by its judicious employment more enjoyment can be secured than money can purchase."
- "Excessive anger against human stupidity is itself one of the most provoking forms of stupidity."

== Portrayals ==
- Charles David Richards (2024) - Unsinkable (Film)

== See also ==
- "A Wine of Wizardry" - Poem by George Sterling which Bryce indirectly made controversial.

Parliament of the United Kingdom
Preceded by Joseph d'Aguilar Samuda	Member of Parliament for Tower Hamlets; 1880–1885	Constituency abolished
New constituency	Member of Parliament for Aberdeen South; 1885–1907	Succeeded by George Esslemont
Political offices
Preceded by Robert Bourke	Under-Secretary of State for Foreign Affairs; 1886	Succeeded by Sir James Fergusson
Preceded by The Duke of Rutland	Chancellor of the Duchy of Lancaster; 1892–1894	Succeeded by The Lord Tweedmouth
Preceded by A. J. Mundella	President of the Board of Trade; 1894–1895	Succeeded by Charles Thomson Ritchie
Preceded by Walter Long	Chief Secretary for Ireland; 1905–1907	Succeeded by Augustine Birrell
Diplomatic posts
Preceded by Sir Henry Mortimer Durand	British Ambassador to the United States; 1907–1913	Succeeded by Sir Cecil Spring Rice
Peerage of the United Kingdom
New creation	Viscount Bryce; 1914–1922	Extinct
