= Gordon Brice =

English cricketer and footballer

Personal information
- Full name: Gordon Harry Joseph Brice
- Date of birth: 4 May 1924
- Place of birth: Bedford, England
- Date of death: 3 March 2003 (aged 78)
- Place of death: Bedford, England
- Position: Centre-half

Youth career
- Bedford St. Clement's

Senior career*
Years	Team	Apps	(Gls)
1946–1947	Luton Town	13	(0)
1947–1948	Wolverhampton Wanderers	12	(0)
1948–1953	Reading	198	(9)
1953–1956	Fulham	87	(1)
1956–1957	Ayr United	20	(0)
Total		330	(10)
- * Club domestic league appearances and goals

Gordon Harry Joseph Brice (4 May 1924 – 3 March 2003) was an English footballer and first class cricketer. He variously played football for Luton Town, Wolverhampton Wanderers, Reading, Fulham and Ayr United. During the football off season he played first class cricket for Northamptonshire.

== Life ==
Brice was born in Bedford on 4 May 1924 and educated at Bedford Modern School. In his last year at school he was Captain of five sports: boxing, fives, athletics, cricket and rugby.

After school Brice signed with Luton Town but his time there was cut short by World War II when he joined the Royal Marines, training for nine months at the Royal Marine Barracks, Chatham. After Chatham he served on a warship in South America and Africa but never encountered armed conflict.

After war service he rejoined Luton Town but soon moved to Wolverhampton Wanderers, in 1945, and later Reading during the 1946/47 season. Between 1948 and 1953 he played 198 games for Reading predominantly at centre-half and scoring nine goals. He held the record of playing 148 consecutive appearances for Reading until that record was beaten by Steve Death.

Brice later joined Fulham in 1953, before retiring in 1956 and moving to Ayr where he ran a hotel and made some appearances for Ayr United. In 1961 he moved back to his hometown of Bedford, where he established a building company, later moving to Alicante in Spain in 1981.

During the football off season, Brice appeared in 25 first-class matches as a righthanded batsman who bowled right arm fast medium. He scored 412 runs with a highest score of 82 not out and took 72 wickets with a best performance of eight for 124.

Brice married twice and died in Bedford in March 2003.
