= Bryce Campbell =

Bryce Campbell may refer to:

- Bryce Campbell (Australian footballer) (born 1984), an Australian rules football player
- Bryce Campbell (rugby union) (born 1994), an American rugby union player
