= Annan Bryce =

British politician (1841–1923)

John Annan Bryce
- Born: 12 August 1843; Belfast
- Died: 26 June 1923 (aged 79); London
- Resting place: Grange Cemetery, Edinburgh
- Occupations: businessman, politician, Member of Parliament (MP)
- Spouse: Violet L'Estrange
- Children: 2 sons and 2 daughters, including Marjery Bryce
- Parents: James Bryce (geologist) (father); Margaret Young (mother)
- Relatives: James Bryce, 1st Viscount Bryce (brother); Thomas Hastie Bryce (cousin)

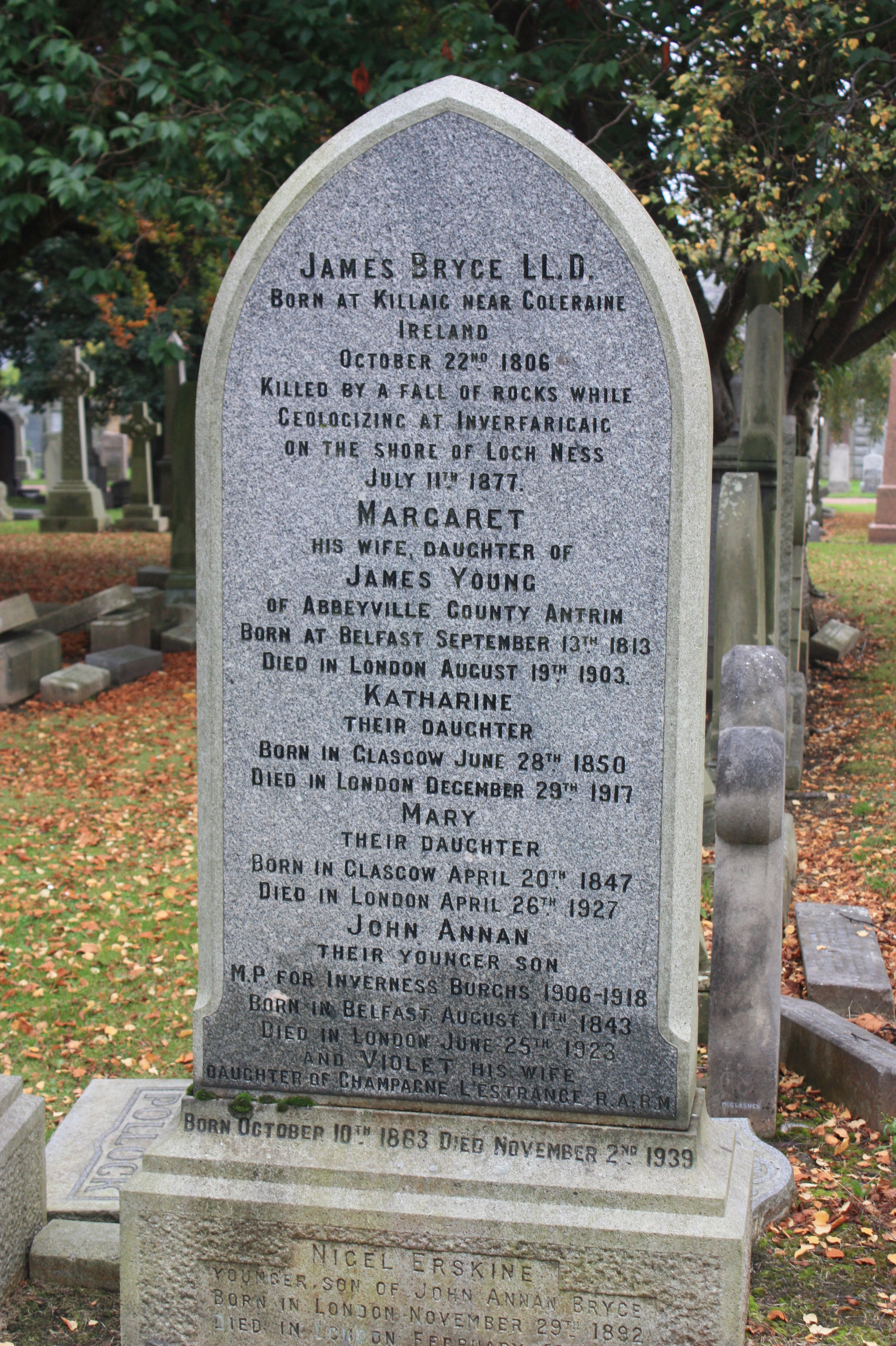
The grave of John Annan Bryce, Grange Cemetery, Edinburgh

John Annan Bryce (12 August 1843 – 25 June 1923) was a British businessman and Liberal Party politician.

== Background and family ==
He was the son of the schoolmaster and geologist James Bryce and his wife Margaret Young, daughter of James Young. His elder brother was the 1st Viscount Bryce.

Bryce was educated at Balliol College, Oxford and graduated with a Bachelor of Arts, winning the Brackenbury Scholarship. He studied first at the University of Edinburgh, then made his Master of Arts at the University of Glasgow. On 2 August 1888, he married Violet L'Estrange, daughter of Captain Champagne L'Estrange. They had two sons and two daughters. His two daughters Marjery (Marjorie/Margaret) and Rosalind (Tiny) were leading the Women's Coronation Procession of suffragettes and suffragists on 17 June 1911. Annan Bryce did not support women's suffrage, wrote to the press and voted against law changes.

== Career ==
Bryce worked as merchant in India and was chairman of the Rangoon Chamber of Commerce. He served in the Legislative Council of Burma and made several expeditions into unknown regions of Siam. After his return to England, Bryce became a director of the London and County Bank. He was the director of Naval Construction & Armaments Co in 1907 and became then the director of Bombay, Baroda, and Central India Railway until 1914. During the same time he was also director of British Westinghouse, Atlas Assurance Company and of Burma Railways. He was twice a council member of the Royal Geographical Society.

In 1906, Bryce entered the British House of Commons, sitting as a Member of Parliament (MP) for Inverness Burghs until 1918. Following his first election, he was appointed to the Royal Commission on Congestion in Ireland, in which he stayed for two years.

== Ilnacullin ==
In 1910, Bryce bought from the British War Office Garnish (Garinish) Island, also known as Ilnacullin, close to Glengarriff in County Cork. Assisted by landscape architect and horticulturist Harold Peto, he created, 1911 to 1914, the sub-tropical gardens which to this day (now maintained by the Irish government) remain a notable attraction.

== Grave ==
He is buried with his parents in the south-west section of Grange Cemetery in Edinburgh at the west end of the central east–west avenue, facing south.

Parliament of the United Kingdom
Preceded by Robert Bannatyne Finlay	Member of Parliament for Inverness Burghs; 1906–1918	Constituency abolished
