= Dorothée Le Maître =

French geologist and paleontologist (1896–1990)

Dorothée Le Maître (French pronunciation: [dɔʁɔte lə mɛːtʁ]; 1 September 1896 – 26 January 1990) was a French geologist and paleontologist known for her studies of Devonian flora and fauna in North Africa and Sub-Saharan Africa. She specialized in the study of Stromatoporoidea and was one of the first women to make expeditions to observe and collect fossils from their original sites.

== Early life and education ==
Le Maître was born in Uzel, in the Brittany region of France. She was educated at Angers Free University and received her bachelor's degree from the Catholic University of Lille in 1926. She remained there for her doctoral studies and earned her Ph.D. in 1934.

== Career and research ==
Her first paper was published in 1926, the same year she earned her bachelor's degree, and as she continued her work she was published 35 times. In 1948, after her Ph.D., Le Maître became a faculty member at the University of Lille, where she was a geology researcher. In 1950, she became connected to the French National Centre for Scientific Research. Her research included work on the Spongiomorphides and included comparative research of North African and Sub-Saharan fossils to those of Europe.

== Honors and awards ==
In 1941, Le Maître was awarded the Prix Fontannes, and in 1956 she received the Kuhlmann Prize. In 1959, she was honored by the French Academy of Sciences with the Grand Prix Bonnet and was recognized for her research with the French Order des Palmas académiques. She was the president of the Société Géologique du Nord in 1949 and 1950.
