= Bryce Taylor =

Bryce Taylor may refer to:

- Bryce Taylor (basketball) (born 1986), American basketball player
- Bryce Taylor (soccer) (born 1989), American soccer player
- Brice Taylor (born 1902), American football player and coach
