= FGS =

FGS may refer to:

- Faculty of Graduate Studies
- Federal German Ship, NATO designation for German Navy ships
- Federal Government of Somalia
- Federation of Genealogical Societies
- Fellow of the Geological Society (F.G.S.)
- Fergusonite
- FG syndrome
- Fine guidance sensor
- Fine Guidance Sensor (HST), FGS for the Hubble Space Telescope
- Flagstaff railway station
- Fluorescence guided surgery
- Fo Guang Shan, a Buddhist monastic order
- For Gods Sake A common non swearing term.
- Full genome sequencing
- Geranylfarnesyl diphosphate synthase
- Functional Gen Set, see Pathway analysis

== See also ==
- FG (disambiguation)
