= William Brice (disambiguation) =

William Brice (1921–2008), American artist known for his large-scale abstract paintings

William Brice may also refer to:

- William Brice (ethnographer) (1921–2007), British ethnographer and linguist
- William O. Brice (1898–1972), United States Marine Corps General and a veteran of the Korean War

== See also ==
- William B. Rice (1840–1909), American industrialist
