= Bryce Cooper =

Australian cricketer

Personal information
- Born: 19 December 1905; Sydney, Australia
- Died: 19 May 1995 (aged 89); Sydney, Australia
- Source: ESPNcricinfo, 25 December 2016

Dr Bryce Arnot Cooper (19 December 1905 – 19 May 1995) was an Australian cricketer. He played two first-class matches for New South Wales between 1928/29 and 1929/30. He also played for Glebe and was a blue in university cricket. He was a fast bowler. He was also a sprinter, javelin thrower, and high jumper. In baseball, he was the representative of the Sydney University Club. He was prominent in university sport. He also practised medicine at the Royal Prince Alfred Hospital and gave evidence at the inquest on the death of Betty Fleming, and the subsequent trial of Thomas Langhorne Fleming on a charge of murder, in 1951.

Cooper was the only son of Thomas Bryce Arnot Cooper (died 1952), Under-secretary for Works in the NSW parliament and Fannie Cooper, née Barbour, who married on 11 February 1903. Fannie was a daughter of Robert Barbour MLA (1827–1895).

== See also ==
- List of New South Wales representative cricketers
