= Thomas Hastie Bryce =

Scottish anatomist, medical author and archaeologist

James Bryce FRSE FRS
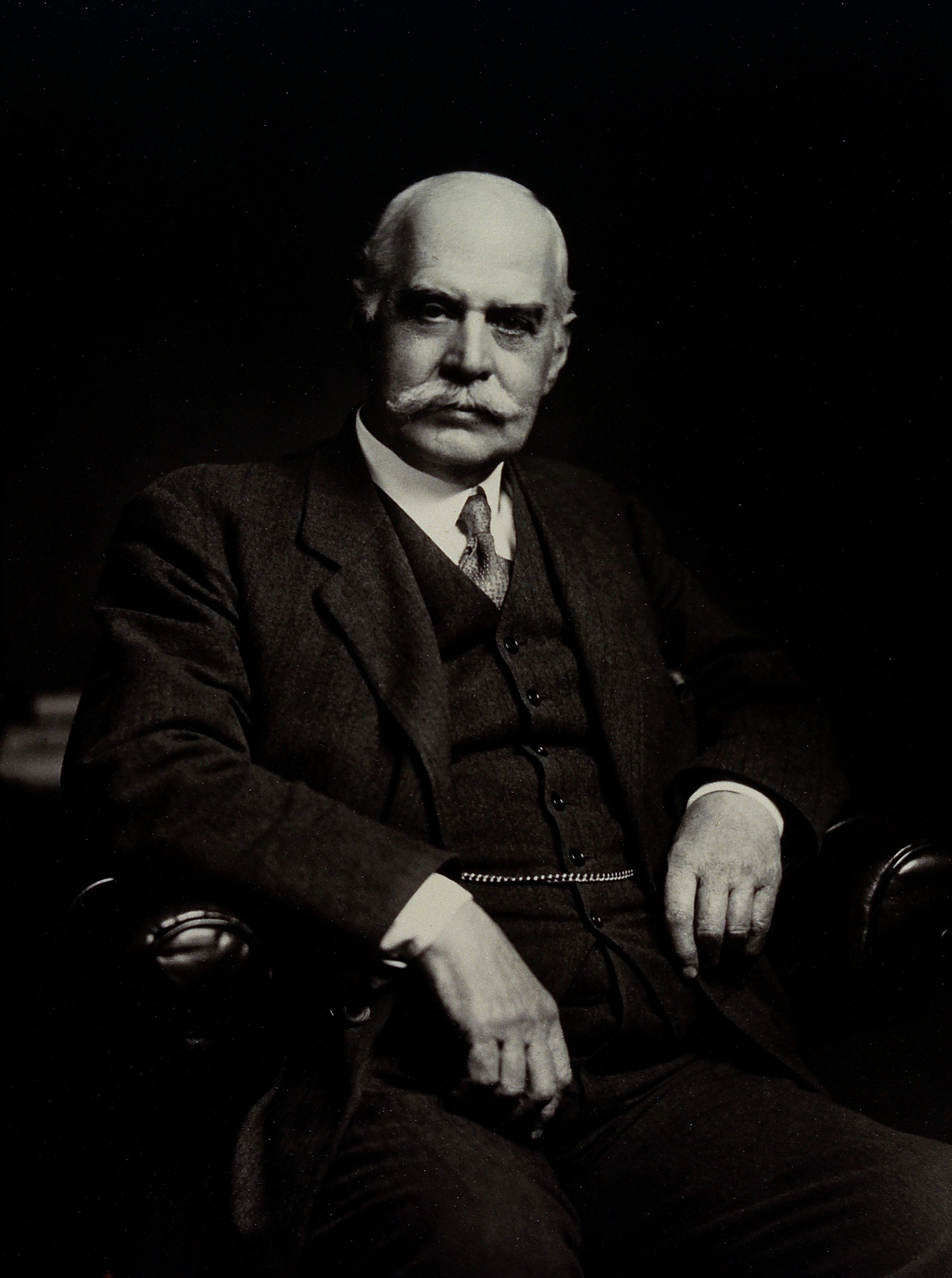
- Born: 20 October 1862; Dalkeith, near Edinburgh
- Died: 16 May 1946 (aged 83); Oxford
- Education: University of Edinburgh
- Occupations: Professor of Anatomy; Curator of the Hunterian Museum in Glasgow
- Known for: Teacher-Bryce Ovum TB-1
- Spouse: Mary Russell Landale Wilson (m. 1889)
- Father: William Bryce MD
- Relatives: James Bryce, 1st Viscount Bryce (cousin); John Annan Bryce (cousin)
- Honors: LLD
- Scientific career
- Fields: anatomy medicine archeology
- Workplaces: Queen Margaret College; University of Glasgow
- Thesis: Maturation of the ovum in Echinus : a cytological study with special reference to the reduction of the chromosomes (1901)

Thomas Hastie Bryce LLD FRS FSA FRSE (20 October 1862 – 16 May 1946) was a Scottish anatomist, medical author and archaeologist. He was Regius Professor of Anatomy at the University of Glasgow 1909 to 1935 and also Curator of the Hunterian Museum in Glasgow. He is primarily remembered for his work on human embryology and comparative anatomy. His students referred to him as Tommy Bryce.

== Early life ==
Bryce was born in Dalkeith, just south of Edinburgh on 20 October 1862, the son of Dr William Bryce.

He was educated at Edinburgh Collegiate School and then studied medicine at the University of Edinburgh, graduating MB, CM. In 1901 he obtained his MD from the University of Edinburgh with a thesis entitled, “Maturation of the ovum in Echinus".

== Professional life ==
He became a Demonstrator in Anatomy at the newly formed Queen Margaret College in 1890. In 1892 he became a lecturer in anatomy (working under Professor William Turner) and continued in this role until 1909 when he received the Anatomy chair at the University of Glasgow where he worked until 1935. During this period he was also Curator of the university's Hunterian Museum.

His work on the human ovum, in conjunction with Professor Teacher led to an ovum type being named the Teacher-Bryce Ovum, in medical terms usually referred to as TB-1.

He was a keen amateur archaeologist, submitting over 40 papers to the Society of Antiquities of Scotland. In 1901 he began excavating the cairns of the Isle of Arran and published his findings almost annually between 1902-1910 and a summary was included in "The Book of Arran".

He was elected a Fellow of the Royal Society of Edinburgh in 1898 and won its Keith Medal for 1903 to 1905. He served as the Society's Vice President 1925 to 1928. He was elected as a Fellow of the Royal Society in 1922. He was president of the Anatomical Society 1929 to 1932 and also served as president of the Glasgow Archaeological Society.

== Family and later life ==
In 1889 he married Mary Russell Landale Wilson (d.1934).

He was the nephew of the eminent Edinburgh surgeon, James Bryce FRSE (1766–1826).

He was a cousin to James Bryce, Viscount Bryce and a nephew of the geologist James Bryce (1806-1877).

He retired to Peebles and in 1945, at the end of the Second World War, he moved to Oxford to be with his son, Major W.T.B. Bryce, F.R.I.B.A. He died in Oxford on 16 May 1946.

== Publications ==
- The Early Development and Imbedding of the Human Ovum (1908)
- Quain's Anatomy Volume 1: Embryology (1908)
- The Book of Arran (1910)
- Quain's Anatomy: Bones and Joints (1915)
- Quain's Anatomy: Muscles (1923)
- The Anthropological History of the Scottish People (1924)
