= Bryce, Arizona =

CDP in Graham County, Arizona

- Census-designated place
- Location of Bryce in Graham County, Arizona.

- Location within Arizona Location within the United States
- Coordinates: 32°55′44″N 109°49′40″W
- Country: United States
- State: Arizona
- County: Graham

Area
  - Total: 0.84 sq mi (2.18 km^{2})
  - Land: 0.84 sq mi (2.18 km^{2})
  - Water: 0 sq mi (0.00 km^{2})
- Elevation: 2,832 ft (863 m)

Population (2020)
  - Total: 173
  - Density: 205.6/sq mi (79.38/km^{2})
- Time zone: UTC-7 (Mountain (MST))
- ZIP code: 85543
- Area code: 928
- GNIS feature ID: 2582741

Bryce is a census-designated place in Graham County, Arizona, United States. Its population was 173 as of the 2020 census.

Bryce is located in the upper Gila River valley, approximately two miles north of Pima and north of the Gila River. The first settlement at Bryce was made in 1883. Bryce is named for settler and shipbuilder Ebenezer Bryce, a Mormon pioneer from Scotland, who is best known as the eponym of Bryce Canyon National Park in Utah.

== Demographics ==
Historical population
Census	Pop.	Note	%±
1920	167		—
1930	212		26.9%
2010	175		—
2020	173		−1.1%
U.S. Decennial Census

Bryce first appeared on the 1920 U.S. Census as Bryce/Precinct 17 of Graham County and in 1930 as District 17. It reported a majority White population in 1930. With the combination of all Arizona county precincts and districts into three districts each in 1940, it did not formally appear again until 2010, when it was made a census-designated place (CDP).
