= Brice Achkir =

Electrical engineer

Brice Achkir from the Cisco Systems, Inc., San Jose, CA was named Fellow of the Institute of Electrical and Electronics Engineers (IEEE) in 2014 for contributions to diagnostics of physical layer design in gigabit digital transmission systems.
