= Brejcha =

Brejcha (feminine: Brejchová) is a Czech surname. It was probably derived from the given name Brikcius (Czech form of Bricius), but there is also a theory that it was derived from the Old Czech verb brejchat, i.e. 'to wade'. Notable people with the surname include:

- Boris Brejcha (born 1981), German DJ and producer
- Hana Brejchová (1946–2024), Czech actress
- Jana Brejchová (1940–2026), Czech actress
- Jaroslav Brejcha, Czech slalom canoeist
- Nikola Brejchová (born 1974), Czech javelin thrower
- Ondřej Brejcha (born 1994), Czech footballer
