= Bryce Commission (House of Lords reform) =

The Bryce Commission was a Commission set up in 1917 to consider reform of the House of Lords.
