= Bricius (disambiguation) =

Bricius most often refers to Bricius de Douglas, bishop of Moray (died 1222).

Bricius or Brice may also refer to:

== People ==
=== Given name (Bricius) ===
- Bricius of Tours also known as Saint Brice of Tours (c. 370–444), Roman saint, fourth Bishop of Tours

=== Given name (Brice) ===
- Brice Achkir, electrical engineer
- Brice Aka (born 1983), Ivorian footballer
- Brice Armstrong (1936–2020), American anime voice actor
- Brice Assie (born 1983), Ivorian basketball player
- Brice Beckham (born 1976), American actor
- Brice Blanc (born 1973), French jockey
- Brice Bosnich, Australian inorganic chemist
- Brice Catherin (born 1981), French composer and cellist
- Brice Disque (1879–1960), American soldier
- Brice Dja Djédjé (born 1990), Ivorian football player
- Brice Feillu (born 1985), French cyclist
- Brice Herbert Goldsborough (1889–1927), American aviator
- Brice Goldsborough (judge) (1803–1867), justice of the Maryland Court of Appeals
- Brice Guidon (born 1985), French kickboxer
- Brice Guyart (born 1981), French fencer
- Brice Hortefeux (born 1958), French politician
- Brice Hunter (1974–2004), American football player
- Brice Jovial (born 1984), French footballer
- Brice Lalonde (born 1946), French politician
- Brice Leverdez (born 1986), French badminton player
- Brice Long (born 1971), American country music singer
- Brice McCain (born 1986), American football player
- Brice Mack (1917–2008), background painter and director at Disney
- Brice Marden (born 1938), American artist
- Brice Matthieussent (born 1950), French literary translator
- Brice Mutton (1890–1949), Australian politician
- Brice Owona (born 1989), Cameroonian football player
- Brice Panel (born 1983), French sprinter
- Brice Parain (1897–1971), French philosopher and essayist
- Brice Pollock (born 2005), American football player
- Brice Taylor (1902–1974), American footballer
- Brice Tirabassi (born 1977), French rally driver
- Brice Turang (born 1999), American baseball player
- Brice Vounang (born 1982), Cameroonian basketball player
- Brice Wembangomo (born 1996), Norwegian footballer
- Brice Wiggins, American attorney and politician

=== Middle name ===
- C. Brice Ratchford (1920–1997), president of the University of Missouri
- Guy Brice Parfait Kolélas (1959–2021), Congolese politician
- Severin Brice Bikoko, Camroonian football player

=== Surname ===
- Brice (surname)

=== Characters ===
- Wee-Bey Brice and son Namond Brice, characters on the HBO drama The Wire
- Tom Brice, in Across the Continent

== Places ==
=== Saint-Brice ===
- Saint-Brice, Charente, a commune in the Charente department in southwestern France
- Saint-Brice, Gironde, a commune in the Gironde department in Aquitaine in southwestern France
- Saint-Brice, Manche, a commune in the Manche department in Normandy in north-western France
- Saint-Brice, Mayenne, a commune in the Mayenne department in north-western France
- Saint-Brice, Orne, a commune in the Orne department in north-western France
- Saint-Brice, Seine-et-Marne, a commune in the Seine-et-Marne department in the Île-de-France region in north-central France

=== Other places ===
- Brice, Ohio, a village in Franklin County, Ohio, US
- Mount Brice, a mountain west of Mount Abrams in the Behrendt Mountains

== See also ==
- Bryce (disambiguation)
