= 2021 Sport Club Internacional season =

Internacional
2021 season
- President: Alessandro Barcellos
- Manager: (Spain) Miguel Ángel Ramírez (until June 11, 2021) (Brazil) Osmar Loss (interim) (Uruguay) Diego Aguirre (since June 20, 2021)
- Stadium: Estádio Beira-Rio
- Série A: 12th
- Campeonato Gaúcho: Runners-up
- Copa Libertadores: Round of 16
- Copa do Brasil: Third round
- Top goalscorer: League: Yuri Alberto (12); All: Yuri Alberto (19)
- Biggest win: 6–1 vs. Aimoré; 6–1 vs. Olimpia
- Biggest defeat: 1–5 vs. Fortaleza
Home colours	Away colours	Third colours

The 2021 season is Sport Club Internacional's 111th season in existence. As well as the Campeonato Brasileiro, the club competes in the Copa do Brasil, the Campeonato Gaúcho and the Copa Libertadores.

== Season review ==
=== Pre-season ===
On March 2, 2021, Internacional announced the hiring of new manager Miguel Ángel Ramírez. After a late finish to the 2020 season due to the COVID-19 pandemic, most first team players did not return to training until March 9 to prepare for the remainder of the Campeonato Gaúcho.

== First-team squad ==
As of 20 April 2021

Squad no.	Name	Nationality	Position(s)	Date of birth	Signed from
Goalkeepers
1	Danilo Fernandes	(Brazil)	GK	3 April 1988 (age 38)	(Brazil) Sport
12	Marcelo Lomba	(Brazil)	GK	18 December 1986 (age 39)	(Brazil) Bahia
32	Vitor Hugo	(Brazil)	GK	27 July 2001 (age 25)	Youth Sector
42	Daniel	(Brazil)	GK	6 May 1994 (age 32)	Youth Sector
Defenders
4	Rodrigo Moledo	(Brazil)	CB	27 October 1987 (age 39)	(Greece) Panathinaikos
14	Lucas Ribeiro	(Brazil)	CB	19 January 1999 (age 27)	(Germany) Hoffenheim
15	Víctor Cuesta	(Argentina)	CB	19 November 1988 (age 37)	(Argentina) Independiente
35	Zé Gabriel	(Brazil)	CB	21 January 1999 (age 27)	Youth Sector
41	Pedro Henrique	(Brazil)	CB	31 January 2001 (age 25)	Youth Sector
Fullbacks
2	Heitor	(Brazil)	RB	5 November 2000 (age 26)	Youth Sector
20	Moisés	(Brazil)	LB	11 March 1995 (age 31)	(Brazil) Bahia
22	Rodinei	(Brazil)	RB	29 January 1992 (age 34)	(Brazil) Flamengo
26	Saravia	(Argentina)	RB	16 June 1993 (age 33)	(Portugal) Porto
36	Léo Borges	(Brazil)	LB	3 January 2001 (age 25)	Youth Sector
38	Mazetti	(Brazil)	RB	2 February 2001 (age 25)	Youth Sector
Midfielders
8	Edenílson	(Brazil)	CM/DM	18 December 1989 (age 36)	(Italy) Udinese
13	Rodrigo Dourado	(Brazil)	DM/CM	17 June 1994 (age 32)	Youth Sector
18	Praxedes	(Brazil)	CM	8 February 2002 (age 24)	Youth Sector
19	Rodrigo Lindoso	(Brazil)	CM/DM	6 June 1989 (age 37)	(Brazil) Botafogo
21	Boschilia	(Brazil)	AM/LM	5 March 1996 (age 30)	(France) Monaco
27	Maurício	(Brazil)	AM/LM/RM	22 June 2001 (age 25)	(Brazil) Cruzeiro
30	Johnny	(United States)	CM	20 September 2001 (age 25)	Youth Sector
33	Nonato	(Brazil)	CM/AM	3 March 1998 (age 28)	(Brazil) São Caetano
37	Lucas Ramos	(Brazil)		3 January 2001 (age 25)	Youth Sector
88	Patrick	(Brazil)	LM/AM/CM	29 July 1992 (age 34)	(Brazil) Sport Recife
Attacking Midfielders
10	Taison	(Brazil)	RW	13 January 1988 (age 38)	(Ukraine) Shakhtar Donetsk
16	Carlos Palacios	(Chile)	RW/CF	20 July 2000 (age 26)	(Chile) Española
17	Thiago Galhardo	(Brazil)	CF/AM	20 July 1989 (age 37)	(Brazil) Ceará
23	Marcos Guilherme	(Brazil)	RW/AM	5 August 1995 (age 31)	(Saudi Arabia) Al Wehda
31	João Peglow	(Brazil)	RW	7 January 2002 (age 24)	Youth Sector
Attackers
9	Guerrero	(Peru)	CF	1 January 1984 (age 42)	(Brazil) Flamengo
11	Yuri Alberto	(Brazil)	CF	18 March 2001 (age 25)	(Brazil) Santos
47	Caio Vidal	(Brazil)	RW/RM	4 November 2000 (age 26)	Youth Sector

== Transfers ==
=== Transfers in ===
Entry date	Position	No.	Player	From club	Fee	Ref.
16 April 2021	Midfielder	10	(Brazil) Taison	(Ukraine) Shakhtar Donetsk	None	

=== Loans in ===
Start date	End date	Position	No.	Player	To club	Fee	Ref.
22 March 2021	31 December 2021	FW		(Chile) Carlos Palacios	(Chile) Unión Española	None	

=== Loans out ===
Start date	End date	Position	No.	Player	To club	Fee	Ref.
16 March 2021	31 December 2021	FW		(Brazil) Guilherme Pato	(Brazil) Cuiabá	None	

== Competitions ==
=== Overview ===
Competition	First match	Last match	Starting round	Final position	Record							
Competition	First match	Last match	Starting round	Final position	Pld	W	D	L	GF	GA	GD	Win %
Série A	30 May 2021	9 December 2021	Matchday 1	12th	38	12	12	14	44	42	+2	31.58
Campeonato Gaúcho	1 March 2021	23 May 2021	Matchday 1	Runners-up	15	8	3	4	30	14	+16	53.33
Copa do Brasil	3 June 2021	10 June 2021	Third round	Third round	2	1	0	1	2	3	−1	50.00
Copa Libertadores	20 April 2021	22 July 2021	Group stage	Round of 16	8	3	3	2	12	5	+7	37.50
Total					63	24	18	21	88	64	+24	38.10

Source: Competitions

=== Campeonato Gaúcho ===
==== League table ====
Pos	Team	Pld	W	D	L	GF	GA	GD	Pts	Qualification or relegation
1	Grêmio	11	7	3	1	23	9	+14	24	Qualification to Knockout stage
2	Internacional	11	7	2	2	24	9	+15	23	Qualification to Knockout stage
3	Juventude	11	5	2	4	14	12	+2	17	Qualification to Knockout stage
4	Caxias	11	4	5	2	13	11	+2	17	Qualification to Knockout stage
5	Ypiranga-RS	11	4	4	3	20	15	+5	16	

Updated to match(es) played on 25 April 2021. Source: Soccerway
Rules for classification: 1) Points; 2) Wins; 3) Goal difference; 4) Goals scored; 5) fewest red cards; 6) fewest yellow cards; 7) Draw in the headquarters of the FGF.

==== Matches ====
1 March 2021 1	Internacional	1–0	Juventude	Porto Alegre
20:00	Guilherme Pato 13', (yellow card) 90+3'; Amaya (yellow card) 64'; Tiago Barbosa (yellow card) 90+2'	Report	(yellow card) 16' João Paulo; (yellow card) 54' Emerson; (yellow card) 90+3' Paulo Henrique	Stadium: Estádio Beira-Rio; Attendance: 0 Referee: Douglas Schwengber da Silva

4 March 2021 2	Pelotas	2–2	Internacional	Pelotas
20:00	Bustamante (yellow card) 16'; Marcelo Mineiro 20'; Itaqui 90+1'	Report	29' Johnny; (yellow card) 33' Pedro Henrique; (yellow card) 38' João Felix; 73' Lucas Ramos	Stadium: Boca do Lobo; Attendance: 0 Referee: Lucas Guimarães Rechatiko Horn

8 March 2021 3	Internacional	1–2	São Luiz	Porto Alegre
20:00	Pedro Henrique (yellow card) 40'; Yuri Alberto 62'	Report	38' Hugo Almeida; (red card) 87' Jadson; 90+4' (o.g.) Tiago Barbosa	Stadium: Estádio Beira-Rio; Attendance: 0 Referee: Francisco Soares Dias

14 March 2021 4	Internacional	4–2	Ypiranga	Porto Alegre
20:00	Yuri Alberto 6'; Zé Gabriel 65'; Edenílson 90' (pen.); Patrick 90+5'	Report	(yellow card) 40' Mikael; 44' Cristiano; 50' (pen.) Caprini; (yellow card) 88' Luís Eduardo	Stadium: Estádio Beira-Rio; Attendance: 0 Referee: Jean Pierre Gonçalves Lima

21 March 2021 5	Novo Hamburgo	0–1	Internacional	Novo Hamburgo
20:00		Report	62' Marcos Guilherme	Stadium: Estádio do Vale; Attendance: 0 Referee: Erico Andrade de Carvalho

24 March 2021 6	Internacional	2–0	Caxias	Porto Alegre
22:00	Patrick (yellow card) 34'; Praxedes (yellow card) 53'; Edenílson 69'; Yuri Alberto (yellow card) 77'; Heitor (yellow card) 80'; Thiago Galhardo 90+3'	Report	(yellow card) 11' Mazola; (yellow card) 34' Eduardo Diniz; (yellow card) 81' Matheuzinho; (red card) 89' Guilherme Mattis	Stadium: Estádio Beira-Rio; Attendance: 0 Referee: Douglas Schwengber da Silva

27 March 2021 7	Brasil de Pelotas	1–2	Internacional	Pelotas
20:00	Bruno Paraíba 18' (pen.), (yellow card) 64'; Bruno Matias (yellow card) 65'; Leandro Camilo (yellow card) 66'; Artur (yellow card) 70'; Everton Dias (yellow card) 90+2'	Report	3' Abel Hernández; 68', (yellow card) 90+4' Rodrigo Dourado; (yellow card) 89' Léo Borges; (yellow card) 90+4' Lucas Ribeiro	Stadium: Estádio Bento Freitas; Attendance: 0 Referee: Roger Goulart

31 March 2021 8	Internacional	0–0	São José	Porto Alegre
20:00	Victor Cuesta (yellow card) 83'	Report	(yellow card) 41' Alessandro Vinícius	Stadium: Estádio Beira-Rio; Attendance: 0 Referee: Daniel Nobre Bins

3 April 2021 9	Grêmio	1–0	Internacional	Porto Alegre
22:15	Vanderson (yellow card) 85'; Chú 88', (yellow card) 89'	Report		Stadium: Arena do Grêmio; Attendance: 0 Referee: Anderson Daronco

14 April 2021 10	Aimoré	1–6	Internacional	São Leopoldo
21:30	Neto Baiano (yellow card) 39'; Marabá (red card) 42'; Darlan 55'; Tcharles (yellow card) 83'	Report	Heitor 19'; Thiago Galhardo 40' (pen.), 52' 62'; Víctor Cuesta (red card) 43'; Tcharles 89' (o.g.); Guerrero 90+1'	Stadium: Estádio Cristo Rei; Attendance: 0 Referee: Vinicius Gomes do Amaral

24 April 2021 11	Internacional	5–0	Esportivo	Porto Alegre
21:00	Zé Gabriel 5'; Nonato 33'; Yuri Alberto 41' (pen.); Rodrigo Dourado 61'; Rodinei 67'	Report	(yellow card) 77' Júnior Alves; (yellow card) 90' Samuel	Stadium: Estádio Beira-Rio; Attendance: 0 Referee: Jonathan Benkenstein Pinheiro

==== Knockout stage ====
===== Semi-finals =====
2 May 2021 First leg	Juventude	1–0	Internacional	Bento Gonçalves
16:00	Matheus Peixoto (yellow card) 45+1'; Eltinho (yellow card) 71'; Marcos Vinicios 72'	Report	(yellow card) 45' Lucas Ribeiro; (yellow card) 67' Maurício; (yellow card) 86' Rodrigo Lindoso	Stadium: Estádio Montanha dos Vinhedos; Attendance: 0 Referee: Douglas Schwengber da Silva

8 May 2021 Second leg	Internacional	4–1 (4–2 agg.)	Juventude	Porto Alegre
19:00	Yuri Alberto 43'; Maurício 45+1'; Edenílson 63' (pen.); Víctor Cuesta (yellow card) 66'; Rodinei 78'	Report	(yellow card) 36' Wescley; (yellow card) 62' Marcelo Carné; 68' (pen.) Matheus Peixoto	Stadium: Estádio Beira-Rio; Attendance: 0 Referee: Daniel Nobre Bins

===== Finals =====
16 May 2021 First leg	Internacional	1–2	Grêmio	Porto Alegre
16:00	Galhardo 27'; Dourado (yellow card) 56'; Praxedes (yellow card) 90+4'	Report	(yellow card) 18' L. Pereira; (yellow card) 49' Maicon; 58' D. Souza; (yellow card) 73' Rafinha; (yellow card) 82' Ruan; 88' Ricardinho; (yellow card) 90+3' F. Henrique	Stadium: Estádio Beira-Rio; Attendance: 0 Referee: Anderson Daronco

23 May 2021 Second leg	Grêmio	1–1 (3–2 agg.)	Internacional	Porto Alegre
16:00	Diogo Barbosa (yellow card) 19'; Rafinha (red card) 38'; Thiago Santos (yellow card) 45+5'; Ferreira 45+6'; Bruno Cortez (yellow card) 90+6'	Report	(yellow card) 23' Rodinei; (red card) 39' Yuri Alberto; (yellow card) 55' Lucas Ribeiro; 67', (yellow card) 77' Rodrigo Dourado; (yellow card) 90+2' Edenílson	Stadium: Arena do Grêmio; Attendance: 0 Referee: Leandro Vuaden

=== Copa Libertadores ===
Pos	Team	Pld	W	D	L	GF	GA	GD	Pts	Qualification	INT	OLI	TAC	CAR
1	(Brazil) Internacional	6	3	1	2	12	5	+7	10	Round of 16	—	6–1	4–0	0–0
2	(Paraguay) Olimpia	6	3	0	3	13	14	−1	9	Round of 16	0–1	—	6–2	2–1
3	(Venezuela) Deportivo Táchira	6	3	0	3	14	17	−3	9	Copa Sudamericana	2–1	3–2	—	7–2
4	(Bolivia) Always Ready	6	2	1	3	8	11	−3	7		2–0	1–2	2–0	—

Source: CONMEBOL
Rules for classification: 1) Points; 2) Goal difference; 3) Goals scored; 4) Away goals scored; 5) CONMEBOL ranking.

20 April 2021 1	Always Ready (Bolivia)	2–0	(Brazil) Internacional	El Alto, Bolivia
19:15 UTC−3	Vander Sacramento (yellow card) 9'; Fernando Saucedo 53'; Harold Cummings (yellow card) 65'; Carmelo Algarañaz (yellow card) 83', (goal) 90+5'	Report	(yellow card) 56' Heitor; (yellow card) 62' Maurício; (yellow card) 69' Moisés; (yellow card) 88' Zé Gabriel	Stadium: Estadio Municipal de Villa Ingenio; Attendance: 0 Referee: Nicolás Gallo (Colombia)

27 April 2021 2	Internacional (Brazil)	4–0	(Venezuela) Deportivo Táchira	Porto Alegre, Brazil
19:15 UTC−3	Víctor Cuesta 20'; Patrick 24', (yellow card) 25'; Thiago Galhardo 43', (yellow card) 44'; Carlos Palacios (yellow card) 45' (yellow-red card) 59'; Yuri Alberto 43'	Report	(yellow card) 32' Pablo Camacho; (yellow card) 69' Michael Covea; (yellow card) 69' Góndola	Stadium: Beira-Rio; Attendance: 0 Referee: Andrés Matonte (Uruguay)

5 May 2021 3	Internacional (Brazil)	6–1	(Paraguay) Olimpia	Porto Alegre, Brazil
21:00 UTC−3	Víctor Cuesta 29'; Edenílson 52' (pen.), (yellow card) 54'; Thiago Galhardo 64', 71'; Yuri Alberto 77'; Caio Vidal 80'	Report	(yellow card) 18' Diego Polenta; (yellow card) 41' Alejandro Silva; (yellow card) 65', (goal) 86' (pen.) Derlis González	Stadium: Beira-Rio; Attendance: 0 Referee: Facundo Tello (Argentina)

11 May 2021 4	Deportivo Táchira (Venezuela)	2–1	(Brazil) Internacional	San Cristóbal, Venezuela
19:15 UTC−3	Lucas Gómez (yellow card) 22'; Pablo Camacho (yellow card) 26'; José Luis Granados (yellow card) 51'; Michael Covea (yellow card) 63'; Nelson Hernández 77'; Maurice Cova 86' (pen.); Carlos Vivas (yellow card) 90+3'	Report	(yellow card) 18' Rodrigo Dourado; (yellow card) 41' Renzo Saravia; 52' (pen.), (yellow card) 61' Thiago Galhardo	Stadium: Estadio Polideportivo de Pueblo Nuevo; Attendance: 0 Referee: Wilmar Roldán (Colombia)

20 May 2021 5	Olimpia (Paraguay)	0–1	(Brazil) Internacional	Asunción, Paraguay
21:00 UTC−3	Iván Torres (yellow card) 40'; Saúl Salcedo (yellow card) 61' (yellow-red card) 66'; Luis Cáceres (yellow card) 87'; Jordán Santacruz (yellow card) 92'	Report	(yellow card) 62' Edenílson; 83' Yuri Alberto; (yellow card) 84' (yellow-red card) 90' Yuri Alberto; (yellow card) 91' Marcos Guilherme	Stadium: Estadio Manuel Ferreira; Attendance: 0 Referee: Néstor Pitana (Argentina)

26 May 2021 6	Internacional (Brazil)	0–0	(Bolivia) Always Ready	Porto Alegre, Brazil
19:00 UTC−3	Rodrigo Lindoso (yellow card) 55'	Report		Stadium: Beira-Rio; Attendance: 0 Referee: Patricio Loustau (Argentina)

==== Round of 16 ====
The draw for the round of 16 was held on 1 June 2021.

15 July 2021 First leg	Olimpia (Paraguay)	0–0	(Brazil) Internacional	Asunción, Paraguay
21:30 UTC−3	Edgardo Orzuza (yellow card) 49'; Antolín Alcaraz (yellow card) 81'	Report	(yellow card) 74' Heitor; (yellow card) 81' Edenílson	Stadium: Estadio Manuel Ferreira; Attendance: 0 Referee: Patricio Loustau (Argentina)

22 July 2021 Second leg	Internacional (Brazil)	0–0 (0–0 agg.) (4–5 p)	(Paraguay) Olimpia	Porto Alegre, Brazil
21:30 UTC−3	Víctor Cuesta (yellow card) 55'; Edenílson (penalty missed) 69'	Report	(yellow card) 53' Iván Torres	Stadium: Beira-Rio; Attendance: 0 Referee: Christian Ferreyra (Uruguay)
	Penalties
	Edenílson (penalty scored); Gabriel Boschilia (penalty scored); Moisés (penalty scored); Maurício (penalty scored); Thiago Galhardo (penalty missed)		Alejandro Silva (penalty scored); Isidro Pitta (penalty scored); Braian Ojeda (penalty scored); Richard Ortiz (penalty scored); Derlis González (penalty scored)

=== Serie A ===
==== League table ====
Pos	Team	Pld	W	D	L	GF	GA	GD	Pts	Qualification or relegation
10	Santos	38	12	14	12	35	40	−5	50	Qualification for Copa Sudamericana group stage
11	Ceará	38	11	17	10	39	38	+1	50	Qualification for Copa Sudamericana group stage
12	Internacional	38	12	12	14	44	42	+2	48	Qualification for Copa Sudamericana group stage
13	São Paulo	38	11	15	12	31	39	−8	48	Qualification for Copa Sudamericana group stage
14	Athletico Paranaense	38	13	8	17	41	45	−4	47	Qualification for Copa Libertadores group stage (Note: Athletico Paranaense qualified for the Copa Libertadores group stage by winning the 2021 Copa Sudamericana.)

Source: CBF
Rules for classification: 1) points; 2) wins; 3) goal difference; 4) goals scored; 5) head-to-head results (only between two teams); 6) fewest red cards; 7) fewest yellow cards; 8) drawing of lots.

==== Results summary ====
Overall								Home						Away					
Pld	W	D	L	GF	GA	GD	Pts	W	D	L	GF	GA	GD	W	D	L	GF	GA	GD
38	12	12	14	44	42	+2	48	8	6	5	29	22	+7	4	6	9	15	20	−5

==== Results by round ====
Round	1	2	3	4	5	6	7	8	9	10	11	12	13	14	15	16	17	18	19	20	21	22	23	24	25	26	27	28	29	30	31	32	33	34	35	36	37	38
Ground	H	A	A	H	H	A	A	H	A	H	A	H	A	H	A	H	A	A	H	A	H	H	A	A	H	H	A	H	A	H	A	H	A	H	A	H	H	A
Result	D	L	W	L	D	W	D	L	D	L	D	W	L	D	W	W	D	D	D	W	W	W	L	D	W	W	L	D	L	W	L	W	L	L	L	D	L	L
Position	10	17	13	14	13	13	13	14	14	14	15	13	14	14	11	9	10	10	6	9	7	7	7	8	7	7	7	6	7	7	7	7	7	8	9	10	12	12

Postponed

Source: CBF.com

==== Matches ====
The league fixtures were announced on 24 March 2021.

30 May 2021 1	Internacional	2–2	Sport	Porto Alegre
20:30	Edenílson 19' (pen.); Moisés (yellow card) 33'; Maurício (yellow card) 33'; Rodrigo Lindoso 44'; Carlos Palacios (yellow card) 90+1'	Report	(yellow card) 59' Júnior Tavares; 62' (pen.) Thiago Neves; 86' André; (yellow card) 90+2' Rafael Thyere	Stadium: Estádio Beira-Rio; Attendance: 0 Referee: Vinícius Gonçalves Dias Araújo

6 June 2021 2	Fortaleza	5–1	Internacional	Fortaleza
16:00	Titi 17'; Jussa (yellow card) 22'; Robson 45+2'; Yago Pikachu 47'; Zé Gabriel 55' (o.g.); Wellington Paulista 86'	Report	(yellow card) 16' Caio Vidal; (yellow card) 31' Moisés; (yellow card) 31' Thiago Galhardo; (red card) 45' Pedro Henrique; 62', (yellow card) 90+1' Praxedes; (red card) 90' Vitor Hugo	Stadium: Castelão; Attendance: 0 Referee: Paulo Roberto Alves Júnior

13 June 2021 3	Bahia	0–1	Internacional	Salvador
18:15	Matheus Teixeira (yellow card) 29'; Renan Guedes (yellow card) 40'; Matheus Bahia (yellow card) 48'; Thonny Anderson (yellow card) 90+2'	Report	31' (pen.) Edenílson; (yellow card) 43' Heitor; (yellow card) 47' Yuri Alberto; (red card) 52' Lucas Ribeiro; (yellow card) 69' Taison; (yellow card) 80' Léo Borges	Stadium: Estádio de Pituaçu; Attendance: 0 Referee: Wagner do Nascimento Magalhães

16 June 2021 4	Internacional	0–1	Atlético Mineiro	Porto Alegre
19:00	Yuri Alberto (yellow card) 11'; Víctor Cuesta (yellow card) 45+2'; Danilo Fernandes (yellow card) 90+1'	Report	2' Nathan; (yellow card) 17' Guilherme Arana	Stadium: Estádio Beira-Rio; Attendance: 0 Referee: Luiz Flávio de Oliveira

20 June 2021 5	Internacional	1–1	Ceará	Porto Alegre
16:00	Edenílson 8' (pen.); Léo Borges (yellow card) 38'; Lucas Ribeiro (yellow card) 65'	Report	(yellow card) 31' Vinicius Machado; 45+1' Lima; (yellow card) 48' Fernando Sobral; (yellow card) 71' Marlon	Stadium: Estádio Beira-Rio; Attendance: 0 Referee: Diego Pombo Lopez

24 June 2021 6	Chapecoense	1–2	Internacional	Chapecó
21:00	Ronei (yellow card) 35'; Derlan 55', (yellow card) 71'; Bruno Silva (red card) 90+6'	Report	6', (yellow card) 69', (red card) 90+7' Caio Vidal; 35' Yuri Alberto; (yellow card) 45+2' Zé Gabriel; (yellow card) 77' Edenílson; (red card) 90+9' Danilo Fernandes	Stadium: Arena Condá; Attendance: 0 Referee: Alexandre Vargas Tavares de Jesus

27 June 2021 7	América Mineiro	1–1	Internacional	Belo Horizonte
20:30	Ribamar 34'; Alan Ruschel (yellow card) 43'; Eduardo (yellow card) 52'	Report	(yellow card) 14' Lucas Ribeiro; (yellow card) 40' Thiago Galhardo; 77' Rodrigo Dourado; (yellow card) 90+18' Edenílson	Stadium: Estádio Independência; Attendance: 0 Referee: Bráulio da Silva Machado

30 June 2021 8	Internacional	1–2	Palmeiras	Porto Alegre
19:00	Caio Vidal (yellow card) 45+2'; Rodrigo Dourado (yellow card) 61'; Edenílson 65' (pen.); Víctor Cuesta (yellow card) 90+4'	Report	9' Deyverson; (red card) 62' Benjamín Kuscevic; 89' Danilo	Stadium: Estádio Beira-Rio; Attendance: 0 Referee: Paulo Roberto Alves Júnior

3 July 2021 9	Corinhtians	1–1	Internacional	São Paulo
21:00	Roni (yellow card) 35'; Jô 80'; João Victor (yellow card) 82'	Report	40' (pen.), (yellow card) 86' Edenílson; (yellow card) 42' Víctor Cuesta	Stadium: Neo Química Arena; Attendance: 0 Referee: Marcelo de Lima Henrique

7 July 2021 10	Internacional	0–2	São Paulo	Porto Alegre
21:30 UTC−3	Paulo Victor (yellow card) 25'; Rodrigo Lindoso (yellow card) 88'	Report	2' Emiliano Rigoni; (yellow card) 45+4' Bruno Alves; 54', (yellow card) 71' Igor Gomes; (yellow card) 79' Léo	Stadium: Estádio Beira-Rio; Attendance: 0 Referee: Bruno Arleu de Araújo

10 July 2021 11	Grêmio	0–0	Internacional	Porto Alegre
16:30	Victor Bobsin (yellow card) 44'	Report	(yellow card) 38' Bruno Méndez; (yellow card) 41' Rodrigo Dourado	Stadium: Arena do Grêmio; Attendance: 0 Referee: Flávio Rodrigues de Souza

18 July 2021 12	Internacional	1–0	Juventude	Porto Alegre
20:30	Paulo Victor (yellow card) 25'; Edenílson (yellow card) 31'; Pedro Henrique (yellow card) 41'; Caio Vidal (yellow card) 42'; Thiago Galhardo 51'	Report	(yellow card) 4' Vitor Mendes; (yellow card) 60' Wescley; (red card) 79' Guilherme Castilho; (yellow card) 80' Paulinho Bóia; (yellow card) 81' Marcelo Carné	Stadium: Estádio Beira-Rio; Attendance: 0 Referee: Rodolpho Toski Marques

25 July 2021 13	Athletico Paranaense	2–1	Internacional	Curitiba
18:15	Matheus Babi (yellow card) 11'; Vitinho (yellow card) 14', (goal) 45+3'; David Terans 37'; Bento (yellow card) 79'; Renato Kayzer (yellow card) 88'	Report	(yellow card) 43' Thiago Galhardo; 65' (pen.) Edenílson; (yellow card) 66' Yuri Alberto; (yellow card) 72' Gabriel Boschilia	Stadium: Arena da Baixada; Attendance: 0 Referee: Thiago Luis Scarascati

31 July 2021 14	Internacional	0–0	Cuiabá	Porto Alegre
20:00	Víctor Cuesta (yellow card) 74'; Moisés (yellow card) 87' (yellow-red card) 90'	Report	(yellow card) 51' Clayson; (yellow card) 66' Osman; (yellow card) 90+1' Paulão	Stadium: Estádio Beira-Rio; Attendance: 0 Referee: Paulo César Zanovelli

8 August 2021 15	Flamengo	0–4	Internacional	Rio de Janeiro
18:15	Diego (yellow card) 45+6'; Gabriel Barbosa (yellow card) 61' (yellow-red card) 63'	Report	19', 41', 70' Yuri Alberto; 55' Taison; (yellow card) 76' Carlos Palacios	Stadium: Maracanã; Attendance: 0 Referee: Paulo Roberto Alves Júnior

15 August 2021 16	Internacional	4–2	Fluminense	Porto Alegre
20:30	Edenílson 8', 90+3'; Yuri Alberto (yellow card) 27', (goal) 59'; Rodrigo Lindoso (yellow card) 69'; Paolo Guerrero 90+5'	Report	45' Yago Felipe; 84' Nino	Stadium: Estádio Beira-Rio; Attendance: 0 Referee: Luiz Flávio de Oliveira

22 August 2021 17	Santos	2–2	Internacional	Santos
18:15	Gabriel Pirani 24'; Madson 35'; Wagner Leonardo (yellow card) 48'	Report	8', (yellow card) 55' Gabriel Mercado; (yellow card) 39' Rodrigo Lindoso; 88' Yuri Alberto	Stadium: Vila Belmiro; Attendance: 0 Referee: Wagner do Nascimento Magalhães

29 August 2021 18	Atlético Goianiense	0–0	Internacional	Goiânia
18:15	Zé Roberto (yellow card) 59'	Report	(yellow card) 61' Rodrigo Dourado; (yellow card) 78' Carlos Palacios	Stadium: Estádio Antônio Accioly; Attendance: 0 Referee: Marielson Alves Silva

13 September 2021 20	Sport	0–1	Internacional	Recife
20:00	Sander (yellow card) 24'; Hayner (yellow card) 58'; André (yellow card) 60'; Marcão (yellow card) 85'	Report	4' Patrick; (yellow card) 61' Yuri Alberto	Stadium: Ilha do Retiro; Attendance: 0 Referee: André Castro

19 September 2021 21	Internacional	1–0	Fortaleza	Porto Alegre
11:00	Rodrigo Dourado (yellow card) 59'; Bruno Méndez (yellow card) 59'; Renzo Saravia (red card) 72'; Edenílson 90+3'	Report	(yellow card) 48' Marcelo Benevenuto; (red card) 72' David	Stadium: Beira-Rio; Attendance: 0 Referee: Edina Alves Batista

26 September 2021 22	Internacional	2–0	Bahia	Porto Alegre
16:00	Heitor (yellow card) 27'; Yuri Alberto 39'; Rodrigo Dourado 74'; Víctor Cuesta (yellow card) 90'	Report	(yellow card) 19' Lucas Mugni; (yellow card) 37' Gilberto	Stadium: Beira-Rio; Attendance: 0 Referee: Bruno Arleu de Araújo

2 October 2021 23	Atlético Mineiro	1–0	Internacional	Belo Horizonte
21:00	Matías Zaracho (yellow card) 27'; Nacho Fernández (yellow card) 52'; Guilherme Arana (yellow card) 60'; Keno 79'; Júnior Alonso (yellow card) 90+4'	Report	(yellow card) 43' Rodrigo Dourado; (yellow card) 88' Víctor Cuesta	Stadium: Mineirão; Attendance: 7,166; Referee: Luiz Flávio de Oliveira

6 October 2021 24	Ceará	0–0	Internacional	Fortaleza
19:00	Bruno Pacheco (yellow card) 24'; Luiz Otávio (yellow card) 41'; Vina (yellow card) 69'; Marlon (yellow card) 82'; Igor (yellow card) 90+2'	Report	(yellow card) 27' Moisés; (yellow card) 55' Renzo Saravia	Stadium: Arena Castelão; Referee: Rodolpho Toski Marques

9 October 2021 25	Internacional	5–2	Chapecoense	Porto Alegre
11:00	Yuri Alberto 2', 36', 40'; Taison 6'; Daniel (yellow card) 16'; Matheus Cadorini 58', (yellow card) 70'; Moisés (yellow card) 90'	Report	61', 62' Mike; (yellow card) 65' Jordan	Stadium: Estádio Beira-Rio; Attendance: 8,506; Referee: Alisson Furtado

13 October 2021 26	Internacional	3–1	América Mineiro	Porto Alegre
21:30	Patrick 14', 64'; Yuri Alberto 90'; Paulo Victor (yellow card) 90+5'	Report	16' Ademir; (yellow card) 58' Felipe Azevedo; (yellow card) 69' Ribamar	Stadium: Estádio Beira-Rio; Attendance: 9,711; Referee: Caio Max Augusto Vieira

17 October 2021 27	Palmeiras	1–0	Internacional	São Paulo
16:00	Felipe Melo (yellow card) 14'; Raphael Veiga 52' (pen.); Rony (yellow card) 75'; Gustavo Scarpa (yellow card) 90+2'	Report	(yellow card) 16' Patrick; (yellow card) 37' Víctor Cuesta; (red card) 50' Edenílson; (yellow card) 54' Gabriel Mercado; (yellow card) 90+4'Heitor	Stadium: Allianz Parque; Attendance: 11,111; Referee: Bráulio da Silva Machado

21 October 2021 19	Internacional	1–1	Red Bull Bragantino	Porto Alegre
20:00	Maurício 39', (yellow card) 45'; Bruno Méndez (yellow card) 40'; Renzo Saravia (yellow card) 75'; Gabriel Boschilia (yellow card) 86'; Zé Gabriel (yellow card) 90+4'	Report	(yellow card) 45+2' Helinho; (yellow card) 90+1' Aderlan; 90+5' Bruno	Stadium: Estádio Beira-Rio; Attendance: 9,249; Referee: Maroelson Alves ouza

24 October 2021 28	Internacional	2–2	Corinthians	Porto Alegre
16:00	Rodrigo Lindoso 9'; Rodrigo Dourado (yellow card) 37'; Gabriel Mercado (yellow card) 45+1'; Taison (yellow card) 64'; Gustavo Maia 90+3'; Patrick (red card) 90+5'	Report	(yellow card) 26' Gabriel; 61' Giuliano; 67' (pen.) Fábio Santos; (yellow card) 88' Renato Augusto; (red card) 90+5' Xavier; (yellow card) 90+8' Cássio	Stadium: Estádio Beira-Rio; Attendance: 13,216; Referee: Bruno Arleu de Araújo

31 October 2021 29	São Paulo	1–0	Internacional	São Paulo
18:15	Gabriel Sara 5'	Report	(yellow card) 36' Víctor Cuesta; (yellow card) 78' Kaique Rocha	Stadium: Morumbi; Attendance: 19,867; Referee: André Castro

6 November 2021 30	Internacional	1–0	Grêmio	Porto Alegre
19:00	Renzo Saravia (yellow card) 24'; Taison 40'; Patrick (red card) 90+5'	Report	(yellow card) 22' Mathías Villasanti; (yellow card) 29' Pedro Geromel; (yellow card) 75' Thiago Santos; (red card) 90+5' Bruno Cortez	Stadium: Estádio Beira-Rio; Attendance: 25,971; Referee: Marcelo de Lima Henrique

10 November 2021 31	Juventude	2–1	Internacional	Caxias do Sul
21:30	William Matheus (yellow card) 43'; Dawhan 65'; Paulo Victor 86' (o.g.); Dawhan (yellow card) 90+2'	Report	(yellow card) 18' Gabriel Mercado; (yellow card) 69' Edenílson; 88' Matheus Cadorini; (yellow card) 90' Rodrigo Dourado; (yellow card) 90+2' Yuri Alberto	Stadium: Estádio Alfredo Jaconi; Referee: Bruno Arleu de Araújo

13 November 2021 32	Internacional	2–1	Athletico Paranaense	Porto Alegre
19:00	Bruno Méndez (yellow card) 24'; Edenílson 40', 65'; Rodrigo Lindoso (yellow card) 41'; Moisés (yellow card) 78'; Víctor Cuesta (yellow card) 79'; Maurício (yellow card) 84'; Rodrigo Dourado (yellow card) 90+2'	Report	(yellow card) 27' Marcinho; 37', (yellow card) 84' David Terans; (yellow card) 72' Thiago Heleno	Stadium: Estádio Beira-Rio; Attendance: 10,046; Referee: Ramon Abatti

17 November 2021 33	Cuiabá	1–0	Internacional	Cuiabá
19:00	Élton 69' (pen.), (yellow card) 70'; Clayson (yellow card) 79'; Yuri (yellow card) 89'; Anderson Conceição (yellow card) 90+1'	Report	(yellow card) 35' Paulo Victor	Stadium: Arena Pantanal; Referee: Paulo Roberto Alves Júnor

20 November 2021 34	Internacional	1–2	Flamengo	Porto Alegre
21:30	Bruno Méndez (yellow card) 19'; Taison 41'; Moisés (yellow card) 45+3'	Report	4', (yellow card) 45+3' Gabriel Barbosa; 11' Andreas Pereira	Stadium: Estádio Beira-Rio; Referee: Sávio Pereira Sampaio

24 November 2021 35	Fluminense	1–0	Internacional	Rio de Janeiro
21:30	Fred 4' (pen.); Marlon Xavier (yellow card) 23'; Wellington (yellow card) 56'; Yago Felipe (yellow card) 72'; Calegari (yellow card) 90'; Manoel (yellow card) 90+1'	Report	(yellow card) 54' Víctor Cuesta; (yellow card) 82' Rodrigo Dourado; (red card) 90+6' Paulo Victor; (yellow card) 90+6' Heitor; (yellow card) 90+8' Gabriel Mercado	Stadium: Maracanã; Attendance: 18,617; Referee: Felipe Fernandes de Lima

28 November 2021 36	Internacional	1–1	Santos	Porto Alegre
19:00	Johnny (yellow card) 36'; Luiz Felipe 45+1' (o.g.)	Report	47' Marcos Guilherme; (yellow card) 85' Sandry	Stadium: Estádio Beira-Rio; Referee: Bráulio da Silva Machado

6 December 2021 37	Internacional	1–2	Atlético Goianiense	Porto Alegre
20:00	Yuri Alberto 33'; Carlos Palacios (yellow card) 70'; Taison (yellow card) 89'; Rodrigo Dourado (yellow card) 90+3'	Report	45' Gabriel Baralhas; 45+2' Janderson; (yellow card) 55' Rickson; (yellow card) 89' Igor Cariús	Stadium: Estádio Beira-Rio; Attendance: 19,265; Referee: Flávio Rodrigues de Souza

9 December 2021 38	Red Bull Bragantino	1–0	Internacional	Bragança Paulista
21:30	Jadsom Silva (yellow card) 59'; Léo Ortiz (yellow card) 83'; Artur 90+2', (yellow card) 90+3'	Report	(yellow card) 43' Renzo Saravia; (yellow card) 45+3' Carlos Palacios; (yellow card) 45+6' Víctor Cuesta; (yellow card) 69' Yuri Alberto; (yellow card) 82' Moisés	Stadium: Nabi Abi Chedid; Attendance: 5,339; Referee: Bráulio da Silva Machado

=== Copa do Brasil ===
==== Third round ====
3 June 2021 First leg	Vitória	0–1	Internacional	Salvador
19:00 UTC−3	Guilherme Santos (yellow card) 33'; Soares (yellow card) 43'	Report	(yellow card) 31' Taison; 73' (pen.) Thiago Galhardo; (yellow card) 78' Lucas Ribeiro	Stadium: Barradão; Attendance: 0 Referee: Marcelo de Lima Henrique

10 June 2021 Second leg	Internacional	1–3 (2–3 agg.)	Vitória	Porto Alegre
21:30 UTC−3	Pedro Henrique (yellow card) 43' (yellow-red card) 51'; Johnny 78'; Gabriel Boschilia (yellow card) 90+2' (yellow-red card) 90+3'	Report	(yellow card) 31' Pablo Siles; (yellow card) 55', (goal) 70' Samuel; (yellow card) 74' Marcelo Alves; (yellow card) 80' João Cabral; 80' Dudu; 85' Guilherme Santos	Stadium: Beira-Rio; Attendance: 0 Referee: Felipe Fernandes de Lima
