= Léo Borges (footballer, born 2001) =

Brazilian footballer

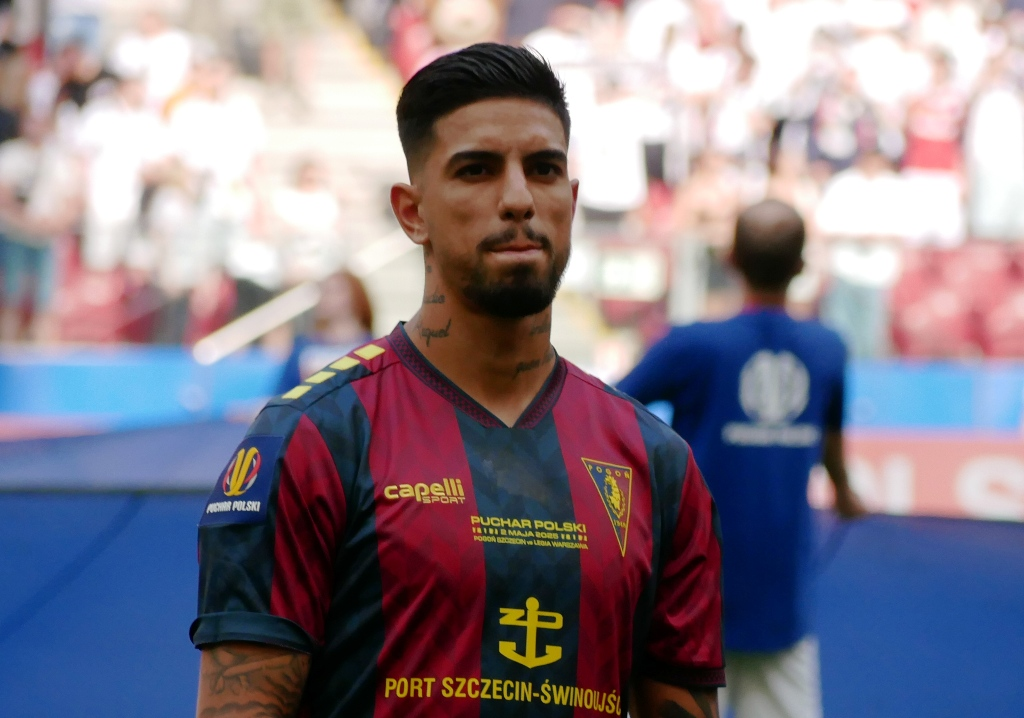
- Borges with Pogoń Szczecin in 2025

Personal information
- Full name: Leonardo Borges da Silva
- Date of birth: 3 January 2001 (age 25)
- Place of birth: Pelotas, Brazil
- Height: 1.79 m (5 ft 10 in)
- Position: Left-back

Team information
- Current team: Sigma Olomouc

Youth career
- 2017–2020: Internacional

Senior career*
Years	Team	Apps	(Gls)
2020–2022	Internacional	14	(0)
2021–2022	→ Porto B (loan)	19	(0)
2022–2026	Pogoń Szczecin	94	(3)
2022–2023	Pogoń Szczecin II	4	(0)
2026–	Sigma Olomouc	0	(0)
- * Club domestic league appearances and goals as of 13:33, 2 September 2026 (UTC)

Leonardo "Léo" Borges da Silva (born 3 January 2001) is a Brazilian professional footballer who plays as a left-back for Czech First League club Sigma Olomouc.

== Club career ==
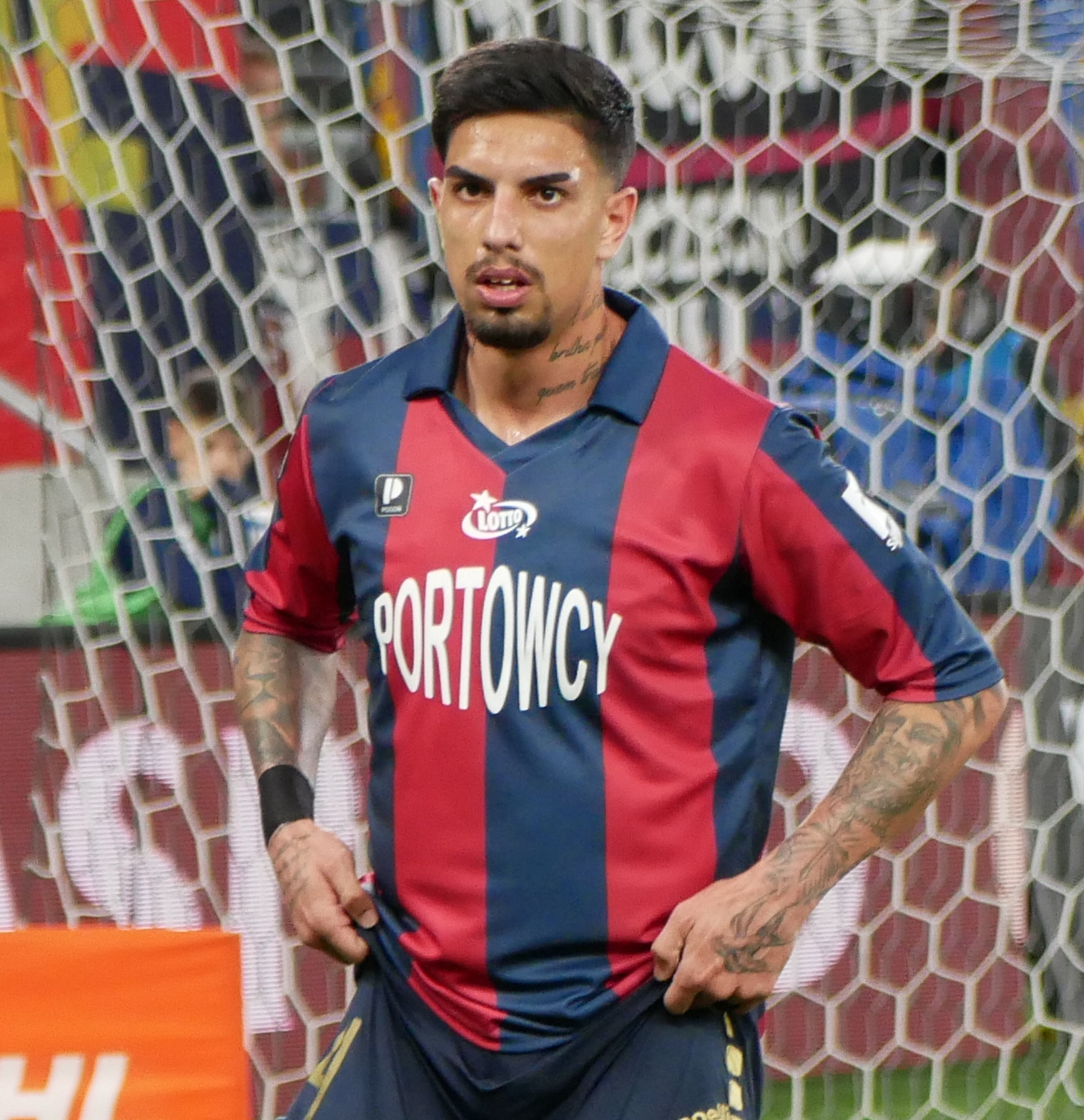
Borges playing for Pogoń Szczecin in 2023

Borges signed with Internacional in 2017. Borges made his professional debut with Internacional in a 0-0 Copa Libertadores tie with América de Cali on 30 September 2020.

On 3 August 2021, he joined Porto B in Portugal on a season-long loan.

On 10 July 2022, Polish side Pogoń Szczecin announced they had signed Borges on a three-year contract.

On 6 September 2026, Borges moved to Czech First League club Sigma Olomouc for an undisclosed fee.

== Career statistics ==
As of match played 29 August 2026

Appearances and goals by club, season and competition
Club	Season	League			State league		National cup (Note: Includes Copa do Brasil, Polish Cup)		Continental		Other		Total	
Club	Season	Division	Apps	Goals	Apps	Goals	Apps	Goals	Apps	Goals	Apps	Goals	Apps	Goals
Internacional	2020	Série A	1	0	0	0	0	0	1 (Note: Appearance(s) in Copa Libertadores)	0	—		2	0
Internacional	2021	Série A	5	0	8 (Note: Appearance(s) in Campeonato Gaúcho)	0	0	0	1	0	—		14	0
Internacional	2022	Série A	0	0	0	0	0	0	0	0	—		0	0
Internacional	Total		6	0	8	0	0	0	2	0	—		16	0
Porto B (loan)	2021–22	Liga Portugal 2	21	0	—		—		—		—		21	0
Pogoń Szczecin	2022–23	Ekstraklasa	15	0	—		2	0	0	0	—		17	0
Pogoń Szczecin	2023–24	Ekstraklasa	24	1	—		4	1	2 (Note: Appearance(s) in UEFA Europa Conference League)	0	—		30	2
Pogoń Szczecin	2024–25	Ekstraklasa	30	1	—		6	0	—		—		36	1
Pogoń Szczecin	2025–26	Ekstraklasa	20	0	—		1	0	—		—		21	0
Pogoń Szczecin	2026–27	Ekstraklasa	5	1	—		0	0	—		—		5	1
Pogoń Szczecin	Total		94	3	—		13	1	2	0	—		109	4
Pogoń Szczecin II	2022–23	III liga, group III	2	0	—		0	0	—		—		2	0
Pogoń Szczecin II	2023–24	III liga, group III	2	0	—		0	0	—		—		2	0
Pogoń Szczecin II	Total		4	0	—		0	0	—		—		4	0
Sigma Olomouc	2026–27	Czech First League	0	0	—		0	0	—		—		0	0
Career total			125	3	8	0	13	1	4	0	0	0	150	4
