= Lucas Ramos (footballer, born 2001) =

Brazilian footballer

Personal information
- Full name: Lucas de Ramos Silveira
- Date of birth: 3 January 2001 (age 25)
- Place of birth: Sarandi, Brazil
- Height: 1.73 m (5 ft 8 in)
- Position: Midfielder

Team information
- Current team: Ypiranga
- Number: 16

Youth career
- Internacional

Senior career*
Years	Team	Apps	(Gls)
2021–2025	Internacional	26	(1)
2024	→ Auda (loan)	25	(1)
2025–	Ypiranga	44	(2)
- * Club domestic league appearances and goals as of 10 November 2026

Lucas de Ramos Silveira (born 3 January 2001), known as Lucas Ramos, is a Brazilian professional footballer who plays as a midfielder for Ypiranga.

== Club career ==
Born in Sarandi, Rio Grande do Sul, Lucas Ramos was an Internacional youth graduate. On 24 November 2020, after being involved in first team trainings, he renewed his contract until 2024.

Lucas Ramos made his senior debut on 1 March 2021, starting in a 1–0 Campeonato Gaúcho home win over Juventude, as Internacional fielded an under-20 side to the match. Three days later he scored his first senior goal, netting his team's second in a 2–2 away draw against Pelotas.

On 10 March 2021, Lucas Ramos was definitely promoted to the main squad by manager Miguel Ángel Ramírez. He made his Série A debut on 20 June, starting in a 1–1 home draw against Ceará.

== Career statistics ==
As of 19 July 2022

Appearances and goals by club, season and competition
Club	Season	League			State League		National Cup		Continental		Other		Total	
Club	Season	Division	Apps	Goals	Apps	Goals	Apps	Goals	Apps	Goals	Apps	Goals	Apps	Goals
Internacional	2021	Série A	2	0	6	1	1	0	1 (Note: Appearance(s) in Copa Libertadores)	0	—		10	1
Internacional	2022	Série A	1	0	1	0	0	0	0	0	—		2	0
Career total			3	0	7	1	1	0	1	0	0	0	12	1
