= 2022 Sport Club Internacional season =

Internacional
2022 season
- President: Alessandro Barcellos
- Manager: (Uruguay) Alexander Medina (until April 15, 2022) (Brazil) Cauan de Almeida (interim) (Brazil) Mano Menezes (since April 20, 2022)
- Stadium: Estádio Beira-Rio
- Campeonato Brasileiro Série A: 2nd
- Campeonato Gaúcho: Semi-finals
- Copa Sudamericana: Quarter-finals
- Copa do Brasil: First round
- Top goalscorer: League: Alexandre Alemão (8); All: Edenílson, Alexandre Alemão (10)
- Highest home attendance: 43,191 vs Melgar on 11 Aug
- Lowest home attendance: 4,045 vs DIM on 17 May
- Average home league attendance: 21,734
- Biggest win: 5-1 vs 9 de Octubre, Copa Sudamericana (5/24)
- Biggest defeat: 0-3 vs Grêmio, Campeonato Gaúcho (3/19); 0-3 vs Fortaleza, Brasileirão (8/7)
Home colours	Away colours	Third colours

The 2022 season was Sport Club Internacional's 112th season in existence. As well as the Campeonato Brasileiro Série A, the club competed in the Copa do Brasil, the Campeonato Gaúcho and the Copa Sudamericana.

Internacional started the season under coach 'Cacique' Medina, but soon found itself in a bad situation after a sub-par performance in the Campeonato Gaúcho, being knocked out by rivals Gremio thanks to a 3–0 home defeat in the knockout round which the team was unable to turn around even after winning at the Arena do Grêmio in the 2nd leg.

Moreover, Inter managed to suffer one of the worst defeats of its history after being knocked out in the First Round of the Copa do Brasil to a 2–0 defeat to minnows Globo FC, pilling pressure on the team and Medina. The Uruguayan was sacked after a 1–1 draw at Beira-Rio vs Guaireña, prompting the hiring of veteran and Rio Grande do Sul-born Mano Menezes.

Under Menezes, the Colorado slowly managed to find consistency, also greatly after the signings of players like Wanderson, Carlos De Pena, Vitão, Renê, Gabriel, Pedro Henrique and Alan Patrick. Inter qualified to the Sudamericana quarterfinals, a campaign highlighted by a comeback vs Colo Colo with a big 4–1 win at Beira-Rio, but was eliminated on its home soil to Melgar on penalties.

Internacional soon piled good results in the Brasileirão and was constantly on the races for the top spot, but was unable to reach eventual champions Palmeiras and found themselves Serie A runner-ups once again, the fifth time it happened in the 21st century.

== First team ==
As of 13 November 2022

Note: Flags indicate national team as defined under FIFA eligibility rules; some limited exceptions apply. Players may hold more than one non-FIFA nationality.

No.	Pos.	Nation	Player
1	GK	BRA	Daniel
2	DF	BRA	Heitor
3	DF	BRA	Kaique Rocha (on loan from Sampdoria)
4	DF	BRA	Rodrigo Moledo
5	MF	BRA	Liziero (on loan from São Paulo)
6	DF	BRA	Paulo Victor
7	FW	BRA	Taison (captain)
8	MF	BRA	Edenílson (vice-captain)
9	FW	BRA	Wesley Moraes (on loan from Aston Villa)
10	MF	BRA	Alan Patrick
11	FW	BRA	Yuri Alberto (until 30 January)
11	FW	BRA	Wanderson (on loan from Krasnodar)
12	GK	BRA	Keiller
13	MF	BRA	Rodrigo Dourado (3rd captain)
14	FW	CHI	Carlos Palacios (until 11 April)
14	MF	URU	Carlos de Pena (on loan from Dynamo Kyiv)
15	DF	ARG	Victor Cuesta (until 12 April)
16	DF	ARG	Fabricio Bustos
17	FW	BRA	David
18	FW	BRA	Matheus Cadorini
19	MF	BRA	Rodrigo Lindoso

No.	Pos.	Nation	Player
20	DF	BRA	Moisés
21	MF	BRA	Gabriel Boschilia (until 12 August)
21	DF	BRA	Igor Gomes
22	DF	URU	Bruno Méndez (on loan from Corinthians until 30 Jun)
22	DF	BRA	Weverton
23	MF	BRA	Gabriel
24	GK	BRA	Anthoni
25	DF	ARG	Gabriel Mercado
26	MF	BRA	Estêvão
27	MF	BRA	Maurício
28	FW	BRA	Pedro Henrique
30	MF	USA	Johnny Cardoso
32	MF	BRA	Bruno Gomes (until 22 July)
32	FW	BRA	Mikael
33	DF	BRA	Renê
35	FW	BRA	Alexandre Alemão
36	DF	BRA	Thauan Lara
37	MF	BRA	Lucas Ramos
39	FW	BRA	Nicolas
40	DF	BRA	Tiago Barbosa
41	MF	BRA	Matheus Dias
44	DF	BRA	Vitão (on loan from Shakhtar Donetsk)
47	FW	BRA	Caio Vidal
52	GK	BRA	Emerson Júnior
77	FW	BRA	Gustavo Maia (on loan from Barcelona B)

=== Reserve squad ===
Note: Flags indicate national team as defined under FIFA eligibility rules; some limited exceptions apply. Players may hold more than one non-FIFA nationality.

No.	Pos.	Nation	Player
—	DF	BRA	Natanael

== Transfers ==
=== In ===
Date	Pos.	No.	Player	From	Fee	Ref.
1 January 2022	FW	14	(Chile) Carlos Palacios (Note: Palacios had a pre-agreed buyout deal in 2021)	(Chile) Unión Española	€2,700,000	
1 January 2022	FW	18	(Brazil) Matheus Cadorini	(Brazil) Osasco Audax	€160,000	
1 January 2022	DF	20	(Brazil) Moisés	(Brazil) Bahia	Undisclosed	
1 January 2022	GK	1	(Brazil) Keiller	(Brazil) Chapecoense	Return from Loan	-
8 January 2022	MF	10	(Argentina) Andrés D’Alessandro	(Uruguay) Nacional	Free	
19 January 2022	FW	17	(Brazil) David	(Brazil) Fortaleza	€1,750,000	
10 February 2022	MF	23	(Brazil) Gabriel	(Brazil) Corinthians	Free	
15 February 2022	MF	32	(Brazil) Bruno Gomes	(Brazil) Vasco da Gama	Part exchange	
23 February 2022	DF	16	(Argentina) Fabricio Bustos	(Argentina) Independiente	€1,250,000	
18 March 2022	FW	35	(Brazil) Alexandre Alemão	(Brazil) Avaí	Undisclosed	
11 April 2022	DF	33	(Brazil) Renê	(Brazil) Flamengo	Free	
12 April 2022	MF	10	(Brazil) Alan Patrick	(Ukraine) Shakhtar Donetsk	€3,600,000	
12 April 2022	FW	28	(Brazil) Pedro Henrique	(Turkey) Sivasspor	Free	
29 July 2022	FW	9	(Argentina) Braian Romero	(Argentina) River Plate	€900,000	
6 August 2022	DF	21	(Brazil) Igor Gomes	(Spain) Barcelona B	Free	

=== Out ===
Date	Pos.	No.	Player	To	Fee	Ref.
1 January 2022	FW	-	(Argentina) Leandro Fernández (Note: Played for Club Nacional in 2021)	Free Agent	End of Contract	-
1 January 2022	GK	-	(Brazil) Danilo Fernandes	(Brazil) Bahia	End of Contract	
1 January 2022	MF	-	(Brazil) Richard	(Brazil) CRB	Free	
1 January 2022	FW	-	(Brazil) Vinicius Mello	(United States) Charlotte FC	€1,700,000	
1 January 2022	GK	-	(Brazil) Marcelo Lomba	(Brazil) Palmeiras	End of Contract	
1 January 2022	DF	-	(Argentina) Renzo Saravia	(Portugal) FC Porto	End of Loan	
1 January 2022	MF	-	(Brazil) Ramon	(Brazil) Atlético Goianiense	Free	
1 January 2022	DF	-	(Brazil) Lucas Ribeiro	(Germany) Hoffenheim	End of Loan	
8 January 2022	MF	-	(Brazil) Patrick	(Brazil) São Paulo	€500,000	
11 January 2022	FW	-	(Brazil) Guilherme Pato	(Azerbaijan) Neftçi Peşəkar	Free	
11 January 2022	FW	-	(Colombia) Juan Manuel Cuesta	(Colombia) Independiente Medellín	End of Loan	
16 January 2022	DF	-	(Brazil) Vinícius Tobias	(Ukraine) Shakhtar Donetsk	€6,000,000	
30 January 2022	FW	11	(Brazil) Yuri Alberto	(Russia) Zenit	€25,800,000	
11 February 2022	MF	-	(Brazil) Zé Gabriel	(Brazil) Vasco da Gama	Part exchange	
18 April 2022	MF	10	(Argentina) Andrés D’Alessandro	Retired	-	
11 April 2022	FW	14	(Brazil) Carlos Palacios	(Brazil) Vasco da Gama	€1,500,000	
21 June 2022	DF	22	(Uruguay) Bruno Méndez	(Brazil) Corinthians	End of Loan	
1 July 2022	FW	23	(Brazil) Marcos Guilherme	(Brazil) São Paulo	Free	
7 July 2022	DF	-	(Brazil) Léo Borges	(Poland) Pogoń Szczecin	Free	
18 July 2022	DF	-	(Brazil) Natanael	(Brazil) Avaí	Free	
28 August 2022	DF	-	(Brazil) Pedro Henrique	(Bulgaria) Ludogorets Razgrad	€900,000	
2 September 2022	MF	-	(Brazil) Nonato	(Bulgaria) Ludogorets Razgrad	€1,700,000	

== Competitions ==
=== Overview ===
Competition	First match	Last match	Starting round	Final position	Record							
Competition	First match	Last match	Starting round	Final position	Pld	W	D	L	GF	GA	GD	Win %
Série A	10 April 2022	13 November 2022	Matchday 1	Runners-up	38	20	13	5	58	31	+27	52.63
Campeonato Gaúcho	26 January 2022	23 March 2022	Matchday 1	Semi-finals	13	6	4	3	14	13	+1	46.15
Copa do Brasil	3 March 2022		First round	First round	1	0	0	1	0	2	−2	0.00
Copa Sudamericana	6 April 2022	11 August 2022	Group stage	Quarter-finals	10	4	5	1	16	8	+8	40.00
Total					62	30	22	10	88	54	+34	48.39

Source: Competitions

=== Campeonato Gaúcho ===
==== League table ====
Pos	Team	Pld	W	D	L	GF	GA	GD	Pts	Qualification or relegation
1	Ypiranga-RS	11	6	3	2	17	8	+9	21	Qualification to Knockout stage
2	Grêmio	11	6	3	2	18	10	+8	21	Qualification to Knockout stage
3	Internacional	11	5	4	2	13	10	+3	19	Qualification to Knockout stage
4	Brasil (PE)	11	3	7	1	12	11	+1	16	Qualification to Knockout stage
5	Caxias	11	4	3	4	15	9	+6	15	

Updated to match(es) played on unknown. Source: Soccerway
Rules for classification: 1) Points; 2) Wins; 3) Goal difference; 4) Goals scored; 5) fewest red cards; 6) fewest yellow cards; 7) Draw in the headquarters of the FGF.

==== Matches ====
26 January 2022 1	Juventude	1–2	Internacional	Caxias do Sul
16:00	Ricardo Bueno 81' (pen.)	Report	Maurício 49'; Yuri Alberto 54'	Stadium: Estádio Alfredo Jaconi; Referee: Roger Goulart

29 January 2022 2	Internacional	2–0	União Frederiquense	Porto Alegre
19:00	Wesley 14' (pen.); D'Alessandro 84'	Report		Stadium: Beira-Rio; Referee: Bruno Alexandre da Silva Leites

2 February 2022 3	São Luiz	0–0	Internacional	Ijuí
19:00		Report		Stadium: Estádio 19 de Outubro; Referee: Anderson Daronco

5 February 2022 4	Ypiranga	3–1	Internacional	Erechim
16:30	Lorran 24'; Erick 51', 52'	Report	Bruno Méndez 45+2'	Stadium: Colosso da Lagoa; Referee: Wagner Silveira Echevarria

9 February 2022 5	Internacional	1–1	Novo Hamburgo	Porto Alegre
21:30	Taison 66'	Report	Michel 55'	Stadium: Beira-Rio; Referee: Érico Andrade de Carvalho

12 February 2022 6	Caxias	0–1	Internacional	Caxias do Sul
16:30		Report	Maurício 87'	Stadium: Estádio Centenário; Referee: Roger Goulart

16 February 2022 7	Internacional	1–1	Brasil de Pelotas	Porto Alegre
20:00	Taison 44'	Report	Paulo Victor 52'	Stadium: Beira-Rio; Referee: Rafael Rodrigo Klein

20 February 2022 8	São José	3–2	Internacional	Porto Alegre
20:30	Silas 52'; Kevin 63'; Cristiano 68'	Report	Edenílson 36'; Caio Vidal 87'	Stadium: Estádio Passo D'Areia; Referee: Jean Pierre Gonçalves Lima

6 March 2022 10	Internacional	1–0	Aimoré	Porto Alegre
18:15	David 33'	Report		Stadium: Beira-Rio; Referee: Anderson Daronco

9 March 2022 9	Internacional	1–0	Grêmio	Porto Alegre
19:00	David 45+2'	Report		Stadium: Beira-Rio; Referee: Leandro Vuaden
Note: The match was originally supposed to take place on 26 February at 19:00, but was postponed due to the fact that the Grêmio bus was stoned by Internacional fans.

12 March 2022 11	Guarany de Bagé	1–1	Internacional	Bagé
16:30	Marcos Paulo 20'	Report	Caio Vidal 82'	Stadium: Estádio Estrela D'Alva; Referee: Lucas Guimarães Rechatiko Horn

==== Knockout stage ====
===== Semi-finals =====
19 March 2022 First leg	Internacional	0–3	Grêmio	Porto Alegre
16:30		Report	Elias Manoel 11'; Bitello 23'; Diego Souza 72' (pen.)	Stadium: Beira-Rio; Referee: Jean Pierre Gonçalves Lima

23 March 2022 Second leg	Grêmio	0–1 (3–1 agg.)	Internacional	Porto Alegre
22:15		Report	Taison 64'	Stadium: Arena do Grêmio; Referee: Leandro Vuaden

=== Copa Sudamericana ===
Pos	Team	Pld	W	D	L	GF	GA	GD	Pts	Qualification	INT	GUA	DIM	9OC
1	(Brazil) Internacional	6	3	3	0	12	5	+7	12	Round of 16	—	1–1	2–0	5–1
2	(Paraguay) Guaireña	6	2	4	0	10	8	+2	10		1–1	—	3–3	1–0
3	(Colombia) Independiente Medellín	6	1	2	3	8	11	−3	5		0–1	1–1	—	2–1
4	(Ecuador) 9 de Octubre	6	1	1	4	9	15	−6	4		2–2	2–3	3–2	—

Source: CONMEBOL
Rules for classification: 1) Points; 2) Goal difference; 3) Goals scored; 4) Away goals scored; 5) CONMEBOL ranking.

6 April 2022 1	9 de Octubre (Ecuador)	2–2	(Brazil) Internacional	Manta, Ecuador
21:30 UTC−3	Da Luz 58', 75'	Report	Maurício 25'; Wesley 26'	Stadium: Estadio Jocay; Referee: Andrés Merlos (Argentina)

14 April 2022 2	Internacional (Brazil)	1–1	(Paraguay) Guaireña	Porto Alegre, Brazil
21:30 UTC−3	Paniagua 77' (o.g.)	Report	Otazú 41'	Stadium: Beira-Rio; Referee: Gery Vargas (Bolivia)

26 April 2022 3	Independiente Medellín (Colombia)	0–1	(Brazil) Internacional	Pereira, Colombia
21:30 UTC−3		Report	Alemão 54'	Stadium: Estadio Hernán Ramírez Villegas; Referee: Nicolás Lamolina (Argentina)

5 May 2022 4	Guaireña (Paraguay)	1–1	(Brazil) Internacional	Asunción, Paraguay
19:15 UTC−3	Otazú 33' (pen.)	Report	Wanderson 52'	Stadium: Estadio Defensores del Chaco; Referee: Cristian Garay (Chile)

17 May 2022 5	Internacional (Brazil)	2–0	(Colombia) Independiente Medellín	Porto Alegre, Brazil
19:15 UTC−3	Edenílson 19', 57'	Report		Stadium: Beira-Rio; Referee: Facundo Tello (Argentina)

24 May 2022 6	Internacional (Brazil)	5–1	(Ecuador) 9 de Octubre	Porto Alegre, Brazil
21:30 UTC−3	Dourado 9', 49', 75'; Quiñónez 66' (o.g.); Estêvão 83'	Report	Caicedo 11'	Stadium: Beira-Rio; Referee: Yael Falcón (Argentina)

==== Round of 16 ====
The draw for the round of 16 was held on 27 May 2022.

28 June 2022 First leg	Colo-Colo (Chile)	2–0	(Brazil) Internacional	Santiago, Chile
21:30 UTC−3	Lucero 12'; Solari 55'	Report		Stadium: Estadio Monumental David Arellano; Referee: Patricio Loustau (Argentina)

5 July 2022 Second leg	Internacional (Brazil)	4–1 (4–3 agg.)	(Chile) Colo-Colo	Porto Alegre, Brazil
21:30 UTC−3	Alan Patrick 29'; Edenílson 32'; Alemão 60'; Pedro Henrique 74'	Report	Costa 15' (pen.)	Stadium: Beira-Rio; Attendance: 40,598; Referee: Darío Herrera (Argentina)

==== Quarter-finals ====
4 August 2022 First leg	Melgar (Peru)	0–0	(Brazil) Internacional	Arequipa, Peru
19:15 UTC−3		Report		Stadium: Estadio Monumental de la UNSA; Referee: Andrés Matonte (Uruguay)

11 August 2022 Second leg	Internacional (Brazil)	0–0 (0–0 agg.) (1–3 p)	(Peru) Melgar	Porto Alegre, Brazil
19:15 UTC−3		Report		Stadium: Beira-Rio; Attendance: 43,191; Referee: Roberto Tobar (Chile)
	Penalties
	Edenílson (penalty missed); Taison (penalty missed); Carlos de Pena (penalty missed); Pedro Henrique (penalty scored)		(penalty scored) Cabrera; (penalty missed) Galeano; (penalty scored) Cuesta; (penalty scored) Iberico

=== Serie A ===
==== League table ====
Pos	Team	Pld	W	D	L	GF	GA	GD	Pts	Qualification or relegation
1	Palmeiras (C)	38	23	12	3	66	27	+39	81	Qualification for Copa Libertadores group stage (Note: Flamengo qualified for the Copa Libertadores group stage by winning the 2022 Copa Libertadores. Since they also won the 2022 Copa do Brasil, the berth awarded to the Copa do Brasil champions (Copa Libertadores group stage) was passed over to the league's best placed team not already qualified.)
2	Internacional	38	20	13	5	58	31	+27	73	Qualification for Copa Libertadores group stage
3	Fluminense	38	21	7	10	63	41	+22	70	Qualification for Copa Libertadores group stage
4	Corinthians	38	18	11	9	44	36	+8	65	Qualification for Copa Libertadores group stage
5	Flamengo	38	18	8	12	60	39	+21	62	Qualification for Copa Libertadores group stage

Source: CBF
Rules for classification: 1) points; 2) wins; 3) goal difference; 4) goals scored; 5) head-to-head results (only between two teams); 6) fewest red cards; 7) fewest yellow cards; 8) drawing of lots.
(C) Champions

==== Results summary ====
Overall								Home						Away					
Pld	W	D	L	GF	GA	GD	Pts	W	D	L	GF	GA	GD	W	D	L	GF	GA	GD
38	20	13	5	58	31	+27	73	13	5	1	40	14	+26	7	8	4	18	17	+1

==== Results by round ====
Round	1	2	3	4	5	6	7	8	9	10	11	12	13	14	15	16	17	18	19	20	21	22	23	24	25	26	27	28	29	30	31	32	33	34	35	36	37	38
Ground	A	H	A	H	A	H	A	H	A	A	H	A	H	H	A	H	A	H	A	H	A	H	A	H	A	H	A	H	H	A	H	A	A	H	A	H	A	H
Result	L	W	W	D	D	D	D	D	W	D	W	W	L	W	D	W	D	D	L	W	L	W	W	W	D	W	W	D	W	D	W	W	D	W	L	W	W	W
Position	18	13	5	8	9	11	11	12	7	7	4	3	5	4	5	3	4	6	7	6	6	6	5	5	4	2	2	3	2	2	2	2	2	2	2	2	2	2

Postponed

Source: CBF.com

==== Matches ====
The league fixtures were announced on 2 February 2022.

10 April 2022 1	Atlético Mineiro	2–0	Internacional	Belo Horizonte
16:00	Hulk 10', 90+3'	Report		Stadium: Mineirão; Attendance: 37,531; Referee: Bruno Arleu de Araújo

17 April 2022 2	Internacional	2–1	Fortaleza	Porto Alegre
18:00	D'Alessandro 45+7'; Alemão 90'	Report	Yago Pikachu 45+6' (pen.)	Stadium: Estádio Beira-Rio; Referee: Flávio Rodrigues de Souza

23 April 2022 3	Fluminense	0–1	Internacional	Rio de Janeiro
19:00		Report	Alemão 54'	Stadium: Maracanã; Attendance: 16,176; Referee: Bráulio da Silva Machado

1 May 2022 4	Internacional	0–0	Avaí	Porto Alegre
19:00		Report		Stadium: Estádio Beira-Rio; Referee: Wilton Pereira Sampaio

8 May 2022 5	Juventude	1–1	Internacional	Caxias do Sul
19:00	Óscar Ruiz 90+3'	Report	Vitão 47'	Stadium: Estádio Alfredo Jaconi; Referee: Bruno Arleu de Araújo

14 May 2022 6	Internacional	2–2	Corinthains	Porto Alegre
19:00	Alan Patrick 25'; Wanderson 44'	Report	Raul Gustavo 30'; Jô 64'	Stadium: Estádio Beira-Rio; Attendance: 17,506; Referee: Bráulio da Silva Machado

21 May 2022 7	Cuiabá	1–1	Internacional	Cuiabá
21:00	Valdívia 50'	Report	Carlos de Pena 83' (pen.)	Stadium: Arena Pantanal; Referee: Ramon Abatti Abel

30 May 2022 8	Internacional	1–1	Atlético Goianiense	Porto Alegre
20:00	Wanderson 12'	Report	Churín 79'	Stadium: Estádio Beira-Rio; Attendance: 11,050; Referee: Marcelo de Lima Henrique

5 June 2022 9	Red Bull Bragantino	0–2	Internacional	Bragança Paulista
19:00		Report	Johnny Cardoso 90+2'; Carlos de Pena 90+10'	Stadium: Estádio Nabi Abi Chedid; Attendance: 3,052; Referee: Wagner do Nascimento Magalhães

8 June 2022 10	Santos	1–1	Internacional	Santos
21:30	Lucas Braga 63'	Report	Bruno Méndez 71'	Stadium: Vila Belmiro; Attendance: 8,845; Referee: Ramon Abatti Abel

11 June 2022 11	Internacional	3–1	Flamengo	Porto Alegre
21:00	Wanderson 1', 22'; Pedro Henrique 90+2' (pen.)	Report	Andreas Pereira 58'	Stadium: Estádio Beira-Rio; Attendance: 22,392; Referee: Bráulio da Silva Machado

15 June 2022 12	Goiás	1–2	Internacional	Goiânia
20:30	Da Silva 41'	Report	Edenílson 8'; Alan Patrick 47'	Stadium: Estádio da Serrinha; Referee: Caio Max Augusto Vieira

19 June 2022 13	Internacional	2–3	Botafogo	Porto Alegre
18:00	Edenílson 9' (pen.); Bustos 14'	Report	Vinícius Lopes 19'; Erison 59'; Hugo 90+11'	Stadium: Estádio Beira-Rio; Attendance: 26,219; Referee: Sávio Pereira Sampaio

24 June 2022 14	Internacional	3–0	Coritiba	Porto Alegre
21:30	Taison 19'; Edenílson 42'; Alemão 54'	Report		Stadium: Estádio Beira-Rio; Attendance: 13,454; Referee: Jefferson Ferreira de Moraes

2 July 2022 15	Ceará	1–1	Internacional	Fortaleza
19:00	Lima 19' (pen.)	Report	Moisés 23'	Stadium: Arena Castelão; Attendance: 23,283; Referee: Rodolpho Toski Marques

11 July 2022 16	Internacional	1–0	América Mineiro	Porto Alegre
20:00	Moisés 90+5'	Report		Stadium: Estádio Beira-Rio; Attendance: 19,023; Referee: Flávio Rodrigues de Souza

16 July 2022 17	Athletico Paranaense	0–0	Internacional	Curitiba
16:30		Report		Stadium: Arena da Baixada; Attendance: 22,515; Referee: Ramon Abatti Abel

20 July 2022 18	Internacional	3–3	São Paulo	Porto Alegre
20:30	Pedro Henrique 4', 25'; Edenílson 41' (pen.); Rodrigo Moledo 62'	Report	Nikão 4', 30'; Luciano 54'	Stadium: Estádio Beira-Rio; Attendance: 32,804; Referee: Marcelo de Lima Henrique

24 July 2022 19	Palmeiras	2–1	Internacional	São Paulo
16:00	Gustavo Gómez 18'; Gabriel Menino 88'	Report	Alemão 82'	Stadium: Allianz Parque; Attendance: 38,658; Referee: Bruno Arleu de Araújo

31 July 2022 20	Internacional	3–0	Atlético Mineiro	Porto Alegre
16:00	Maurício 7', 30'; Wanderson 24'	Report		Stadium: Estádio Beira-Rio; Attendance: 39,451; Referee: Flávio Rodrigues de Souza

7 August 2022 21	Fortaleza	3–0	Internacional	Fortaleza
18:00	Lucas Crispim 45'; Hércules 70'; Robson 84'	Report		Stadium: Arena Castelão; Attendance: 39,253; Referee: Wagner do Nascimento Magalhães

14 August 2022 22	Internacional	3–0	Fluminense	Porto Alegre
19:00	Fabricio Bustos 36'; Alemão 71'; Carlos de Pena 90+3'	Report		Stadium: Estádio Beira-Rio; Attendance: 14,824; Referee: Ramon Abatti Abel

22 August 2022 23	Avaí	0–1	Internacional	Florianópolis
20:00		Report	Pedro Henrique 90+8' (pen.)	Stadium: Estádio da Ressacada; Attendance: 13,911; Referee: Edina Alves Batista

29 August 2022 24	Internacional	4–0	Juventude	Porto Alegre
20:00	Johnny Cardoso 38', 48'; Wanderson 45+8'; Edenílson 90+2' (pen.)	Report		Stadium: Estádio Beira-Rio; Attendance: 16,518; Referee: Bruno Arleu de Araújo

4 September 2022 25	Corinthians	2–2	Internacional	São Paulo
16:00	Balbuena 13'; Yuri Alberto 19'	Report	Alemão 1'; Alan Patrick 67'	Stadium: Neo Química Arena; Attendance: 41,748; Referee: Bráulio da Silva Machado

10 September 2022 26	Internacional	1–0	Cuiabá	Porto Alegre
16:30	Alemão 68'	Report		Stadium: Estádio Beira-Rio; Attendance: 30,719; Referee: Maguielson Lima Barbosa

19 September 2022 27	Atlético Goianiense	1–2	Internacional	Goiânia
20:00	Churín 64'	Report	Pedro Henrique 28', 35'	Stadium: Estádio Antônio Accioly; Referee: Edina Alves Batista

28 September 2022 28	Internacional	0–0	Red Bull Bragantino	Porto Alegre
21:45		Report		Stadium: Estádio Beira-Rio; Attendance: 17,943; Referee: Wagner do Nascimento Magalhães

1 October 2022 29	Internacional	1–0	Santos	Porto Alegre
15:00	Carlos de Pena 23'	Report		Stadium: Estádio Beira-Rio; Attendance: 30,858; Referee: Ramon Abatti Abel

5 October 2022 30	Flamengo	0–0	Internacional	Rio de Janeiro
21:30		Report		Stadium: Maracanã; Attendance: 43,710; Referee: Flávio Rodrigues de Souza

9 October 2022 31	Internacional	4–2	Goiás	Porto Alegre
11:00	Maurício 13'; Alan Patrick 42', 57'; Carlos de Pena 90+6'	Report	Pedro Raul 33' (pen.), 45+3'	Stadium: Estádio Beira-Rio; Attendance: 31,554; Referee: Edina Alves Batista

16 October 2022 32	Botafogo	0–1	Internacional	Rio de Janeiro
18:00		Report	Braian Romero 67'	Stadium: Estádio Nilton Santos; Attendance: 24,445; Referee: Bráulio da Silva Machado

23 October 2022 33	Coritiba	1–1	Internacional	Curitiba
18:00	Luciano Castán 24'	Report	Vitão 60'	Stadium: Estádio Couto Pereira; Attendance: 18,485; Referee: Wagner do Nascimento Magalhães

26 October 2022 34	Internacional	2–1	Ceará	Porto Alegre
21:45	Edenílson 65'; Alan Patrick 78' (pen.)	Report	Lima 6' (pen.)	Stadium: Estádio Beira-Rio; Attendance: 10,544; Referee: Ramon Abatti Abel

2 November 2022 35	América Mineiro	1–0	Internacional	Belo Horizonte
16:00	Alê 76'	Report		Stadium: Estádio Independência; Referee: Bruno Arleu de Araújo

5 November 2022 36	Internacional	2–0	Athletico Paranaense	Porto Alegre
21:00	Pedro Henrique 63'; Maurício 67'	Report		Stadium: Estádio Beira-Rio; Attendance: 11,006; Referee: Flávio Rodrigues de Souza

8 November 2022 37	São Paulo	0–1	Internacional	São Paulo
21:30		Report	Maurício 21'	Stadium: Morumbi; Attendance: 19,962; Referee: Wagner do Nascimento Magalhães

13 November 2022 38	Internacional	3–0	Palmeiras	Porto Alegre
16:00	Maurício 10'; Alemão 39'; Braian Romero 85'	Report		Stadium: Estádio Beira-Rio; Attendance: 31,632; Referee: Bruno Arleu de Araújo

=== Copa do Brasil ===
==== First round ====
3 March 2022 Single match	Globo	2–0	Internacional	Ceará-Mirim
21:30 UTC−3	Fernando Ceará 55'; Rômulo 88'	Report		Stadium: Barretão; Referee: Denis da Silva Ribeiro Serafim

== Statistics ==
Player with no appearances not included on list. Matches played as a sub in parentheses.

* Denotes a player that did not end the season at the club // ** Retired from football

As of As of 13 November 2022

=== Goalscorers ===
No.	Pos.	Nat.	Player	Brasileirão		Copa do Brasil		Sudamericana		Campeonato Gaúcho		Total	
No.	Pos.	Nat.	Player	P	G	P	G	P	G	P	G	P	G
1	GK	(Brazil)	Daniel	23	0	1	0	10	0	12	0	46	0
12	GK	(Brazil)	Keiller	15	0	0	0	0	0	1	0	16	0
2	DF	(Brazil)	Heitor *	5(1)	0	0	0	3(2)	0	7(1)	0	15(4)	0
16	DF	(Argentina)	Fabricio Bustos	31	2	1	0	9	0	5	0	46	2
22	DF	(Brazil)	Weverton	1(1)	0	0	0	0	0	0	0	1(1)	0
25	DF	(Argentina)	Gabriel Mercado	26(3)	0	0	0	8(1)	0	3(1)	0	37(5)	0
3	DF	(Brazil)	Kaique Rocha	7(2)	0	1(1)	0	2(1)	0	10(1)	0	20(5)	0
4	DF	(Brazil)	Rodrigo Moledo	20(6)	0	0	0	3(3)	0	0	0	23(9)	0
15	DF	(Argentina)	Victor Cuesta *	0	0	1	0	0	0	11	0	12	0
21	DF	(Brazil)	Igor Gomes *	3(1)	0	0	0	0	0	0	0	3(1)	0
22	DF	(Uruguay)	Bruno Méndez *	6(2)	1	1	0	6	0	8(2)	1	21(4)	2
44	DF	(Brazil)	Vitão	31	2	0	0	7	0	0	0	38	2
6	DF	(Brazil)	Paulo Victor *	0	0	0	0	0	0	8(2)	0	8(2)	0
20	DF	(Brazil)	Moisés *	8(1)	2	1	0	3(2)	0	7(1)	0	19(4)	0
33	DF	(Brazil)	Renê	28(1)	0	0	0	7	0	0	0	35(1)	0
36	DF	(Brazil)	Thauan Lara	7(3)	0	0	0	0	0	0	0	7(3)	0
10	MF	(Argentina)	Andrés D'Alessandro **	1	1	1(1)	0	1(1)	0	9(7)	1	12(9)	2
41	MF	(Brazil)	Matheus Dias	2(1)	0	0	0	0	0	1(1)	0	3(2)	0
13	MF	(Brazil)	Rodrigo Dourado *	8(3)	0	1(1)	0	5(2)	3	6(1)	0	20(7)	3
19	MF	(Brazil)	Rodrigo Lindoso *	0	0	0	0	0	0	3(2)	0	3(2)	0
23	MF	(Brazil)	Gabriel	26(2)	0	1	0	9(1)	0	7(1)	0	43(4)	0
32	MF	(Brazil)	Bruno Gomes *	0	0	0	0	0	0	1(1)	0	1(1)	0
10	MF	(Brazil)	Alan Patrick	26(6)	6	0	0	4(1)	1	0	0	30(7)	7
21	MF	(Brazil)	Boschilia *	4(4)	0	0	0	0	0	8(4)	0	12(8)	0
26	MF	(Brazil)	Estêvão	8(8)	0	0	0	4(4)	1	0	0	12(12)	1
27	MF	(Brazil)	Maurício	32(13)	6	1	0	9(3)	1	13(5)	2	55(21)	9
5	MF	(Brazil)	Liziero	14(9)	0	0	0	5(3)	0	9(2)	0	28(14)	0
8	MF	(Brazil)	Edenílson	31(7)	6	1	0	10	3	12(1)	1	54(8)	10
30	MF	(United States)	Johnny Cardoso	24(7)	3	1	0	4(3)	0	10(5)	0	39(15)	3
37	MF	(Brazil)	Lucas Ramos	9(9)	0	0	0	0	0	1(1)	0	10(10)	0
18	FW	(Brazil)	Matheus Cadorini *	3(2)	0	1(1)	0	1(1)	0	6(3)	0	11(7)	0
11	FW	(Brazil)	Wanderson	26(5)	6	0	0	6	1	0	0	32(5)	7
11	FW	(Brazil)	Yuri Alberto *	0	0	0	0	0	0	1	1	1	1
14	FW	(Chile)	Carlos Palacios *	0	0	0	0	0	0	1(1)	0	1(1)	0
14	FW	(Uruguay)	Carlos De Pena	34(4)	5	0	0	9(1)	0	0	0	43(5)	5
28	FW	(Brazil)	Pedro Henrique	32(16)	7	0	0	4(2)	1	0	0	36(18)	8
35	FW	(Brazil)	Alexandre Alemão	34(12)	8	0	0	8(3)	2	0	0	42(15)	10
47	FW	(Brazil)	Caio Vidal *	7(6)	0	1(1)	0	3(3)	0	10(8)	2	21(18)	2
9	FW	(Brazil)	Wesley Moraes *	8(4)	0	1	0	3(1)	1	9(4)	1	21(9)	2
9	FW	(Argentina)	Braian Romero	17(15)	2	0	0	1	0	0	0	18(15)	2
32	FW	(Brazil)	Mikael	0	0	0	0	1(1)	0	0	0	1(1)	0
77	FW	(Brazil)	Gustavo Maia	1(1)	0	0	0	0	0	3(2)	0	4(3)	0
7	FW	(Brazil)	Taison	20(15)	1	0	0	5(3)	0	9	3	34(18)	4
17	FW	(Brazil)	David	21(11)	0	1	0	6(4)	0	11(2)	0	39(17)	2
39	FW	(Brazil)	Nicolas *	0	0	0	0	0	0	1(1)	0	1(1)	0

=== Assists ===
Rank	No.	Pos.	Nat.	Player	Brasileirão	Copa do Brasil	Sudamericana	Campeonato Gaúcho	Total
1	14	FW	(Uruguay)	Carlos De Pena	6	0	1	0	7
2	16	DF	(Argentina)	Fabricio Bustos	3	0	2	1	6
3	27	MF	(Brazil)	Maurício	5	0	0	0	5
3	35	FW	(Brazil)	Alexandre Alemão	5	0	0	0	5
3	8	MF	(Brazil)	Edenílson	3	0	1	1	5
6	10	MF	(Brazil)	Alan Patrick	4	0	0	0	4
6	7	FW	(Brazil)	Taison	1	0	3	0	4
8	28	FW	(Brazil)	Pedro Henrique	3	0	0	0	3
8	11	FW	(Brazil)	Wanderson	3	0	0	0	3
8	21	MF	(Brazil)	Boschilia *	1	0	0	2	3
11	30	MF	(United States)	Johnny Cardoso	2	0	0	0	2
11	33	DF	(Brazil)	Renê	1	0	1	0	2
11	17	FW	(Brazil)	David	2	0	0	0	2
14	2	DF	(Brazil)	Heitor *	0	0	0	1	1
14	15	DF	(Argentina)	Victor Cuesta *	0	0	0	1	1
14	6	DF	(Brazil)	Paulo Victor *	0	0	0	1	1
14	20	DF	(Brazil)	Moisés *	1	0	0	0	1
14	13	MF	(Brazil)	Rodrigo Dourado *	0	0	1	0	1
14	18	FW	(Brazil)	Matheus Cadorini *	0	0	0	1	1
