= Heitor (footballer, born November 2000) =

Brazilian footballer

Personal information
- Full name: Heitor Rodrigues da Fonseca
- Date of birth: 5 November 2000 (age 26)
- Place of birth: Morro Redondo, Brazil
- Height: 1.74 m (5 ft 9 in)
- Position: Right back

Team information
- Current team: Chapecoense
- Number: 5

Youth career
- Progresso
- 2017–2019: Internacional

Senior career*
| Years | Team | Apps | (Gls) |
| 2019–2024 | Internacional | 90 | (2) |
| 2022 | → Cercle Brugge (loan) | 7 | (0) |
| 2023 | → Ferroviária (loan) | 10 | (1) |
| 2023 | → Mirassol (loan) | 9 | (0) |
| 2024–2025 | Guarani | 33 | (1) |
| 2025–2026 | Portimonense | 36 | (0) |
| 2026– | Chapecoense | 0 | (0) |
- * Club domestic league appearances and goals as of 20 June 2026

Heitor Rodrigues da Fonseca (born 5 November 2000), simply known as Heitor, is a Brazilian professional footballer who plays as right back for Chapecoense.

== Career ==
=== Internacional ===
Born in Morro Redondo, Rio Grande do Sul, Heitor joined Internacional's youth categories in 2017, from hometown side Progresso FC. On 3 April 2019, after impressing with the under-20 side in the Copa São Paulo de Futebol Júnior, he renewed his contract with the club. He made his first team – and Série A – debut on 14 July, starting in a 1–0 away loss against Athletico Paranaense.

On 10 December 2019, after finishing the year as a first-choice, Heitor renewed his contract with Inter until December 2022. He scored his first senior goal on 8 February 2020, netting the opener in a 2–0 Campeonato Gaúcho home win over Novo Hamburgo, but subsequently lost his starting spot during the campaign, after the arrivals of Renzo Saravia and Rodinei.

Heitor returned to starting spot in 2021, after Rodinei left and Saravia suffered a knee injury. On 10 March of that year, he was elected one of the 11 best under-20 players on South America for 2020 by IFFHS.

On 18 January 2022, Heitor renewed his contract with Internacional for a further year. On 22 June, despite losing his starting spot to Fabricio Bustos, he further extended his link for another six months.

==== Loan to Cercle Brugge ====
On 23 July 2022, Heitor joined Cercle Brugge in Belgium on loan, with an option to buy. He made his debut abroad on 7 August, coming on as a second-half substitute for Robbe Decostere in a 2–0 away loss against Standard Liège, but only featured in six more matches (all as a substitute) before leaving.

==== Loan to Ferroviária ====
On 29 December 2022, Heitor was announced at Ferroviária on loan for the 2023 Campeonato Paulista. A starter in the competition, he scored once in ten appearances as AFE suffered relegation.

==== Loan to Mirassol ====
On 4 April 2023, Heitor moved to Série B side Mirassol also in a temporary deal.

==== Guarani ====
Heitor made his league debut against São Bernardo on 25 January 2024. He scored his first league goal against Ituano on 19 June 2024, scoring in the 89th minute.

== Career statistics ==
As of match played 20 December 2025

| Club | Season | League | | | State league | | National cup (Note: Includes Copa do Brasil, Belgian Cup and Taça de Portugal) | | Continental | | Other | | Total | |
| Club | Season | Division | Apps | Goals | Apps | Goals | Apps | Goals | Apps | Goals | Apps | Goals | Apps | Goals |
|---|---|---|---|---|---|---|---|---|---|---|---|---|---|---|
| Internacional | 2019 | Série A | 20 | 0 | 0 | 0 | 0 | 0 | 0 | 0 | — | | 20 | 0 |
| Internacional | 2020 | Série A | 12 | 0 | 4 (Note: Appearance(s) in Campeonato Gaúcho) | 1 | 1 | 0 | 2 (Note: Appearance(s) in Copa Libertadores) | 0 | — | | 19 | 1 |
| Internacional | 2021 | Série A | 24 | 0 | 8 | 1 | 0 | 0 | 4 | 0 | — | | 36 | 1 |
| Internacional | 2022 | Série A | 5 | 0 | 7 | 0 | 0 | 0 | 3 (Note: Appearance(s) in Copa Sudamericana) | 0 | — | | 15 | 0 |
| Internacional | 2023 | Série A | 0 | 0 | 0 | 0 | 0 | 0 | 0 | 0 | — | | 0 | 0 |
| Internacional | Total | | 61 | 0 | 19 | 2 | 1 | 0 | 9 | 0 | — | | 90 | 2 |
| Cercle Brugge (loan) | 2022–23 | Belgian Pro League | 7 | 0 | — | | 0 | 0 | — | | — | | 7 | 0 |
| Ferroviária (loan) | 2023 | Série D | — | | 10 (Note: Appearance(s) in Campeonato Paulista) | 1 | — | | — | | — | | 10 | 1 |
| Mirassol (loan) | 2023 | Série B | 9 | 0 | 0 | 0 | 0 | 0 | — | | — | | 9 | 0 |
| Guarani | 2024 | Série B | 24 | 1 | 9 | 0 | — | | — | | — | | 33 | 1 |
| Portimonense | 2024–25 | Liga Portugal 2 | 17 | 0 | — | | 0 | 0 | — | | 0 | 0 | 17 | 0 |
| Portimonense | 2025–26 | Liga Portugal 2 | 15 | 0 | — | | 1 | 0 | — | | 0 | 0 | 16 | 0 |
| Portimonense | Total | | 32 | 0 | — | | 1 | 0 | — | | 0 | 0 | 33 | 0 |
| Career total | | | 133 | 1 | 38 | 3 | 2 | 0 | 9 | 0 | 0 | 0 | 182 | 4 |
