= Matheus Cadorini =

Brazilian footballer

Personal information
- Full name: Matheus Alfredo Cadorini da Silva
- Date of birth: 1 September 2002 (age 24)
- Place of birth: Taubaté, Brazil
- Height: 1.92 m (6 ft 4 in)
- Position: Forward

Team information
- Current team: Portuguesa
- Number: 9

Youth career
- 2017–2021: Audax
- 2020–2021: → Internacional (loan)

Senior career*
Years	Team	Apps	(Gls)
2018–2021	Audax	7	(0)
2021	→ Internacional (loan)	9	(2)
2021–2024	Internacional	10	(0)
2022–2023	→ Coritiba (loan)	11	(2)
2023–2024	→ Ituano (loan)	23	(4)
2024–2025	Murcia	16	(3)
2026–	Portuguesa	19	(9)
2026	→ Santa Cruz (loan)	5	(0)
- * Club domestic league appearances and goals as of 19:05, 13 October 2026 (UTC)

Matheus Alfredo Cadorini da Silva (born 1 September 2002), known as Matheus Cadorini, is a Brazilian footballer who plays as a forward for Portuguesa.

== Club career ==
Born in Taubaté, São Paulo, Cadorini was an Audax youth graduate. He made his senior debut on 19 September 2018, coming on as a second-half substitute in a 1–2 home loss against Ituano, for the year's Copa Paulista.

On 10 October 2020, Cadorini moved to Internacional on loan until December 2021, being initially assigned to the under-20s. He first appeared with the main squad on 1 March 2021, replacing Vinicius Mello in a 1–0 Campeonato Gaúcho home win over Juventude, as the club fielded a younger squad.

On his Série A debut on 10 October 2021, Cadorini replaced Yuri Alberto at half-time and scored his team's fifth in a 5–2 home routing of Chapecoense. On 3 December, he signed a permanent contract with Inter until 2025.

On 12 August 2022, Cadorini was announced on loan at fellow top tier side Coritiba. On 12 July 2023, after being rarely used, he moved to Ituano also in a temporary deal.

In August 2024, Cadorini was released from Internacional and signed permanently with Real Murcia for three years. On 11 December 2025, he returned to his home country after signing a three-year contract with Portuguesa.

== Career statistics ==
As of 13 October 2026

Club	Season	League			State League		Cup		Continental		Other		Total	
Club	Season	Division	Apps	Goals	Apps	Goals	Apps	Goals	Apps	Goals	Apps	Goals	Apps	Goals
Audax	2018	Paulista A2	—		0	0	—		—		1 (Note: Appearance(s) in Copa Paulista)	0	1	0
Audax	2019	Paulista A3	—		0	0	—		—		0	0	0	0
Audax	2020	Paulista A2	—		7	0	—		—		—		7	0
Audax	Total		—		7	0	—		—		1	0	8	0
Internacional	2021	Série A	8	2	2	0	0	0	0	0	—		10	2
Internacional	2022	Série A	3	0	6	0	1	0	1 (Note: Appearance(s) in Copa Sudamericana)	0	—		11	0
Internacional	Total		11	2	8	0	1	0	1	0	—		21	2
Coritiba (loan)	2022	Série A	7	2	—		—		—		—		7	2
Coritiba (loan)	2023	Série A	0	0	4	0	1	0	—		—		5	0
Coritiba (loan)	Total		7	2	4	0	1	0	—		—		12	2
Ituano (loan)	2023	Série B	18	4	—		—		—		—		18	4
Ituano (loan)	2024	Série B	—		5	0	0	0	—		—		5	0
Ituano (loan)	Total		18	4	5	0	0	0	—		—		23	4
Murcia	2024–25	Primera Federación	11	3	—		0	0	—		1 (Note: Appearance(s) in the promotion play-offs)	0	12	3
Murcia	2025–26	Primera Federación	5	0	—		0	0	—		—		5	0
Murcia	Total		16	3	—		0	0	—		1	0	17	3
Portuguesa	2026	Série D	14	7	5	2	2	0	—		—		21	9
Santa Cruz (loan)	2026	Série C	5	0	—		—		—		—		5	0
Career total			71	18	29	2	4	0	1	0	2	0	107	20
