= Kaique Rocha =

Brazilian footballer (born 2001)

Personal information
- Full name: Kaique Rocha Lima
- Date of birth: 28 February 2001 (age 25)
- Place of birth: Taboão da Serra, Brazil
- Height: 1.95 m (6 ft 5 in)
- Position: Centre back

Team information
- Current team: Casa Pia
- Number: 27

Youth career
- São Paulo
- 2013–2018: Santos
- 2019–2020: Sampdoria

Senior career*
| Years | Team | Apps | (Gls) |
| 2018–2019 | Santos | 0 | (0) |
| 2019–2023 | Sampdoria | 0 | (0) |
| 2021–2022 | → Internacional (loan) | 23 | (0) |
| 2023–2025 | Athletico Paranaense | 73 | (1) |
| 2025 | Internacional | 1 | (0) |
| 2025– | Casa Pia | 6 | (1) |

International career
| 2018 | Brazil U17 | 5 | (0) |
- * Club domestic league appearances and goals as of 18 May 2026

Kaique Rocha Lima (born 28 February 2001), better known as Kaique Rocha, is a Brazilian footballer who plays as a centre-back for Portuguese Primeira Liga club Casa Pia.

== Club career ==
=== Santos ===
Born in Taboão da Serra, São Paulo, Kaique joined Santos' youth setup in 2013 at the age of 12. On 22 March 2017, he signed his first professional contract after agreeing to a three-year deal.

On 9 November 2018, as Robson Bambu's contract was due to expire and Lucas Veríssimo and Luiz Felipe were both injured, Kaique was called up to the first team by manager Cuca.

=== Sampdoria ===
On 2 September 2019, Kaique signed a five-year contract with Serie A side Sampdoria, for a rumoured fee of €1.2 million; Santos also retained 15% of a future sale. After being initially assigned to the Primavera squad, he made his professional debut on 27 October 2020 by starting in a 1–0 Coppa Italia home win against Salernitana.

On 30 August 2021, Kaique returned to his home country after agreeing to a two-year loan deal with Internacional.

On 20 January 2023, Kaique's contract with Sampdoria was terminated by mutual consent.

=== Athletico Paranaense ===
On 3 February 2023, Kaique signed a four-year deal with Athletico Paranaense.

=== Internacional ===
Kaique returned to Internacional in 2025, being an option for defense. He was part of the group that won the 2025 Campeonato Gaúcho.

=== Casa Pia ===
On 28 July 2025, Kaique moved to Portugal, signing a three-year contract with an option for a further year, with Primeira Liga club Casa Pia, for a reported transfer fee of €250.000.

== International career ==
On 7 March 2018, Kaique was called up to Brazil under-17s for two friendlies against England.

== Career statistics ==
As of 28 February 2023

Appearances and goals by club, season and competition
| Club | Season | League | | | State league | | Cup | | Continental | | Other | | Total | |
| Club | Season | Division | Apps | Goals | Apps | Goals | Apps | Goals | Apps | Goals | Apps | Goals | Apps | Goals |
|---|---|---|---|---|---|---|---|---|---|---|---|---|---|---|
| Santos | 2018 | Série A | 0 | 0 | — | | — | | — | | — | | 0 | 0 |
| Santos | 2019 | Série A | 0 | 0 | 0 | 0 | 0 | 0 | 0 | 0 | — | | 0 | 0 |
| Santos | Total | | 0 | 0 | 0 | 0 | 0 | 0 | 0 | 0 | — | | 0 | 0 |
| Sampdoria | 2019–20 | Serie A | 0 | 0 | — | | 0 | 0 | — | | — | | 0 | 0 |
| Sampdoria | 2020–21 | Serie A | 0 | 0 | — | | 1 | 0 | — | | — | | 1 | 0 |
| Sampdoria | Total | | 0 | 0 | 0 | 0 | 1 | 0 | — | | — | | 1 | 0 |
| Internacional (loan) | 2021 | Série A | 3 | 0 | — | | — | | — | | — | | 3 | 0 |
| Internacional (loan) | 2022 | Série A | 7 | 0 | 10 | 0 | 1 | 0 | 2 (Note: Appearance(s) in Copa Sudamericana) | 0 | — | | 20 | 0 |
| Internacional (loan) | Total | | 10 | 0 | 10 | 0 | 1 | 0 | 2 | 0 | — | | 23 | 0 |
| Athletico Paranaense | 2023 | Série A | 0 | 0 | 0 | 0 | 0 | 0 | 0 | 0 | — | | 0 | 0 |
| Career total | | | 10 | 0 | 10 | 0 | 2 | 0 | 2 | 0 | 0 | 0 | 24 | 0 |

== Honours ==
Athletico Paranaense

- Campeonato Paranaense: 2023

Internacional

- Campeonato Gaúcho: 2025
