= Víctor Cuesta =

Argentine footballer (born 1988)

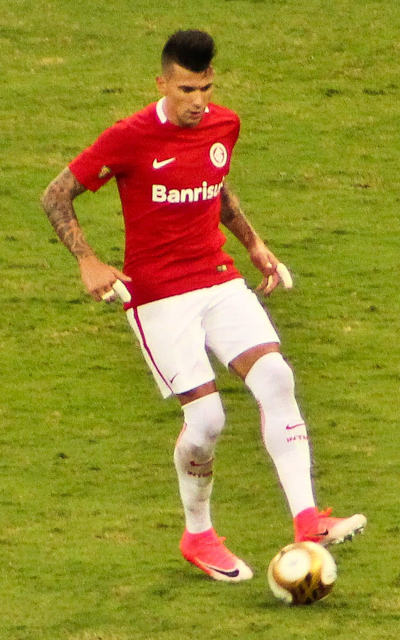
- Cuesta playing for Internacional in 2017

Personal information
- Full name: Víctor Leandro Cuesta
- Date of birth: 19 November 1988 (age 38)
- Place of birth: La Plata, Argentina
- Height: 1.87 m (6 ft 1 1/2 in)
- Position: Centre back

Team information
- Current team: Platense
- Number: 31

Youth career
- –2008: Arsenal Sarandí

Senior career*
Years	Team	Apps	(Gls)
2008–2014	Arsenal de Sarandí	19	(1)
2010–2011	→ Defensa y Justicia (loan)	34	(2)
2013–2014	→ Huracán (loan)	33	(1)
2014–2016	Independiente	73	(6)
2017–2024	Internacional	208	(8)
2022–2023	→ Botafogo (loan)	37	(5)
2024–2025	Bahia	10	(0)
2025–2026	Newell's Old Boys	25	(2)
2026–	Platense	22	(2)

International career^{‡}
2016	Argentina Olympic (O.P.)	2	(0)
2016	Argentina	3	(1)
- * Club domestic league appearances and goals as of 17:17, 22 November 2026 (UTC) ‡ National team caps and goals as of 22 June 2016

Víctor Leandro Cuesta (born 19 November 1988) is an Argentine professional footballer who plays as a central defender for Platense.

== Club career ==
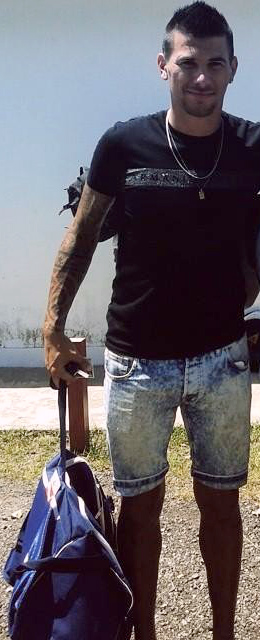
Cuesta in 2015

Born in La Plata, Cuesta joined Arsenal Sarandí as a youth player, progressing to the senior team in 2008. Struggling to get first team action, he was loaned to Defensa y Justicia in January 2010, playing at the time in the Nacional B. He made 34 appearances and scored 2 goals during his one-and-a-half-year stint at the club.

Cuesta returned to Arsenal in 2011 and was part of the squad that won the 2012 Clausura, the 2012 Supercopa and the 2012–13 Copa Argentina, being used mainly as a substitute and making 19 appearances over two seasons. In 2013, he was loaned to Huracán and there enjoyed a successful spell, winning the Copa Argentina as a starter.

=== Independiente ===
In 2014, after 6 years contracted to Arsenal, Cuesta transferred to Independiente for $1 million.

=== Internacional ===
On 2 March 2017 Internacional signed Cuesta from Independiente. The Brazilian club paid a $0.5 million fee for 50% of his rights with clauses that could raise the total fee to $2.5 million.

Cuesta was a key member in the 2017 Brazilian Série B campaign, helping Internacional finishing in second place returning to Brazilian top level Série A.

In the following year he was selected to the Bola de Prata and 2018 Série A team of the year.

== International career ==
Cuesta was chosen as the overage player for the Argentina under-23 squad at the 2016 Olympic tournament in Brazil.

In May 2016, he received his first call up to the senior team as a member of the squad for the Copa América Centenario. He made his debut on 27 May 2016, coming off the bench in a 1–0 win against Honduras.

=== International goals ===
No.	Date	Venue	Opponent	Score	Result	Competition	Ref.
1.	14 June 2016	CenturyLink Field, Seattle, United States	Bolivia	3–0	3–0	Copa America Centenario	

== Career statistics ==
=== Club ===
As of 15 March 2023.

Club	Season	League			Cup		Continental		State League		Other		Total	
Club	Season	Division	Apps	Goals	Apps	Goals	Apps	Goals	Apps	Goals	Apps	Goals	Apps	Goals
Defensa y Justicia (loan)	2009–10	Primera B Nacional	17	1	—		—		—		—		17	1
Defensa y Justicia (loan)	2010–11	Primera B Nacional	17	1	—		—		—		—		17	1
Defensa y Justicia (loan)	Total		34	2	—		—		—		—		34	2
Arsenal de Sarandí	2011–12	Primera División	8	0	2	1	2 (Note: Appearance(s) in Copa Libertadores.)	0	—		—		12	1
Arsenal de Sarandí	2012–13	Primera División	11	1	1	0	4	0	—		—		16	1
Arsenal de Sarandí	2013–14	Primera División	0	0	1	0	—		—		—		1	0
Arsenal de Sarandí	Total		19	1	4	1	6	0	—		—		29	2
Huracán (loan)	2013–14	Primera B Nacional	33	1	1	0	—		—		—		34	1
Independiente	2014	Primera División	16	1	1	0	—		—		—		17	1
Independiente	2015	Primera División	30	1	2	0	6 (Note: Appearance(s) in Copa Sudamericana.)	0	—		—		38	1
Independiente	2016	Primera División	15	3	1	0	4	0	—		—		20	3
Independiente	2016–17	Primera División	12	1	0	0	—		—		—		12	1
Independiente	Total		73	6	4	0	10	0	—		—		87	6
Internacional	2017	Série B	27	3	4	0	—		9 (Note: Appearance(s) in Campeonato Gaúcho.)	1	—		40	4
Internacional	2018	Série A	34	2	6	0	—		7	0	—		47	2
Internacional	2019	Série A	31	1	8	0	10	0	11	0	—		60	1
Internacional	2020	Série A	35	1	4	0	10	0	8	0	—		53	1
Internacional	2021	Série A	35	0	2	0	8	2	9	0	—		51	1
Internacional	2021	Série A	0	0	1	0	0	0	11	0	—		12	0
Internacional	Total		162	7	25	0	28	2	46	1	—		261	10
Botafogo (loan)	2022	Série A	29	4	—		—		—		—		29	4
Botafogo (loan)	2023	Série A	0	0	1	0	0	0	8 (Note: Appearance(s) in Campeonato Carioca.)	1	—		9	1
Botafogo (loan)	Total		29	4	1	0	0	0	8	1	—		38	5
Career total			350	21	35	1	44	2	54	2	0	0	483	26

== Honours ==
=== Club ===
Arsenal de Sarandí

- Primera División: 2012 Clausura
- Supercopa Argentina: 2012
- Copa Argentina: 2012–13

Huracán

- Copa Argentina: 2013–14

=== International ===
Argentina

- Copa América: Runner-up 2016

=== Individual ===
- Bola de Prata: 2018
- Campeonato Brasileiro Série A Team of the Year: 2018
