= Bruno Méndez (footballer) =

Uruguayan footballer (born 1999)

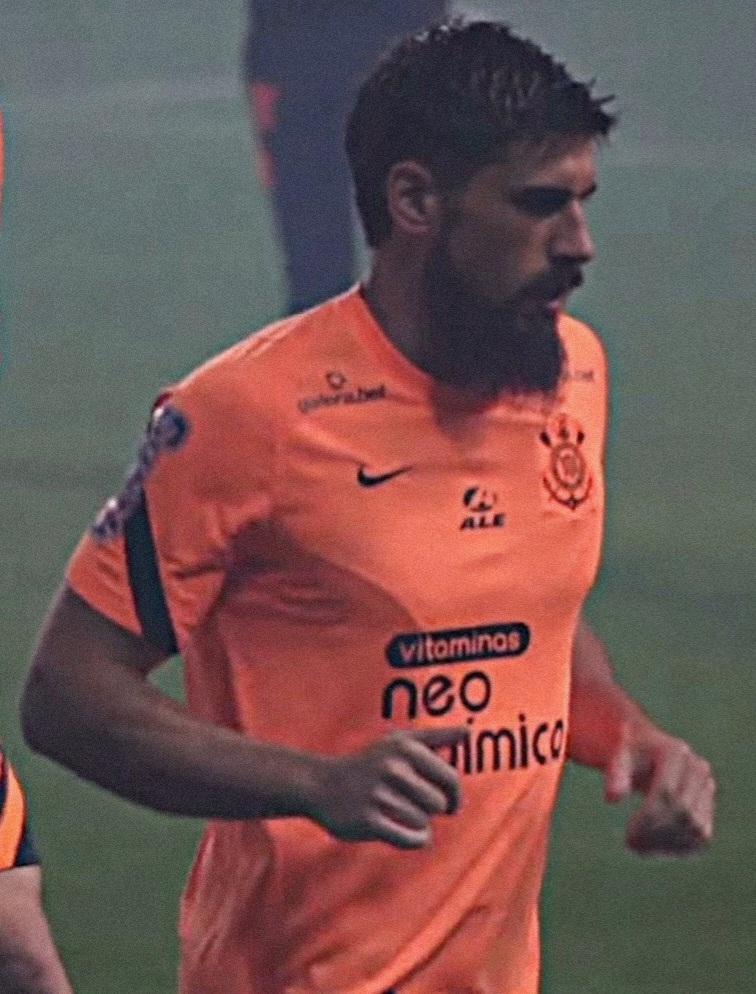
- Méndez with Corinthians in 2022

Personal information
- Full name: Bruno Méndez Cittadini
- Date of birth: 10 September 1999 (age 27)
- Place of birth: Montevideo, Uruguay
- Height: 1.84 m (6 ft 0 in)
- Positions: Centre-back; right-back

Team information
- Current team: Toluca
- Number: 4

Youth career
- 2009–2011: Danubio
- 2011–2017: Montevideo Wanderers

Senior career*
Years	Team	Apps	(Gls)
2017–2019	Montevideo Wanderers	27	(1)
2019–2023	Corinthians	88	(1)
2021–2022	→ Internacional (loan)	39	(2)
2024	Granada	17	(2)
2024–	Toluca	51	(1)

International career
2017	Uruguay U18	8	(0)
2018–2019	Uruguay U20	32	(0)
2019	Uruguay U22	4	(0)
2018–2024	Uruguay	7	(0)
Medal record
Men's football
Representing Uruguay
South American Games
Silver medal – second place	2018 Cochabamba	Team
- * Club domestic league appearances and goals as of 19 April 2026

Bruno Méndez Cittadini (born 10 September 1999) is a Uruguayan professional footballer who plays as a centre-back or right-back for Liga MX club Toluca.

== Club career ==
=== Montevideo Wanderers ===
Méndez developed through the academy of Montevideo Wanderers and made his professional debut on 19 November 2017 against Rampla Juniors in a 1–0 home win. He scored his debut professional goal on 21 October 2018 against River Plate Montevideo in a 5–0 away win.

=== Corinthians ===
In February 2019, he signed a four-year contract with Brazilian Série A club Corinthians.

==== Internacional (loan) ====
On 1 July 2021, Corinthians sent Méndez on a one-year loan to fellow Série A club Internacional.

=== Granada ===
On 26 December 2023, La Liga side Granada announced that Méndez would join the club on 1 January 2024.

=== Toluca ===
On 9 July 2024, Méndez joined Liga MX club Toluca.

== International career ==
=== Youth ===
Méndez is a former Uruguay youth international and has represented his nation at different age levels. He was also the captain of Uruguay team at the 2019 South American U-20 Championship, 2019 FIFA U-20 World Cup and the 2019 Pan American Games.

=== Senior ===
Following the injuries of Diego Godín and Marcelo Saracchi, Méndez received his first call-up to the Uruguay senior team for friendlies against Brazil and France in November 2018. He made his debut in a friendly that was played in London against Brazil on 16 November 2018 and played the full game.

On 21 October 2022, Méndez was named in Uruguay's 55-man preliminary squad for the 2022 FIFA World Cup.

== Career statistics ==
=== Club ===
As of 24 May 2024.

Club	Season	League			Cup		Continental		State League		Other		Total	
Club	Season	Division	Apps	Goals	Apps	Goals	Apps	Goals	Apps	Goals	Apps	Goals	Apps	Goals
Montevideo Wanderers	2017	Primera División	4	0	—		—		—		—		4	0
Montevideo Wanderers	2018	Primera División	23	1	—		0	0	—		—		23	1
Montevideo Wanderers	Total		27	1	—		0	0	—		—		27	1
Corinthians	2019	Série A	6	0	0	0	0	0	0	0	—		6	0
Corinthians	2020	Série A	16	0	0	0	0	0	2 (Note: Appearances in Campeonato Paulista.)	0	—		18	0
Corinthians	2021	Série A	0	0	3	0	4 (Note: Appearances in Copa Sudamericana.)	0	8	1	—		15	1
Corinthians	2022	Série A	18	0	—		4 (Note: Appearances in Copa Libertadores.)	0	—		—		22	0
Corinthians	2023	Série A	27	0	0	0	2	0	11	0	—		40	0
Corinthians	Total		67	0	3	0	10	0	21	1	—		101	1
Internacional (loan)	2021	Série A	25	0	—		2	0	—		—		27	0
Internacional (loan)	2022	Série A	6	1	1	0	6	0	8 (Note: Appearances in Campeonato Gaúcho.)	1	—		21	2
Internacional (loan)	Total		31	1	1	0	8	0	8	1	—		48	2
Granada	2023–24	La Liga	17	2	—		—		—		—		17	2
Career total			142	4	4	0	18	0	29	1	0	0	193	6

=== International ===
As of match played 23 March 2024

Appearances and goals by national team and year
National team	Year	Apps	Goals
Uruguay	2018	2	0
Uruguay	2019	0	0
Uruguay	2023	4	0
Uruguay	2024	1 (Note: Includes a Non-FIFA friendly played against the Basque Country, which is counted as an official match by the Uruguayan Football Association.)	0
Total		7	0

== Honours ==
Toluca

- Liga MX: Clausura 2025, Apertura 2025
- Campeón de Campeones: 2025
- Campeones Cup : 2025
- CONCACAF Champions Cup: 2026
- Leagues Cup: 2026

Uruguay U20

- South American Games silver medal: 2018

Individual

- Liga MX All-Star: 2026
