= Daniel (footballer, born 1994) =

Brazilian footballer (born 1994)

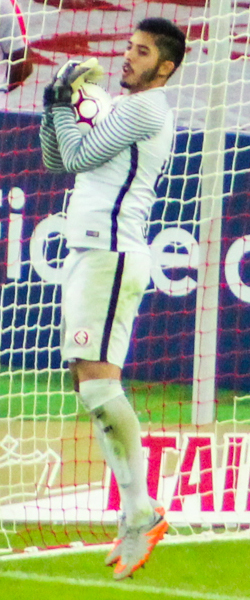
- Daniel in 2017 with Internacional

Personal information
- Full name: Daniel de Sousa Britto
- Date of birth: 6 May 1994 (age 32)
- Place of birth: Barra do Garças, Brazil
- Height: 1.88 m (6 ft 2 in)
- Position: Goalkeeper

Team information
- Current team: FC Dallas

Youth career
- União Rondonópolis
- 2011–2017: Internacional

Senior career*
Years	Team	Apps	(Gls)
2017–2022	Internacional	68	(0)
2023–2026	San Jose Earthquakes	78	(0)
2026–	FC Dallas	0	(0)
- * Club domestic league appearances and goals as of 9 July 2026

Daniel de Sousa Britto (born 6 May 1994) is a Brazilian professional footballer who plays as a goalkeeper for Major League Soccer club FC Dallas.

== Club career ==
Born in Barra do Garças, Daniel started his youth career with the academy of União Rondonópolis. In 2011, he moved to the under-17 squad of Internacional and progressed through the under-20 and under-23 teams in the following years.

On 9 May 2017, he was called up to the senior team for a Série B match against Londrina following the injuries of Danilo Fernandes, Marcelo Lomba and Keiller. Four days later, he made his debut in a 3–0 victory against Londrina. He also featured in a 1–0 defeat against Palmeiras in Copa do Brasil during the season.

On 15 June 2018, Daniel's contract was extended until 2021.

On 22 January 2023, Daniel was announced on San Jose Earthquakes for a two-year contract.

On 9 July 2026, Daniel was transferred from San Jose to fellow MLS club FC Dallas in exchange for up to $1 million in General Allocation Money.

== Career statistics ==
As of match played 9 July 2026

Appearances and goals by club, season, and competition
Club	Season	League			State League		Cup		Continental		Other		Total	
Club	Season	Division	Apps	Goals	Apps	Goals	Apps	Goals	Apps	Goals	Apps	Goals	Apps	Goals
Internacional	2017	Série B	3	0	0	0	1	0	—		0	0	4	0
Internacional	2018	Série A	1	0	0	0	0	0	—		—		1	0
Internacional	2019	Série A	0	0	3	0	0	0	0	0	—		3	0
Internacional	2020	Série A	1	0	0	0	0	0	0	0	—		1	0
Internacional	2021	Série A	23	0	5	0	2	0	2 (Note: Appearance(s) in Copa Libertadores)	0	—		32	0
Internacional	2022	Série A	23	0	12	0	1	0	10 (Note: Appearance(s) in Copa Sudamericana)	0	—		46	0
Internacional	Total		51	0	20	0	4	0	13	0	0	0	87	0
San Jose Earthquakes	2023	MLS	22	0	—		1	0	—		3 (Note: Two appearances in Leagues Cup, one appearance in MLS Cup Playoffs)	0	26	0
San Jose Earthquakes	2024	MLS	12	0	—		0	0	—		1 (Note: Appearance(s) in Leagues Cup)	0	13	0
San Jose Earthquakes	2025	MLS	29	0	—		1	0	—		—		30	0
San Jose Earthquakes	2026	MLS	15	0	—		—		—		—		15	0
San Jose Earthquakes	Total		78	0	—		2	0	—		4	0	79	0
Career total			129	0	20	0	6	0	13	0	4	0	171	0
