= Edenilson =

Brazilian footballer (born 1989)

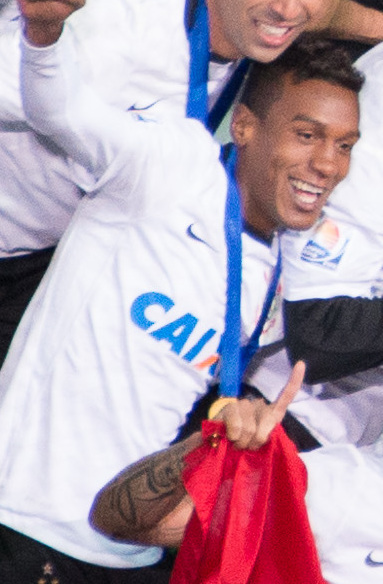
- Edenilson celebrating after winning the 2012 FIFA Club World Cup with Corinthians

Personal information
- Full name: Edenilson Andrade dos Santos
- Date of birth: 18 December 1989 (age 36)
- Place of birth: Porto Alegre, Brazil
- Height: 1.75 m (5 ft 9 in)
- Position: Central midfielder

Team information
- Current team: Botafogo
- Number: 88

Youth career
- 2008: Guarani-VA
- 2008–2009: Caxias

Senior career*
| Years | Team | Apps | (Gls) |
| 2009–2011 | Caxias | 13 | (1) |
| 2011–2014 | Corinthians | 85 | (2) |
| 2014–2015 | Genoa | 30 | (0) |
| 2015–2017 | Udinese | 29 | (0) |
| 2016–2017 | → Genoa (loan) | 16 | (0) |
| 2017–2022 | Internacional | 191 | (32) |
| 2023–2024 | Atlético Mineiro | 28 | (1) |
| 2024–2026 | Grêmio | 64 | (5) |
| 2026– | Botafogo | 8 | (2) |

International career^{‡}
| 2021 | Brazil | 2 | (0) |
- * Club domestic league appearances and goals as of 7 April 2026 ‡ National team caps and goals as of 14 October 2021

Edenilson Andrade dos Santos (born 18 December 1989), simply known as Edenilson, is a Brazilian footballer who plays for Botafogo. Mainly a central midfielder, he can also play as a right back.

== Club career ==
Edenilson began his career with Guarani de Venâncio Aires in 2008, but moved to Caxias shortly after. His professional debut came in the 2009 Gaúcho, when he entered the second half of the match against Veranópolis, on 22 January. He scored his first goal for the club later in that year, in a 3–1 win over rivals Juventude. Edenilson played 82 games for the Grenás, mostly as a starter, winning 36 and drawing 22 of those matches.

In 2011, Edenilson joined Corinthians, where he featured regularly before moving to Italy with Genoa in 2014. In the following year, he was bought by Udinese.

On 31 August 2016, Edenilson returned to Genoa on a season-long loan deal. After his loan to Genoa was cut short at the end of March, he signed with Internacional on loan until the end of the season.

On 11 July 2018, Internacional exercised the option in the loan contract and made the transfer permanent, signing a three-year contract with Edenilson.

On 22 December 2022, Edenilson joined Atlético Mineiro on a two-year deal.

On 19 April 2024, Edenilson joined Grêmio on a deal running until December 2025.

== International career ==
He made his debut for the Brazil national football team on 9 September 2021 in a World Cup qualifier against Peru.

== Career statistics ==
=== Club ===
As of match played 19 April 2024

| Club | Season | League | | | State league (Note: Includes Campeonato Gaúcho, Campeonato Paulista, Campeonato Mineiro) | | National cup (Note: Includes Copa do Brasil, Coppa Italia) | | Continental | | Other | | Total | |
| Club | Season | Division | Apps | Goals | Apps | Goals | Apps | Goals | Apps | Goals | Apps | Goals | Apps | Goals |
|---|---|---|---|---|---|---|---|---|---|---|---|---|---|---|
| Caxias | 2009 | Série C | 5 | 0 | 8 | 0 | 0 | 0 | — | | 14 (Note: Appearances in Copa FGF) | 2 | 27 | 2 |
| Caxias | 2010 | Série C | 8 | 1 | 16 | 2 | — | | — | | 10 | 1 | 34 | 4 |
| Caxias | 2011 | Série C | 0 | 0 | 17 | 0 | 4 | 0 | — | | — | | 21 | 0 |
| Caxias | Total | | 13 | 1 | 41 | 2 | 4 | 0 | — | | 24 | 3 | 82 | 6 |
| Corinthians | 2011 | Série A | 26 | 0 | — | | — | | — | | — | | 26 | 0 |
| Corinthians | 2012 | Série A | 23 | 2 | 13 | 0 | — | | 7 (Note: Appearances in Copa Libertadores) | 0 | 0 | 0 | 43 | 2 |
| Corinthians | 2013 | Série A | 36 | 0 | 16 | 1 | 4 | 0 | 4 | 1 | 2 (Note: Appearances in Recopa Sudamericana) | 0 | 62 | 2 |
| Corinthians | 2014 | Série A | 0 | 0 | 1 | 0 | 0 | 0 | — | | — | | 1 | 0 |
| Corinthians | Total | | 85 | 2 | 30 | 1 | 4 | 0 | 11 | 1 | 2 | 0 | 132 | 4 |
| Genoa | 2014–15 | Serie A | 30 | 0 | — | | 1 | 0 | — | | — | | 31 | 0 |
| Udinese | 2015–16 | Serie A | 29 | 0 | — | | 1 | 1 | — | | — | | 30 | 1 |
| Genoa (loan) | 2016–17 | Serie A | 16 | 0 | — | | 1 | 0 | — | | — | | 17 | 0 |
| Internacional | 2017 | Série B | 31 | 1 | 5 | 0 | 2 | 0 | — | | 1 (Note: Appearance in Primeira Liga) | 0 | 39 | 1 |
| Internacional | 2018 | Série A | 33 | 3 | 9 | 0 | 5 | 2 | — | | — | | 47 | 5 |
| Internacional | 2019 | Série A | 30 | 5 | 11 | 0 | 8 | 2 | 9 | 1 | — | | 58 | 8 |
| Internacional | 2020 | Série A | 33 | 6 | 9 | 3 | 4 | 0 | 8 | 0 | — | | 54 | 9 |
| Internacional | 2021 | Série A | 33 | 11 | 11 | 3 | 2 | 0 | 8 | 1 | — | | 54 | 15 |
| Internacional | 2022 | Série A | 31 | 6 | 12 | 1 | 1 | 0 | 10 (Note: Appearances in Copa Sudamericana) | 3 | — | | 54 | 10 |
| Internacional | Total | | 191 | 32 | 57 | 7 | 22 | 4 | 35 | 5 | 1 | 0 | 306 | 48 |
| Atlético Mineiro | 2023 | Série A | 28 | 1 | 11 | 0 | 3 | 0 | 9 | 1 | — | | 51 | 2 |
| Atlético Mineiro | 2024 | Série A | 0 | 0 | 9 | 1 | — | | 0 | 0 | — | | 9 | 1 |
| Atlético Mineiro | Total | | 28 | 1 | 20 | 1 | 3 | 0 | 9 | 1 | — | | 60 | 3 |
| Career total | | | 392 | 36 | 148 | 11 | 36 | 5 | 55 | 7 | 27 | 3 | 658 | 62 |

=== International ===
As of 26 November 2021

Brazil
| Year | Apps | Goals |
| 2021 | 2 | 0 |
| Total | 2 | 0 |

== Honours ==
Corinthians

- Campeonato Brasileiro Série A: 2011
- Copa Libertadores: 2012
- FIFA Club World Cup: 2012
- Campeonato Paulista: 2013
- Recopa Sudamericana: 2013

Atlético Mineiro

- Campeonato Mineiro: 2023, 2024

Grêmio

- Recopa Gaúcha: 2025

Individual

- Best Central Midfielder in Brazil: 2020
