= Rodrigo Dourado =

Brazilian footballer (born 1994)

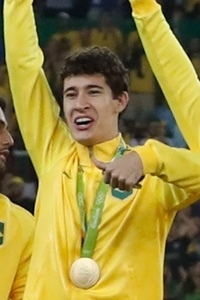
- Dourado celebrating the gold medal with Brazil at the 2016 Summer Olympics

Personal information
- Full name: Rodrigo Dourado Cunha
- Date of birth: 17 June 1994 (age 32)
- Place of birth: Pelotas, Brazil
- Height: 1.83 m (6 ft 0 in)
- Position: Defensive midfielder

Team information
- Current team: Juárez (on loan from América)
- Number: 13

Youth career
- Internacional

Senior career*
Years	Team	Apps	(Gls)
2012–2022	Internacional	233	(15)
2022–2025	Atlético San Luis	120	(5)
2026–	América	17	(0)
2026–	→ Juárez (loan)	7	(1)

International career^{‡}
2011	Brazil U17	4	(0)
2016	Brazil U23	1	(0)
Medal record
Olympic Games
Gold medal – first place	2016 Rio de Janeiro	Team
- * Club domestic league appearances and goals as of 03:07,12 October 2026 (UTC) ‡ National team caps and goals as of 15 December 2016 (UTC)

Rodrigo Dourado Cunha (born 17 June 1994) is a Brazilian professional footballer who plays as a defensive midfielder for Liga MX club Juárez, on loan from América.

== Club career ==
=== Internacional ===
Dourado came through the youth system of Internacional. He made his professional debut on January 26, 2012, in a Campeonato Gaúcho match against Cerâmica, and later featured in the Brasileirão on September 16 of the same year in a match against Recife.

=== Atlético San Luis ===
His move to Mexican football occurred ahead of the Apertura 2022, when he joined Atlético de San Luis.

=== América ===
On January 4, 2026, América officially announced the signing of Dourado as a reinforcement for the Clausura 2026 tournament.

== International career ==
Dourado was a member of Brazil’s U-17 national team that competed in the 2011 South American Championship, where he contributed to the squad’s title-winning campaign.

On March 4, 2016, he received his first call-up to the U-23 Olympic Team for a series of friendly matches. Later that year, Dourado was selected to represent Brazil at the Summer Olympics in Rio de Janeiro, where he played a role in securing the nation’s historic first Olympic gold medal in football, achieved in the final against Germany.

== Career statistics ==
=== Club ===
As of 29 November 2021

Club	Season	League			State League		Cup		Continental		Other		Total	
Club	Season	Division	Apps	Goals	Apps	Goals	Apps	Goals	Apps	Goals	Apps	Goals	Apps	Goals
Internacional	2012	Série A	1	0	1 (Note: Appearance(s) in Campeonato Gaúcho)	0	0	0	0	0	—		2	0
Internacional	2013	Série A	0	0	2	0	0	0	0	0	—		2	0
Internacional	2014	Série A	0	0	3	0	0	0	0	0	—		3	0
Internacional	2015	Série A	30	1	12	0	4	0	8 (Note: Appearance(s) in Copa Libertadores)	0	—		54	1
Internacional	2016	Série A	23	0	9	1	4	0	0	0	3 (Note: Appearance(s) in Primeira Liga)	1	39	2
Internacional	2017	Série B	31	0	15	3	7	1	—		2	0	55	4
Internacional	2018	Série A	33	1	8	1	6	0	—		—		47	2
Internacional	2019	Série A	1	0	9	0	1	0	6	0	—		17	0
Internacional	2020	Série A	19	3	0	0	0	0	2	0	—		21	3
Internacional	2021	Série A	27	2	9	3	1	0	8	0	—		45	5
Career total			165	7	68	8	23	1	24	0	5	1	285	17

== Honours ==
Internacional

Brazil

- Olympic Gold Medal: 2016

Individual

- Bola de Prata: 2018
- Campeonato Brasileiro Série A Team of the Year: 2018
- Liga MX All-Star: 2024, 2025
