= Rodrigo Lindoso =

Brazilian footballer

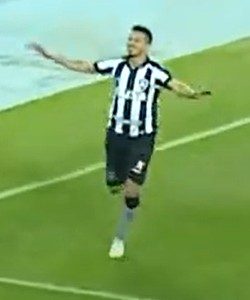
- Lindoso with Botafogo in 2017

Personal information
- Full name: Rodrigo Oliveira Lindoso
- Date of birth: 6 June 1989 (age 37)
- Place of birth: São Luís, Brazil
- Height: 1.82 m (5 ft 11 1/2 in)
- Position: Midfielder

Team information
- Current team: Operário Ferroviário
- Number: 19

Youth career
- 2004–2005: São Luís FC
- 2006–2007: Nacional-PR
- 2007–2009: Madureira

Senior career*
Years	Team	Apps	(Gls)
2009–2013	Madureira	71	(23)
2011–2012	→ Fluminense (loan)	5	(0)
2012	→ Criciúma (loan)	7	(0)
2013	Marítimo	8	(0)
2014–2015	Madureira	53	(10)
2015	→ Botafogo (loan)	12	(0)
2016–2018	Botafogo	151	(16)
2019–2022	Internacional	109	(6)
2022	→ Ceará (loan)	15	(0)
2024–	Operário Ferroviário	1	(0)
- * Club domestic league appearances and goals as of 19 April 2024

Rodrigo Oliveira Lindoso (born 6 June 1989) is a Brazilian professional footballer for Operário Ferroviário.

== Club career ==
=== Madureira and loans ===
Born in São Luís, Maranhão, Lindoso was a Madureira youth graduate. He made his first team debut on 5 July 2009, starting in a 0–0 Série D home draw against Tupi.

Lindoso became a regular starter for the side in the following campaigns, scoring a hat-trick in a 4–3 home win against Botafogo-SP on 14 August 2010. Impressing during the 2011 Campeonato Carioca, he joined Série A side Fluminense on 16 May 2011, on loan for one year.

Lindoso made his top tier debut on 7 September 2011, starting in a 2–1 away win against Cruzeiro. The following February, after being rarely used, he moved to Criciúma also in a temporary deal.

After again receiving limited chances, Lindoso returned to Madureira for the 2013 Campeonato Carioca, where he stood out as one of the team's best performers.

=== Marítimo ===
On 25 June 2013, Lindoso signed a four-year contract with Portuguese Primeira Liga side C.S. Marítimo. He made his debut abroad on 1 September, coming on as a half-time substitute for João Luiz in a 1–1 home draw against S.C. Olhanense.

Lindoso struggled to appear for the side, being also sidelined due to an injury.

=== Madureira return ===
In February 2014, Lindoso returned to Madureira after rescinding his contract with Marítimo. He immediately became a first-choice for the club, scoring five goals in the 2015 Campeonato Carioca.

=== Botafogo ===
On 21 July 2015, Lindoso was loaned to Botafogo in the Série B, until the end of the year. On 1 December, after achieving top tier promotion as champions, he signed a permanent two-year contract with the club.

Lindoso scored his first goal in the first division on 21 May 2017, netting his team's second in a 2–0 home win against Ponte Preta. On 14 July, he extended his contract until 2019.

=== Internacional ===
On 8 January 2019, Lindoso agreed to a two-year deal with Internacional, with Alex Santana moving in the opposite direction.

== Career statistics ==
As of 29 November 2021

Club	Season	League			State League		Cup		Continental		Other		Total	
Club	Season	Division	Apps	Goals	Apps	Goals	Apps	Goals	Apps	Goals	Apps	Goals	Apps	Goals
Madureira	2009	Série D	6	0	0	0	—		—		16 (Note: Appearance(s) in Copa Rio)	1	22	1
Madureira	2010	Série D	12	6	14	0	—		—		8	1	34	7
Madureira	2011	Série C	0	0	17	7	—		—		—		17	7
Madureira	2012	Série C	10	5	—		—		—		5	0	15	5
Madureira	2013	Série C	0	0	12	5	—		—		—		12	5
Madureira	Total		28	11	43	12	—		—		29	2	100	25
Fluminense (loan)	2011	Série A	4	0	—		—		—		—		4	0
Fluminense (loan)	2012	Série A	0	0	1	0	—		—		—		1	0
Fluminense (loan)	Total		4	0	1	0	—		—		—		5	0
Criciúma (loan)	2012	Série B	0	0	5	0	1	0	—		—		6	0
Marítimo	2013–14	Primeira Liga	6	0	—		0	0	—		2 (Note: Appearance(s) in Taça da Liga)	0	8	0
Madureira	2014	Série C	11	2	7	0	—		—		10	3	28	5
Madureira	2015	Série C	8	0	15	5	2	0	—		—		25	5
Madureira	Total		19	2	22	5	2	0	—		10	3	53	10
Botafogo	2015	Série B	12	0	—		—		—		—		12	0
Botafogo	2016	Série A	25	0	17	3	5	0	—		—		47	3
Botafogo	2017	Série A	30	3	8	2	5	0	10 (Note: Appearance(s) in Copa Libertadores)	0	—		53	5
Botafogo	2018	Série A	32	7	12	1	1	0	6 (Note: Appearance(s) in Copa Sudamericana)	1	—		51	9
Botafogo	Total		99	10	37	6	11	0	16	1	—		163	17
Internacional	2019	Série A	27	4	6	0	7	1	6	1	—		46	6
Internacional	2020	Série A	30	0	10	0	2	0	11	0	—		53	0
Internacional	2021	Série A	25	2	7	0	0	0	3	0	—		35	2
Internacional	Total		82	6	23	0	9	1	20	1	—		134	8
Career total			238	29	131	23	23	1	36	2	41	5	469	60

== Honours ==
Botafogo

- Campeonato Brasileiro Série B: 2015
- Campeonato Carioca: 2018

=== Individual ===
- Campeonato Carioca Team of the year: 2018
