= Vinicius Machado =

Brazilian footballer

Personal information
- Full name: Vinicius Réquia Machado
- Date of birth: 29 February 2000 (age 26)
- Place of birth: Montenegro, Brazil
- Height: 1.89 m (6 ft 2 in)
- Position: Goalkeeper

Youth career
- 2012–2018: Grêmio

Senior career*
Years	Team	Apps	(Gls)
2018–2020	Grêmio	0	(0)
2021–2022	Ceará	6	(0)
2023	Anápolis	0	(0)
2023–2024	Nacional	1	(0)
- * Club domestic league appearances and goals as of 19 February 2023

Vinicius Réquia Machado (born 29 February 2000) is a Brazilian footballer who plays as a goalkeeper.

== Club career ==
Born in Montenegro, Rio Grande do Sul, Vinicius Machado joined Grêmio's youth setup in 2012, aged 12. On 25 October 2016, he signed his first professional deal with the club.

Vinicius Machado made his senior debut on 13 October 2018, starting in a 0–0 away draw against Avenida, for the year's Copa FGF. On 5 June 2020, he renewed his link until the end of 2021.

On 26 February 2021, Vinicius Machado moved to Ceará on a two-year contract. He made his Série A debut on 30 May 2021, coming on as a half-time substitute for injured João Ricardo in a 3–2 home success over Grêmio.

On 30 January 2023, Machado signed a two-and-a-half-year contract with Nacional.

== Career statistics ==
As of 25 October 2021

Club	Season	League			State League		Cup		Continental		Other		Total	
Club	Season	Division	Apps	Goals	Apps	Goals	Apps	Goals	Apps	Goals	Apps	Goals	Apps	Goals
Grêmio	2018	Série A	0	0	0	0	0	0	—		3 (Note: Appearance(s) in Copa FGF)	0	3	0
Grêmio	2019	Série A	0	0	0	0	0	0	—		6	0	6	0
Grêmio	2020	Série A	0	0	0	0	0	0	0	0	—		0	0
Grêmio	Total		0	0	0	0	0	0	0	0	9	0	9	0
Ceará	2021	Série A	4	0	2	0	0	0	—		0	0	6	0
Career total			4	0	2	0	0	0	0	0	9	0	15	0
