= Pedro Henrique (footballer, born 2001) =

Brazilian footballer

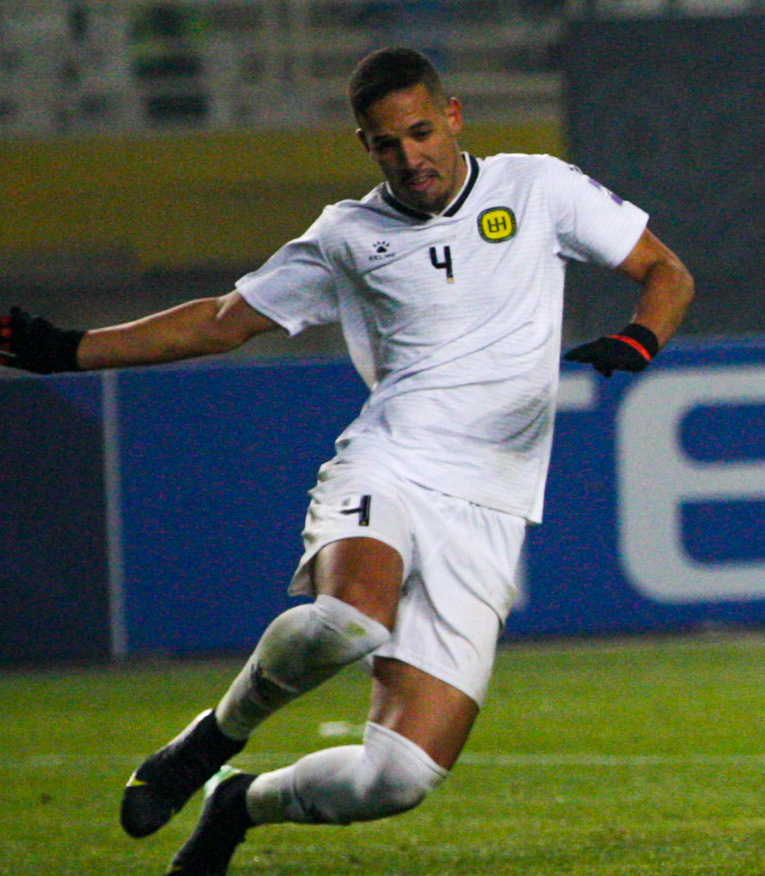
- Pedro Henrique with Al-Hussein in 2025

Personal information
- Full name: Pedro Henrique Alves Santana
- Date of birth: 31 January 2001 (age 25)
- Place of birth: Maceió, Brazil
- Height: 1.87 m (6 ft 2 in)
- Position: Centre-back

Team information
- Current team: Al-Hussein
- Number: 2

Senior career*
Years	Team	Apps	(Gls)
2020–2022	Internacional	14	(0)
2021	→ Sport Recife (loan)	5	(0)
2022	→ Unión La Calera (loan)	14	(0)
2022–2025	Ludogorets Razgrad II	35	(1)
2022–2025	Ludogorets Razgrad	0	(0)
2023	→ Beroe (loan)	16	(0)
2024	→ Guarani (loan)	3	(0)
2025–	Al-Hussein	21	(2)

International career^{‡}
2020	Brazil U20	3	(0)
- * Club domestic league appearances and goals as of 8 May 2026 ‡ National team caps and goals as of 9 May 2020

Pedro Henrique Alves Santana (born 31 January 2001), known as Pedro Henrique, is a Brazilian professional footballer who plays as a centre-back for Jordanian Pro League club Al-Hussein.

== Professional career ==
Pedro Henrique made his professional debut with Internacional in a 1-0 Campeonato Gaúcho win over Juventude on 23 January 2020. On 12 January 2023 he joined Beroe until end of the season, on loan from Ludogorets Razgrad. In January 2024, Henrique was sent on another loan spell, this time in his home country with Guarani FC, until the end of the year.

=== Al-Hussein ===
On 11 July 2025, Pedro Henrique signed with Jordanian Pro League club Al-Hussein for an undisclosed fee.

== Career statistics ==
=== Club ===
As of match played 17 February 2024

Appearances and goals by club, season and competition
Club	Season	League			State League		National cup		Continental		Other		Total	
Club	Season	Division	Apps	Goals	Apps	Goals	Apps	Goals	Apps	Goals	Apps	Goals	!Apps	Goals
Internacional	2020	Série A	1	0	4 (Note: Appearance(s) in Campeonato Gaúcho)	0	1	0	0	0	—		6	0
Internacional	2021	Série A	5	0	4	0	1	0	1 (Note: Appearance(s) in Copa Libertadores)	0	—		11	0
Internacional	Total		6	0	8	0	2	0	1	0	—		17	0
Sport Recife (loan)	2021	Série A	5	0	—		—		—		0	0	5	0
Unión La Calera (loan)	2022	Chilean Primera División	14	0	—		—		4 (Note: Appearance(s) in Copa Sudamericana)	0	—		18	0
Ludogorets II	2022-23	Vtora liga	7	0	—		—		—		—		7	0
Ludogorets II	2023-24	Vtora liga	16	1	—		—		—		—		16	1
Ludogorets II	2023-24	Vtora liga	1	0	—		—		—		—		1	0
Ludogorets II	Total		24	1	—		—		—		—		24	1
Ludogorets	2022-23	Parva Liga	0	0	—		1	0	—		0	0	1	0
Beroe (loan)	2022-23	Parva Liga	16	0	—		—		—		—		16	0
Guarani	Série B	2024	3	0	0	0	—		—		—		3	0
Al-Hussein	Jordanian Pro League	2025-26	0	0	—		0	0	0 (Note: Appearance(s) in AFC Champions League Two)	0	—		0	0
Career Total			68	1	8	0	3	0	5	0	0	0	84	1
