= Miguel Ángel Ramírez =

Spanish football manager

Personal information
- Full name: Miguel Ángel Ramírez Medina
- Date of birth: 23 October 1984 (age 42)
- Place of birth: Las Palmas, Spain
- Height: 1.77 m (5 ft 10 in)

Managerial career
- Years: Team
- Claret (youth)
- 2003–2010: Las Palmas (youth)
- 2010–2011: AEK (youth)
- 2011: Panathinaikos (youth)
- 2011: Olympiacos (youth)
- 2011–2012: Las Palmas (youth)
- 2012–2018: Aspire Academy (youth)
- 2018–2019: Independiente del Valle (youth)
- 2019–2020: Independiente del Valle
- 2021: Internacional
- 2021–2022: Charlotte
- 2023–2024: Sporting Gijón
- 2024: Al-Wakrah SC
- 2025: Zaragoza
- 2026: Malmö FF

Miguel Ángel Ramírez Medina (born 23 October 1984) is a Spanish football manager, currently he is not managing any club.

== Career ==
=== Early career ===
Born in Las Palmas, Canary Islands, Ramírez joined UD Las Palmas' youth categories in 2003, from AD Claret. In 2011 he moved to Greece, initially to work at AEK FC's youth setup, but subsequently worked at Panathinaikos FC and Olympiacos due to the economic crisis.

In 2012, after a year back at Las Palmas, Ramírez spent a few months working as a scout for Deportivo Alavés before moving to Qatar, joining the Aspire Academy. In 2018, after being also in charge of Qatar's under-14 football team and being assistant of compatriot Félix Sánchez Bas in the under-19s, he moved to Ecuador and was appointed manager of CSD Independiente del Valle's under-18 squad.

=== Independiente del Valle ===
On 7 May 2019, after compatriot Ismael Rescalvo was appointed in charge of CS Emelec, Ramírez was appointed manager of the first team. He led the club to the title of the 2019 Copa Sudamericana, the first of his career and the first international accolade of the club's history.

On 19 December 2020, Ramírez confirmed his departure from Del Valle after nearly two years as a manager.

=== Internacional ===
On 2 March 2021, Ramírez was announced as manager of Brazilian Série A side Internacional on a two-year contract. On 11 June, being knocked out of the Copa do Brasil by Série B side Vitória, he was sacked.

=== Charlotte FC ===
On 7 July 2021, Ramírez was announced as the new head coach of American club Charlotte FC for the club's first season in Major League Soccer. After 14 league matches in charge, Ramirez was sacked on 31 May 2022. This came even though Charlotte FC was tied for eighth place in the Eastern Conference at the time, just short of playoff position.

According to team captain Christian Fuchs, there were a number of "fractures" between the players and Ramírez. Fuchs told WBTV that when he tried to address problems with Ramírez, all too often "the door was shut and that didn't feel good." Fuchs added that Ramírez almost never did post-match analyses with the players, despite their youth.

=== Sporting Gijón ===
On 17 January 2023, Ramírez returned to his home country and was appointed in charge of Sporting de Gijón in Segunda División. He left the club on 15 June of the following year, after being knocked out by RCD Espanyol in the semifinals of the promotion play-offs.

=== Al-Wakrah ===
On 27 June 2024, Ramírez moved to Qatar Stars League side Al-Wakrah SC, signing a one-year contract with an option for extension.

=== Zaragoza ===
On 27 December 2024, Ramírez was announced as manager of Real Zaragoza in the second division. He was sacked the following 16 March, after a 4–1 loss to UD Almería.

=== Malmö FF ===
On 2 December 2025, Ramirez was announced as manager of Malmö FF after the sacking of the former manager, Henrik Rydström. On May 26 2026, Malmö announced that Ramirez had been sacked due to poor results during the spring season. This was following a 2-3 loss at home to newly-promoted team Västerås SK.

== Managerial statistics ==
As of 24 May 2026

Managerial record by team and tenure
Team	Nat.	From	To	Record								Ref
Team	Nat.	From	To	G	W	D	L	GF	GA	GD	Win %	Ref
Independiente del Valle	(Ecuador)	7 May 2019	21 December 2020	69	32	18	19	122	87	+35	46.38	
Internacional	(Brazil)	2 March 2021	11 June 2021	22	11	4	7	38	23	+15	50.00	
Charlotte FC	(United States)	7 July 2021	31 May 2022	17	7	1	9	21	23	−2	41.18	
Sporting Gijón	(Spain)	17 January 2023	15 June 2024	66	24	19	23	74	72	+2	36.36	
Al-Wakrah	(Qatar)	27 June 2024	20 September 2024	7	3	2	2	12	9	+3	42.86	
Real Zaragoza	(Spain)	27 December 2024	16 March 2025	10	1	4	5	11	19	−8	10.00	
Malmö FF	(Sweden)	1 January 2026	26 May 2026	15	6	1	8	23	26	−3	40.00	
Career total				206	84	49	73	301	259	+42	40.78	—

== Honours ==
Independiente del Valle

- Copa Sudamericana: 2019
