= Professor of Jurisprudence (Glasgow) =

Chair of Jurisprudence University of Glasgow
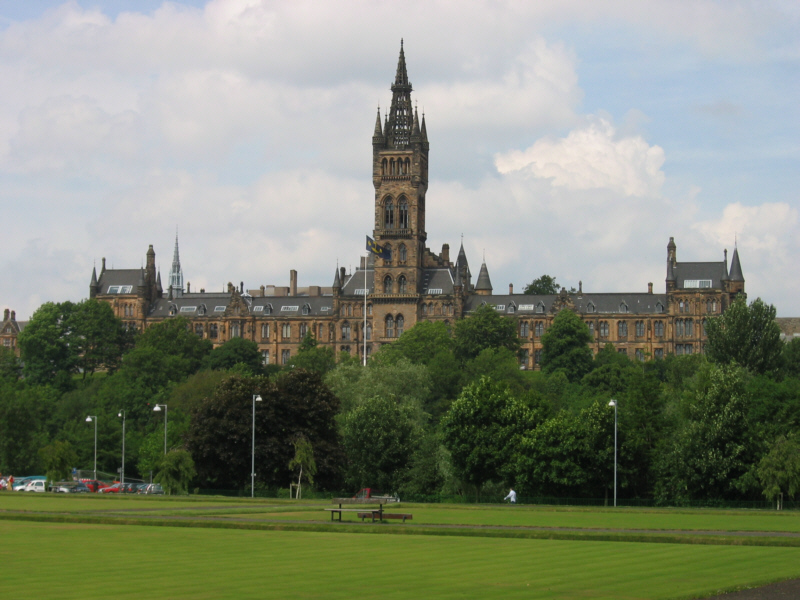
- Incumbent; Emilios Christodoulidis
- Formation: 1952
- First holder: David Walker
- Website: www.law.gla.ac.uk

The Chair of Jurisprudence is a Professorship at the University of Glasgow, founded in 1952.

== History ==
The chair was founded in 1952 and the first holder, David Walker, was appointed in 1954. Walker was himself a graduate of the Faculty of Law and would go on to become a distinguished legal scholar, being appointed Regius Professor of Law in 1958. In 1959, A E Anton was appointed to the chair. Anton was a solicitor, and served on the Scottish Law Commission from 1966 to 1982, was Literary Director of the Stair Society from 1960 to 1966, and was appointed CBE on his retirement from the chair in 1973. In 1978, Tom Campbell was appointed to the chair. Though not a graduate of the School of Law, Campbell was a Glasgow philosophy graduate and had been a Snell Exhibitioner at Balliol College, Oxford. He had then lectured in Social and Political Philosophy at Glasgow whilst writing his PhD, and in 1973 had been appointed Professor of Philosophy at the University of Stirling, before returning to Glasgow in 1978. Campbell left Glasgow in 1990 to become Professor of Law at the Australian National University, where he remained until his retirement in 2001. Scott Veitch was appointed in 1999, having previously lectured at Macquarie University in Sydney, Australia. Veitch is now Paul K C Chung Professor in Jurisprudence at the University of Hong Kong. The most recent holder of the chair was Emilios Christodoulidis.

== Professors of Jurisprudence ==
- 2015 - 2026: Emilios Christodoulidis
- 1978 - 1990: Tom Campbell
- 1959 - 1973: A E Anton
- 1954 - 1958: David Walker

== See also ==
- List of Professorships at the University of Glasgow
- University of Glasgow School of Law
- Regius Chair of Law, Glasgow
