= Professor of Mercantile Law (Glasgow) =

Chair of Mercantile Law University of Glasgow
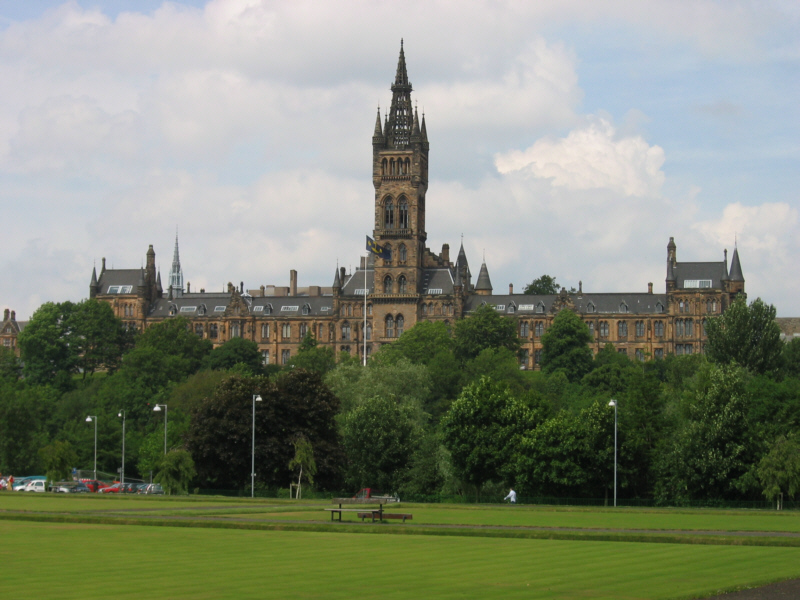
- Incumbent; Vacant since 1993
- Formation: 1919
- First holder: Thomas Wright
- Website: www.law.gla.ac.uk

The Chair of Mercantile Law is a Professorship at the University of Glasgow, founded in 1919. It has had five holders, including politician Sir John Craik-Henderson and Robert Jack, one of Scotland's most noted contemporary commercial lawyers, and has been vacant since 1993.

== History ==
In 1894, a lectureship in Mercantile Law was established at the University, and in 1919 this was made up to a Chair. The first holder, appointed the following year, was Thomas Grieve Wright, a Glasgow solicitor and co-founder of solicitors' firm Smith & Wright, which went on to become Wright, Johnston and MacKenzie LLP. Wright was Dean of the Faculty of Law 1923 to 1925 and resigned from the Chair in 1930, when John Craik-Henderson was appointed. Henderson was a graduate of the University and senior partner in Miller Thompson Henderson and Co., and Dean of the Faculty from 1933 to 1935. He was elected Chairman of the Scottish Unionist Association and in 1940 was returned to Parliament for Leeds North East, at which time he resigned from the Chair.

It was not until 1946 that his successor, John Boyd, was appointed. Boyd, also a graduate of the University, was a partner in Russell & Duncan, and served as Dean of the Faculty of Law from 1947 to 1950, Vice-President of the Law Society of Scotland from 1954 to 1955 and Dean of the Royal Faculty of Procurators in Glasgow in 1955. He resigned from the Chair in 1957, and was awarded an LLD in 1958 and knighted in 1961.

In 1963, James Millar was appointed to the Chair. Another graduate of the University, Millar was a partner in Ramsay, Menzies & Wilson, and had previously been a part-time assistant in Evidence and Procedure and held a part-time lectureship in Administrative Law. He was Dean of the Faculty from 1965 to 1968, and appointed CBE in 1976. He resigned in 1978, when Robert Jack was appointed. Jack was a partner in law firm McGrigor, Donald & Co., and retained this position when appointed to the Chair, being promoted to Senior Partner in 1990. He served on the Scottish Law Commission, Panel on Takeovers and Mergers and the Financial Law Panel, and was appointed CBE in 1988. He served on the Council of the London Stock Exchange after the Guinness share-trading fraud scandal, and pressed MP John Maxton to raise questions in Parliament about the affair in 1997. He retired in 1993, and remains Emeritus Professor. He was awarded an LLD on the University's 550th anniversary celebrations in 2001. The Chair is currently vacant.

== Professors of Mercantile Law ==
- 1978-1993: Robert Jack
- 1963-1978: James Miller
- 1946-1957: Sir John Boyd
- 1930-1940: Sir John Henderson
- 1920-1930: Thomas Wright

== See also ==
- List of Professorships at the University of Glasgow
- University of Glasgow School of Law
- Regius Chair of Law, Glasgow
