= Mary Gordon Calder =

Scottish paleobotanist

- Mary Gordon Calder (circa 1929)
- Born: c. 1906; Uddingston, Scotland
- Died: 1992 (aged 85–86); Milngavie, Scotland
- Education: University of Glasgow
- Scientific career
- Fields: Paleobotany
- Workplaces: University of Glasgow; Westfield College; University of Manchester
- Doctoral advisor: James Drummond; John Walton
- Author abbrev. (botany): Calder

Mary Gordon Calder (c. 1906–1992) was a Scottish paleobotanist. She is known for her work on Carboniferous fossil plants and Jurassic conifers.

== Early years ==
Mary Gordon Calder was born in Uddingston, South Lanarkshire, Scotland to William Calder, a general manager of a warehouse. She contracted poliomyelitis as a child, requiring her to wear leg braces for the rest of her life.

== Life in Glasgow ==
Calder was interested in biological and chemical sciences, and at the age of 18, she entered the University of Glasgow to study botany. Her mother, a reputedly passionate amateur botanist, may have influenced her in this. She graduated in 1929 with honours and went on to work as a researcher in Glasgow. She first pursued her doctorate under James Montagu Frank Drummond (not to be confused with the Australian botanist James Drummond), the then Regius Professor of Botany in the University of Glasgow.

Her first paper was about tomatoes, a choice influenced by Drummond. However, it was not published, as Drummond was replaced as Regius Professor of Botany by John Walton in 1930. Walton, an internationally recognised paleobotanist, encouraged her to study plant fossils, a field Calder herself was interested in. She abandoned her earlier paper on tomatoes and began work on a catalogue of the large collection of coal ball slides by the Scottish paleobotanist Robert Kidston. She published her first paper on Carboniferous scale trees (class Isoetopsida of division Lycopodiophyta) and received her PhD in 1933.

Calder continued working at the University of Glasgow and published several more papers on Carboniferous lycopods in 1933 to 1934. In 1935, she published a paper on petrified pteridosperms (seed ferns) using the revolutionary cellulose peel techniques developed by Walton in 1928. Unlike previous techniques which used thin sections of rock, the cellulose peel method allowed more detail of the fossils to be preserved. She became a lecturer at the university in 1936, allowing her to pursue her own studies.

In 1938, Calder worked on the seed plants Calymmatotheca kidstonii and Samaropsis scotica, both from the Tournaisian age (345.3 to 359.2 million years ago) of the Lower Carboniferous (Mississippian). The two species were later studied further by Albert G. Long in 1959 and emended to Genomosperma kidstonii and Lyrasperma scotica. They became significant as one of the oldest known seed plants discovered with fossilised ovules, providing an important early glimpse into the evolution of reproduction in seed plants.

== Life in London and Manchester ==
In 1940, Calder moved to London and worked as a lecturer in Westfield College (then only admitting women). In 1950 she was appointed as the senior lecturer in paleobotany at the University of Manchester. She succeeded the English botanist William Henry Lang in the post. She published one more paper in 1953 on Araucaria mirabilis, Araucarites sanctaecrucis, and Pararaucaria patagonica; all of which are araucarian conifers from the Middle Jurassic petrified forests of Argentina. She did not publish any more papers during her tenure, possibly because of a difficulty in adjusting to life in Manchester.

She left the University of Manchester in 1964. She officially retired in 1966 to the town of Milngavie in Scotland near Glasgow, where she died in 1992.

== Legacy ==
Calder left a substantial bequest to the University of Glasgow. The funds were used to improve the university's facilities of the Institute of Biomedical and Life Sciences. A plaque in her memory is in the Joseph Black Building.

== See also ==
- Paleobotany
