= Otto Egon Lowenstein =

German zoologist

Otto Egon Lowenstein FRSE (24 October 1906 – 31 January 1999) was a German-born zoologist. He did extensive studies on the labyrinth of the ears of fish.

== Life ==
He was born in Munich on 24 October 1906, to a Jewish family. He studied Sciences at the Ludwig-Maximilians-Universität München. He was taught Zoology by Karl von Frisch. He continued to postgraduate level gaining a PhD in 1932.

In 1933, he left Germany and went to Britain. He began as a research student at the University of Birmingham, gaining a second PhD in 1937. In that year he took a post as Assistant Lecturer in Zoology at the University of Exeter. In 1938, he went to the University of Glasgow as a Lecturer under Prof Edward Hindle. In 1952, he was given a professorship at the University of Birmingham.

He was elected a Fellow of the Royal Society of Edinburgh in 1947. His proposers were Maurice Yonge, Charles Wynford Parsons, John Walton and George Wyburn. In 1955, he was also elected a Fellow of the Royal Society of London.

He retired in 1974. He died on 31 January 1999.

== Family ==
In 1937, he married Elsa Ritter. He secondly married Gunilla Dohlman (d.1981). He finally (aged 80) married Maureen McKernan in 1986.
