= Regius Professor of Anatomy (Glasgow) =

The Regius Chair of Anatomy is a Regius professorship at the University of Glasgow in Scotland.

Founded in 1718 as the Regius Chair of Anatomy and Botany the province of the chair was restricted to anatomy in 1818 when the Regius Chair of Botany was founded.

== Regius Professors of Anatomy and Botany/Regius Professors of Anatomy ==
- Thomas Brisbane, MD (1720)
- Robert Hamilton, MD (1742)
- Joseph Black, MD (1756), Later Professor of the Practice of Medicine
- Thomas Hamilton, MD (1757)
- William Hamilton, MD (1781)
- James Jeffray, MD (1790)
- Allen Thomson, MA MD LLD DCL FRS (1848)
- John Cleland, MA MD FRS (1877)
- Thomas Hastie Bryce, MA MD FRS (1909)
- Duncan MacCallum Blair, MB DSc (1935–1944)
- William James Hamilton, MD DSc (1946)
- George McCreath Wyburn, MB ChB DSc (1948)
- Raymond John Scothorne, BSc MD FRSE (1973–1990)

== See also ==
- List of Professorships at the University of Glasgow
