= William Gloag (legal scholar) =

Scottish lawyer and academic

- Born: 15 March 1865; Edinburgh
- Died: 5 February 1934 (aged 68); Glasgow
- Education: University of Edinburgh, Balliol College, Oxford
- Awards: Regius Chair of Law, Glasgow
- Scientific career
- Fields: Legal scholar
- Workplaces: University of Glasgow

William Murray Gloag KC (15 March 1865 – 5 February 1934) was a Scottish lawyer and academic. His The Law of Contract, first published in 1914, is considered one of the most authoritative texts on Scots contract law. His two immediate successors in the Regius Chair of Law at Glasgow University described him as "the outstanding jurist of the century" and "the most remarkable legal scholar who has ever held this Chair".

== Early life ==
Gloag was born in Edinburgh in 1865, the son of William Ellis Gloag, Lord Kincairney, a Senator of the College of Justice from 1889 to 1905. He was educated at Edinburgh Academy and studied at Balliol College, Oxford, graduating with a first-class degree in modern history in 1888. He then studied at the School of Law of the University of Edinburgh and began practice as an advocate in 1889.

== Career ==
Gloag lectured on Procedure and Evidence at the University of Edinburgh from 1902 until 1905, when he was appointed Regius Professor of Law at the University of Glasgow. He was made a King's Counsel in 1909.

Alan Rodger, in a biographical note, describes him as "an inspired teacher" who "spoke without notes and sprinkled his trenchant remarks with a dry wit". Whilst Regius Professor, he published his two most influential works: Law of Contract (1914) and Introduction to the Law of Scotland with R Candish Henderson (1927). The 13th edition of Gloag and Henderson, as it is known, was published in 2012, with Hector MacQueen as the lead author. Gloag did, John Blackie has observed, "write an awfully large amount of legal literature... the total length of the books in which [he] was sole or joint author with another comes to 2302 pages. There were no word processors. And he was disabled in one arm." (Despite this disability, Gloag was an accomplished golfer who achieved a hole in one at the Senate Match between the Universities of Glasgow and Aberdeen in 1907.)

Whilst Regius Professor, Gloag lived at No. 3 The Square, in the houses which were formerly home to professors of the university. He served as Dean of the Faculty of Law from 1907 to 1909, and established the student Law Society, which continues to exist today. He was appointed King's Counsel in 1909, and was awarded an honorary LLD by the University of Edinburgh in 1915. He died on 5 February 1934.

=== Publications ===
- The Law of Rights in Security, Heritable and Movable, with J M Irvine, 1897
- The Law of Contract: A Treatise on the Principles of Contract in the Law of Scotland, 1914, 2nd edition, 1929
- Carmina Legis: or Verses Illustrative of the Law of Scotland, 1920
- Introduction to the Law of Scotland, with R Candish Henderson, 1927

Academic offices
Preceded by Professor Alexander Stuart	Regius Professor of Law, University of Glasgow; 1905–1934	Succeeded by Professor Andrew Dewar Gibb
