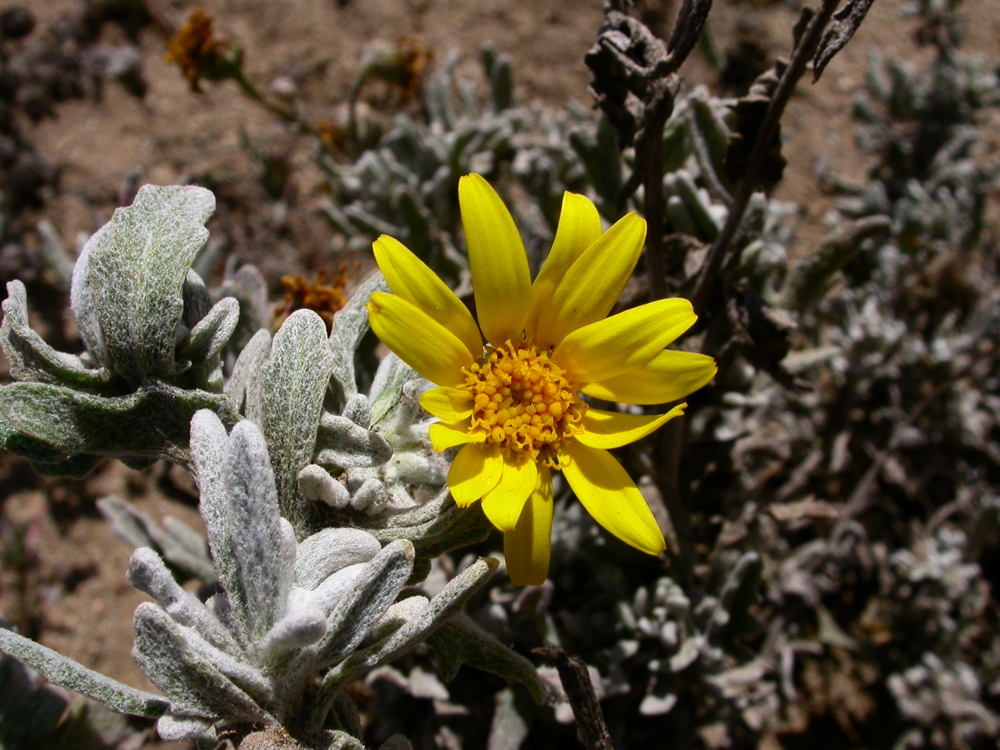

Scientific classification
- Kingdom: Plantae
- Clade: Tracheophytes
- Clade: Angiosperms
- Clade: Eudicots
- Clade: Asterids
- Order: Asterales
- Family: Asteraceae
- Genus: Senecio
- Species: S. brunonianus

Binomial name
- Senecio brunonianus Hook. & Arn. Source: IPNI

= Senecio brunonianus =

Species of flowering plant

Senecio brunonianus is a species of flowering plant in the genus Senecio and family Asteraceae.
