= John Millar Professor of Law =

John Millar Chair of Law University of Glasgow
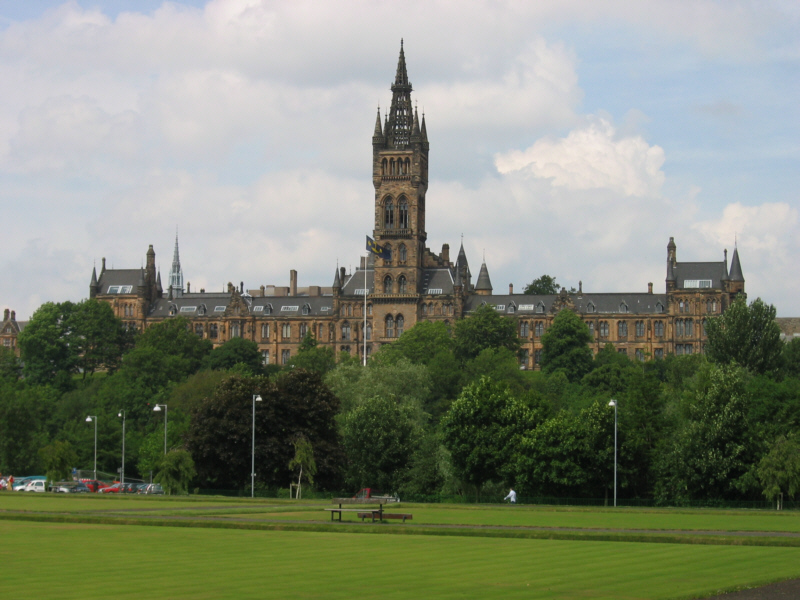
- Incumbent; Adam Tomkins
- Formation: 1985
- First holder: Thomas Bates
- Website: www.law.gla.ac.uk

The John Millar Chair of Law is a Professorship in Law at the University of Glasgow. It was founded in 1985 in honour of John Millar, the Scottish philosopher and Regius Professor of Law at the university from 1761 to 1800.

== History ==
The current holder of the chair is Adam Tomkins, a leading constitutional scholar and noted republican, who has published several widely used textbooks in the areas of Public Law and Law and Government. He was preceded by Tony Prosser, an authority on Public and European Law and now Professor of Public Law at the University of Bristol. Before Prosser, the chair was held by Martin Loughlin, now Professor of Public Law and head of the Department of Law at the London School of Economics.

== Holders ==
- 2003 - Adam Tomkins
- 1992 - Tony Prosser
- 1988 - Martin Loughlin
- 1985 - Thomas Bates

== See also ==
- List of Professorships at the University of Glasgow
- University of Glasgow School of Law
- Regius Chair of Law, Glasgow
