= Adam Tomkins =

British academic and politician (born 1969)

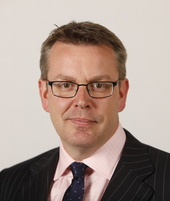
- Tomkins in 2016

Member of the Scottish Parliament for Glasgow (1 of 7 Regional MSPs)
- In office 5 May 2016 – 5 May 2021

Personal details
- Born: 28 June 1969 (age 57) Berkshire, England, United Kingdom
- Party: Scottish Conservatives
- Spouse: Lauren Apfel (2004-2018)
- Relations: Susan Paterson (2021- present)
- Children: 4
- Education: University of East Anglia (LL.B.); London School of Economics (LL.M.)
- Profession: Legal scholar

Adam Tomkins (born 28 June 1969) is a British academic and politician who is the John Millar Professor of Public Law at the University of Glasgow School of Law. A member of the Scottish Conservatives, he was a Member of the Scottish Parliament (MSP) for the Glasgow region from 2016 to 2021, when he stood down for that year's elections.

Previously a constitutional advisor to the House of Lords Constitution Committee, he was made constitutional advisor to the Scotland Office and Secretary of State for Scotland David Mundell in 2015. He was the Convener of the Justice Committee, having previously held the portfolio of strategy, communities, social security, the constitution and equalities.

== Academia ==
Tomkins was educated at Gillingham School, the University of East Anglia (LL.B., 1990) and the London School of Economics (LL.M., 1991). He taught at the School of Law of King's College London between 1991 and 2000 and became a fellow at St Catherine's College, Oxford in 2000, before being elected to the John Millar Chair of Law at Glasgow in 2003. His research interests lie in constitutional theory and history, British, EU and comparative constitutional law.

Tomkins has published seven books in the areas of constitutional, administrative and European Union law, including two, Public Law (2003) and British Government and the Constitution (2007, with Colin Turpin), which are amongst the most widely used by law students in the United Kingdom.

Tomkins has held visiting appointments at the Universities of Toronto, Queensland and New South Wales and the Australian National University, and has lectured throughout the world. In April 2009, Tomkins became associated with Ampersand, a stable at the Faculty of Advocates, as part of its Ampersand Academics link between practitioners and academics. Professor Douglas Brodie, former head of the School of Law at the University of Edinburgh, has also joined this project. In 2009 he was appointed legal adviser to the House of Lords Constitution Committee. He was elected a Fellow of the Royal Society of Edinburgh in 2014.

== Politics ==
During the 2014 Scottish independence referendum, Tomkins was a leading unionist campaigner.

After the referendum Tomkins was one of two Scottish Conservative representatives appointed to the Smith Commission. He has also been appointed as unpaid adviser to Secretary of State for Scotland David Mundell during the passage of the Scotland Bill through parliament.

In August 2015, Tomkins announced his intention to stand as a Member of the Scottish Parliament for the Scottish Conservatives in the 2016 election. In a blog explaining his decision, he was highly critical of the Scottish National Party's actions in government at Holyrood, and praised many policies of the Conservative government at Westminster. He was elected a list member of the Scottish Parliament for the Glasgow Region in the 2016 Scottish Parliament election. He previously sat on the Finance Committee and the Social Security Committee in the Scottish Parliament and then served as the Justice Committee convener. Between 2016 and August 2020, he served on the Scottish Conservatives Shadow Cabinet. On 17 July 2020, Tomkins released a statement announcing his intention to stand down as an MSP at the next election due in May 2021 for personal reasons related to work and family.

In April 2021, Tomkins wrote an article in The Spectator calling for a new law to define when constituent nations of the United Kingdom could hold independence referendums. The call was criticised by the Scottish Greens and SNP.

In 2022, following the mini-budget of Liz Truss and Kwasi Kwarteng, Tomkins said it was "inevitable" that the Conservatives would lose next election. In August 2024, Tomkins revealed to journalists Bernard Ponsonby and Alex Massie, that he had voted for the Labour Party in the 2024 United Kingdom general election, opting to support Scottish Labour candidate Blair McDougall in East Renfrewshire.

== Works ==
From British Library catalogue (Accessed October 2015).

- Understanding human rights. (1996, London: Mansell edited by Conor Gearty and Adam Tomkins)
- The constitution after Scott: government unwrapped (1998)
- Devolution and the British constitution (1998)
- Sceptical essays on human right (2001: edited by Tom Campbell, K.D. Ewing, and Adam Tomkins)
- Public Law (2003)
- Our Republican constitution (2005)
- How We Should Rule Ourselves (2005: Alasdair Gray, Adam Tomkins)
- The executive and public law : power and accountability in comparative perspective (2006: edited by Paul Craig and Adam Tomkins)
- European Union public law : text and materials (2007: Damian Chalmers, Adam Tomkins)
- British government and the constitution: text and materials (2011: Colin Turpin, Adam Tomkins)
- The legal protection of human rights : sceptical essays (2011: edited by Tom Campbell, K.D. Ewing and Adam Tomkins)
