= Duncan Blair =

Duncan Blair may refer to:

- Gordon Blair (politician) (Duncan Gordon Blair, 1919–2006), Canadian lawyer, politician, judge
- Duncan M. Blair (1896–1944), Scottish anatomist
