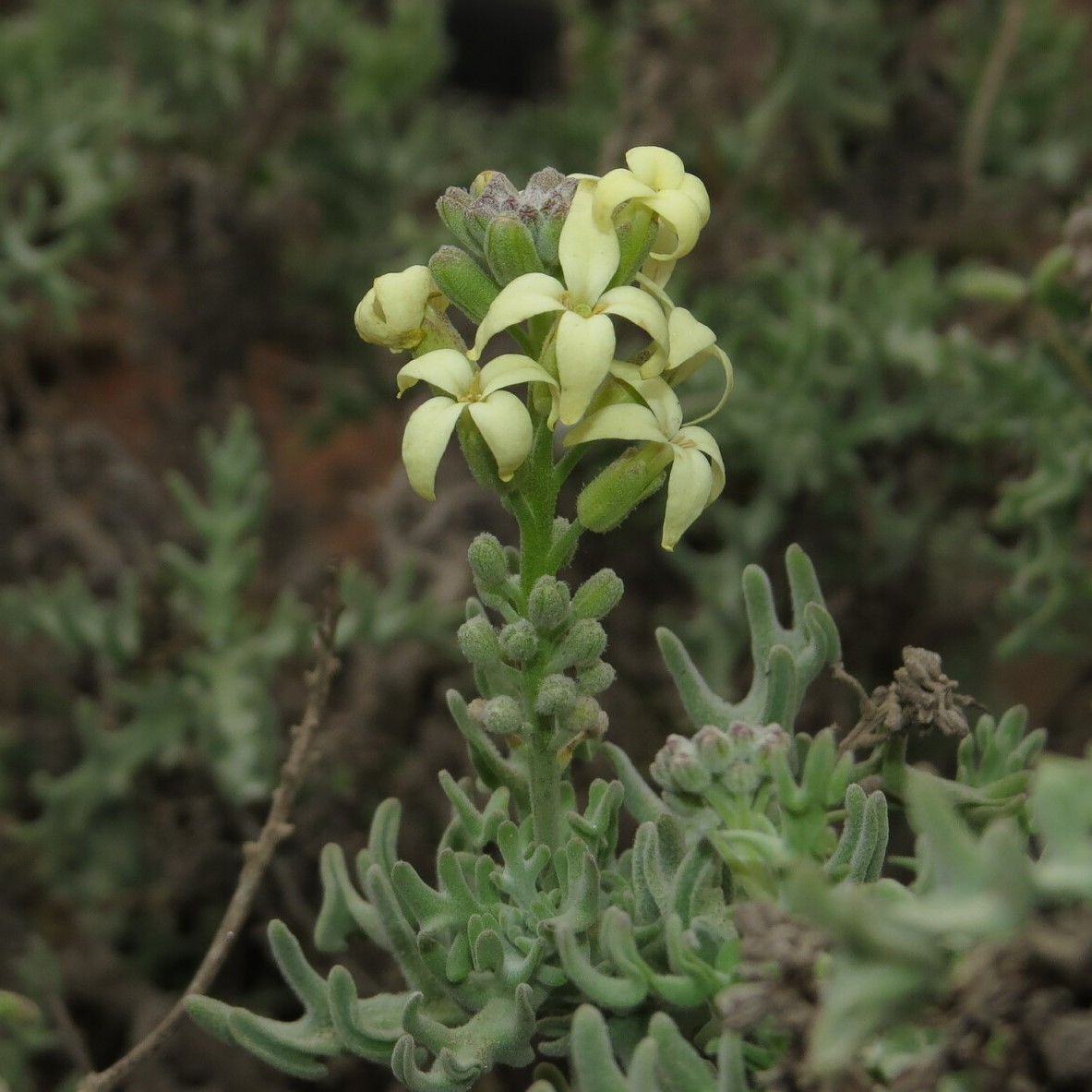
- Mathewsia densifolia

Scientific classification
- Kingdom: Plantae
- Clade: Embryophytes
- Clade: Tracheophytes
- Clade: Spermatophytes
- Clade: Angiosperms
- Clade: Eudicots
- Clade: Rosids
- Order: Brassicales
- Family: Brassicaceae
- Tribe: Schizopetaleae
- Genus: Mathewsia; Hook. & Arn.

= Mathewsia =

Genus of flowering plants

Mathewsia is a genus of flowering plants in the family Brassicaceae. It includes six species native to Peru and northern and central Chile.

== Species ==
Six species are accepted.

- Mathewsia auriculata Phil.
- Mathewsia densifolia Rollins
- Mathewsia foliosa Hook. & Arn.
- Mathewsia incana Phil.
- Mathewsia linearifolia Turcz.
- Mathewsia peruviana O.E.Schulz
