= Joe Thomson =

Scottish lawyer and academic (1948–2018)

- Born: 6 May 1948; Campbeltown
- Died: 12 May 2018 (aged 70)
- Education: University of Edinburgh
- Awards: Regius Chair of Law, Glasgow, FRSE
- Scientific career
- Fields: Legal scholar
- Workplaces: University of Strathclyde, University of Glasgow, Scottish Law Commission

Joseph McGeachy Thomson FRSE (6 May 1948 – 12 May 2018) was a Scottish lawyer and academic. He was Regius Professor of Law at the University of Glasgow and a member of the Scottish Law Commission.

== Early life ==
Thomson was born in Campbeltown and attended the independent Keil School in Dumbarton. He then studied at the University of Edinburgh, where he graduated LLB in 1970 and was awarded the Lord President Cooper Memorial Prize as the outstanding LLB honours graduate.

== Career ==
Following his graduation, Thomson was appointed lecturer at the University of Birmingham, moving in 1974 to King's College London. In 1984, he became Professor of Law at the University of Strathclyde, and in 1991 was appointed to the Regius Chair in Law at the School of Law of the University of Glasgow. He was elected a fellow of the Royal Society of Edinburgh in 1996, and was President of the Society of Public Teachers of Law (now the Society of Legal Scholars) in 2000–2001. He was appointed to a five-year term on the Scottish Law Commission in 2000, and received a further four-year term in 2005, at which point he resigned from the Glasgow Chair. He was formerly editor of the Juridical Review, the oldest Scottish legal journal.

=== Publications ===
- Family Law in Scotland, 1987, 6th ed. 2011 ISBN 978-1847665607
- Delictual Liability, 1994, 4th ed. 2009 ISBN 978-1847663160
- Contract Law in Scotland (with Hector MacQueen), 2000, 3rd ed. 2012 ISBN 978-1847661630
- Scots Private Law, 2006 ISBN 978-0414016569
- Green's Annotated Acts: Damages (Scotland) Act 2011, 2012 ISBN 978-0414018877

Academic offices
Preceded by Professor David Walker	Regius Professor of Law, University of Glasgow; 1991–2005	Succeeded by Professor James Chalmers
