= Peter Temin =

American economist (1937–2025)

- Born: 17 December 1937; Philadelphia, Pennsylvania, U.S.
- Died: 4 August 2025 (aged 87)

Academic background
- Doctoral advisor: Charles P. Kindleberger

Academic work
- Doctoral students: Christina Romer
- Website: Information at IDEAS / RePEc

Peter Temin (/ˈtɛmɪn/; 17 December 1937 – 4 August 2025) was an American economist and economic historian, who served as the Gray Professor of Economics at MIT, where he was once the head of the Economics Department.

== Education ==
Temin was born in Philadelphia and graduated from Swarthmore College in 1959 before earning his Ph.D. at MIT in 1964. Beginning in the 1960s and the early 1970s, he published on American economic history in the 19th century, including The Jacksonian Economy (1969) and Causal Factors in American Economic Growth in the Nineteenth Century (1975), as well as Reckoning with Slavery (1976), which was an examination of the slave economy and its effects. His papers of the 1960s would reflect intense empirical study as part of his working method, including composition of iron and steel products, which would later be part of his analysis of industrial development. He continued his study of 19th century industrialization with Engines of Enterprise.

== Influence ==
In a 1971 Journal of Economic History article, Temin used general-equilibrium analysis to examine three problems: labor scarcity in America, the Great Depression, and late-nineteenth-century deflation. He would apply the conclusions drawn to his study of the business cycle in the 19th century.

Temin challenged accounts of the Great Depression centered on monetary policy, giving greater weight to the gold standard and falling consumer spending. He would later revisit the thesis in his 1989 work Lessons from the Great Depression and publish several papers that built on his conclusions. He joined, in some way, the conclusions of Keynes and Friedman: the Great Depression started with troubles in the 'real economy that later expanded to the financial world via speculation and money destruction (also see the analysis of Rondo Cameron about 'wildcat banking').

Cambridge University Press published The Fall of the Bell System, a study of AT&T's divestiture by Peter Temin and Louis Galambos, in 1987.

== Personal life and death ==
Temin's older brother, Howard, was a geneticist and virologist who shared the 1975 Nobel Prize in medicine. He was Jewish. Temin died on 4 August 2025, at the age of 87.

== Selected publications ==
- Iron and Steel in Nineteenth Century America: An Economic Inquiry. Cambridge: M.I.T. Press, 1964.
- The Jacksonian Economy. New York: W.W. Norton, 1969.
- The New Economic History (ed.). Penguin Books, 1972.
- Causal Factors in American Economic Growth in the Nineteenth Century. London: Macmillan, 1975.
- Did Monetary Forces Cause the Great Depression? New York: W.W. Norton, 1976.
- Reckoning with Slavery. New York: Oxford University Press, 1976 (with Paul David, Herbert Gutman, Richard Sutch, and Gavin Wright).
- Taking Your Medicine: Drug Regulation in the United States. Cambridge: Harvard University Press, 1980.
- The Fall of The Bell System: A Study in Prices and Politics. New York: Cambridge University Press, 1987.
- Lessons from the Great Depression. MIT Press. 1991 [1989]. ISBN 9780262700443.
- Inside the Business Enterprise: Historical Perspectives on the Use of Information (ed.). Chicago: University of Chicago Press, 1991.
- Industrialization in North America (ed.), Vol. 6 of R. A. Church and E. A. Wrigley (eds.), The Industrial Revolutions. Oxford: Blackwell, 1994.
- The European Economy Between the Wars. Oxford: Oxford University Press, 1997 (with Charles Feinstein and Gianni Toniolo), translated into Italian as L'economia europea tra le due guerre (Laterza, Roma-Bari 1998).
- Learning by Doing in Markets, Firms, and Nations (eds.). Chicago: University of Chicago Press, 1998 (with Naomi R. Lamoreaux and Daniel M. G. Raff).
- Elites, Minorities, and Economic Growth (eds.). Amsterdam: Elsevier, 1999 (with Elise S. Brezis).
- Engines of Enterprise: An Economic History of New England (ed.). Cambridge: Harvard University Press, 2000.
- The World Economy Between the Wars. Oxford: Oxford University Press, 2007 (with [Charles Feinstein and] Gianni Toniolo).
- Reasonable Rx: How to Lower Drug Prices. FT Press, 2008 (with Stan Finkelstein).
- The Roman Market Economy. Princeton University Press. 2013 [2012]. ISBN 978-0-691-14768-0.
- Prometheus Shackled: Goldsmith Banks and England's Financial Revolution after 1700, Oxford University Press, USA, 2013 (with Hans-Joachim Voth).
- The Leaderless Economy: Why the World Economic System Fell Apart and How to Fix It, Princeton University Press, 2013 (with David Vines).
- Keynes: Useful Economics for the World Economy, co-author David Vines, MIT Press (2014)
- The Vanishing Middle Class: Prejudice and Power in a Dual Economy, MIT Press (March 2017) ISBN 9780262339971
