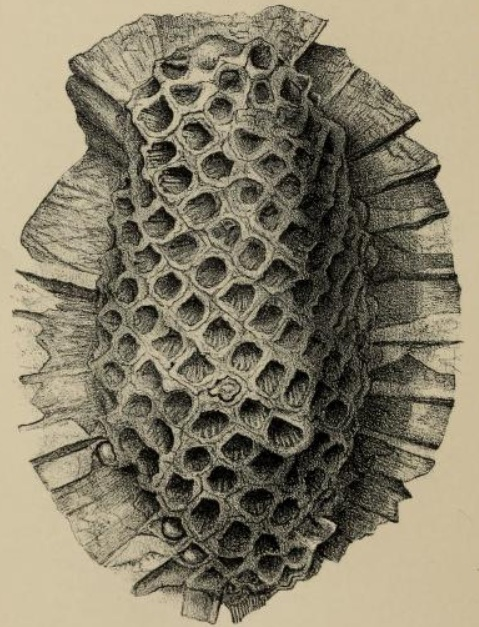
- Lithograph of the holotype specimen of Araucarites ooliticum

Scientific classification
- Kingdom: Plantae
- Clade: Embryophytes
- Clade: Tracheophytes
- Clade: Spermatophytes
- Clade: Gymnospermae
- Division: Pinophyta
- Class: Pinopsida
- Order: Araucariales
- Family: Araucariaceae
- Genus: †Araucarites; Presl 1838

Synonyms
- Kaidacarpum Carruthers, 1868

= Araucarites =

Araucarites Temporal range: Permian to Eocene ~290–49 Ma

Extinct genus of conifer

Araucarites is an extinct genus of conifer, used to refer to female conifer cones and cone scales that resemble those of the family Araucariaceae. Species assigned to the genus (which may not all belong to Araucariaceae) lived in the Permian to Eocene and have been found worldwide.

== Species ==
A number of species have been described in Araucarites.

A. aquiensis
A. cutchensis
A. goepperti
A. ooliticum (Carruthers 1868) Great Oolite Group, Middle Jurassic, England (originally assumed to be a screw pine (Pandanus), and described as Kaidacarpum ooliticum Carruthers 1868 renamed Pandanocarpum ooliticum Zigno (1873) comb nov., assigned to Araucarites by Seward in 1917)
A. pachacuteci
A. selseyensis
A. stockeyi
A. sanctaecrucis
