= Ronald MacDonald (economist) =

British economist

Ronald MacDonald OBE
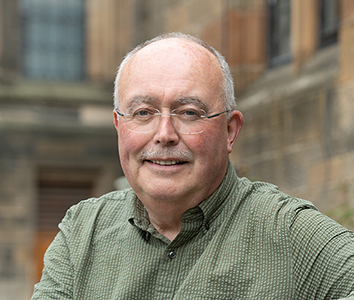
- MacDonald at the Adam Smith Business School, University of Glasgow
- Born: Scotland

Academic background
- Education: University of Manchester (PhD, M.A.); Heriot-Watt University (B.A.)

Academic work
- Discipline: International Finance; International Economics; International Trade; Macroeconomics; Exchange rates Monetary Policy; Central Bank; Econometrics; Economic History
- School or tradition: Adam Smith Business School
- Institutions: Adam Smith Business School, University of Glasgow
- Notable ideas: Behavioural Equilibrium Exchange Rate Model
- Website: Information at IDEAS / RePEc

Ronald MacDonald OBE was born in the West End of Glasgow in 1955, to Duncan and Effie MacDonald (née Macrae) and spent his formative years in Glasgow, Fort William and Falkirk. He attended Tinto Road Primary School, Glasgow, Corpach Primary School, Fort William, Comely Bank Primary School, Falkirk, and Falkirk High School, with a gap year in Portree primary and High School, before progressing to his university education. He is a Scottish economist with interests in a wide range of topics in International Finance and Macroeconomics and a considerable amount of his research focuses on the economics of exchange rates and currency regime choice. He is currently Research Professor of Macroeconomics and International Finance at the Adam Smith Business School in the University of Glasgow.

He was appointed Officer of the Order of the British Empire (OBE) in the 2015 Birthday Honours "for services to Economic Policy."

== Tertiary Education and career ==
=== Qualifications and appointments ===
MacDonald holds a first class B.A. (Hons) degree from Heriot-Watt University, M.A. (Econ) and PhD from the University of Manchester. He has previously held the Robert Fleming Chair of Investment and Finance at the University of Dundee (1989–1992), Professor of International Finance at the University of Strathclyde from 1992 (formerly Professor of International Macroeconomics), the Bonar Macfie Chair of Economics, 2005–2006, Department of Economics University of Glasgow and the Adam Smith Professor of Political Economy at the Adam Smith Business School in the University of Glasgow from January 2006 – 2015. He has been a visiting professor at the University of New South Wales, Australia, Queen's University, Canada, European University Institute, Florence, University of Cergy-Pontoise, Paris, ZEW, Mannheim, and Centre for Economic Studies, Munich.

=== Timeline ===
(1975 to 1978) BA, with First class Honours, in Economics at Heriot-Watt University

(1978 to 1979) MA(Econ) in economics at the University of Manchester

(1979 to 1982) PhD in economics at the University of Manchester

(1982 to 1984) Midland Bank Fellow in Monetary Economics at Loughborough University

(1984 to 1989) Lecturer and Senior Lecturer at the University of Aberdeen

(1989 to 1992) Robert Fleming Professor of Finance and Investment at the University of Dundee

(1992 to 2004) Professor of International Finance at the University of Strathclyde, formerly Professor of International Macroeconomics

(2005 to 2006) Bonar MacFie Chair of Economics University of Glasgow

(2006 to 2015) Adam Smith Professor of Political Economy at the Adam Smith School of Economics and Finance in the University of Glasgow

(2015 to present) Research Professor of Macroeconomics and International Finance at the Adam Smith Business School in the University of Glasgow.

=== Research ranking and grants ===
==== Research ranking ====
MacDonald has consistently been ranked amongst the top 1% of economists in the world by the IDEAS/RePEc ranking, and amongst the top 1% of all research in international finance and open economy macroeconomics. He ranks amongst the top 6% of SSRN Top Economics authors. With a wide range of interests focused around exchange rates through to macroeconomics and international finance, he has published over 130 articles in peer-reviewed journals and authored or edited over 15 books. He has over 18,000 citations to his work recorded on Google Scholar

==== Fellowships and grants ====
MacDonald is an International Fellow at the Kiel Institute of Economics, and Research Fellow of the CESifo Research Network Munich and was a Fellow of the Royal Society of Edinburgh from 2002 to 2014. Since 1996 he has been involved in successful Research Grant applications totalling over £2,000,000.

== Academic research ==
=== Current research ===
MacDonald's current research interests span a range of topics in Macroeconomics (i.e. optimal monetary policy and the monetary transmission process; the role of FDIs, exchange rate misalignment, capital flows and corruption on economic growth; the sustainability of fiscal policy), International Finance (i.e. the determination of exchange rates and exchange rate forecasting; equilibrium exchange rate issues) and Finance (i.e. the determination of stock and bond prices and the term structure of interest rates).

=== The Behavioural Equilibrium Exchange Rate Model ===
MacDonald's research on exchange rate modelling has been highly influential with many implications for policy-markers. The Behavioural Equilibrium Exchange Rate (BEER), developed jointly with Peter Clark at the International Monetary Fund, has been widely applied by central banks and financial researchers to assess the extent of mis-alignment between major world currencies. the BEER approach has been widely used by central banks, financial institutions and government agencies to determine the so-called Fair Value of currencies and MacDonald was commissioned by the European Commission to apply the BEER approach to advise on the final lockdown Fair Value rates of the Euro Zone currencies. In terms of policy-based research, he has proposed phasing out the Barnett Formula in favour of fiscal autonomy in the Scottish Parliament.

== Non-academic positions ==
As a prominent figure in economic academia, MacDonald has held posts as Consultant Researcher and Visiting Scholar at the International Monetary Fund on fourteen separate occasions, a Monetary Advisor to the Fund and the World Bank, an advisor to the UK Audit Office, and has presented his five-day course on the 'Economics of Exchange Rates' at the International Monetary Fund Institute., the Austrian Central Bank, the Monetary Authority of Singapore, the Reserve Bank of New Zealand, the Norwegian Central Bank and numerous private sector Institutions, including Credit Suisse First Boston, the Royal Bank of Scotland, the Maltese Tourism Office. He has, furthermore, acted as a consultant to a wide range of Central Banks, International Banks, and other financial institutions and private sector industry, including European Commission and the European Central Bank and the Qatari Secretairiat of Planning .

MacDonald has also served as a member of the executive committee of the Scottish Doctoral Programme, Member of Council of the Scottish Economic Society, and was one of the founding directors (in macroeconomics) of the Scottish Institute for Research in Economics (SIRE), which resulted in a significant funding uplift for economics in Scotland from the Scottish Funding Council. He has acted as an expert witness to various committees of the Scottish Parliament, the House of Commons Scottish Affairs Committee and the House of Lords Economic Affairs Committee. He was a Fellow of the Royal Society of Edinburgh from 2002 until his resignation in 2014. Additionally, he has held a number of voluntary positions, including the Chair of the Portree and Braes community Trust, a Director of the Skye and Lochalsh Citizens Advice Bureaux, chair and cofounder of SkyeLab CIC, and Community Chair of the Centre of Excellence Work-stream of the Sir Lewis Ritchie Steering Group. He was elected to the Highland Council in 2017 as an independent Councillor. MacDonald is also a semi professional landscape photographer and with his wife Catriona has run An t-Eilean Gallery, a fine art photography gallery, in Portree, Skye (ronaldmacdonaldphotography.com) since 2010. He has also been a keen musician since his teens playing guitar in a number of Jazz Rock bands, such as Flyer, in the central belt of Scotland, and Sidewinder in the North West of England. In 2022 he self released a solo album called Time Stands Still.

== Publications ==
=== Books ===
- MacDonald, R. (1988). Floating Exchange Rates: Theories and Evidence. Published by Routledge: Taylor and Francis Group. ISBN 0043381340, 978-0043381342
- MacDonald, R., and Taylor, M.P. (1989). Exchange Rates and Open Economy Macroeconomics. ISBN 0631162380, 978-0631162384
- MacDonald, R., and Stein, J.L. (1999). Equilibrium Exchange Rates. Published by Springer. ISBN 978-0-7923-8424-3, 978-94-010-5896-4
- MacDonald, R., and Marsh. (1999). Exchange Rate Modelling. Published by Springer ISBN 978-0-7923-8668-1, 978-1-4419-5113-7
- MacDonald, R., and Hallwood, C.P. (2000). International Money and Finance (3rd Edition). Published by Wiley-Blackwell. ISBN 0631204628, 978-0631204626
- MacDonald, R. (2007). Exchange Rate Economics: Theory and Evidence ISBN 0415125510, 978-0415125512
- MacDonald, R. (2010). Exchange Rate Economics – Selected Essays. Published by Edward Elgar. ISBN 184376198X, 978-1843761983

=== Papers ===
- MacDonald, R., and Taylor, M.P. (1992). Exchange Rate Economics. Published by the LSE Centre for Labour Economics.
- MacDonald, R. (1995). Long-Run Exchange Rate Modelling: A Survey of the Recent Evidence. Published by the International Monetary Fund Research Department.
- MacDonald, R. (1997). Expectations Formation and Risk in Three Financial Markets: Surveying What the Surveys Say.
- MacDonald, R., and Chionis, D. (1997). Aggregate and Disaggregate Measures of the Foreign Exchange Risk Premium.
- MacDonald, R., and Myrvin, A. (1997). On the Mean-Reverting Properties of Target Zone Exchange Rates: Some Evidence from the ERM.
- MacDonald, R., and La Cour, L. (1997). Modelling the ECU Against the Dollar: A Structural Monetary Interpretation.
- MacDonald, R., and Clark, P.B. (2000). Filtering the BEER: A Permanent and Transitory Decomposition. Published by the International Monetary Fund Research Department
- MacDonald, R., and Hallwood, P. (2009). The Political Economy of Financing Scottish Government: Considering a New Constitutional Settlement for Scotland.
