= David Vines =

Australian economist

David Anthony Vines
- Born: 8 May 1949 (age 77); Oxford, England

Academic background
- Education: Scotch College, Melbourne, University of Melbourne, and Cambridge University
- Influences: John Maynard Keynes, James Meade
- Website: Information at IDEAS / RePEc

David Anthony Vines (born 8 May 1949), is an Australian economist teaching at Oxford University.

== Career ==
Vines is currently a professor of economics at Oxford University and a Fellow of Balliol College and is the director of the Centre for International Macroeconomics at Oxford.

He is also an adjunct professor in the Centre for Applied Macroeconomic Analysis at the Australian National University, a research fellow of the Centre for Economic Policy Research in London and scientific coordinator of the European Union Framework Seven PEGGED Research Programme on the Politics and Economics of Global Governance: the European Dimension. From 1994 to 2000 he was the director of the Research Programme on Global Economic Institutions of the Economic and Social Research Council.

He is a trustee of the Oxford Policy Institute. He formerly held the Adam Smith Chair of Political Economy at the University of Glasgow and in 2002 was a Houblon-Norman Senior Fellow at the Bank of England.

Vines was educated at Scotch College, Melbourne, the University of Melbourne, and at Cambridge University.

At Cambridge, Vines worked with Nobel Prize-winning economist, James Meade, who was deeply influenced by John Maynard Keynes. Vines' work on macroeconomics reflects the influence of both of these men. His work spans international macroeconomics, the reform of international financial architecture and monetary economics.

== Personal life ==
Vines is married to Jane Bingham. He was born in Oxford, in 1949, when his Australian father was a research student in chemistry at Lincoln College. He grew up in Australia. He has three sons and two stepsons.

== Publications ==
- Peter Temin & David Vines. Keynes: Useful Economics for the World Economy. MIT Press, 2014.

=== As editor ===
- 1998: Integrity in the Public and Private Domains co-edited with Alan Montefiore (London: Routledge) ISBN 0-415-18031-7
- 1999: The Asian Financial Crisis: Causes, Contagion, and Consequences co-edited with Pierre-Richard Agenor, Marcus Miller, & Axel A. Weber (Cambridge: Cambridge University Press) ISBN 0-521-77080-7
- 2004: The IMF and its Critics: Reform of Global Financial Architecture co-edited with Christopher L. Gilbert (Cambridge: Cambridge University Press) ISBN 0-521-82154-1
