= William Gloag, Lord Kincairney =

Scottish judge (1828–1909)

William Gloag
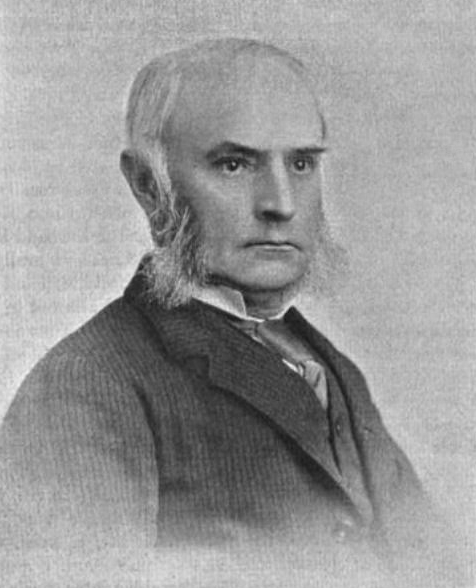
- Born: William Ellis Gloag; 7 February 1828; Perth, Scotland
- Died: 8 October 1909 (aged 81); Kincairney, Perth and Kinross, Scotland
- Education: University of Edinburgh
- Occupation: Judge
- Spouse: Helen Burn (m. 1864)
- Children: 4, including William Murray Gloag
- Relatives: Paton James Gloag (brother)

William Ellis Gloag, Lord Kincairney (7 February 1828 – 8 October 1909) was a Scottish judge.

== Life ==
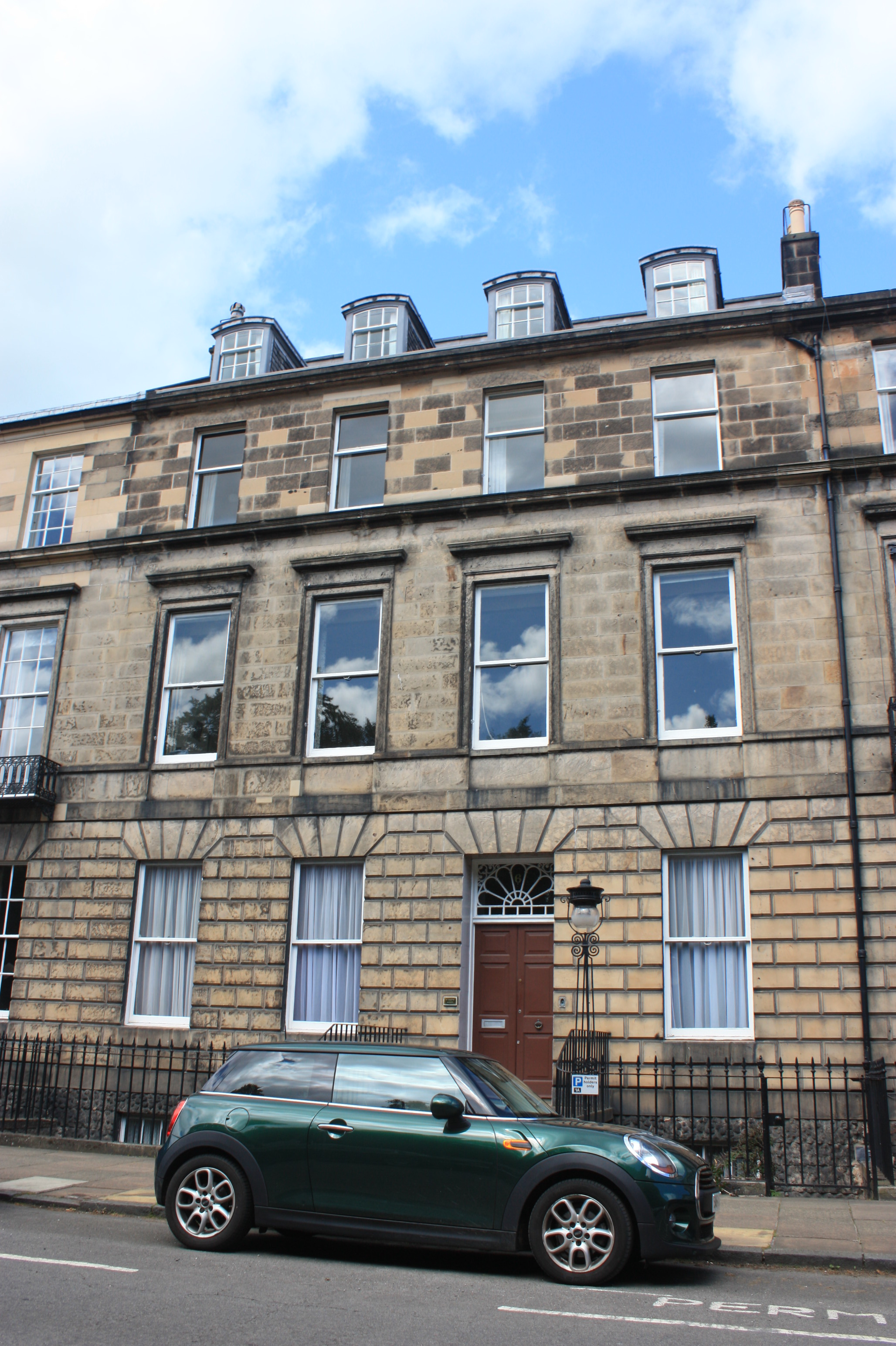
6 Heriot Row, Edinburgh

Gloag was born in Perth on 7 February 1828 to Jessie (née Burn), daughter of John Burn, Writer to the Signet, and William Gloag, a banker in Perth. Paton James Gloag the theologian writer and Moderator of the General Assembly of the Church of Scotland in 1889, was his eldest brother, and his eldest sister was Jessie Burn Gloag, who founded a ragged school in Perth.

Gloag was educated at Perth grammar school and the University of Edinburgh. He passed the Scottish bar on 25 December 1853, where he enjoyed a fair practice. A Conservative in politics, he was not offered promotion until 1874, when he was appointed advocate depute on the formation of Disraeli's second ministry.

In 1877, Gloag became Sheriff of Stirling and Dumbarton, and in 1885 Sheriff of Perthshire. In 1889, he was raised to the bench, when he took the title of Lord Kincairney.

In later life he owned a large Georgian townhouse at 6 Heriot Row, Edinburgh which had previously been the home of the author Henry Mackenzie.

He died at Kincairney on 8 October 1909, and was buried at Caputh. He is also memorialised on his brother Paton's grave in Dunning.

== Family ==
In 1864, Gloag married Helen, daughter of James Burn, Writer to the Signet. Together they had three daughters and a son, William Murray Gloag.

== Works ==
- Introduction to the Law of Scotland, Green, 1995

== Notes ==
Attribution

- This article incorporates text from a publication now in the public domain: Lee, Sidney, ed. (1912). "Gloag, William Ellis". Dictionary of National Biography (2nd supplement). Vol. 2. London: Smith, Elder & Co.

== Sources ==
- Rodger, A. F. "Gloag, William Murray (1865–1934)". Oxford Dictionary of National Biography (online ed.). Oxford University Press. doi:10.1093/ref:odnb/37461. (Subscription, Wikipedia Library access or UK public library membership required.)
