= List of professorships at the University of Glasgow =

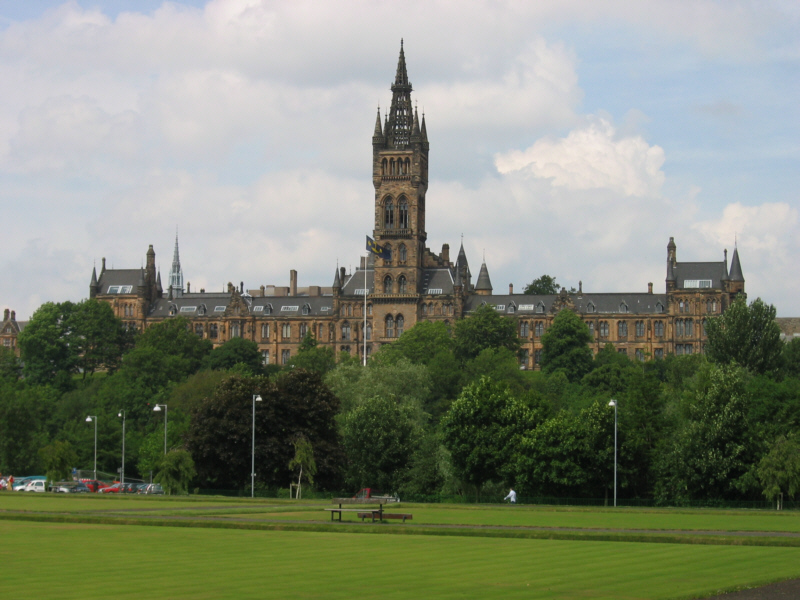
University of Glasgow

Professorships at the University of Glasgow can take either of two forms: an established chair or a personal professorship. An established chair is one which has been set up by endowment and is intended to last indefinitely, i.e. that when a chair is vacated, someone else will be appointed to it. Personal professorships are conferred on individuals and exist only so long as that individual continues to hold the post. While the first established chair at the university was created in 1637, personal professorships were first created by the university in 1964 to facilitate more flexibility in appointment. No difference in status is drawn between holders of established or personal professorships, and all are accorded ex-officio membership of the Academic Senate.

The following is an incomplete list of established professorships at the University of Glasgow, organised by college. The title of the professorship is followed by the date of foundation. Dates in italics indicate the year of foundation of lectureships on which chairs were based.

== Arts ==
- Professor of Divinity (1640)
- Professor of Humanity (1682) (1618)
- MacDowell Professor of Greek (1704) (1581)
- Professor of Hebrew and Semitic Languages (1709)
- Professor of Logic and Rhetoric (1727)
- Professor of Moral Philosophy (1727)
- Professor of Ecclesiastical History (1716) (Until 1935 Regius Professorship)
- Professor of Divinity and Biblical Criticism (1861)
- Regius Professor of English Language and Literature (1861)
- Professor of Modern History (1893)
- Professor of Scottish History and Literature (1913)
- Marshall Professor of French Language and Literature (1917)(1895)
- Stevenson Professor of Hispanic Studies (1924)
- Stevenson Professor of Italian (1924)
- Gardiner Professor of Music (1928)
- Professor of Christian Ethics and Practical Theology (1939-1945)
- Professor of English Language (1947) (1907)
- Edwards Professor of Medieval History (1955)
- Professor of Celtic (1956)
- Bradley Professor of English Literature (1965)
- Richmond Professor of Fine Art (1965)
- Stevenson Professor of French Language and Literature (1966)
- Dalrymple Professor of Archaeology (1972)
- James Arnott Professor of Drama (1972)
- Professor German Language and Literature (1973)
- Denis Brogan Professor of American History (2001)
- Frances Hutcheson Professor of the Arts (2001)
- Chair of Gaelic (2010)
- William Jacks Chair in Modern Languages (2010)

== Medical, Veterinary and Life Sciences ==
=== Medicine ===
- Regius Professor of Medicine and Therapeutics (1637)
- Regius Professor of Obstetrics and Gynaecology (1815)
- Regius Professor of Surgery (1815)
- Regius Professor of Materia Medica (1831) (1766) (merged with the
  Regius Professor of Medicine and Therapeutics in 1989)
- Regius Professor of Forensic Medicine (1839)
- Professor of Clinical Medicine (1874)
- Professor of Clinical Surgery (1874)
- Professor of Pathology (1893)
- Muirhead Professor of Medicine (1911)
- Muirhead Professor of Obstetrics and Gynaecology (1911)
- Gardiner Professor of Immunology (1919)
- Samson Gemmell Professor of Child Health (1924)
- Professor of Administrative Medicine (1960-1981)
- MacFarlane Professor of Experimental Medicine (1962)
- David Cargill Professor Geriatric Medicine (1964)
- Professor of Anaesthesia, Pain and Critical Care (1965)
- Professor of Dermatology (1965)
- Professor of Clinical Physics (1973)
- Norie-Miller Professor of General Practice (1974)
- Professor of Child and Adolescent Psychiatry (1977)
- Rank Professor of Human Nutrition (1988)
- Nuffield Professor of Community Care Studies (1992)
- Professor of Clinical Psychology (1994)
- Professor of Clinical Neuropsychology (1999)
- Professor of Learning Disabilities (1999)

==== Dentistry ====
- Professor of Oral Surgery (1951)
- Professor of Dental Prosthetics (1959)
- Professor of Dental Primary Care (1971)

=== Veterinary Medicine ===
- Professor of Equine Clinical Studies (1956)

=== Life Sciences ===
- Regius Professor of Anatomy (1718)
- Regius Professor of Zoology (1807)
- Regius Professor of Botany (1818)
- Regius Professor of Physiology (1839)
- Gardiner Professor of Biochemistry (1919)
- Professor of Applied Physiology (1948-1965)
- Cathcart Professor of Biochemistry (1965)
- Hooker Professor of Botany (1965)
- Professor of Cell Biology (1965)
- Robertson Professor of Biotechnology (1988)

== Science and Engineering ==
=== Physical Sciences ===
- Professor of Natural Philosophy (1727)
- Regius Professor of Astronomy (1760)
- Regius Professor of Chemistry (1817) (1747)
- Professor of Geology (1903)
- James S Dixon Professor of Applied Geology (1907) (1902)
- Gardiner Professor of Chemistry (1919) (1898)
- Cargill Professor of Natural Philosophy (1920)
- Joseph Black Professor of Chemistry (1961-1967)
- Ramsay Professor of Chemistry (1966)
- Professor of Astrophysics (1984-1996)

=== Information and Mathematical Sciences ===
- Professor of Mathematics (1691)
- Professor of Biostatistics/Biometrics (1997)

=== Engineering ===
- Regius Professor of Civil Engineering and Mechanics (1840)
- John Elder Professor of Naval Architecture and Ocean Engineering (1883)
- James Watt Professor of Electrical Engineering (1921) (1898)
- Mechan Professor of Engineering (1948)
- Cormack Professor of Civil Engineering (1965)
- Professor of Electronic Systems (1983)
- Shoda Professor of Aerospace Systems (1995)
- Professor of Applied Dynamics (1997)
- Wolfson Professor of Bioengineering (2008)

== Social Sciences ==
=== Business ===
- Adam Smith Chair of Political Economy (1896)(1892)
- Johnstone Smith Professor of Accountancy (1925)
- Alec Cairncross Chair of Applied Economics (1949)
- Bonar-Macfie Chair of Political Economy (1962)
- Professor of Business Policy (1974)
- Ernst & Young Professor of Accounting (1986)
- Professor of Marketing (1996)

=== Education ===
- Professor of Education (1949) (1984)

=== Law ===
- Regius Chair of Law (1712)
- Chair of Conveyancing (1861)
- Chair of Mercantile Law (1918) (1894)
- Douglas Chair of Civil Law (1948)
- Chair of Jurisprudence (1952) (1878)
- Jean Monnet Chair of European Law (1972)
- Alexander Stone Chair of Commercial Law (1985)
- John Millar Chair of Law (1985)
- International Bar Association Chair of Law and Ethics in Medicine (1990)
- Chair of Banking Law (1997)

=== Social Sciences ===
- James Bryce Chair of Politics (1965)
- Chair of Business History (1988)
- Chair of Housing and Urban Studies (1988)
- Chair of Environmental Economics (2000)
- Chair of Disability Research (1996)

== Miscellaneous ==
- Professor of Agriculture (1954)
- Professor of Architecture (1965), based in Mackintosh School of Architecture
- Hannah Chair (1970), held by the Director of the Hannah Dairy Research Institute
