= Araucarites sanctaecrucis =

Araucarites sanctaecrucis Temporal range: Bathonian-Oxfordian ~164.7–155.7 Ma

Scientific classification
- Kingdom: Plantae
- Clade: Tracheophytes
- Clade: Gymnospermae
- Division: Pinophyta
- Class: Pinopsida
- Order: Araucariales
- Family: Araucariaceae
- Genus: †Araucarites
- Species: †A. sanctaecrucis

Binomial name
- †Araucarites sanctaecrucis Calder
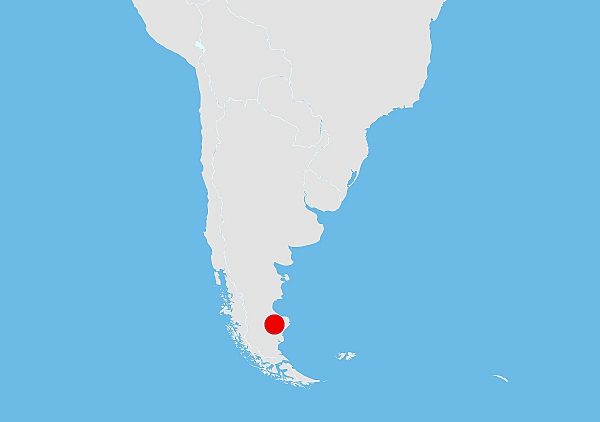
- Location of the Cerro Cuadrado Petrified Forest in Patagonia, Argentina

Synonyms
- Araucarites ? Spegazzini (in partim); Proaraucaria mirabilis (Speg.) Wieland (in partim)

Extinct species of conifer

Araucarites sanctaecrucis is an extinct coniferous tree from Patagonia, Argentina. Its exact affinities are unknown and it is currently assigned to the form genus Araucarites of the family Araucariaceae. A. sanctaecrucis are known from petrified fossils of branches, foliage, and cones from the Cerro Cuadrado Petrified Forest.

== Description ==
The branches of A. sanctaecrucis were woody and symmetrical, approximately 5 to 25 mm (0.20 to 0.98 in) in diameter. Axillary branches are sometimes present in single or double rows at the sides. One side of the recovered detached branches are almost always severely weathered. This is believed to have been the surface facing upwards as it laid on the forest floor.

The leaves were evergreen and arranged spirally. They were flattened against each other (appressed) and scale-like (imbricate). They were rhomboidal in shape, 8 to 14 mm (0.31 to 0.55 in) long and 4 to 8 mm (0.16 to 0.31 in) at its widest. They tapered gradually into a distal subacute point. The undersides of the leaves (abaxial surface) sometimes exhibited parallel longitudinal ridges and grooves. The free part of the lamina (the leaf blade) was about half the length of the leaves.

These fossils are found together with two types of highly distinctive cones (presumed to be female) that show affinities to both Araucariaceae and Cupressaceae (cypresses). However, they have not been described.

== Taxonomy ==
A. sanctaecrucis is classified in the genus Araucarites of the family Araucariaceae. The genus is a form taxon, and is reserved for specimens of possible members of the genus Araucaria, but due to various reasons can not be identified with much confidence. They were described by the Scottish paleobotanist Mary Gordon Calder in 1953.

The genus name, like that of Araucaria, is derived from the Spanish exonym Araucanos ("from Arauco"), referring to the Mapuche people of Chile and Argentina who live in the surviving forests of Araucaria today. The specific name is a Latinized form of "Santa Cruz", the Argentinean province from which the Cerro Cuadrado Petrified Forest is found.

== Paleoecology ==
The dominant species of the forests A. sanctaecrucis are found is Araucaria mirabilis. Pararaucaria patagonica, another conifer, is also found in the area.

== Distribution and geologic time range ==
The Cerro Cuadrado Petrified Forest is part of the La Matilde Formation, dated to the Bathonian to Oxfordian ages (164.7 to 155.7 million years ago) of the Middle to Upper Jurassic. The area was once part of the subtropical and temperate regions of the southern supercontinent Gondwana in the Mesozoic era, a more or less continuous landmass consisting of what is now modern South America, Africa, Antarctica, Australia, New Zealand, and New Guinea.

== See also ==
- Paleobotany
- Araucarioxylon arizonicum
- Nothofagus
