= Paton James Gloag =

Scottish minister and theological author

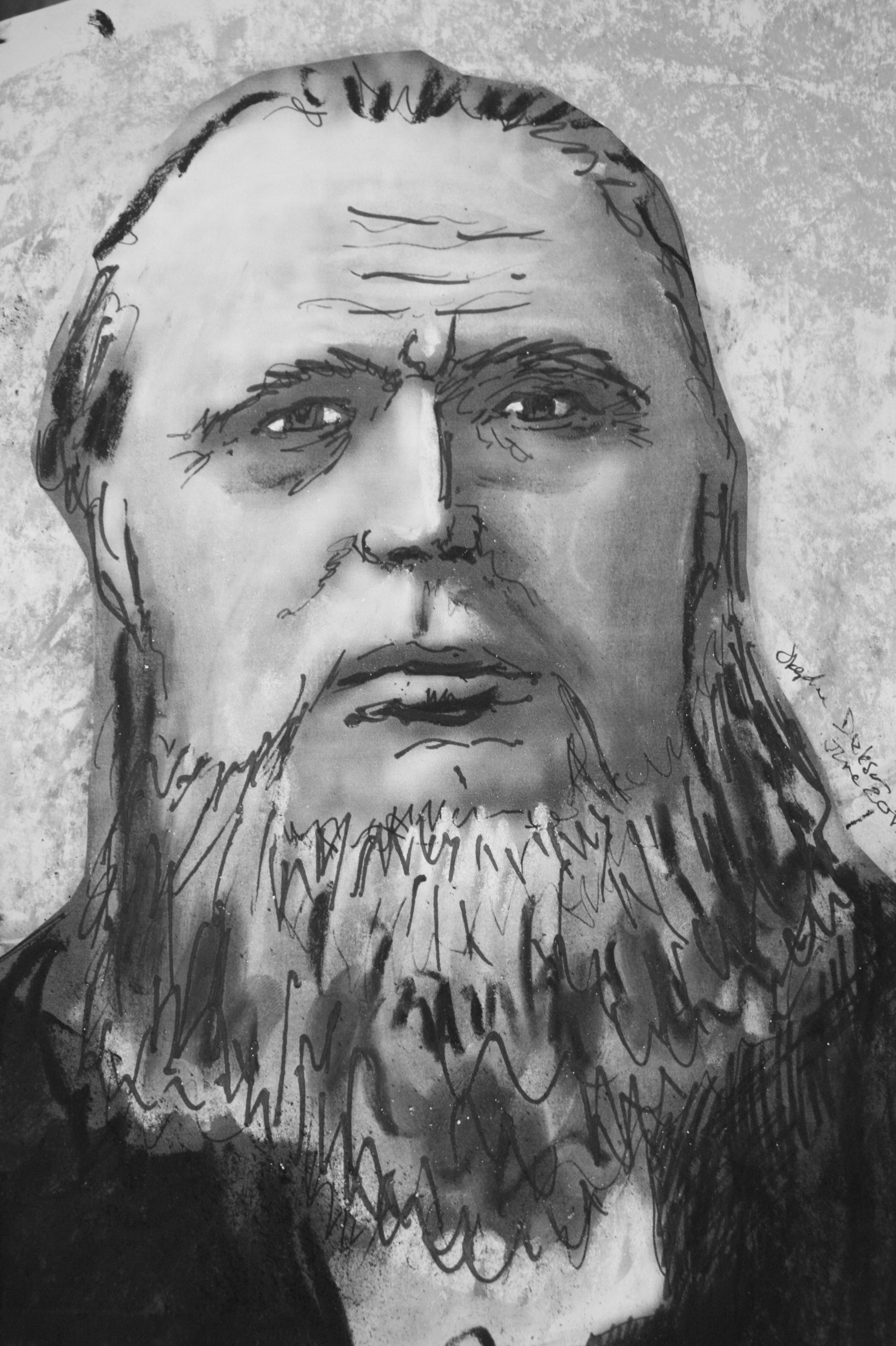

Paton James Gloag (1823–1906) was a Scottish minister and theological author. He was Moderator of the General Assembly of the Church of Scotland in 1889.

== Life ==
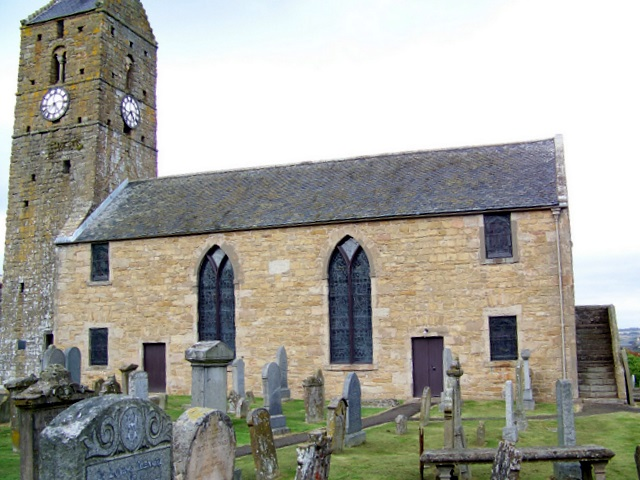
St Serf's Church, Dunning

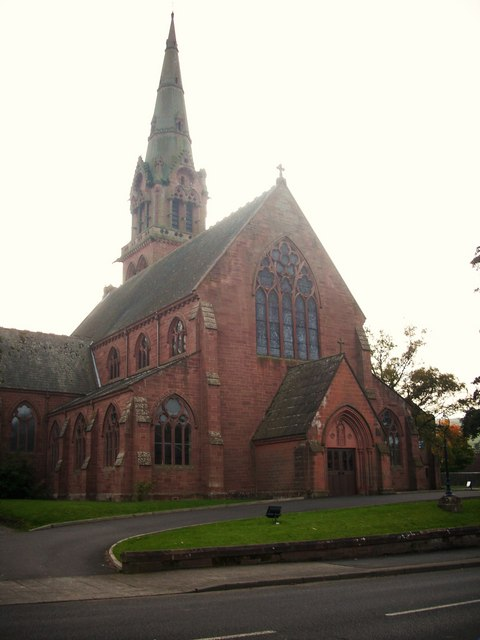
The Old Parish and St. Paul's Church, Galashiels

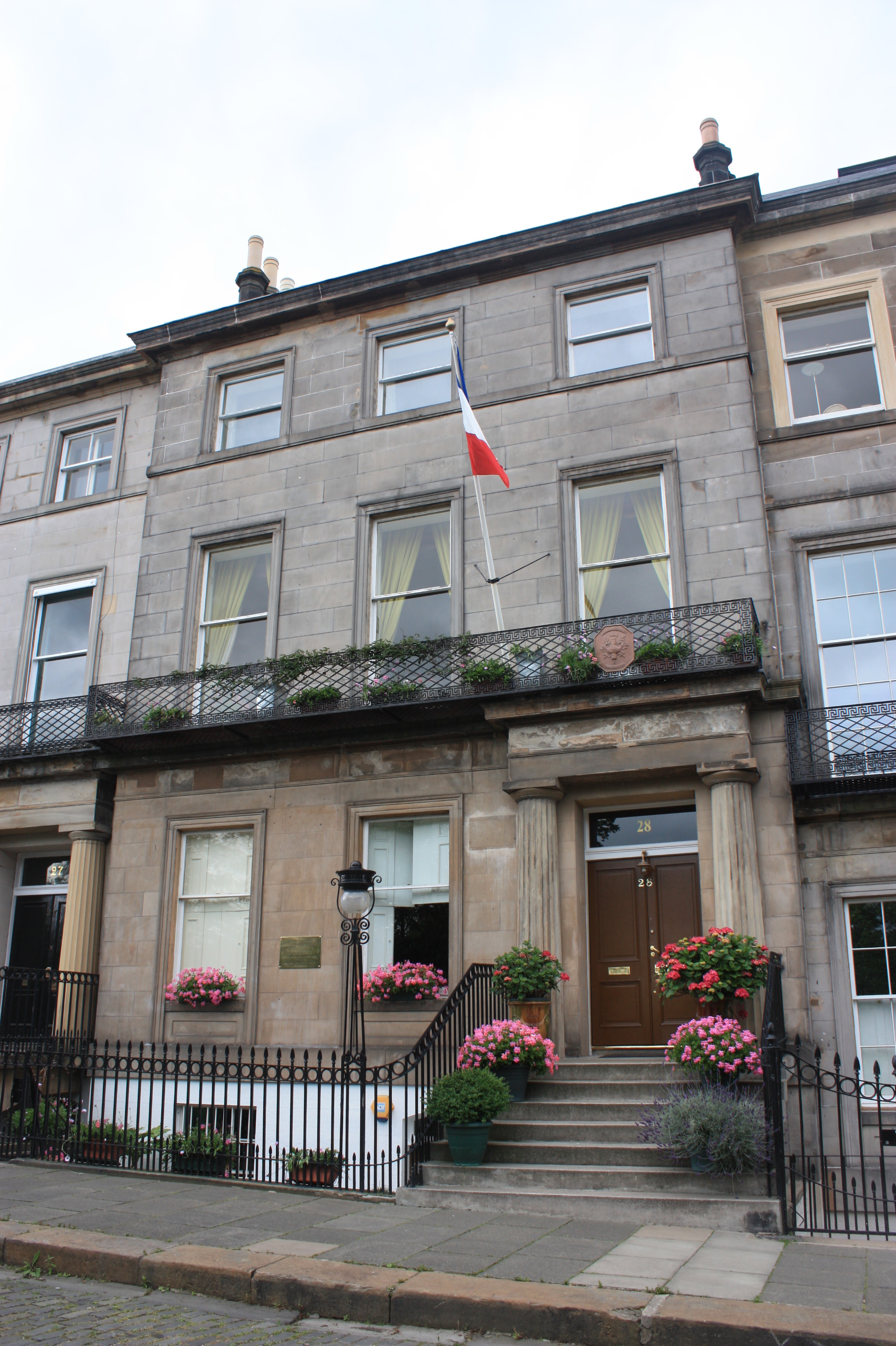
28 Regent Terrace, Edinburgh

Born in Perth on 17 May 1823, he was the eldest son of William Gloag (died 1856), a banker in Perth, by his wife Janet (Jessie) Burn (died 1864), daughter of John Burn, WS of Edinburgh. William Gloag, Lord Kincairney was his younger brother. His eldest sister was Jessie Burn Gloag, who founded a ragged school in Perth.

Educated at Perth grammar school, then studied divinity at Edinburgh University from 1841. Due to the Disruption of 1843 he relocated to St Andrews University and completed his degree there. He was licensed to preach in 1846 and from 1848 to 1857 was minister of Dunning a remote village in southern Perthshire. In 1860 he moved to Blantyre and in 1871 he moved to Galashiels, in place of Rev K. M. Phin. In 1879 he delivered The Baird Lecture in Glasgow on the topic of “The Messianic Prophecy” He made several trips to Germany where he befriended August Tholuck.

In 1892 he gave up his parochial duties and went to Edinburgh to concentrate on writing. In 1896 he accepted a post of professor of Biblical criticism at Aberdeen University.

Gloag was influenced by the writings of John Pye-Smith. He was an advocate of gap creationism.

On 9 January 1906 he died in his Edinburgh home, 28 Regent Terrace on Calton Hill, a very large Georgian townhouse. However, he is buried in the small parish churchyard of Dunning, next to his parents.

A memorial stained glass window was erected to his memory in St Pauls Parish Church in Galashiels.

== Family ==
In 1867 he married Elizabeth Stobie Lang (1840–1914), daughter of Rev Gavin Lang of Glasford. They had no children.

== Artistic recognition ==
In 1889, whilst Moderator, he was painted by George Reid RSA.

== Publications ==
- A Treatise on Justification (1850)
- A Treatise on Assurance of Salvation (1853)
- The Primeval World: A Treatise on the Relations of Geology to Theology (1859) a reaction to “On the Origin of Species”
- The Resurrection (1862)
- Practical Christianity (1866)
- Commencing on the Acts of the Apostles (1870)
- Introduction to the Pauline Epistles (1874)
- St James and St Jude (1881)
- Commentary on the Epistle of St James (1883)
- Exegetical Studies (1884)
- Introduction to the Catholic Epistles (1887)
- Commentary on the Thessalonians (1887)
- Introduction to the Johannine Writings (1891)
- Life of St John (1892)
- Introduction to the Synoptic Gospels (1895)
