= Adam Smith Professor of Political Economy =

Chair at the University of Glasgow

Adam Smith Chair of Political Economy University of Glasgow
- Incumbent; Sayantan Ghosal since 2020
- Formation: 1896
- First holder: William Smart

The Adam Smith Chair of Political Economy is a chair at the University of Glasgow, named for Adam Smith, pioneering economist, author of The Wealth of Nations, and one of the university's most famous alumni. It was established in 1896 from a lectureship which had been endowed in 1892 by Andrew Stewart, founder of Stewarts & Lloyds tube-manufacturers. Occupants are appointed by the University Court acting with a representative of the Merchants' House of Glasgow, the Trades House of Glasgow and the Chamber of Commerce of Glasgow.

== History ==
The first occupant of the chair was William Smart. He had previously been lecturer in Political Economy at Queen Margaret College and the university's first official lecturer in Political Economy. He remained in the chair until his death in 1915, and was succeeded the same year by William Scott. Scott, originally from Northern Ireland, was a political economy lecturer at the University of St Andrews when appointed, and an authority on Adam Smith. He served as president of the Royal Philosophical Society of Glasgow from 1931 to 1934 and of the Royal Economic Society from 1935 to 1937. Scott also remained in the chair until his death, in 1940. He was succeeded by Alec Macfie in 1945. He had a distinguished career, retiring in 1958, and was dean of Faculties from 1974 to 1978. In 1990, the James Bonar Chair of Political Economy was renamed the Bonar-Macfie Chair.

In 1958, Thomas Wilson was appointed to the chair from Oxford. Originally from Northern Ireland, Wilson had studied at Queen's University Belfast and the London School of Economics, and worked during the War in the Ministries of Economic Warfare and Aircraft Production and the Prime Minister's Statistical Branch, being appointed an OBE in the 1945 Prime Minister's Resignation Honours. He retired in 1985 and was succeeded that year by David Vines. Vines was appointed shortly after completing his PhD at the University of Cambridge, and left Glasgow in 1992 to become a Fellow in Economics at Balliol College, Oxford, becoming a professor of economics at Oxford in 2000.

In 1994, Andrew Skinner, the university's Daniel Jack Professor of Economics, was appointed to the Adam Smith Chair. He was succeeded in the Daniel Jack Chair by Anton Muscatelli, now Principal of the University. Skinner was a graduate of the university and served as dean of the Faculty of Social Sciences, Clerk of Senate and vice-principal, retiring in 2000. He was succeeded by Gary Koop.

In 2005, Ronald MacDonald, Professor of International Finance at the University of Strathclyde, was appointed to the chair. MacDonald is an internationally respected economist and an authority on exchange rates. He has been a consulatant and advisor to the IMF, the World Bank, the European Commission, the ECB and numerous other central banks, alongside his parallel work for many private sector financial institutions, and also public sector institutions, such as the UK's National Audit Office and the Planning Office of the Qatari government. He has successfully supervised over 40 PhD students and on his transfer to Glasgow University developed the successful suite of finance based MSc courses, and built Glasgow’s PhD programme from one student to its current steady state of 40. Additionally, MacDinald has over 18,000 citations on Google Scholar, is also a Research Fellow of the CESifo network and International Fellow of Keil University and consistently ranks in the top 1% of economicsts in the REPEC world rankings. He was a fellow of the RSE from 2000 to 2014. His pathbreaking work on equilibrium exchange rates has been used by all the leading central banks and beyond and his Behavioural Equilibrium Exhchange approach was used to determine the lockdown rates for the euro zone. Alongside his consulting work, he held the chair on a part-time basis.

In 2020, Sayantan Ghosal, Professor in Economics at the University of Glasgow, a Fellow of the Academy of Social Sciences and Fellow of the Royal Society of Edinburgh, was appointed to the chair. Over the course of his career, Professor Ghosal has gained widespread recognition for his research in economic theory and its applications. He has written pioneering papers on behavioural poverty traps and bounded rationality and on the strategic foundations of general equilibrium. He has held several UKRI research grants, has supervised over 25 PhD students, served as a member of the ESRC Strategic Advisory Network. He has engaged with policy makers in the UK and Scottish Government, the Govt. of Delhi and West Bengal, the World Bank and NGOs and activists in Delhi, West Bengal, Vietnam and Malawi.

=== Andrew Stewart ===
Andrew Stewart (1832–1901) was born in Johnstone and grew up in Glasgow. He became an apprentice to a tube-manufacturer, and established his own business in 1861, selling pipes for gas and water. In 1867, he and his brother, James, formed a partnership, A & J Stewart, which went on to become Stewarts & Lloyds, one of the largest steel tube-manufacturers in the country. In 1896, he made a gift to the University of Glasgow to establish the Adam Smith Chair in Political Economy. The university awarded him an LLD in 1900.

== Adam Smith Professors of Political Economy ==
- 1896–1915: William Smart
- 1915–1940: William Robert Scott
- 1945–1958: Alec Lawrence Macfie
- 1958–1985: Thomas Wilson
- 1985–1992: David Vines
- 1994–2000: Andrew Stewart Skinner
- 2000–2005: Gary Koop
- 2005–2020: Ronald MacDonald
- 2020–present: Sayantan Ghosal

== See also ==
- List of Professorships at the University of Glasgow
