= K. M. Phin =

Scottish minister

Kenneth Macleay Phin (1816–1888) was a Scottish minister who served as Moderator of the General Assembly of the Church of Scotland in 1877. He ran the Church of Scotland’s Home Mission Scheme. As a church campaigner and pamphleteer he was known as The Investigator.

== Life ==
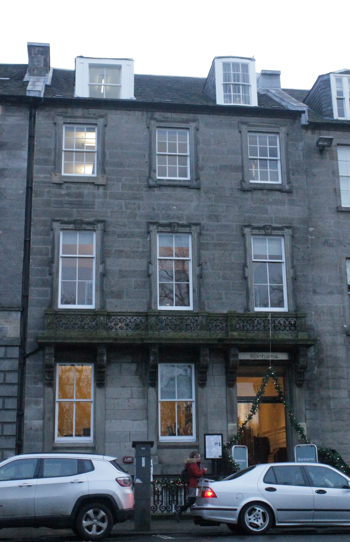
22 Queen Street, Edinburgh

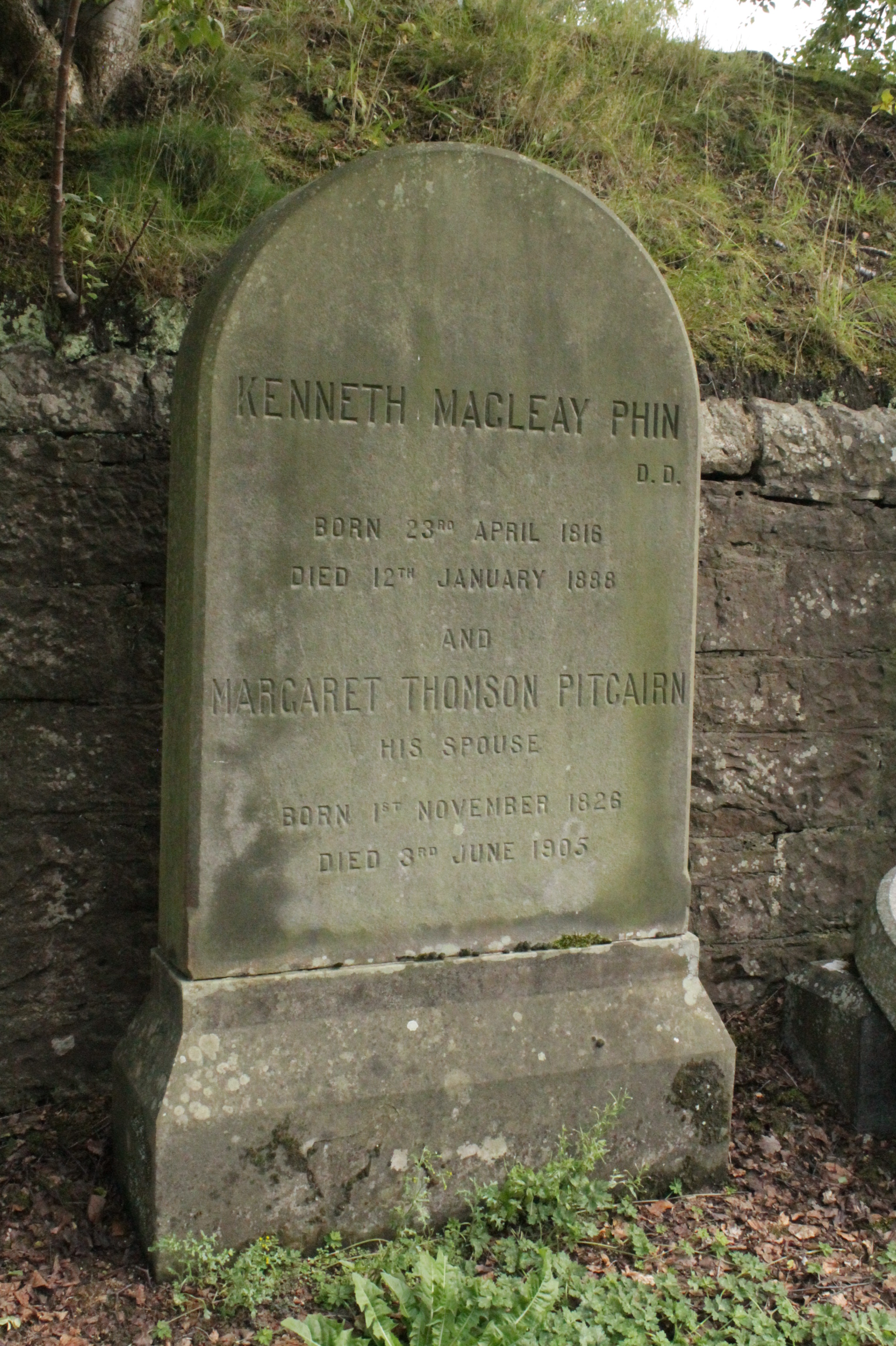
The grave of Rev Kenneth Phin, Grange Cemetery, Edinburgh

He was born on 23 April 1816 the only son of Margaret Elizabeth, the daughter of Provost Macleay of Caithness, and Rev Robert Phin (1777–1840) minister of Wick. His mother died soon after he was born. He was sent to study at the University of Edinburgh and licensed to preach as a Church of Scotland minister by the Presbytery of Caithness in November 1837.

He was ordained as minister of Galashiels from May 1841 under patronage of Hugh Scott of Gala. He was a member of the Wodrow Society, based in Edinburgh 1841 to 1847. In 1863 he spoke against the admission of women into Scottish universities. He retired in 1870 and thereafter committed himself fully to mission work in Scottish cities. His position in Galashiels was filled by Rev Paton James Gloag. From 1863 to 1888 Phin was Convenor of the Army and Navy Chaplains Committee. The University of Edinburgh awarded him an honorary Doctor of Divinity in 1869.

During his mission work he operated from 22 Queen Street in Edinburgh's New Town and lived at 13 Chalmers Street near the Edinburgh Royal Infirmary.

He died in Edinburgh on 12 January 1888 and is buried in Grange Cemetery. The grave lies on the south edge of the north-west section, backing onto the embankment.

== Family ==
In March 1852 he married Margaret Thomson Pitcairn (1826–1905) of 8 Ainslie Place on the Moray Estate in Edinburgh's West End, daughter of the late James Pitcairn.
