= Thomas Nicol (anatomist) =

Scottish anatomist

Thomas Nicol FRSE FRCS FRCSE (1900–1983) was a 20th-century Scottish anatomist. He is remembered for his research on Beta-estradiol. He was professor of anatomy at King's College, London from 1936 to 1967. He was affectionately known as Tommy Nicol.

== Life ==
He was born on 4 August 1900 the son of William Nicol and his wife, Mary Wilson Gilmour.

He studied medicine at Glasgow University and graduated MB ChB in 1922. He then became senior house surgeon under Sir William Macewen at Glasgow Royal Infirmary. He concurrently worked as an anatomical Demonstrator at the university, and was promoted to Lecturer in 1927.

In 1933 he was elected a Fellow of the Royal Society of Edinburgh. His proposers were Thomas Hastie Bryce, David Waterston, Edward Provan Cathcart, and Sir John Graham Kerr.

In 1935 he received the Bellahouston Medal for his doctorate (MD) thesis. In 1936 he succeeded Prof Duncan M. Blair as professor of anatomy at King's College, London. In London he was also the John Hunter Lecturer at St George's Hospital and the Malcolm McHardy Lecturer at the Royal Eye Hospital.

He retired from surgery in 1967 but then became director of the Institute of Laryngology and Otology, a post he held until 1982.

He died on 7 February 1983.

== Family ==
In 1927 he married Evelyn Bertha Keeling. She died of heart failure in 1966.

They had one son and one daughter.
