= Tony Prosser =

United Kingdom law professor

James Anthony William Prosser FBA (born 3 May 1954), usually known as Tony Prosser, is professor of public law at the University of Bristol, having previously been John Millar Professor of Law, at the University of Glasgow. His research focuses on legal aspects of regulation and privatisation.

In 2014 he was elected a Fellow of the British Academy, the United Kingdom's national academy for the humanities and social sciences.
