= Regius Professor of Botany (Glasgow) =

The Regius Chair of Botany at the University of Glasgow is a Regius Professorship established in 1818.

A lectureship in botany had been founded in 1704. From 1718 to 1818, the subject was combined with Anatomy. The chair was founded in 1818 by King George III.

== Regius Professors of Botany ==
- For 1718–1818, see: Regius Professor of Anatomy
- Robert Graham MD (1818)
- Sir William Jackson Hooker MA LLD DCL FRS (1820)
- John Hutton Balfour MA MD (1841)
- George Arnott Walker-Arnott MA LLD, Advocate (1845)
- Alexander Dickson MA MD (1868)
- Sir Isaac Bayley Balfour MA MD DSc FRS (1879)
- Frederick Orpen Bower MA ScD LLD FRS (1885)
- James Montague Frank Drummond MA (1925)
- John Walton MA DSc ScD D-es-Sc LLD (1930)
- Percy Wragg Brian BA PhD DPhil (1963)
- John Harrison Burnett MA DPhil (1968)
- Malcolm Barrett Wilkins PhD DSc FRSE (1970)
- Michael Robert Blatt BSc PhD FRSE (2001)

== See also ==
- List of Professorships at the University of Glasgow
