= Tom Campbell (philosopher) =

Scottish philosopher and jurist (1938–2019)

- Education: University of Glasgow; Balliol College, Oxford
- Scientific career
- Fields: Philosophy of Law, Human Rights, Business and Ethics, Adam Smith
- Workplaces: University of Stirling; University of Glasgow; Australian National University; Centre for Applied Philosophy and Public Ethics (CAPPE)

Thomas (Tom) Douglas Campbell (1938–2019) was a Scottish philosopher and jurist. He held academic positions in Scotland and Australia, and was a professorial fellow of the Centre for Applied Philosophy and Public Ethics (CAPPE) in Canberra.

== Early life ==
Campbell studied mental philosophy at the University of Glasgow, graduating M.A. with first class honours in 1962, and received a Snell Exhibition to study theology at Balliol College, Oxford, graduating in 1964. He then returned to Glasgow to study for a Ph.D., with a thesis entitled Adam Smith and the Sociology of Morals, whilst lecturing in the university on social and political philosophy. His Ph.D. was awarded in 1969.

== Career ==
Campbell left Glasgow in 1973 to become professor of philosophy at the recently established University of Stirling, returning in 1979 as professor of jurisprudence.

In 1990, Campbell left Scotland for Australia, to become professor of law at the Australian National University, serving as dean of the Faculty of Law from 1994 to 1997. He retired in 2001 and then was a professorial fellow at the Centre for Applied Philosophy and Public Ethics (CAPPE), a joint venture of the Australian National University, Charles Sturt University and University of Melbourne, and director of the Charles Sturt University Division of the centre.

== Death ==
Campbell died in Canberra on 27 July 2019, aged 81.

== See also ==
- ANU College of Law
- University of Glasgow School of Law

Academic offices
| Preceded by Sandy Anton | Professor of Jurisprudence, University of Glasgow; 1979–1990 | Succeeded by Scott Veitch |
