= Gerry Maher =

Scottish lawyer and academic

Gerard 'Gerry' Maher KC (1953–2023) was a Scottish lawyer and academic. He was a Law Commissioner at the Scottish Law Commission from 2000 to 2008, Professor of Criminal Law at Strathclyde Law School from 1992 to 2000, and a Professor of Criminal Law at the University of Edinburgh.

Maher studied Law at the University of Glasgow and obtained a B.Litt. at the University of Oxford in 1976. He was admitted to the Faculty of Advocates in 1987 and was a practising Advocate from 1989 to 1991. He was appointed as a full-time Commissioner at the Scottish Law Commission in February 2000, and was appointed Queen's Counsel in 2003.

Maher was the author of textbooks on international private law and (with Sheriff Douglas Cusine) was the author of a textbook on the law of diligence (the means by which civil law judgments are enforced against assets in Scotland). During his time at the Scottish Law Commission, Maher had responsibility for finalising the Commission work on the reform of the law of diligence - largely implemented by the Bankruptcy and Diligence (Scotland) Act 2007. Maher was in charge of the Scottish Law Commission's proposed reform of rape laws. His term of office at the Commission ended in 2008.
