= W. R. Scott (economist) =

William Robert Scott FBA (31 August 1868 – 3 April 1940) was a political economist who was Adam Smith Professor of Political Economy at the University of Glasgow from 1915 to 1940.

== Career ==
Born in Omagh, County Tyrone, on 31 August 1868, William Robert Scott was the son of Charles Scott, JP, of Lisnamallard in Omagh. He attended Trinity College, Dublin; graduating with a Bachelor of Arts degree in 1889, Scott won the Wray Prize and was First Senior Moderator in Logics and Ethics. He proceeded to a Master of Arts degree two years later, and joined the University of St Andrews in 1896 as assistant to the Professor of Moral Philosophy (in which post he remained until 1901). In 1898, he became a research fellow at St Andrews, and completed his Doctor of Philosophy degree in 1900, a year after he was appointed to a lectureship in political economy. In 1915, he was appointed Adam Smith Professor of Political Economy at the University of Glasgow, and remained in the position until 1940. Scott died on 3 April 1940; his wife, Alice (nee Neeve) had died in 1929, but they were survived by a son and daughter.

Scott was an authority on the work of the economist Adam Smith. Among a range of other positions, he was president of the Economic History Society in 1928, the Royal Philosophical Society from 1931 to 1934, and the Royal Economic Society between 1935 and 1937. He was also the Jevons Memorial Lecturer at University College London from 1916 to 1918, and served on a number of government committees, including the Committee on the Fishing Industry to which he was appointed chairman in 1931.

== Honours and awards ==
Trinity College, Dublin, awarded Scott with a Doctor of Letters degree in 1902. In 1915, he was elected a Fellow of the British Academy, the United Kingdom's national academy for the humanities and social sciences. In 1923 he delivered the British Academy's Master-Mind Lecture, on Adam Smith.

== Selected publications ==
- An Introduction to Cudworth's Treatise Concerning Eternal and Immutable Morality; with Life of Cudworth and a Few Critical Notes (Longmans, 1891).
- Francis Hutcheson: His Life, Teaching and Position in the History of Philosophy (Cambridge University Press, 1900).
- Scottish Economic Literature to 1800 (W. Hodge and Co., 1911).
- The Constitution and Finance of English, Scottish, and Irish Joint Stock Companies to 1720, 3 vols. (Cambridge University Press, 1910–12) Vol. 1, Vol. 2, Vol. 3.
- Report to the Board of Agriculture for Scotland on Home Industries in the Highlands and Islands (1914).
- Economic Problems of Peace after War, The Jevons Memorial Lecture (Cambridge University Press, 1917–18).
- (C-authored with James Cunnison) The Industries of the Clyde Valley during the War (Clarendon Press, 1924).
- Adam Smith as Student and Professor. Glasgow: Jackson Son & Co. 1937 – via Internet Archive.
