= David Maxwell Walker =

Scottish lawyer

David Maxwell Walker CBE QC FBA FRSE (9 April 1920 – 5 January 2014) was a Scottish lawyer, academic, and Regius Professor of Law at the University of Glasgow.

== Early life ==
Walker was educated at the High School of Glasgow, at the time the city's publicly funded grammar school, where he was Mackindlay Prizeman in Classics. He was the son of a bank agent who died when Walker was 14.

Walker then began study at the University of Glasgow, but interrupted this to join the Army at the outbreak of World War II in 1939. He began as a non-commissioned officer in the Cameronians, was seconded to the Royal Army Service Corps in 1941, and then served with the Indian Armed Forces in India in 1942, in southwest Asia from 1942 to 1943, and in Italy from 1943 to 1946, rising to the rank of captain.

He resumed study at Glasgow in 1945, graduating MA in classics in 1946 and LLB (Distinction) (Robertson Scholar) in 1948, and was called to the Bar the same year. Whilst practising at the Bar he undertook postgraduate study as Faulds Fellow in Law at the University of Glasgow from 1949 to 1952 and was awarded a PhD by the University of Edinburgh for his thesis on equity in Scots law, graduating in 1952.

== Career ==
From 1953 to 1954 he studied at the Institute of Advanced Legal Studies of the University of London, and in 1954 was appointed Professor of Jurisprudence at the School of Law of the University of Glasgow. He won the Blackwell Prize of the University of Aberdeen in 1955, and was Dean of the Faculty of Law and Financial Studies between 1956 and 1959. In 1958, he succeeded Andrew Dewar Gibb as Regius Professor of Law at Glasgow, and was appointed Queen's Counsel. As Regius Professor he published widely in the area of Scots Private Law, remaining in this post until 1990. He continued as Emeritus Regius Professor, and was succeeded by Professor Joe Thomson. He was appointed a Fellow of the Royal Society of Edinburgh in 1980 and served as its Vice-President from 1985 to 1988. He was awarded honorary degrees of LLD by the Universities of London (1968), Edinburgh (1974), and Glasgow (1985), and was appointed CBE in 1986.

=== Publications ===
- Law of Damages in Scotland, 1955
- The Scottish Legal System, 1959, 8th edn 2001
- Law of Delict in Scotland, 1966, 2nd edn 1981
- Scottish Courts and Tribunals, 1969, 5th edn 1985
- Principles of Scottish Private Law (2 vols), 1970, 4th edn (4 vols), 1988–89
- Law of Prescription and Limitation in Scotland, 1973, 6th edn 2002
- Law of Civil Remedies in Scotland, 1974
- Law of Contracts in Scotland, 1979, 3rd edn 1995
- Oxford Companion to Law, 1980
- (ed) Stair's Institutions (6th edn), 1981
- (ed) Stair Tercentenary Studies, 1981
- The Scottish Jurists, 1985
- Legal History of Scotland, 7 vols, 1988–2004
- Scottish Part of Topham and Ivamy's Company Law, 12th edn 1955, to 16th edn 1978;

== Personal life ==
Walker married Margaret Knox in 1954. His interests included motoring, book-collecting and Scottish history. He served as Governor of the High School of Glasgow from 1974 to 2001. He lived in the West End of Glasgow until his death aged 93 on 5 January 2014.

== Notes ==
Academic offices
Preceded by Professor Andrew Gibb	Regius Professor of Law, University of Glasgow; 1958–1990	Succeeded by Professor Joe Thomson
