= Sayantan Ghosal (economist) =

Sayantan Ghosal is a Economist and Academic

Sayantan Ghosal (Economist)
- Title: Adam Smith Chair of Political Economy
- Awards: Fellow of the Royal Society of Edinburgh; Fellow of the Academy of Social Sciences

Academic background
- Education: Mumbai University (B.A. in Economics); Delhi University (M.A. in Economics); Université Catholique de Louvain (CORE) (Ph.D. in Economics)

Academic work
- Institutions: University of Glasgow

Sayantan Ghosal is an economist and academic. He is a professor and the Adam Smith Chair of Political Economy at the University of Glasgow. His research interests have included economic theory, behavioral economics, political economy, and development economics. He is a fellow of the Royal Society of Edinburgh (RSE) and the Academy of Social Sciences (AcSS).

== Education ==
Ghosal completed his B.A. in Economics from Mumbai University and his M.A. in Economics from Delhi University in 1988 and 1990, respectively. Later in 1996, he earned his Ph.D. in Economics from the Université Catholique de Louvain (CORE).

== Career ==
From 1995 to 1997, Ghosal began his academic career as a lecturer at the University of London. Subsequently, he joined the University of Warwick as a lecturer. At the same institution, he became senior lecturer in 2001, professor in 2004, and research director of the Economic and Social Research Council (ESRC)-funded Centre for Competitive Advantage in the Global Economy in 2010, where he is an external research associate. He served as the dean for Interdisciplinarity and Impact at the College of Social Sciences at Glasgow University. He also worked as the cluster lead for the Applied Economics Research Cluster and associate director of research at Adam Smith Business School.

Ghosal is an external research associate at the International Network on Expectations Coordination funded by the Institute for New Economic Thinking (INET). At the University of Glasgow, he is an academic ambassador for the "addressing inequalities" research beacon and a professor. In 2020, he was appointed as the Adam Smith Chair of Political Economy at the same institution.

Ghosal is a member of the editorial board of Humanities and Social Sciences Communications. He worked as a project lead for the Foreign, Commonwealth and Development Office (FCDO), Global Challenges Research Fund (GCRF), and ESRC.

== Research ==
Ghosal's research has focused on economic theory as well as behavioral, development, and political economy.

=== Economic theory and political economy ===
Ghosal studied market games with a specified number of agents and goods to analyze retrading, demonstrating that even with myopic trading, allocations can approach the Pareto frontier arbitrarily closely. He analyzed labor productivity in the United States and Britain to demonstrate how the United States' industrialization of services contributed to the productivity gap between the two countries.

Ghosal identified that moral hazard in sovereign debtors arises due to unverifiable payoffs and misalignment of sovereigns' and creditors' interests. He built a coalition formation model of democratization that emphasizes the role of intra-elite conflict and the limited capacity of non-elite groups to organize collectively. He examined the comparison between compulsory and voluntary voting, establishing that voluntary voting generates very limited or substantial turnout.

=== Aspiration and behavioral changes ===
Together with Patricio Dalton and Anandi Mani, Ghosal proposed a theory of aspiration formation to establish how poverty leads to aspiration failure. In 2019, Eliana La Ferrara published a study in the Journal of the European Economic Association, which she presented as a presidential address at the European Economic Association in Cologne. In her paper, she dedicated a section to describe their theory and discuss it alongside another formal approach to economic development and aspirations. A survey published in The World Bank Research Observer also cited Ghosal's co-authored work in discussing the association between aspiration and individual circumstances.

Along with Dalton, Ghosal highlighted the significance of psychological treatment as a soft policy intervention for guiding people to internalise feedback effects between their behaviors and their aspirations and utilizing behavioral strategies to improve their psychological condition.

While conducting an experimental study on Indian sex workers, Ghosal highlighted the significance of increased psychological self-efficacy (PSE) in reducing fatalistic thinking and improving psychological well-being as well as health-seeking behaviors. His experimental study is also cited in the World Bank's World Development Report 2015, which documented increased self-esteem, happiness, and agency after intervention.

== Awards and honors ==
- 2024 – Fellow, Royal Society of Edinburgh (RSE)
- Fellow – Academy of Social Sciences (AcSS)

== Selected articles ==
- Broadberry, Stephen; Ghosal, Sayantan (2002). "From the Counting House to the Modern Office: Explaining Anglo-American Productivity Differences in Services, 1870–1990". The Journal of Economic History. 62 (4): 967–998. doi:10.1017/S0022050702001614.
- Ghosal, Sayantan; Miller, Marcus (2003). "Co‐ordination Failure, Moral Hazard and Sovereign Bankruptcy Procedures". The Economic Journal. 113 (487): 276–304. doi:10.1111/1468-0297.00125.
- Dutta, Bhaskar; Ghosal, Sayantan; Ray, Debraj (2005). "Farsighted Network Formation". Journal of Economic Theory. 122 (2): 143–164. doi:10.1016/j.jet.2004.05.001.
- Dalton, Patricio S.; Ghosal, Sayantan; Mani, Anandi (2016). "Poverty and Aspirations Failure". The Economic Journal. 126 (590): 165–188. doi:10.1111/ecoj.12210.
- Ghosal, Sayantan; Jana, Smarajit; Mani, Anandi; Mitra, Sandip; Roy, Sanchari (2022). "Sex Workers, Stigma, and Self-Image: Evidence from Kolkata Brothels". The Review of Economics and Statistics. 104 (3): 431–448. doi:10.1162/rest_a_01013.
