= George Wyburn =

British embryologist

George McCreath Wyburn FRSE FRFPSG (1903–1985) was a British embryologist. He was professor of anatomy at the University of Glasgow from 1948 to 1972.

== Life ==
Wyburn studied medicine at the University of Glasgow under Professor Thomas Hastie Bryce, graduating with an MB ChB in 1925. After graduation he was employed for several years at different Scottish hospitals. In 1930 he took up a position as a lecturer/demonstrator at the University of Glasgow Anatomy Department, and in 1935 became a senior lecturer. He gained a doctorate (DSc) in 1938 and won the Struthers Medal in 1939 for his embryological research.

In 1938 he was elected a Fellow of the Royal Society of Edinburgh. His proposers were Duncan McCallum Blair, John Walton, Thomas Hastie Bryce, and George Walter Tyrrell. He resigned from the society in 1972.

In 1944 he became head of the Anatomy Department and in 1948 he succeeded Professor William James Hamilton to become professor of anatomy at the university.

In 1947 he won the Struthers Medal for a second time, jointly with Paul Bacsich, for their work on the repair of peripheral nerve injuries during the Second world War.

In the 1970s he made a study trip to Otago University in New Zealand and donated a high number of anatomical copper plates.

He retired in 1972 and died in 1985. His position as professor of anatomy was filled by Professor Raymond Scothorne.

== Publications ==
- A Textbook of Human Embryology (1965)
