= Hector MacQueen =

Scottish academic

Hector Lewis MacQueen CBE FBA FRSE (born 1956) is a Scottish academic, a senior scholar of Scots law and legal history, and a former member of the Scottish Law Commission. He is Professor of Private Law at the University of Edinburgh and a former Dean of its Faculty of Law. He is author, co-author and editor of a large number books on Scottish law and legal history, including the 11th, 12th, 13th and 14th editions of the standard text Gloag & Henderson Law of Scotland, and is former Literary Director of the Stair Society. Stetson University College of Law, Florida, appointedway. He is currently a member of the International Advisory Group for the JKLH-funded project, 'The Paradox of Medieval Scotland, 1093-1286'. In 1995 he became a Fellow of The Royal Society of Edinburgh.

He was appointed Commander of the Order of the British Empire (CBE) in the 2019 Birthday Honours for services to legal scholarship.

== Select bibliography ==
- MacQueen, Hector (8 June 1993). Common Law and Feudal Society in Medieval Scotland. Edinburgh, Scotland: Edinburgh University Press. pp. 312p. ISBN 0-7486-0416-2.
- MacQueen, Hector (1 September 1995). Copyright, Competition and Industrial Design, 2nd edn. Edinburgh, Scotland: Edinburgh University Press. pp. 111p. ISBN 0-7486-0733-1.
- MacQueen, Hector (30 November 1995). (ed.) The Laws of Scotland: Stair Memorial Encyclopaedia (Vol. 15). Scotland: Butterworths Law (Scotland). pp. 502p. ISBN 0-406-23700-X.
- MacQueen, Hector (26 September 2006). Studying Scots Law, 3rd revised edn. UK: Tottel Publishing. pp. 248p. ISBN 1-84592-359-6.
- MacQueen, Hector (1 November 2004). Unjustified Enrichment (Law Basics). UK: Thomson/W Green. ISBN 978-0-414-01597-5.
- MacQueen, Hector; Joe Thomson (August 2005). Contract Law in Scotland. UK: Tottel Publishing. pp. 315p. ISBN 1-84592-147-X.
- MacQueen, Hector; Charlotte Waelde; Graeme Laurie (September 2007). Contemporary Intellectual Property: Law and Policy (Oxford Core Texts). UK: Oxford University Press. pp. 512p. ISBN 978-0-19-926339-4.
