= Duncan M. Blair =

Scottish anatomist

Duncan McCallum Blair FRSE FRFPSG (22 July 1896 – 10 November 1944) was a Scottish anatomist. He served as professor of anatomy at Glasgow University from 1935 to 1948.

== Life ==
He was born on 22 July 1896, the son of Dr Alexander Blair. He was educated at Woodside School in Glasgow.

He studied medicine at Glasgow University under Prof Thomas Hastie Bryce, graduating MB ChB in 1919. His studies were interrupted by a period in the Royal Navy Volunteer Reserve from 1915 to 1919. After graduating he joined the department staff as an anatomy demonstrator. In 1922 he became a lecturer in anatomy.

In 1927 he became professor of anatomy at King's College, London he quickly rose to be dean of faculty. From 1931 he also was the John Hunter Lectuter at St George's Hospital, London. In 1935 he returned to Glasgow University as professor of anatomy. His post at King's College was filled by Thomas Nicol.

In 1936 he was elected a Fellow of the Royal Society of Edinburgh. His proposers were Thomas Hastie Bryce, James Couper Brash, Edward Provan Cathcart, Thomas Nicol and Sir Edward Battersby Bailey.

In 1935 he succeeded Thomas Hastie Bryce as professor of anatomy at Glasgow University. He resided at 2 The Square in Glasgow: a house associated with the position. He died in office on 10 November 1944 and after a short interregnum was replaced by Prof George Wyburn. A service was held in the university chapel on 12 November. His house was passed to Prof William Marshall Smart.

== Family ==
In 1928 he married Leonie Elspet Stewart.
