= George Arnott Walker Arnott =

Scottish botanist (1799–1868)

George Arnott Walker Arnott FRSE
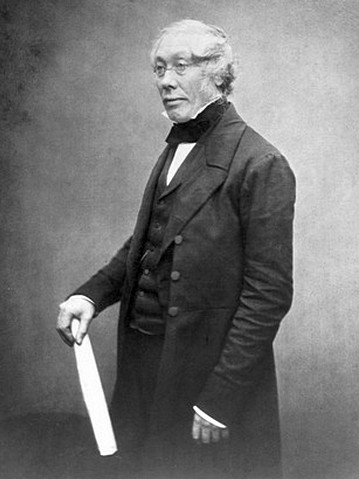
- Born: George Arnott Walker Arnott; 6 February 1799; Edinburgh, Scotland
- Died: 17 April 1868 (aged 69); Glasgow, Scotland
- Resting place: Sighthill Cemetery
- Education: Milnathort Parish School; High School of Edinburgh
- Occupation: Botanist
- Spouse: Mary Hay Barclay

George Arnott Walker Arnott of Arlary FRSE (6 February 1799 – 17 April 1868) was a Scottish botanist. He collaborated with botanists from around the world and served as a regius professor of botany at the University of Glasgow. An orchid genus Arnottia was named in his honour in 1828. The standard author abbreviation Arn. is used to indicate this person as the author when citing a botanical name.

== Early life ==
George Arnott Walker Arnott was born in Edinburgh, on 6 February 1799, the son of David Walker Arnott of Arlary (near Kinross). He grew up in Edenshead and Arlary, and attended Milnathort Parish School then the High School of Edinburgh from 1807. He received an AM degree in 1818. He took to mathematics and was recognized by Sir John Leslie and John Playfair. He wrote articles in Tilloch's Philosophical Magazine on Observations on the Solution of Exponential Equations (1817) and Comparison between the Chords of Arcs employed by Ptolemy and those now in use (1818). He then joined to study law in Edinburgh from 1821. In 1822, his father died and he became heir to the estate in Arlary. Finding law boring, he preferred the lectures of Professor Robert Jameson and John Stewart. He also attended the classes of Robert Kaye Greville on cryptogams. He moved to France and began to examine the herbaria of Baron Delessert there. He also attended the classes of Adrien de Jussieu. He wrote on a classification of the mosses, and for this he was soon elected Fellow of the Linnean Society in 1825. He also made a collection of diatoms. Arnott issued a work called Diatomées. Collection J. Derby which might be a unique or exsiccata-like.

== Career ==
Arnott travelled in Spain and Russia in 1828 and 1829. He then began to work with Sir William Jackson Hooker, examining the collections from Captain Beechey's voyage and those of other collectors including Alexander Collie. This took ten years and helped establish a reputation. He described species from across the world, writing and collaborating with numerous correspondents. With his contemporary from high school Robert Wight, he collaborated on plants from India. He received an LLD in 1837 from the University of Aberdeen. He replaced Hooker as lecturer at Glasgow University in 1839 and became Regius Professor of Botany in 1845, a position he held until his death. Among his students was John Lindsay Stewart.

He was a member of numerous learned societies including the Societe de Histoire Naturelle in Paris and the Moscow Imperial Society of Natural History.

== Personal life and death ==
Walker Arnott married Mary Hay Barclay in 1831 and they had three sons and five daughters. His pastimes included curling. A freemason he rose to deputy grand master of the Scottish order. He lived in Glasgow where died in 1868, aged 69, and is buried in Sighthill Cemetery. The orchid genus Arnottia was named in his honour by Achille Richard in 1828.

In 1839, along with Houston Rigg Brown, Walker Arnott "resuscitated" the Royal Order of Scotland of Freemasonry, which may have been founded before 1732, but by 1819 was on the verge of extinction.
