= Regius Professor of Law (Glasgow) =

Regius Chair of Law University of Glasgow
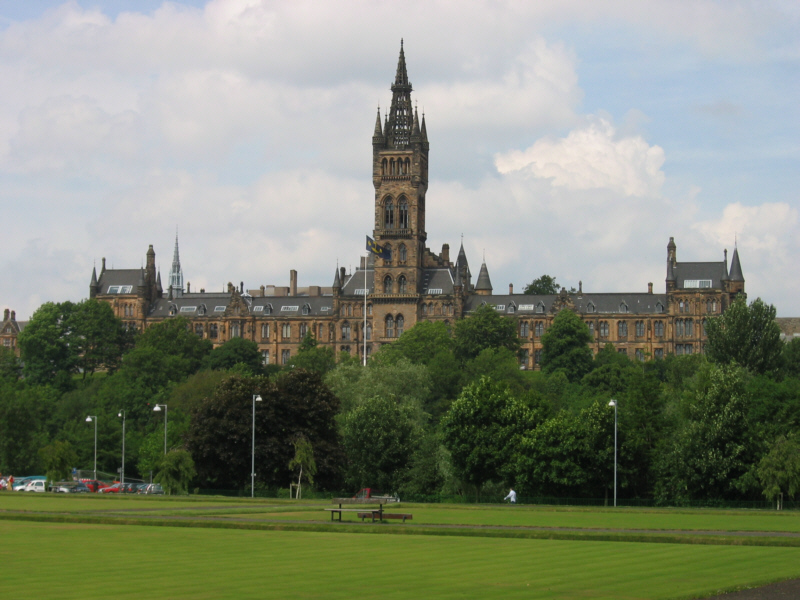
- Incumbent; James Chalmers since 2012
- Precursor: Chair of Law
- Formation: 1713
- First holder: William Forbes
- Website: www.law.gla.ac.uk

The Regius Chair of Law at the University of Glasgow was founded in December 1713 with an endowment by Queen Anne. (Its foundation is sometimes incorrectly dated to 1712, due to an error in Glasgow's Munimenta, published in 1854. ) It is one of twelve Regius Professorships within the University of Glasgow. The first holder of the chair, William Forbes, was appointed in 1714. The current holder, James Chalmers, was appointed in 2012.

== Regius Professors of Law ==
- William Forbes MA (1714)
- William Cross, Advocate (1746)
- Hercules Lindsay LLD (1750)
- John Millar, advocate (1761)
- Robert Davidson LLD (1801)
- Allan Alexander Wellwood Maconochie LLD (1842)
- George Skene, Advocate (1855)
- Robert Berry MA LLD (1867)
- Alexander Moody Stuart LLD (1887)
- William Gloag KC BA LLD (1905)
- Andrew Dewar Gibb MBE QC MA LLD (1934)
- David Maxwell Walker CBE QC MA PhD LLD FRSE FBA (1958)
- Joe Thomson LLB FRSE (1991)
- James Chalmers KC (Hon) LLB LLM Dip LP (2012)

== See also ==
- List of Professorships at the University of Glasgow
- University of Glasgow School of Law
