= University of Glasgow School of Law =

Law school in Glasgow, Scotland

Coordinates: 55°52′18.30″N 4°17′26.20″W

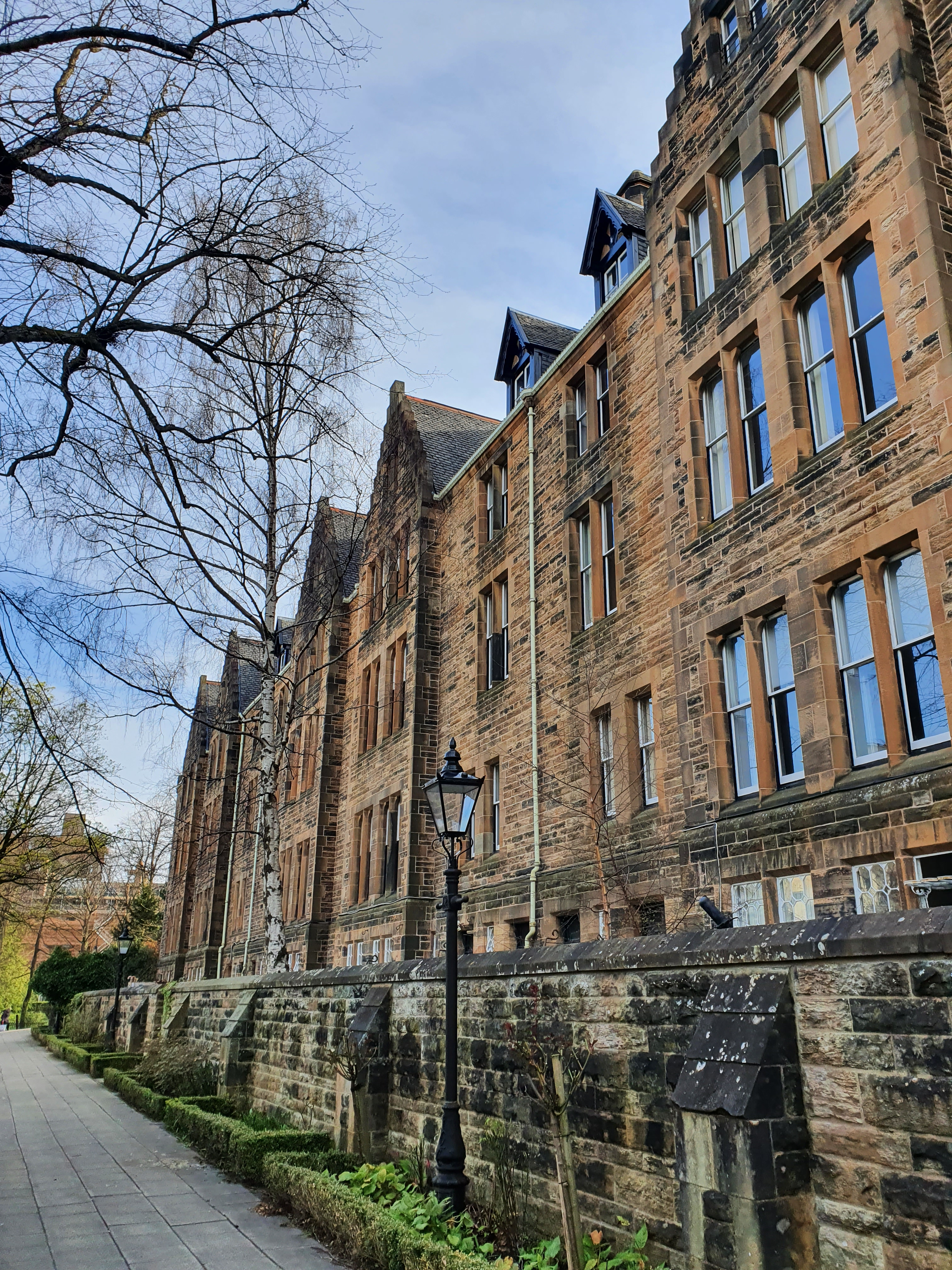
- The Stair Building
- Type: Law school
- Established: December 1713; 312 years ago (Regius Chair of Law)
- Affiliations: University of Glasgow
- Head: Professor Claire McDiarmid
- Academic staff: 148
- Administrative staff: 31
- Students: 1,613
- Undergraduates: 939
- Postgraduates: 674
- Location: Glasgow, Scotland
Colours
- Website: gla.ac.uk/law/

The School of Law at the University of Glasgow provides undergraduate and postgraduate courses in Law, and awards the degrees of Bachelor of Laws (Legum Baccalaureus, LLB), Master of Laws (Iuris Vtriusque Magistrum, LLM), LLM by Research, Master of Research (MRes) and Doctor of Philosophy (Philosophiæ Doctor, PhD), the degree of Doctor of Laws being awarded generally only as an honorary degree.

There are forty-nine full-time academic staff and over one thousand students. As of 2024 the Head of the School of Law is Professor Claire McDiarmid.

The 2019 Complete University Guide league rankings placed Glasgow at 2nd in the UK. The 2023 rankings from The Guardian placed Glasgow at 6th in the UK. The 2024 The Times league rankings placed Glasgow at 7th in the UK.

== History ==
At the university's foundation in 1451, there were four original faculties: Arts, Divinity, Law and Medicine. Both Canon and Civil Law were taught, however by the sixteenth Century, instruction in both of these had fallen out of practice. It was during this time that James Dalrymple of Stair came to Glasgow to study for an MA (1633–1637) and then became a regent (1641–1647) teaching philosophy. He went on to become Lord President of the Court of Session in 1671, and published his Institutions of the Law of Scotland in 1681, the first systematic exposition of Scots Law. The Stair Building, where the School of Law is housed, is named in his honour.

In 1713, Queen Anne endowed the Regius Chair of Law at the university. The first occupant of the Chair (from 1714) was William Forbes, and subsequent notable Professors have included John Millar, William Gloag, David Walker and Joe Thomson. This revived the teaching of Law at Glasgow, and subsequent Chairs included the Chair of Conveyancing, established in 1861 by the Faculty of Procurators; the Douglas Chair of Civil Law in 1948; the Chair in Jurisprudence (1952); in Public Law (1965); and the John Millar Chair of Law in 1985, named for the previously mentioned Regius Professor of Law.

In 1984, the Faculty of Law became the Faculty of Law and Financial Studies, and in 1992, the individual legal departments were grouped together into the School. In 2005, the Faculty merged with the Faculty of Social Sciences, becoming the Faculty of Law, Business and Social Sciences. On 1 August 2010 the Faculty of Law, Business and Social Science was combined with the Adam Smith Business School, the School of Social and Political Studies, the School of Education and the School of Interdisciplinary Studies into a new College of Social Sciences.

== Academia ==
Rankings
National rankings
- Complete (2027): 7
- Guardian (2027): 6
- Times / Sunday Times (2027): 3

Global rankings
- ARWU (2026): 201-300
- QS (2027): 56
- THE (2026): 63

The School of Law is housed in the Stair Building (named for Viscount Stair), a row of internally connected terraced houses on The Square opposite the University Chapel. The School is associated with traditional Scots law teaching and with internationally recognised research across a wide range of subjects including Corporate Law and Financial Regulation, Intellectual Property Law, and Law and Security.

=== CREATe ===
CREATe is the AHRC research centre for Regulation of the Creative Economy. Until 2024, CREATe was known as the RCUK research centre for copyright and new business models in the creative economy. The University of Glasgow, led a consortium of 7 Universities which also comprises the University of East Anglia, the University of Edinburgh, Goldsmiths (University of London), University of Nottingham, University of St Andrews and the University of Strathclyde. CREATe was supported by £5m of funding over four years (2012–2016) from the Arts and Humanities Research Council (AHRC), Engineering and Physical Sciences Research Council (EPSRC) and the Economic and Social Research Council (ESRC). Since 2024, the centre is supported by an AHRC infrastructure award. Its work takes places across seven themes: Automation, decentralisation and platforms, Access to knowledge, Dealing with creators, Political economy of regulation, The law of innovation, Legal history and cultural memory, and Technology and humanism.

=== Chairs ===
The following chairs of the university have provinces within the School of Law:

- Regius Chair of Law: James Chalmers
- Douglas Chair in Civil Law: Ernest Metzger
- Alexander Stone Professor of Commercial Law: Irene-marié Esser
- John Millar Professor of Law: Adam Tomkins

== Students ==
Students in the School of Law elect class representatives from each of their classes to represent them at meetings of committees within the School of Law. The School comes within the College of Social Science constituency on the Students' Representative Council.

=== Law Society ===
The Glasgow University Law Society organises social activities for students at the School of Law, including the annual Law Ball, held every February. The event is of a comparable size to the GUSA Ball, and because of the number of students attending it is necessary to hold the event in city centre hotels as there is no hall in the university large enough to accommodate it. The Society co-ordinate various different events, focusing around being either social, academic or charity, headed by their respective Convenor. Membership is open to all students of the School of Law, and the Society is affiliated to the SRC.

The Society publishes the Glasgow University Law Review, an annual publication containing legal articles written by members of the Society.

=== Mooting ===
The School of Law has a student-run Mooting Society, which runs an internal competition, The Dean's Cup, as well as organising the Alexander Stone National Legal Debate. All Scottish universities offering the LLB are entitled to enter this, although the competition is generally between Dundee, Edinburgh, Glasgow and Strathclyde universities. The final is held in February or March each year in the Alexander Stone Court Room on the ground floor of the Stair Building. University of Strathclyde currently holds the trophy.

The Sheriff's Cup, organised by Glasgow Sheriff Court, is an inter-varsity event held between Glasgow and Strathclyde and judged by a Senator of the College of Justice. The moot is held annually and takes place in one of the larger court rooms at Glasgow Sheriff Court. The team of Craig MacLeod and Christopher Rae led Glasgow to victory in 2016, with the moot judged by Lord Matthews.

== Notable alumni and staff ==
=== Alumni ===
Alumni of the School of Law include, the first woman appointed to the Scottish Bench, five current judges of the Court of Session (including the present Lord Justice Clerk, Lord Gill), two Law Lords, six Lord presidents, twelve Lord Advocates, a Justice of the Supreme Court of the United Kingdom and a Lord Chancellor, as well the first First Minister of Scotland, the current First Minister, and a Speaker of the House of Commons of Canada.

Law

- Harald Leslie, Lord Birsay, Chairman of the Scottish Land Court
- Iain Bonomy, Lord Bonomy, Senator of the College of Justice and Judge of the International Criminal Tribunal for the former Yugoslavia
- Matthew Clarke, Lord Clarke, Senator of the College of Justice
- Hazel Cosgrove, Lady Cosgrove, first female Senator of the College of Justice (retired)
- Charles Dickson, Lord Dickson, Lord Advocate and Lord President of the Court of Session
- Donald Findlay QC, advocate
- George Emslie, Lord Emslie, Lord President of the Court of Session
- Henry Erskine, Lord Advocate
- Thomas Miller, Lord Glenlee, Lord Advocate and Lord President of the Court of Session, and Rector of the University of Glasgow
- John Inglis, Lord Glencorse, Lord Advocate and Lord President of the Court of Session, and Rector of the University of Glasgow
- Brian Gill, Lord Gill, Lord Justice Clerk
- Ian Hamilton, advocate, Scottish Nationalist
- Lord Irvine of Lairg, Lord Chancellor
- Douglas Jamieson, Lord Jamieson, Lord Advocate and Senator of the College of Justice
- Lord Jauncey of Tullichettle, Lord of Appeal in Ordinary
- Roderick Macdonald, Lord Uist, Senator of the College of Justice
- Hugh Macmillan, Baron Macmillan, Lord Advocate and Lord of Appeal in Ordinary
- Alexander Munro MacRobert, Lord Advocate
- Gerry Maher, Professor of Criminal Law at the University of Edinburgh, Law Commissioner
- Hugh Matthews, Lord Matthews, Senator of the College of Justice
- Robin McEwan, Lord McEwan, Senator of the College of Justice
- William Rankine Milligan, Lord Milligan, Lord Advocate and Senator of the College of Justice
- Ann Paton, Lady Paton, Senator of the College of Justice
- Lord Rodger of Earlsferry, Justice of the Supreme Court of the United Kingdom
- Alexander Ure, 1st Baron Strathclyde, Lord Advocate and Lord President of the Court of Session
- Alan Watson, Civil Law scholar (former Douglas Professor of Civil Law)
- Lord Wilson of Langside, Lord Advocate and Senator of the College of Justice
- Lord Wheatley, Lord Advocate and Lord Justice Clerk, established Scottish Legal Aid system
- Norman Wylie, Lord Wylie, Lord Advocate and Senator of the College of Justice
- María Elósegui, Judge at the European Court of Human Rights

Politics

- Des Browne QC MP, former Secretary of State for Defence and Secretary of State for Scotland
- Sir Menzies Campbell, former Leader of the Liberal Democrats
- Donald Dewar, former First Minister of Scotland
- Annabelle Ewing, former Member of Parliament for Perth
- Fergus Ewing, Minister for Community Safety in the Scottish Parliament
- Tam Galbraith, former Member of Parliament for Glasgow Hillhead
- James Allison Glen, former Speaker of the House of Commons of Canada
- Robert Stevenson Horne, former Chancellor of the Exchequer
- John Lamont, Member of Parliament (MP) for Berwickshire, Roxburgh and Selkirk
- John Smith, former Leader of the Labour Party
- Nicola Sturgeon, former First Minister of Scotland

Other professions

- Gerard Butler, actor
- Duncan Inglis Cameron, former Secretary of Heriot-Watt University
- Sir William Kerr Fraser, former Principal and Chancellor of the University
- Fred Goodwin, former Chief Executive of the Royal Bank of Scotland
- Katherine Grainger, 2012 Olympic Gold Medallist
- Sir James Guthrie, former President of the Royal Scottish Academy
- John Keenan, Catholic Bishop of Paisley
- Denise Mina, author
- Kevin Sneader, global managing partner of McKinsey & Company

=== Staff ===
- Elspeth Attwooll, Member of the European Parliament for Scotland (former lecturer in Jurisprudence)
- Andrew Dewar Gibb, former Leader of the Scottish National Party (former Regius Professor of Law)
- William Gloag, co-author of The Law of Scotland (Gloag and Henderson) (former Regius Professor of Law)
- Sheila McLean, Director of the School of Law's Institute of Law and Ethics in Medicine
- John Millar, philosopher, economist (former Regius Professor of Law)
- Robert Reed, Lord Reed, Justice of the Supreme Court of the United Kingdom (Honorary Professor)
- David Walker, Private Law scholar (former Regius Professor of Law)
- Alan Watson, Civil Law scholar (former Douglas Professor of Civil Law)
