= Roberto =

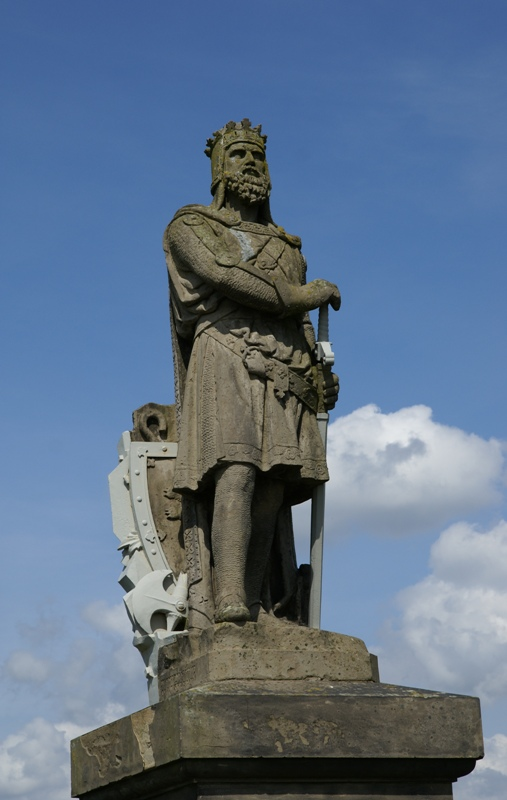

Roberto is an Italian, Portuguese and Spanish variation of the male given name Robert.

Notable people named Roberto include:

- Roberto (footballer, born 1912)
- Roberto (footballer, born 1977)
- Roberto (footballer, born 1978)
- Roberto (footballer, born 1979)
- Roberto (footballer, born 1988)
- Roberto (footballer, born January 1990)
- Roberto (footballer, born December 1990)
- Roberto (footballer, born 1998)
- Roberto Abbondanzieri (born 1972), Argentine footballer
- Roberto Acuña (born 1972), Paraguayan footballer
- Roberto Alagna (born 1963), French operatic tenor
- Roberto Alomar (born 1968), Puerto Rican baseball player
- Roberto Alvarado (born 1998), Mexican footballer
- Roberto Amadio (born 1963), Italian cyclist
- Roberto d'Amico (born 1967), Belgian politician
- Roberto Ayala (born 1973), Argentine footballer
- Roberto Badiani (born 1949), Italian footballer
- Roberto Baggio (born 1967), Italian footballer
- Roberto Ballini (born 1944), Italian footballer
- Roberto Baronio (born 1977), Italian footballer
- Roberto Bellarmino (1542–1621), Italian Catholic bishop
- Roberto Bettega (born 1950), Italian footballer
- Roberto Blanco (born 1937), German singer and actor
- Roberto Blanco (actor) (1903–1965), Argentine stage and film actor
- Roberto Blanco (footballer) (1938–2011), Argentine footballer
- Roberto Bolle (born 1975), Italian ballet dancer
- Roberto Boninsegna (born 1943), Italian footballer
- Roberto Brunamonti (born 1959), Italian basketballer
- Roberto Cammarelle (born 1980), Italian boxer
- Roberto Carlos (disambiguation), several people, including:
  - Roberto Carlos (born 1973), Brazilian footballer
- Roberto Chiacig (born 1974), Italian basketballer
- Roberto Chiappa (born 1973), Italian cyclist
- Roberto Cidade (born 1986), Brazilian politician
- Roberto Clemente (1934–1972), Puerto Rican baseball player
- Roberto Cravero (born 1964), Italian footballer
- Roberto Del Castello (born 1957), Italian auto racing driver
- Roberto De Vicenzo (1923–2017), Argentine golfer
- Roberto De Vito (1867–1959), Italian jurist and politician
- Roberto De Zerbi (born 1979), Italian footballer
- Roberto Di Donna (born 1968), Italian Olympic pistol shooter
- Roberto Di Matteo (born 1970), Italian football manager and former footballer
- Roberto Donadoni (born 1963), Italian coach and footballer
- Roberto Durán (born 1951), Panamanian boxer
- Roberto Emílio da Cunha (1912–1977), Brazilian footballer
- Roberto Firmino (born 1991), Brazilian footballer
- Roberto Galia (born 1963), Italian coach and footballer
- Roberto Heras, Spanish cyclist
- Roberto Hernández (disambiguation), several people
- Roberto Jiménez (footballer, born 1986), Spanish footballer
- Roberto Lavagna (born 1942), Argentine economist and politician
- Roberto Lerici (1924–2004), Italian coach and footballer
- Roberto Locatelli, Italian motorcyclist
- Roberto Luongo (born 1979), Canadian ice hockey player
- Roberto Maltagliati, Italian footballer
- Roberto Mancini (born 1964), Italian football manager and former footballer
- Roberto Martinez (disambiguation), several people, including:
  - Roberto Martínez (born 1973), Spanish football manager and former footballer
- Roberto Mazzotta (born 1940), Italian economist and politician
- Roberto Merhi (born 1991), Spanish auto racing driver
- Roberto Miranda (born 1944), Brazilian footballer
- Roberto Moreno (born 1959), Brazilian auto racing driver
- Roberto Mussi, Italian footballer
- Roberto Muzzi, Italian footballer
- Roberto Naveira (born 1970), Italian judoka
- Roberto Osuna (born 1995), Mexican baseball player
- Roberto Pérez (disambiguation), several people, including:
  - Roberto Pérez (born 1988), Puerto Rican professional baseball catcher
- Roberto Petagine, Venezuelan footballer
- Roberto Policano, Italian footballer
- Roberto Pruzzo, Italian footballer
- Roberto Rodrigo (born 1988), Portuguese footballer
- Roberto Rojas (disambiguation), several people, including:
  - Roberto Rojas, Chilean footballer
- Roberto Rolfo, Italian motorcyclist
- Roberto Rosetti, Italian football referee
- Roberto Rossellini (1906–1977), Italian film director
- Roberto Roxas (born 1946), Filipino cyclist
- Roberto Seda, American politician
- Roberto Soldado (born 1985), Spanish footballer
- Roberto Sosa (disambiguation), several people
- Roberto Strauss (born 1952), Mexican swimmer
- Roberto Tremelloni (1900–1987), Italian economist and politician
- Roberto Uy (born 1951), Filipino businessman and politician
- Roberto Visentini (born 1957), Italian cyclist
- Roberto Xalino (born 1987), Cape Verdean musician
- Roberto Zanetti (born 1956), Italian musician, also known as "Savage" or "Robyx"

== See also ==
- Robert
- Berto (disambiguation)
- Roberta (given name)
- Roberton (disambiguation)
