= Roberto (disambiguation) =

Roberto is a male given name.

Roberto may also refer to:

== Mononyms ==
- Roberto (footballer, born 1912), Brazilian striker
- Roberto (footballer, born 1973), Roberto Fresnedoso, Spanish midfielder
- Roberto (footballer, born 1977), Brazilian striker
- Roberto (footballer, born 1978), Brazilian striker
- Roberto (footballer, born 1979), Brazilian midfielder
- Roberto (footballer, born 1986), Roberto Jiménez, Spanish goalkeeper
- Roberto (footballer, born 1988), Brazilian midfielder
- Roberto (footballer, born 1998), Brazilian fullback
- Roberto (footballer, born January 1990), Brazilian goalkeeper
- Roberto (footballer, born December 1990), Brazilian fullback
- Roberto (musician) (born 1985), Zambian singer and songwriter

== People with the surname ==
- Benedito Roberto (1946–2020), Angolan Roman Catholic archbishop
- Holden Roberto (1923–2007), Angolan political figure
- JD Roberto (born 1969), American television personality, writer, host, and producer
- Marcus Aurelius Roberto (1930–1986), American politician, Democrat, member of the Ohio General Assembly
- Marisa Roberto, Italian-American neuroscientist and professor
- Paolo Roberto (born 1969), Swedish actor, television presenter, restaurateur and ex-boxer of partial Italian descent
- Phil Roberto (1949–2025), Canadian ice hockey player
- Sergi Roberto (born 1992), Spanish professional footballer
- Venancio Roberto (fl. 1898–1899), leader of a short attempted coup in Guam
- Zé Roberto (disambiguation), several people, including:
  - Zé Roberto (born 1974), Brazilian footballer

== Other uses ==
- Roberto (horse) (1969–1988), an American-bred, Irish-trained Thoroughbred Champion racehorse
- Roberto (Futurama), a fictional criminally insane, psychotic robot in the cartoon Futurama
- Roberto (Passions), a fictional minor character on the soap opera, Passions
- Roberto (Open Season 2), a fictional minor character in the Open Season cartoon film series
- Roberto: The Insect Architect, a picture book published in 2000 by Nina Laden
- "Roberto!", a 1992 episode of the television series Quantum Leap

== See also ==
- Robert (disambiguation)
- Berto (disambiguation)
- Roberta (disambiguation)
- Roberti (disambiguation)
- Roberton (disambiguation)
- De Roberto
