= Professor of Conveyancing =

Chair of Conveyancing University of Glasgow
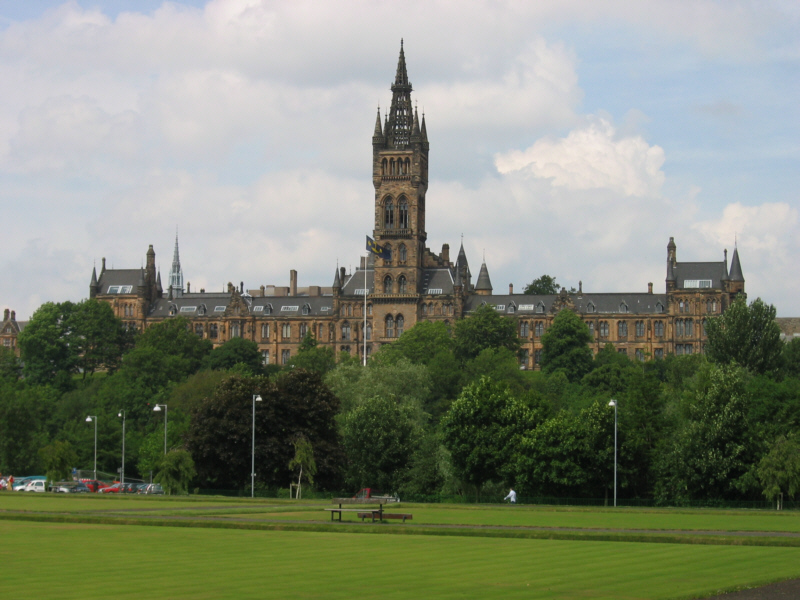
- Formation: 1861
- First holder: Anderson Kirkwood
- Website: www.law.gla.ac.uk

The Chair of Conveyancing was a Professorship at the University of Glasgow, active until 2014. It was founded in 1861 and endowed by the Faculty of Procurators in Glasgow. It was a part-time post, and holders were generally solicitors in private practice. The last holder of the post was Professor Robert Rennie, before he retired from the role in 2014.

== History ==
The chair was founded by the Faculty of Procurators, the local society of law agents of which, prior to the establishment of the Law Society of Scotland, anyone wishing to practise in the courts of Glasgow had to be a member. The faculty used to have the ability to appoint the chair, but this was recently withdrawn.

The first occupant of the chair, Anderson Kirkwood, went on to be a distinguished figure. Having founded the firm of Bannatynes & Kirkwood in 1839 in his late twenties, he was appointed to the chair in 1862, holding it until 1867. He became Secretary of Court at the university in 1874 and was elected Dean of the Faculty of Procurators the following year. In 1878, whilst Secretary of Court, he and John Veitch, the Professor of Logic and Rhetoric, raised the funds to buy the library of Sir William Hamilton, to whom Veitch had previously been an assistant in the latter's post as Professor of Logic and Metaphysics in the University of Edinburgh. He remained Dean of Faculty for five years until 1880, and Secretary of Court until 1887.

Kirkwood was succeeded in the chair by James Roberton, a partner in the firm of Roberton, Low, Roberton & Cross, now Mitchells Roberton, the oldest firm in Glasgow, and an authority on the common and statutory laws of land. He held the chair from 1867 until his death in 1889. He too was Dean of the Faculty of Procurators, from 1885 to 1889, was awarded an LLD by the university in 1868, and was knighted in 1889, shortly before his death. A portrait of him by Thomas Annan is held by the National Portrait Gallery, London. The Sir James Roberton Memorial Prize, founded in 1955, is awarded annually for distinction in the class of History of Scots Law.

The third man appointed to the chair was James Moir, of Moir, Forbes & Guy. An authority on feudal law, he was appointed to the chair in 1889 and remained in it until his death in 1915. He served for a time as Dean of the Faculty of Law and as a member of Court. The fourth occupant was William Sharp McKechnie, previously a lecturer in Constitutional Law and History and author of Magna Carta: A Commentary on the Great Charter of King John with an Historical Introduction. He held the chair until 1927, and on his retirement was awarded an honorary LLD He was replaced by John Girvan, partner in the firm of McClure, Naismith, Brodie & Co., who was elected Dean of the Faculty of Procurators in 1940, and remained in the chair until his death in 1946. The sixth Professor of Conveyancing was Donald McLeish, who had won the Roberton Scholarship in 1917. Like Professor McKechnie, McLeish was a career academic. He had been an assistant to the lecturer in Constitutional Law and History prior to his appointment in 1931 as lecturer in Evidence and Procedure. He was appointed to the Chair of Conveyancing in 1946 and became Dean of the Faculty of Law in 1950.

The seventh Professor, John Menzies Halliday, is perhaps the best known. A partner in the firm of Bishop, Milne & Boyd, now part of Brodies, he was appointed to the chair in 1955, and went on to write the authoritative four-volume Conveyancing Law and Practice; although this was published between 1985 and 1990, after he had retired from the chair in 1979. His successor in the chair was J.A.M. Inglis, partner in the same firm of McClure Naismith as Professor Girvan. He held the Chairs of Conveyancing from 1979 and of Professional Legal Practice from 1983 until his retirement from practice in 1993. He was appointed CBE in 1984 and elected Dean of the Faculty of Procurators in 1989, serving until 1992.

The last Professor, Robert Rennie, was appointed in 1993 and served until his retirement in 2014. He began his legal career as an apprentice in the firm of Bishop, Milne & Boyd where the then Professor Halliday was a partner. On his appointment to the chair in 1993 he was a partner in Ballantyne & Copland Solicitors, Motherwell and East Kilbride, and in October 2001 became a partner in Glasgow firm Harper Macleod. He was heavily involved in the reform of land law in the twenty-first century, having been a member of the Scottish Law Commission Working Parties on the Abolition of the Feudal System, Title Conditions, Tenements, Leasehold Tenure and the law relating to the Seabed and Foreshore.

== Professors of Conveyancing ==
- 1993 - Robert Rennie, (Harper Macleod)
- 1979 - James Inglis, (McClure Naismith)
- 1955 - John Menzies Halliday, (Bishop, Milne & Boyd)
- 1946 - Donald McLeish
- 1927 - John Girvan, (McClure Naismith)
- 1916 - William McKechnie
- 1889 - James Moir, (Moir, Forbes & Guy)
- 1867 - Sir James Roberton, (Roberton, Low, Roberton & Cross)
- 1862 - Anderson Kirkwood, (Bannatynes & Kirkwood)

== See also ==
- List of Professorships at the University of Glasgow
- Regius Chair of Law, Glasgow
- University of Glasgow School of Law
