= Society of Solicitors in the Supreme Courts of Scotland =

Society of Solicitors in the Supreme Court of Scotland
- Formation: 1784; 242 years ago
- Founded at: Edinburgh
- Type: Professional body
- Headquarters: 11 Parliament Square
- President: Sarah Erskine
- Website: https://www.ssclibrary.co.uk/

The Society of Solicitors in the Supreme Courts of Scotland is a voluntary professional association of solicitors in Scotland, representing lawyers who practise in and around the College of Justice. The College of Justice comprises Scotland's two supreme courts: the Court of Session and the High Court of Justiciary. Members use the abbreviation "SSC" after their names.

The Society was founded in January 1784 and incorporated by royal charter in 1797.

It is one of several similar societies in Scotland, along with the Society of Writers to the Signet in Edinburgh, the Royal Faculty of Procurators in Glasgow and the Society of Advocates in Aberdeen.
