= 2020 Sport Club Internacional season =

Internacional
2020 season
- President: Marcelo Medeiros (until December 31, 2020); Alessandro Barcellos (since January 1, 2021)
- Manager: Eduardo Coudet (until November 9, 2020); Abel Braga (since November 10, 2020)
- Stadium: Estádio Beira-Rio
- Série A: 2nd
- Campeonato Gaúcho: 3rd
- Copa Libertadores: Round of 16
- Copa do Brasil: Quarter-finals
- Top goalscorer: League: Thiago Galhardo (17); All: Thiago Galhardo (23)
| Home colours | Away colours | Third colours |

The 2020 season is Sport Club Internacional's 110th season in existence. As well as the Campeonato Brasileiro, the club competes in the Copa do Brasil, the Campeonato Gaúcho and the Copa Libertadores.

== Players ==
=== Squad information ===
Players and squad numbers last updated on 25 August 2020. Appearances include league matches only.
Note: Flags indicate national team as has been defined under FIFA eligibility rules. Players may hold more than one non-FIFA nationality.

| No. | Name | Nat | Position(s) | Date of birth (age) | Signed in | Contract ends | Signed from | Apps. | Goals |
Goalkeepers
| 1 | Danilo Fernandes | (Brazil) | GK | 3 April 1988 (age 38) | 2016 | 2021 | (Brazil) Sport Recife | 81 | 0 |
| 12 | Marcelo Lomba | (Brazil) | GK | 18 December 1986 (age 39) | 2016 | 2021 | (Brazil) EC Bahia | 64 | 0 |
| 32 | Keiller | (Brazil) | GK | 29 October 1996 (age 29) | | 2022 | (Brazil) Youth Sector | 0 | 0 |
| 42 | Daniel | (Brazil) | GK | 6 May 1994 (age 32) | 2017 | 2021 | (Brazil) Youth Sector | 4 | 0 |
Defenders
| 2 | Heitor | (Brazil) | RB | 5 November 2000 (age 25) | 2019 | 2022 | (Brazil) Youth Sector | 20 | 0 |
| 4 | Rodrigo Moledo | (Brazil) | CB | 27 October 1987 (age 38) | 2018 | 2022 | (Greece) Panathinaikos | 88 | 5 |
| 6 | Uendel | (Brazil) | LB | 8 October 1988 (age 37) | 2017 | 2021 | (Brazil) Corinthians | 59 | 1 |
| 14 | Lucas Ribeiro | (Brazil) | CB | 19 January 1999 (age 27) | 2020 | 2021 | (Germany) Hoffenheim | 0 | 0 |
| 15 | Víctor Cuesta | (Argentina) | CB | 19 November 1988 (age 37) | 2017 | 2022 | (Argentina) Independiente | 92 | 6 |
| 20 | Moisés | (Brazil) | LB | 11 March 1995 (age 31) | 2020 | 2021 | (Brazil) Bahia | 0 | 0 |
| 22 | Rodinei | (Brazil) | RB | 29 January 1992 (age 34) | 2020 | 2021 | (Brazil) Flamengo | 0 | 0 |
| 26 | Renzo Saravia | (Argentina) | RB | 16 June 1993 (age 33) | 2020 | 2021 | (Portugal) Porto | 16 | 0 |
| 35 | Zé Gabriel | (Brazil) | CB | 21 January 1999 (age 27) | | 2022 | (Brazil) Youth Sector | 1 | 0 |
| 36 | Léo Borges | (Brazil) | LB | 3 January 2001 (age 25) | | | (Brazil) Youth Sector | 0 | 0 |
| 41 | Pedro Henrique | (Brazil) | CB | 31 January 2001 (age 25) | | | (Brazil) Youth Sector | | 0 |
Midfielders
| 5 | Damián Musto | (Argentina) | DM / CM | 9 June 1987 (age 39) | 2020 | 2020 | (Spain) Huesca | 0 | 0 |
| 8 | Edenílson | (Brazil) | CM | 18 December 1989 (age 36) | 2018 | 2022 | (Italy) Udinese | 94 | 9 |
| 10 | Andrés D'Alessandro | (Argentina) | AM / LW / RW | 15 April 1981 (age 45) | 2008 | 2020 | (Argentina) San Lorenzo | 266 | 45 |
| 13 | Rodrigo Dourado | (Brazil) | DM / CM | 17 June 1994 (age 32) | 2015 | 2022 | (Brazil) Youth Sector | 119 | 2 |
| 17 | Thiago Galhardo | (Brazil) | AM | 20 July 1989 (age 37) | 2020 | 2021 | (Brazil) Ceará | 0 | 0 |
| 19 | Rodrigo Lindoso | (Brazil) | CM / DM | 6 June 1989 (age 37) | 2019 | 2021 | (Brazil) Botafogo | 27 | 4 |
| 21 | Gabriel Boschilia | (Brazil) | AM | 5 March 1996 (age 30) | 2020 | 2022 | (France) Monaco | 0 | 0 |
| 25 | Matheus Jussa | (Brazil) | DM / CM | 22 March 1996 (age 30) | 2020 | 2021 | (Brazil) Oeste | 1 | 0 |
| 27 | Maurício | (Brazil) | CM | 22 June 2001 (age 25) | 2020 | 2025 | (Brazil) Cruzeiro | 0 | 0 |
| 30 | Johnny | (United States) | AM | 20 September 2001 (age 25) | | 2022 | (Brazil) Youth Sector | 1 | 0 |
| 33 | Nonato | (Brazil) | CM | 3 March 1998 (age 28) | 2019 | 2023 | (Brazil) São Caetano | 26 | 3 |
| 45 | Bruno Praxedes | (Brazil) | CM | 8 February 2002 (age 24) | 2020 | | (Brazil) Youth Sector | 1 | 0 |
| 88 | Patrick | (Brazil) | AM / CM / RW | 29 July 1992 (age 34) | 2018 | 2022 | (Brazil) Recife | 60 | 7 |
Forwards
| 9 | Paolo Guerrero | (Peru) | CF | 1 January 1984 (age 42) | 2018 | 2021 | (Brazil) Flamengo | 24 | 10 |
| 11 | Yuri Alberto | (Brazil) | CF | 18 March 2001 (age 25) | 2020 | 2025 | (Brazil) Santos | 0 | 0 |
| 18 | Leandro Fernández | (Argentina) | ST | 12 March 1991 (age 35) | 2020 | 2021 | (Argentina) Independiente | 0 | 0 |
| 23 | Marcos Guilherme | (Brazil) | RW / RM | 5 August 1995 (age 31) | 2020 | 2022 | (Saudi Arabia) Al-Wehda | 0 | 0 |
| 31 | Peglow | (Brazil) | AM | 7 January 2002 (age 24) | 2020 | 2023 | (Brazil) Youth Sector | 0 | 0 |
| 99 | Abel Hernández | (Uruguay) | ST | 8 August 1990 (age 36) | 2020 | 2021 | (Qatar) Al Ahli | 0 | 0 |

== Transfers ==
=== In ===
| Date | Pos. | Player | Age | Moving from | Fee | Notes | Source |
|---|---|---|---|---|---|---|---|
| 8 January 2020 | MF | (Brazil) Thiago Galhardo | 30 | (Brazil) Ceará | Free | | |
| 12 January 2020 | MF | (Brazil) Marcos Guilherme | 24 | (Saudi Arabia) Al-Wehda | Free | contract until 2022 | |
| 28 January 2020 | MF | (Brazil) Gabriel Boschilia | 23 | (France) Monaco | | contract until 2022 | |
| 3 August 2020 | FW | (Brazil) Yuri Alberto | 19 | (Brazil) Santos | Free | contract until 2025 | |
| 28 August 2020 | FW | (Uruguay) Abel Hernández | 30 | (Qatar) Al Ahli | Free | contract until 2021 | |
| 3 September 2020 | FW | (Argentina) Leandro Fernández | 29 | (Argentina) Independiente | Free | contract until 2021 | |
| 1 September 2020 | FW | (Brazil) Pedro Lucas | 22 | (Brazil) Figueirense | Loan Return | | |
| 7 September 2020 | DF | (Brazil) Thales | 19 | (Brazil) Paraná | Loan Return | | |
| 1 November 2020 | MF | (Brazil) Maurício | 27 | (Brazil) Cruzeiro | | contract until 2025 | |

=== Loans in ===
| Date | Pos. | Player | Age | Moving from | Fee | Notes | Source |
|---|---|---|---|---|---|---|---|
| 1 January 2020 | MF | (Argentina) Damián Musto | 32 | (Spain) Huesca | N/A | | |
| 1 January 2020 | DF | (Brazil) Rodinei | 27 | (Brazil) Flamengo | N/A | | |
| 15 January 2020 | DF | (Brazil) Moisés | 24 | (Brazil) Bahia | N/A | | |
| 18 February 2020 | FW | (Brazil) Gustavo | 25 | (Brazil) Corinthians | N/A | | |
| 28 February 2020 | DF | (Argentina) Renzo Saravia | 26 | (Portugal) Porto | N/A | | |
| 2 July 2020 | MF | (Brazil) Matheus Jussa | 24 | (Brazil) Oeste | N/A | contract until May 2021 | |
| 10 August 2020 | DF | (Brazil) Lucas Ribeiro | 21 | (Germany) Hoffenheim | N/A | contract until December 2021 | |

=== Out ===
| Date | Pos. | Player | Age | Moving to | Fee | Notes | Source |
|---|---|---|---|---|---|---|---|
| 9 December 2019 | FW | (Uruguay) Nicolás López | 26 | (Mexico) Tigres | $10 million | | |
| 16 December 2019 | MF | (Brazil) Juan Alano | 23 | (Japan) Kashima Antlers | | | |
| 31 December 2019 | MF | (Brazil) Charles | 23 | (Brazil) Ceará | R$3 million | Two-year contract | |
| 31 January 2020 | MF | (Brazil) Wellington Silva | 27 | (Brazil) Fluminense | N/A | Early termination of loan | |
| 31 June 2020 | FW | (Brazil) Gustavo | 25 | (Brazil) Corinthians | Loan Return | | |
| 7 July 2020 | DF | (Brazil) Erik | 19 | (United Arab Emirates) Al Ain | $4 million | | |
| 25 August 2020 | DF | (Brazil) Bruno Fuchs | 21 | (Russia) CSKA Moscow | €8 million | €1.5 million in add-ons | |
| 10 September 2020 | DF | (Brazil) Thales | 27 | (Turkey) Ankaraspor | Free | N/A | |
| 1 November 2020 | FW | (Brazil) William Pottker | 26 | (Brazil) Cruzeiro | | | |

==== Loans out ====
| Date | Pos. | Player | Age | Moving to | Fee | Notes | Source |
|---|---|---|---|---|---|---|---|
| 1 January 2020 | DF | (Brazil) Dudu | 23 | (Brazil) Atlético Goianiense | N/A | Until 31 December 2020 | |
| 1 January 2020 | MF | (Brazil) Valdívia | 26 | (Brazil) Avaí | N/A | Until 31 December 2020 | |
| 3 January 2020 | MF | (Brazil) Gustavo Ferrareis | 24 | (Brazil) Atlético Goianiense | N/A | Until 31 December 2020 | |
| 15 January 2020 | DF | (Brazil) Zeca | 26 | (Brazil) Bahia | N/A | Until 31 December 2020 | |
| 1 February 2020 | FW | (Brazil) Brenner | 21 | (Japan) Iwate Grulla Morioka | N/A | Until 1 January 2021 | |
| 8 September 2020 | FW | (Brazil) Pedro Lucas | 22 | (Brazil) CSA | N/A | Until 31 January 2021 | |
| 12 September 2020 | DF | (Brazil) Natanael | 29 | (Brazil) Atlético Goianiense | N/A | Until 25 February 2021 | |
| 14 September 2020 | MF | (Brazil) Richard | 21 | (Portugal) Belenenses SAD | N/A | Until 30 June 2021 | |
| 16 September 2020 | DF | (Brazil) Roberto | 22 | (Brazil) Paraná | N/A | Until 31 January 2021 | |
| 17 September 2020 | MF | (Argentina) Martín Sarrafiore | 23 | (Brazil) Coritiba | N/A | Until 25 February 2021 | |
| 16 October 2020 | FW | (Brazil) Bruno José | 22 | (Brazil) Brasil de Pelotas | N/A | Until 31 January 2021 | |
| 1 November 2020 | FW | (Brazil) Guilherme Pato | 19 | (Brazil) Ponte Preta | N/A | Until 31 January 2021 | |

== Competitions ==
=== Overview ===
| Competition | First match | Last match | Starting round | Final position | Record | | | | | | | |
| Competition | First match | Last match | Starting round | Final position | Pld | W | D | L | GF | GA | GD | Win % |
|---|---|---|---|---|---|---|---|---|---|---|---|---|
| Série A | 8 August 2020 | 25 February 2021 | Matchday 1 | Runners-up | 38 | 20 | 10 | 8 | 61 | 35 | +26 | 52.63 |
| Copa do Brasil | 29 October 2020 | 19 November 2020 | Round of 16 | Quarter-Finals | 4 | 3 | 0 | 1 | 5 | 3 | +2 | 75.00 |
| Campeonato Gaúcho | 23 January 2020 | 5 August 2020 | Matchday 1 | 3rd Place | 14 | 8 | 3 | 3 | 24 | 11 | +13 | 57.14 |
| Copa Libertadores | 4 February 2020 | 9 December 2020 | Second Stage | Round of 16 | 12 | 5 | 4 | 3 | 12 | 7 | +5 | 41.67 |
| Total | | | | | 68 | 36 | 17 | 15 | 102 | 56 | +46 | 52.94 |

Source: Competitions

=== Campeonato Gaúcho ===
For the 2020 Campeonato Gaúcho, the 12 teams are divided into two groups. In the first group phase, teams play against those in the same group. In the second group phase, teams will play against teams in the other group. In each group phase, the top two teams in each group will advance to the semi-finals.

==== First Phase - Group A ====
| Pos | Team | Pld | W | D | L | GF | GA | GD | Pts | Qualification or relegation |
|---|---|---|---|---|---|---|---|---|---|---|
| 1 | Internacional | 5 | 4 | 1 | 0 | 10 | 4 | +6 | 13 | Advance to Final phase |
| 2 | Ypiranga | 5 | 3 | 2 | 0 | 4 | 1 | +3 | 11 | Advance to Final phase |
| 3 | Juventude | 5 | 1 | 2 | 2 | 4 | 5 | −1 | 5 | |
| 4 | São Luiz | 5 | 1 | 1 | 3 | 8 | 10 | −2 | 4 | |
| 5 | Pelotas | 5 | 1 | 1 | 3 | 7 | 10 | −3 | 4 | |
| 6 | Novo Hamburgo | 5 | 0 | 3 | 2 | 0 | 3 | −3 | 3 | |

Updated to match(es) played on 9 February 2020. Source: Standings
Rules for classification: 1) Points; 2) Wins; 3) Goal difference; 4) Goals scored; 5) Head-to-head; 6) Disciplinary record.

===== Matches =====
| 23 January 2020 1 | Juventude | 0–1 | Internacional | Caxias do Sul |
| | | Report | Thiago Galhardo 17' (pen.) | Stadium: Estádio Alfredo Jaconi; Referee: Anderson Daronco |

| 26 January 2020 2 | Internacional | 3–1 | Pelotas | Porto Alegre |
| | Edenílson 25'; D'Alessandro 59'; Guerrero 70' | Report | Chaves 83' | Stadium: Estádio Beira-Rio; Attendance: 18,182; Referee: Douglas Schwengber Da Silva |

| 29 January 2020 3 | São Luiz | 3–4 | Internacional | Ijuí |
| | Michel 1', 88'; Tássio 58' | Report | Thiago Galhardo 21'; Rodrigo Moledo 37'; D'Alessandro 45+1'; Edenílson 64' | Stadium: Estádio 19 de Outubro; Referee: Erico Andrade de Carvalho |

| 1 February 2020 4 | Ypiranga | 0–0 | Internacional | Erechim |
| | | Report | | Stadium: Colosso da Lagoa; Referee: Eder Davi Zanella |

| 8 February 2020 5 | Internacional | 2–0 | Novo Hamburgo | Porto Alegre |
| | Heitor 44'; Marcos Guilherme 79' | Report | | Stadium: Estádio Beira-Rio; Attendance: 8,812; Referee: Vinicius Gomes do Amara |

=== Semifinal ===
| 15 February 2020 | Internacional | 0–1 | Grêmio | Porto Alegre |
| | | Report | Diego Souza 91' | Stadium: Estádio Beira-Rio; Attendance: 37,157; Referee: Jean Pierre Lima |

==== Second Phase - Group A ====
| Pos | Team | Pld | W | D | L | GF | GA | GD | Pts | Qualification |
|---|---|---|---|---|---|---|---|---|---|---|
| 1 | Internacional | 6 | 3 | 2 | 1 | 10 | 4 | +6 | 11 | Advance to Final phase |
| 2 | Novo Hamburgo | 6 | 2 | 2 | 2 | 5 | 5 | 0 | 8 | Advance to Final phase |
| 3 | Juventude | 6 | 2 | 1 | 3 | 5 | 7 | −2 | 7 | |
| 4 | São Luiz | 6 | 1 | 1 | 4 | 4 | 7 | −3 | 4 | |
| 5 | Pelotas | 6 | 1 | 1 | 4 | 4 | 8 | −4 | 4 | |
| 6 | Ypiranga | 6 | 0 | 4 | 2 | 6 | 11 | −5 | 4 | |

Updated to match(es) played on 1 August 2020. Source: FGF, Flashscore
Rules for classification: 1) Points; 2) Wins; 3) Goal difference; 4) Goals scored; 5) Head-to-head; 6) Disciplinary record.

===== Matches =====
| 29 February 2020 1 | Caxias | 1–1 | Internacional | Caxias do Sul |
| | Laércio 81' | Report | 31' (pen.) Thiago Galhardo | Stadium: Estádio Centenário; Referee: Douglas Schwengber da Silva |

| 9 March 2020 2 | Internacional | 2–0 | Brasil de Pelotas | Porto Alegre |
| | Patrick 61', 68' | Report | | Stadium: Estádio Beira-Rio; Attendance: 15,536; Referee: Vinicius Amaral |

| 15 March 2020 3 | São José | 1–4 | Internacional | Porto Alegre |
| | Rafael Goiano 90' | Report | 34' Edenílson; 38', 75' Nonato; 82' (pen.) Thiago Galhardo | Stadium: Estádio Francisco Novelletto Neto; Referee: Eleno Gonzalez Todeschini |

| 22 July 2020 4 | Internacional | 0–1 | Grêmio | Porto Alegre |
| | Musto (yellow card) 25'; Cuesta (yellow card) 38'; Rodrigo (yellow card) 55'; Marcos Guilherme (yellow card) 72' | | Matheus Henrique (yellow card) 16'; Jean Pyerre 63'; Pepê (yellow card) 80' | Stadium: Estádio Beira-Rio; Attendance: 0 |

| 25 July 2020 5 | Esportivo | 1–1 | Internacional | Bento Gonçalves |
| | João Pedro 37' (pen.), (yellow card) 82'; Robert (yellow card) 40' | | Roberto Rosa (yellow card) 32'; Pottker 41' (pen.); Patrick (yellow card) 42' | Stadium: Estádio Parque Esportivo Montanha dos Vinhedos; Attendance: 0 |

| 29 July 2020 6 | Internacional | 2–0 | Aimoré | Porto Alegre |
| | Guerrero 19', 61' | | Mardley (yellow card) 57'; Wagner (yellow card) 84' | Stadium: Estádio Beira-Rio |

=== Semifinal ===
| 2 August 2020 | Internacional | 4–0 | Esportivo | Porto Alegre |
| | | | | Stadium: Estádio Beira-Rio |

=== Final ===
| 5 August 2020 | Grêmio | 2–0 | Internacional | Porto Alegre |
| | | | | Stadium: Arena do Grêmio |

=== Campeonato Brasileiro Série A ===
==== League table ====
| Pos | Team | Pld | W | D | L | GF | GA | GD | Pts | Qualification or relegation |
|---|---|---|---|---|---|---|---|---|---|---|
| 1 | Flamengo (C) | 38 | 21 | 8 | 9 | 68 | 48 | +20 | 71 | Qualification for Copa Libertadores group stage |
| 2 | Internacional | 38 | 20 | 10 | 8 | 61 | 35 | +26 | 70 | Qualification for Copa Libertadores group stage |
| 3 | Atlético Mineiro | 38 | 20 | 8 | 10 | 64 | 45 | +19 | 68 | Qualification for Copa Libertadores group stage |
| 4 | São Paulo | 38 | 18 | 12 | 8 | 59 | 41 | +18 | 66 | Qualification for Copa Libertadores group stage |
| 5 | Fluminense | 38 | 18 | 10 | 10 | 55 | 42 | +13 | 64 | Qualification for Copa Libertadores group stage |

Source: CBF
Rules for classification: 1) points; 2) wins; 3) goal difference; 4) goals scored; 5) head-to-head results (only between 2 teams); 6) fewest red cards; 7) fewest yellow cards; 8) draw.
(C) Champions

==== Results summary ====
| Overall | | | | | | | | Home | | | | | | Away | | | | | |
| Pld | W | D | L | GF | GA | GD | Pts | W | D | L | GF | GA | GD | W | D | L | GF | GA | GD |
|---|---|---|---|---|---|---|---|---|---|---|---|---|---|---|---|---|---|---|---|
| 38 | 20 | 10 | 8 | 61 | 35 | +26 | 70 | 12 | 5 | 2 | 34 | 17 | +17 | 8 | 5 | 6 | 27 | 18 | +9 |

Last updated: 25 February 2021.
Source: Competitive matches

==== Results by round ====
| Round | 1 | 2 | 3 | 4 | 5 | 6 | 7 | 8 | 9 | 10 | 11 | 12 | 13 | 14 | 15 | 16 | 17 | 18 | 19 | 20 | 21 | 22 | 23 | 24 | 25 | 26 | 27 | 28 | 29 | 30 | 31 | 32 | 33 | 34 | 35 | 36 | 37 | 38 |
|---|---|---|---|---|---|---|---|---|---|---|---|---|---|---|---|---|---|---|---|---|---|---|---|---|---|---|---|---|---|---|---|---|---|---|---|---|---|---|
| Ground | A | H | A | H | H | A | A | H | H | A | A | H | A | A | H | A | H | H | A | H | A | A | H | H | A | A | H | H | A | H | A | H | H | A | H | A | A | H |
| Result | W | W | L | W | W | W | D | D | W | L | L | D | D | W | W | W | W | D | L | D | L | L | D | D | W | W | W | W | W | W | W | W | W | D | L | W | L | D |
| Position | 5 | 2 | 3 | 2 | 1 | 1 | 1 | 1 | 1 | 1 | 2 | 2 | 2 | 2 | 2 | 2 | 1 | 1 | 1 | 1 | 2 | 4 | 4 | 6 | 5 | 4 | 4 | 2 | 2 | 2 | 1 | 1 | 1 | 1 | 1 | 1 | 2 | 2 |

Source: CBF.com

==== Matches ====
| 8 August 2020 1 | Coritiba | 0–1 | Internacional | Curitiba |
| 19:30 UTC−3 | Wellissol (yellow card) 66'; Sassá (yellow card) 75'; Rodolfo Filemon (yellow card) 81' | Report | Saravia (yellow card) 15'; Bruno Fuchs (yellow card) 47'; Cuesta (yellow card) 58'; Praxedes (yellow card) 65'; Guerrero 71' | Stadium: Estádio Couto Pereira; Attendance: 0 Referee: Bruno Arleu de Araujo |

| 13 August 2020 2 | Internacional | 2–0 | Santos | Porto Alegre |
| 19:30 UTC−3 | Edenílson (yellow card) 55', (goal) 87'; Guerrero 56'; Moisés (yellow card) 77' | Report | Veríssimo (yellow card) 73'; Kaio (yellow card) 78' | Stadium: Estádio Beira-Rio; Attendance: 0 Referee: Marcelo de Lima Henrique |

| 16 August 2020 3 | Fluminense | 2–1 | Internacional | Rio de Janeiro |
| 18:00 UTC−3 | Dodi (yellow card) 22'; Nenê 38' (pen.), 76' (pen.); Nino (yellow card) 46' | Report | Guerrero 27'; Boschilia (yellow card) 56'; Edenílson (yellow card) 83' | Stadium: Maracanã; Attendance: 0 Referee: Raphael Claus |

| 19 August 2020 4 | Internacional | 3–0 | Atlético Goianiense | Porto Alegre |
| 20:30 UTC−3 | Musto (yellow card) 11', (goal) 51'; Matheus (yellow card) 43'; Thiago 68', 89' (pen.); Marcelo (yellow card) 79' | Report | Éder (yellow card) 21'; Everton Felipe (yellow card) 55'; Jean (yellow card) 88' | Stadium: Estádio Beira-Rio; Attendance: 0 Referee: Wagner Reway |

| 22 August 2020 5 | Internacional | 1–0 | Atlético Mineiro | Porto Alegre |
| 19:00 UTC−3 | Thiago 7'; Marcos Guilherme (yellow card) 58' | Report | Jair (yellow card) 30'; Júnior Alonso (yellow card) 72' | Stadium: Estádio Beira-Rio; Attendance: 0 Referee: Luiz Flavio de Oliveira |

| 29 August 2020 6 | Botafogo | 0–2 | Internacional | Rio de Janeiro |
| 16:00 UTC−3 | Caio (yellow card) 31'; Pedro Raúl (yellow card) 55'; Matheus Babi (yellow card) 64' | Report | Thiago 5'; Gabriel 28'; D'Alessandro (yellow card) 35' | Stadium: Estádio Nilton Santos; Attendance: 0 Referee: Thiago Duarte Peixoto |

| 2 September 2020 7 | Palmeiras | 1–1 | Internacional | São Paulo |
| 21:30 UTC−3 | Luiz Adriano 95' | Report | Thiago Galhardo 91' | Stadium: Allianz Parque; Attendance: 0 Referee: Wilton Pereira Sampaio |

| 6 September 2020 8 | Internacional | 2–2 | Bahia | Porto Alegre |
| 16:00 UTC−3 | Patrick 27'; Thiago Galhardo 67' | Report | Rodriguinho 19'; Clayson 96' | Stadium: Estádio Beira-Rio; Attendance: 0 Referee: Braulio da Silva Machado |

| 10 September 2020 9 | Internacional | 2–0 | Ceará | Porto Alegre |
| 19:15 UTC−3 | Thiago Galhardo 43'; Thiago Galhardo 75' | Report | | Stadium: Estádio Beira-Rio; Attendance: 0 Referee: Rodrigo Dalonso Ferreira |

| 13 September 2020 10 | Goiás | 1–0 | Internacional | Goiânia |
| 18:00 UTC−3 | | Report | | Stadium: Hailé Pinheiro; Attendance: 0 Referee: Flavio Rodrigues de Souza |

| 19 September 2020 11 | Fortaleza | 1–0 | Internacional | Fortaleza |
| 19:00 UTC−3 | Luis 65' | Report | | Stadium: Arena Castelão; Attendance: 0 Referee: Marielson Alves Silva |

| 26 September 2020 12 | Internacional | 1–1 | São Paulo | Porto Alegre |
| 19:00 UTC−3 | Thiago Galhardo 19' | Report | Luciano 25' | Stadium: Estádio Beira-Rio; Attendance: 0 Referee: Marcelo de Lima Henrique |

| 3 October 2020 13 | Grêmio | 1–1 | Internacional | Porto Alegre |
| 17:00 UTC−3 | Pepe 67' | Report | Thiago Galhardo 74' | Stadium: Arena do Grêmio; Attendance: 0 Referee: Raphael Claus |

| 8 October 2020 14 | Red Bull Bragantino | 0–2 | Internacional | Bragança Paulista |
| 21:00 UTC−3 | | Report | Thiago Galhardo 17', 25' | Stadium: Nabi Abi Chedid; Attendance: 0 Referee: Felipe Fernandes de Lima |

| 11 October 2020 15 | Internacional | 2–1 | Athletico Paranaense | Porto Alegre |
| 20:30 UTC−3 | Thiago Galhardo 6'; Abel Hernández 36' | Report | Renato Kayzer 41' | Stadium: Estádio Beira-Rio; Attendance: 0 Referee: Bruno Arleu de Araujo |

| 14 October 2020 16 | Sport Recife | 3–5 | Internacional | Recife |
| 21:30 UTC−3 | Marquinhos 43'; Leandro Barcia 55'; Mikael 90' | Report | Patrick 34', 65'; Adryelson(c) 39'; Rodrigo Moledo 52'; Yuri Alberto 80' | Stadium: Ilha do Retiro; Attendance: 0 Referee: Wagner do Nascimento Magalhaes |

| 18 October 2020 17 | Internacional | 2–0 | Vasco | Porto Alegre |
| 18:15 UTC−3 | Edenilson 24'; Thiago Galhardo 38' | Report | | Stadium: Estádio Beira-Rio; Attendance: 0 Referee: Braulio da Silva Machado |

| 25 October 2020 18 | Internacional | 2–2 | Flamengo | Porto Alegre |
| 18:15 UTC−3 | Edenilson 24'; Thiago Galhardo 38' | Report | Pedro 10'; Everton Ribeiro 94' | Stadium: Estádio Beira-Rio; Attendance: 0 Referee: Wilton Pereira Sampaio |

| 31 October 2020 19 | Corinthians | 1–0 | Internacional | São Paulo |
| 19:00 UTC−3 | | Report | | Stadium: Neo Química Arena; Attendance: 0 |

| 8 November 2020 20 | Internacional | 2–2 | Coritiba | Porto Alegre |
| 19:00 UTC−3 | | | | Stadium: Estádio Beira-Rio; Attendance: 0 |

| 14 November 2020 21 | Santos | 2–0 | Internacional | Santos |
| 16:30 UTC−3 | | | | Stadium: Vila Belmiro; Attendance: 0 |

| 22 November 2020 22 | Internacional | 1–2 | Fluminense | Porto Alegre |
| 18:15 UTC−3 | | | | Stadium: Beira-Rio; Attendance: 0 |

| 28 November 2020 23 | Atletico Goianiense | 0–0 | Internacional | Goiânia |
| 21:00 UTC−3 | | | | Stadium: Antônio Accioly; Attendance: 0 |

| 6 December 2020 24 | Atlético Mineiro | 0–0 | Internacional | Minas Gerais |
| 18:15 UTC−3 | | | | Stadium: Mineirão; Attendance: 0 |

| 12 December 2020 25 | Internacional | 2–1 | Botafogo | Porto Alegre |
| 19:00 UTC−3 | | | | Stadium: Beira-Rio; Attendance: 0 |

| 19 December 2020 26 | Internacional | 2–0 | Palmeiras | Porto Alegre |
| 21:00 UTC−3 | | | | Stadium: Beira-Rio; Attendance: 0 |

| 27 December 2020 27 | Bahia | 1–2 | Internacional | Bahia |
| 16:00 UTC−3 | | | | Stadium: Arena Fonte Nova; Attendance: 0 |

| 7 January 2021 28 | Ceará | 0–2 | Internacional | Fortaleza |
| 19:00 UTC−3 | | | | Stadium: Castelão; Attendance: 0 |

| 10 January 2021 29 | Internacional | 1–0 | Goiás | Porto Alegre |
| 18:15 UTC−3 | | | | Stadium: Beira-Rio; Attendance: 0 |

| 17 January 2021 30 | Internacional | 4–2 | Fortaleza | Porto Alegre |
| 20:30 UTC−3 | | | | Stadium: Beira-Rio; Attendance: 0 |

| 20 January 2021 31 | São Paulo | 1–5 | Internacional | São Paulo |
| 21:30 UTC−3 | | | | Stadium: Morumbi; Attendance: 0 |

| 24 January 2021 32 | Internacional | 2–1 | Grêmio | Porto Alegre |
| 16:00 UTC−3 | | | | Stadium: Beira-Rio; Attendance: 0 |

| 31 January 2021 33 | Internacional | 2–1 | Red Bull Bragantino | Porto Alegre |
| 18:15 UTC−3 | | | | Stadium: Beira-Rio; Attendance: 0 |

| 4 February 2021 34 | Athletico Paranaense | 0–0 | Internacional | Curitiba |
| 21:00 UTC−3 | | | | Stadium: Arena da Baixada; Attendance: 0 |

| 10 February 2021 35 | Internacional | 1–2 | Sport Recife | Porto Alegre |
| 19:00 UTC−3 | | | | Stadium: Beira-Rio; Attendance: 0 |

| 14 February 2021 36 | Vasco | 0–2 | Internacional | Rio de Janeiro |
| 18:15 UTC−3 | | | | Stadium: São Januário; Attendance: 0 |

| 21 February 2021 37 | Flamengo | 2–1 | Internacional | Rio de Janeiro |
| 16:30 UTC−3 | Arrascaeta 29'; Barbosa 63' | Report | Edenílson 12' (pen.) | Stadium: Maracanã; Attendance: 0 Referee: Raphael Claus |

| 25 February 2021 38 | Internacional | 0–0 | Corinthians | Porto Alegre |
| 21:30 UTC−3 | | Report | | Stadium: Beira-Rio; Attendance: 0 Referee: Wilton Sampaio |

=== Round of 16 ===
| 28 October 2020 First leg | Atlético Goianiense | 1–2 | Internacional | Goiânia |
| 19:00 | Leandro Fernández 12'; Moisés 60' | Report | Jean 90+1' | Stadium: Antônio Accioly; Attendance: 0 Referee: Marcelo de Lima Henrique |

| 3 November 2020 Second leg | Internacional | 2–1 (4–2 agg.) | Atlético Goianiense | Porto Alegre |
| 21:30 | | | | Stadium: Beira-Rio; Attendance: 0 |

=== Quarterfinals ===
| 11 November 2020 First leg | Internacional | 0–1 | América–MG | Porto Alegre |
| 21:30 | | | | Stadium: Beira-Rio; Attendance: 0 |

| 18 November 2020 Second leg | América–MG | 0–1 (1–1 agg.) (6–5 p) | Internacional | Belo Horizonte |
| 21:30 | | | | Stadium: Estádio Independência; Attendance: 0 |

=== Second stage ===
| 4 February 2020 First leg | Universidad de Chile | 0–0 | (Brazil) Internacional | Santiago, Chile |
| 19:15 UTC−3 | | Report | | Stadium: Estadio Nacional Julio Martínez Prádanos; Referee: Facundo Tello (Argentina) |

| 11 February 2020 Second leg | Internacional (Brazil) | 2–0 (2–0 agg.) | Universidad de Chile | Porto Alegre, Brazil |
| 19:15 UTC−3 | Boschilia 43'; Marcos Guilherme 76' | Report | | Stadium: Estádio Beira-Rio; Referee: Esteban Ostojich (Uruguay) |

=== Third stage ===
| 19 February 2020 First leg | Deportes Tolima (Colombia) | 0–0 | (Brazil) Internacional | Ibagué, Colombia |
| 21:30 UTC−5 | | Report | | Stadium: Estadio Manuel Murillo Toro; Referee: Roberto Tobar (Chile) |

| 26 February 2020 Second leg | Internacional (Brazil) | 1–0 (1–0 agg.) | (Colombia) Deportes Tolima | Porto Alegre, Brazil |
| 21:30 UTC−3 | Guerrero 45+4' | Report | | Stadium: Estádio Beira-Rio; Referee: Guillermo Guerrero (Ecuador) |

==== Group stage ====
| Pos | Team | Pld | W | D | L | GF | GA | GD | Pts | Qualification | GRE | INT | UCA | AME |
|---|---|---|---|---|---|---|---|---|---|---|---|---|---|---|
| 1 | (Brazil) Grêmio | 6 | 3 | 2 | 1 | 6 | 3 | +3 | 11 | Round of 16 | — | 0–0 | 2–0 | 1–1 |
| 2 | (Brazil) Internacional | 6 | 2 | 2 | 2 | 8 | 6 | +2 | 8 | Round of 16 | 0–1 | — | 3–0 | 4–3 |
| 3 | (Chile) Universidad Católica | 6 | 2 | 1 | 3 | 5 | 8 | −3 | 7 | Copa Sudamericana | 2–0 | 2–1 | — | 1–2 |
| 4 | (Colombia) América de Cali | 6 | 1 | 3 | 2 | 6 | 8 | −2 | 6 | | 0–2 | 0–0 | 1–1 | — |

Source: CONMEBOL
Rules for classification: 1) Points; 2) Goal difference; 3) Goals scored; 4) Away goals scored; 5) CONMEBOL ranking.

| 3 March 2020 1 | Internacional (Brazil) | 3–0 | (Chile) Universidad Católica | Porto Alegre, Brazil |
| 19:15 UTC−3 | Guerrero 62', 67'; Marcos Guilherme 71' | Report | | Stadium: Estádio Beira-Rio; Referee: Ángel Arteaga (Venezuela) |

| 12 March 2020 2 | Grêmio (Brazil) | 0–0 | (Brazil) Internacional | Porto Alegre, Brazil |
| 21:00 UTC−3 | | Report | | Stadium: Arena do Grêmio; Referee: Fernando Rapallini (Argentina) |

| 16 September 2020 3 | Internacional (Brazil) | 4–3 | (Colombia) América de Cali | Porto Alegre, Brazil |
| 19:15 UTC−3 | Hernández 1', 32'; Boschilia 19', 90' | | Vergara 28'; Ramos 49'; Moreno 78' | Stadium: Beira-Rio; Attendance: 0 |

| 23 September 2020 4 | Internacional (Brazil) | 0–1 | (Brazil) Grêmio | Porto Alegre, Brazil |
| 21:30 UTC−3 | | | Pepê 74' | Stadium: Beira-Rio; Attendance: 0 |

| 29 September 2020 5 | América de Cali (Colombia) | 0–0 | (Brazil) Internacional | Cáli, Colombia |
| 21:30 UTC−3 | | | | Stadium: Estadio Pascual Guerrero; Attendance: 0 |

| 22 October 2020 6 | Universidad Católica (Chile) | 2–1 | (Brazil) Internacional | Santiago, Chile |
| 21:30 UTC−3 | Zampedri 25', 89' | | D'Alessandro 24' | Stadium: Estadio San Carlos de Apoquindo; Attendance: 0 |

==== Round of 16 ====
| 2 December 2020 First leg | Internacional (Brazil) | 0–1 | (Argentina) Boca Juniors | Porto Alegre, Brazil |
| 21:30 UTC−3 | | | | Stadium: Beira-Rio; Attendance: 0 |

| 9 December 2020 Second leg | Boca Juniors (Argentina) | 0–1 (1–1 agg.) (5–4 p) | (Brazil) Internacional | Buenos Aires, Argentina |
| 21:30 UTC−3 | | | | Stadium: La Bomboneira; Attendance: 0 |

== Statistics ==
=== Appearances and goals ===
| No. | Pos | Nat | Player | Total | | Série A | | Copa do Brasil | | Gaúcho | | Libertadores | |
| No. | Pos | Nat | Player | Apps | Goals | Apps | Goals | Apps | Goals | Apps | Goals | Apps | Goals |
Goalkeepers
| 1 | GK | (Brazil) BRA | Danilo Fernandes | 0 | 0 | 0 | 0 | 0 | 0 | 0 | 0 | 0 | 0 |
| 12 | GK | (Brazil) BRA | Marcelo Lomba | 18 | 0 | 6 | 0 | 0 | 0 | 7 | 0 | 5 | 0 |
| 32 | GK | (Brazil) BRA | Keiller | 0 | 0 | 0 | 0 | 0 | 0 | 0 | 0 | 0 | 0 |
| 42 | GK | (Brazil) BRA | Daniel | 0 | 0 | 0 | 0 | 0 | 0 | 0 | 0 | 0 | 0 |
Defenders
| 2 | DF | (Brazil) BRA | Heitor | 4 | 1 | 0 | 0 | 0 | 0 | 4 | 1 | 0 | 0 |
| 4 | DF | (Brazil) BRA | Rodrigo Moledo | 8 | 1 | 0+2 | 0 | 0 | 0 | 3 | 1 | 2+1 | 0 |
| 6 | DF | (Brazil) BRA | Uendel | 5 | 0 | 0 | 0 | 0 | 0 | 3 | 0 | 2 | 0 |
| 15 | DF | (Argentina) ARG | Víctor Cuesta | 15 | 0 | 6 | 0 | 0 | 0 | 3+1 | 0 | 5 | 0 |
| 20 | DF | (Brazil) BRA | Moisés | 12 | 0 | 5+1 | 0 | 0 | 0 | 3 | 0 | 3 | 0 |
| 22 | DF | (Brazil) BRA | Rodinei | 9 | 0 | 1 | 0 | 0 | 0 | 3 | 0 | 5 | 0 |
| 25 | DF | (Brazil) BRA | Matheus Jussa | 1 | 0 | 1 | 0 | 0 | 0 | 0 | 0 | 0 | 0 |
| 26 | DF | (Argentina) ARG | Renzo Saravia | 5 | 0 | 5 | 0 | 0 | 0 | 0 | 0 | 0 | 0 |
| 28 | DF | (Brazil) BRA | Natanael | 1 | 0 | 0 | 0 | 0 | 0 | 1 | 0 | 0 | 0 |
| 34 | DF | (Brazil) BRA | Erik | 0 | 0 | 0 | 0 | 0 | 0 | 0 | 0 | 0 | 0 |
| 39 | DF | (Brazil) BRA | Carlos Eduardo | 1 | 0 | 0 | 0 | 0 | 0 | 0+1 | 0 | 0 | 0 |
| 40 | DF | (Brazil) BRA | Roberto Rosa | 1 | 0 | 0 | 0 | 0 | 0 | 1 | 0 | 0 | 0 |
| 41 | DF | (Brazil) BRA | Pedro Henrique | 3 | 0 | 0 | 0 | 0 | 0 | 3 | 0 | 0 | 0 |
Midfielders
| 5 | MF | (Argentina) ARG | Damián Musto | 14 | 1 | 1+4 | 1 | 0 | 0 | 3+1 | 0 | 5 | 0 |
| 8 | MF | (Brazil) BRA | Edenílson | 14 | 3 | 4+1 | 1 | 0 | 0 | 3+1 | 2 | 5 | 0 |
| 10 | MF | (Argentina) ARG | Andrés D'Alessandro | 11 | 2 | 1+3 | 0 | 0 | 0 | 3 | 2 | 3+1 | 0 |
| 13 | MF | (Brazil) BRA | Rodrigo Dourado | 0 | 0 | 0 | 0 | 0 | 0 | 0 | 0 | 0 | 0 |
| 17 | MF | (Brazil) BRA | Thiago Galhardo | 15 | 7 | 4+2 | 4 | 0 | 0 | 5+2 | 3 | 1+1 | 0 |
| 19 | MF | (Brazil) BRA | Rodrigo Lindoso | 16 | 0 | 5+1 | 0 | 0 | 0 | 4+1 | 0 | 4+1 | 0 |
| 21 | MF | (Brazil) BRA | Gabriel Boschilia | 13 | 2 | 4+1 | 1 | 0 | 0 | 3 | 0 | 3+2 | 1 |
| 23 | MF | (Brazil) BRA | Marcos Guilherme | 18 | 3 | 3+3 | 0 | 0 | 0 | 4+3 | 1 | 2+3 | 2 |
| 29 | MF | (Argentina) ARG | Martín Sarrafiore | 4 | 0 | 0 | 0 | 0 | 0 | 3+1 | 0 | 0 | 0 |
| 30 | MF | (United States) USA | Johnny | 6 | 0 | 0 | 0 | 0 | 0 | 4 | 0 | 0+2 | 0 |
| 31 | MF | (Brazil) BRA | João Peglow | 3 | 0 | 1+2 | 0 | 0 | 0 | 0 | 0 | 0 | 0 |
| 33 | MF | (Brazil) BRA | Nonato | 4 | 0 | 0 | 0 | 0 | 0 | 4 | 0 | 0 | 0 |
| 35 | MF | (Brazil) BRA | Zé Gabriel | 9 | 0 | 4+1 | 0 | 0 | 0 | 3+1 | 0 | 0 | 0 |
| 38 | MF | (Brazil) BRA | José Aldo | 0 | 0 | 0 | 0 | 0 | 0 | 0 | 0 | 0 | 0 |
| 45 | MF | (Brazil) BRA | Praxedes | 5 | 0 | 2 | 0 | 0 | 0 | 0+2 | 0 | 0+1 | 0 |
| 88 | MF | (Brazil) BRA | Patrick | 11 | 0 | 6 | 0 | 0 | 0 | 3 | 0 | 2 | 0 |
Forwards
| 7 | FW | (Brazil) BRA | William Pottker | 4 | 0 | 2+1 | 0 | 0 | 0 | 0+1 | 0 | 0 | 0 |
| 9 | FW | (Peru) PER | Paolo Guerrero | 10 | 7 | 3 | 3 | 0 | 0 | 2 | 1 | 5 | 3 |
| 11 | FW | (Brazil) BRA | Yuri Alberto | 1 | 0 | 0+1 | 0 | 0 | 0 | 0 | 0 | 0 | 0 |
| 36 | FW | (Brazil) BRA | Netto | 2 | 0 | 0 | 0 | 0 | 0 | 0+2 | 0 | 0 | 0 |
| | FW | (Brazil) BRA | Guilherme Pato | 2 | 0 | 0 | 0 | 0 | 0 | 0+2 | 0 | 0 | 0 |
| | FW | (Brazil) BRA | Gustavo | 2 | 0 | 0 | 0 | 0 | 0 | 1 | 0 | 0+1 | 0 |
Players transferred out during the season
| 3 | DF | (Brazil) BRA | Bruno Fuchs | 6 | 0 | 2 | 0 | 0 | 0 | 1 | 0 | 3 | 0 |
| 11 | FW | (Brazil) BRA | Wellington Silva | 1 | 0 | 0 | 0 | 0 | 0 | 1 | 0 | 0 | 0 |

Last updated: 29 August 2020
Source: Competitions

=== Goalscorers ===
| Rank | No. | Pos | Nat | Name | Série A | Copa do Brasil | Gaúcho | Libertadores | Total |
|---|---|---|---|---|---|---|---|---|---|
| 1 | 9 | FW | (Peru) | Paolo Guerrero | 3 | 0 | 4 | 3 | 10 |
| 1 | 17 | MF | (Brazil) | Thiago Galhardo | 5 | 0 | 5 | 0 | 10 |
| 3 | 21 | MF | (Brazil) | Marcos Guilherme | 0 | 0 | 2 | 2 | 4 |
| 3 | 8 | MF | (Brazil) | Edenílson | 1 | 0 | 3 | 0 | 4 |
| 5 | 88 | MF | (Brazil) | Patrick | 0 | 0 | 2 | 0 | 2 |
| 5 | | FW | (Brazil) | Nonato | 0 | 0 | 2 | 0 | 2 |
| 5 | 21 | MF | (Brazil) | Gabriel Boschilia | 0 | 0 | 1 | 1 | 2 |
| 5 | 10 | MF | (Argentina) | Andrés D'Alessandro | 0 | 0 | 2 | 0 | 2 |
| 9 | 7 | FW | (Brazil) | William Pottker | 0 | 0 | 1 | 0 | 1 |
| 9 | 5 | MF | (Argentina) | Damián Musto | 1 | 0 | 0 | 0 | 1 |
| 9 | 4 | DF | (Brazil) | Rodrigo Moledo | 0 | 0 | 1 | 0 | 1 |
| 9 | 2 | DF | (Brazil) | Heitor | 0 | 0 | 1 | 0 | 1 |
| Totals | | | | | 7 | 0 | 24 | 6 | 37 |

=== Disciplinary record ===
| No. | Pos | Nat | Name | Série A | | | Copa do Brasil | | | Copa Libertadores | | | Gaúcho | | | Total | | |
| No. | Pos | Nat | Name | Booked | (yellow card) (yellow-red card) | Sent off (straight red) | Booked | (yellow card) (yellow-red card) | Sent off (straight red) | Booked | (yellow card) (yellow-red card) | Sent off (straight red) | Booked | (yellow card) (yellow-red card) | Sent off (straight red) | Booked | (yellow card) (yellow-red card) | Sent off (straight red) |
| 12 | GK | (Brazil) | Marcelo Lomba | 1 | 0 | 0 | 0 | 0 | 0 | 0 | 0 | 0 | 2 | 0 | 0 | 3 | 0 | 0 |
| 2 | DF | (Brazil) | Heitor | 0 | 0 | 0 | 0 | 0 | 0 | 0 | 0 | 0 | 1 | 0 | 0 | 1 | 0 | 0 |
| 3 | DF | (Brazil) | Bruno Fuchs | 1 | 0 | 0 | 0 | 0 | 0 | 1 | 0 | 0 | 0 | 0 | 0 | 2 | 0 | 0 |
| 6 | DF | (Brazil) | Uendel | 0 | 0 | 0 | 0 | 0 | 0 | 1 | 0 | 0 | 0 | 0 | 0 | 1 | 0 | 0 |
| 15 | DF | (Argentina) | Víctor Cuesta | 1 | 0 | 0 | 0 | 0 | 0 | 2 | 0 | 1 | 3 | 0 | 0 | 6 | 0 | 1 |
| 20 | DF | (Brazil) | Moisés | 1 | 0 | 0 | 0 | 0 | 0 | 0 | 0 | 1 | 2 | 0 | 0 | 3 | 0 | 1 |
| 22 | DF | (Brazil) | Rodinei | 0 | 0 | 0 | 0 | 0 | 0 | 2 | 0 | 0 | 0 | 0 | 0 | 2 | 0 | 0 |
| 25 | DF | (Brazil) | Matheus Jussa | 1 | 0 | 0 | 0 | 0 | 0 | 0 | 0 | 0 | 0 | 0 | 0 | 1 | 0 | 0 |
| 26 | DF | (Argentina) | Renzo Saravia | 1 | 0 | 0 | 0 | 0 | 0 | 0 | 0 | 0 | 0 | 0 | 1 | 1 | 0 | 1 |
| 28 | DF | (Brazil) | Natanael | 0 | 0 | 0 | 0 | 0 | 0 | 0 | 0 | 0 | 2 | 0 | 0 | 2 | 0 | 0 |
| 40 | DF | (Brazil) | Roberto Rosa | 0 | 0 | 0 | 0 | 0 | 0 | 0 | 0 | 0 | 2 | 0 | 0 | 2 | 0 | 0 |
| 41 | DF | (Brazil) | Pedro Henrique | 0 | 0 | 0 | 0 | 0 | 0 | 0 | 0 | 0 | 1 | 0 | 0 | 1 | 0 | 0 |
| 5 | MF | (Argentina) | Damián Musto | 1 | 0 | 0 | 0 | 0 | 0 | 3 | 0 | 0 | 5 | 1 | 0 | 9 | 1 | 0 |
| 8 | MF | (Brazil) | Edenílson | 2 | 0 | 0 | 0 | 0 | 0 | 0 | 0 | 1 | 1 | 0 | 0 | 2 | 0 | 1 |
| 10 | MF | (Argentina) | Andres D'Alessandro | 1 | 0 | 0 | 0 | 0 | 0 | 1 | 1 | 0 | 0 | 0 | 0 | 1 | 1 | 0 |
| 17 | MF | (Brazil) | Thiago Galhardo | 0 | 0 | 0 | 0 | 0 | 0 | 1 | 0 | 0 | 1 | 0 | 0 | 2 | 0 | 0 |
| 19 | MF | (Brazil) | Rodrigo Lindoso | 0 | 0 | 0 | 0 | 0 | 0 | 1 | 0 | 0 | 3 | 0 | 0 | 4 | 0 | 0 |
| 21 | MF | (Brazil) | Gabriel Boschilia | 1 | 0 | 0 | 0 | 0 | 0 | 1 | 0 | 0 | 2 | 0 | 0 | 3 | 0 | 0 |
| 23 | MF | (Brazil) | Marcos Guilherme | 1 | 0 | 0 | 0 | 0 | 0 | 3 | 0 | 0 | 3 | 0 | 0 | 7 | 0 | 0 |
| 29 | MF | (Argentina) | Martín Sarrafiore | 0 | 0 | 0 | 0 | 0 | 0 | 0 | 0 | 0 | 2 | 0 | 0 | 2 | 0 | 0 |
| 35 | MF | (Brazil) | Zé Gabriel | 0 | 0 | 0 | 0 | 0 | 0 | 0 | 0 | 0 | 1 | 1 | 0 | 1 | 1 | 0 |
| 45 | MF | (Brazil) | Bruno Praxedes | 1 | 0 | 0 | 0 | 0 | 0 | 0 | 0 | 1 | 2 | 0 | 0 | 3 | 0 | 1 |
| 88 | MF | (Brazil) | Patrick | 0 | 0 | 0 | 0 | 0 | 0 | 0 | 0 | 0 | 2 | 0 | 1 | 2 | 0 | 1 |
| 7 | FW | (Brazil) | William Pottker | 0 | 0 | 1 | 0 | 0 | 0 | 0 | 0 | 0 | 0 | 0 | 0 | 0 | 0 | 1 |
| 9 | FW | (Peru) | Paolo Guerrero | 0 | 0 | 0 | 0 | 0 | 0 | 1 | 0 | 0 | 2 | 0 | 0 | 3 | 0 | 0 |
| 43 | FW | (Brazil) | Guilherme Pato | 0 | 0 | 0 | 0 | 0 | 0 | 0 | 0 | 0 | 2 | 0 | 0 | 2 | 0 | 0 |
| Totals | | | | 13 | 0 | 1 | 0 | 0 | 0 | 17 | 1 | 4 | 39 | 2 | 2 | 69 | 3 | 7 |

Last updated: 30 August 2020
