= Thiago Galhardo =

Brazilian footballer

Personal information
- Full name: Thiago Galhardo Nascimento Rocha
- Date of birth: 20 July 1989 (age 37)
- Place of birth: São João del-Rei, Brazil
- Height: 1.82 m (6 ft 0 in)
- Position: Attacking midfielder

Team information
- Current team: Feira FC
- Number: 9

Youth career
- 2008–2009: Bangu

Senior career*
Years	Team	Apps	(Gls)
2010–2013	Bangu	37	(7)
2011	→ Botafogo (loan)	11	(0)
2012	→ Comercial-SP (loan)	1	(0)
2012	→ América de Natal (loan)	16	(1)
2013	→ Remo (loan)	17	(9)
2014	Boa Esporte	1	(0)
2014	Cametá	9	(4)
2014	Brasiliense	3	(0)
2015	Madureira	14	(5)
2015–2017	Coritiba	25	(1)
2016	→ Red Bull Brasil (loan)	13	(3)
2016	→ Ponte Preta (loan)	21	(0)
2017	→ Albirex Niigata (loan)	23	(3)
2018–2019	Vasco da Gama	42	(6)
2019	Ceará	34	(12)
2020–2022	Internacional	82	(34)
2021–2022	→ Celta de Vigo (loan)	34	(2)
2022	→ Fortaleza (loan)	21	(7)
2023–2024	Fortaleza	79	(20)
2024	→ Goiás (loan)	27	(6)
2025–2026	Santa Cruz	10	(5)
2026–	Feira FC	0	(0)
- * Club domestic league appearances and goals as of 24 July 2022

Thiago Galhardo Nascimento Rocha (born 20 July 1989), known as Thiago Galhardo, is a Brazilian professional footballer who plays as an attacking midfielder for Feira FC.

== Club career ==
Born in São João del Rei, Minas Gerais, Galhardo joined Bangu's youth setup in 2008 after turning down a job offer in Petrobras. He made his debut as a senior on 20 January 2010, coming on as a second-half substitute in a 3–0 Campeonato Carioca away loss against Fluminense.

Galhardo scored his first senior goal on 27 February 2010, netting the second in a 3–0 win at Resende. He finished the tournament with 15 appearances, as his side achieved a mid-table position.

After impressing in 2011 Campeonato Carioca, Galhardo joined Brasileirão Série A club Botafogo on 14 April 2011, on loan until December. He made his debut in the category on 22 May, starting in a 1–0 away loss against Palmeiras.

On 19 January 2012, Galhardo was loaned to Comercial de Ribeirão Preto until May. Rarely used by the club, he returned to Bangu and served subsequent loans at América de Natal and Remo.

After having unpaid wages, Galhardo left Remo in June 2013 and returned to Bangu. The following year he represented Boa, Cametá and Brasiliense, appearing sparingly in all of them.

On 3 January 2015, Galhardo agreed to a deal at Madureira, and scored five goals and amassed seven assists in 14 matches during the year's Carioca. On 23 April he returned the top tier, signing a three-year deal with Coritiba.

Galhardo scored his first goal in the main category on 16 May 2015, netting the first in a 2–0 home win against Grêmio. He contributed with 25 appearances, as his side narrowly avoided relegation.

On 20 January 2016, Galhardo was loaned to Red Bull Brasil until the end of the 2016 Campeonato Paulista.

On 6 January 2017, Galhardo was loaned to Albirex Niigata until the end of the 2017 season. In April 2019, he returned to his home country and joined Ceará.

On 8 January 2020, after scoring 12 goals for Vozão, Galhardo signed a one-year contract with Internacional. He immediately became a regular starter, scoring a career-best 23 goals during the campaign as his club finished second in the league.

On 25 August 2021, Galhardo joined La Liga side RC Celta de Vigo on loan, reuniting with former Internacional manager Eduardo Coudet.

== Personal life ==
Galhardo's younger brother, Gabriel, is also a footballer and a midfielder. Both were groomed at Bangu, and played together in 2012.

== Career statistics ==
As of 29 November 2021

Appearances and goals by club, season and competition
Club	Season	League			State League		Cup		Continental		Other		Total	
Club	Season	Division	Apps	Goals	Apps	Goals	Apps	Goals	Apps	Goals	Apps	Goals	Apps	Goals
Bangu	2010	Carioca	—		15	1	—		—		11 (Note: Appearance(s) in Copa Rio)	1	26	2
Bangu	2011	Carioca	—		13	3	3	2	—		—		16	5
Bangu	2012	Carioca	—		9	3	—		—		—		9	3
Bangu	2013	Carioca	—		—		—		—		13	3	13	3
Bangu	Total		—		37	7	—		—		24	4	61	11
Botafogo (loan)	2011	Série A	11	0	—		—		—		—		11	0
Comercial-SP (loan)	2012	Paulista	—		1	0	—		—		—		1	0
América-RN (loan)	2012	Série B	16	1	—		—		—		—		16	1
Remo (loan)	2013	Paraense	—		17	9	1	0	—		—		18	9
Boa Esporte	2014	Série B	0	0	1	0	—		—		—		1	0
Cametá	2014	Paraense	—		9	4	—		—		—		9	4
Brasiliense	2014	Série D	3	0	—		—		—		—		3	0
Madureira	2015	Carioca	—		14	5	—		—		—		14	5
Coritiba	2015	Série A	25	1	—		4	0	—		—		29	1
Red Bull Brasil (loan)	2016	Paulista	—		13	3	—		—		—		13	3
Ponte Preta (loan)	2016	Série A	21	0	—		3	2	—		—		24	2
Albirex Niigata (loan)	2017	J1 League	23	3	—		0	0	—		1 (Note: Appearance(s) in J.League Cup)	0	24	3
Vasco da Gama	2018	Série A	22	3	8	2	1	0	7 (Note: Five appearances in Copa Libertadores, two appearances and two goals in Copa Sudamericana)	2	—		38	7
Vasco da Gama	2019	Série A	0	0	12	1	2	1	—		—		14	2
Vasco da Gama	Total		22	3	20	3	3	1	7	2	—		52	9
Ceará	2019	Série A	34	12	—		—		—		—		34	12
Internacional	2020	Série A	29	17	13	5	3	1	9 (Note: Appearance(s) in Copa Libertadores)	0	—		54	23
Internacional	2021	Série A	9	1	10	5	2	1	7	4	—		28	11
Internacional	Total		38	18	23	10	5	2	16	4	—		82	34
Celta (loan)	2021–22	La Liga	28	2	—		—		—		—		12	0
Career total			205	38	109	28	19	7	23	6	25	4	381	83

== Honours ==
=== Club ===
Madureira

- Taça Rio: 2015

Vasco da Gama

- Taça Guanabara: 2019

Fortaleza

- Campeonato Cearense: 2023
- Copa do Nordeste: 2024

=== Individual ===
- Campeonato Gaúcho Team of the Year: 2020
- Campeonato Brasileiro Série A Player of the Month: August 2020
- Best Forward in Brazil: 2020
