= Roberto Pérez (disambiguation) =

Roberto Pérez (born 1988) is a Puerto Rican professional baseball catcher.

Roberto Pérez may also refer to:

- Roberto Guerra Perez (born 1978), Cuban journalist and blogger
- Roberto Iglesias Pérez (1930–2006), Puerto Rican politician
- Roberto Mena Pérez (born 1984), Spanish wheelchair basketball player
- Roberto Pérez (Mexican footballer) (born 1968), Mexican football manager and former goalkeeper
- Robert Pérez (baseball) (born 1969), Venezuelan baseball outfielder
- Roberto Pérez (Bolivian footballer) (1960–2024), Bolivian football player
- Roberto Pérez (Paraguayan footballer) (born 1981), Paraguayan football manager and former player
- Roberto Pérez de Alva (born 1953), Mexican politician
- Rubby Pérez (Roberto Antonio Pérez Herrera, born 1956), Dominican merengue singer
