= Roberton =

Roberton may refer to:

== Places ==
- Roberton, Scottish Borders, Scotland
- Roberton, South Lanarkshire, Scotland

== People ==
- Cora Roberton (1881–1962), New Zealand nurse
- Dylan Roberton (born 1991), AFL player
- Dr Ernest Roberton, one of the founders of the Diocesan school for girls, Auckland
- Elizabeth Roberton, a European settler on Motuarohia Island whose murder was the subject of the trial of Wiremu Kingi Maketu
- Hugh S. Roberton (composer) (1874–1952), Scottish composer and founder of the Glasgow Orpheus Choir
- Hugh Roberton (politician) (1900–1987), Hugh's son, Australian MP and foundation member for the National Party of Australia
- James Roberton, Lord Bedlay (c.1590–1664), Scottish advocate and judge
- Sir James Roberton (1821–1889), Scottish lawyer
- James Basil Wilkie Roberton (1896–1996), New Zealand soldier, doctor and genealogist
- John Roberton (1776) (1776–1840), Physician and social reformer
- John Roberton (1797) (1797–1876), Obstetrician and social reformer
- Sandy Roberton (1942–2022), British record producer, artist manager, and music industry executive
- Steve Roberton (born c.1968), senior commander of the Royal Australian Air Force
- Thomas Beattie Roberton (1879–1936), Scottish-born Canadian journalist
- Violet Mary Craig Roberton (1888–1954), Scottish politician

== See also ==
- Mitchells Roberton
- Robertson (disambiguation)
