= Zé Roberto (disambiguation) =

Zé Roberto (born 1974), full name José Roberto da Silva Júnior, is a Brazilian football left-back and midfielder.

Zé Roberto is also a Portuguese nickname for people named José Roberto, and may refer to:

- Zé Roberto (footballer, born 1945), full name José Roberto Marques, Brazilian football forward
- Zé Roberto (volleyball) (born 1954), full name José Roberto Guimarães, Brazilian volleyball coach and former player
- Zé Roberto (footballer, born 1978), full name José Roberto Gomes Santana, Brazilian football midfielder
- Zé Roberto (footballer, born 1980), full name José Roberto de Oliveira, Brazilian football attacking midfielder
- Zé Roberto (footballer, born 1993), full name José Roberto Assunção de Araújo Filho, Brazilian football forward

== See also ==
- Roberto (disambiguation)
