= McClure Naismith =

McClure Naismith LLP
- Company type: Limited liability partnership
- Industry: Commercial law
- Founded: Glasgow, 1826
- Founder: James Drew
- Headquarters: St. Vincent Street, Glasgow
- Area served: Scotland and UK
- Services: Legal advice
- Revenue: £13.1m (2011)
- Website: www.mcclurenaismith.com

McClure Naismith LLP was a firm of Scottish commercial solicitors, headquartered in Glasgow and with further offices in Edinburgh and London. Founded in 1826 it was one of the older firms in Scotland, and was generally considered a mid-tier firm. Its 2010 turnover of £13.9m (which dropped to £13.1m in 2011) placed it at 133 in The Lawyer magazine's list of the largest UK firms.

== Practice ==
The firm's practice areas included Banking & Asset Finance, Consumer Finance Debt Recovery, Construction, Corporate, Dispute Resolution (encompassing Litigation, Family and Employment), Private Client, Projects, and Real Estate.

It was rated by legal directory Legal500 as a first tier firm in Debt Recovery and as a second tier firm in Projects and Intellectual Property. In the Chambers and Partners directory, Consumer Finance partner Frank Johnstone was rated as Band 1, while the firm was rated Band 2 for Partnership, Personal Injury (Defendant) and Real Estate Litigation.

== Locations ==
The firm had its head office on St. Vincent Street in Glasgow, with additional offices in the central Fountainbridge business district of Edinburgh and on King William Street in London, by London Bridge.

== History ==
The firm was founded in October 1826 by James Drew, a sole practitioner practising from his father's home at Auldhouse, Pollokshaws. His practice was mainly in debt recovery, with a small amount of conveyancing. He moved the following year to an office in Hutcheson Street in the City Centre, named after the Hutchesons' Hospital which stood at its head, and thereafter to various other premises in the city. On 1 April 1843, whilst based in Buchanan Street, he assumed John McClure as a partner for a term of fifteen years, forming the partnership of Drew & McClure. At the end of the fifteen years, on 31 March 1858, Drew retired, and the following day McClure went into partnership with John Naismith, again for a term of fifteen years, forming McClure & Naismith.

On 15 September the year after, 1859, McClure & Naismith assumed Robert Brodie as a partner for the remaining period of their partnership agreement i.e. until 31 March 1873, changing the firm name to McClure, Naismith & Brodie. The following year, Brodie took up the position of Clerk to the Company of Stationers of Glasgow. In 1862, the firm moved to 81 St. Vincent Street, and, although not at the same number, remained in that street until its demise. Duncan Macfarlane was added to the partnership on 1 April 1869, shortly before the expiry of the McClure & Naismith partnership agreement, although the name was not changed at this time. Drew died in London on 24 March 1879.

When the McClure & Naismith partnership agreement expired on 31 March 1873, McClure retired, and the remaining partners, Naismith, Brodie and Macfarlane, agreed to continue in partnership for a further ten years, adding Macfarlane's name to the title whilst retaining McClure's. Various other partners came and went, and on 1 April 1881, the firm's name was again changed, to McClure, Naismith, Brodie & Co., which name it would retain for the next hundred years. McClure died in Glasgow on 17 March 1886, Macfarlane at Innellan on 8 August 1880, Naismith at Glasgow on 17 November 1885, and Brodie in Glasgow on 25 April 1909.

Subsequent partners in the firm included William Brodie, son of Robert Brodie, assumed in 1889; John Girvan, Professor of Conveyancing in the University of Glasgow from 1927 to 1946, assumed in 1914; James Sutherland, President of the Law Society from 1972 to 1975, assumed in 1951; James Inglis, Professor of Conveyancing in the University of Glasgow from 1979 to 1993, assumed in 1956; and Aline Patterson, the first female partner, assumed in 1969. In 1983, McClure, Naismith, Brodie & Co. merged with Anderson & Gardiner, forming McClure Naismith Anderson & Gardiner, which was later shortened to McClure Naismith. The firm converted to a limited liability partnership in 2008.

The partnership went into administration in August 2015.
