= William Sharp McKechnie =

Scottish scholar

- Born: 2 September 1863; Paisley, Scotland, United Kingdom
- Died: 2 July 1930 (aged 66)
- Education: University of Glasgow
- Notable work: Magna Carta: A Commentary on the Great Charter of King John with an Historical Introduction

William Sharp McKechnie (2 September 1863 – 2 July 1930) was a Scottish scholar, historian, lecturer in Constitutional Law and History, and author of Magna Carta: A Commentary on the Great Charter of King John with an Historical Introduction. He later held the Chair of Conveyancing at the University of Glasgow from 1916 until 1927. Upon his retirement, he was awarded an honorary LL.D.

== Biography ==
Born in Paisley, Scotland to William McKechnie on 2 September 1863, McKechnie studied at the University of Glasgow. He was awarded an MA in philosophy from the University of Glasgow in 1883, having been awarded prizes in logic, moral philosophy and natural philosophy. He completed his LLB in 1887, and a DPhil in 1897, having qualified as a solicitor in 1890. In 1894 he became a lecturer in Constitutional Law and History at Glasgow, and the same year married Elizabeth Cochrane Malloch, daughter of the late John Malloch. He continued to serve as a lecturer until his appointment to the Chair of Conveyancing in 1916. McKechnie died on 2 July 1930.

== Works ==
His essay on Magna Carta, published in 1905 with a re-edition in 1914, first translates and then examines in great detail the individual sections of this constitutional piece of legislation; prior to McKechnie's work, it had not undergone review since 1829. The work was very favourably reviewed by DNB historian HWC Davis, who considered his translations of the original Latin text to be particularly valuable. McKechnie's work, particularly his Magna Carta essay, was identified by Herbert Butterfield as a primary factor in the undermining of Whig history. His thoughts on The State and the Individual were acceptable with reservations to the early Fabian intellectual Sidney Ball. His 1909 work to reform the House of Lords earned a favourable review, and influenced the Parliament Act 1911; Corinne Comstock Weston considered him a highly influential constitutional thinker of the period.
