= Martín Sarrafiore =

Argentine footballer

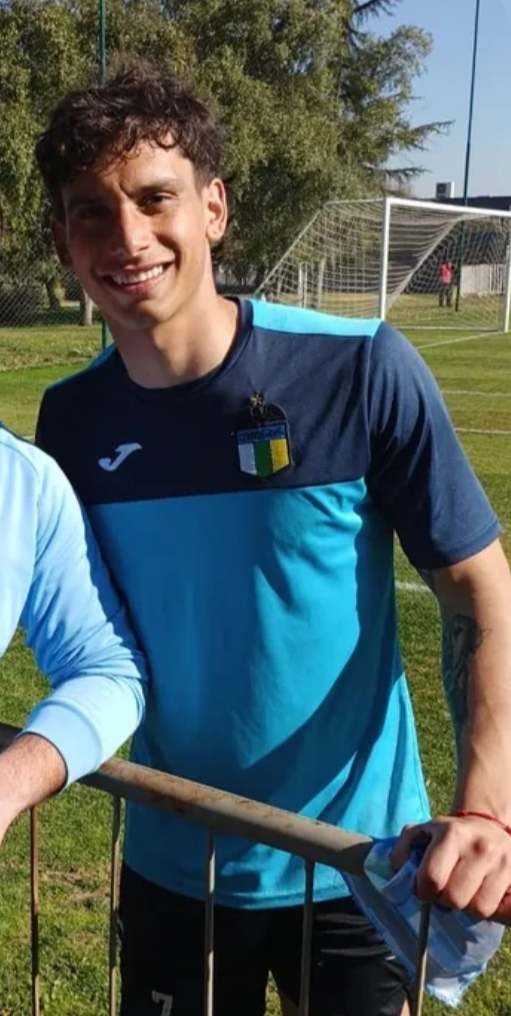
- Sarrafior with O'Higgins in 2024

Personal information
- Full name: Martín Nicolás Sarrafiore
- Date of birth: 20 July 1997 (age 29)
- Place of birth: Villa Ballester, Argentina
- Height: 1.80 m (5 ft 11 in)
- Position: Attacking midfielder

Team information
- Current team: Atlante
- Number: 30

Youth career
- Huracán

Senior career*
| Years | Team | Apps | (Gls) |
| 2016–2017 | Huracán | 0 | (0) |
| 2018–2022 | Internacional | 22 | (3) |
| 2020–2021 | → Coritiba (loan) | 16 | (1) |
| 2021–2022 | → Vasco da Gama (loan) | 15 | (2) |
| 2023 | Independiente | 16 | (0) |
| 2024–2026 | O'Higgins | 58 | (9) |
| 2026– | Atlante | 14 | (3) |
- * Club domestic league appearances and goals as of 20 November 2026

Martín Nicolás Sarrafiore (born 20 July 1997) is an Argentine professional footballer who plays as an attacking midfielder for Liga MX club Atlante.

== Career ==
In 2024, Sarrafiore moved to Chile and joined O'Higgins.

On 3 June 2019, he signed with Internacional on a free transfer.

== Career statistics ==
As of match played on 20 November 2026

Appearances and goals by club, season and competition
| Club | Season | League | | | Cup | | Continental | | State League | | Other | | Total | |
| Club | Season | Division | Apps | Goals | Apps | Goals | Apps | Goals | Apps | Goals | Apps | Goals | Apps | Goals |
|---|---|---|---|---|---|---|---|---|---|---|---|---|---|---|
| Internacional | 2018 | Série A | 1 | 0 | — | | — | | — | | — | | 1 | 0 |
| Internacional | 2019 | Série A | 19 | 3 | 4 (Note: Appearances in Copa do Brasil) | 0 | 2 (Note: Appearances in Copa Libertadores) | 0 | 10 (Note: Appearances in Campeonato Gaúcho) | 3 | — | | 35 | 6 |
| Internacional | 2020 | Série A | 2 | 0 | — | | — | | 6 | 0 | — | | 8 | 0 |
| Internacional | Total | | 22 | 3 | 4 | 0 | 2 | 0 | 16 | 3 | — | | 44 | 6 |
| Coritiba (loan) | 2020 | Série A | 16 | 1 | — | | — | | — | | — | | 16 | 1 |
| Vasco da Gama (loan) | 2021 | Série B | 14 | 2 | 4 | 1 | — | | — | | — | | 18 | 3 |
| Vasco da Gama (loan) | 2022 | Série B | 1 | 0 | — | | — | | — | | — | | 1 | 0 |
| Vasco da Gama (loan) | Total | | 15 | 2 | 4 | 1 | — | | — | | — | | 19 | 3 |
| Independiente | 2023 | Primera División | 16 | 0 | 4 (Note: Two appearances in Copa Argentina and two in Copa de la Liga Profesional) | 0 | — | | — | | — | | 20 | 0 |
| O'Higgins | 2024 | Primera División | 26 | 3 | 2 (Note: Appearances in Copa Chile) | 1 | — | | — | | — | | 28 | 4 |
| O'Higgins | 2025 | Liga de Primera | 19 | 4 | 2 | 0 | — | | — | | — | | 21 | 4 |
| O'Higgins | 2026 | Liga de Primera | 13 | 2 | 8 (Note: Seven appearances in Copa de la Liga and one in Copa Chile) | 0 | 12 (Note: Four appearances in Copa Libertadores and eight and one goal in Copa Sudamericana) | 1 | — | | — | | 33 | 3 |
| O'Higgins | Total | | 58 | 9 | 12 | 1 | 12 | 1 | — | | — | | 82 | 11 |
| Atlante | 2026–27 | Liga MX | 14 | 3 | — | | — | | — | | — | | 14 | 3 |
| Career total | | | 141 | 18 | 24 | 2 | 14 | 1 | 16 | 3 | 0 | 0 | 195 | 24 |

== Personal life ==
Sarrafiore has Mexican roots through his mother's side.
