= Roberta (disambiguation) =

Roberta is a feminine version of the given name Robert.

Roberta may also refer to:

== Entertainment ==
- Roberta (musical), a 1933 Broadway musical
- Roberta (1935 film), an adaptation of the Broadway play starring Fred Astaire, Ginger Rogers, Randolph Scott and Irene Dunne
- Roberta, a 1951 Filipino film starring Tessie Agana
- Roberta (1958 film), a made-for-TV movie adaptation of the Broadway play
- Roberta (1969 film), a color telecast adaptation of the Broadway play
- Roberta, a 1979 Filipino film starring Julie Vega
- Roberta (2014 film), a Canadian short drama film directed by Caroline Monnet
- Roberta (album), by Roberta Flack
- "Roberta," a song performed by Lead Belly
- "Roberta", song by Peppino di Capri
- Roberta, a character from the Donald Duck universe
- Roberta, the official name for the T-rex in Jurassic Park, more commonly known as Rexy

== Places ==
- Roberta, Georgia, United States
- Roberta, Oklahoma, United States
- 335 Roberta, a large asteroid

== Other uses ==
- Roberta's, a Brooklyn, New York, pizzeria
- RoBERTa, a variant of the language model BERT

== See also ==
- Roberto (disambiguation)
