= Society of Advocates in Aberdeen =

- Formation: Prior to 1549
- Type: Professional body
- Purpose: Law Faculty
- Headquarters: Concert Court
- Location: Aberdeen
- Coordinates: 57.148°N 2.095°W
- Region served: Aberdeen and North East Scotland
- President: Anne Boyd
- Main organ: Management Committee
- Website: https://www.socofadvocates.com/

The Society of Advocates in Aberdeen is professional body of legal practitioners based in the city of Aberdeen, Scotland, and its surrounding area.

Prior to a change in rules, and ultimately the establishment of the Law Society of Scotland, the society was responsible for the training, examination, authorisation and regulation of those engaged in legal practice in the North East of Scotland.

The society is now a non-regulatory body which continues to provide facilities and services, such as a library and continuing professional development (CPD) training, along with social events for members. It has a similar role to the other law faculties in Scotland, such as the Society of Writers to His Majesty's Signet (WS Society) in Edinburgh and the Royal Faculty of Procurators in Glasgow.

The society is based in Advocates Hall, located on Concert Court behind Aberdeen Sheriff Court.

== History ==
The exact date of the society's foundation is unknown, as many records were destroyed in a fire at the city's Record Office in 1721. Their earliest written record refers to a member named Alexander Paip, a member admitted in 1549, but the foundation of the University of Aberdeen by Bishop Elphinstone as a School of Law in 1495 suggests there was a local legal community before then. Outside of the society's own records the earliest known reference was in a pardon signed by James VI and I in 1588 which refers to Patrick Cheyne an "Advocate in Aberdeen", who had been a member of the society since 1570.

In 1633 the Sheriff Principal passed an act designating sixteen "ordinary advocates and procurators of the court" as the only persons entitled to conduct judicial proceedings. Thereafter, this body controlled the admission of applicants to legal practice. As a result, those seeking to join the legal profession were required to be members of the society, until the Law Agents (Scotland) Act 1873 removed the exclusive right of society members to appear in the local courts.

The society was granted its first Royal charter in 1774 by George III, who granted a second in 1799. A third was granted by Queen Victoria in 1862.

In 1782 the society agreed in a general meeting that classes in Scots Law should be taught in Aberdeen, rather than requiring aspiring legal practitioners to travel to Edinburgh. After some time, arrangements were made for a lecturer from the society to conduct classes in 'Scotch' law. The University of Aberdeen later commended the society's role in protecting the study of law through the 19th century; stating the Faculty of Law there may have ceased to exist if not for the Society of Advocates' efforts.

The society's library was founded in 1787 and now holds a remarkable collection of legal volumes, though the oldest book in its collection is Henry Savile's Rerum Anglicarum scriptores post Bedam (London, 1596).

Like many professions, the practice of law in Scotland was traditionally restricted to men. While the Sex Disqualification (Removal) Act 1919 removed this barrier, it wasn't until 1962 that the first female member of the society, Elizabeth Barnett of the firm A C Morrison & Richards, was admitted. In 2011, Elizabeth J W Mackinnon was elected to lead the Society as its first female president.

In 1996, as part of the spring issue of the Aberdeen University Review, the society's then executive secretary and librarian, Dorothea Bruce, published a brief history of the society.

== Use of the title Advocate in Aberdeen ==
Members of the society may use the title Advocate in Aberdeen, but despite the similarity in title they are predominantly drawn from the solicitor branch of the legal profession. The title Advocate is used by members of the Faculty of Advocates, another branch of the profession who practice at the Scottish Bar.

== Advocates Hall ==
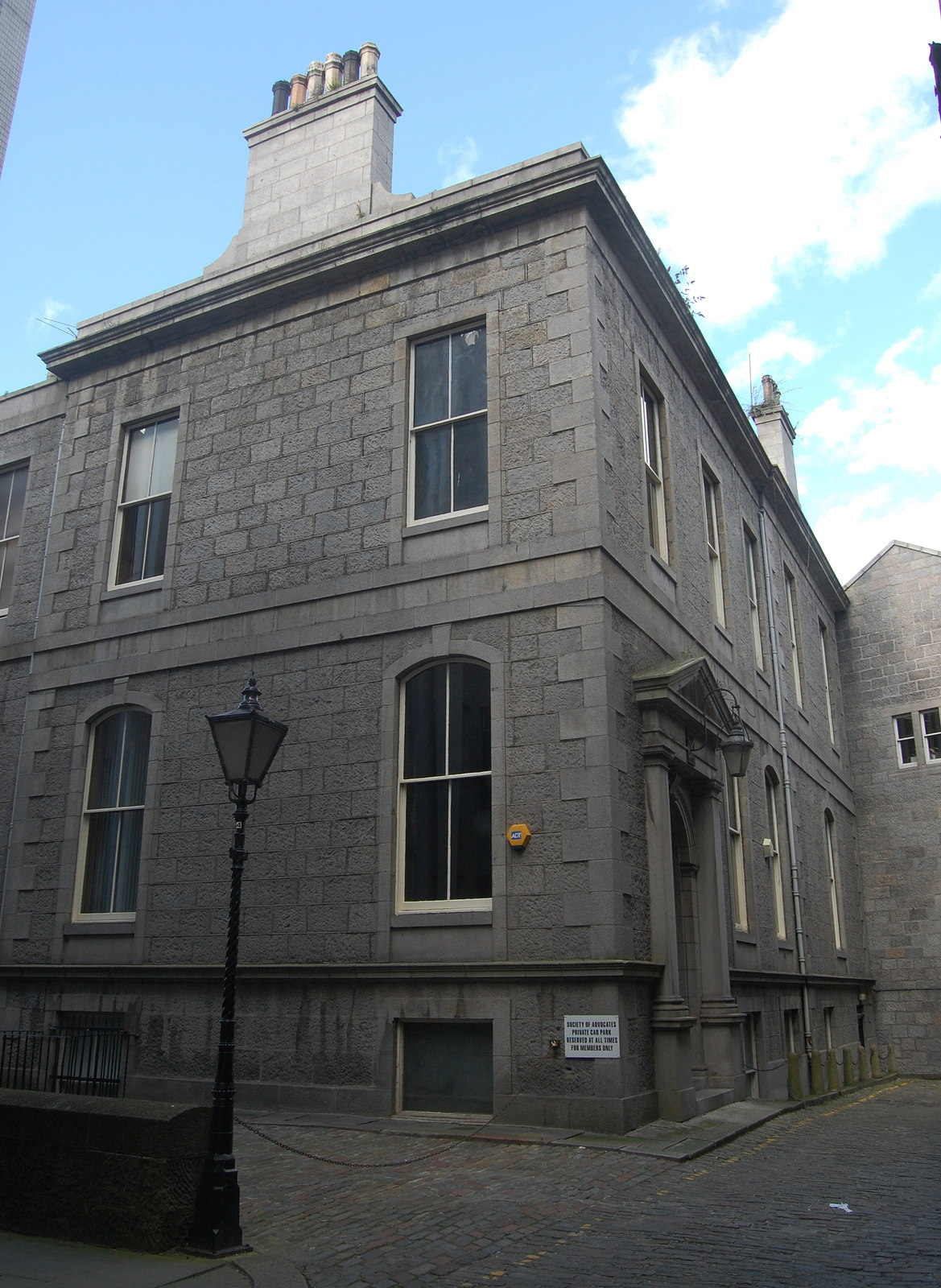
Advocates Hall

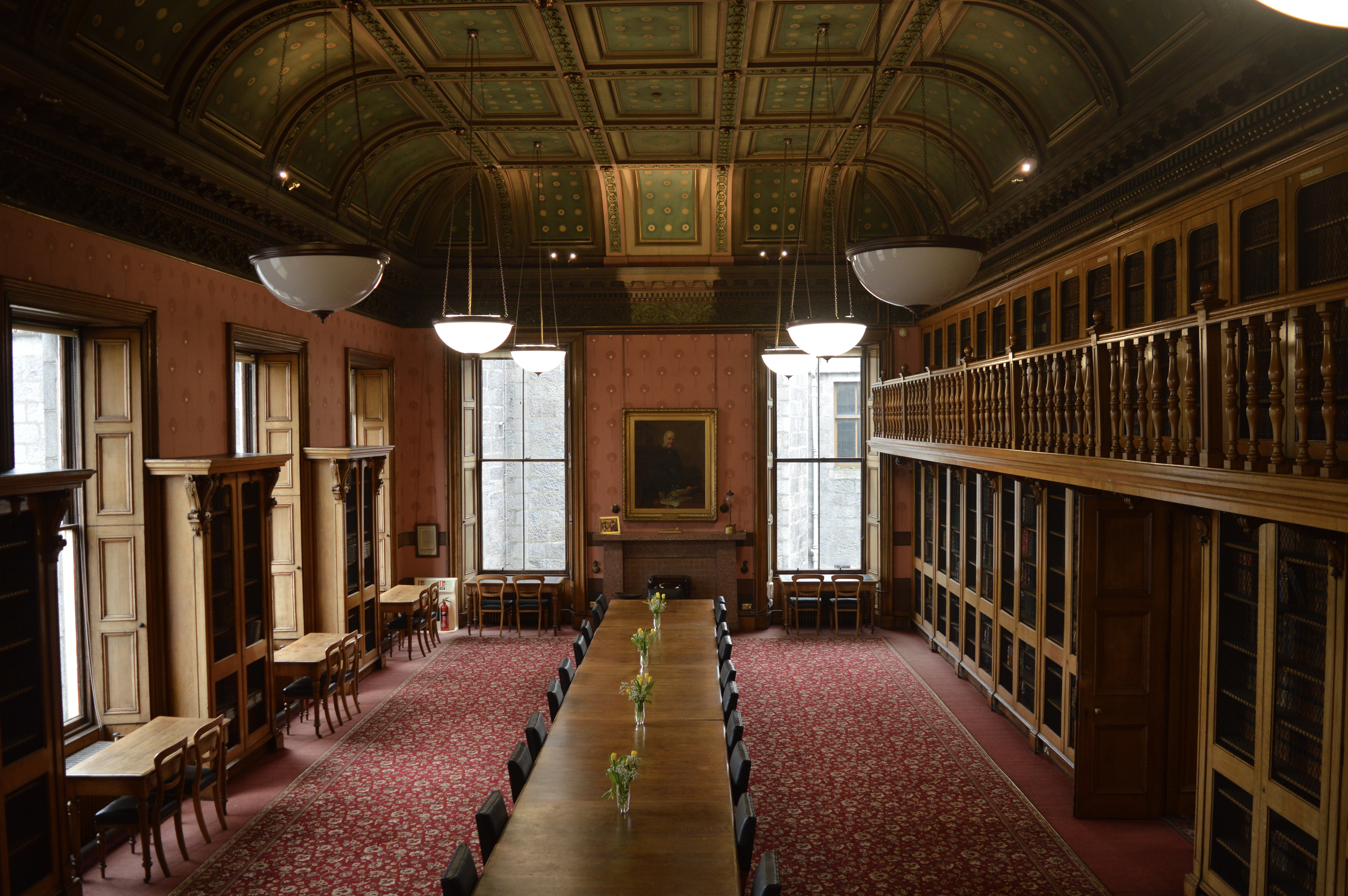
Library of the Society of Advocates in Aberdeen

Historically the society convened in various locations around Aberdeen, including the Records Office at Castlegate, Aberdeen. The library was housed there until damp was discovered in 1820, after which the society was provided with use of a room at the courthouse.

The first purpose-built Advocates Hall was designed by John Smith (architect) and constructed at the corner of Union Street and Back Wynd, adjacent to the churchyard of the Kirk of St Nicholas. It opened in 1837 and served as the society's home until the current Advocates Hall was built.

The current Advocates Hall at Concert Court was erected immediately beside the recently reconstructed Sheriff court buildings and a number of the fittings, such as fireplaces, were relocated from the previous premises.

The building, which is Category A listed, was designed by James Matthews (architect), and opened in 1870. Constructed as a two-storey building with basement, the upper floor contains a large reception area committee room and library with gallery, the fittings for which were designed by Arthur Clyne, a local architect.

A stained-glass window, produced by Daniel Cottier, overlooks the landing of stairs leading to the upper level.

The ground floor, previously the society's dining room, and basement, which once housed caretaker's accommodation and a substantial wine cellar, are now occupied by the sheriff court.

The society hosts many events at the library for its members throughout the year, but is also accessible to the public by private arrangement or through Aberdeen's annual Doors Open Days scheme.

== Membership ==
Though membership is no longer required to practice law in the region, the society continues to be well supported by the local profession.

Full membership is available for solicitors who have completed their professional training, with trainee membership available for those still to finish their 2-year traineeship period.

The society established their TANA (Trainee and New Advocate) group in 2011 to provide a more focused offering to those in the early years (up to 5 years post-qualified) of their legal careers.

Associate membership is available for those not qualified to practice law in Scotland who are connected with the provision of legal services (foreign qualified lawyers or paralegals) or in the training and education of law (legal academics) in the region.

== Arms ==
Coat of arms of Society of Advocates in Aberdeen

Notes
Granted 7 August 2024 by Joseph John Morrow, Lord Lyon King of Arms.
Crest
A hand holding a goose quill Proper.
Escutcheon
Gules on a chevron Argent between two towers triple-towered Argent masoned Sable in chief and an open book Proper in base an eagle-owl's head affrontee Proper between two maunches Sable.
Supporters
Dexter an Advocate in Aberdeen wearing court dress and sinister a leopard Proper.
