= Royal Faculty of Procurators in Glasgow =

Body of legal practitioners in Scotland

- Formation: Prior to 1668
- Type: Professional body
- Purpose: Serve the needs of the legal profession in Glasgow and West Central Scotland
- Headquarters: 12 Nelson Mandela Place
- Location: Glasgow
- Coordinates: 55.8622°N 4.2546°W
- Region served: Glasgow and West Central Scotland
- Dean: John Bett
- Main organ: Council
- Website: www.rfpg.org/

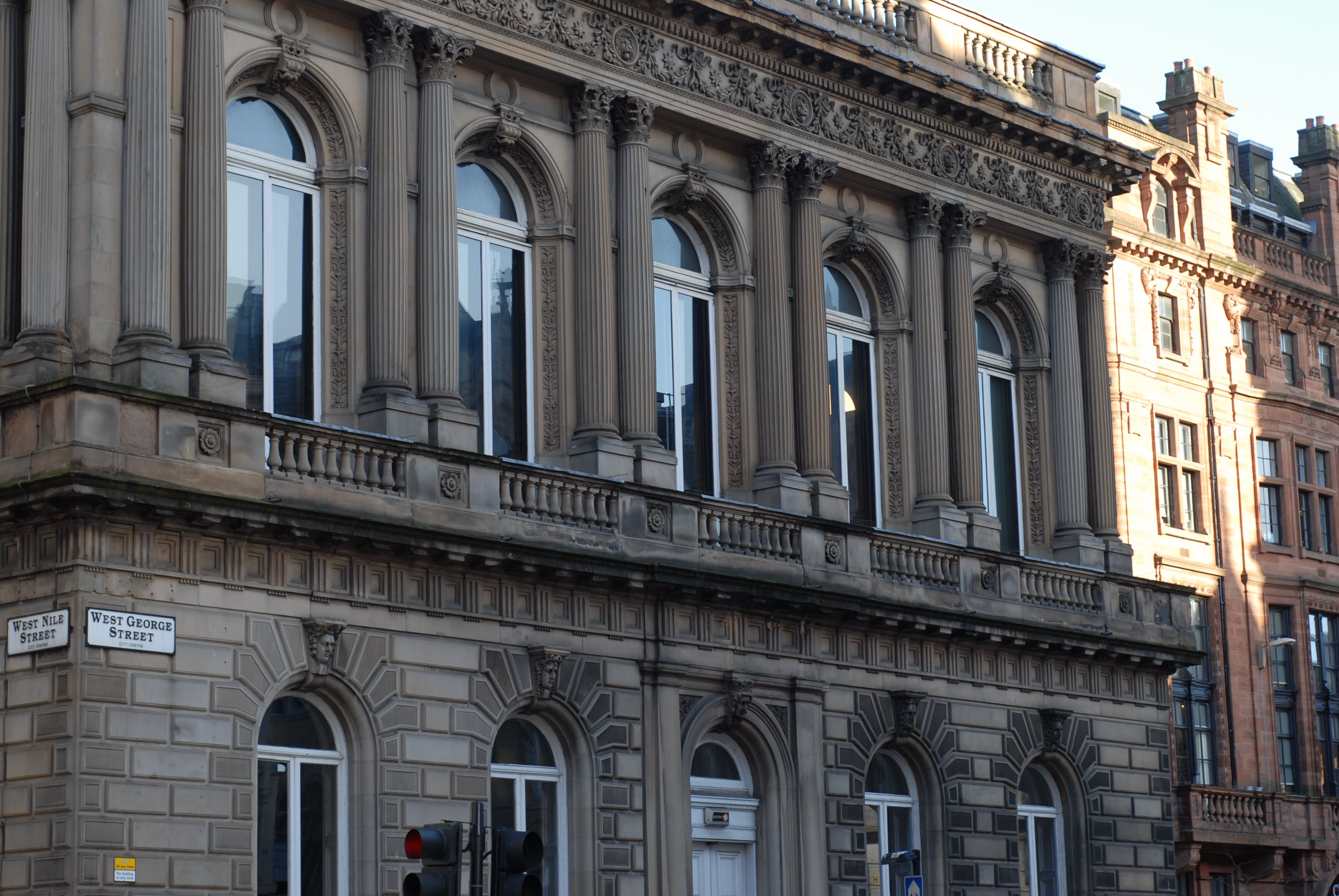
Faculty of Procurators Glasgow

The Royal Faculty of Procurators in Glasgow is a professional body of legal practitioners based in Glasgow and providing services to lawyers in the city and the surrounding area. The Faculty owns and operates the largest law library in the West of Scotland as well as a small branch library at Glasgow Sheriff Court, and runs a programme of continuing professional development (CPD) seminars.

The Faculty is similar to the Society of Writers to His Majesty's Signet (WS Society), a professional association of solicitors which maintains the Signet Library in Edinburgh, however these bodies play no regulatory role for their members, only providing services, and should be distinguished from the Law Society of Scotland and Faculty of Advocates, which are the respective regulatory bodies for solicitors and advocates in Scotland.

== History ==
The date of the Faculty's foundation is unknown, although it has existed since prior to 1668. A Royal Charter awarded by King George III on 6 June 1796 stated that "for centuries past the members of the Commissary Courts of Glasgow and of Hamilton and Campsie have been, and are now united into a Society called the Faculty of Procurators in Glasgow." This Charter entitled the Faculty to the call itself the Royal Faculty. A Library was established in 1817 and a permanent home for it opened in 1856. The Faculty established the Chair of Conveyancing in the University of Glasgow in 1861 and held the right of appointment until 1993.

The Faculty's position was eroded by the Law Agents (Scotland) Act 1873, which eliminated the exclusive right of Faculty members to appear in the Local Courts, and the Solicitors (Scotland) Act 1933 and Legal Aid and Solicitors (Scotland) 1949, which created the Law Society of Scotland as the national professional body for solicitors. Nowadays, it serves as a representative body for its members as well as providing library services, venue hire, auditor services and continuing professional development.

== Library ==
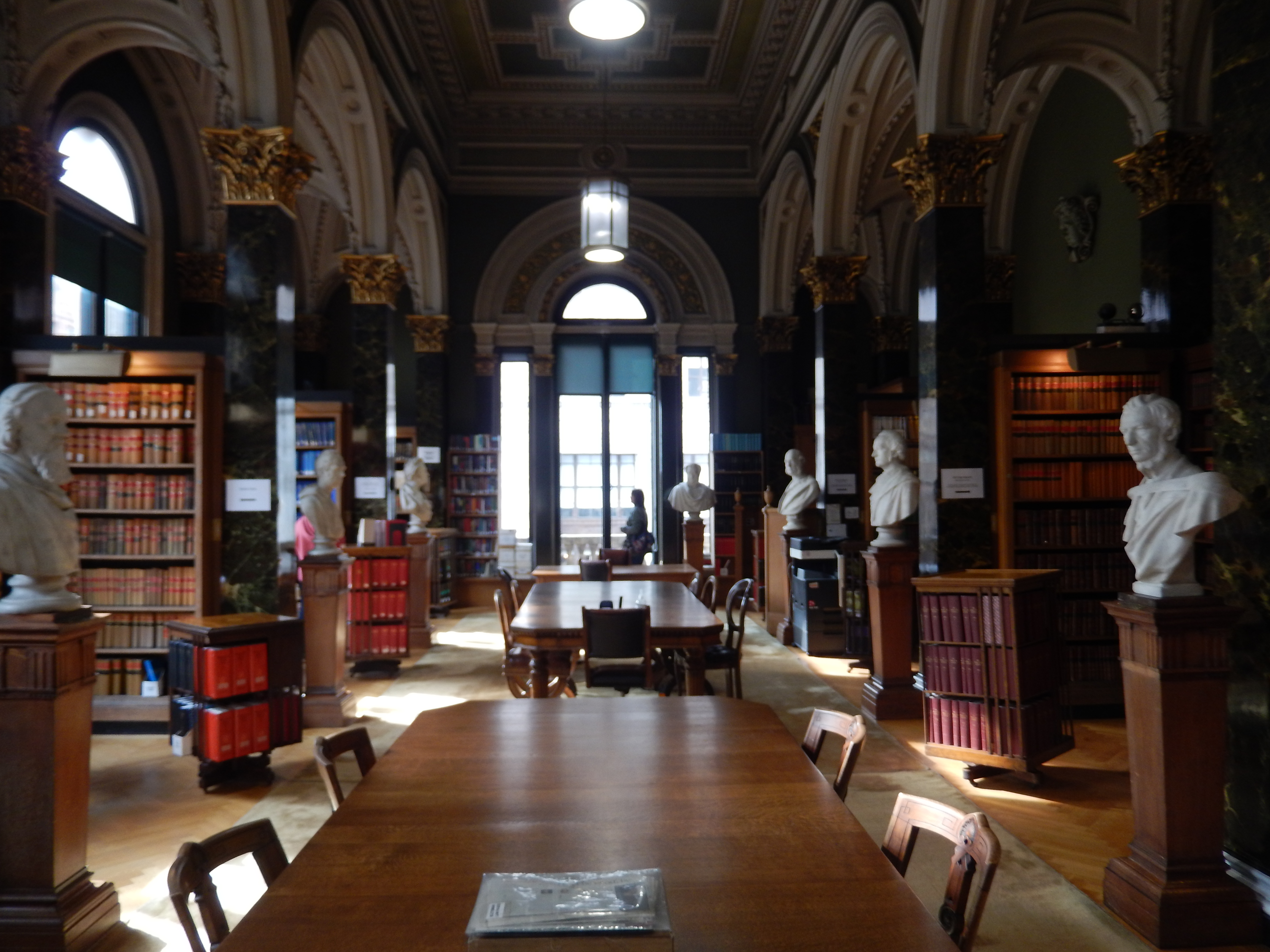
Library in Procurators' Hall

The Society is based at its Library on Nelson Mandela Place, off Buchanan Street in Glasgow's city centre. The maintenance of a library was first proposed in 1736, and one was eventually established in 1817. It moved in 1856 to its present location, a Venetian-style building by Charles Wilson, who also designed 22 Park Circus and Lews Castle on Stornoway. It became a Category A listed building in 1966. The Library has grown to become the largest law library in the West of Scotland, covering all practice areas. It contains series of law reports, purchases copies of every legal text published and increasingly provides electronic resources to members. It is also available to hire as a venue for meetings and private events.

== See also ==
- Society of Writers to Her Majesty's Signet
- Society of Advocates in Aberdeen
- Law Society of Scotland
- Faculty of Advocates
