= Roberto Guerra Perez =

Cuban journalist

Roberto de Jesús Guerra Pérez (Media Luna, Granma, Cuba, September 19, 1978) is a Cuban independent journalist and blogger. He completed studies only up to 9th grade, as the Cuban authorities sentenced him to a year and six months of forced labor at the age of 14 for criticizing the food rationing system.

== Early life ==
Guerra Pérez, had a nomadic life with his five brothers and faced extreme poverty. His parents Engracio War (1926–2001) and Consuelo Perez (1956), were both very poor farmers in the eastern part of the country. From age 9, he needed to take several jobs to help his family. At age 14, after leaving school, he worked selling candy, as a farmer, as a security guard and as a livestock business manager in charge of three farms.

== Later life ==
In 2003, he was living in Havana, where he met several dissidents and human rights activists. His new connections inspired him to join the opposition movement as a way to channel his disenchantment with the Cuban revolution. After his first hunger strike in 2005, he was sentenced to two years' imprisonment for public disorder. It would not be his last hunger strike (8) or its last detention (180).

In 2009, he founded the cihpress.com as an independent news agency to break with government censorship and inform the world about the events official media tried to silence. His goal was to create a system for the collection and dissemination of information and for the training of journalists and collaborators throughout Cuba.

Today, Hablemos Press counts with more than 100 collaborators, its own website, more than 1,000 visitors per day, more than 250 videos on YouTube and 400-600 weekly copies of the Hablemos Press newspaper. They report from and for Cuba on politics, culture, commerce, finance, art, literature, and sports—anything that's news. And they continue to do it despite government repression against their journalists.

He has participated in dozens of events in countries such as Sweden (2 *), Norway, Germany, Lithuania (2), Belarusian border, Czech Republic, Poland (2) United States (3), Mexico (2), Panama (2), Argentina and others, from 2013, the Cuban government allowed citizens to leave the island.

He gave a lecture on the state of press freedom in Cuba, at the Oslo Freedom Forum in Oslo, Norway 2013, at the Inter-American Commission on Human Rights, Washington, USA 2014, and at the Forum on Freedom of Expression, parallel to the VII Summit of the Americas 2015.

The Human Rights.Gov (digital portal of the Office of Policy Planning and Public Diplomacy in the Bureau of Democracy, Human Rights and Labor of the State Department of the United States) in September 2014 highlighted the personality of Guerra Perez for his work in defense of freedom of expression and his effort to share free information in the island
