= Sir James Roberton =

Scottish lawyer and professor

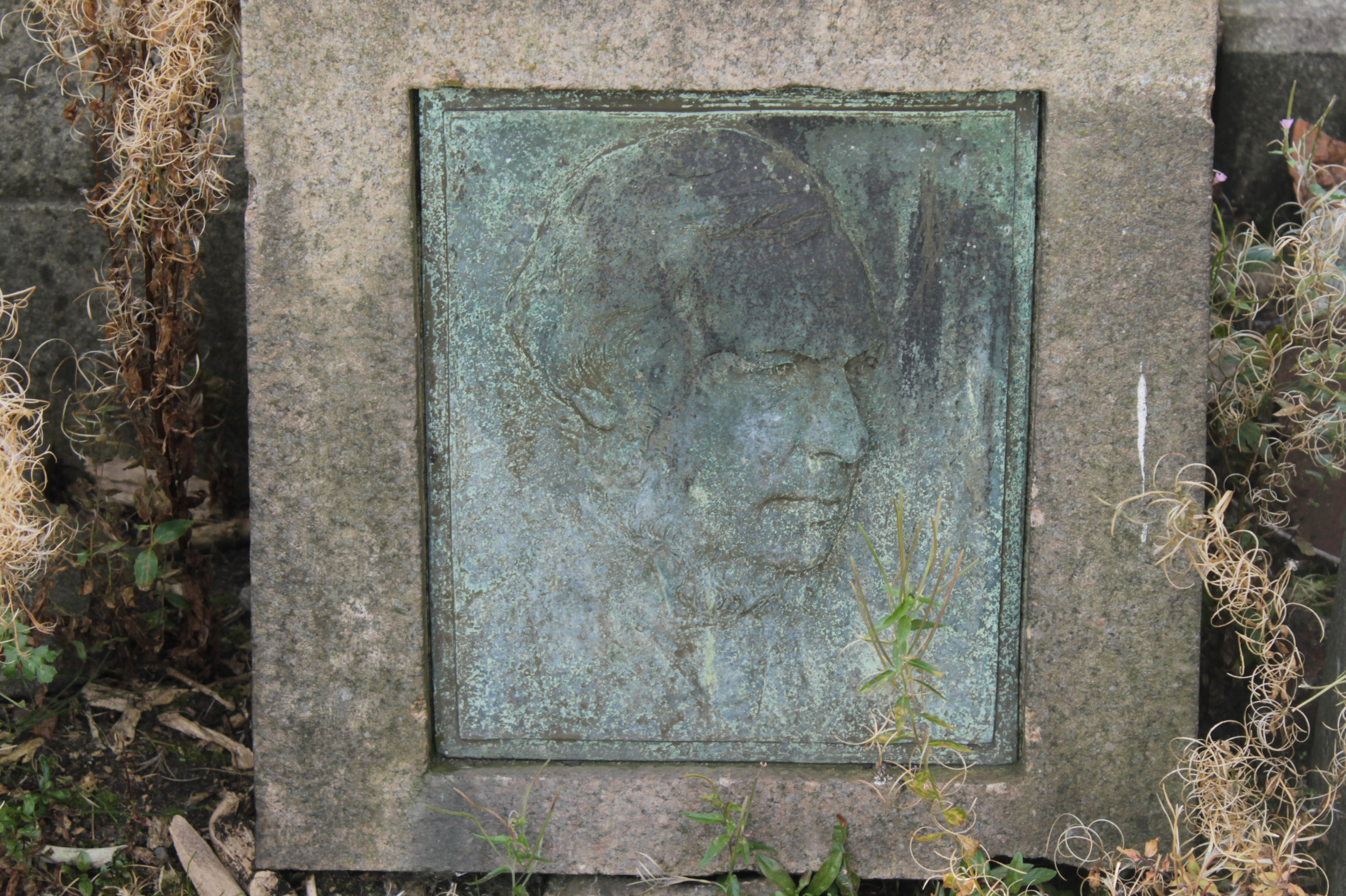
Sir James Roberton, Glasgow Necropolis

Sir James Roberton FRSE LLD (1821–1889) was a 19th-century Scottish lawyer and Professor of Conveyancing at Glasgow University. The university's James Roberton Memorial Prize is named after him.

His Glasgow law firm evolved into Mitchells Roberton and continues to operate.

== Life ==
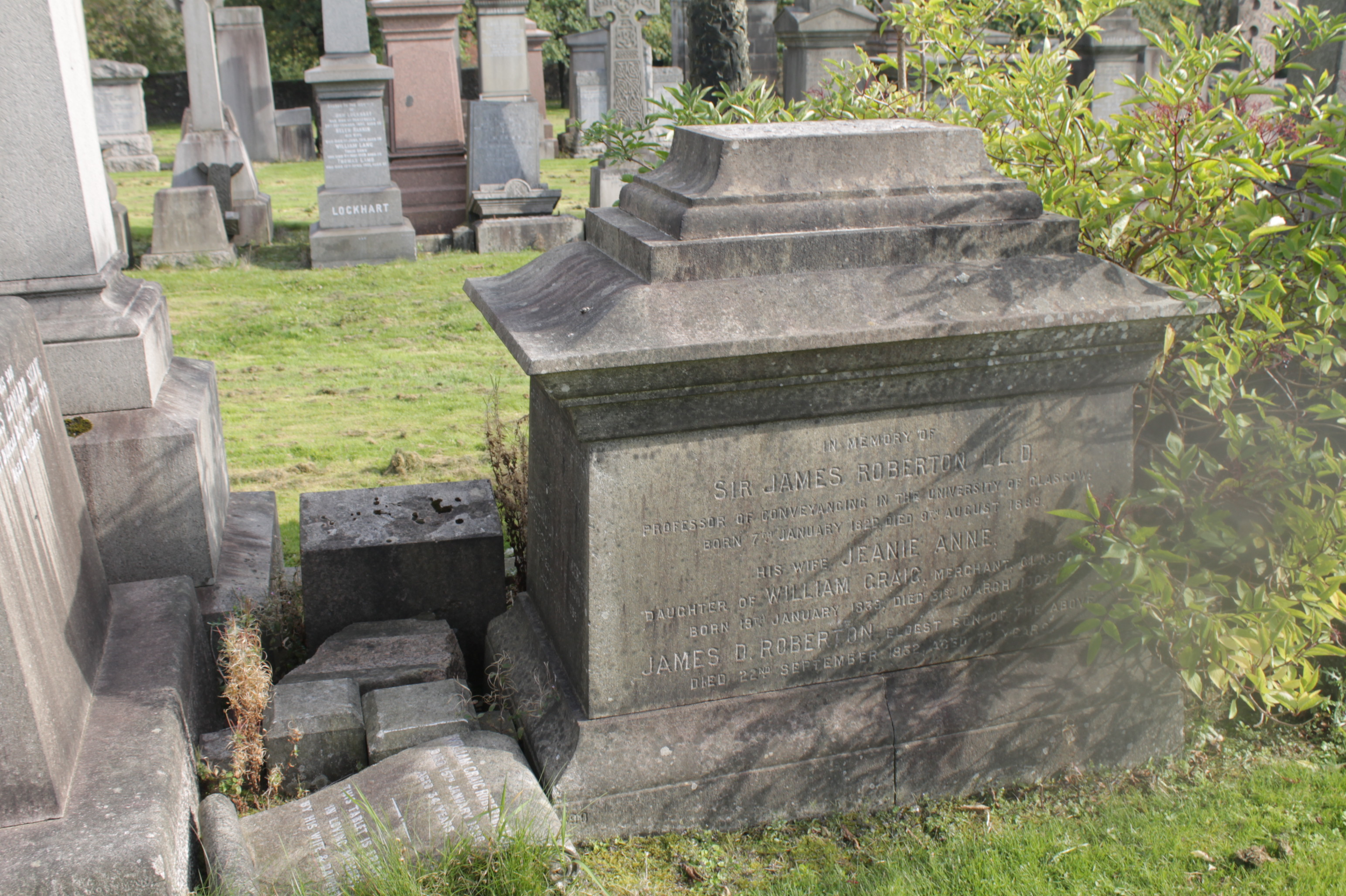
The grave of Sir James Roberton, Glasgow Necropolis

He was born on 7 January 1820 in Dalmarnock the son of a farmer. He studied law at Glasgow University.

He first came to note as a partner in Towers-Clerk Roberton & Ross.

In 1867 he became Professor of Conveyancing at Glasgow University.

In 1877 he was elected a Fellow of the Royal Society of Edinburgh. His proposers were William Thomson, Lord Kelvin, Anderson Kirkwood, Allen Thomson, and Sir Robert Christison.

From 1885 he served as Dean of the Faculty of Advocates in Glasgow.

In June 1889 he was knighted by Queen Victoria. He died soon afterwards on 9 August 1889. He is buried in the Glasgow Necropolis. The grave lies in one of the north–south lines in the eastern section of the upper plateau. The grave is vandalised and his bronze portrait lies behind the main stone.

== Family ==
He was married to Jeannie Ann Craig (1839-1907), daughter of William Craig, a Glasgow merchant. Their son James D Roberton died in 1932.

== Artistic recognition ==
His portrait photograph by Thomas Annan is held by the Scottish National Portrait Gallery.
