= Bruno Praxedes =

Brazilian footballer (born 2002)

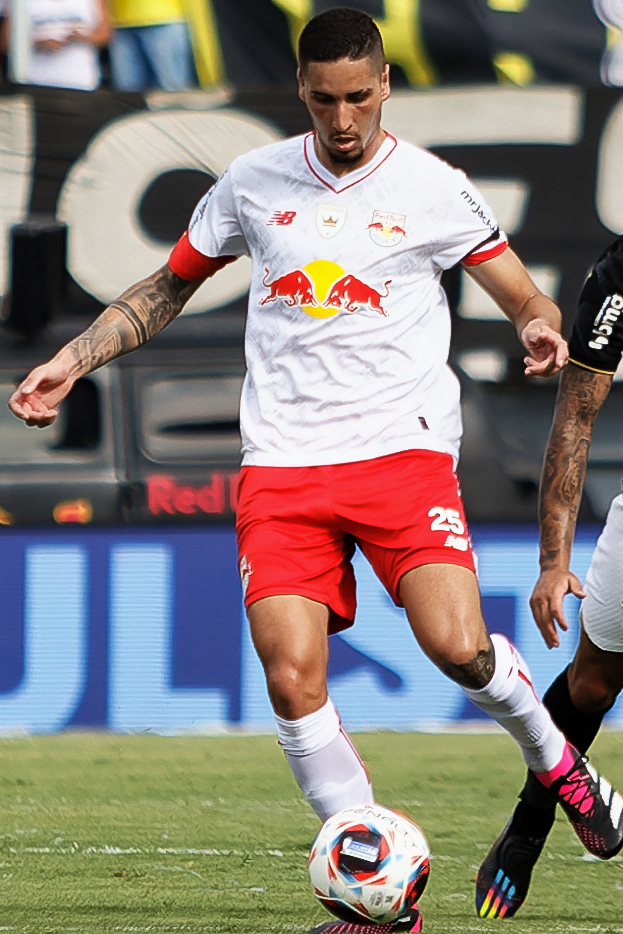
- Praxedes with Red Bull Bragantino in 2023

Personal information
- Full name: Bruno Conceição Praxedes
- Date of birth: 8 February 2002 (age 24)
- Place of birth: Itaboraí, Brazil
- Height: 1.86 m (6 ft 1 in)
- Position: Midfielder

Team information
- Current team: Red Bull Bragantino
- Number: 25

Youth career
- 2013–2019: Fluminense

Senior career*
Years	Team	Apps	(Gls)
2019–2021	Internacional	43	(2)
2021–	Red Bull Bragantino	71	(6)
2023–2024	→ Vasco da Gama (loan)	34	(2)
2024	→ Athletico Paranaense (loan)	7	(0)

International career^{‡}
2017	Brazil U17	3	(0)
2020	Brazil U20	3	(0)
- * Club domestic league appearances and goals as of 14 December 2025 ‡ National team caps and goals as of 10 January 2021

Bruno Conceição Praxedes (born 8 February 2002), known as Bruno Praxedes or just Praxedes, is a Brazilian professional footballer who plays as a midfielder for Red Bull Bragantino.

== Professional career ==
Praxedes made his professional debut with Internacional in a 0–0 Campeonato Gaúcho draw with Ypiranga on 1 February 2020.
