= Roberto Hernández =

Roberto Hernández may refer to:

== Sports ==
- Roberto Hernandez Jr. (1938–2017), Mexican sportscaster
- Roberto Hernández (relief pitcher) (born 1964), Puerto Rican baseball player
- Roberto Hernández (Chilean footballer) (born 1964), Chilean football manager and former defender
- Roberto Hernández (Mexican footballer) (born 1967), Mexican football manager and former defender
- Roberto Hernández (Uruguayan footballer) (born 1994), Uruguayan football defender
- Roberto Hernández (sprinter) (1967–2021), Cuban athlete
- Roberto Hernández (starting pitcher) (born 1980), Dominican baseball player, formerly known as Fausto Carmona
- Roberto Hernández (archer) (born 1989), El Salvadoran archer

== Others ==
- Roberto Hernández Ramírez (born 1942), Mexican businessman
- Roberto Hernández Vélez, Puerto Rican politician and former mayor of Corozal
- Roberto Hernández (filmmaker), Mexican filmmaker and lawyer, director of the 2009 documentary Presumed Guilty
- Roberto Aguilar Hernández (born 1964), Mexican politician
