= Brodies =

Scottish law firm

Brodies LLP
- Firm's logo
- Type: Limited Liability Partnership
- Industry: Law
- Headquarters: Edinburgh, Scotland, UK
- Area served: United Kingdom
- Services: Legal advice
- Revenue: £126.7m (2025)
- Owners: 115 partners
- Website: www.brodies.com

Brodies LLP is a Scottish law firm, headquartered in Edinburgh.

== Awards ==
- UK Law Firm of the Year 2014, British Legal Awards

== Chairs (from 2004) ==
- 2025–Present Iain Rutherford
- 2013-2025 Christine O'Neill KC
- 2004-2013 Joyce Cullen

== Managing partners (from 1997) ==
- 2024–Present Stephen Goldie
- 2018-2024 Nick Scott
- 1997-2018 Bill Drummond
