= Roberto Rojas (disambiguation) =

Roberto Rojas (born 1957) is a Chilean footballer.

Roberto Rojas may also refer to:

- Roberto Rojas (Peruvian footballer) (1955–1991), Peruvian footballer
- Roberto Rojas (politician) (1966–2022), Bolivian politician
- Roberto Rojas (Spanish footballer) (born 1974), Spanish footballer

== See also ==
- Robert Rojas (born 1996), Paraguayan footballer
- Roberto Roxas (born 1946), Filipino cyclist
