= Roberto (footballer, born 1998) =

Brazilian footballer

Personal information
- Full name: Roberto Pinheiro da Rosa
- Date of birth: 3 June 1998 (age 28)
- Place of birth: Porto Alegre, Brazil
- Height: 1.88 m (6 ft 2 in)
- Position: Centre-back

Team information
- Current team: Brusque
- Number: 16

Youth career
- 2014–2019: Internacional

Senior career*
| Years | Team | Apps | (Gls) |
| 2019–2022 | Internacional | 19 | (0) |
| 2020 | → Paraná (loan) | 3 | (0) |
| 2021 | → CRB (loan) | 2 | (0) |
| 2023–2024 | Avaí | 41 | (0) |
| 2025 | Inter de Limeira | 8 | (0) |
| 2025– | Brusque | 18 | (0) |
- * Club domestic league appearances and goals as of 2 February 2026

Roberto Pinheiro da Rosa (born 3 June 1998), simply known as Roberto, is a Brazilian footballer who plays as a centre-back for Brusque.

== Career ==
Roberto joined the youth academy of Internacional in 2014. He made his professional debut with Internacional in a 1–0 Campeonato Gaúcho win over Esporte Clube São Luiz on 20 January 2019. On 3 March 2019, Roberto signed a three-year contract with Internacional until 2022.
