= Mitchells Roberton =

- Headquarters: Glasgow, Scotland, UK

Mitchells Roberton is a law firm located on George Square in the city center of Glasgow, Scotland. It is the oldest law firm in Glasgow, dating back to the 18th century. Operating on an egalitarian basis.

== Areas of law covered ==
- Private client practice
  - Tax
  - Trusts and estates
  - Family law
- Commercial property
- Security
- Debt Recovery
- Litigation
- Pensions
- General commercial advice
- Financial planning advice
- Estate agency
- Residencial Conveyancing

== Staff ==
=== Partners ===
- Donald Reid
- Ronald Inglis
- Ian Ferguson
- Morag Inglis
- Ross Leatham
- Joel Conn
- Paul Neilly
- Neil MacKenzie
