= 2026 São Paulo FC season =

São Paulo
2026 season
- Chairman: Julio Casares (suspended from 16 January 2026; resigned on 21 January 2026); Harry Massis Júnior (interim from 16 January 2026; officially announced on 21 January 2026)
- Manager: Hernán Crespo (until 9 March 2026); Roger Machado (from 10 March to 13 May 2026); Milton Cruz (caretaker, on 16 May 2026); Dorival Júnior (from 18 May 2026)
- Stadium: Morumbi
- Campeonato Brasileiro Série A: 10th
- Campeonato Paulista: Semi-final
- Copa do Brasil: Fifth round
- Copa Sudamericana: Quarter-finals
- Top goalscorer: League: Jonathan Calleri (10); All: Jonathan Calleri (16)
Home colors	Away colors	Home (alt) colors

The 2026 season will be São Paulo's 97th season in the club's history and their 66th in the top-flight of Brazilian football. Along with Série A, São Paulo compete in the Campeonato Paulista, Copa do Brasil and Copa Sudamericana.

== First-team squad ==
As of 14 September 2026

Note: Flags indicate national team as defined under FIFA eligibility rules; some limited exceptions apply. Players may hold more than one non-FIFA nationality.

No.	Pos.	Nation	Player
2	DF	ITA	Rafael Tolói
5	DF	ECU	Robert Arboleda
7	FW	BRA	Lucas Moura (vice-captain)
8	MF	BRA	Marcos Antônio
9	FW	ARG	Jonathan Calleri (captain)
10	FW	BRA	Luciano
11	FW	BRA	Ferreira
12	DF	BRA	Iago Borduchi (on loan from Bahia)
16	MF	PAR	Damián Bobadilla
17	FW	BRA	André Silva
18	DF	BRA	Wendell
19	DF	BRA	Lucas Ramon
20	DF	POR	Aurélio Buta
22	DF	POR	Domingos Duarte
23	GK	BRA	Rafael (3rd-captain)
27	FW	BRA	Victor Sá

No.	Pos.	Nation	Player
28	MF	BRA	Newton
29	MF	BRA	Pablo Maia
31	GK	PAR	Carlos Coronel
32	DF	BRA	Pedro Lima (on loan from Wolverhampton)
35	DF	BRA	Sabino
37	FW	BRA	Arthur (on loan from Botafogo)
43	FW	BRA	Gustavo Santana
45	FW	BRA	Lucca Marques
48	MF	BRA	Djhordney
49	FW	BRA	Ryan Francisco
52	GK	BRA	Felipe Preis
54	DF	BRA	Luis Osorio
56	DF	BRA	Nicolas Bosshardt
80	MF	BRA	Cauly (on loan from Bahia)
94	MF	BRA	Danielzinho

=== Youth players ===
As of 15 November 2026 (Copa São Paulo de Futebol Jr. squad and others)

Note: Flags indicate national team as defined under FIFA eligibility rules; some limited exceptions apply. Players may hold more than one non-FIFA nationality.

No.	Pos.	Nation	Player
—	GK	BRA	João Paulo
41	GK	BRA	João Pedro
—	DF	BRA	Angelo
—	DF	BRA	Felipe
—	DF	BRA	Guilherme Reis
—	DF	BRA	Hugo Martins
51	DF	BRA	Igão
40	DF	BRA	Igor Felisberto
53	DF	BRA	Isac Silvestre
—	DF	BOL	Lysander
—	DF	BRA	Lucas Miranda
—	DF	BRA	Marques Rickelme
—	DF	IDN	Welber Jardim
—	MF	BRA	Bezerra
—	MF	BRA	Davi Pena
—	MF	BRA	Dudu
—	MF	BRA	Guilherme Calci
—	MF	BRA	Guilherme Fumaça
—	MF	BRA	Gustavo Zabarelli
—	MF	BRA	Kauã Edmar

No.	Pos.	Nation	Player
—	MF	BRA	Kevem
—	MF	BRA	Luiz Fernando
—	MF	BRA	Matheus Ferreira
—	MF	BRA	Nicolas Pereira
46	MF	BRA	Pedro Ferreira
—	MF	BRA	Renan Lassalvia
—	MF	BRA	Samuel Monteiro
—	FW	BRA	Brenno
—	FW	BRA	Guilherme Lino
—	FW	BRA	Gustavo Miranda
—	FW	BRA	João Costa
—	FW	COL	Juan Potes
—	FW	BRA	Léo Amaro
—	FW	BRA	Lucyan
—	FW	GUA	Marvin Ávila Jr
—	FW	BRA	Matheus Menezes
—	FW	BRA	Nicolas Kauan
—	FW	BRA	Robert Willian
34	FW	BRA	Tetê

=== Other players under contract ===
Note: Flags indicate national team as defined under FIFA eligibility rules; some limited exceptions apply. Players may hold more than one non-FIFA nationality.

No. / Pos. / Nation / Player; — / DF / POR / Cédric Soares	No. / Pos. / Nation / Player; — / DF / ARG / Enzo Díaz

=== Out on loan ===
Note: Flags indicate national team as defined under FIFA eligibility rules; some limited exceptions apply. Players may hold more than one non-FIFA nationality.

No.	Pos.	Nation	Player
—	GK	BRA	Jandrei (at Juventude until 31 December 2026)
—	DF	ARG	Alan Franco (at Tigres UANL until 30 June 2027)
—	DF	BRA	Maik (at Dukla Banská Bystrica until 30 June 2027)
—	DF	BRA	Maílton (at Fortaleza until 31 December 2026)
—	DF	BRA	Patryck Lanza (at Juventude until 31 December 2026)
—	MF	BRA	Alisson (at Fluminense until 31 December 2026)

No.	Pos.	Nation	Player
—	MF	BRA	Cauã Lucca (at Luverdense until 31 December 2026)
—	MF	BRA	Felipe Negrucci (at Athletic-MG until 31 December 2026)
—	MF	BRA	Hugo Leonardo (at Mito HollyHock until 31 December 2026)
—	MF	SEN	Iba Ly (at Juventude until 31 December 2026)
—	FW	CHI	Gonzalo Tapia (at Columbus Crew until 31 July 2027)
—	FW	BRA	Paulinho (at Torreense until 30 June 2027)

=== Retired numbers ===
- 01 – (Brazil) Rogério Ceni, Goalkeeper (1990–2015)

== Transfers ==
=== Transfers in ===
Entry date	Position	Player	From club	Fee	Ref.
12 December 2025	MF	(Brazil) Danielzinho	(Brazil) Mirassol	Free transfer	
24 December 2025	GK	(Paraguay) Carlos Coronel	(United States) New York Red Bulls	Free transfer	
31 December 2025	DF	(Argentina) Enzo Díaz	(Argentina) River Plate	R$ 11.0 M	
31 December 2025	FW	(Chile) Gonzalo Tapia	(Argentina) River Plate	R$ 13.0 M	
9 January 2026	DF	(Brazil) Dória	(Mexico) Atlas	Free transfer	
30 January 2026	DF	(Brazil) Lucas Ramon	(Brazil) Mirassol	Free transfer	
3 February 2026	MF	(Brazil) Djhordney	(Brazil) Novorizontino	R$ 1.0 M	
27 February 2026	MF	(Brazil) Marcos Antônio	(Italy) Lazio	R$ 27.1 M	
3 March 2026	DF	(Brazil) João Moreira	(Portugal) Porto B	End of loan	
1 July 2026	FW	(Brazil) Victor Sá	(Russia) FC Krasnodar	Free transfer	
13 July 2026	DF	(Portugal) Domingos Duarte	(Spain) Getafe	Free transfer	
15 July 2026	MF	(Brazil) Newton	(Brazil) Botafogo	R$ 17.5 M	
16 July 2026	DF	(Portugal) Aurélio Buta	(Denmark) Copenhagen	Free transfer	

=== Loans in ===
Entry date	Position	Player	From club	Fee	Ref.
12 February 2026	MF	(Brazil) Cauly	(Brazil) Bahia	R$ 3.0 M	
28 March 2026	FW	(Brazil) Arthur	(Brazil) Botafogo	None	
1 August 2026	DF	(Brazil) Iago Borduchi	(Brazil) Bahia	None	
14 September 2026	DF	(Brazil) Pedro Lima	(England) Wolverhampton	None	

=== Transfers out ===
Entry date	Position	Player	To club	Fee	Ref.
8 December 2025	FW	(Argentina) Juan Dinenno	(Colombia) Deportivo Cali	End of contract	
8 December 2025	GK	(Brazil) Leandro	(Brazil) Botafogo-PB	End of contract	
10 December 2025	MF	(Brazil) Luiz Gustavo	(Brazil) Athletico Paranaense	End of contract	
11 December 2025	FW	(Argentina) Emiliano Rigoni	(Argentina) Belgrano	End of contract	
12 December 2025	MF	(Brazil) Oscar	Retired	Contract terminated by mutual consent	
29 December 2025	FW	(Brazil) Erick	(Brazil) Vitória	R$ 7.3 M	
31 December 2025	GK	(Brazil) Roberto	(Brazil) Santa Catarina	End of contract	
31 December 2025	MF	(Argentina) Giuliano Galoppo	(Argentina) River Plate	R$ 25.0 M	
2 January 2026	DF	(Brazil) Andrade	(Estonia) Paide Linnameeskond	Contract terminated by mutual consent	
8 January 2026	MF	(Brazil) Rodriguinho	(Brazil) Red Bull Bragantino	R$ 19.0 M	
2 February 2026	MF	(Brazil) Enzo Juan	(Spain) Rayo Cantabria	Contract terminated by mutual consent	
7 May 2026	FW	(Brazil) Thierry Henry	(Brazil) Santo André	Contract terminated by mutual consent	
21 May 2026	DF	(Brazil) Dória	(Turkey) Batman Petrolspor	Contract terminated by mutual consent	
1 July 2026	DF	(Brazil) Raphael Gogoni	Unattached	End of contract	
6 July 2026	DF	(Brazil) Henrique Bell	(Austria) Rheindorf Altach	Free transfer	
8 July 2026	DF	(Brazil) Belém	(Azerbaijan) Qabala	Free transfer	
14 July 2026	GK	(Brazil) Young	(Portugal) Portimonense	Contract terminated by mutual consent	
23 July 2026	DF	(Brazil) João Moreira	(United Arab Emirates) Al-Nasr	Free transfer	
21 August 2026	DF	(Venezuela) Nahuel Ferraresi	(Brazil) Botafogo	R$ 17.5 M	
31 August 2026	GK	(Brazil) Luciano	(Brazil) FC Cascavel	Free transfer	
11 September 2026	MF	(Brazil) Luan	Unattached	Contract terminated by mutual consent	
13 September 2026	MF	(Brazil) Anthonny	(Brazil) Grêmio	Free transfer	
14 September 2026	DF	(Brazil) Geovanne Cuiabano	(Brazil) Palmeiras	Free transfer	
15 November 2026	DF	(Brazil) Kaio Santos	Unattached	Contract terminated by mutual consent	
15 November 2026	MF	(Brazil) Nicolas Borges	(Brazil) EC São Bernardo	Free transfer	

=== Loans out ===
Entry date	Position	Player	To club	Fee	Ref.
19 December 2025	DF	(Brazil) Patryck Lanza	(Brazil) Juventude	None	
25 December 2025	DF	(Brazil) Belém	(Brazil) Camboriú	None	
25 December 2025	DF	(Brazil) Maílton	(Brazil) Fortaleza	None	
2 January 2026	MF	(Senegal) Iba Ly	(Brazil) Juventude	None	
5 February 2026	MF	(Brazil) Cauã Lucca	(Brazil) Manaus	None	
6 March 2026	MF	(Brazil) Alisson	(Brazil) Fluminense	None	
9 March 2026	MF	(Venezuela) Nahuel Ferraresi	(Brazil) Botafogo	R$ 0.4 M	
6 July 2026	MF	(Brazil) Cauã Lucca	(Brazil) Luverdense	None	
13 July 2026	DF	(Argentina) Alan Franco	(Mexico) Tigres UANL	R$ 2.5 M	
16 July 2026	MF	(Brazil) Felipe Negrucci	(Brazil) Athletic-MG	None	
1 August 2026	FW	(Chile) Gonzalo Tapia	(United States) Columbus Crew	R$ 8.3 M	
27 August 2026	MF	(Brazil) Hugo Leonardo	(Japan) Mito HollyHock	None	
31 August 2026	FW	(Brazil) Paulinho	(Portugal) Torreense	None	
7 September 2026	DF	(Brazil) Maik	(Slovakia) Dukla Banská Bystrica	None	

== Competitions ==
=== Overview ===
Competition	First match	Last match	Starting round	Final position	Record							
Competition	First match	Last match	Starting round	Final position	Pld	W	D	L	GF	GA	GD	Win %
Série A	28 January 2026	2 December 2026	Matchday 1	TBD	34	12	8	14	39	39	+0	35.29
Campeonato Paulista	11 January 2026	1 March 2026	League phase	Semi-final	10	5	1	4	14	15	−1	50.00
Copa do Brasil	21 April 2026	13 May 2026	Fifth round	Fifth round	2	1	0	1	2	3	−1	50.00
Copa Sudamericana	7 April 2026	15 September 2026	Group stage	Quarter-finals	10	4	5	1	11	5	+6	40.00
Total					56	22	14	20	66	62	+4	39.29

Last updated: 4 November 2026
Source: Competitions

=== Campeonato Paulista ===
Pos	Team	Pld	W	D	L	GF	GA	GD	Pts	Qualification
4	Portuguesa	8	5	0	3	11	7	+4	15	Qualification for the Quarter-finals
5	Corinthians	8	4	2	2	10	6	+4	14	Qualification for the Quarter-finals
6	São Paulo	8	4	1	3	11	12	−1	13	Qualification for the Quarter-finals
7	Capivariano	8	4	1	3	7	10	−3	13	Qualification for the Quarter-finals
8	Santos	8	3	3	2	12	7	+5	12	Qualification for the Quarter-finals

Source: FPF
Rules for classification: 1) points; 2) wins; 3) goal difference; 4) goals scored; 5) head-to-head results (only between 2 teams); 6) fewest red cards; 7) fewest yellow cards; 8) draw.

==== Results by round ====
Round	1	2	3	4	5	6	7	8
Ground	A	H	A	H	A	H	H	A
Result	L	W	D	L	L	W	W	W
Position	14	10	10	14	14	11	8	6
Points	0	3	4	4	4	7	10	13

Source: Soccerway
A = Away; H = Home; W = Win; D = Draw; L = Loss; P = Postponed

==== Matches ====
11 January 2026 1	Mirassol	3–0	São Paulo	Mirassol
20:30 (UTC−3)	Lucas Mugni 7'; Alan Franco 20' (o.g.); Neto Moura (yellow card) 48'; José Aldo 89'	Report	Ferraresi (yellow card) 73'; Maik (red card) 83'	Stadium: Estádio José Maria de Campos Maia; Attendance: 8,167; Referee: Matheus Delgado Candançan

15 January 2026 2	São Paulo	1–0	São Bernardo	São Paulo
21:45 (UTC−3)	Wendell (yellow card) 32'; Luciano 79'	Report	João Paulo (yellow card) 17'; Pará (yellow card) 50'; Pedro Vitor (yellow card) 57'; Mário Sérgio (yellow card) 78'; Wellington Manzoli (yellow card) 83'	Stadium: Morumbi; Attendance: 16,984; Referee: Murilo Tarrega Victor

18 January 2026 3	Corinthians	1–1	São Paulo	São Paulo
16:00 (UTC−3)	André (yellow card) 9'; Yuri Alberto (yellow card) 30'; Carrillo (yellow card) 45+1'; Bidon 90'	Report	Wendell (yellow card) 2'; Marcos Antônio (yellow card) 21'; Tapia 37', (yellow card) 76'; Rafael (yellow card) 66'; Luciano (yellow card) 90+2'	Stadium: Neo Química Arena; Attendance: 44,769; Referee: João Vitor Gobi

21 January 2026 4	São Paulo	2–3	Portuguesa	São Paulo
19:30 (UTC−3)	Lucas Moura (yellow card) 3'; Calleri 76', 90+1'	Report	Gabriel Pires (yellow card) 45+2'; Renê 50', 83' (pen.), (red card) 90+5'; Eduardo Biazus (yellow card) 64'; Everton Maceió 89'; Hudson (yellow card) 90+2'	Stadium: Morumbi; Attendance: 25,544; Referee: Raphael Claus

24 January 2026 5	Palmeiras	3–1	São Paulo	Barueri
18:30 (UTC−3)	Maurício 8'; Khellven (yellow card) 22', (goal) 51'; López 31'; Bruno Fuchs (yellow card) 57'	Report	Bobadilla 13'; Calleri (yellow card) 88'	Stadium: Arena Barueri; Attendance: 23,842; Referee: Matheus Delgado Candançan

31 January 2026 6	São Paulo	2–0	Santos	São Paulo
20:30 (UTC−3)	Enzo Díaz (yellow card) 18'; Sabino (yellow card) 45+3'; Tapia 51'; Luciano 56'	Report	Miguel Terceros (yellow card) 11'; Gabriel Menino (yellow card) 18' (yellow-red card) 36'; Rony (yellow card) 42'; Escobar (yellow card) 78'	Stadium: Morumbi; Attendance: 49,605; Referee: João Vitor Gobi

7 February 2026 7	São Paulo	2–1	Primavera	São Paulo
20:30 (UTC−3)	Dória (yellow card) 45+4'; Lucas Moura 71'; Calleri 81' (pen.); Ferraresi (yellow card) 85'	Report	Luan Martins (yellow card) 12'; Renato Vischi (yellow card) 44' (yellow-red card) 78'; Gabriel Poveda 54'; Luiz Fernando (yellow card) 90+5'	Stadium: Morumbi; Attendance: 37,267; Referee: Murilo Tarrega Victor

15 February 2026 8	Ponte Preta	1–2	São Paulo	Campinas
20:30 (UTC−3)	Lucas Cunha (yellow card) 45+2'; Bryan 52'; Diego Monteiro (yellow card) 74'	Report	Lucas Ramon 39'; Luciano (yellow card) 45'; Calleri 48'; Enzo Díaz (yellow card) 58'	Stadium: Estádio Moisés Lucarelli; Attendance: 3,677; Referee: Fabiano Monteiro dos Santos

==== Quarter-final ====
21 February 2026 Single match	Red Bull Bragantino	1–2	São Paulo	Bragança Paulista
18:00 (UTC−3)	Lucas Barbosa (yellow card) 36'; Gustavo Marques 72'; Sasha (yellow card) 87'; Sosa (yellow card) 88'; Juninho Capixaba (red card) 90+13'	Report	Bobadilla (yellow card) 19', (goal) 40'; Enzo Díaz (yellow card) 36'; Lucas Moura 52'; Alan Franco (yellow card) 63' (yellow-red card) 90+2'; Pablo Maia (yellow card) 90+6'; Calleri (yellow card) 90+7'	Stadium: Estádio Cícero de Souza Marques; Attendance: 7,019; Referee: Daiane Muniz

==== Semi-final ====
1 March 2026 Single match	Palmeiras	2–1	São Paulo	Barueri
20:30 (UTC−3)	Maurício 8'; Piquerez (yellow card) 51'; José López 58'; Gustavo Gómez (yellow card) 87'	Report	Sabino (yellow card) 56'; Calleri 69' (pen.); Cauly (yellow card) 82'; Marcos Antônio (yellow card) 90+3'	Stadium: Arena Barueri; Attendance: 29,717; Referee: Daiane Muniz

=== Copa Sudamericana ===
The draw for the group stage was held on 19 March 2026, 20:00 PYT (UTC−3), at the CONMEBOL Convention Centre in Luque, Paraguay.

Pos	Team	Pld	W	D	L	GF	GA	GD	Pts	Qualification	SPA	OHI	MIL	BOR
1	(Brazil) São Paulo	6	3	3	0	6	1	+5	12	Advance to round of 16	—	2–0	1–1	2–0
2	(Chile) O'Higgins	6	3	1	2	8	6	+2	10	Advance to knockout round play-offs	0–0	—	2–0	2–0
3	(Colombia) Millonarios	6	2	2	2	7	7	0	8		0–0	1–2	—	1–0
4	(Uruguay) Boston River	6	1	0	5	5	12	−7	3		0–1	3–2	2–4	—

Source: CONMEBOL
Rules for classification: 1) Points; 2) Head-to-head points; 3) Head-to-head goal difference; 4) Head-to-head goals scored; 5) Goal difference; 6) Goals scored; 7) Red cards; 8) Yellow cards; 9) Drawing of lots.

7 April 2026 1	Boston River (Uruguay)	0–1	(Brazil) São Paulo	Montevideo, Uruguay
21:30 UTC−3	Ignacio Fernández (yellow card) 79'	Report	Bobadilla 61'; Rafael (yellow card) 84'	Stadium: Estadio Centenario; Referee: Leandro Rey Hilfer (Argentine)

14 April 2026 2	São Paulo (Brazil)	2–0	(Chile) O'Higgins	São Paulo, Brazil
19:00 UTC−3	Luciano 8', (yellow card) 46'; Calleri (yellow card) 17'; Artur 55'; Bobadilla (yellow card) 66'	Report	Ogaz (yellow card) 16'; Pavez (yellow card) 44'; Leiva (yellow card) 45+1'; Sarrafiore (yellow card) 60'; Vecino (yellow card) 71'	Stadium: Morumbi; Attendance: 19,990; Referee: Darío Herrera (Argentina)

28 April 2026 3	Millonarios (Colombia)	0–0	(Brazil) São Paulo	Bogotá, Colombia
21:30 UTC−3		Report	André Silva (yellow card) 24'; Nicolas Bosshardt (yellow card) 33'; Carlos Coronel (yellow card) 45+2'	Stadium: Estadio El Campín; Referee: Juan Gabriel Benítez (Paraguay)

7 May 2026 4	O'Higgins (Chile)	0–0	(Brazil) São Paulo	Rancagua, Chile
19:00 UTC−3	Brizuela (yellow card) 66'; Garrido (yellow card) 67'; Leiva (yellow card) 75'	Report	Djhordney (yellow card) 26'; Sabino (yellow card) 88'	Stadium: Estadio El Teniente; Referee: Yael Falcón Pérez (Argentina)

19 May 2026 5	São Paulo (Brazil)	1–1	(Colombia) Millonarios	São Paulo, Brazil
21:30 UTC−3	Luciano 9'; Calleri (yellow card) 46'; Ferreira (yellow card) 51'; Artur (yellow card) 72'; Bobadilla (yellow card) 77'	Report	Mosquera (yellow card) 29'; Viveros (yellow card) 58'; Alex Castro (yellow card) 69'; Cabezas Hurtado 81'	Stadium: Morumbi; Attendance: 15,656; Referee: Kevin Ortega (Peru)

26 May 2026 6	São Paulo (Brazil)	2–0	(Uruguay) Boston River	São Paulo, Brazil
19:00 UTC−3	Artur 5'; Acosta 18' (o.g.); Pablo Maia (yellow card) 58'	Report	Gastón Ramírez (yellow card) 58'; Gonzalo Reyna (yellow card) 74'	Stadium: Morumbi; Attendance: 15,056; Referee: Augusto Menéndez (Peru)

==== Round of 16 ====
The draw for the round of 16 was held in 29 May, 12:00 PYST (UTC−3), at the CONMEBOL Convention Centre in Luque, Paraguay.

11 August 2026 First leg	Bolívar (Bolivia)	1–1	(Brazil) São Paulo	La Paz, Bolivia
21:30 UTC−3	Melgar 63'	Report	Arboleda 23'; Iago (yellow card) 50'; Buta (yellow card) 90+6'	Stadium: Hernando Siles; Referee: Wilmar Roldán (Colombia)

18 August 2026 Second leg	São Paulo (Brazil)	3–1 (4–2 agg.)	(Bolivia) Bolívar	São Paulo, Brazil
21:30 UTC−3	Luciano 18', (yellow card) 79'; Danielzinho (yellow card) 27'; Buta (yellow card) 58'; Calleri 68' (pen.); Sabino 76'	Report	Saavedra (yellow card) 15'; Asprilla (yellow card) 27', (goal) 61'; Echeverría (yellow card) 40'; Patito Rodríguez (yellow card) 64'	Stadium: Morumbi; Attendance: 42,087; Referee: Kevin Ortega (Peru)

==== Quarter-finals ====
8 September 2026 First leg	Boca Juniors (Argentina)	1–0	(Brazil) São Paulo	Buenos Aires, Argentina
21:30 UTC−3	Merentiel 52'; Valencia (yellow card) 90+4'	Report	Calleri (yellow card) 70'	Stadium: La Bombonera; Referee: Piero Maza (Chile)

15 September 2026 Second leg	São Paulo (Brazil)	1–1 (1–2 agg.)	(Argentina) Boca Juniors	São Paulo, Brazil
21:30 UTC−3	Djhordney (yellow card) 49'; Domingos Duarte 89'; Artur (yellow card) 90+4'	Report	Lozano 60'; Romero (yellow card) 90+3'	Stadium: Morumbi; Attendance: 55,724; Referee: Gustavo Tejera (Uruguay)

=== Série A ===
==== League table ====
Pos	Team	Pld	W	D	L	GF	GA	GD	Pts	Qualification or relegation
8	Red Bull Bragantino	34	13	8	13	44	39	+5	47	Qualification for Copa Sudamericana group stage
9	Santos	34	12	11	11	50	49	+1	47	Qualification for Copa Sudamericana group stage
10	São Paulo	34	12	8	14	39	39	0	44	Qualification for Copa Sudamericana group stage
11	Vasco da Gama	34	12	8	14	45	50	−5	44	Qualification for Copa Sudamericana group stage
12	Botafogo	34	11	9	14	46	53	−7	42	Qualification for Copa Sudamericana group stage

Updated to match(es) played on 14 November 2026. Source: CBF
Rules for classification: 1) points; 2) wins; 3) goal difference; 4) goals scored; 5) head-to-head results (only between two teams); 6) fewest red cards; 7) fewest yellow cards; 8) drawing of lots.

==== Results summary ====
Overall								Home						Away					
Pld	W	D	L	GF	GA	GD	Pts	W	D	L	GF	GA	GD	W	D	L	GF	GA	GD
34	12	8	14	39	39	0	44	10	4	3	25	13	+12	2	4	11	14	26	−12

Last updated: 4 November 2026.

==== Results by round ====
Round	1	2	3	4	5	6	7	8	9	10	11	12	13	14	15	16	17	18	19	20	21	22	23	24	25	26	27	28	29	30	31	32	33	34	35	36	37	38
Ground	H	A	H	A	H	A	A	H	A	H	A	A	H	H	A	A	H	A	H	A	H	A	H	A	H	H	A	H	A	H	H	A	A	H	H	A	H	A
Result	W	D	W	W	W	W	L	L	D	W	L	L	W	D	L	L	D	L	L	D	L	L	D	L	W	W	L	W	L	W	W	D	L	D				
Position	4	5	2	2	1	1	2	2	4	2	3	4	4	4	4	4	7	8	12	12	10	12	13	13	11	10	11	11	11	10	9	9	10	10				

Postponed

Source: CBF.com

==== Matches ====
The league fixtures was announced on 16 December 2025.

28 January 2026 1	São Paulo	2–1	Flamengo	São Paulo
21:30 UTC−3	Luciano 61'; Danielzinho 71'	Report	Plata 54'; Jorginho (red card) 90+9'	Stadium: Morumbi; Attendance: 27,203; Referee: Wilton Pereira Sampaio

4 February 2026 2	Santos	1–1	São Paulo	Santos
20:00 UTC−3	Frías (yellow card) 18'; Rony (yellow card) 30'; Zé Rafael 45+6', (yellow card) 53'; João Schmidt (yellow card) 71'; Escobar (yellow card) 74'	Report	Alan Franco (yellow card) 37'; Calleri 66'	Stadium: Vila Belmiro; Attendance: 10,280; Referee: Anderson Daronco

11 February 2026 3	São Paulo	2–0	Grêmio	São Paulo
21:30 UTC−3	Lucas 24' (pen.); Luciano (yellow card) 43', (penalty missed) 64'; Pablo Maia (yellow card) 45+5'; Calleri 59'; Ferreira (yellow card) 90+1'	Report	Weverton (yellow card) 23'; Wagner Leonardo (yellow card) 45+5' (yellow-red card) 47'; André Henrique (yellow card) 90+6'	Stadium: Morumbi; Attendance: 18,491; Referee: Sávio Pereira Sampaio

25 February 2026 4	Coritiba	0–1	São Paulo	Curitiba
19:30 UTC−3	Wallisson (yellow card) 36'; Pedro Morisco (yellow card) 55'; Breno Lopes (yellow card) 90+7'; Lavega (yellow card) 90+9'	Report	Djhordney (yellow card) 41'; Cauly 57' (pen.); Alan Franco (yellow card) 64'; Rafael Tolói (yellow card) 90+2'	Stadium: Estádio Couto Pereira; Attendance: 27,675; Referee: Wilton Pereira Sampaio

12 March 2026 5	São Paulo	2–0	Chapecoense	São Paulo
20:00 UTC−3	Luciano 48'; Calleri 61'	Report	Rafael Carvalheira (yellow card) 27'	Stadium: Canindé; Attendance: 13,490; Referee: Lucas Casagrande
Note: The match originally scheduled for Estádio do Morumbi was rescheduled to Canindé, due to the AC/DC Power Up Tour.

15 March 2026 6	Red Bull Bragantino	1–2	São Paulo	Bragança Paulista
20:30 UTC−3	Gabriel (yellow card) 32'; Herrera 37', (yellow card) 41'; Lucas Barbosa (yellow card) 53'; Juninho Capixaba (yellow card) 83'	Report	Calleri (yellow card) 32', (goal) 69'; Sabino 54'; Bobadilla (yellow card) 64'; Luciano (yellow card) 68'; Enzo Díaz (yellow card) 90'	Stadium: Estádio Cícero de Souza Marques; Attendance: 5,400; Referee: Bruno Arleu de Araújo

18 March 2026 7	Atlético Mineiro	1–0	São Paulo	Belo Horizonte
20:00 UTC−3	Román 65', (yellow card) 72'	Report	Enzo Díaz (yellow card) 90+4'	Stadium: Arena MRV; Attendance: 36,830; Referee: Fernando Antônio Mendes de Salles Nascimento Filho

21 March 2026 8	São Paulo	0–1	Palmeiras	São Paulo
21:30 UTC−3	Enzo Díaz (yellow card) 23'; Wendell (yellow card) 84'; André Silva (yellow card) 90+6'	Report	Jhon Arias 6', (yellow card) 90+4'; Andreas Pereira (yellow card) 43'; Carlos Miguel (yellow card) 45+4'; Marlon Freitas (yellow card) 50'; Emiliano Martínez (yellow card) 81'	Stadium: Morumbi; Attendance: 54,058; Referee: Anderson Daronco

1 April 2026 9	Internacional	1–1	São Paulo	Porto Alegre
19:30 UTC−3	Alerrandro 24'; Paulinho (yellow card) 81'	Report	Calleri 81'; Rafael Tolói (yellow card) 90+5'	Stadium: Estádio Beira-Rio; Attendance: 14,780; Referee: Lucas Casagrande

4 April 2026 10	São Paulo	4–1	Cruzeiro	São Paulo
18:30 UTC−3	Calleri 12' (pen.); Ferreira 16', 62', 90+2', (yellow card) 90+2'; Wendell (yellow card) 67'	Report	Christian 47'	Stadium: Morumbi; Attendance: 36,650; Referee: Rodrigo José Pereira de Lima

11 April 2026 11	Vitória	2–0	São Paulo	Salvador
16:30 UTC−3	Cacá 35'; Tarzia (yellow card) 75'; Ramon 83'; Baralhas (yellow card) 88'	Report	Marcos Antônio (yellow card) 37'; Lucas Ramon (red card) 54'; Tetê (yellow card) 76'; Rafael Tolói (yellow card) 89'	Stadium: Barradão; Attendance: 18,102; Referee: Anderson Daronco

18 April 2026 12	Vasco	2–1	São Paulo	Rio de Janeiro
18:30 UTC−3	Puma Rodríguez 72' (pen.); Andrés Gómez 88'; Léo Jardim (yellow card) 90+6'	Report	Luciano 10'; Cédric Soares (yellow card) 58'; Alan Franco (yellow card) 74'	Stadium: Estádio São Januário; Attendance: 20,067; Referee: Sávio Pereira Sampaio

25 April 2026 13	São Paulo	1–0	Mirassol	Campinas
21:00 UTC−3	Danielzinho (yellow card) 41'; Luciano 76'	Report	Nathan Fogaça (yellow card) 44'; José Aldo (yellow card) 45+3'	Stadium: Brinco de Ouro; Attendance: 15,706; Referee: Raphael Claus
Note: The match originally scheduled for Estádio do Morumbi was rescheduled to Estádio Brinco de Ouro, due to the The Weeknd After Hours til Dawn Tour.

3 May 2026 14	São Paulo	2–2	Bahia	Bragança Paulista
16:00 UTC−3	Artur 16'; Bobadilla (yellow card) 44'; Ferreira 72'; Enzo Díaz (yellow card) 80'; Calleri (yellow card) 90+5'	Report	Acevedo (yellow card) 40'; Luciano Juba 61'; Sanabria (yellow card) 90+3'; Erick 90+6', (yellow card) 90+8'	Stadium: Estádio Cícero de Souza Marques; Attendance: 9,390; Referee: Davi de Oliveira Lacerda
Note: The match originally scheduled for Estádio do Morumbi was rescheduled to Estádio Cícero de Souza Marques, due to the The Weeknd After Hours til Dawn Tour.

10 May 2026 15	Corinthians	3–2	São Paulo	São Paulo
18:30 UTC−3	Raniele 17'; Matheus Bidu (yellow card) 45+1'; Gabriel Paulista (yellow card) 45+1'; Matheuzinho 52'; Bidon 57'; Zakaria Labyad (yellow card) 90+4'; Pedro Raul (yellow card) 90+5'	Report	Calleri (yellow card) 45+1'; Sabino (yellow card) 45+1'; Luciano 41'; Enzo Díaz (yellow card) 73'; Matheuzinho 89' (o.g.); Luan (yellow card) 90+4'	Stadium: Neo Química Arena; Attendance: 37,791; Referee: Anderson Daronco

16 May 2026 16	Fluminense	2–1	São Paulo	Rio de Janeiro
20:30 UTC−3	John Kennedy 18'; Canobbio 43'; Bernal (yellow card) 85'; Freytes (yellow card) 90+7'; Savarino (yellow card) 90+7'	Report	André Silva (yellow card) 29'; Artur (yellow card) 66'; Enzo Díaz (yellow card) 75'; Dória 78'; Bobadilla (yellow card) 90'	Stadium: Maracanã; Attendance: 28,218; Referee: Wilton Pereira Sampaio

23 May 2026 17	São Paulo	1–1	Botafogo	São Paulo
17:00 UTC−3	Luciano 4', (yellow card) 27'; Wendell (yellow card) 80'; Rafael (yellow card) 86'; Tapia (yellow card) 89'	Report	Justino (yellow card) 27'; Montoro (yellow card) 61'; Correa (yellow card) 84'; Barrera 90'; Chris Ramos (yellow card) 90+2'	Stadium: Morumbi; Attendance: 25,338; Referee: Lucas Casagrande

31 May 2026 18	Remo	1–0	São Paulo	Belém
20:30 UTC−3	David Braga (yellow card) 85'; Marcelinho 90+4'	Report	Osorio (yellow card) 28'; Enzo Díaz (yellow card) 38'	Stadium: Mangueirão; Attendance: 25,649; Referee: Jonathan Benkenstein Pinheiro

22 July 2026 19	São Paulo	1–2	Athletico Paranaense	Bragança Paulista
21:30 UTC−3	Artur 19'	Report	Arthur Dias (yellow card) 18'; Leozinho 46', 51'	Stadium: Estádio Cícero de Souza Marques; Attendance: 6,487; Referee: Alex Gomes Stefano

26 July 2026 20	Flamengo	1–1	São Paulo	Rio de Janeiro
18:30 UTC−3	Léo Pereira 57'; Alex Sandro (yellow card) 63'	Report	Wendell (yellow card) 69'; Calleri 70', (yellow card) 88'; Marcos Antônio (yellow card) 90+11'	Stadium: Maracanã; Attendance: 70,791; Referee: Anderson Daronco

8 August 2026 22	Grêmio	2–1	São Paulo	Porto Alegre
16:00 UTC−3	Villasanti (yellow card) 45'; Wallace 48'; Caito (yellow card) 81'; Pavón 86'; Marlon (yellow card) 90+2'; Kannemann (yellow card) 90+5'	Report	Gustavo Martins 45+2' (o.g.); Luciano (yellow card) 76'; André Silva (yellow card) 90+2'; Arboleda (yellow card) 90+5'	Stadium: Arena do Grêmio; Attendance: 34,783; Referee: André Luiz Skettino Policarpo Bento

15 August 2026 23	São Paulo	1–1	Coritiba	São Paulo
21:00 UTC−3	Pablo Maia (yellow card) 41', (goal) 43'; Lucas Ramon (yellow card) 68'	Report	Tiago Cóser (yellow card) 5', (goal) 57'	Stadium: Morumbi; Attendance: 44,491; Referee: Charly Wendy Straub Deretti

23 August 2026 24	Chapecoense	1–0	São Paulo	Chapecó
18:30 UTC−3	Bruno Pacheco 26'; Marcinho (yellow card) 62'; Anderson (yellow card) 71'; Yago Felipe (yellow card) 73'; Camilo (yellow card) 88'	Report		Stadium: Arena Condá; Attendance: 12,404; Referee: Rafael Rodrigo Klein

29 August 2026 25	São Paulo	2–1	Red Bull Bragantino	São Paulo
20:00 UTC−3	Luciano 14' (pen.); Gustavo Santana 45+5'; Danielzinho (yellow card) 84'; André Silva (yellow card) 85'; Calleri (yellow card) 90+5'	Report	Pitta (yellow card) 13'; Agustín Sant'Anna (yellow card) 45'; Mosquera (yellow card) 86'; Fernando 90'; Juninho Capixaba (yellow card) 90+5'	Stadium: Morumbi; Attendance: 34,954; Referee: Anderson Daronco

5 September 2026 26	São Paulo	2–0	Atlético Mineiro	São Paulo
18:30 UTC−3	Luciano 67'; Iago 69'; Djhordney (yellow card) 90'	Report	Cuello (yellow card) 90+4'	Stadium: Morumbi; Attendance: 39,068; Referee: Bráulio da Silva Machado

12 September 2026 27	Palmeiras	2–0	São Paulo	São Paulo
18:30 UTC−3	Murilo 45+1', (yellow card) 77'; Gustavo Gómez (yellow card) 45+4'; Giay (yellow card) 45+5'; Vitor Roque 51'; Larson (yellow card) 87'	Report	Pablo Maia (yellow card) 12'; Osorio (red card) 40'	Stadium: Nubank Parque; Attendance: 29,866; Referee: Rafael Rodrigo Klein

19 September 2026 28	São Paulo	1–0	Internacional	São Paulo
21:00 UTC−3	Calleri 15' (pen.), (yellow card) 19'	Report	Matheus Bahia (yellow card) 20'; Bruno Henrique (yellow card) 34'; Mercado (yellow card) 90+2'	Stadium: Morumbi; Attendance: 25,395; Referee: Bruno Arleu de Araújo

2 October 2026 21	São Paulo	1–2	Santos	São Paulo
20:00 UTC−3	Luciano 34' (pen.), (yellow card) 41'	Report	Lucas Veríssimo (yellow card) 33'; Gabriel 36', 54'; Oliva (yellow card) 45'; Everton (yellow card) 76'	Stadium: Morumbi; Attendance: 43,398; Referee: Matheus Delgado Candançan

7 October 2026 29	Cruzeiro	2–0	São Paulo	Belo Horizonte
21:30 UTC−3	Rojas (yellow card) 24'; Kaio Jorge 44'; Zé Lucas 57'; Matheus Pereira (yellow card) 72'	Report	Wendell (yellow card) 21'	Stadium: Mineirão; Attendance: 18,608; Referee: Wilton Pereira Sampaio

10 October 2026 30	São Paulo	2–1	Vitória	São Paulo
20:00 UTC−3	Calleri 20', 70'; Gustavo Santana (yellow card) 24'; Djhordney (yellow card) 44'; Sabino (yellow card) 77'; Iago (yellow card) 78'; Marcos Antônio (yellow card) 90+3'	Report	Matheuzinho (yellow card) 16'; Cacá (yellow card) 17'; Emmanuel Martínez 39'; Renato Kayzer (yellow card) 86'	Stadium: Morumbi; Attendance: 22,618; Referee: Bráulio da Silva Machado

17 October 2026 31	São Paulo	1–0	Vasco	São Paulo
21:00 UTC−3	Artur (yellow card) 42', (goal) 68'; Iago (yellow card) 90+2'	Report	Colidio (yellow card) 44'; Gabriel Pereira (yellow card) 54'	Stadium: Morumbi; Attendance: 31,501; Referee: Fernando Antônio Mendes de Salles Nascimento Filho

24 October 2026 32	Mirassol	1–1	São Paulo	Mirassol
16:30 UTC−3	Neto Moura 7'; Carlos Eduardo (yellow card) 61'; Willian Machado (yellow card) 70'; Wallisson (yellow card) 83'	Report	Djhordney (yellow card) 17'; Iago (yellow card) 26'; Pedro Lima 39'	Stadium: Estádio José Maria de Campos Maia; Attendance: 8,393; Referee: Lucas Casagrande

28 October 2026 33	Bahia	3–2	São Paulo	Salvador
21:30 UTC−3	Rodrigo Nestor 6'; Erick Pulga 10'; Marcos Victor (yellow card) 69', (goal) 81'; David Duarte (yellow card) 90+6'	Report	Lucas Moura 43', (yellow card) 90+2'; Bobadilla 45+5'; Sabino (yellow card) 70'; Gustavo Santana (yellow card) 90'	Stadium: Arena Fonte Nova; Attendance: 21,492; Referee: Anderson Daronco

4 November 2026 34	São Paulo	0–0	Corinthians	Santos
21:30 UTC−3	Djhordney (yellow card) 31'; Pedro Lima (yellow card) 60'; Newton (yellow card) 61'; Luciano (yellow card) 67'; Pedro Ferreira (yellow card) 89'	Report	Matheus Pereira (red card) 31'; André Ramalho (yellow card) 45'; Milans (yellow card) 52'; Depay (yellow card) 67'; Yuri Alberto (red card) 82'	Stadium: Vila Belmiro; Attendance: 12,786; Referee: Raphael Claus
Note: The match originally scheduled for Estádio do Morumbi was rescheduled to Vila Belmiro, due to the BTS Arirang World Tour.

19 November 2026 35	São Paulo	v	Fluminense	São Paulo
21:30 UTC−3		Report		Stadium: Morumbi

23 November 2026 36	Botafogo	v	São Paulo	Rio de Janeiro
20:00 UTC−3		Report		Stadium: Estádio Nilton Santos

28–29 November 2026 37	São Paulo	v	Remo	São Paulo
--:-- UTC−3		Report		Stadium: Morumbi

2 December 2026 38	Athletico Paranaense	v	São Paulo	Curitiba
--:-- UTC−3		Report		Stadium: Arena da Baixada

=== Copa do Brasil ===
==== Fifth round ====
21 April 2026 First leg	São Paulo	1–0	Juventude	São Paulo
19:15 UTC−3	Luciano 32'; Calleri (penalty missed) 90+1'	Report	Rodrigo Sam (yellow card) 29'; Diogo Barbosa (red card) 50'; Luan Martins (yellow card) 69'; Mandaca (yellow card) 71'	Stadium: Morumbi; Attendance: 33,603; Referee: Lucas Paulo Torezin

13 May 2026 Second leg	Juventude	3–1 (3–2 agg.)	São Paulo	Caxias do Sul
19:00 UTC−3	Rodrigo Sam (yellow card) 38'; Gabriel Pinheiro (yellow card) 56', (goal) 65'; Marcos Paulo 72'; Mandaca 90+4'	Report	Ferreira (red card) 44'; Enzo Díaz (yellow card) 54'; Tapia 84'	Stadium: Alfredo Jaconi; Attendance: 6,007; Referee: Rodrigo José Pereira de Lima
