= São Paulo FC (youth) =

São Paulo FC Youth Squads
- Full name: São Paulo Futebol Clube
- Ground: CFA Cotia
- Capacity: 1500
- President: Harry Massis Jr.
- Head Coach: Julio Baptista (U20); Mário Ramalho (U17)
- League: Campeonato Brasileiro Sub-20 (U-20)
- 2017: -
- Website: saopaulofc.net/equipe/formacao-de-atletas/temporada
Home colours	Away colours	Third colours

The São Paulo FC Youth Squads (Brazilian Portuguese: Categorias de Base) are the youth academy of São Paulo FC, a Brazilian football club based in São Paulo. The youth sector is composed of various squads divided by age groups. All the youth teams currently train at the club's main training ground, CFA Cotia, located in the municipality of Cotia. The U-20 squad currently plays in the Campeonato Brasileiro Sub-20, the Copa do Brasil Sub-20 and the Copa São Paulo de Futebol Júnior. São Paulo FC's Youth Squads of all categories have won trophies at national and international level.

== Honours ==
=== Continental ===
- U-20 Copa Libertadores
  - Winners (1): 2016

=== National ===
- Campeonato Brasileiro Sub-23
  - Winners (1): 2020
- Copa do Brasil Sub-20
  - Winners (4): 2015, 2016, 2018, 2024
- Supercopa do Brasil Sub-20
  - Winners (1): 2018
- Copa do Brasil Sub-17
  - Winners (2): 2013, 2020
- Supercopa do Brasil Sub-17
  - Winners (1): 2020
- Copa do Brasil Sub-15
  - Winners (1): 2008
- Copa Votorantim Sub-15
  - Winners (6): 1991, 1992, 2013, 2014, 2016, 2024

=== Inter-state ===
- Copa São Paulo de Futebol Júnior
  - Winners (5): 1993, 2000, 2010, 2019, 2025
- Taça Belo Horizonte de Juniores
  - Winners (4): 1987, 1997, 2016, 2017
- Copa Rio Grande do Sul de Futebol Sub-20
  - Winners (3): 2015, 2016, 2017
- Copa 2 de Julho
  - Winners (1): 2011
- Salvador Cup
  - Winners (2): 2016, 2017

=== State ===
- Campeonato Paulista Sub-20
  - Winners (10): 1954, 1955, 1956, 1958, 1987, 1995, 1999, 2000, 2011, 2016
- Campeonato Paulista Sub-17
  - Winners (21): 1942, 1946, 1954, 1954, 1955, 1956, 1964, 1969, 1970, 1973, 1976, 1979, 1982, 1990, 1991, 1991, 1995, 2006, 2015, 2016, 2019
- Campeonato Paulista Sub-15
  - Winners (16): 1955, 1963, 1973, 1976, 1978, 1984, 1989, 1990, 1992, 1995, 1997, 1999, 2007, 2008, 2014, 2018
- Campeonato Paulista Sub-13
  - Winners (1): 2019
- Campeonato Paulista Sub-11
  - Winners (1): 2018

== Copa São Paulo de Futebol Júnior winners ==
Below is the list of champion players in the main youth competition in Brazilian football, the Copa São Paulo de Futebol Jr..

=== 1993 ===
Goalkeepers
- Rogério Ceni
- Wellington Berto

Defenders
- Pavão
- Sérgio Baresi
- Nelson
- André Luiz
- Erick Marson
- Lino

Midfielders
- Mona
- Emerson Pereira
- Robertinho
- Rubens Caldeira
- Douglas Mizuno

Forwards
- Jamelli
- Caio
- Toninho
- Catê

Head coach
- Márcio Araújo

=== 2000 ===
Goalkeepers
- Allan
- Márcio
- Caio Rizzato

Defenders
- Gabriel
- Jean
- Hilton
- Alemão
- Júlio Santos
- Andrey Mayr
- Xandão
- Rodrigão

Midfielders
- Fábio Simplício
- Júlio Baptista
- Harison
- Montezine
- Daniel Rossi
- Edu
- Kaká
- Pepe
- Robson Moura

Forwards
- Oliveira
- Renatinho
- Leandro Alves
- Wílton Batata
- Márcio Luiz
- Dinei

Head coach
- Pita

=== 2010 ===
Goalkeepers
- Richard
- Leonardo

Defenders
- Filipe Aguaí
- Bruno Uvini
- Maurício
- Lucas Mendes
- Fabiano
- Felipe Emanuel
- Luiz Paulo

Midfielders
- Casemiro
- Zé Vitor
- Jeferson
- Lucas Moura ("Marcelinho")
- Rodrigo Caio
- Dener
- Willian Arão
- Paulo Henrique
- Régis
- João Schmidt
- Marcel

Forwards
- Ronieli
- Lucas Gaúcho
- Alfredo
- Patrick
- Bruno Anjos

Head coach
- Sérgio Baresi

=== 2019 ===
Goakeepers
- Thiago Couto
- Arthur Gazze
- Eduardo Jaroszuk

Defenders
- Caio
- Tuta
- Welington
- Morato
- Weverson
- Lucas Fasson
- Lucas Sena

Midfielders
- Diego Costa
- Rodrigo Nestor
- Gabriel Sara
- Cássio
- Rafael Silva
- Danilo Gomes
- Marcos Júnior
- Thiaguinho
- Thiago Gonçalves

Forwards
- Antony
- Gabriel Novaes
- Fabinho
- Ed Carlos
- Vitinho
- Paulinho

Head coach
- Orlando Ribeiro

=== 2025 ===
Goalkeepers
- João Pedro
- João Paulo
- Luciano

Defenders
- Igão
- Maik
- Andrade
- Lucas Loss
- Guilherme Reis
- Igor Felisberto
- Raphael Gogoni
- Kauê
- Luis Osorio
- Hugo Martins
- Felipe
- Marques Rickelme

Midfielders
- Felipe Negrucci
- Hugo Leonardo
- Matheus Alves
- Lucas Ferreira
- Guilherme Fumaça
- Bezerra
- Samuel Santos
- Pedro Ferreira
- Luiz Henrique

Forwards
- Ryan Francisco
- Henrique Carmo
- Paulinho
- Lucca Marques
- Tetê
- Gustavo Miranda

Head coach
- Allan Barcellos

== See also ==
- São Paulo FC
