= Pedro Ferreira (footballer, born 2007) =

Brazilian footballer

Personal information
- Full name: Pedro Henrique Ferreira da Silva
- Date of birth: 24 April 2007 (age 19)
- Place of birth: Diadema, Brazil
- Height: 1.75 m (5 ft 9 in)
- Position: Attacking midfielder

Team information
- Current team: São Paulo
- Number: 46

Youth career
- Palestra de São Bernardo
- 2018–: São Paulo

Senior career*
Years	Team	Apps	(Gls)
2025–	São Paulo	10	(0)

International career
2026–	Brazil U20	4	(0)
- * Club domestic league appearances and goals as of 23:04, 10 October 2026 (UTC)

Pedro Henrique Ferreira da Silva (born 24 April 2007), known as Pedro Ferreira, is a Brazilian professional footballer who plays as an attacking midfielder for Campeonato Brasileiro Série A club São Paulo.

== Career ==
Ferreira joined São Paulo's youth sides in 2018, aged 11. On 7 June 2025, after already establishing himself as a starter in the under-20 team, he renewed his contract until May 2029.

Ferreira made his first team – and Série A – debut on 3 December 2025, coming on as a late substitute for Luciano in a 3–0 home win over Internacional.

== Career statistics ==
As of 10 October 2026

Appearances and goals by club, season and competition
Club	Season	League			State League		Cup		Continental		Other		Total	
Club	Season	Division	Apps	Goals	Apps	Goals	Apps	Goals	Apps	Goals	Apps	Goals	Apps	Goals
São Paulo	2025	Série A	2	0	—		—		—		—		2	0
São Paulo	2026	Série A	5	0	3	0	—		2 (Note: Appearances in Copa Sudamericana)	0	—		10	0
Career total			7	0	3	0	0	0	2	0	0	0	12	0

== Honours ==
São Paulo U20

- Copa do Brasil Sub-20: 2024, 2025
- Copa São Paulo de Futebol Júnior: 2025
