= Tetê (footballer, born 2007) =

Brazilian footballer

Personal information
- Full name: Perivan dos Santos
- Date of birth: 14 April 2007 (age 19)
- Place of birth: São Paulo, Brazil
- Height: 1.72 m (5 ft 8 in)
- Position: Forward

Team information
- Current team: São Paulo
- Number: 34

Youth career
- 2018–: São Paulo

Senior career*
Years	Team	Apps	(Gls)
2026–	São Paulo	1	(0)
- * Club domestic league appearances and goals as of 17:07, 2 April 2026 (UTC)

Perivan dos Santos (born 14 April 2007), commonly known as Tetê, is a Brazilian professional footballer who plays as a forward for Campeonato Brasileiro Série A club São Paulo.

== Career ==
Born in São Paulo, Tetê joined São Paulo's youth sides in 2018, aged 11. On 30 October 2025, after establishing himself in the under-20 team, he renewed his contract until 2029.

Tetê made his first team – and Série A – debut on 1 April 2026, coming on as a late substitute for Artur in a 1–1 away draw against Internacional.

== Career statistics ==
As of 2 April 2026

Club	Season	League			State League		Cup		Continental		Other		Total	
Club	Season	Division	Apps	Goals	Apps	Goals	Apps	Goals	Apps	Goals	Apps	Goals	Apps	Goals
São Paulo	2026	Série A	1	0	—		0	0	0	0	—		1	0
Career total			1	0	0	0	0	0	0	0	0	0	1	0

== Honours ==
São Paulo U20

- Copa do Brasil Sub-20: 2025
- Copa São Paulo de Futebol Júnior: 2025
