= Igão =

Brazilian footballer

Personal information
- Full name: Igor Odoni Gomes
- Date of birth: 19 August 2007 (age 19)
- Place of birth: São Paulo, Brazil
- Height: 1.87 m (6 ft 2 in)
- Position: Centre-back

Team information
- Current team: São Paulo
- Number: 34

Youth career
- 2016–: São Paulo

Senior career*
Years	Team	Apps	(Gls)
2024–	São Paulo	1	(0)

International career
2024–	Brazil U17	1	(0)
- * Club domestic league appearances and goals as of 8 December 2024

Igor Odoni Gomes (born 19 August 2007), simply known as Igor Odoni or by the nickname Igão, is a Brazilian professional footballer who plays as a centre-back for Campeonato Brasileiro Série A club São Paulo.

== Career ==
In the youth categories of São Paulo FC since he was 10 years old, Igão gained notoriety for his great leadership profile, distinct among boys of his age. With an intense and physical game, he ended up being promoted to the professional squad at just 16 years old by coach Luis Zubeldía, in June 2024. Due to his rise, Igão was called up to defend the Brazil under-17 team in the Cascais Luso Cup, in July 2024.

Igão made his professional debut on 8 December 2024, when he entered the final four minutes of the match against Botafogo, in the 38th round of the 2024 Campeonato Brasileiro Série A. Initially signed up to compete in the Copa São Paulo de Futebol Jr., he was selected on 9 January 2025 for the club's pre-season in Florida, United States.

== Honours ==
São Paulo U20

- Copa São Paulo de Futebol Jr.: 2025
- Copa do Brasil Sub-20: 2025

Brazil U17

- Cascais Luso Cup: 2024
