= Paulinho (footballer, born 17 May 2005) =

Brazilian footballer (born 2005)

Personal information
- Full name: Paulo Sérgio Venuto Bezerra
- Date of birth: 17 May 2005 (age 21)
- Place of birth: Piranhas, Alagoas, Brazil
- Height: 1.78 m (5 ft 10 in)
- Position: Forward

Team information
- Current team: Torreense (on loan from São Paulo)

Youth career
- 2018–2026: São Paulo

Senior career*
Years	Team	Apps	(Gls)
2025–	São Paulo	3	(0)
2026–	→ Torreense (loan)	0	(0)
- * Club domestic league appearances and goals as of 1 September 2026

Paulo Sérgio Venuto Bezerra (born 17 May 2005), better known as Paulinho, is a Brazilian professional footballer who plays as forward for Liga Portugal 2 club Torreense, on loan from São Paulo.

== Career ==
At São Paulo since the age of 12, Paulinho completed his entire youth development at the club. He gained particular notoriety in 2024, when he scored 28 goals for the under-20s, and in the 2025 Copa São Paulo, scoring twice in the final against Corinthians.

On 25 May 2025, Paulinho had his contract renewed until 2029, alongside Maik and Igor Felisberto. Paulinho made his professional debut as a substitute of Luciano, in the match against Juventude for the 35th round of 2025 Campeonato Brasileiro Série A.

In 2026, he was the top scorer of the Copa São Paulo de Futebol Júnior but suffered a knee injury in the final match against Cruzeiro, losing his spot in the professional squad. No longer eligible for the U-20 team, a loan to Botafogo-SP was initially reported in July. After the both clubs failed to reach an mutual agreement, Paulinho was loaned to Torreense on 31 August.

== Honours ==
São Paulo U20

- Copa São Paulo de Futebol Jr.: 2025
- Copa do Brasil Sub-20: 2024, 2025
- Dallas Cup U19: 2024
