= Allan Barcellos =

Brazilian footballer

Personal information
- Full name: Allan Barcellos Silveira
- Date of birth: 29 July 1992 (age 34)
- Place of birth: Porto Alegre, Brazil

Team information
- Current team: Palmeiras U20 (head coach)

Managerial career
- Years: Team
- 2013–2015: Grêmio U9
- 2016: Grêmio U10
- 2017–2018: Grêmio U11
- 2018–2019: Grêmio U12
- 2019–2021: Grêmio U13
- 2022: São Paulo U13
- 2023: São Paulo U15
- 2023–2024: São Paulo U17
- 2024–2026: São Paulo U20
- 2026–: Palmeiras U20

Allan Barcellos Silveira (born 27 July 1992), is a Brazilian football coach, currently the head coach of Palmeiras' under-20 team.

== Career ==
Graduated in physical education from PUC-RS, Barcellos began his career as a coach in the youth categories of Grêmio, where he worked from 2013 to 2021.

Barcellos arrived at São Paulo in 2022, to command the under-13 team. He progressed through the club's youth sides, before being appointed head coach of the under-20 squad on 24 May 2024. He stood out for the great reaction obtained in the Campeonato Brasileiro Sub-20, and also won the Copa do Brasil Sub-20 in December of that year.

In January 2025, Barcellos led the under-20s of Tricolor to the main youth category title in Brazilian football, the Copa São Paulo de Futebol Júnior. He reached the Campeonato Paulista Sub-20 finals for the second consecutive year, again losing the trophy, before asking to leave the club in March 2026, after not being able to move to the first team.

On 6 April 2026, Palmeiras announced the signing of Barcellos as their under-20 head coach.

== Honours ==
São Paulo U20

- Copa São Paulo de Futebol Júnior: 2025
- Copa do Brasil Sub-20: 2024, 2025
