= High Noon (2013 film) =

- Film poster
- Spanish: La Hora Señalada
- Directed by: Ivan Mazza
- Written by: Ivan Mazza
- Produced by: Mike Medina
- Starring: Gabriel Rojas; Pedro Gómez; Prakriti Maduro; Edgar Noria; Efraín Romero; Gustavo Santana
- Cinematography: Carlos Luis Rodríguez
- Edited by: Miguel Angel García
- Music by: Juan Carlos Redondo
- Release date: March 2, 2013 (Cinequest)
- Running time: 14 minutes
- Country: Venezuela
- Language: Spanish

High Noon (Original Spanish title: La Hora Señalada) is a 2013 Venezuelan drama short film about bullying, directed by Ivan Mazza.

== Plot ==
In a school playground, a small and lonely child, is walking by the group of popular kids in his class when someone pushes him accidentally against the biggest boy of the group, making him drop a pack of gum in the wet and dirty floor. The boys around them decide they should fight, so it is decreed the two of them must face each other outside the school, when the noon bell rings. When the classes end, the small kid will try to escape the situation by lingering in the empty building and trying to go unnoticed. However, the ticking clock will become Figueroa's worst enemy, and he has to face his fears and insecurities in order to confront his enemy outside the school at high noon.

== Cast ==
- Gabriel Rojas ... Figueroa
- Pedro Gómez ... Almendros
- Prakriti Maduro ... Teacher
- Efraín Romero ... Dark haired teaser
- Edgar Noria ... Menacing teaser
- Gustavo Santana ... Blonde teaser

== Production ==
High Noon is an independently financed short film, produced by Mike Medina and coproduced by CNAC. The second short film from its director, after the award-winning short film Yours from 2010. High Noon was filmed during five days in various locations over the city of Caracas, in April 2012. The project was awarded funding by Venezuela's CNAC in 2011. Editing and sound post production took place in Caracas for a period of one month after filming ended. It was premiered in March 2013 during the 23rd Cinequest Film Festival as part of the Official Short Film Competition. After this, it was selected in various prestigious Film Festivals around the world during 2013 as part of their respective Official Selections, being described by the press as a poignant film where moments of inner struggle are captured and also as a Spaghetti Western from the schoolyard.

The film was screened in half of the commercial venues in Venezuela during January and February 2015 as part of the Venezuela en corto initiative to promote award-winning Venezuelan short films to general audiences. The plot is inspired in the director's recollections from a similar situation he lived in his childhood. He also treated the story as an homage to the Western as a film genre

== Awards ==
- 10th FENACO International Short Film Festival 2013
  - Best Short Film for children (Winner)
- 3rd Venezuelan FESCIVE Film Festival 2013
  - Best Short Film
  - Best Director
  - Best Actor (tie Gabriel Rojas & Pedro Gómez)
- 3rd Children & Youth International Film Festival (FICAIJ) 2013
  - Best Short Fiction for Children
- Caracas Municipal Cinema Award 2013
  - Best Screenplay for a Short Film

== Official selections ==
- 23rd Cinequest Film Festival 2013
  - Best Short Film (Nominated)
- 37th Cleveland International Film Festival 2013
  - Best Short Film (Nominated)
- 16th 2013 Toronto International Film Festival#TIFF Kids 2013
  - Best Short Film (Nominated)
- 29th Chicago Latino Film Festival 2013
  - Best Short Film (Nominated)
- 17th Rhode Island International Film Festival 2013
  - Best Short Film (Nominated)
- 17th Urbanworld Film Festival 2013
  - Best Short Narrative (Nominated)
- 22nd Heartland Film Festival 2013
  - Best Short Film (Nominated)
- 15th Tokyo Short Shorts Film Festival 2013
  - Best Short Film (Nominated)
- 29th Warsaw International Film Festival 2013
  - Best Short Film (Nominated)
- 11th Shnit international shortfilmfestival 2013
  - Best Short Film (Nominated)
- 23rd Tromsø International Film Festival 2013
  - Best Short Film (Nominated)
- 31st Uruguay International Film Festival 2013
  - Best Short Film (Nominated)
- 16th Expresión en Corto International Film Festival 2013
  - Best Short Film (Nominated)
- 35th Havana Film Festival 2013
  - Best Short Film (Nominated)
- 6th Gulf International Film Festival 2013
  - Best Short Film (Nominated)
- 53rd Cartagena Film Festival 2013
