= Djhordney =

Brazilian footballer

Personal information
- Full name: Djhordney Ferreira
- Date of birth: 17 June 2007 (age 19)
- Place of birth: Campo Grande, Brazil
- Height: 1.81 m (5 ft 11 in)
- Position: Midfielder

Team information
- Current team: São Paulo
- Number: 48

Youth career
- 2022–2026: Novorizontino
- 2024: → Palmeiras (loan)
- 2025–2026: → São Paulo (loan)
- 2026–: São Paulo

Senior career*
| Years | Team | Apps | (Gls) |
| 2026– | São Paulo | 1 | (0) |

International career
| 2026– | Brazil U20 | 3 | (0) |
- * Club domestic league appearances and goals as of 25 February 2026

Djhordney Ferreira (born 17 June 2007), simply known as Djhordney, is a Brazilian professional footballer who plays as a midfielder for Campeonato Brasileiro Série A club São Paulo.

== Career ==
Born in Campo Grande, Djhordney began his career with Novorizontino playing for the under-15 category in 2022. In 2024 he was loaned to SE Palmeiras in the under-17 category, and in 2025 to São Paulo, already in the under-20 category, where he was one of the players with most appearances in the season, winning the U20 Copa do Brasil. In 2026 he was permanently acquired by São Paulo for R$ 1 million. On 25 February he made his professional debut, starting in a 1–0 away win over Coritiba.

== Honours ==
São Paulo U20

- Copa do Brasil Sub-20: 2025
