= Lucas Mendes =

Lucas Mendes may refer to:

- Lucas Mendes (American soccer) (born 1997), American soccer player
- Lucas Mendes (footballer, born 1990), Brazilian-born Qatari footballer
- Lucas Pereira Mendes (born 1991), Brazilian footballer
- Lucas Mendes (footballer, born 1992), Brazilian footballer
- Lucas Mendes (journalist) (born 1944), Brazilian journalist
