= Iba Ly =

Senegalese footballer

Personal information
- Date of birth: 22 January 2003 (age 23)
- Place of birth: Dakar, Senegal
- Height: 1.75 m (5 ft 9 in)
- Position: Defensive midfielder

Team information
- Current team: Juventude (on loan from São Paulo)
- Number: 26

Youth career
- 2022: Brasilis
- 2023–2024: São Paulo

Senior career*
Years	Team	Apps	(Gls)
2024–	São Paulo	0	(0)
2024–2025	→ Inter de Limeira (loan)	10	(0)
2025	→ Retrô (loan)	13	(0)
2026–	→ Juventude (loan)	12	(0)
- * Club domestic league appearances and goals as of 16 November 2026

Iba Ly (born 22 January 2003) is a Senegalese professional footballer who plays as a defensive midfielder for Brazilian club Juventude, on loan from São Paulo.

== Career ==
Born in Dakar, Ly is part of former football player Oscar Bernardi's project, which aims to bring talents from African countries to Brazil. He was initially taken to Brasilis FC in 2022, and in 2023 he was taken to São Paulo FC. In 2024, he was the team's highlight in the Copa São Paulo de Futebol Júnior, being promoted by then head coach Thiago Carpini to the main squad in the 2024 Campeonato Paulista dispute. On 12 March 2024, Iba Ly had his contract renewed until the end of 2027.

Without entering, Ly was loaned on 25 July 2024 to Inter de Limeira until the end of the 2025 Campeonato Paulista. Ly made his professional debut in the 2024 Campeonato Brasileiro Série D, in a match against Avenida, valid for the Round of 32 stage. Ly took and converted one of the penalties during the shoot-out that defined Inter de Limeira's classification.

On 25 February 2025, after the end of Inter de Limeira's participation in the Campeonato Paulista, his return was requested by São Paulo. The following day, his loan to Retrô until the end of the season was announced. After making 18 appearances for Retrô, Athletico Paranaense showed interest in loaning Ly, but the proposal was rejected by São Paulo.

For the 2026 season, Iba Ly was loaned to Juventude.

== Personal life ==
Ly is Muslim, being the first footballer of the religion to play for São Paulo. In March 2024, he gained media attention by carrying out a personalized training system during Ramadan.
