= Hugo Leonardo =

Brazilian footballer

Personal information
- Full name: Hugo Leonardo Nunes Fernandes Santos
- Date of birth: 19 January 2004 (age 22)
- Place of birth: São Paulo, Brazil
- Height: 1.75 m (5 ft 9 in)
- Position: Midfielder

Team information
- Current team: Mito HollyHock (on loan from São Paulo)

Youth career
- 2016–2021: Santos
- 2022–2024: Ska Brasil
- 2024: → São Paulo (loan)
- 2025: São Paulo

Senior career*
Years	Team	Apps	(Gls)
2024	Ska Brasil	5	(0)
2025–	São Paulo	2	(0)
2026–	→ Mito HollyHock (loan)	0	(0)
- * Club domestic league appearances and goals as of 1 September 2026

Hugo Leonardo Nunes Fernandes Santos (born 19 January 2004), better known as Hugo or Hugo Leonardo, is a Brazilian professional footballer who plays as a midfielder for J.League club Mito HollyHock, on loan from São Paulo.

== Career ==
=== Youth ===
Having started his career in the youth sector at Santos FC, Hugo gained prominence when playing for Ska Brasil in 2022 in the under-17 category. In May 2024 he was signed on loan by São Paulo FC, being part of the victorious campaign of the 2024 Copa do Brasil U20. In his last eligible tournament for the youth sectors, Hugo became champion of the 2025 Copa São Paulo.

=== Senior ===
His first professional experience was with Ska Brasil in the Campeonato Paulista Série A4. After the performance in the under-20 category for São Paulo, Hugo caught the attention of coach Luis Zubeldía, who asked for his permanent signing. On 10 December 2024, São Paulo acquired his federative rights from Ska Brasil for R$ 400,000. On 14 January 2025, the athlete was registered on São Paulo FC's A list to compete in the 2025 Campeonato Paulista.

Hugo made his professional debut for São Paulo FC against Botafogo-SP, on 20 January 2025. During the final match of the Copa SP against Corinthians, Hugo Leonardo suffered an injury to the anterior cruciate ligament of his right knee, with recovery scheduled for a period of eight months.

On 27 August 2026, his loan to J.League club Mito HollyHock was finalized, running until the end of the year.

== Style of play ==
Initially a central midfielder, Hugo changed his position upon arriving at São Paulo FC, playing in more defensive roles.

== Honours ==
São Paulo U20

- Copa São Paulo de Futebol Jr.: 2025
- Copa do Brasil Sub-20: 2024
