= Maik (footballer, born 2005) =

Brazilian footballer (born 2005)

Personal information
- Full name: Maik Gomes Viegas
- Date of birth: 3 January 2005 (age 21)
- Place of birth: São Paulo, Brazil
- Height: 1.75 m (5 ft 9 in)
- Position: Right-back

Team information
- Current team: Banská Bystrica (on loan from São Paulo)
- Number: 42

Youth career
- 2015–2025: São Paulo

Senior career*
| Years | Team | Apps | (Gls) |
| 2025– | São Paulo | 18 | (2) |
| 2026– | → Banská Bystrica (loan) | 3 | (0) |

International career
| 2022 | Brazil U17 | | |
- * Club domestic league appearances and goals as of 21 September 2026

Maik Gomes Viegas (born 3 January 2005), simply known as Maik, is a Brazilian professional footballer who plays as right-back for Slovak club Banská Bystrica, on loan from São Paulo..

== Career ==
Maik arrived at São Paulo in the under-11 category in 2015, carrying out his entire development process in the club's youth sectors. With contract renewed in August 2024, he gained notoriety in the following months, when he stood out as the starting right-back of the champion teams of the Copa do Brasil U20 and Copa São Paulo de Futebol Jr.

After joining the professional team as a substitute during the 2025 Campeonato Paulista, he returned to the U20 team, to compete in the Brazilian championship in the category. On 31 July 2025 he made his professional debut, in a 2–1 victory against Athletico Paranaense, in the 2025 Copa do Brasil. The debut took place days after the coach of São Paulo's under-20 team, Allan Barcellos, stated that the player was now fully ready for the challenge.

On 7 September 2026, a loan deal for Maik with MFK Dukla Banská Bystrica was agreed upon until June 2027.

== Honours ==
São Paulo U20

- Copa São Paulo de Futebol Jr.: 2025
- Copa do Brasil Sub-20: 2024
