= Cauã Lucca =

Brazilian footballer

Personal information
- Full name: Cauã Lucca Silvério Ribeiro
- Date of birth: 27 May 2004 (age 22)
- Place of birth: São Paulo, Brazil
- Height: 1.68 m (5 ft 6 in)
- Position: Midfielder

Team information
- Current team: Luverdense (on loan from São Paulo)

Youth career
- 2015: Portuguesa
- 2016–2024: São Paulo

Senior career*
Years	Team	Apps	(Gls)
2025–	São Paulo	0	(0)
2025	→ Boavista-RJ (loan)	5	(0)
2026	→ Manaus (loan)	12	(2)
2026–	→ Luverdense (loan)	0	(0)
- * Club domestic league appearances and goals as of 6 July 2026

Cauã Lucca Silvério Ribeiro (born 27 May 2004), also known as Cauã Lucca or Roquinho, is a Brazilian professional footballer who plays as a midfielder for Luverdense, on loan from São Paulo.

== Career ==
Originally a midfielder, Cauã Lucca played primarily in the youth ranks of São Paulo FC, where he won the Dallas Cup and the U20 Copa do Brasil in 2024. After not being promoted to the professional team, he was loaned to Boavista-RJ for the 2025 Campeonato Brasileiro Série D dispute, and to Manaus FC for the 2026 season. After Manaus FC was eliminated from Série D, he signed with Luverdense EC for the remainder of the year.

== Personal life ==
Cauã Lucca is son of the former footballer Roque, which earned him the nickname "Roquinho" in the early years of his youth career.

== Honours ==
São Paulo U20

- Copa do Brasil Sub-20: 2024
- Dallas Cup U19: 2024
