= Newton (footballer, born 2000) =

Brazilian footballer

Personal information
- Full name: Newton Araújo da Costa Júnior
- Date of birth: 12 March 2000 (age 26)
- Place of birth: Salvador, Brazil
- Height: 1.88 m (6 ft 2 in)
- Position: Defensive midfielder

Team information
- Current team: São Paulo
- Number: 28

Youth career
- 2018–2021: Jacuipense

Senior career*
Years	Team	Apps	(Gls)
2019–2023	Jacuipense	28	(3)
2021	→ Bahia de Feira (loan)	2	(0)
2022–2023	→ Botafogo (loan)	1	(0)
2024–2026	Botafogo	56	(1)
2024	→ Criciúma (loan)	30	(1)
2026–	São Paulo	0	(0)
- * Club domestic league appearances and goals as of 18:58, 16 July 2026 (UTC)

Newton Araújo da Costa Júnior (born 12 March 2000), simply known as Newton, is a Brazilian professional footballer who plays as a defensive midfielder for Campeonato Brasileiro Série A club São Paulo.

== Career ==
Born in Salvador, Bahia, Newton joined Jacuipense's youth categories in 2018. He made his senior debut with the club on 19 January 2019, coming on as a half-time substitute in a 2–1 Campeonato Baiano away loss to Bahia de Feira, before returning to the under-20s.

Definitely promoted to the main squad in February 2021, Newton featured rarely before moving to Bahia de Feira in the Série D on loan on 4 June of that year. Upon returning, he became a regular starter for Jacupa, scoring his first senior goal on 22 May 2022 in a 1–1 away draw against ASA.

On 8 August 2022, Newton signed for Botafogo and was initially assigned to the under-23 team. He made his Série A debut on 3 December 2023, coming on as a late substitute for Gabriel Pires in a 0–0 home draw against Cruzeiro.

On 31 December 2023, Botafogo exercised Newton's buyout clause, with the player signing a four-year contract. The following 17 April, after being rarely used, he was loaned to fellow top tier side Criciúma until December.

Upon returning to Fogão in January 2025, Newton impressed and renewed his link until December 2028 on 4 February. Mainly a backup under head coach Renato Paiva, he finished the year being regularly used by Davide Ancelotti.

On 15 July 2026, Newton signed a three-and-a-half-year contract with São Paulo.

== Career statistics ==
As of 16 July 2026.

Club	Season	League			State League		Cup		Continental		Other		Total	
Club	Season	Division	Apps	Goals	Apps	Goals	Apps	Goals	Apps	Goals	Apps	Goals	Apps	Goals
Jacuipense	2019	Série D	0	0	2	0	—		—		—		2	0
Jacuipense	2020	Série C	2	0	0	0	—		—		—		2	0
Jacuipense	2021	Série C	0	0	2	0	—		—		—		2	0
Jacuipense	2022	Série D	15	3	7	0	—		—		0	0	22	3
Jacuipense	Total		17	3	11	0	—		—		0	0	28	3
Bahia de Feira (loan)	2021	Série D	2	0	—		—		—		—		2	0
Botafogo	2023	Série A	1	0	0	0	0	0	—		—		1	0
Botafogo	2024	Série A	0	0	9	0	0	0	0	0	—		9	0
Botafogo	2025	Série A	25	1	10	0	5	0	1 (Note: Appearance(s) in Copa Libertadores)	0	5 (Note: Two appearances in Recopa Sudamericana, three appearances in FIFA Club World Cup)	0	46	1
Botafogo	2026	Série A	7	0	5	0	0	0	6 (Note: Four appearances in Copa Libertadores, two appearances and one goal in Copa Sudamericana)	1	—		18	1
Botafogo	Total		33	1	24	0	5	0	7	1	5	0	74	2
Criciúma (loan)	2024	Série A	30	1	—		1	0	—		—		31	1
São Paulo	2026	Série A	0	0	—		—		0	0	—		0	0
Career total			82	5	35	0	6	0	7	1	5	0	135	6
