= Nicolas Bosshardt =

Brazilian footballer (born 2008)

Personal information
- Full name: Nicolas Bosshardt
- Date of birth: 8 April 2007 (age 19)
- Place of birth: São Paulo, Brazil
- Height: 1.76 m (5 ft 9 in)
- Position: Left-back

Team information
- Current team: São Paulo
- Number: 56

Youth career
- 2018–: São Paulo
- 2025: → VfB Stuttgart (loan)

Senior career*
Years	Team	Apps	(Gls)
2025–	São Paulo	1	(0)
- * Club domestic league appearances and goals as of 10 January 2026

Nicolas Bosshardt (born 8 April 2007) is a Brazilian-Swiss professional footballer who plays as a left-back for Campeonato Brasileiro Série A club São Paulo.

== Career ==
Revealed from São Paulo's youth academy, Bosshardt rose to prominence in 2024 in the under-17 category, attracting the attention of European clubs such as Barcelona. In 2025, after having his contract renewed until December 2029, he was loaned alongside Samuel Monteiro for an exchange period at VfB Stuttgart, returning to compete in the Campeonato Brasileiro Sub-20. In August, he was promoted to São Paulo's senior squad by coach Hernán Crespo.

On 3 August 2026, Nicolas was arrested after running over an elderly man in the Alphaville neighborhood of São Paulo. However, the day after the incident, provisional release was granted at a custody hearing.

== Honours ==
São Paulo U20

- Copa do Brasil Sub-20: 2025
