= Roque (footballer) =

Brazilian footballer

Personal information
- Full name: Marcelo José Ribeiro
- Date of birth: 16 April 1973 (age 53)
- Place of birth: São Paulo, Brazil
- Height: 1.68 m (5 ft 6 in)
- Position: Defensive midfielder

Youth career
- Portuguesa

Senior career*
Years	Team	Apps	(Gls)
1991–1997	Portuguesa	125	(1)
1998–1999	Guarani	7	(1)
1999–2002	Panionios	15	(1)
2001	→ Matonense (loan)		
2002	Vila Nova		
2003	Portuguesa Santista		
2004	Vila Nova		
- * Club domestic league appearances and goals

Marcelo José Ribeiro (born 16 April 1973), commonly known as Roque , is a former Brazilian footballer.

== Club career ==
Roque played for Portuguesa and Guarani in the Campeonato Brasileiro Série A. He also spent one season with Panionios in the Super League Greece.

== Honours ==
Portuguesa

- Copa São Paulo de Futebol Jr.: 1991

== Personal life ==
He is father of the also defensive midfielder Cauã Lucca, who plays at São Paulo FC youth levels.
