= Guilherme Fumaça =

Brazilian footballer (born 2006)

Personal information
- Full name: Gulherme Batista da Silva Américo
- Date of birth: 20 March 2006 (age 20)
- Place of birth: São Caetano do Sul, Brazil
- Position: Midfielder

Team information
- Current team: São Paulo

Youth career
- 2017–: São Paulo

International career
Years	Team	Apps	(Gls)
2023	Brazil U17	3	(0)

Gulherme Batista da Silva Américo (born 20 March 2006), better known as Guilherme Fumaça, is a Brazilian professional footballer who plays as a midfielder for São Paulo FC.

== Career ==
In the youth sectors of São Paulo FC since 2017, Guilherme gained the attention of several clubs from 2022 onwards, when he signed his first professional contract with a termination clause of R$ 280 million.

Fumaça was called up to the Brazil under-17 team for the first time in January 2023. On 9 November 2023, he was called up again, this time for the 2023 FIFA U-17 World Cup, following an injury of the player Luiz Gustavo. He participated in three matches, against New Caledonia, England and Ecuador.

== Honours ==
São Paulo U20

- Copa São Paulo de Futebol Jr.: 2025
- Copa do Brasil Sub-20: 2025
- Dallas Cup U19: 2024
