= Felipe Negrucci =

Brazilian footballer (born 2004)

Personal information
- Full name: Felipe Negrucci Berdague
- Date of birth: 14 May 2004 (age 22)
- Place of birth: Limeira, Brazil
- Height: 1.80 m (5 ft 11 in)
- Position: Defensive midfielder

Team information
- Current team: Athletic-MG (on loan from São Paulo)

Youth career
- 2015–2025: São Paulo

Senior career*
Years	Team	Apps	(Gls)
2023–	São Paulo	9	(0)
2026–	→ Athletic-MG (loan)	15	(1)
- * Club domestic league appearances and goals as of 18 November 2026

Felipe Negrucci Berdague (born 14 May 2004) is a Brazilian professional footballer who plays as a defensive midfielder for Campeonato Brasileiro Série B club Athletic, on loan from São Paulo.

== Career ==
Born in Limeira, São Paulo, Negrucci joined São Paulo FC's youth setup in 2015, aged 11. On 11 November 2022, he renewed his contract with the club until 2026.

Negrucci made his professional debut with Tricolor on 28 June 2023, coming on as a second-half substitute for Gabriel Neves in a 2–0 home win over Tigre, for the year's Copa Sudamericana. His first Série A appearance occurred on 13 August, again replacing Neves in a 1–1 away draw against Flamengo.

After Dorival Júnior left for the Brazil national team, Negrucci was no longer used in main team, spending the first half of 2024 as just a substitute in few matches. He returned to the youth categories in the second semester where he was part of the U20 Copa do Brasil champion squad. In January 2025, he was the captain in winning campaign of the Copa São Paulo de Futebol Jr.

== Career statistics ==
As of 30 October 2023

Club	Season	League			State League		Cup		Continental		Other		Total	
Club	Season	Division	Apps	Goals	Apps	Goals	Apps	Goals	Apps	Goals	Apps	Goals	Apps	Goals
São Paulo	2023	Série A	1	0	—		0	0	1 (Note: Appearance(s) in Copa Sudamericana)	0	—		2	0
Career total			1	0	0	0	0	0	1	0	0	0	2	0

== Honours ==
São Paulo

- Copa do Brasil: 2023

São Paulo U20

- Copa São Paulo de Futebol Jr.: 2025
- Copa do Brasil Sub-20: 2024
