= 2018 Copa do Brasil Sub-20 =

Tournament details
- Country: Brazil
- Dates: 27 March – 30 May
- Teams: 30

Final positions
- Champions: São Paulo
- Runners-up: Corinthians

Tournament statistics
- Matches played: 46
- Goals scored: 147 (3.2 per match)
- Top goal scorer: Léo Passos
- All statistics correct as of 23 April 2018.

The Copa do Brasil Sub-20 (English: Brazil Under-20 Cup) is a Brazilian football competition run by the Brazilian Football Confederation for under–20 teams. In 2017, Atletico Mineiro won their first title.

== Round of 32 ==
First leg was held from 27 March – 5 April 2018.

Team 1	Agg.	Team 2	1st leg	2nd leg
Atlético Goianiense (Goiás)	1–3	(Pernambuco) Sport	1–0	0–3
Paraná (Paraná (state))	2–3	(Rio de Janeiro (state)) Botafogo	1–0	1–3
Ceará	3–5	(Rio de Janeiro (state)) Fluminense	1–2	2–3
Oeste (São Paulo (state))	0–4	(Rio Grande do Sul) Grêmio	0–4	–
Bahia	3–2	(Paraná (state)) Atlético Paranaense	0–0	3–2
Londrina (Paraná (state))	3–3 (3–4 p)	(Santa Catarina (state)) Chapecoense	2–2	1–1
Vila Nova (Goiás)	4–4 (5–4 p)	(Minas Gerais) Atlético Mineiro	3–1	1–3
Boa (Minas Gerais)	1–9	(São Paulo (state)) Corinthians	1–9	–
Coritiba (Paraná (state))	4–5	(São Paulo (state)) Ponte Preta	3–2	1–3
Figueirense (Santa Catarina (state))	6–4	(São Paulo (state)) Santos	1–1	5–3
América Mineiro (Minas Gerais)	4–5	(São Paulo (state)) Palmeiras	3–2	1–3
Avaí (Santa Catarina (state))	1–4	(Rio de Janeiro (state)) Vasco da Gama	1–4	–
Vitória (Bahia)	5–4	(Rio Grande do Sul) Internacional	3–1	2–3
Paysandu (Paraná (state))	0–2	(Rio de Janeiro (state)) Flamengo	0–2	–
Brasil (Rio Grande do Sul)	2–3	(São Paulo (state)) São Paulo	1–0	1–3
Juventude (Rio Grande do Sul)	4–4 (4–2 p)	(Minas Gerais) Cruzeiro	2–1	2–3

== Round of 16 ==
First leg was held from 11–19 April 2018.

Team 1	Agg.	Team 2	1st leg	2nd leg
Figueirense (Santa Catarina (state))	1–4	(Rio de Janeiro (state)) Botafogo	0–1	1–3
Vila Nova (Goiás)	1–3	(Rio de Janeiro (state)) Vasco da Gama	1–1	0–2
Juventude (Rio Grande do Sul)	2–3	(São Paulo (state)) Ponte Preta	0–2	2–1
Vitória (Bahia)	3–3 (2–4 p)	(Rio de Janeiro (state)) Flamengo	1–1	2–2
Sport (Pernambuco)	2–2 (1–4 p)	(São Paulo (state)) Corinthians	0–0	2–2
Fluminense (Rio de Janeiro (state))	2–4	(Rio Grande do Sul) Grêmio	1–2	1–2
Bahia	2–4	(São Paulo (state)) Palmeiras	0–3	2–1
Chapecoense (Santa Catarina (state))	0–3	(São Paulo (state)) São Paulo	0–3	0–0

== Quarter-finals ==
First leg was held on 25 April and second leg was held from May 1 to 3 2018.

Team 1	Agg.	Team 2	1st leg	2nd leg
Botafogo (Rio de Janeiro (state))	3–3 (4–3 p)	(São Paulo (state)) Ponte Preta	1–0	2–3
Vasco da Gama (Rio de Janeiro (state))	6–7	(São Paulo (state)) São Paulo	5–4	1–3
Grêmio (Rio Grande do Sul)	1–8	(São Paulo (state)) Palmeiras	0–4	1–4
Corinthians (São Paulo (state))	3–3 (3–2 p)	(Rio de Janeiro (state)) Flamengo	1–2	2–1

== Semi-finals ==
First leg was held on May 8 and 9 and second leg was held on May 15 and 17 2018.

Team 1	Agg.	Team 2	1st leg	2nd leg
Botafogo (Rio de Janeiro (state))	0–3	(São Paulo (state)) Corinthians	0–2	0–1
Palmeiras (São Paulo (state))	1–2	(São Paulo (state)) São Paulo	0–1	1–1

== Finals ==
First leg was held on May 26 and second leg was held on June 2 2018.

Team 1	Agg.	Team 2	1st leg	2nd leg
São Paulo (São Paulo (state))	5–2	(São Paulo (state)) Corinthians	1–2	4–0
