= Jonathan Calleri =

Argentine footballer (born 1993)

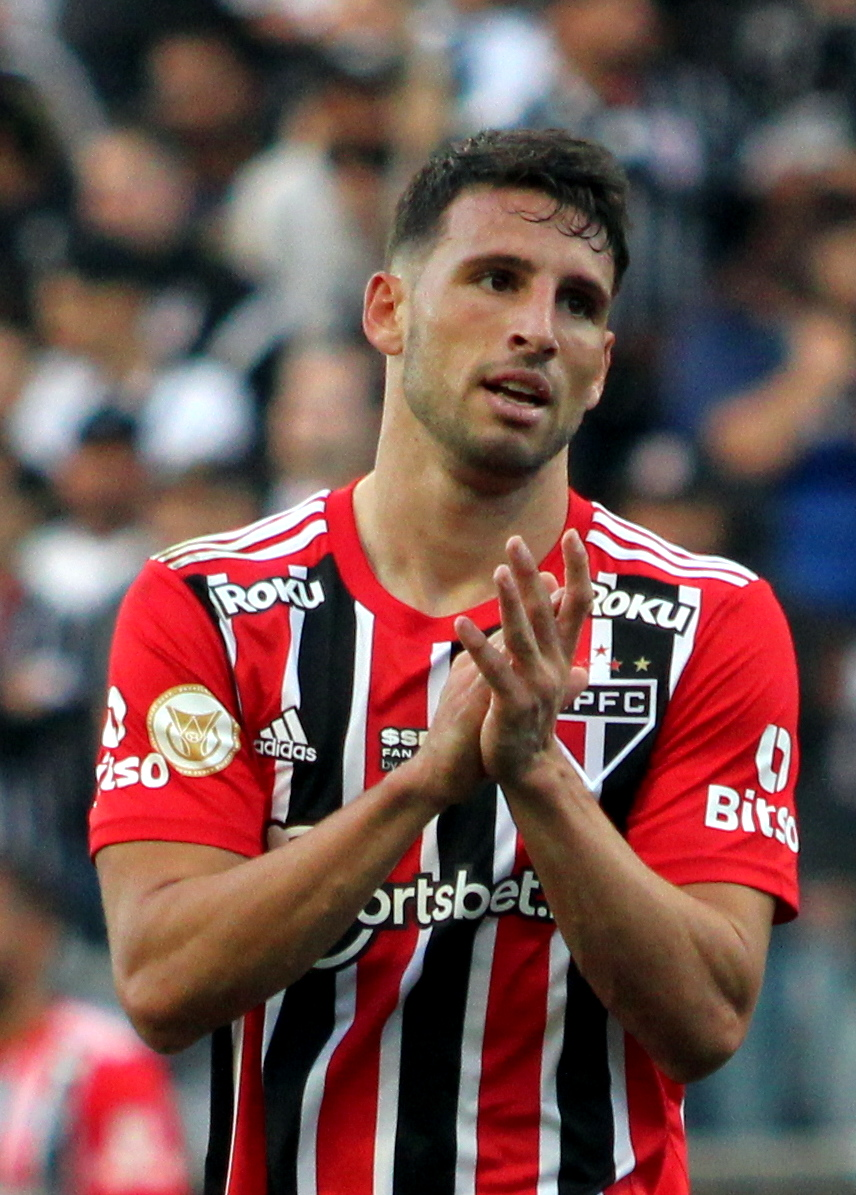
- Calleri playing for São Paulo FC in 2022.

Personal information
- Full name: Jonathan Calleri
- Date of birth: 23 September 1993 (age 33)
- Place of birth: Buenos Aires, Argentina
- Height: 1.82 m (6 ft 0 in)
- Position: Striker

Team information
- Current team: São Paulo
- Number: 9

Youth career
- All Boys

Senior career*
Years	Team	Apps	(Gls)
2013–2014	All Boys	28	(5)
2014–2015	Boca Juniors	41	(16)
2016–2022	Deportivo Maldonado	0	(0)
2016	→ São Paulo (loan)	31	(16)
2016–2017	→ West Ham United (loan)	16	(1)
2017–2018	→ Las Palmas (loan)	37	(9)
2018–2019	→ Alavés (loan)	34	(9)
2019–2020	→ Espanyol (loan)	27	(1)
2020–2021	→ Osasuna (loan)	25	(5)
2021–2022	→ São Paulo (loan)	64	(31)
2022–	São Paulo	160	(43)

International career^{‡}
2016	Argentina Olympic	3	(1)
- * Club domestic league appearances and goals as of 17:29, 12 February 2026 (UTC) ‡ National team caps and goals as of 11 August 2016

Jonathan Calleri (Spanish pronunciation: [ˈɟʝonataŋ kaˈleɾi]; (Note: In isolation, Jonathan is pronounced [ˈɟʝonatan].) Italian: [kalˈlɛːri, ˈkalleri]; born 23 September 1993) is an Argentine professional footballer who plays as a striker for Campeonato Brasileiro Série A club São Paulo.

Calleri started his career at All Boys and played for Boca Juniors for one season before signing for Deportivo Maldonado. A series of loans have since ensued, firstly to Brasileirão club São Paulo, then to Europe with West Ham United of the Premier League, and La Liga clubs Las Palmas, Alavés, Espanyol and Osasuna. After this period of loans to European clubs, he returned to South America, rejoining São Paulo, where he won the 2023 Copa do Brasil.

== Club career ==
=== All Boys ===
On 14 August 2013, Calleri debuted for All Boys against Estudiantes in the quarterfinals of 2012–13 Copa Argentina. He made his league debut on 7 September, against Argentinos Juniors, and played his first full game in his team's defeat against Godoy Cruz on 7 October.

=== Boca Juniors ===
In July 2014, Calleri signed for Boca Juniors, with coach Carlos Bianchi deciding to take-up the right that the club had with the player, a holding of 30% of the player' rights.

On 27 July 2014, Calleri made his Boca debut in a 2–0 loss to Huracan. In the league, his debut came on 18 August as a substitute in a 1–0 win over Belgrano, and a week later coach Rodolfo Arruabarrena started Calleri for the first time in a 3–0 loss to Atlético Rafaela.

On 1 November 2015, Boca Juniors were crowned champions of the Argentine Primera División, in which Calleri scored 10 goals in 26 matches and achieved his first title as a professional player. Three days later, Boca Juniors won the 2014–15 Copa Argentina.

=== Deportivo Maldonado ===
In January 2016, Calleri joined Uruguayan club Deportivo Maldonado. In an arrangement similar to a number of other players that have been registered to the club, but he never actually played a single match for them. He was loaned to Campeonato Brasileiro Série A club São Paulo FC in the same month.

==== São Paulo (loan) ====
On 3 February 2016, Calleri made his debut and scored his first goal for São Paulo as they drew 1–1 with Universidad César Vallejo in the 2016 edition of Copa Libertadores.

On 13 July 2016, Calleri played his last match for São Paulo in a game they lost 1–2 against Atlético Nacional, in the Libertadores semifinals. He scored the only goal for São Paulo, in the 9th minute. Calleri said that it was his last game for the club and that he had "spent very beautiful six months" playing for Brazilian side. He ended the tournament as the top goalscorer, with 9 goals in 12 matches. That year, Calleri scored 16 goals in 31 matches.

==== West Ham United (loan) ====
In August, West Ham United signed Calleri on a season-long loan. He made his Premier League debut coming off the bench in the match against Bournemouth on 21 August 2016. His only goal for the club came in the 94th minute in a 3–1 win against Middlesbrough at the Riverside Stadium on 21 January 2017. His full Premier League debut finally came on 22 April 2017 in a 0–0 draw with Everton at the London Stadium. He played 61 minutes before being replaced by Diafra Sakho. After 19 appearances with one goal scored, Calleri's loan ended.

==== Las Palmas (loan) ====
On 11 July 2017, Calleri joined La Liga side UD Las Palmas on a one-year loan deal. He made his debut for the club on 18 August, starting in a 0–1 away loss against Valencia CF, and scored his first goal seven days later but in a 1–5 home loss against Atlético Madrid. He also scored against Messi's Barcelona in a 1–1 home draw.

==== Alavés (loan) ====
On 22 August 2018, Calleri was loaned to fellow La Liga side Deportivo Alavés for one year. He finished the season with 9 goals, scoring game winners against Girona, and Real Sociedad.

==== Espanyol (loan) ====
On 26 August 2019, joined RCD Espanyol on a season-long loan deal.

Calleri scored a hat-trick for Espanyol in a Europa League match against Wolverhampton Wanderers on 27 February 2020; Espanyol won the match 3–2 but lost the two-legged tie by a score of 6–3.

==== Osasuna (loan) ====
On 13 September 2020, Calleri joined another La Liga club, this time joining Osasuna on a season-long loan deal. He ended the campaign with 6 goals and 2 assists in 27 appearances.

==== São Paulo (second loan spell) ====
On 30 August 2021, Calleri returned to South America after 5 years in Europe, rejoining São Paulo on a 16-month-long loan deal. Calleri finished the season with 5 goals, scoring important goals against Corinthians and Juventude to help the club avoid the danger of relegation.

=== São Paulo ===
On 25 July 2022, São Paulo announced they have activated Calleri's buyout clause, and he signed a contract running until December 2025.

== International career ==
Due to his impressive performances with Boca Juniors and São Paulo, Calleri earned a call-up to the Argentina Olympic squad for the 2016 Summer Olympics. On 29 July 2016, Calleri made his Argentina Olympic debut in a friendly against Mexico, which resulted in a 0–0 draw.

== Personal life ==
Calleri is the nephew of Argentine former footballer Néstor Fabbri.

== Career statistics ==
As of match played 21 August 2026

Appearances and goals by club, season and competition
Club	Season	League			State league (Note: Includes Campeonato Paulista)		National cup (Note: Includes Copa Argentina, Copa del Rey, Copa do Brasil)		League cup (Note: Includes EFL Cup)		Continental		Other		Total	
Club	Season	Division	Apps	Goals	Apps	Goals	Apps	Goals	Apps	Goals	Apps	Goals	Apps	Goals	Apps	Goals
All Boys	2012–13	Argentine Primera División	0	0	—		2	1	—		—		—		2	1
All Boys	2013–14	Argentine Primera División	28	5	—		0	0	—		—		—		28	5
All Boys	Total		28	5	0	0	2	1	0	0	0	0	0	0	30	6
Boca Juniors	2014	Argentine Primera División	16	6	—		—		—		13 (Note: Appearances in Copa Sudamericana)	3	—		29	9
Boca Juniors	2015	Argentine Primera División	26	10	—		5	2	—		4 (Note: Appearances in Copa Libertadores)	3	—		35	15
Boca Juniors	Total		42	16	0	0	5	2	0	0	17	6	0	0	64	24
São Paulo (loan)	2016	Série A	5	3	14	4	0	0	—		12	9	—		31	16
West Ham United (loan)	2016–17	Premier League	16	1	—		0	0	1	0	2 (Note: Appearances in UEFA Europa League)	0	—		19	1
Las Palmas (loan)	2017–18	La Liga	37	9	—		4	3	—		—		—		41	12
Alavés (loan)	2018–19	La Liga	34	9	—		2	0	—		—		—		36	9
Espanyol (loan)	2019–20	La Liga	27	1	—		1	1	—		6	3	—		34	5
Osasuna (loan)	2020–21	La Liga	25	5	—		2	1	—		—		—		27	6
São Paulo (loan)	2021	Série A	16	5	0	0	0	0	—		0	0	—		16	5
São Paulo (loan)	2022	Série A	33	18	15	8	9	0	—		7	1	—		64	27
São Paulo (loan)	Total		49	23	15	8	9	0	0	0	7	1	0	0	80	32
São Paulo	2023	Série A	19	9	8	2	9	1	—		8	2	—		44	14
São Paulo	2024	Série A	27	5	10	3	4	1	—		8	5	1 (Note: Appearance in Supercopa do Brasil)	0	50	14
São Paulo	2025	Série A	3	0	13	3	0	0	—		2	0	—		18	3
São Paulo	2026	Série A	21	7	9	5	0	0	—		5	1	—		35	13
São Paulo	Total		70	21	40	13	13	2	0	0	25	8	1	0	147	44
Career total			333	93	69	25	38	10	1	0	68	27	1	0	509	155

== Honours ==
Boca Juniors

- Primera División: 2015
- Copa Argentina: 2014–15

São Paulo

- Copa do Brasil: 2023
- Supercopa do Brasil: 2024
