= Gustavo Santana =

Brazilian footballer

Personal information
- Full name: Gustavo Domingos Santana
- Date of birth: 20 September 2005 (age 21)
- Place of birth: Santos, Brazil
- Height: 1.83 m (6 ft 0 in)
- Position: Forward

Team information
- Current team: São Paulo
- Number: 43

Youth career
- 2015–2021: Santos
- 2023–2024: EC São Bernardo
- 2024–2025: Cuiabá
- 2025: → São Paulo (loan)
- 2026: São Paulo

Senior career*
| Years | Team | Apps | (Gls) |
| 2023–2024 | EC São Bernardo | 17 | (5) |
| 2026– | São Paulo | 3 | (1) |
- * Club domestic league appearances and goals as of 14:00, 10 August 2026 (UTC)

Gustavo Domingos Santana (born 2 September 2005) is a Brazilian professional footballer who plays as a forward for Campeonato Brasileiro Série A club São Paulo.

== Career ==
Born in Santos, São Paulo, Santana began his career with hometown side Santos FC, before joining EC São Bernardo in 2023. He made his first team debut in that year's Copa Paulista, before moving to Cuiabá for the under-20 squad in July 2024.

On 9 March 2025, Santana was loaned to São Paulo for their under-20 team. In October, the club bought 80% of his economic rights, but only started to feature in trainings of the first team squad in July 2026, during the 2026 FIFA World Cup break.

Santana made his professional – and Série A – debut on 8 August 2026, coming on as a late substitute for Wendell in a 2–1 away loss to Grêmio.

== Career statistics ==
As of 10 August 2026

| Club | Season | League | | | State League | | Cup | | Continental | | Other | | Total | |
| Club | Season | Division | Apps | Goals | Apps | Goals | Apps | Goals | Apps | Goals | Apps | Goals | Apps | Goals |
|---|---|---|---|---|---|---|---|---|---|---|---|---|---|---|
| EC São Bernardo | 2023 | Paulista A3 | — | | — | | — | | — | | 6 (Note: Appearance(s) in Copa Paulista) | 2 | 6 | 2 |
| EC São Bernardo | 2024 | Paulista A3 | — | | 17 | 5 | — | | — | | — | | 17 | 5 |
| EC São Bernardo | Total | | — | | 17 | 5 | — | | — | | 6 | 2 | 23 | 7 |
| Cuiabá | 2024 | Série A | — | | — | | — | | — | | 5 (Note: Appearance(s) in Copa FMF) | 0 | 5 | 0 |
| São Paulo | 2026 | Série A | 1 | 0 | — | | — | | 0 | 0 | — | | 1 | 0 |
| Career total | | | 1 | 0 | 17 | 5 | 0 | 0 | 0 | 0 | 11 | 2 | 29 | 7 |
