= Thiaguinho (footballer, born 2000) =

Brazilian footballer

Personal information
- Full name: Thiago de Oliveira Silva
- Date of birth: 24 September 2000 (age 26)
- Place of birth: Promissão, Brazil
- Position: Attacking midfielder

Team information
- Current team: Inter de Limeira (on loan from Capivariano)

Youth career
- 2015–2019: São Paulo
- 2019–2021: Avaí

Senior career*
Years	Team	Apps	(Gls)
2020–2022	Avaí	7	(0)
2022	→ Manaus (loan)	18	(2)
2022	→ Inter de Limeira (loan)	3	(0)
2023	Juventus-SP	7	(0)
2023	Nacional-AM	4	(0)
2024	Manaus	14	(1)
2024	São Bento	10	(1)
2025–	Capivariano	11	(1)
2025–	→ Inter de Limeira (loan)	9	(0)
- * Club domestic league appearances and goals as of 19 October 2025

Thiago de Oliveira Silva (born 24 September 2000), better known as Thiaguinho, is a Brazilian professional footballer who plays as an attacking midfielder.

== Career ==
Revealed in the youth sectors of São Paulo FC, Thiaguinho was part of the winning squad of the 2019 Copa SP de Futebol Jr. Reserve at São Paulo FC, he caught the attention of Avaí, where he was Santa Catarina state under-20 champion and U-19 Copa Sul champion. After Avaí suffered with athletes in isolation due to COVID-19 outbreak, he was promoted to the professional team.

On 13 November 2023, Thiaguinho signed with Manaus FC to 2024 season. In June 2024, he signed with EC São Bento for the Copa Paulista dispute. For the 2025 season, Thiaguinho signed with Capivariano. A standout player in the club's promotion campaign to 2026 Série A1, he was loaned to Inter de Limeira. However, in early July, he suffered a serious knee injury, missing the season.

== Honours ==
Manaus

- Campeonato Amazonense: 2024

=== Youth ===
São Paulo

- Copa São Paulo de Futebol Jr.: 2019
- Supercopa do Brasil Sub-20: 2018

Avaí

- Campeonato Catarinense Sub-20: 2019
- Copa Sul Sub-19: 2019
