= Lucas Ramon =

Brazilian footballer

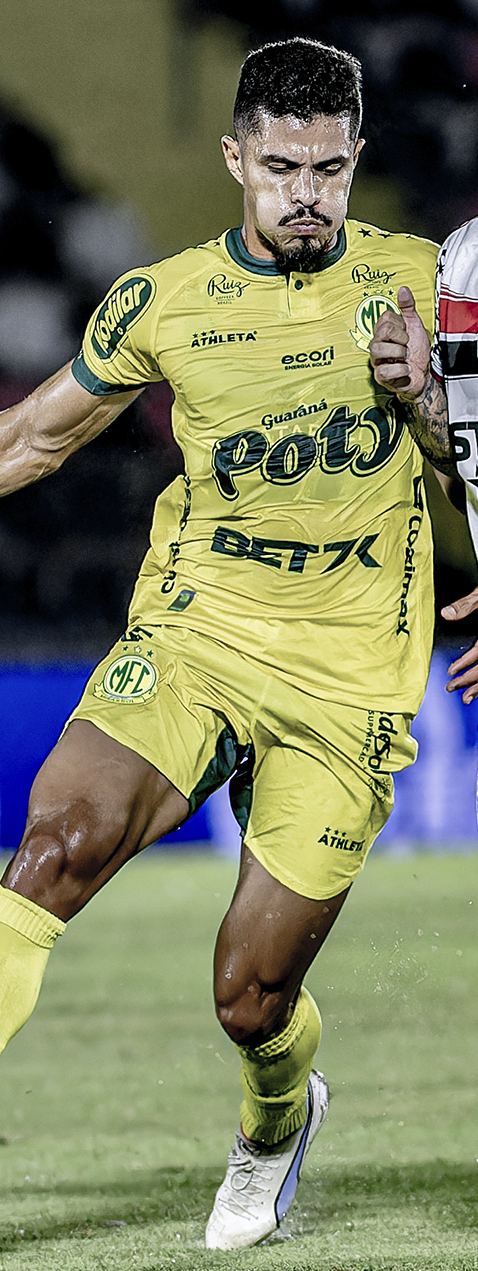
- Lucas Ramon with Mirassol in 2024

Personal information
- Full name: Lucas Ramon Batista Silva
- Date of birth: 7 March 1994 (age 32)
- Place of birth: Montes Claros, Brazil
- Height: 1.78 m (5 ft 10 in)
- Position: Right-back

Team information
- Current team: São Paulo
- Number: 19

Youth career
- 2013: Londrina

Senior career*
Years	Team	Apps	(Gls)
2013–2019	Londrina	82	(4)
2015	→ Grêmio (loan)	6	(0)
2016	→ Santa Cruz (loan)	2	(0)
2019	→ Novorizontino (loan)	12	(0)
2019–2022	Red Bull Bragantino	3	(0)
2020	→ Coritiba (loan)	4	(0)
2020–2021	→ Cuiabá (loan)	46	(0)
2022	→ Novorizontino (loan)	5	(0)
2022	→ Guarani (loan)	19	(1)
2023	Mirassol	47	(3)
2024	Sport Recife	6	(1)
2024–2025	Mirassol	81	(5)
2026–	São Paulo	10	(1)
- * Club domestic league appearances and goals as of 6 April 2026

Lucas Ramon Batista Silva (born 7 March 1994), known as Lucas Ramon, is a Brazilian professional footballer who plays as a right-back for Campeonato Brasileiro Série A club São Paulo.

The player has previously represented Londrina in Campeonato Brasileiro Série B, Campeonato Brasileiro Série C and Campeonato Brasileiro Série D and Grêmio in Campeonato Brasileiro Série A.

== Career ==
During Londrina's 2014 season, Lucas Ramon was considered a "breakout" player.

On 5 June 2015, Lucas Ramon was announced at Grêmio on a one year loan spell.

On 28 December 2015, Lucas Ramon was announced at Santa Cruz on a loan until the end of the year.

In July 2016, Lucas Ramon returned to Londrina after spending time on loan at Santa Cruz.

On 29 December 2018, Lucas Ramon was announced at Novorizontino. He was described as "standing out" during his time at the club.

On 12 January 2020, Lucas Ramon was loaned to Cortibia until the end of the year. He was signed to compete with Yan Couto.

On 17 June 2020, Lucas Ramon terminated his contract with Cortibia and was loaned to Cuiabá. After the club was promoted to the Série A, he renewed his loan contract with the club until the end of the year.

On 18 January 2022, Lucas Ramon was announced at Novorizontino on a loan deal until the end of the season.

On 6 December 2023, Lucas Ramon was announced at Sport Recife on a contract until the end of the 2024 season.

On 3 February 2026, Lucas Ramon was announced at São Paulo on a permanent transfer, signing a two year contract, with the option of another season if certain goals are met.

== Career statistics ==
As of 6 February 2022.

Appearances and goals by club, season and competition
Club	Season	League			State League		Copa do Brasil		Continental		Other		Total	
Club	Season	Division	Apps	Goals	Apps	Goals	Apps	Goals	Apps	Goals	Apps	Goals	Apps	Goals
Londrina	2013	Série D	0	0	—		—		—		—		0	0
Londrina	2014	Série D	14	2	0	0	3	0	—		—		17	2
Londrina	2015	Série C	2	0	13	0	2	0	—		—		17	0
Londrina	2016	Série B	14	1	—		—		—		—		14	1
Londrina	2017	Série B	18	0	3	0	1	0	—		2 (Note: Appearance(s) in Primeira Liga)	0	24	0
Londrina	2018	Série B	24	1	4	0	0	0	—		—		28	1
Londrina	Total		72	4	20	0	6	0	—		2	0	100	4
Grêmio (loan)	2015	Série A	6	0	—		—		—		—		6	0
Santa Cruz (loan)	2016	Série A	0	0	2	0	1	0	—		0	0	3	0
Novorizontino (loan)	2019	Paulista	—		12	0	—		—		—		12	0
Red Bull Bragantino	2019	Série B	3	0	—		—		—		—		3	0
Coritiba (loan)	2020	Série A	0	0	4	0	0	0	—		—		4	0
Cuiabá (loan)	2020	Série B	25	0	—		3	0	—		1 (Note: Appearance(s) in Copa Verde)	0	29	0
Cuiabá (loan)	2021	Série A	10	0	11	0	2	0	—		0	0	23	0
Cuiabá (loan)	Total		35	0	11	0	5	0	—		1	0	52	0
Novorizontino (loan)	2022	Série B	0	0	4	0	0	0	—		—		4	0
Career Total			116	4	58	0	12	0	—		3	0	184	4

== Honours ==
Londrina

- Campeonato Paranaense: 2014
- Primeira Liga: 2017

Santa Cruz

- Campeonato Pernambucano: 2016
- Copa do Nordeste: 2016

Red Bull Bragantino

- Campeonato Brasileiro Série B: 2019

Cuiabá

- Campeonato Mato-Grossense: 2021
