= Paulinho (footballer, born April 1992) =

Brazilian footballer

Personal information
- Full name: Paulo Henrique Martins Eugenio
- Date of birth: April 23, 1992 (age 34)
- Place of birth: São Paulo, Brazil
- Position: Midfielder

Youth career
- 2008–2010: São Paulo FC

Senior career*
Years	Team	Apps	(Gls)
2010–2012	São Paulo FC	?	(?)
2013	Noroeste	?	(?)
2013	Mirassol	?	(?)
2014	Universitatea Cluj	8	(1)
- * Club domestic league appearances and goals as of March 30, 2019

Paulo Henrique Martins Eugenio (born 23 April 1992 in São Paulo), known as Paulinho is a Brazilian former footballer who played as a midfielder.

== Career ==
Paulinho started to play football in his hometown at São Paulo FC. In 2013, he also played for the lower league Brazilian teams Esporte Clube Noroeste and Mirassol Futebol Clube. On 18 June 2014 the Romanian first league team Universitatea Cluj announced the transfer of Paulinho.
