= Luis Osorio (footballer) =

Brazilian footballer

Personal information
- Full name: Luis Osorio Messias de Oliveira
- Date of birth: 6 September 2006 (age 20)
- Place of birth: Uberaba, Brazil
- Height: 1.91 m (6 ft 3 in)
- Position: Centre-back

Team information
- Current team: São Paulo
- Number: 54

Youth career
- –2021: AECAI Uberaba
- 2021–2023: Desportivo Brasil
- 2023: → São Paulo (loan)
- 2024–: São Paulo

Senior career*
Years	Team	Apps	(Gls)
2026–	São Paulo	5	(0)
- * Club domestic league appearances and goals as of 14 May 2026

Luis Osorio Messias de Oliveira (born 6 September 2006), mostly known as Luis Osorio, is a Brazilian professional footballer who plays as a centre-back for Campeonato Brasileiro Série A club São Paulo.

== Career ==
Born in Uberaba, Osorio began his career in the under-15 team of Desportivo Brasil, where he remained until 2023, when he was loaned to São Paulo. He was permanently acquired in 2024, participating in important achievements in the under-20 category such as the two-time U20 Copa do Brasil championship and the Copa São Paulo de Futebol Júnior. In April 2026, he was promoted to the main squad of São Paulo FC, making his debut in the match against Millonarios for the 2026 Copa Sudamericana.

In February 2026, Osorio renewed his contract with São Paulo until 2030, with a release clause set at €100 million.

== Honours ==
São Paulo U20

- Copa do Brasil Sub-20: 2024, 2025
- Copa São Paulo de Futebol Júnior: 2025
- Dallas Cup U19: 2024
