= Danielzinho (footballer, born 1994) =

Brazilian footballer

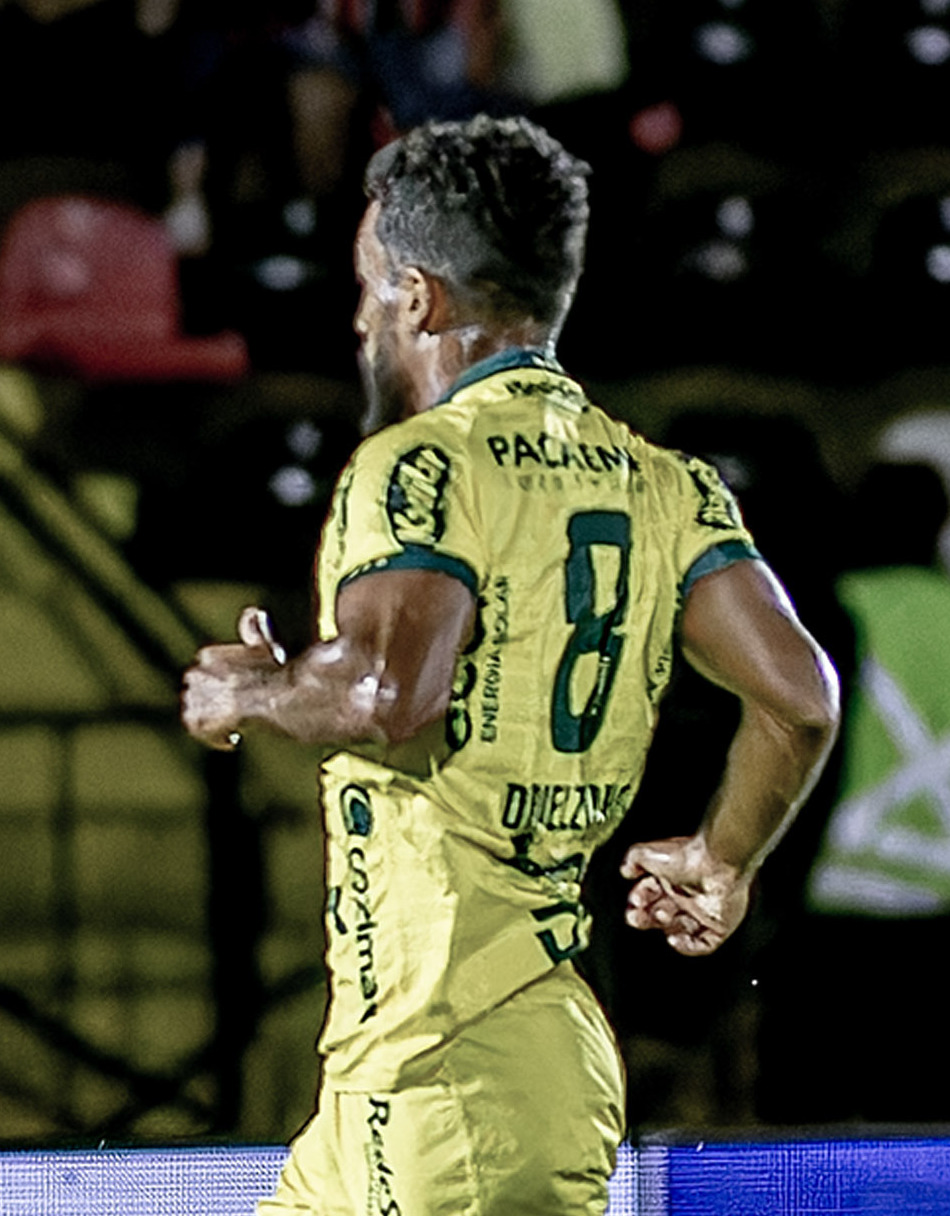
- Danielzinho playing for Mirassol in 2024

Personal information
- Full name: Daniel de Oliveira Sertanejo
- Date of birth: 4 November 1994 (age 32)
- Place of birth: Andradina, Brazil
- Height: 1.66 m (5 ft 5 in)
- Position: Midfielder

Team information
- Current team: São Paulo
- Number: 94

Youth career
- Itapirense
- 2012: Marília
- 2012–2014: Atlético Mineiro

Senior career*
Years	Team	Apps	(Gls)
2011	Itapirense	2	(0)
2012	Marília	4	(0)
2013–2016	Atlético Mineiro	2	(0)
2015	→ Boa Esporte (loan)	7	(0)
2015	→ Paraná (loan)	14	(1)
2016	→ Ferroviária (loan)	10	(0)
2016–2017	Audax	9	(0)
2016	→ Oeste (loan)	27	(0)
2017	Coimbra	11	(3)
2018	Linense	7	(0)
2018–2019	Sampaio Corrêa	20	(0)
2019–2022	Novorizontino	120	(11)
2023–2025	Mirassol	145	(6)
2026–	São Paulo	17	(1)
- * Club domestic league appearances and goals as of 6 April 2026

Daniel de Oliveira Sertanejo (born 4 November 1994), commonly known as Danielzinho, is a Brazilian professional footballer who plays as a midfielder for Campeonato Brasileiro Série A club São Paulo.

== Career ==
=== Early career ===
Born in Andradina, São Paulo, Danielzinho began his career with Itapirense, and made his first team debut with the side in the 2011 Campeonato Paulista Série A3. He moved to Marília in 2012, spending a period with the under-20 team and also playing for the main squad before joining Atlético Mineiro, where he returned to the youth setup.

=== Atlético Mineiro ===
Danielzinho made his first team – and Série A – debut for Galo on 6 October 2013, coming on as a late substitute for Fernandinho in a 0–0 home draw against Corinthians. On 19 January 2015, after just one more match with the main squad, he was announced at Boa Esporte on loan.

In July 2015, Danielzinho moved to fellow Série B side Paraná on loan until the end of the year. On 4 January 2016, he joined Ferroviária also in a temporary deal for the 2016 Campeonato Paulista.

=== Audax ===
On 20 May 2016, after agreeing to a contract with Luverdense, Danielzinho was announced at Oeste, with the owners of his economic rights assigning him to Audax. A regular starter, he returned to Audax for the 2017 season, but finished the year at Coimbra.

=== Sampaio Corrêa ===
On 10 April 2018, after a short spell at Linense, Danielzinho was presented at Sampaio Corrêa. He helped the club to win the 2018 Copa do Nordeste, but never established himself as a first-choice.

=== Novorizontino ===
On 14 December 2018, Danielzinho was presented at Novorizontino for the upcoming season. He immediately became a starter, featuring in the club's two consecutive promotions in his first two seasons.

=== Mirassol ===
On 8 December 2022, Mirassol announced the signing of Danielzinho.

== Career statistics ==
As of 6 March 2024.

Club	Season	League			State League		Cup		Continental		Other		Total	
Club	Season	Division	Apps	Goals	Apps	Goals	Apps	Goals	Apps	Goals	Apps	Goals	Apps	Goals
Itapirense	2011	Paulista A3	—		2 (Note: Appearances in the Campeonato Paulista Série A3)	0	—		—		—		2	0
Marília	2012	Série D	4	0	0	0	—		—		—		4	0
Atlético Mineiro	2013	Série A	1	0	0	0	0	0	—		—		1	0
Atlético Mineiro	2014	Série A	1	0	0	0	0	0	—		—		1	0
Atlético Mineiro	Total		2	0	0	0	0	0	—		—		2	0
Boa Esporte (loan)	2015	Série B	5	0	2 (Note: Appearances in the Campeonato Mineiro)	0	0	0	—		—		7	0
Paraná (loan)	2015	Série B	14	1	—		—		—		—		14	1
Ferroviária (loan)	2016	Série D	0	0	10 (Note: Appearances in the Campeonato Paulista)	0	4	0	—		—		14	0
Oeste (loan)	2016	Série B	27	0	—		—		—		—		27	0
Osasco Audax	2017	Série D	3	0	6	0	1	0	—		—		10	0
Coimbra	2017	Mineiro Segunda Divisão	—		11 (Note: Appearances in the Campeonato Mineiro Segunda Divisão)	3	—		—		—		11	3
Linense	2018	Série D	0	0	7	0	—		—		—		7	0
Sampaio Corrêa	2018	Série B	20	0	—		—		—		5 (Note: Appearances in the Copa do Nordeste)	0	25	0
Novorizontino	2019	Série D	8	1	7	0	—		—		—		15	1
Novorizontino	2020	Série D	19	1	9	1	1	0	—		—		29	2
Novorizontino	2021	Série C	22	1	14	4	—		—		—		36	5
Novorizontino	2022	Série B	29	2	12	1	1	0	—		—		42	3
Novorizontino	Total		78	5	42	6	2	0	—		—		122	11
Mirassol	2023	Série B	33	1	13	2	—		—		—		46	3
Mirassol	2024	Série B	0	0	11	0	—		—		—		11	0
Mirassol	Total		33	1	24	2	—		—		—		57	3
Career total			186	7	104	11	7	0	0	0	5	0	302	18
