= Lucas Mendes (footballer, born 1992) =

Brazilian association football player

Personal information
- Full name: Lucas Ferreira Mendes da Silva
- Date of birth: 19 February 1992 (age 34)
- Place of birth: Guariba, Brazil
- Height: 1.74 m (5 ft 9 in)
- Position: Right-back

Team information
- Current team: Botafogo-PB

Youth career
- 2008–2012: São Paulo

Senior career*
| Years | Team | Apps | (Gls) |
| 2011–2013 | São Paulo | 0 (Note: Soccerway shows one appearance in 2011 Campeonato Brasileiro Série A, but there is no evidence of this when clicking through.) | (0) |
| 2012 | → Santo André (loan) | 0 | (0) |
| 2014 | Inter de Bebedouro | 0 | (0) |
| 2015 | Barretos | 1 | (0) |
| 2015 | Uberaba | 0 | (0) |
| 2016 | Barretos | 13 | (0) |
| 2016 | → São Bento (loan) | 9 | (0) |
| 2017 | São Bento | 9 | (0) |
| 2018 | Sertãozinho | 11 | (0) |
| 2018–2019 | Botafogo-SP | 41 | (0) |
| 2020–2021 | CRB | 35 | (0) |
| 2021 | Santo André | 3 | (0) |
| 2021–2022 | Novorizontino | 25 | (1) |
| 2022 | Água Santa | 0 | (0) |
| 2022– | Botafogo-PB | 10 | (0) |
- * Club domestic league appearances and goals as of 7 October 2023 ‡ National team caps and goals as of

Lucas Ferreira Mendes da Silva, commonly known as Lucas Mendes (born 19 February 1992), is a Brazilian footballer who plays as a right-back.

== Career ==
Lucas Mendes came through the youth ranks with São Paulo. After performing well in the 2011 Copa São Paulo de Futebol Júnior he was loaned to Santo André in 2012 for their second division Campeonato Paulista campaign. Between 2014 and 2016 he represented Inter de Bebedouro, Barretos and Uberaba in the lower divisions of Campeonato Paulista and Campeonato Mineiro. He was loaned by Barretos to São Bento in May 2016 to play in 2016 Campeonato Brasileiro Série D. São Bento won promotion, and he stayed with them for the whole of 2017, winning promotion again from 2017 Campeonato Brasileiro Série C.

In November 2017 it was announce that Lucas Mendes had signed for Taubaté to compete in the 2018 Campeonato Paulista second division, but by the time the season started in January he had moved to rivals Sertãozinho. In April 2018 he signed for Botafogo-SP to compete in 2018 Campeonato Brasileiro Série C. After gaining promotion at the end of the season, he renewed his contract with Botafogo-SP for a further year.
