= 2025 Copa São Paulo de Futebol Júnior =

55th edition of the Copa São Paulo de Futebol Júnior

Copinha Sicredi 2025

Tournament details
- Country: Brazil
- Dates: 2 January – 25 January
- Teams: 128

Final positions
- Champions: (São Paulo (state)) São Paulo (5th title)
- Runners-up: (São Paulo (state)) Corinthians

Tournament statistics
- Matches played: 255
- Goals scored: 700 (2.75 per match)
- Top goal scorer(s): Ryan Francisco (São Paulo) (10 goals)

The 2025 Copa São Paulo de Futebol Júnior (also known as Copinha Sicredi 2025 for sponsorship reasons), was the 55th edition of the Copa São Paulo de Futebol Júnior, a youth football competition, organized by the São Paulo Federation of Football (FPF).

Considered one of the most traditional in Brazil, the 2025 edition takes place between January 2 and 25 and is contested by 128 teams divided into 32 groups. The top two teams in each group advance to the next stage, which will be played in knockout matches. Therefore, the teams will be reduced by half at each stage until the final.

São Paulo won Corinthians; the defending champion, in a distinct Clássico Majestoso match that ended in a comeback 3-2 for São Paulo.

== Format and participants ==
On November 25, 2024, the FPF announced the groups and venues for the 2025 edition that will end on the anniversary of the city of São Paulo, January 25.

As venue cities are: Araraquara, Bálsamo, Barueri, Brodowski, Capivari, Cravinhos, Embu das Artes, Franca, Guaratinguetá, Guarulhos, Itapira, Itaquaquecetuba, Jaú, Lins, Mogi das Cruzes, Osasco, Porto Feliz, Salto, Santa Fé do Sul, Santana de Parnaíba, Santo André, São Carlos, São Paulo, Suzano, Tanabi, Taubaté, Tietê, Tupã, Votorantim e Votuporanga.

The 128 participants by state are:

- Acre: Rio Branco Futebol Clube and Santa Cruz-AC
- Alagoas: Clube de Regatas Brasil (CRB), Jaciobá Atlético Clube and Zumbi Esporte Clube
- Amapá: Mazagão Atlético Clube
- Amazonas: Nacional Fast Clube (Fast Clube)
- Bahia: Esporte Clube Bahia, Estrela de Março, Esporte Clube Vitória and Vitória da Conquista
- Ceará: Ceará Sporting Club, Ferroviário, Floresta Esporte Clube and Tirol
- Distrito Federal: Brasiliense, Canaã Esporte Clube and Real Brasília FC
- Espírito Santo: Porto Vitória Futebol Clube and Rio Branco Atlético Clube
- Goiás: Atlético Clube Goianiense, Goiás Esporte Clube, Trindade Atlético Clube and Vila Nova Futebol Clube
- Maranhão: IAPE and Imperatriz
- Mato Grosso: Cuiabá Esporte Clube and Clube Esportivo Dom Bosco
- Mato Grosso do Sul: Dourados Atlético Clube and Operário Atlético Clube
- Minas Gerais: Clube Atlético Mineiro, América Futebol Clube (MG), Cruzeiro Esporte Clube, Coimbra Sports and Inter de Minas
- Pará: Carajás Esporte Clube, Capitão Poço Esporte Clube and Tuna Luso
- Paraíba: Cruzeiro-PB and Serra Branca Esporte Clube
- Parana: Club Athletico Paranaense, Coritiba Foot Ball Club, Azuriz Futebol Clube, Futebol Clube Cascavel and Operário Ferroviário Esporte Clube
- Pernambuco: Clube Náutico Capibaribe, Retrô Futebol Clube Brasil, Santa Cruz Futebol Clube and Sport Club do Recife
- Piauí: Sociedade Esportiva de Picos and Piauí Esporte Clube
- Rio de Janeiro: America, Boavista Sport Club, Botafogo de Futebol e Regatas, Clube de Regatas Flamengo, Fluminense Futebol Clube, Madureira Esporte Clube, and Clube de Regatas Vasco da Gama
- Rio Grande do Norte: ABC Futebol Clube, America de Natal and Centro Esportivo Força e Luz
- Rio Grande do Sul: Gremio Foot-Ball Porto Alegrense, SC Internacional, Esporte Clube Juventude and São José Esporte Clube
- Rondônia: Porto Velho Esporte Clube and Sport Club Genus de Porto Velho
- Roraima: Monte Roraima and Náutico Futebol Clube
- Santa Catarina: Avaí Futebol Clube Barra, Criciúma Esporte Clube, Hercílio Luz Futebol Clube and Clube Náutico Marcílio Dias
- São Paulo: Esporte Clube Água Santa, Aster, Atlético Guaratinguetá, Audax, Bandeirante de Brodowski, Botafogo-SP, Capivariano Futebol Clube, Comercial Futebol Clube de São Paulo, Comercial Tiete, Sport Club Corinthians Paulista, Desportivo Brasil, Associação Ferroviária de Esportes, Associação Atlética Flamengo, Associação Atlética Francana, Guarani Futebol Clube, Ibrachina Futebol Clube, Inter de Limeira, Sociedade Esportiva Itapirense, Ituano Futebol Clube, Clube Atlético Juventus, Clube Atlético Linense, Mirassol Futebol Clube, Nacional Atlético Clube, Grêmio Novorizontino, Oeste Futebol Clube, Sociedade Esportiva Palmeiras, Associação Atlética Ponte Preta, Associação Portuguesa de Desportos, Portuguesa Santista, Red Bull Bragantino, Referencia, Santa Fe-SP, Esporte Clube Santo André, Santos Futebol Clube, Esporte Clube São Bento, Associação Desportiva São Caetano, Grêmio Desportivo São-Carlense, São Paulo Futebol Clube, Esporte Clube São Bernardo, Sfera, Tanabi Esporte Clube, Esporte Clube Taubaté, Tupã Futebol Clube, União Suzano, Votoraty Futebol Clube, CA Votuporanguense, Esporte Clube XV de Novembro (Jaú) and Esporte Clube XV de Piracicaba
- Sergipe: América de Pedrinhas, Falcon and Sergipe
- Tocantins: Araguacema Futebol Clube and União Atlético Clube

== Final phases ==
=== Round of 64 ===
Winner	Score	Eliminated
Botafogo	2-1	IAPE
Ponte Preta	2-0	Votuporanguense
Operário	1 (4) - (5) 1	Mirassol
Criciúma	0 (3) - (1) 0	Santa Cruz
Guarani	3-0	Bandeirante de Brodowski
Botafogo (SP)	1-3	Atlético Mineiro
Ferroviária	2 (7) - (6) 2	Vitoria
São José	0-3	Santos
Água Santa	2-1	Linense
Fluminense	3-0	Clube de Regatas Brasil
São Paulo	4-0	America de Natal
Juventude	1-0	XV de Jau
Cruzeiro	1 (5) - (3) 1	America-RJ
Portuguesa	3-0	Real Brasília
Desportivo Brasil	1-2	Bahia
Capivariano	1 (4) - (5) 1	Coritiba
Audax	0 (4) - (1) 0	Votoraty
Novorizontino	0-2	Athletico Paranaense
Palmeiras	2-1	Referência
Sport Recife	0 (5) - (4) 0	Oeste
Grêmio	1-0	Marcílio Dias
Goiás	1 (5) - (4) 1	Vitória da Conquista
Zumbi	1-0	União Suzano
Red Bull Bragantino	3-1	Flamengo
Ituano	0 (17) - (16) 0	Sfera
América-MG	1 (1) - (3) 1	Fortaleza
Santo André	0-1	Vila Nova
Falcon	0-1	Corinthians
Flamengo-SP	1-0	Náutico
Ibrachina	2-0	Barra-SC
Juventus da Mooca	0-1	Vasco da Gama
XV de Piracicaba	0-4	Ceará

=== Round of 32 ===
Winner	Score	Eliminated
Botafogo	1-0	Ponte Preta
Mirassol	0-2	Criciúma
Guarani	3-1	Atlético Mineiro
Ferroviária	2 (6) - (5) 2	Santos
Água Santa	0-1	Fluminense
São Paulo	1-0	Juventude
Cruzeiro	3-1	Portuguesa
Bahia	2-0	Coritiba
Audax	1-0	Athletico Paranaense
Palmeiras	2-0	Sport Recife
Grêmio	4-0	Goiás
Zumbi	0-7	Red Bull Bragantino
Ituano	3-2	Fortaleza
Vila Nova	1-4	Corinthians
Flamengo-SP	1 (3) - (0) 1	Ibrachina
Vasco da Gama	3-2	Ceará

=== Round of 16 ===
Winner	Score	Eliminated
Botafogo	2-4	Criciúma
Guarani	0-2	Ferroviária
Fluminense	0 (4) - (5) 0	São Paulo
Cruzeiro	3-0	Bahia
Audax	0-4	Palmeiras
Grêmio	2 (5) - (4) 2	Red Bull Bragantino
Ituano	0 (4) - (5) 0	Corinthians
Flamengo-SP	3-5	Vasco da Gama

=== Quarter-finals ===
Winner	Score	Eliminated
Criciúma	1-0	Ferroviária
São Paulo	3-1	Cruzeiro
Palmeiras	2-3	Grêmio
Corinthians	1-0	Vasco da Gama

=== Semi-finals ===
Winner	Score	Eliminated
Criciúma	1-2	São Paulo
Grêmio	0-1	Corinthians

=== Final ===
Date	Finalist	Score	Finalist	Venue
01/25/25	São Paulo	3-2	Corinthians	São Paulo

== Final standings ==
Pos.	Team	P	MP	W	D	L	GS	GA	GD
1	São Paulo	25	9	8	1	0	24	4	20
2	Corinthians	19	9	6	1	2	15	6	9
3	Criciúma	19	8	6	1	1	14	5	9
4	Grêmio	17	8	5	2	1	16	6	10
5	Palmeiras	16	7	5	1	1	25	5	20
6	Cruzeiro	15	7	4	2	1	13	6	7
7	Ferroviária	12	7	3	3	1	16	6	10
8	Vasco da Gama	12	7	3	3	1	11	8	3
9	Red Bull Bragantino	16	6	5	1	0	23	6	17
10	Fluminense	16	6	5	1	0	13	1	12
11	Botafogo	15	6	5	0	1	9	6	3
12	Osasco Audax	13	6	4	1	1	7	4	3
13	Guarani	12	6	4	0	2	13	5	8
14	Ituano	12	6	3	3	0	8	5	3
15	Bahia	12	6	4	0	2	7	7	0
16	Flamengo-SP	11	6	3	2	1	8	6	2
17	Ibrachina	11	5	3	2	0	14	4	10
18	Santos	10	5	3	1	1	14	5	9
19	Ceará	10	5	3	1	1	12	5	7
20	Portuguesa	10	5	3	1	1	11	4	7
21	Ponte Preta	10	5	3	1	1	9	2	7
22	Goiás	10	5	3	1	1	7	8	-1
23	Zumbi	10	5	3	1	1	6	9	-3
24	Água Santa	9	5	3	0	2	10	7	3
25	Atlético Mineiro	9	5	3	0	2	9	6	3
26	Athletico Paranaense	9	5	3	0	2	6	4	2
27	Juventude	9	5	3	0	2	5	3	2
28	Sport	8	5	2	2	1	6	2	4
29	Vila Nova	8	5	2	2	1	5	5	0
30	Mirassol	7	5	2	1	2	6	8	-2
31	Coritiba	6	5	1	3	1	5	6	-1
32	Fortaleza	5	5	1	2	2	8	7	1
33	Operário-PR	10	4	3	1	0	16	2	14
34	Santo André	9	4	3	0	1	6	2	4
35	Capivariano	8	4	2	2	0	6	2	4
36	Votoraty	8	4	2	2	0	4	0	4
37	Novorizontino	7	4	2	1	1	8	2	6
38	América Mineiro	7	4	3	1	0	7	1	6
39	Botafogo-SP	7	4	2	1	1	11	6	5
40	Juventus-SP	7	4	2	1	1	7	2	5
41	Náutico	7	4	2	1	1	6	4	2
42	Referência	7	4	2	1	1	4	3	1
43	Sfera	7	4	2	1	1	3	2	1
44	America	7	4	2	1	1	5	5	0
45	XV de Piracicaba	7	4	2	1	1	4	6	-2
46	Oeste	6	4	1	3	0	8	2	6
47	Flamengo	6	4	2	0	2	10	6	4
48	Vitória	6	4	1	3	0	5	3	2
49	XV de Jaú	6	4	2	0	2	5	3	2
50	Linense	6	4	2	0	2	7	6	1
51	Votuporanguense	6	4	2	0	2	5	5	0
52	União Suzano	6	4	2	0	2	4	4	0
53	São José-RS	6	4	2	0	2	4	5	-1
54	CRB	6	4	2	0	2	5	7	-2
55	CA Bandeirante	6	4	2	0	2	4	8	-4
56	Santa Cruz	5	4	1	2	1	6	2	4
57	Desportivo Brasil	5	4	1	2	1	8	6	2
58	IAPE	5	4	1	2	1	4	3	1
59	Falcon	5	4	1	2	1	3	2	1
60	Real Brasília	5	4	1	2	1	5	6	-1
61	Vitória da Conquista	5	4	1	2	1	3	6	–3
62	Marcílio Dias	4	4	1	1	2	6	7	-1
63	Barra-SC	4	4	1	1	2	3	5	-2
64	América de Natal	4	4	1	1	2	6	9	-3
65	Atlético Goianiense	4	3	1	1	1	4	1	3
66	São Bento	4	3	1	1	1	6	5	1
67	Aster-SP	4	3	1	1	1	4	3	1
68	Dom Bosco	4	3	1	1	1	4	3	1
69	Sergipe	4	3	1	1	1	4	3	1
70	Cuiabá	4	3	1	1	1	3	2	1
71	Tirol	4	3	1	1	1	2	1	1
72	Azuriz	4	3	1	1	1	6	6	0
73	Nova Iguaçu	4	3	1	1	1	2	2	0
74	Comercial	4	3	1	1	1	1	2	–1
75	América de Pedrinhas	4	3	1	1	1	3	4	–1
76	Operário de Caarapó	4	3	1	1	1	3	4	–1
77	São Carlos	4	3	1	1	1	3	4	–1
78	Tanabi	4	3	1	1	1	3	8	–5
79	Floresta	3	3	1	0	2	4	3	1
80	Brasiliense	3	3	1	0	2	5	5	0
81	Inter de Limeira	3	3	1	0	2	4	4	0
82	Piauí	3	3	1	0	2	3	3	0
83	Porto Vitória	3	3	1	0	2	3	3	0
84	Avaí	3	3	1	0	2	5	6	–1
85	Capitão Poço	3	3	1	0	2	4	5	–1
86	Taubaté	3	3	1	0	2	4	5	–1
87	Comercial Tietê	3	3	1	0	2	4	6	–2
88	Serra Branca	3	3	1	0	2	2	4	–2
89	Porto Velho	3	3	1	0	2	4	7	–3
90	ABC	3	3	1	0	2	3	7	–4
91	Mazagão	3	3	1	0	2	2	6	–4
92	Tupã	3	3	1	0	2	2	6	–4
93	Araguacema	3	3	1	0	2	5	10	–5
94	Canaã	2	3	0	2	1	2	3	–1
95	Nacional-SP	2	3	0	2	1	2	3	–1
96	Atlético Guaratinguetá	2	3	0	2	1	1	3	–2
97	Santa Cruz-AC	2	3	0	2	1	2	7	–5
98	Cruzeiro-PB	2	3	0	2	1	1	6	–5
99	FC Cascavel	1	3	0	1	2	2	4	–2
100	Inter de Minas	1	3	0	1	2	1	3	–2
101	Internacional	1	3	0	1	2	0	2	–2
102	Retrô	1	3	0	1	2	1	4	–3
103	EC São Bernardo	1	3	0	1	2	1	5	–4
104	Trindade	1	3	0	1	2	1	5	–4
105	Carajás	1	3	0	1	2	3	8	–5
106	Hercílio Luz	1	3	0	1	2	3	8	–5
107	Dourados	1	3	0	1	2	1	6	–5
108	Boavista-RJ	1	3	0	1	2	3	9	–6
109	Portuguesa Santista	1	3	0	1	2	2	8	–6
110	Francana	1	3	0	1	2	1	9	–8
111	Náutico-RR	1	3	0	1	2	1	16	–15
112	Ferroviário	0	3	0	0	3	2	5	–3
113	Rio Branco-ES	0	3	0	0	3	3	7	–4
114	Imperatriz	0	3	0	0	3	2	7	–5
115	Madureira	0	3	0	0	3	0	5	–5
116	Fast Clube	0	3	0	0	3	3	9	–6
117	Rio Branco-AC	0	3	0	0	3	3	9	–6
118	Monte Roraima	0	3	0	0	3	2	8	–6
119	Tuna Luso	0	3	0	0	3	2	8	–6
120	Estrela de Março	0	3	0	0	3	1	8	–7
121	Genus	0	3	0	0	3	0	8	–8
122	União-TO	0	3	0	0	3	0	8	–8
123	Itapirense	0	3	0	0	3	1	10	–9
124	Santa Fé-SP	0	3	0	0	3	1	10	–9
125	Coimbra	0	3	0	0	3	3	13	–10
126	Picos	0	3	0	0	3	1	12	–11
127	Força e Luz	0	3	0	0	3	2	15	–13
128	Jaciobá	0	3	0	0	3	1	17	–16

== Impact ==
=== Transmission and audience ===
The 2025 edition of the Copa São Paulo de Futebol Júnior was broadcast on the pay-TV channel SporTV, as well as on the FPF's YouTube channel and on CazéTV. The final match was also shown on TV Globo. In terms of audience, the final reached 12 points in Greater São Paulo for TV Globo, which represents 71% of the average obtained at the same time during the previous four weeks, a period in which the channel did not broadcast football matches. On the SporTV channel, coverage of the competition reached 12.3 million viewers, showing an 87% increase compared to the audience of the previous edition.

=== São Paulo's title ===
The result of the final was widely described by the press as "epic", "heroic" and "historic", due to São Paulo's reaction, which managed to reverse the opponent's two-goal deficit, winning 3-2. GE portal contributor Marco Condez described São Paulo's campaign as "flawless", highlighting their eight wins and one draw, with 21 goals scored and only four conceded. Condez emphasized the team's collective balance and resilience, as well as highlighting the hybrid tactical scheme, which combines characteristics of vertical and controlling play simultaneously.
