= Copa do Brasil Sub-20 =

- Founded: 2012
- Region: Brazil
- Teams: 32
- Current champions: São Paulo (5th title)
- Most championships: São Paulo (5 titles)
- Broadcaster(s): ESPN Brasil; SporTV

The Copa do Brasil Sub-20 (English: Brazil Under-20 Cup) is a Brazilian football competition run by the Brazilian Football Confederation for under–20 teams. The first edition was played from October 2012 to December of the same year.

== Finals ==
Year	Champion	Runner-up	First leg	Second leg	Aggregate score
2012	Vitória	Atlético Mineiro	4–1	1–2	5–3
2013	Santos	Criciúma	2–0	1–3	3–3 (a)
2014	Internacional	Vitória	2–1	2–1	4–2
2015	São Paulo	Atlético Paranaense	2–0	2–0	4–0
2016	São Paulo	Bahia	3–1	2–2	5–3
2017	Atlético Mineiro	Flamengo	1–1	0–0	1–1 (3–1 p)
2018	São Paulo	Corinthians	1–2	4–0	5–2
2019	Palmeiras	Cruzeiro	2–1	3–4	5–5 (4–1 p)
2020	Vasco da Gama	Bahia	2–1	3–3	5–4
2021	Coritiba	Botafogo	1–1	1–1	2–2 (6–5 p)
2022	Palmeiras	Flamengo	0–0	—N/a	0–0 (4–2 p)
2023	Cruzeiro	Gremio	2–0	—N/a	2–0
2024	São Paulo	Palmeiras	3–2	—N/a	3–2
2025	São Paulo	América Mineiro	2–1	—N/a	2–1

== Winners and runners-up ==
Club	Wins	Year	Runners-up	Year
São Paulo	5	2015, 2016, 2018, 2024, 2025	0	
Palmeiras	2	2019, 2022	1	2024
Vitória	1	2012	1	2014
Atlético Mineiro	1	2017	1	2012
Cruzeiro	1	2023	1	2019
Santos	1	2013	0	
Internacional	1	2014	0	
Vasco da Gama	1	2020	0	
Coritiba	1	2021	0	
Flamengo	0		2	2017, 2022
Criciúma	0		1	2013
Atlético Paranaense	0		1	2015
Bahia	0		1	2016
Corinthians	0		1	2018
Botafogo	0		1	2021
Gremio	0		1	2023
América Mineiro	0		1	2025
