= 2020 São Paulo FC season =

São Paulo
2020 season
- Chairman: Carlos Augusto de Barros e Silva (Leco) (until 31 December 2020); Julio Casares (from 1 January 2021)
- Manager: Fernando Diniz (until 1 February 2021); Marcos Vizolli (caretaker, until 25 February 2021)
- Stadium: Estádio do Morumbi
- Série A: 4th
- Campeonato Paulista: Quarter-finals
- Copa Libertadores: Group stage
- Copa do Brasil: Semi-finals
- Copa Sudamericana: Second stage
- Top goalscorer: League: Luciano (18 goals); All: Brenner (22 goals)
Home colours	Away colours	Third colours

The 2020 season was São Paulo's 91st season in the club's history and their 60th in the top-flight of Brazilian football. São Paulo competed in six competitions: the Série A, the Campeonato Paulista, the Copa Libertadores, the Copa Sudamericana, and the Copa do Brasil.

== Players ==
=== Current squad ===
As of 5 February 2021

Note: Flags indicate national team as defined under FIFA eligibility rules; some limited exceptions apply. Players may hold more than one non-FIFA nationality.

No.	Pos.	Nation	Player
1	GK	BRA	Tiago Volpi
2	DF	BRA	Igor Vinícius
3	DF	BRA	Bruno Alves
4	DF	BRA	Diego Costa
5	DF	ECU	Robert Arboleda
6	DF	BRA	Reinaldo
7	FW	BRA	Paulinho Bóia
8	MF	BRA	Tchê Tchê
9	FW	BRA	Pablo
10	MF	BRA	Dani Alves (captain)
11	FW	BRA	Luciano
12	MF	BRA	Vitor Bueno
13	MF	BRA	Luan
14	MF	BRA	Liziero
15	MF	BRA	Hernanes (vice-captain)
16	DF	BRA	Léo Pelé

No.	Pos.	Nation	Player
17	FW	COL	Santiago Tréllez
18	FW	BRA	Jonas Toró
19	FW	URU	Gonzalo Carneiro
20	DF	ESP	Juanfran
21	MF	BRA	Gabriel Sara
22	FW	ECU	Joao Rojas
23	GK	BRA	Lucas Perri
25	MF	BRA	Rodrigo Nestor
26	MF	BRA	Igor Gomes
27	FW	PAR	Antonio Galeano (on loan from Rubio Ñu)
32	DF	BRA	Rodrigo
34	DF	BRA	Welington
36	DF	BRA	Patryck
40	GK	BRA	Thiago Couto
41	GK	BRA	Júnior
43	DF	BRA	Walce

== Transfers ==
=== In ===
Date	Pos.	Player	A.	Moving from	Fee	Notes	Source
11 December 2019	MF	(Brazil) Vitor Bueno	25	(Brazil) Santos	R$13 million	From loan to definitive purchase	
20 December 2019	DF	(Brazil) Igor Vinícius	22	(Brazil) Ituano	R$2 million	From loan to definitive purchase	
24 December 2019	GK	(Brazil) Tiago Volpi	29	(Mexico) Querétaro	R$21 million	From loan to definitive purchase	
18 August 2020	FW	(Brazil) Luciano	27	(Brazil) Grêmio	Free		

=== Loan returns ===
Date	Pos.	Player	A.	Moving from	Fee	Notes	Source
9 December 2019	FW	(Brazil) Paulinho	21	(Brazil) São Bento	Free		
9 December 2019	FW	(Colombia) Santiago Tréllez	29	(Brazil) Internacional	Free		
9 December 2019	FW	(Brazil) Brenner	19	(Brazil) Fluminense	Free		
27 July 2019	DF	(Brazil) Rodrigo	22	(Portugal) Portimonense	Free		

Total spending: ▼ R$36 million

=== Out ===
Date	Pos.	Player	A.	Moving to	Fee	Notes	Source
11 December 2019	FW	(Brazil) Raniel	23	(Brazil) Santos	Free	Involved in the Vitor Bueno deal	
31 December 2019	MF	(Brazil) Diego Souza	34	(Brazil) Grêmio	Free	End of contract	
31 December 2019	MF	(Brazil) Caíque	21	(Brazil) Botafogo-SP	Free	End of contract	
30 January 2020	MF	(Brazil) Felipe Araruna	23	(England) Reading	Free	After return from loan	
31 January 2020	GK	(Brazil) Lucas Paes	22	(Portugal) Vitória de Setúbal	Undisclosed	After anticipated return from loan	
5 February 2020	MF	(Brazil) Jucilei	31	(Brazil) Boavista	Free	Contract terminated	
12 February 2020	MF	(Argentina) Jonathan Gómez	30	(Brazil) Sport Recife	Undisclosed	After return from loan	
15 February 2020	FW	(Brazil) Antony	19	(Netherlands) Ajax	R$74 million (€16 million)	Can reach up to R$135 million (€29 million) in case some goals are achieved.	
31 March 2020	FW	(Brazil) Pedro Bortoluzo	23	(Portugal) Oliveirense	Free	End of contract	
31 March 2020	MF	(Brazil) Thomaz	33	(Brazil) Operário Ferroviário	Free	End of contract	
31 May 2020	MF	(Brazil) Maicosuel	33	Unattached	Free	End of contract	
16 July 2020	FW	(Brazil) Léo Natel	23	(Brazil) Corinthians	Free	End of contract	
4 August 2020	FW	(Brazil) Fabinho	20	(Brazil) Athletico-PR	Free	End of contract	
13 August 2020	DF	(Brazil) Anderson Martins	32	(Brazil) Bahia	Free	Contract terminated	
18 August 2020	FW	(Brazil) Éverton	31	(Brazil) Grêmio	Free	Involved in the Luciano deal	
19 August 2020	FW	(Brazil) Alexandre Pato	30	(United States) Orlando City	Free	Contract terminated	
5 February 2021	FW	(Brazil) Brenner	21	(United States) FC Cincinnati	R$73 million ($15 million)	Can reach up to R$80,7 million ($15 million) in case some goals are achieved.	

=== Loans out ===
Date	Pos.	Player	A.	Moving to	Fee	Notes	Source
10 December 2019	FW	(Brazil) Pedro Bortoluzo	23	(Brazil) Votuporanguense	Free		
19 December 2019	MF	(Brazil) Thomaz	33	(Brazil) Internacional de Limeira	Free		
10 January 2020	MF	(Brazil) Everton Felipe	22	(Brazil) Cruzeiro	Free	After return from loan	
10 January 2020	MF	(Brazil) Hudson	31	(Brazil) Fluminense	Free		
13 January 2020	GK	(Brazil) Jean	24	(Brazil) Atlético-GO	Free	Loan after being suspended from contract	
19 January 2020	DF	(Brazil) Weverson	19	(Brazil) Red Bull Bragantino	Free		
10 July 2020	MF	(Brazil) Everton Felipe	22	(Brazil) Atlético Goianiense	Free	After return from loan	
11 August 2020	DF	(Brazil) Lucas Kal	24	(Portugal) Nacional	R$200.000	After return from loan, with an option to buy	
5 October 2020	FW	(Brazil) Marcos Calazans	24	(Brazil) CRB	Free		
6 October 2020	MF	(Brazil) Shaylon	23	(Brazil) Goiás	Free		
9 October 2020	DF	(Brazil) Júnior Tavares	24	(Brazil) Sport Recife	Free	After return from loan	
10 November 2020	FW	(Brazil) Gabriel Novaes	21	(Brazil) Bahia	Free	After anticipated return from loan	
12 November 2020	FW	(Brazil) Helinho	20	(Brazil) Red Bull Bragantino	R$3 million	Loan with an option to buy	
19 November 2020	FW	(Brazil) Danilo Gomes	21	(Brazil) Atlético-GO	Free	After anticipated return from loan	

Total income: ▲ R$77.2 million

== Statistics ==
=== Overall ===
Games played	65 (13 Campeonato Paulista, 6 Copa do Brasil, 6 Copa Libertadores, 38 Campeonato Brasileiro, 2 Copa Sudamericana)
Games won	29 (6 Campeonato Paulista, 2 Copa do Brasil, 2 Copa Libertadores, 18 Campeonato Brasileiro, 1 Copa Sudamericana)
Games drawn	19 (3 Campeonato Paulista, 3 Copa do Brasil, 1 Copa Libertadores, 12 Campeonato Brasileiro, 0 Copa Sudamericana)
Games lost	17 (4 Campeonato Paulista, 1 Copa do Brasil, 3 Copa Libertadores, 8 Campeonato Brasileiro, 1 Copa Sudamericana)
Goals scored	110
Goals conceded	79
Goal difference	+31
Best results (goal difference)	4–0 (A) v Oeste - Campeonato Paulista - 2020.02.22; 5–1 (H) v Binacional - Copa Libertadores - 2020.10.20; 4–0 (H) v Botafogo - Campeonato Brasileiro Série A - 2020.12.09
Worst result (goal difference)	1–5 (H) v Internacional - Campeonato Brasileiro Série A - 2021.01.20
Top scorer	Brenner (22 goals)

Source: São Paulo FC

=== Goalscorers ===
In italic players who left the club during the season.

Place	Position	Nationality	Number	Name	Campeonato Paulista	Copa Libertadores	Série A	Copa do Brasil	Copa Sudamericana	Total
1	FW	(Brazil)	30	Brenner	1	2	11	6	2	22
2	FW	(Brazil)	11	Luciano	0	0	18	3	0	21
3	FW	(Brazil)	9	Pablo	6	2	2	1	1	12
4	DF	(Brazil)	6	Reinaldo	1	1	6	0	0	8
5	MF	(Brazil)	10	Dani Alves	4	1	1	0	1	7
6	MF	(Brazil)	21	Gabriel Sara	0	0	5	0	1	6
7	FW	(Brazil)	6	Alexandre Pato	3	1	0	0	0	4
=	MF	(Brazil)	15	Hernanes	1	0	3	0	0	4
=	MF	(Brazil)	26	Igor Gomes	0	1	3	0	0	4
=	MF	(Brazil)	8	Tchê Tchê	0	0	4	0	0	4
=	MF	(Brazil)	12	Vitor Bueno	1	1	2	0	0	4
8	DF	(Ecuador)	6	Robert Arboleda	1	1	1	0	0	3
9	DF	(Brazil)	4	Diego Costa	0	1	1	0	0	2
10	FW	(Brazil)	22	Éverton	1	0	0	0	0	1
=	FW	(Uruguay)	19	Gonzalo Carneiro	0	0	1	0	0	1
=	FW	(Brazil)	37	Helinho	1	0	0	0	0	1
=	FW	(Brazil)	7	Paulinho	1	0	0	0	0	1
=	FW	(Colombia)	17	Santiago Tréllez	0	1	0	0	0	1
=	FW	(Brazil)	18	Jonas Toró	0	0	1	0	0	1
					0	2	0	0	1	3
				Total	21	14	59	10	6	110

=== Assists ===
In italic players who left the club during the season.

Place	Position	Nationality	Number	Name	Campeonato Paulista	Copa Libertadores	Série A	Copa do Brasil	Copa Sudamericana	Total
1	DF	(Brazil)	6	Reinaldo	2	2	7	1	0	12
2	MF	(Brazil)	10	Dani Alves	2	0	3	1	2	8
3	MF	(Brazil)	12	Vitor Bueno	4	1	2	0	0	7
4	FW	(Brazil)	11	Luciano	0	0	2	2	2	6
=	FW	(Brazil)	9	Pablo	3	1	2	0	0	6
5	MF	(Brazil)	21	Gabriel Sara	0	0	3	1	0	4
6	FW	(Brazil)	30	Brenner	0	1	2	0	0	3
=	MF	(Brazil)	26	Igor Gomes	0	1	1	1	0	3
=	DF	(Brazil)	2	Igor Vinícius	0	0	2	1	0	3
7	FW	(Brazil)	6	Alexandre Pato	2	0	0	0	0	2
=	DF	(Spain)	20	Juanfran	0	0	2	0	0	2
=	DF	(Brazil)	16	Léo	1	0	1	0	0	2
=	MF	(Brazil)	8	Tchê Tchê	0	0	2	0	0	2
=	FW	(Brazil)	18	Jonas Toró	0	1	1	0	0	2
8	DF	(Brazil)	3	Bruno Alves	0	1	0	0	0	1
=	FW	(Uruguay)	19	Gonzalo Carneiro	0	0	1	0	0	1
=	DF	(Brazil)	4	Diego Costa	0	0	0	0	1	1
=	FW	(Brazil)	37	Helinho	0	0	1	0	0	1
=	MF	(Brazil)	13	Luan	0	0	1	0	0	1
=	FW	(Brazil)	7	Paulinho	0	1	0	0	0	1
=	GK	(Brazil)	1	Tiago Volpi	0	0	1	0	0	1
				Total	13	8	34	7	6	69

=== Managers performance ===
Name	Nationality	From	To	P	W	D	L	GF	GA	Win%
Fernando Diniz	Brazil	22 January 2020	31 January 2021	60	27	17	16	104	74	45%
Marcos Vizolli (caretaker)	Brazil	10 February 2021	25 February 2021	5	2	2	1	6	5	53%

== Competitions ==
=== Overview ===
Competition	First match	Last match	Starting round	Final position	Record							
Competition	First match	Last match	Starting round	Final position	Pld	W	D	L	GF	GA	GD	Win %
Série A	13 August 2020	25 February 2021	Matchday 1	4th	38	18	12	8	59	41	+18	47.37
Copa do Brasil	14 October 2020	30 December 2020	Round of 16	Semi-Finals	6	2	3	1	10	7	+3	33.33
Campeonato Paulista	22 January 2020	29 July 2020	Matchday 1	Quarter-Finals	13	6	3	4	21	14	+7	46.15
Copa Libertadores	5 March 2020	20 October 2020	Group stage	Group stage	6	2	1	3	14	11	+3	33.33
Copa Sudamericana	28 October 2020	4 November 2020	Second stage	Second stage	2	1	0	1	6	6	+0	50.00
Total					65	29	19	17	110	79	+31	44.62

Source: Competitions

=== Group C ===
Pos	Team	Pld	W	D	L	GF	GA	GD	Pts	Qualification or relegation
1	São Paulo	12	6	3	3	19	11	+8	21	Knockout stage
2	Mirassol	12	4	5	3	16	11	+5	17	Knockout stage
3	Inter de Limeira	12	4	2	6	8	15	−7	14	
4	Ituano	12	3	5	4	11	14	−3	14	

Source: Soccerway

==== First stage ====
22 January 1	São Paulo	2–0	Água Santa	São Paulo
21:30 (UTC−3)	Pablo 5'; Dani Alves 42'	Report		Stadium: Estádio Cícero Pompeu de Toledo (Morumbi); Attendance: 18,493; Referee: Edina Alves Batista

26 January 2	Palmeiras	0–0	São Paulo	Araraquara
16:00 (UTC−3)		Report		Stadium: Estádio Doutor Adhemar de Barros (Fonte Luminosa); Attendance: 15,173; Referee: Raphael Claus

29 January 3	Ferroviária	1–2	São Paulo	Araraquara
21:30 (UTC−3)	Felipe Ferreira 26'	Report	Hernanes 29'; Arboleda 49'	Stadium: Estádio Doutor Adhemar de Barros (Fonte Luminosa); Attendance: 10,940; Referee: Ilbert Estevam da Silva

3 February 4	São Paulo	1–1	Novorizontino	São Paulo
20:00 (UTC−3)	Brenner 85'	Report	Higor Leite 70'	Stadium: Estádio Cícero Pompeu de Toledo (Morumbi); Attendance: 14,060; Referee: Flávio Roberto Mineiro Ribeiro

9 February 5	Santo André	2–1	São Paulo	Santo André
18:00 (UTC−3)	Fernando 4'; Carlos 33'	Report	Dani Alves 61'	Stadium: Estádio Bruno José Daniel; Attendance: 6,404; Referee: Vinicius Gonçalves Dias Araujo

15 February 6	São Paulo	0–0	Corinthians	São Paulo
19:00 (UTC−3)		Report		Stadium: Estádio Cícero Pompeu de Toledo (Morumbi); Attendance: 44,208; Referee: Douglas Marques das Flores

22 February 7	Oeste	0–4	São Paulo	Barueri
16:30 (UTC−3)		Report	Dani Alves 4', 73'; Pato 66', 88' (pen.)	Stadium: Arena Barueri; Attendance: 5,466; Referee: Raphael Claus

1 March 8	São Paulo	2–1	Ponte Preta	São Paulo
16:00 (UTC−3)	Pato 8'; Reinaldo 45'	Report	Dawhan 71'	Stadium: Estádio Cícero Pompeu de Toledo (Morumbi); Attendance: 21,748; Referee: Vinícius Furlan

8 March 9	Botafogo	1–0	São Paulo	Ribeirão Preto
16:00 (UTC−3)	Didi 73'	Report		Stadium: Arena Eurobike; Attendance: 11,048; Referee: Flavio Rodrigues de Souza

14 March 10	São Paulo	2–1	Santos	São Paulo
19:00 (UTC−3)	Pablo 52', 67'	Report	Arthur Gomes 29'	Stadium: Estádio Cícero Pompeu de Toledo (Morumbi); Attendance: 0 Referee: Luiz Flavio de Oliveira

23 July 11	São Paulo	2–3	Red Bull Bragantino	São Paulo
20:00 (UTC−3)	Pablo 6', 38'	Report	Matheus Jesus 12'; Morato 34'; Artur 65'	Stadium: Estádio Cícero Pompeu de Toledo (Morumbi); Attendance: 0 Referee: Edina Alves Batista

26 July 12	Guarani	1–3	São Paulo	Santos
16:00 (UTC−3)	Rafael Costa 44'	Report	Éverton 11'; Helinho 47'; Paulinho Bóia 67'	Stadium: Estádio Urbano Caldeira (Vila Belmiro); Attendance: 0 Referee: Salim Fende Chavez

==== Quarterfinal ====
29 July Single match	São Paulo	2–3	Mirassol	São Paulo
19:00 (UTC−3)	Pablo 35'; Vitor Bueno 36'	Report	Zé Roberto 19', 31'; Daniel Borges 79'	Stadium: Estádio Cícero Pompeu de Toledo (Morumbi); Attendance: 0 Referee: Flavio Rodrigues de Souza

==== Record ====
Final Position	Points	Matches	Wins	Draws	Losses	Goals For	Goals Away	Win%
6th	21	13	6	3	4	21	14	54%

=== Copa Libertadores ===
==== Group stage ====
Pos	Team	Pld	W	D	L	GF	GA	GD	Pts	Qualification
1	(Argentina) River Plate	6	4	1	1	21	6	+15	13	Round of 16
2	(Ecuador) LDU Quito	6	4	0	2	12	8	+4	12	Round of 16
3	(Brazil) São Paulo	6	2	1	3	14	11	+3	7	Copa Sudamericana
4	(Peru) Binacional	6	1	0	5	3	25	−22	3	

Source: CONMEBOL

5 March 1	Binacional (Peru)	2–1	(Brazil) São Paulo	Juliaca, Peru
19:00 (UTC−5)	Rodríguez 50'; Arango 77'	Report	Pato 20'	Stadium: Guillermo Briceño Rosamedina; Referee: José Méndez (Paraguay)

11 March 2	São Paulo (Brazil)	3–0	(Ecuador) LDU Quito	São Paulo, Brazil
21:30 (UTC−3)	Reinaldo 14' (pen.); Dani Alves 15'; Igor Gomes 61'	Report		Stadium: Estádio Cícero Pompeu de Toledo (Morumbi); Attendance: 39,107; Referee: Esteban Ostojich (Uruguay)

17 September 3	São Paulo (Brazil)	2–2	(Argentina) River Plate	São Paulo, Brazil
19:00 (UTC−3)	Pérez 10' (o.g.); Angileri 82' (o.g.)	Report	Borré 17'; Álvarez 79'	Stadium: Estádio Cícero Pompeu de Toledo (Morumbi); Attendance: 0 Referee: Esteban Ostojich (Uruguay)

22 September 4	LDU Quito (Ecuador)	4–2	(Brazil) São Paulo	Quito, Ecuador
19:30 (UTC−5)	Martínez Borja 21'; Julio 36', 45+1'; Arce 76'	Report	Brenner 60'; Tréllez 82'	Stadium: Estadio Rodrigo Paz Delgado; Attendance: 0 Referee: Wilmar Roldan (Colombia)

30 September 5	River Plate (Argentina)	2–1	(Brazil) São Paulo	Avellaneda, Argentina
21:30 (UTC−3)	Álvarez 11', 37'	Report	Diego Costa 26'	Stadium: Estadio Libertadores de América; Attendance: 0 Referee: Cristian Garay (Chile)

20 October 6	São Paulo (Brazil)	5–1	(Peru) Binacional	São Paulo, Brazil
21:30 (UTC−3)	Vitor Bueno 6'; Brenner 35'; Pablo 50', 84'; Arboleda 52'	Report	Deza 39'	Stadium: Estádio Cícero Pompeu de Toledo (Morumbi); Attendance: 0 Referee: Facundo Tello (Aregentina)

==== Record ====
Final Position	Points	Matches	Wins	Draws	Losses	Goals For	Goals Away	Win%
18th	7	6	2	1	3	14	11	39%

=== Campeonato Brasileiro Série A ===
Pos	Team	Pld	W	D	L	GF	GA	GD	Pts	Qualification or relegation
2	Internacional	38	20	10	8	61	35	+26	70	Qualification for Copa Libertadores group stage
3	Atlético Mineiro	38	20	8	10	64	45	+19	68	Qualification for Copa Libertadores group stage
4	São Paulo	38	18	12	8	59	41	+18	66	Qualification for Copa Libertadores group stage
5	Fluminense	38	18	10	10	55	42	+13	64	Qualification for Copa Libertadores group stage
6	Grêmio	38	14	17	7	53	40	+13	59	Qualification for Copa Libertadores second stage

Source: CBF
Rules for classification: 1) points; 2) wins; 3) goal difference; 4) goals scored; 5) head-to-head results (only between 2 teams); 6) fewest red cards; 7) fewest yellow cards; 8) draw.

==== Results summary ====
Overall								Home						Away					
Pld	W	D	L	GF	GA	GD	Pts	W	D	L	GF	GA	GD	W	D	L	GF	GA	GD
37	17	12	8	59	41	+18	63	10	7	2	32	16	+16	7	5	6	27	25	+2

==== Results by round ====
13 August 2	São Paulo	1–0	Fortaleza	São Paulo
19:15 (UTC−3)	Dani Alves 43'	Report		Stadium: Estádio Cícero Pompeu de Toledo (Morumbi); Attendance: 0 Referee: Leandro Pedro Vuaden

16 August 3	Vasco da Gama	2–1	São Paulo	Rio de Janeiro
16:00 (UTC−3)	Cano 61', 74'	Report	Reinaldo 90+6' (pen.)	Stadium: Estádio Vasco da Gama (São Januário); Attendance: 0 Referee: Wilton Pereira Sampaio

20 August 4	São Paulo	1–1	Bahia	São Paulo
20:00 (UTC−3)	Luciano 84'	Report	Rossi 20'	Stadium: Estádio Cícero Pompeu de Toledo (Morumbi); Attendance: 0 Referee: Rodrigo Carvalhaes de Miranda

23 August 5	Sport	0–1	São Paulo	Recife
19:00 (UTC−3)		Report	Pablo 5'	Stadium: Estádio Adelmar da Costa Carvalho (Ilha do Retiro); Attendance: 0 Referee: Rodrigo Dalonso Ferreira

26 August 11*	São Paulo	1–0	Athletico Paranaense	São Paulo
19:00 (UTC−3)	Luciano 66'	Report		Stadium: Estádio Cícero Pompeu de Toledo (Morumbi); Attendance: 0 Referee: Marcelo de Lima Henrique

30 August 6	São Paulo	2–1	Corinthians	São Paulo
11:00 (UTC−3)	Hernanes 14'; Brenner 90+2'	Report	Ramiro 36'	Stadium: Estádio Cícero Pompeu de Toledo (Morumbi); Attendance: 0 Referee: Flávio Rodrigues de Souza

3 September 7	Atlético Mineiro	3–0	São Paulo	Belo Horizonte
20:00 (UTC−3)	Alan Franco 34', 44'; Jair 58'	Report		Stadium: Estádio Governador Magalhães Pinto (Mineirão); Attendance: 0 Referee: Jean Pierre Gonçalves Lima

6 September 8	São Paulo	3–1	Fluminense	São Paulo
16:00 (UTC−3)	Brenner 50'; Luciano 53'; Vitor Bueno 90+2'	Report	Wellington Silva 39'	Stadium: Estádio Cícero Pompeu de Toledo (Morumbi); Attendance: 0 Referee: Paulo Roberto Alves Júnior

9 September 9	São Paulo	1–1	Red Bull Bragantino	São Paulo
19:15 (UTC−3)	Luciano 77'	Report	Raul 52'	Stadium: Estádio Cícero Pompeu de Toledo (Morumbi); Attendance: 0 Referee: Sávio Pereira Sampaio

12 September 10	Santos	2–2	São Paulo	Santos
19:00 (UTC−3)	Madson 29'; Marinho 90+1'	Report	Gabriel Sara 7', 37'	Stadium: Estádio Urbano Caldeira (Vila Belmiro); Attendance: 0 Referee: Luiz Flavio de Oliveira

26 September 12	Internacional	1–1	São Paulo	Porto Alegre
19:00 (UTC−3)	Thiago Galhardo 19'	Report	Luciano 24'	Stadium: Estádio José Pinheiro Borda (Beira-Rio); Attendance: 0 Referee: Marcelo de Lima Henrique

4 October 13	Coritiba	1–1	São Paulo	Curitiba
16:00 (UTC−3)	Robson 5'	Report	Reinaldo 69' (pen.)	Stadium: Estádio Major Antônio Couto Pereira (Couto Pereira); Attendance: 0 Referee: Wagner do Nascimento Magalhães

7 October 14	São Paulo	3–0	Atlético Goianiense	São Paulo
20:30 (UTC−3)	Brenner 46', 71'; Gabriel Sara 65'	Report		Stadium: Estádio Cícero Pompeu de Toledo (Morumbi); Attendance: 0 Referee: Dyorgines Jose Padovani de Andrade

10 October 15	Palmeiras	0–2	São Paulo	São Paulo
19:00 (UTC−3)		Report	Reinaldo 55' (pen.); Vitor Bueno 90+2'	Stadium: Allianz Parque; Attendance: 0 Referee: Leandro Vuaden

17 October 17	São Paulo	0–0	Grêmio	São Paulo
21:00 (UTC−3)		Report		Stadium: Estádio Cícero Pompeu de Toledo (Morumbi); Attendance: 0 Referee: Rafael Traci

1 November 19	Flamengo	1–4	São Paulo	Rio de Janeiro
16:00 (UTC−3)	Pedro 5'	Report	Tchê Tchê 16'; Brenner 45'; Reinaldo 58' (pen.); Luciano 81'	Stadium: Estádio Jornalista Mário Filho (Maracanã); Attendance: 0 Referee: Caio Augusto Max Ribeiro

7 November 20	São Paulo	2–1	Goiás	São Paulo
19:00 (UTC−3)	Brenner 23'; Igor Gomes 78'	Report	Fernandão 18'	Stadium: Estádio Cícero Pompeu de Toledo (Morumbi); Attendance: 0 Referee: Gilberto Rodrigues Castro Junior

14 November 21	Fortaleza	2–3	São Paulo	Fortaleza
19:00 (UTC−3)	David 10'; Wellington Paulista 73'	Report	Gabriel Sara 39'; Luciano 60', 80'	Stadium: Estádio Governador Plácido Castelo (Castelão); Attendance: 0 Referee: Marcelo de Lima Henrique

22 November 22	São Paulo	1–1	Vasco da Gama	São Paulo
16:00 (UTC−3)	Luciano 32'	Report	Cano 18'	Stadium: Estádio Cícero Pompeu de Toledo (Morumbi); Attendance: 0 Referee: Braulio da Silva Machado

25 November 16	Ceará	1–1	São Paulo	Fortaleza
19:15 (UTC−3)	Léo Chú 47'	Report	Diego Costa 10'	Stadium: Estádio Governador Plácido Castelo (Castelão); Attendance: 0 Referee: Wagner do Nascimento Magalhães

28 November 23	Bahia	1–3	São Paulo	Salvador
19:00 (UTC−3)	Clayson 80'	Report	Luciano 51', 74'; Arboleda 60'	Stadium: Complexo Esportivo Cultural Octávio Mangabeira (Arena Fonte Nova); Attendance: 0 Referee: Leandro Pedro Vuaden

3 December 1	Goiás	0–3	São Paulo	Goiânia
19:00 (UTC−3)		Report	Igor Gomes 18'; Brenner 48'; Hernanes 82'	Stadium: Estádio Hailé Pinheiro (Serrinha); Attendance: 0 Referee: Caio Max Augusto Vieira

6 December 24	São Paulo	1–0	Sport	São Paulo
16:00 (UTC−3)	Luciano 12'	Report		Stadium: Estádio Cícero Pompeu de Toledo (Morumbi); Attendance: 0 Referee: Felipe Fernandes de Lima

9 December 18	São Paulo	4–0	Botafogo	São Paulo
21:30 (UTC−3)	Brenner 9', 26'; Reinaldo 45+2' (pen.); Hernanes 89'	Report		Stadium: Estádio Cícero Pompeu de Toledo (Morumbi); Attendance: 0 Referee: Ricardo Marques Ribeiro

13 December 25	Corinthians	1–0	São Paulo	São Paulo
18:15 (UTC−3)	Otero 24'	Report		Stadium: Neo Química Arena (Itaquerão); Attendance: 0 Referee: Raphael Claus

16 December 26	São Paulo	3–0	Atlético Mineiro	São Paulo
21:30 (UTC−3)	Igor Gomes 24'; Gabriel Sara 83'; Jonas Toró 90+1'	Report		Stadium: Estádio Cícero Pompeu de Toledo (Morumbi); Attendance: 0 Referee: Wilton Pereira Sampaio

26 December 27	Fluminense	1–2	São Paulo	Rio de Janeiro
21:00 (UTC−3)	Fred 51'	Report	Brenner 14', 71'	Stadium: Estádio Jornalista Mário Filho (Maracanã); Attendance: 0 Referee: Anderson Daronco

6 January 2021 28	Red Bull Bragantino	4–2	São Paulo	Bragança Paulista
21:30 (UTC−3)	Claudinho 3'; Raul 13'; Fabrício Bruno 17'; Artur 44'	Report	Tchê Tchê 16'; Carneiro 90+6'	Stadium: Estádio Nabi Abi Chedid (Nabizão); Attendance: 0 Referee: Luiz Flavio de Oliveira

10 January 2021 29	São Paulo	0–1	Santos	São Paulo
16:00 (UTC−3)		Report	Jobson 46'	Stadium: Estádio Cícero Pompeu de Toledo (Morumbi); Attendance: 0 Referee: Bráulio da Silva Machado

17 January 2021 30	Athletico Paranaense	1–1	São Paulo	Curitiba
16:00 (UTC−3)	Renato Kayzer 39'	Report	Tchê Tchê 61'	Stadium: Estádio Joaquim Américo Guimarães (Arena da Baixada); Attendance: 0 Referee: Wilton Pereira Sampaio

20 January 2021 31	São Paulo	1–5	Internacional	São Paulo
21:30 (UTC−3)	Luciano 36'	Report	Cuesta 8'; Caio Vidal 24'; Yuri Alberto 60', 66', 68'	Stadium: Estádio Cícero Pompeu de Toledo (Morumbi); Attendance: 0 Referee: Marcelo de Lima Henrique

23 January 2021 32	São Paulo	1–1	Coritiba	São Paulo
19:00 (UTC−3)	Luciano 58'	Report	Sarrafiore 81'	Stadium: Estádio Cícero Pompeu de Toledo (Morumbi); Attendance: 0 Referee: Rodrigo Dalonso Ferreira

31 January 2021 33	Atlético Goianiense	2–1	São Paulo	Goiânia
16:00 (UTC−3)	Natanael 21'; Vitor Leque 88'	Report	Reinaldo 40'	Stadium: Estádio Antônio Accioly (Castelo do Dragão); Attendance: 0 Referee: Braulio da Silva Machado

10 February 2021 35	São Paulo	1–1	Ceará	São Paulo
21:00 (UTC−3)	Luciano 90+7'	Report	Léo Chú 90+3'	Stadium: Estádio Cícero Pompeu de Toledo (Morumbi); Attendance: 0 Referee: Savio Pereira Sampaio

14 February 2021 36	Grêmio	1–2	São Paulo	Porto Alegre
20:30 (UTC−3)	Diego Souza 33'	Report	Tchê Tchê 62'; Luciano 67'	Stadium: Arena do Grêmio; Attendance: 0 Referee: Paulo Roberto Alves Junior

19 February 2021 34	São Paulo	1–1	Palmeiras	São Paulo
21:30 (UTC−3)	Luciano 73' (pen.)	Report	Rony 90+2'	Stadium: Estádio Cícero Pompeu de Toledo (Morumbi); Attendance: 0 Referee: Leandro Pedro Vuaden

22 February 2021 37	Botafogo	1–0	São Paulo	Rio de Janeiro
20:00 (UTC−3)	Matheus Babi 57'	Report		Stadium: Estádio Olímpico Nilton Santos (Engenhão); Attendance: 0 Referee: Braulio da Silva Machado

25 February 2021 38	São Paulo	2–1	Flamengo	São Paulo
21:30 (UTC−3)	Luciano 45+3'; Pablo 58'	Report	Bruno Henrique 50'	Stadium: Estádio Cícero Pompeu de Toledo (Morumbi); Attendance: 0 Referee: Rodolpho Toski Marques

=== Copa do Brasil ===
==== Round of 16 ====
14 October First leg	Fortaleza	3–3	São Paulo	Fortaleza
19:15 (UTC−3)	David 5'; Tinga 21'; Gabriel Dias 65'	Report	Brenner 16', 90+4'; Luciano 44'	Stadium: Estádio Governador Plácido Castelo (Castelão); Attendance: 0 Referee: Rodolpho Toski Marques

25 October Second leg	São Paulo	2–2 (5–5 agg.) (10–9 p)	Fortaleza	São Paulo
20:30 (UTC−3)	Brenner 10', 71'	Report	David 80'; Roger Carvalho 90+1'	Stadium: Estádio Cícero Pompeu de Toledo (Morumbi); Attendance: 0 Referee: Leandro Pedro Vuaden
	Penalties
	Reinaldo (penalty scored); Tchê Tchê (penalty scored); Dani Alves (penalty scored); Pablo (penalty scored); Vitor Bueno (penalty scored); Tiago Volpi (penalty scored); Bruno Alves (penalty scored); Arboleda (penalty scored); Diego Costa (penalty scored); Léo Pelé (penalty scored)		(penalty scored) Juninho; (penalty scored) Wellington Paulista; (penalty scored) Bruno Melo; (penalty scored) Marlon; (penalty scored) Max Walef; (penalty scored) Yuri César; (penalty scored) Paulão; (penalty scored) Osvaldo; (penalty scored) Roger Carvalho; (penalty missed) Gabriel Dias

==== Quarter-finals ====
11 November First leg	Flamengo	1–2	São Paulo	Rio de Janeiro
21:30 (UTC−3)	Gabriel 48'	Report	Brenner 46', 87'	Stadium: Estádio Jornalista Mário Filho (Maracanã); Attendance: 0 Referee: Anderson Daronco

18 November Second leg	São Paulo	3–0 (5–1 agg.)	Flamengo	São Paulo
21:30 (UTC−3)	Luciano 46', 55'; Pablo 84'	Report		Stadium: Estádio Cícero Pompeu de Toledo (Morumbi); Attendance: 0 Referee: Wilton Pereira Sampaio

==== Semi-finals ====
23 December First leg	Grêmio	1–0	São Paulo	Porto Alegre
21:30 (UTC−3)	Diego Souza 62'	Report		Stadium: Arena do Grêmio; Attendance: 0 Referee: Marcelo de Lima Henrique

30 December Second leg	São Paulo	0–0 (0–1 agg.)	Grêmio	São Paulo
21:30 (UTC−3)		Report		Stadium: Estádio Cícero Pompeu de Toledo (Morumbi); Attendance: 0 Referee: Bruno Arleu de Araújo

=== Copa Sudamericana ===
==== Second stage ====
28 October First leg	Lanús (Argentina)	3–2	(Brazil) São Paulo	Lanús
19:15 (UTC−3)	José Sand 52', 83'; Facundo Quignon 90'	Report	Brenner 12', 86'	Stadium: Estadio Ciudad de Lanús; Attendance: 0 Referee: Chrystian Ferreyra (Uruguay)

4 November Second leg	São Paulo (Brazil)	4–3 (6–6 (a) agg.)	(Argentina) Lanús	São Paulo
19:15 (UTC−3)	Dani Alves 26'; Pablo 61'; Thaller 87' (o.g.); Gabriel Sara 90'	Report	De la Vega 17'; Aguirre 43'; Orsini 90+3'	Stadium: Estádio Cícero Pompeu de Toledo (Morumbi); Attendance: 0 Referee: Alexis Herrera (Venezuela)
