= List of SE Palmeiras seasons =

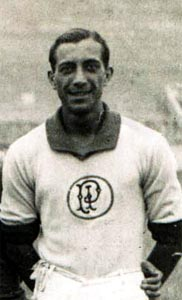
Oscar Francisco Nascimento (1930)

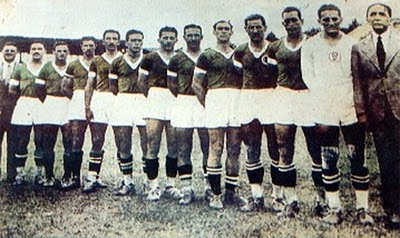
Photo of Palestra Italia State Champion in 1940

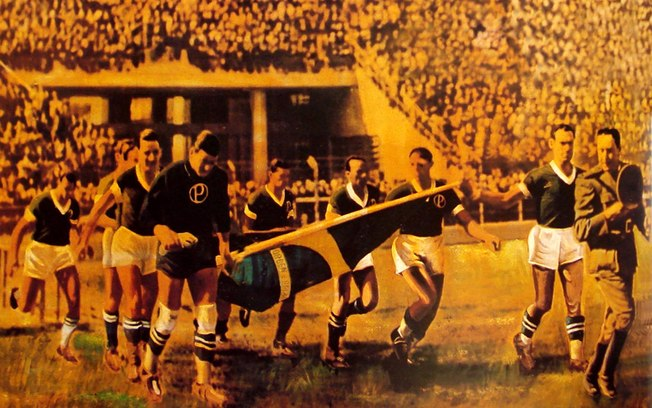
Palmeiras in 1942

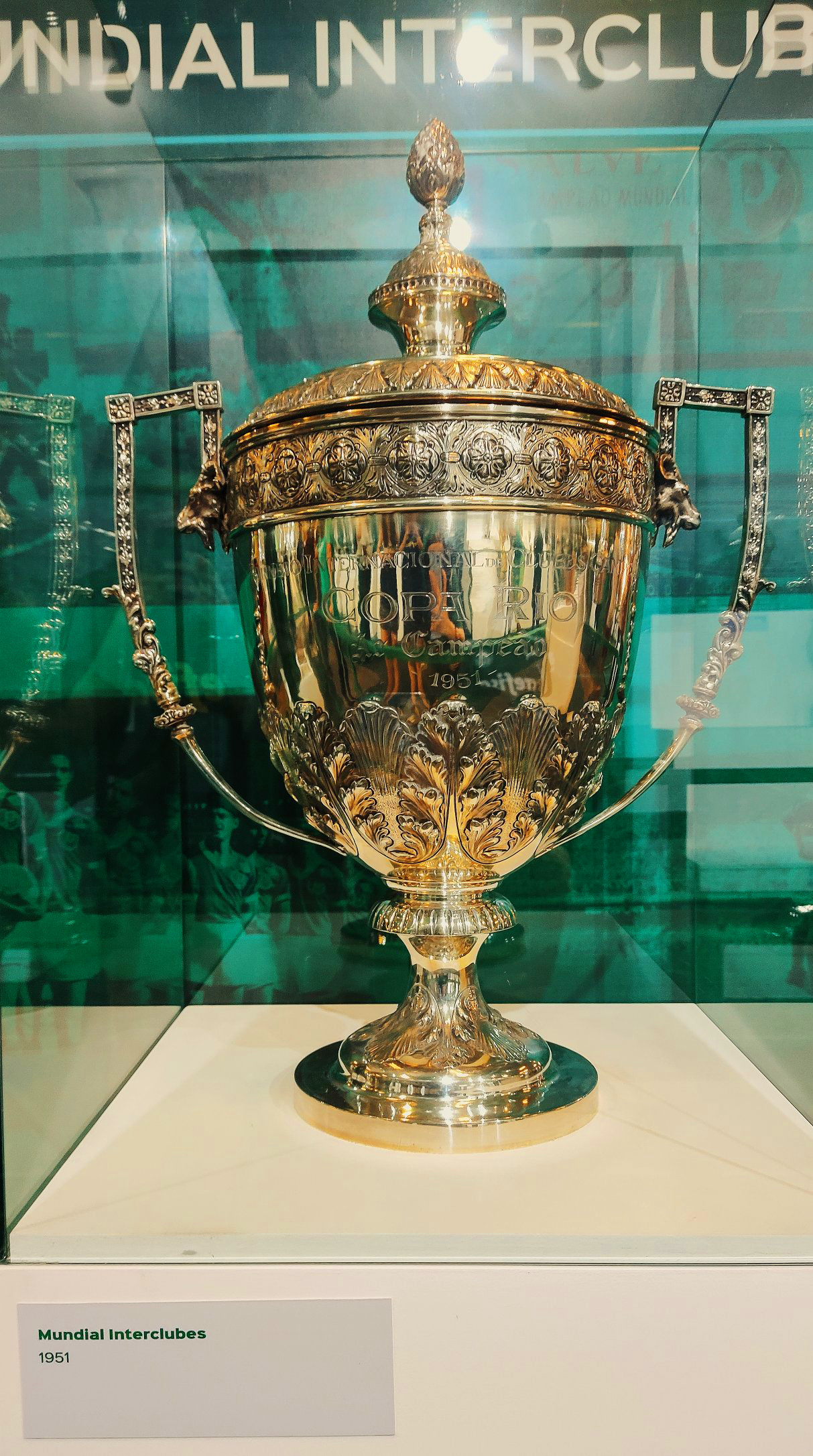
Copa Rio 1951 trophy

Sociedade Esportiva Palmeiras is a Brazilian professional football club based in São Paulo, Brazil. The club was formed in 1914.

Palmeiras has won 16 national competitions, which makes it the most successful club inside Brazil. The club's most important titles are 1 Intercontinental World Club Tournament (Copa Rio), 3 Copa Libertadores, 12 Brazilian National Leagues (Campeonato Brasileiro Série A), 4 Brazil Cups (Copa do Brasil), 1 Champions Cup (Copa dos Campeões), 1 (Supercopa do Brasil) 1 (Recopa Sudamericana) and 1 South American Cup (Copa Mercosul), as well as 5 Interstate titles (Torneio Rio – São Paulo), 26 State Championship titles (Campeonato Paulista), 2 Extra State Championship titles (Campeonato Paulista Extra) and 3 Ramón de Carranza Trophy titles.

== Seasons ==
=== Campeonato Paulista positions – 1902-present ===
Year	Position	Year	Position	Year	Position	Year	Position	Year	Position	Year	Position	Year	Position
1902	–	1922	2nd	1942	1st	1962	4th	1982	3rd	2002	–	2022	1st
1903	–	1923	2nd	1943	3rd	1963	1st	1983	4th	2003	4th	2023	1st
1904	–	1924	12th	1944	1st	1964	2nd	1984	4th	2004	4th	2024	1st
1905	–	1925	5th	1945	3rd	1965	2nd	1985	7th	2005	9th	2025	2nd
1906	–	1926	1st^{¹;} –^{²}	1946	5th	1966	1st	1986	2nd	2006	3rd	2026	1st
1907	–	1927	1st^{¹;} –^{²}	1947	1st	1967	4th	1987	4th	2007	5th		
1908	–	1928	3rd^{¹;} –^{²}	1948	6th	1968	11th	1988	6th	2008	1st		
1909	–	1929	3rd^{¹;} –^{²}	1949	2nd	1969	2nd	1989	7th	2009	3rd		
1910	–	1930	3rd	1950	1st	1970	2nd	1990	4th	2010	11th		
1911	–	1931	2nd	1951	2nd	1971	2nd	1991	3rd	2011	3rd		
1912	–	1932	1st	1952	4th	1972	1st	1992	2nd	2012	6th		
1913	–^{¹;} –^{²}	1933	1st	1953	2nd	1973	2nd	1993	1st	2013	6th		
1914	–^{¹;} –^{²}	1934	1st	1954	2nd	1974	1st	1994	1st	2014	3rd		
1915	–^{¹;} –^{²}	1935	–^{¹;} 2nd^{²}	1955	4th	1975	3rd	1995	2nd	2015	2nd		
1916	6th^{¹;} –^{²}	1936	–^{¹;} 1st^{²}	1956	4th	1976	1st	1996	1st	2016	4th		
1917	2nd	1937	2nd	1957	4th	1977	3rd	1997	4th	2017	3rd		
1918	10th	1938	4th	1958	4th	1978	4th	1998	4th	2018	2nd		
1919	2nd	1939	2nd	1959	1st	1979	3rd	1999	2nd	2019	3rd		
1920	1st	1940	1st	1960	4th	1980	16th	2000	4th	2020	1st		
1921	2nd	1941	3rd	1961	2nd	1981	4th	2001	7th	2021	2nd		

=== Campeonato Paulista Extra positions – 1926-1938 ===
Year	Position
1926	1st
1938	1st

=== Supercampeonato Paulista position – 2002 ===
Year	Position
2002	4th

=== Torneio Rio-São Paulo positions – 1933-2002 ===
Year	Position	Year	Position	Year	Position
1933	1st	1959	4th	1998	3rd
1940	4th	1960	6th	1999	7th
1950	4th	1961	4th	2000	1st
1951	1st	1962	3rd	2001	6th
1952	8th	1963	5th	2002	3rd
1953	7th	1964	3rd		
1954	3rd	1965	1st		
1955	2nd	1966	6th		
1957	8th	1993	1st		
1958	8th	1997	3rd		

=== Torneio Quinela de Ouro position – 1942 ===
Year	Position
1942	3rd

=== Torneio Rio-São Paulo (Início) position – 1951 ===
Year	Position
1951	8th

=== Torneio João Havelange position – 1993 ===
Year	Position
1993	4th

=== Campeonato Brasileiro Série A positions – 1959-present ===
Year	Position	Year	Position	Year	Position	Year	Position	Year	Position	Year	Position	Year	Position
1959	–	1969	1st	1979	4th	1989	5th	1999	10th	2009	5th	2019	3rd
1960	1st	1970	2nd	1980	13th	1990	6th	2000	6th	2010	10th	2020	7th
1961	5th	1971	7th	1981	31st	1991	6th	2001	12th	2011	11th	2021	3rd
1962	–	1972	1st	1982	–	1992	11th	2002	24th	2012	18th	2022	1st
1963	–	1973	1st	1983	9th	1993	1st	2003	–	2013	–	2023	1st
1964	4th	1974	11th	1984	20th	1994	1st	2004	4th	2014	16th	2024	2nd
1965	4th	1975	9th	1985	24th	1995	5th	2005	4th	2015	9th	2025	2nd
1966	5th	1976	7th	1986	10th	1996	3rd	2006	16th	2016	1st	2026	
1967	1st^{¹} 1st^{²}	1977	6th	1987	8th	1997	2nd	2007	7th	2017	2nd		
1968	4th^{¹} –^{²}	1978	2nd	1988	16th	1998	5th	2008	4th	2018	1st		

=== Campeonato Brasileiro Série B positions – 1971-present ===
Year	Position	Year	Position	Year	Position	Year	Position	Year	Position
1971	–	1990	–	2002	–	2012	–	2022	–
1972	–	1991	–	2003	1st	2013	1st	2023	–
1980	–	1992	–	2004	–	2014	–	2024	–
1981	–	1994	–	2005	–	2015	–	2025	–
1982	33rd	1995	–	2006	–	2016	–	2026	–
1983	–	1996	–	2007	–	2017	–		
1984	–	1997	–	2008	–	2018	–		
1985	–	1998	–	2009	–	2019	–		
1988	–	1999	–	2010	–	2020	–		
1989	–	2001	–	2011	–	2021	–		

=== Copa do Brasil positions – 1989-present ===
Year	Position	Year	Position	Year	Position	Year	Position
1989	–	1999	3rd	2009	–	2019	6th
1990	–	2000	8th	2010	5th	2020	1st
1991	–	2001	–	2011	5th	2021	28th
1992	3rd	2002	33rd	2012	1st	2022	13th
1993	6th	2003	9th	2013	15th	2023	7th
1994	10th	2004	7th	2014	10th	2024	13th
1995	9th	2005	–	2015	1st	2025	14th
1996	2nd	2006	–	2016	8th	2026	
1997	3rd	2007	20th	2017	7th		
1998	1st	2008	15th	2018	3rd		

=== Supercopa do Brasil positions – 1990-present ===
Year	Position
1990	–
1991	–
2020	–
2021	2nd
2022	–
2023	1st
2024	2nd
2025	–
2026	–

=== Copa dos Campeões positions – 2000-2002 ===
Year	Position
2000	1st
2001	–
2002	4th

=== Copa Libertadores positions – 1960-present ===
Year	Position	Year	Position	Year	Position	Year	Position	Year	Position	Year	Position	Year	Position
1960	–	1970	–	1980	–	1990	–	2000	2nd	2010	–	2020	1st
1961	2nd	1971	3rd	1981	–	1991	–	2001	3rd	2011	–	2021	1st
1962	–	1972	–	1982	–	1992	–	2002	–	2012	–	2022	3rd
1963	–	1973	7th	1983	–	1993	–	2003	–	2013	15th	2023	3rd
1964	–	1974	11th	1984	–	1994	13th	2004	–	2014	–	2024	10th
1965	–	1975	–	1985	–	1995	5th	2005	10th	2015	–	2025	2nd
1966	–	1976	–	1986	–	1996	–	2006	13th	2016	18th	2026	
1967	–	1977	–	1987	–	1997	–	2007	–	2017	9th		
1968	2nd	1978	–	1988	–	1998	–	2008	–	2018	4th		
1969	–	1979	12th	1989	–	1999	1st	2009	7th	2019	5th		

=== Copa Mercosur/Copa Sudamericana positions – 1998-present ===
Year	Position	Year	Position	Year	Position
1998	1st	2008	8th	2018	–
1999	2nd	2009	–	2019	–
2000	2nd	2010	3rd	2020	–
2001	15th	2011	19th	2021	–
2002	–	2012	14th	2022	–
2003	16th	2013	–	2023	–
2004	–	2014	–	2024	–
2005	–	2015	–	2025	–
2006	–	2016	–	2026	
2007	–	2017	–		

=== Recopa Sudamericana positions – 1989-present ===
Year	Position	Year	Position	Year	Position	Year	Position
1989	–	2003	–	2013	–	2023	–
1990	–	2004	–	2014	–	2024	–
1991	–	2005	–	2015	–	2025	–
1992	–	2006	–	2016	–	2026	–
1993	–	2007	–	2017	–		
1994	–	2008	–	2018	–		
1995	–	2009	–	2019	–		
1996	–	2010	–	2020	–		
1997	–	2011	–	2021	2nd		
1998	–	2012	–	2022	1st		

=== Copa Rio/Intercontinental Cup/FIFA Club World Cup positions – 1951-present ===
Year	Position	Year	Position	Year	Position	Year	Position	Year	Position	Year	Position	Year	Position
1951	1st	1968	–	1980	–	1990	–	2000	–^{¹} –^{²}	2010	–	2020	4th
1952	–	1969	–	1981	–	1991	–	2001	–	2011	–	2021	2nd
1960	–	1970	–	1982	–	1992	–	2002	–	2012	–	2022	–
1961	–	1971	–	1983	–	1993	–	2003	–	2013	–	2023	–
1962	–	1972	–	1984	–	1994	–	2004	–	2014	–	2024	–
1963	–	1973	–	1985	–	1995	–	2005	–	2015	–	2025	–^{¹} –8th^{²}
1964	–	1974	–	1986	–	1996	–	2006	–	2016	–	2026	
1965	–	1976	–	1987	–	1997	–	2007	–	2017	–		
1966	–	1977	–	1988	–	1998	–	2008	–	2018	–		
1967	–	1979	–	1989	–	1999	2nd	2009	–	2019	–		

=== 2003–Present (Current national league format) ===
Season	Div.	Pos.	Pl.	W	D	L	GS	GA	P	Campeonato Paulista	Copa do Brasil	Supercopa do Brasil	CONMEBOL		FIFA Club World Cup	Top scorer (League)	Goals	Head coach
2003	Série B	1	23	13	8	2	54	25	47	Semi-finals	Round of 16	–	–	–	–	(Brazil) Vágner Love	19	(Brazil) Jair Picerni
2004	Série A	4	46	22	13	11	72	47	79	Semi-finals	Quarter-finals	–	–	–	–	(Brazil) Osmar	11	(Brazil) Jair Picerni (Brazil) Wilson Macarrão (Brazil) Estevam Soares
2005	Série A	4	42	20	10	12	81	65	70	9th	–	–	CL	Round of 16	–	(Brazil) Marcinho	18	(Brazil) Paulo Bonamigo (Brazil) Candinho (Brazil) Wilson Macarrão (Brazil) Emerson Leão
2006	Série A	16	38	12	8	18	58	70	44	3rd	–	–	–	–		(Brazil) Edmundo (Brazil) Paulo Baier	10	(Brazil) Emerson Leão (Brazil) Marcelo Vilar (Brazil) Tite (Brazil) Jair Picerni
2007	Série A	7	38	16	10	12	48	47	58	5th	Second Round	–	–	–	–	(Brazil) Caio	9	(Brazil) Caio Júnior
2008	Série A	4	38	19	8	11	55	45	65	Champion	Round of 16	–	CS	Quarter-finals	–	(Brazil) Alex Mineiro	18	(Brazil) Nei Pandolfo (Brazil) Vanderlei Luxemburgo
2009	Série A	5	38	17	11	10	58	45	62	Semi-Finals	–	–	CL	Quarter-finals	–	(Brazil) Obina	12	(Brazil) Vanderlei Luxemburgo (Brazil) Jorginho (Brazil) Muricy Ramalho
2010	Série A	10	38	12	14	12	42	43	50	11th	Quarter-finals	–	CS	Semi-finals	–	(Brazil) Kléber	8	(Brazil) Antônio Carlos Zago (Brazil) Parraga (Brazil) Luiz Felipe Scolari
2011	Série A	11	38	11	17	10	43	39	50	Semi-finals	Quarter-finals	–	CS	Second Round	–	(Brazil) Luan	9	(Brazil) Luiz Felipe Scolari
2012	Série A	18	38	9	7	22	39	54	34	Quarter-finals	Champion	–	CS	Round of 16	–	(Argentina) Hernán Barcos	14	(Brazil) Luiz Felipe Scolari (Brazil) Narciso (Brazil) Gilson Kleina
2013	Série B	1	38	24	7	7	71	28	79	Quarter-finals	Round of 16	–	CL	Round of 16	–	(Brazil) Alan Kardec	14	(Brazil) Gilson Kleina
2014	Série A	16	38	11	7	20	34	59	40	Semi-finals	Round of 16	–	–	–	–	(Brazil) Henrique Dourado	16	(Brazil) Gilson Kleina (Brazil) Alberto Valentim (Argentina) Ricardo Gareca (Brazil) Alberto Valentim (Brazil) Dorival Júnior
2015	Série A	9	38	15	8	15	60	51	53	Runner-up	Champion	–	–	–	–	(Brazil) Dudu	10	(Brazil) Oswaldo de Oliveira (Brazil) Alberto Valentim (Brazil) Marcelo Oliveira
2016	Série A	1	38	24	8	6	62	32	80	Semi-finals	Quarter-finals	–	CL	Group Stage	–	(Brazil) Gabriel Jesus	12	(Brazil) Marcelo Oliveira (Brazil) Alberto Valentim (Brazil) Cuca
2017	Série A	2	38	19	6	13	61	45	63	Semi-finals	Quarter-finals	–	CL	Round of 16	–	(Brazil) Dudu	9	(Brazil) Eduardo Baptista (Brazil) Cuca (Brazil) Alberto Valentim
2018	Série A	1	38	23	11	4	64	26	80	Runner-up	Semi-finals	–	CL	Semi-finals	–	(Brazil) William	10	(Brazil) Roger Machado (Brazil) Paulo Turra (Brazil) Luiz Felipe Scolari
2019	Série A	3	38	21	11	6	61	32	74	Semi-finals	Quarter-finals	–	CL	Quarter-finals	–	(Brazil) Bruno Henrique	10	(Brazil) Luiz Felipe Scolari (Brazil) Mano Menezes (Brazil) Andrey Lopes
2020	Série A	7	38	15	13	10	51	37	58	Champion	Champion	–	CL	Champion	4th	(Brazil) Raphael Veiga	11	(Brazil) Vanderlei Luxemburgo (Brazil) Andrey Lopes (Portugal) Abel Ferreira
2021	Série A	3	38	20	6	12	58	43	66	Runner-up	Third round	Runner-up	CL RS	Champion Runner-up	Runner-up	(Brazil) Raphael Veiga	10	(Portugal) Abel Ferreira
2022	Série A	1	38	23	12	3	66	27	81	Champion	Round of 16	–	CL RS	Semi-finals Champion	–	(Brazil) Rony	12	(Portugal) Abel Ferreira
2023	Série A	1	38	20	10	8	64	33	70	Champion	Quarter-finals	Champion	CL	Semi-finals	–	(Brazil) Endrick	11	(Portugal) Abel Ferreira
2024	Série A	2	38	22	7	9	60	33	73	Champion	Round of 16	Runner-up	CL	Round of 16	–	(Brazil) Estêvão	13	(Portugal) Abel Ferreira
2025	Série A	2	38	23	7	8	66	33	76	Runner-up	Round of 16	–	CL	Runner-up	Quarter-finals	(Brazil) Vitor Roque	16	(Portugal) Abel Ferreira
2026	Série A	TBD	34	21	10	3	62	23	73	Champion	Semi-finals	–	CL	Final	TBD			(Portugal) Abel Ferreira

== All-time statistics ==
=== Campeonato Paulista ===
Last updated: March 8, 2026

Titles	Games	W	D	L	GF	GA	GD	Pts
27	2560	1442	615	503	5061	2620	+2441	4941

=== Campeonato Paulista Extra ===
Titles	Games	W	D	L	GF	GA	GD	Pts
2	14	11	2	1	37	15	+22	35

=== Supercampeonato Paulista ===
Titles	Games	W	D	L	GF	GA	GD	Pts
0	2	0	1	1	2	4	-2	1

=== Torneio Rio-São Paulo ===
Titles	Games	W	D	L	GF	GA	GD	Pts
5	239	121	46	72	504	393	+111	409

=== Torneio João Havelange ===
Titles	Games	W	D	L	GF	GA	GD	Pts
0	2	0	1	1	1	4	-3	1

=== Torneio Quinela de Ouro ===
Titles	Games	W	D	L	GF	GA	GD	Pts
0	4	1	2	1	9	9	0	5

=== Torneio Início Rio-São Paulo ===
Titles	Games	W	D	L	GF	GA	GD	Pts
0	1	0	0	1	0	3	-3	0

=== Campeonato Brasileiro Série A ===
Last updated: November 5, 2026

Titles	Games	W	D	L	GF	GA	GD	Pts
12	1652	772	450	430	2468	1727	+741	2765

=== Campeonato Brasileiro Série B ===
Last updated: November 30, 2013

Titles	Games	W	D	L	GF	GA	GD	Pts
2	73	47	16	10	151	64	+87	157

=== Copa do Brasil ===
Last updated: November 1, 2026

Titles	Games	W	D	L	GF	GA	GD	Pts
4	189	108	42	39	334	176	+158	366

=== Supercopa do Brasil ===
Last updated: February 4, 2024

Titles	Games	W	D	L	GF	GA	GD	Pts
1	3	1	2	0	6	5	+1	5

=== Copa dos Campeões ===
Titles	Games	W	D	L	GF	GA	GD	Pts
1	10	6	2	2	17	10	+7	20

=== Copa Libertadores ===
Last updated: October 21, 2026

Titles	Games	W	D	L	GF	GA	GD	Pts
3	267	152	53	62	515	262	+253	509

=== Copa Mercosur/Copa Sudamericana ===
Last updated: October 23, 2012

Titles	Games	W	D	L	GF	GA	GD	Pts
1	66	35	11	20	123	82	+41	116

=== Recopa Sudamericana ===
Last updated: March 2, 2022

Titles	Games	W	D	L	GF	GA	GD	Pts
1	4	2	1	1	7	5	+2	7

=== Copa Rio/Intercontinental Cup/FIFA Club World Cup ===
Last updated: July 4, 2025

Titles	Games	W	D	L	GF	GA	GD	Pts
1	17	7	5	5	19	16	+3	26
