= Brazilian football COVID-19 protocols =

Public health measures in Brazil

The return of football in Brazil in the COVID-19 era generated a great deal of controversy domestically. In May 2020 the Football Federation of the State of Rio de Janeiro published the “Safe Return Protocol”, which was the first such guide to be released. This guide included individual, collective and managerial measures for the return of training and games with strict biosafety protocols for the conclusion of the Carioca Championship. This publication coincided with what is now known as the first wave of COVID-19 in Brazil and the proposed return was considered premature and strongly contested by the clubs and federations of other states. Additionally, in May 2020, the Fédération Internationale de Football Association (FIFA) announced a protocol for the safe return of football that includes biosafety measures for training, travel and matches. Since this time other international associations, leagues and competitions around the world have also made their protocols for safe return of football available. The Brazilian Football Confederation (CBF) made available its return booklet, called the “Medical guide of protective suggestions for the return to the activities of Brazilian football”, on 15 June 2020. Team sports are considered to be high risk activities in relation to COVID-19 due to interpersonal contact within matches without the use of protective masks at distances of less than 2 meters. As a result, specific protocols for systematic testing and biosafety measures needed to be implemented to enable the safe continuation and return of soccer. This research compares the safety protocol released by the CBF with international protocols, as well as the evaluation of the risks of SARS-CoV-2 transmission during the Brazilian Men's Championship 2020 season between August 2020 and February 2021.

Public health recommendations and government measures during the COVID-19 pandemic have enforced restrictions on daily-living. While these measures are imperative to abate the spreading of COVID-19, the impact of these restrictions on mental health and emotional wellbeing is undefined. During the COVID-19 pandemic, the life style have resulted in numerous restrictions on daily living including social distancing, isolation and home confinement. Those affected the mental health of people globally. While these measures are imperative to abate the spreading of COVID-19, the impact of these restrictions on health behaviours and lifestyles at home is undefined. In Brazil, the return of the activities was very important but the relaxation rules can represent a risk for future COVID-19 waves.
