= Alexander Lecaros =

Peruvian footballer (born 1999)

Personal information
- Full name: Alexander Lecaros Aragón
- Date of birth: 13 October 1999 (age 27)
- Place of birth: San Sebastián, Peru
- Height: 1.69 m (5 ft 7 in)
- Position: Winger

Team information
- Current team: Sampaio Corrêa-RJ

Youth career
- Real Garcilaso

Senior career*
Years	Team	Apps	(Gls)
2016–2019	Real Garcilaso	81	(2)
2020–2021	Botafogo	14	(0)
2021	→ Avaí (loan)	0	(0)
2022–2023	Carlos A. Mannucci	27	(0)
2024	Cienciano	9	(0)
2025	Comerciantes Unidos	22	(1)
2026–	Sampaio Corrêa-RJ	2	(0)
- * Club domestic league appearances and goals as of 18:11, 13 February 2020 (UTC)

Alexander Lecaros Aragón (born 13 October 1999) is a Peruvian footballer who plays as a winger for Sampaio Corrêa-RJ.

== Career statistics ==
=== Club ===
As of 16 September 2020.

Club	Season	League			State League		Cup		Continental		Other		Total	
Club	Season	Division	Apps	Goals	Apps	Goals	Apps	Goals	Apps	Goals	Apps	Goals	Apps	Goals
Real Garcilaso	2016	Primera División	23	0	–		0	0	0	0	0	0	23	0
Real Garcilaso	2017	Primera División	17	1	–		0	0	0	0	0	0	17	1
Real Garcilaso	2018	Primera División	15	0	–		0	0	1 (Note: Appearances in the Copa Libertadores)	0	0	0	16	0
Real Garcilaso	2019	Primera División	26	1	–		0	0	2	0	0	0	28	1
Real Garcilaso	Total		81	2	0	0	0	0	3	0	0	0	84	2
Botafogo	2020	Série A	0	0	2	0	0	0	0	0	0	0	2	0
Career total			81	2	2	0	0	0	3	0	0	0	86	2
