= Luciano (footballer, born 1993) =

Brazilian footballer

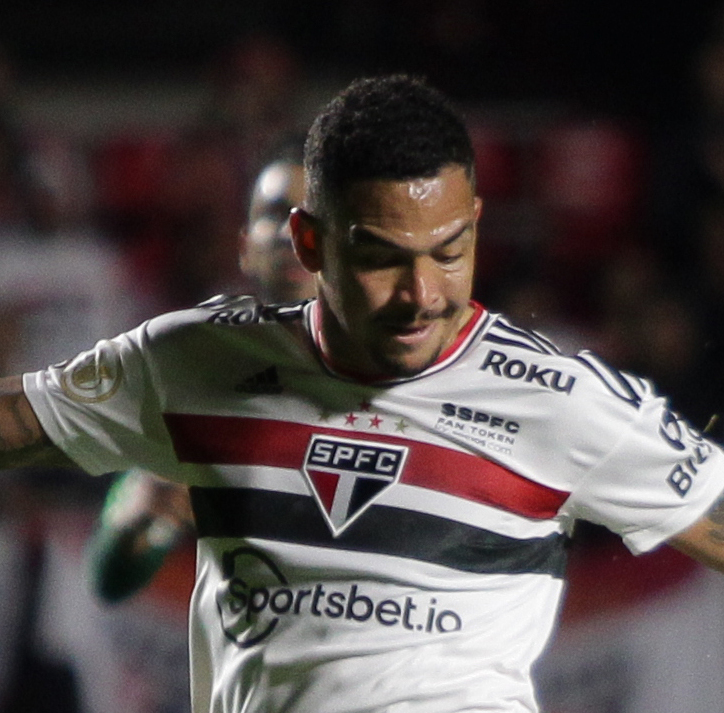
- Luciano with São Paulo in 2022

Personal information
- Full name: Luciano da Rocha Neves
- Date of birth: 18 May 1993 (age 33)
- Place of birth: Anápolis, Brazil
- Height: 1.81 m (5 ft 11 in)
- Position: Forward

Team information
- Current team: São Paulo
- Number: 10

Youth career
- 2003–2010: Anápolis
- 2010–2012: Atlético Goianiense

Senior career*
| Years | Team | Apps | (Gls) |
| 2012–2013 | Atlético Goianiense | 5 | (1) |
| 2013–2014 | Avaí | 28 | (7) |
| 2014–2017 | Corinthians | 76 | (17) |
| 2016–2017 | → Leganés (loan) | 25 | (4) |
| 2017 | → Panathinaikos (loan) | 4 | (0) |
| 2018 | Panathinaikos | 5 | (2) |
| 2018–2019 | Fluminense | 37 | (11) |
| 2019–2020 | Grêmio | 34 | (8) |
| 2020– | São Paulo | 265 | (84) |

International career^{‡}
| 2015 | Brazil U23 | 6 | (5) |
Medal record
Representing Brazil
Men's Football
Pan American Games
| Bronze medal – third place | 2015 Toronto | Team competition |
- * Club domestic league appearances and goals as of 1 October 2026 ‡ National team caps and goals as of 27 March 2016

Luciano da Rocha Neves (born 18 May 1993), simply known as Luciano, is a Brazilian professional footballer who plays as a forward for Campeonato Brasileiro Série A club São Paulo.

== Club career ==
Luciano was born in Anápolis, Goiás, and joined Atlético Goianiense's youth setup from hometown club Anápolis. He made his debut for the former on 8 March 2012, coming on as a second-half substitute for William in a 1–0 away win against Gurupi, for the year's Copa do Brasil.

Luciano made his Série A debut on 13 October 2012, coming from the bench and scoring the last in a 3–1 home win against Internacional. He contributed with five league appearances during the campaign, suffering team relegation.

In 2013 Luciano moved to Avaí in the Série B. He again made his debut with a goal, netting his team's only in a 3–1 loss at Chapecoense.

On 13 February 2014, Luciano signed a three-year contract with Corinthians in the top level. He made his debut for the club nine days later, replacing Romarinho in a 3–2 Campeonato Paulista home win against Rio Claro.

Luciano subsequently scored two braces for Timão, in a 3–0 home win against Comercial and in a 4–0 away routing of Linense. On 22 August 2014 he scored a hat-trick in a 5–2 home success over Goiás.

On 19 August 2015, in a match against Santos for the national cup, Luciano suffered a serious knee injury. He was sidelined for seven months, returning to action in February of the following year.

On 24 August 2016, Luciano was loaned to La Liga side CD Leganés for one year, with a buyout clause.

=== Panathinaikos, Fluminense and Grêmio ===
On 17 July 2017, Luciano joined Super League Greece club Panathinaikos on loan until the end of the year. On 20 September 2017, Luciano suffered a serious cruciate rupture injury during Greek Cup's clash against AEL at Leoforos Alexandras Stadium. He was expected to return to action in March 2018.

In the end of 2018 he went to Fluminense.

In 2019, he moved to Grêmio.

=== São Paulo ===
On 18 August 2020, Luciano signed until December 2022 with São Paulo FC. He came to Tricolor after Éverton signed with Grêmio, and going to Luciano's opposite side.

== International career ==
Luciano was called for the Brazil U23 team representing the country at the 2015 Pan American Games in Toronto, Ontario, Canada. He was the tournament's top goalscorer with five goals in only four matches, and won a Bronze medal.

== Career statistics ==
As of match played 6 November 2025

Appearances and goals by club, season and competition
| Club | Season | League | | | State league (Note: Includes Campeonato Goiano, Campeonato Catarinense, Campeonato Paulista, Campeonato Gaúcho) | | National cup (Note: Includes Copa do Brasil, Copa del Rey, Greek Football Cup) | | Continental | | Other | | Total | |
| Club | Season | Division | Apps | Goals | Apps | Goals | Apps | Goals | Apps | Goals | Apps | Goals | Apps | Goals |
|---|---|---|---|---|---|---|---|---|---|---|---|---|---|---|
| Atlético Goianiense | 2012 | Série A | 5 | 1 | — | | 1 | 0 | — | | — | | 6 | 1 |
| Atlético Goianiense | 2013 | Série B | 0 | 0 | 1 | 0 | 0 | 0 | — | | — | | 1 | 0 |
| Atlético Goianiense | Total | | 5 | 1 | 1 | 0 | 1 | 0 | 0 | 0 | 0 | 0 | 7 | 1 |
| Avaí | 2013 | Série B | 23 | 5 | — | | 0 | 0 | — | | — | | 23 | 5 |
| Avaí | 2014 | Série B | 0 | 0 | 5 | 2 | 0 | 0 | — | | — | | 5 | 2 |
| Avaí | Total | | 23 | 5 | 5 | 2 | 0 | 0 | 0 | 0 | 0 | 0 | 28 | 7 |
| Corinthians | 2014 | Série A | 33 | 6 | 6 | 4 | 8 | 3 | — | | — | | 47 | 13 |
| Corinthians | 2015 | Série A | 6 | 5 | 9 | 1 | 1 | 0 | 2 (Note: Appearance(s) in Copa Libertadores) | 0 | — | | 18 | 6 |
| Corinthians | 2016 | Série A | 15 | 1 | 7 | 0 | — | | 2 | 0 | — | | 24 | 1 |
| Corinthians | Total | | 54 | 12 | 22 | 5 | 9 | 3 | 4 | 0 | 0 | 0 | 89 | 20 |
| Leganés | 2016–17 | La Liga | 25 | 4 | — | | 2 | 0 | — | | — | | 27 | 4 |
| Panathinaikos | 2017–18 | Super League Greece | 9 | 2 | — | | 1 | 0 | 4 (Note: Appearances in UEFA Europa League) | 0 | — | | 14 | 2 |
| Fluminense | 2018 | Série A | 18 | 3 | 0 | 0 | 0 | 0 | 6 (Note: Appearances in Copa Sudamericana) | 2 | — | | 24 | 5 |
| Fluminense | 2019 | Série A | 6 | 2 | 13 | 6 | 8 | 5 | 4 | 2 | — | | 31 | 15 |
| Fluminense | Total | | 24 | 5 | 13 | 6 | 8 | 5 | 10 | 4 | 0 | 0 | 55 | 20 |
| Grêmio | 2019 | Série A | 19 | 5 | 0 | 0 | 0 | 0 | 1 | 0 | — | | 20 | 5 |
| Grêmio | 2020 | Série A | 1 | 0 | 14 | 3 | 0 | 0 | 1 | 0 | — | | 16 | 3 |
| Grêmio | Total | | 20 | 5 | 14 | 3 | 0 | 0 | 2 | 0 | 0 | 0 | 36 | 8 |
| São Paulo | 2020 | Série A | 31 | 18 | 0 | 0 | 5 | 3 | 2 | 0 | — | | 38 | 21 |
| São Paulo | 2021 | Série A | 22 | 4 | 10 | 4 | 3 | 2 | 4 | 0 | — | | 39 | 10 |
| São Paulo | 2022 | Série A | 31 | 11 | 7 | 1 | 9 | 4 | 12 | 5 | — | | 59 | 21 |
| São Paulo | 2023 | Série A | 34 | 9 | 12 | 2 | 9 | 2 | 10 | 2 | — | | 65 | 15 |
| São Paulo | 2024 | Série A | 31 | 11 | 13 | 3 | 5 | 1 | 10 | 3 | 1 (Note: Appearance in Supercopa do Brasil) | 0 | 60 | 18 |
| São Paulo | 2025 | Série A | 27 | 8 | 10 | 3 | 4 | 3 | 10 | 1 | | | 51 | 15 |
| São Paulo | Total | | 176 | 61 | 52 | 12 | 35 | 15 | 48 | 11 | 1 | 0 | 312 | 100 |
| Career total | | | 336 | 95 | 107 | 29 | 56 | 23 | 68 | 15 | 1 | 0 | 568 | 162 |

== Honours ==
Corinthians

- Campeonato Brasileiro Série A: 2015

Grêmio

- Taça Francisco Novelletto: 2020
- Campeonato Gaúcho: 2020

São Paulo

- Copa do Brasil: 2023
- Supercopa do Brasil: 2024
- Campeonato Paulista: 2021

Individual

- 2015 Pan American Games top scorer: 5 goals
- 2019 Copa do Brasil top scorer: 5 goals
- 2020 Campeonato Brasileiro Série A top scorer: 18 goals
