= Francisco Morato =

- Municipality
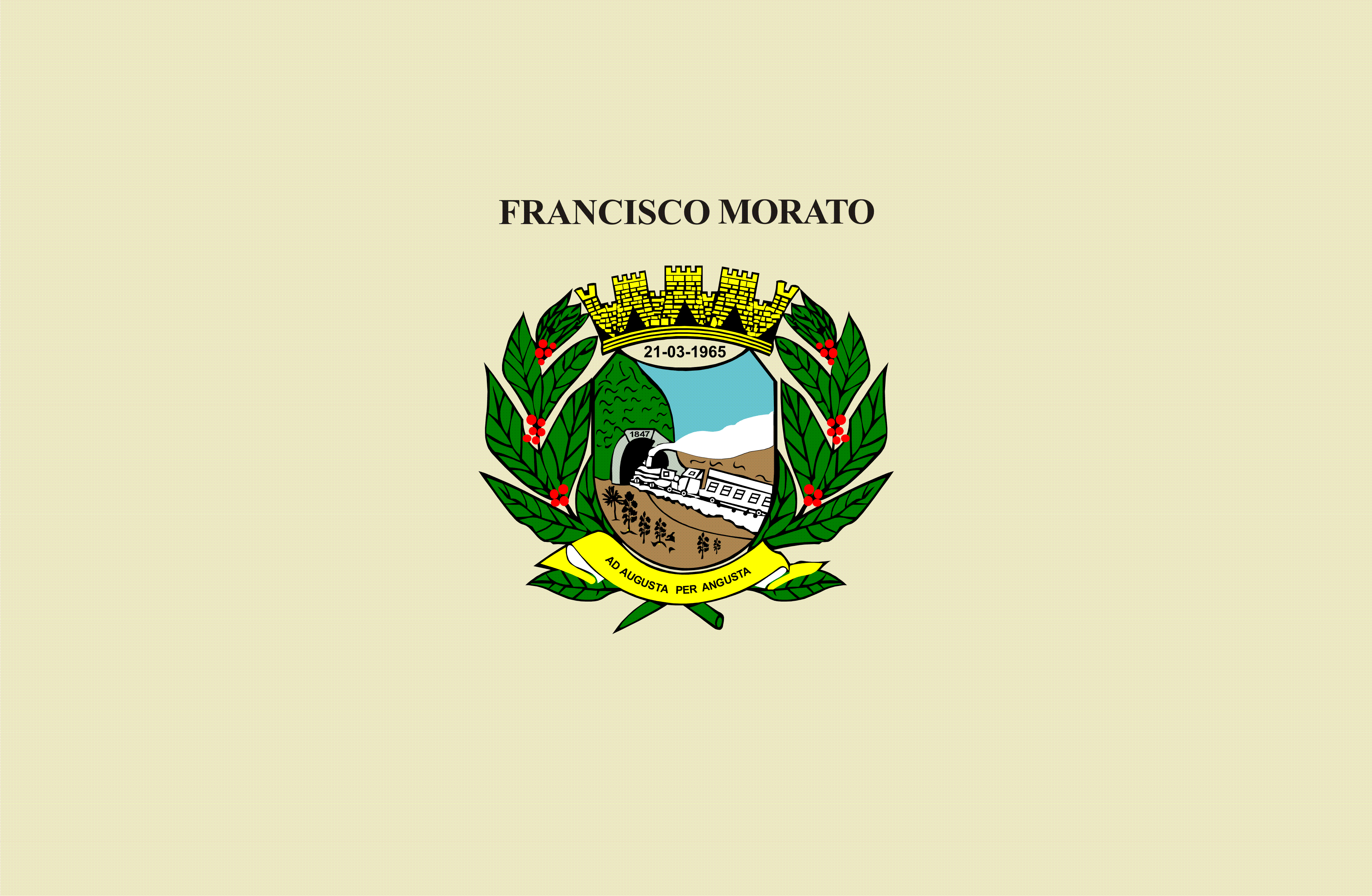
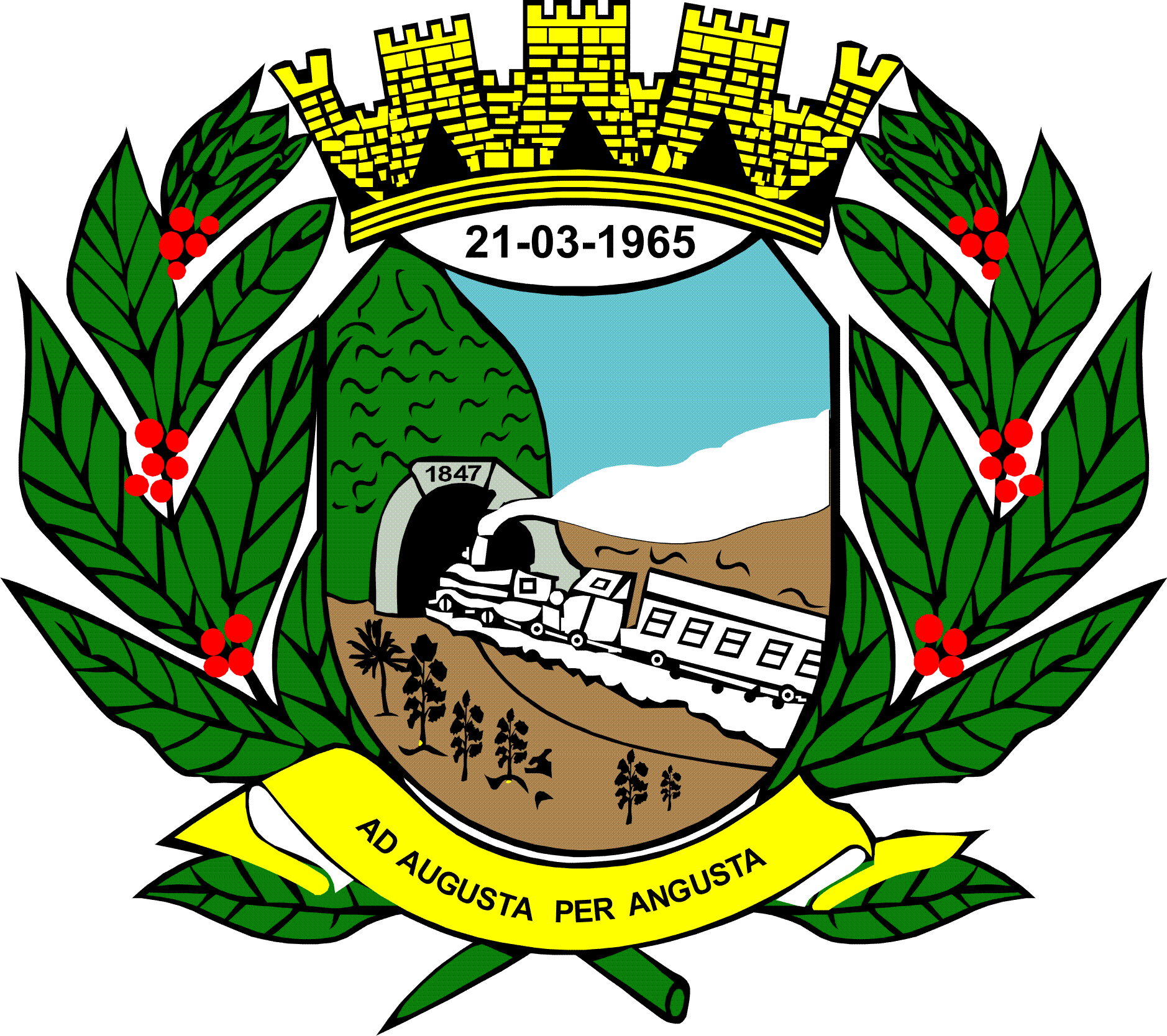
- Flag Coat of arms

- Location in São Paulo state

- Location in Brazil
- Coordinates: 23°16′54″S 46°44′33″W
- Country: Brazil
- Region: Southeast Brazil
- State: São Paulo
- Metropolitan Region: São Paulo

Government
  - Prefect: Ildo Gusmão

Area
  - Total: 4,900 km^{2} (1,900 sq mi)

Population (2022 Census)
  - Total: 165,139
  - Estimate (2025): 171,476
  - Density: 34/km^{2} (87/sq mi)
- Time zone: UTC−3 (BRT)

Francisco Morato is a suburban city in the state of São Paulo in Brazil. It is part of the Metropolitan Region of São Paulo. The suburban city is served by the CPTM Line 7.

The population according to the census carried out by IBGE in 2022 was 165,139 inhabitants and has an area of 49,001 km², which results in a population density of 3,370 inhabitants/km². It became a municipality in 1965, when it became independent from Franco da Rocha.

== Media ==
In telecommunications, the city was served by Companhia Telefônica Brasileira until 1973, when it began to be served by Telecomunicações de São Paulo. In July 1998, this company was acquired by Telefónica, which adopted the Vivo brand in 2012.

The company is currently an operator of cell phones, fixed lines, internet (fiber optics/4G) and television (satellite and cable).

== Notable people ==
- Gabriel Dias de Oliveira Football player

== See also ==
- List of municipalities in São Paulo
