= Brayan Lucumí =

Colombian footballer (born 1994)

Personal information
- Full name: Brayan Damián Lucumí Lucumí
- Date of birth: 12 February 1994 (age 32)
- Place of birth: Villa Rica, Colombia
- Height: 1.70 m (5 ft 7 in)
- Position: Winger

Team information
- Current team: Portuguesa FC
- Number: 10

Youth career
- Deportivo Cali

Senior career*
Years	Team	Apps	(Gls)
2013–2016	Deportivo Cali	0	(0)
2014	→ Llaneros (loan)	23	(0)
2015	→ Real Santander (loan)	25	(1)
2016	→ Cúcuta Deportivo (loan)	30	(1)
2017–2019	Tigres UANL	0	(0)
2017–2018	→ Deportivo Pasto (loan)	31	(1)
2019	→ Envigado (loan)	12	(0)
2019–2020	Cortuluá	15	(2)
2020–2021	Coritiba	4	(0)
2021	Portuguesa	2	(0)
2022–	Portuguesa FC	32	(0)
- * Club domestic league appearances and goals as of 23 October 2022

Brayan Damián Lucumí Lucumí (born 12 February 1994) is a Colombian professional footballer who plays as a winger for Venezuelan club Portuguesa.

== Club career ==
Born in Villa Rica, Cauca, Lucumí was a Deportivo Cali youth graduate. He made his first team debut on 14 February 2013, coming on as a second-half substitute for Carlos Rentería in a 4–1 Copa Colombia away win against Dépor.

After failing to make a league appearance for the club, Lucumí was loaned to Llaneros for the 2014 season. Other loan moves to fellow Categoría Primera B sides Real Santander and Cúcuta Deportivo followed, before his permanent move to Mexican side Tigres UANL in 2017.

On 6 July 2017, after not making an appearance for Tigres, Lucumí returned to his home country and joined Deportivo Pasto in the Categoría Primera A. In January 2019, still owned by Tigres, he moved to fellow top-tier side Envigado.

On 8 July 2019, after featuring sparingly, Lucumí moved to Cortuluá in the second tier. On 17 November of the following year, he signed for Brazilian Série A side Coritiba on a short-term deal.
