= 2020 Campeonato Brasileiro Série A =

Football league

Campeonato Brasileiro Série A
- Season: 2020
- Dates: 8 August 2020 – 25 February 2021
- Champions: Flamengo (7th title)
- Relegated: Vasco da Gama; Goiás; Coritiba; Botafogo
- Copa Libertadores: Palmeiras (via Copa Libertadores); Flamengo; Internacional; Atlético Mineiro; São Paulo; Fluminense; Grêmio; Santos
- Copa Sudamericana: Athletico Paranaense; Red Bull Bragantino; Ceará; Corinthians; Atlético Goianiense; Bahia
- Matches: 380
- Goals: 944 (2.48 per match)
- Top goalscorer: Claudinho; Luciano (18 goals each)
- Biggest home win: Corinthians 5–0 Fluminense (13 January 2021)
- Biggest away win: Corinthians 1–5 Flamengo (18 October 2020); São Paulo 1–5 Internacional (20 January 2021); Goiás 0–4 Ceará (21 January 2021); Fortaleza 0–4 Bahia (20 February 2021)
- Highest scoring: Bahia 3–5 Flamengo (2 September 2020); Sport 3–5 Internacional (14 October 2020)
- Longest winning run: 9 games Internacional
- Longest unbeaten run: 17 games São Paulo
- Longest winless run: 11 games Goiás
- Longest losing run: 7 games Bahia; Botafogo

The 2020 Campeonato Brasileiro Série A (officially the Brasileirão Assaí 2020 for sponsorship reasons) was the 64th season of the Campeonato Brasileiro Série A, the top level of professional football in Brazil, and the 18th edition in a double round-robin since its establishment in 2003. The competition was originally scheduled to begin on 3 May and end on 6 December, however due to the COVID-19 pandemic the tournament was rescheduled, starting on 8 August 2020 and ending on 25 February 2021.

The top six teams as well as the 2020 Copa do Brasil champions qualified for the Copa Libertadores. The next six best-placed teams not qualified for Copa Libertadores qualified for the Copa Sudamericana and the last four were relegated to Série B for 2021. The match ball for the 2020 season was the Nike Merlin CBF 2020, which was presented by the Brazilian Football Confederation on 31 January 2020. Flamengo successfully defended the title, winning their seventh championship on the last day of the season despite losing 2–1 to São Paulo, after Internacional drew with Corinthians at home by a 0–0 score.

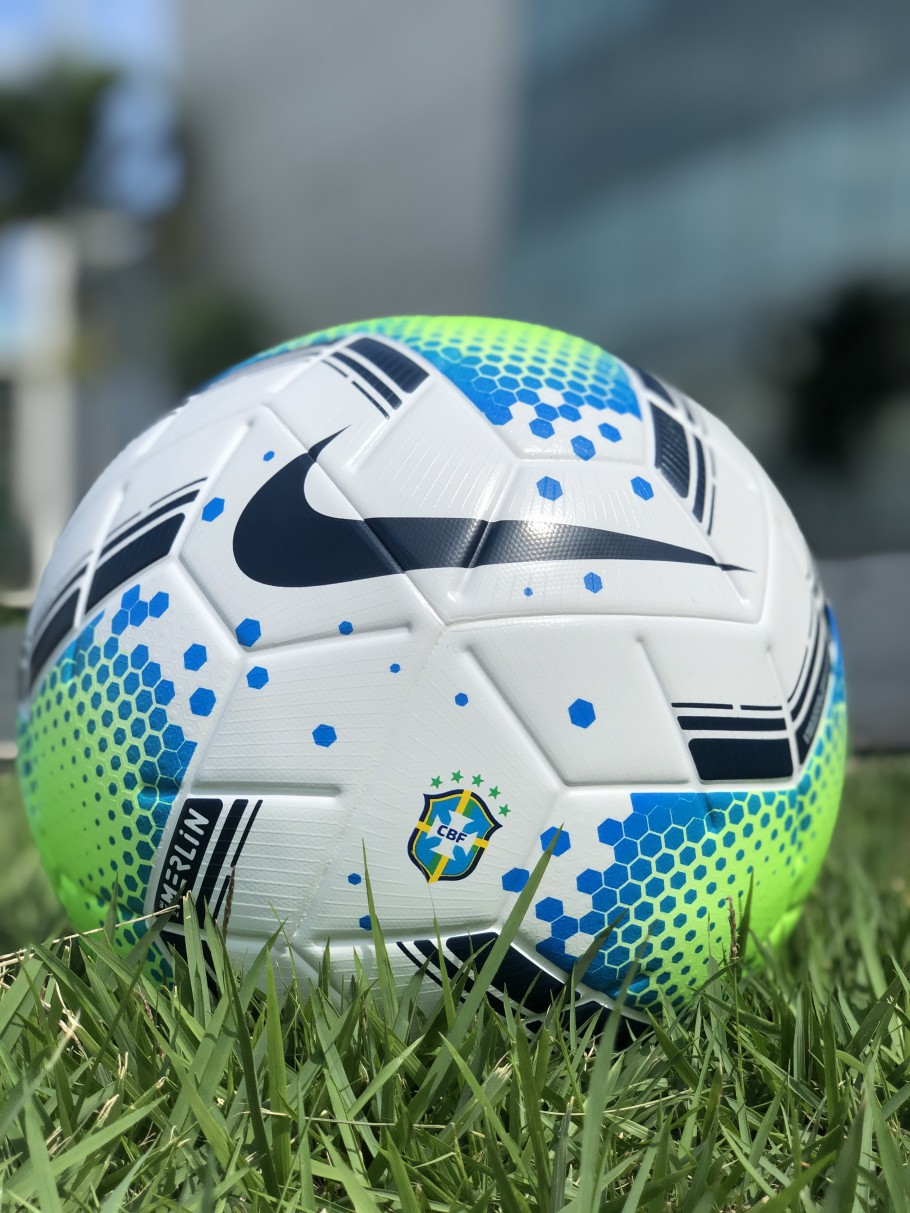
2020 Nike Merlin CBF

== Teams ==
Location of teams in 2020 Série A

Twenty teams competed in the league – the top sixteen teams from the previous season, as well as four teams promoted from the Série B.

Red Bull Bragantino became the first club to be promoted, assured of a return to the top flight after 22 years of absence following a 3–1 win against Guarani on 5 November 2019.

Sport was promoted on 20 November, making an immediate return to the first division after a season away.

The final two teams to be promoted were Coritiba and Atlético Goianiense, on 30 November, both returning after a two-year absence.

Pos.	Relegated from 2019 Série A
17	Cruzeiro
18	CSA
19	Chapecoense
20	Avaí

Pos.	Promoted from 2019 Série B
1	Red Bull Bragantino
2	Sport
3	Coritiba
4	Atlético Goianiense

=== Number of teams by state ===
Number of teams	State	Team(s)
5	São Paulo	Corinthians, Palmeiras, Red Bull Bragantino, Santos and São Paulo
4	Rio de Janeiro	Botafogo, Flamengo, Fluminense and Vasco da Gama
2	Ceará	Ceará and Fortaleza
2	Goiás	Atlético Goianiense and Goiás
2	Paraná	Athletico Paranaense and Coritiba
2	Rio Grande do Sul	Grêmio and Internacional
1	Bahia	Bahia
1	Minas Gerais	Atlético Mineiro
1	Pernambuco	Sport

=== Stadiums and locations ===
Team	Location	State	Stadium	Capacity
Athletico Paranaense	Curitiba	Paraná	Arena da Baixada	42,372
Atlético Goianiense	Goiânia	Goiás	Antônio Accioly	12,500
Atlético Mineiro	Belo Horizonte	Minas Gerais	Mineirão	61,846
Bahia	Salvador	Bahia	Pituaçu	32,157
Botafogo	Rio de Janeiro	Rio de Janeiro	Olímpico Nilton Santos	44,661
Ceará	Fortaleza	Ceará	Castelão	63,903
Corinthians	São Paulo	São Paulo	Neo Química Arena	47,605
Coritiba	Curitiba	Paraná	Couto Pereira	40,502
Flamengo	Rio de Janeiro	Rio de Janeiro	Maracanã	78,838
Fluminense	Rio de Janeiro	Rio de Janeiro	Maracanã	78,838
Fortaleza	Fortaleza	Ceará	Castelão	63,903
Goiás	Goiânia	Goiás	Estádio da Serrinha	12,500
Grêmio	Porto Alegre	Rio Grande do Sul	Arena do Grêmio	55,662
Internacional	Porto Alegre	Rio Grande do Sul	Beira-Rio	50,128
Palmeiras	São Paulo	São Paulo	Allianz Parque	43,713
Red Bull Bragantino	Bragança Paulista	São Paulo	Nabi Abi Chedid	17,128
Santos	Santos	São Paulo	Vila Belmiro	16,068
São Paulo	São Paulo	São Paulo	Morumbi	72,039
Sport	Recife	Pernambuco	Ilha do Retiro	32,983
Vasco da Gama	Rio de Janeiro	Rio de Janeiro	São Januário	24,584

== Personnel and kits ==
Team	Manager	Captain	Kit manufacturer	Shirt main sponsor
Athletico Paranaense	(Brazil) Paulo Autuori	(Brazil) Thiago Heleno	Umbro	VisitaARevolucao.com.br
Atlético Goianiense	(Brazil) Marcelo Cabo	(Brazil) Gilvan	Dragão Premium (club manufactured kit)	None
Atlético Mineiro	(Argentina) Jorge Sampaoli	(Brazil) Réver	Le Coq Sportif	Galo BMG
Bahia	(Brazil) Dado Cavalcanti	(Brazil) Gregore	Esquadrão (club manufactured kit)	Casa de Apostas
Botafogo	(Brazil) Lúcio Flávio (caretaker)	(Paraguay) Gatito Fernández	Kappa	Gold Meat
Ceará	(Brazil) Guto Ferreira	(Brazil) Luiz Otávio	Vozão (club manufactured kit)	estadium.bet
Corinthians	(Brazil) Vágner Mancini	(Brazil) Cássio	Nike	Corinthians BMG
Coritiba	(Paraguay) Gustavo Morínigo	(Brazil) Rafinha	1909 (club manufactured kit)	Paraná Banco
Flamengo	(Brazil) Rogério Ceni	(Brazil) Éverton Ribeiro	Adidas	Banco BRB
Fluminense	(Brazil) Marcão	(Brazil) Fred	Umbro	None
Fortaleza	(Brazil) Enderson Moreira	(Brazil) Paulão	Leão1918 (club manufactured kit)	EsporteNet
Goiás	(Brazil) Augusto César	(Brazil) Rafael Moura	Gr33n (club manufactured kit)	Marjo Sports
Grêmio	(Brazil) Renato Portaluppi	(Brazil) Pedro Geromel	Umbro	Banrisul
Internacional	(Brazil) Abel Braga	(Brazil) Edenílson	Adidas	Banrisul
Palmeiras	(Portugal) Abel Ferreira	(Brazil) Felipe Melo	Puma	Crefisa
Red Bull Bragantino	(Brazil) Maurício Barbieri	(Brazil) Léo Ortiz	Nike	Red Bull
Santos	(Brazil) Marcelo Fernandes (caretaker)	(Uruguay) Carlos Sánchez	Umbro	None
São Paulo	(Brazil) Marcos Vizolli (caretaker)	(Brazil) Dani Alves	Adidas	Banco Inter
Sport	(Brazil) Jair Ventura	(Brazil) Patric	Umbro	Galera.bet
Vasco da Gama	(Brazil) Vanderlei Luxemburgo	(Brazil) Leandro Castán	Kappa	Vasco BMG

=== Foreign players ===
The clubs can have a maximum of five foreign players in their Campeonato Brasileiro squads per match, but there is no limit of foreigners in the clubs' squads.

Club	Player 1	Player 2	Player 3	Player 4	Player 5	Player 6
Athletico Paranaense	(Argentina) Lucho González	(Colombia) Felipe Aguilar	(Colombia) Jaime Alvarado			
Atlético Goianiense	(South Korea) Chico^{dn}					
Atlético Mineiro	(Colombia) Dylan Borrero	(Venezuela) Jefferson Savarino	(Paraguay) Júnior Alonso	(Ecuador) Alan Franco	(Argentina) Matías Zaracho	(Chile) Eduardo Vargas
Bahia	(Colombia) Juan Ramírez					
Botafogo	(Paraguay) Gatito Fernández	(Uruguay) Federico Barrandeguy	(Peru) Alexander Lecaros	(Japan) Keisuke Honda	(Ivory Coast) Salomon Kalou	(Colombia) Iván Angulo
Ceará						
Corinthians	(Uruguay) Bruno Méndez	(Chile) Ángelo Araos	(Colombia) Víctor Cantillo	(Venezuela) Rómulo Otero	(Ecuador) Juan Cazares	
Coritiba	(Argentina) Martín Sarrafiore	(Argentina) Ezequiel Cerutti	(Colombia) Brayan Lucumí			
Flamengo	(Uruguay) Giorgian De Arrascaeta	(Chile) Mauricio Isla	(Colombia) Richard Ríos			
Fluminense	(Portugal) Marcos Paulo^{dn}	(Uruguay) Michel Araújo	(Peru) Fernando Pacheco			
Fortaleza	(Colombia) Juan Quintero	(Argentina) Mariano Vázquez				
Goiás	(Argentina) Ariel Cabral					
Grêmio	(Argentina) Walter Kannemann	(Argentina) Diego Churín	(Chile) César Pinares			
Internacional	(Argentina) Víctor Cuesta	(Peru) Paolo Guerrero	(United States) Johnny Cardoso^{dn}	(Argentina) Renzo Saravia	(Uruguay) Abel Hernández	(Argentina) Leandro Fernández
Palmeiras	(Paraguay) Gustavo Gómez	(Uruguay) Matías Viña	(Chile) Benjamín Kuscevic			
Red Bull Bragantino	(Ecuador) Leonardo Realpe	(Venezuela) Jan Hurtado	(Colombia) César Haydar	(Argentina) Tomás Cuello		
Santos	(Uruguay) Carlos Sánchez	(Venezuela) Yeferson Soteldo				
São Paulo	(Ecuador) Robert Arboleda	(Ecuador) Joao Rojas	(Uruguay) Gonzalo Carneiro	(Colombia) Santiago Tréllez	(Spain) Juanfran	(Paraguay) Antonio Galeano
Sport	(Uruguay) Leandro Barcia					
Vasco da Gama	(Argentina) Germán Cano	(Argentina) Martín Benítez	(Argentina) Leonardo Gil	(Colombia) Gustavo Torres		

(dn) = Player holding Brazilian dual nationality.

=== Managerial changes ===
Team	Outgoing manager	Manner of departure	Date of vacancy	Position in table	Incoming manager	Date of appointment	Ref
Atlético Goianiense	(Brazil) Eduardo Barroca	Resigned	30 November 2019	Pre-season	(Brazil) Cristóvão Borges	19 January 2020	
Internacional	(Brazil) Zé Ricardo	End of contract	8 December 2019	Pre-season	(Argentina) Eduardo Coudet	16 December 2019	
Atlético Mineiro	(Brazil) Vágner Mancini	End of contract	8 December 2019	Pre-season	(Venezuela) Rafael Dudamel	2 January 2020	
Corinthians	(Brazil) Dyego Coelho	End of caretaker tenure	8 December 2019	Pre-season	(Brazil) Tiago Nunes	5 November 2019	
Athletico Paranaense	(Brazil) Eduardo Barros	End of caretaker tenure	8 December 2019	Pre-season	(Brazil) Dorival Júnior	27 December 2019	
Palmeiras	(Brazil) Andrey Lopes	End of caretaker tenure	9 December 2019	Pre-season	(Brazil) Vanderlei Luxemburgo	15 December 2019	
Santos	(Argentina) Jorge Sampaoli	Resigned	10 December 2019	Pre-season	(Portugal) Jesualdo Ferreira	23 December 2019	
Fluminense	(Brazil) Marcão	Demoted to assistant coach	11 December 2019	Pre-season	(Brazil) Odair Hellmann	11 December 2019	
Coritiba	(Brazil) Jorginho	End of contract	12 December 2019	Pre-season	(Brazil) Eduardo Barroca	20 December 2019	
Vasco da Gama	(Brazil) Vanderlei Luxemburgo	End of contract	12 December 2019	Pre-season	(Brazil) Abel Braga	16 December 2019	
Red Bull Bragantino	(Brazil) Antônio Carlos Zago	Signed by Kashima Antlers	24 December 2019	Pre-season	(Brazil) Felipe Conceição	26 January 2020	
Botafogo	(Brazil) Alberto Valentim	Sacked	9 February 2020	Pre-season	(Brazil) Paulo Autuori	13 February 2020	
Ceará	(Brazil) Argel Fucks	Sacked	9 February 2020	Pre-season	(Brazil) Enderson Moreira	9 February 2020	
Sport	(Brazil) Guto Ferreira	Sacked	13 February 2020	Pre-season	(Brazil) Daniel Paulista	15 February 2020	
Atlético Goianiense	(Brazil) Cristóvão Borges	Sacked	25 February 2020	Pre-season	(Brazil) Vágner Mancini	25 June 2020	
Atlético Mineiro	(Venezuela) Rafael Dudamel	Sacked	27 February 2020	Pre-season	(Argentina) Jorge Sampaoli	1 March 2020	
Vasco da Gama	(Brazil) Abel Braga	Sacked	16 March 2020	Pre-season	(Brazil) Ramon Menezes	30 March 2020	
Ceará	(Brazil) Enderson Moreira	Sacked	17 March 2020	Pre-season	(Brazil) Guto Ferreira	17 March 2020	
Flamengo	(Portugal) Jorge Jesus	Signed by Benfica	17 July 2020	Pre-season	(Spain) Domènec Torrent	31 July 2020	
Santos	(Portugal) Jesualdo Ferreira	Sacked	5 August 2020	Pre-season	(Brazil) Cuca	7 August 2020	
Coritiba	(Brazil) Eduardo Barroca	Sacked	20 August 2020	20th	(Brazil) Mozart (caretaker)	20 August 2020	
Goiás	(Brazil) Ney Franco	Sacked	20 August 2020	18th	(Brazil) Thiago Larghi	21 August 2020	
Sport	(Brazil) Daniel Paulista	Sacked	24 August 2020	18th	(Brazil) Jair Ventura	24 August 2020	
Coritiba	(Brazil) Mozart	End of caretaker tenure	24 August 2020	20th	(Brazil) Jorginho	24 August 2020	
Athletico Paranaense	(Brazil) Dorival Júnior	Sacked	28 August 2020	10th	(Brazil) Eduardo Barros (caretaker)	28 August 2020	
Red Bull Bragantino	(Brazil) Felipe Conceição	Sacked	31 August 2020	17th	(Brazil) Marcinho (caretaker)	31 August 2020	
Red Bull Bragantino	(Brazil) Marcinho	End of caretaker tenure	2 September 2020	17th	(Brazil) Maurício Barbieri	2 September 2020	
Bahia	(Brazil) Roger Machado	Sacked	2 September 2020	12th	(Brazil) Cláudio Prates (caretaker)	2 September 2020	
Bahia	(Brazil) Cláudio Prates	End of caretaker tenure	9 September 2020	12th	(Brazil) Mano Menezes	9 September 2020	
Corinthians	(Brazil) Tiago Nunes	Sacked	11 September 2020	13th	(Brazil) Dyego Coelho (caretaker)	11 September 2020	
Goiás	(Brazil) Thiago Larghi	Sacked	28 September 2020	20th	(Brazil) Enderson Moreira	28 September 2020	
Botafogo	(Brazil) Paulo Autuori	Sacked	1 October 2020	19th	(Brazil) Bruno Lazaroni	1 October 2020	
Vasco da Gama	(Brazil) Ramon Menezes	Sacked	8 October 2020	10th	(Portugal) Ricardo Sá Pinto	14 October 2020	
Atlético Goianiense	(Brazil) Vágner Mancini	Signed by Corinthians	12 October 2020	12th	(Brazil) Eduardo Souza (caretaker)	12 October 2020	
Corinthians	(Brazil) Dyego Coelho	End of caretaker tenure	12 October 2020	17th	(Brazil) Vagner Mancini	12 October 2020	
Palmeiras	(Brazil) Vanderlei Luxemburgo	Sacked	14 October 2020	7th	(Brazil) Andrey Lopes (caretaker)	14 October 2020	
Athletico Paranaense	(Brazil) Eduardo Barros	Sacked	22 October 2020	17th	(Brazil) Paulo Autuori	22 October 2020	
Coritiba	(Brazil) Jorginho	Sacked	25 October 2020	19th	(Brazil) Rodrigo Santana	29 October 2020	
Botafogo	(Brazil) Bruno Lazaroni	Sacked	28 October 2020	16th	(Argentina) Ramón Díaz	5 November 2020	
Palmeiras	(Brazil) Andrey Lopes	End of caretaker tenure	30 October 2020	7th	(Portugal) Abel Ferreira	30 October 2020	
Atlético Goianiense	(Brazil) Eduardo Souza	End of caretaker tenure	7 November 2020	13th	(Brazil) Marcelo Cabo	7 November 2020	
Internacional	(Argentina) Eduardo Coudet	Signed by Celta de Vigo	9 November 2020	1st	(Brazil) Abel Braga	10 November 2020	
Flamengo	(Spain) Domènec Torrent	Sacked	9 November 2020	3rd	(Brazil) Rogério Ceni	10 November 2020	
Fortaleza	(Brazil) Rogério Ceni	Signed by Flamengo	9 November 2020	11th	(Brazil) Marcelo Chamusca	11 November 2020	
Goiás	(Brazil) Enderson Moreira	Sacked	17 November 2020	20th	(Brazil) Augusto César	17 November 2020	
Botafogo	(Argentina) Ramón Díaz	Resigned	27 November 2020	16th	(Brazil) Eduardo Barroca	27 November 2020	
Fluminense	(Brazil) Odair Hellmann	Signed by Al-Wasl	7 December 2020	5th	(Brazil) Marcão	7 December 2020	
Coritiba	(Brazil) Rodrigo Santana	Sacked	13 December 2020	19th	(Brazil) Pachequinho (caretaker)	13 December 2020	
Bahia	(Brazil) Mano Menezes	Sacked	20 December 2020	16th	(Brazil) Dado Cavalcanti	21 December 2020	
Vasco da Gama	(Portugal) Ricardo Sá Pinto	Sacked	29 December 2020	17th	(Brazil) Vanderlei Luxemburgo	31 December 2020	
Coritiba	(Brazil) Pachequinho	End of caretaker tenure	31 December 2020	20th	(Paraguay) Gustavo Morínigo	6 January 2021	
Fortaleza	(Brazil) Marcelo Chamusca	Sacked	7 January 2021	15th	(Brazil) Enderson Moreira	7 January 2021	
São Paulo	(Brazil) Fernando Diniz	Sacked	1 February 2021	4th	(Brazil) Marcos Vizolli (caretaker)	1 February 2021	
Botafogo	(Brazil) Eduardo Barroca	Sacked	6 February 2021	20th	(Brazil) Lúcio Flávio (caretaker)	6 February 2021	
Santos	(Brazil) Cuca	Mutual agreement	21 February 2021	8th	(Brazil) Marcelo Fernandes (caretaker)	22 February 2021	

== Standings ==
=== League table ===
Pos	Team	Pld	W	D	L	GF	GA	GD	Pts	Qualification or relegation
1	Flamengo (C)	38	21	8	9	68	48	+20	71	Qualification for Copa Libertadores group stage
2	Internacional	38	20	10	8	61	35	+26	70	Qualification for Copa Libertadores group stage
3	Atlético Mineiro	38	20	8	10	64	45	+19	68	Qualification for Copa Libertadores group stage
4	São Paulo	38	18	12	8	59	41	+18	66	Qualification for Copa Libertadores group stage
5	Fluminense	38	18	10	10	55	42	+13	64	Qualification for Copa Libertadores group stage
6	Grêmio	38	14	17	7	53	40	+13	59	Qualification for Copa Libertadores second stage
7	Palmeiras	38	15	13	10	51	37	+14	58	Qualification for Copa Libertadores group stage (Note: Palmeiras qualified for the Copa Libertadores group stage by winning the 2020 Copa Libertadores and the 2020 Copa do Brasil.)
8	Santos	38	14	12	12	52	51	+1	54	Qualification for Copa Libertadores second stage
9	Athletico Paranaense	38	15	8	15	38	36	+2	53	Qualification for Copa Sudamericana group stage
10	Red Bull Bragantino	38	13	14	11	50	40	+10	53	Qualification for Copa Sudamericana group stage
11	Ceará	38	14	10	14	54	51	+3	52	Qualification for Copa Sudamericana group stage
12	Corinthians	38	13	12	13	45	45	0	51	Qualification for Copa Sudamericana group stage
13	Atlético Goianiense	38	12	14	12	40	45	−5	50	Qualification for Copa Sudamericana group stage
14	Bahia	38	12	8	18	48	59	−11	44	Qualification for Copa Sudamericana group stage
15	Sport	38	12	6	20	31	50	−19	42	
16	Fortaleza	38	10	11	17	34	44	−10	41	
17	Vasco da Gama (R)	38	10	11	17	37	56	−19	41	Relegation to Campeonato Brasileiro Série B
18	Goiás (R)	38	9	10	19	41	63	−22	37	Relegation to Campeonato Brasileiro Série B
19	Coritiba (R)	38	7	10	21	31	54	−23	31	Relegation to Campeonato Brasileiro Série B
20	Botafogo (R)	38	5	12	21	32	62	−30	27	Relegation to Campeonato Brasileiro Série B

Source: CBF
Rules for classification: 1) points; 2) wins; 3) goal difference; 4) goals scored; 5) head-to-head results (only between 2 teams); 6) fewest red cards; 7) fewest yellow cards; 8) draw.
(C) Champions; (R) Relegated

=== Positions by round ===
The table lists the positions of teams after each week of matches.
In order to preserve chronological evolvements, any postponed matches are not included to the round at which they were originally scheduled, but added to the full round they were played immediately afterwards.

Team ╲ Round	1	2	3	4	5	6	7	8	9	10	11	12	13	14	15	16	17	18	19	20	21	22	23	24	25	26	27	28	29	30	31	32	33	34	35	36	37	38
Athletico-PR	1	1	5	6	10	13	13	16	17	13	15	11	12	12	15	18	17	18	19	19	17	9	12	12	14	12	11	10	11	10	12	12	8	10	10	8	9	9
Atlético-GO	8	5	7	12	17	20	19	18	14	11	14	13	11	16	12	9	9	11	13	13	14	12	14	15	12	11	12	12	12	13	13	13	12	13	13	13	13	13
Atlético-MG	4	3	1	3	4	5	3	3	5	2	1	1	1	1	1	1	3	3	3	2	1	1	1	2	2	3	2	3	3	3	4	4	3	3	3	3	3	3
Bahia	9	7	4	4	8	8	12	12	15	16	19	20	16	13	16	16	12	14	15	14	9	10	13	13	16	16	16	17	17	17	15	17	15	17	16	16	15	14
Botafogo	10	11	14	8	11	15	17	15	16	17	18	18	19	17	13	15	14	16	14	17	19	19	19	19	20	18	19	19	19	20	20	20	20	20	20	20	20	20
Ceará	16	13	18	19	19	11	7	10	12	9	11	12	13	14	11	13	13	10	12	12	13	16	10	9	10	10	10	11	10	11	10	8	9	12	12	12	12	11
Corinthians	11	16	16	11	12	16	9	11	13	15	13	15	14	15	17	14	16	13	11	10	11	14	11	11	9	9	9	9	8	9	8	10	10	8	8	10	10	12
Coritiba	17	18	20	20	20	14	15	17	18	19	16	16	17	18	18	17	18	19	17	15	18	18	18	18	18	19	20	20	20	19	18	19	19	19	19	19	19	19
Flamengo	18	20	12	17	15	9	6	5	2	5	6	6	4	3	3	3	2	2	2	3	4	2	3	3	3	2	3	4	4	4	3	3	2	2	2	2	1	1
Fluminense	19	14	9	14	7	4	5	8	9	8	9	7	8	6	5	5	6	4	4	5	8	5	8	5	7	7	7	7	7	7	7	7	5	5	5	5	5	5
Fortaleza	20	19	19	15	14	7	10	13	8	10	8	10	10	9	8	8	7	8	10	11	12	11	9	10	13	14	14	15	16	16	14	16	17	15	15	15	16	16
Goiás	12	17	17	18	16	18	20	20	20	18	20	19	20	20	20	20	20	20	20	20	20	20	20	20	19	20	18	18	18	18	19	18	18	18	18	18	18	18
Grêmio	3	4	6	7	9	12	16	14	10	12	12	14	15	11	14	11	10	9	8	8	7	8	7	4	6	5	5	5	5	6	6	6	7	7	6	7	6	6
Internacional	5	2	3	2	1	1	1	1	1	1	2	2	2	2	2	2	1	1	1	1	2	4	4	6	5	4	4	2	2	2	1	1	1	1	1	1	2	2
Palmeiras	13	12	13	9	5	6	8	6	4	6	4	4	3	5	7	7	8	7	7	6	5	6	5	7	4	6	6	6	6	5	5	5	6	6	7	6	7	7
Red Bull Bragantino	7	10	15	10	13	17	18	19	19	20	17	17	18	19	19	19	19	15	18	16	15	13	15	14	11	13	13	13	13	12	11	11	13	9	9	11	11	10
Santos	6	15	8	5	6	10	11	7	7	7	7	9	6	7	6	6	5	6	6	7	6	7	6	8	8	8	8	8	9	8	9	9	11	11	11	9	8	8
São Paulo	14	8	11	13	3	2	2	2	3	3	3	3	7	4	4	4	4	5	5	4	3	3	2	1	1	1	1	1	1	1	2	2	4	4	4	4	4	4
Sport	2	9	10	16	18	19	14	9	11	14	10	8	5	8	9	10	11	12	9	9	10	15	16	16	15	15	15	14	14	14	16	14	16	14	14	14	14	15
Vasco da Gama	15	6	2	1	2	3	4	4	6	4	5	5	9	10	10	12	15	17	16	18	16	17	17	17	17	17	17	16	15	15	17	15	14	16	17	17	17	17

Leader and Copa Libertadores group stage
Copa Libertadores group stage
Copa Libertadores second stage
Copa Sudamericana group stage
Relegation to Campeonato Brasileiro Série B

Source: CBF.com

== Results ==
Home \ Away	CAP	ACG	CAM	BAH	BOT	CEA	COR	CFC	FLA	FLU	FOR	GOI	GRE	INT	PAL	RBB	SAN	SPA	SPO	VAS
Athletico Paranaense	—	2–1	0–1	1–0	1–1	0–0	0–1	1–0	2–1	0–1	2–1	2–1	1–2	0–0	0–1	1–1	1–0	1–1	2–0	3–0
Atlético Goianiense	1–1	—	3–4	1–1	1–1	0–2	1–1	3–1	3–0	2–1	2–0	0–1	1–1	0–0	0–3	2–1	1–1	2–1	1–1	0–0
Atlético Mineiro	0–2	3–1	—	1–1	2–1	2–0	3–2	2–0	4–0	1–1	2–0	3–0	3–1	2–2	2–0	2–1	2–0	3–0	0–0	4–1
Bahia	1–0	0–1	3–1	—	1–0	0–2	2–1	1–0	3–5	0–1	2–1	3–3	0–2	1–2	1–1	2–1	2–0	1–3	1–2	3–0
Botafogo	0–2	1–3	2–1	1–2	—	2–2	0–2	0–0	0–1	1–1	1–2	0–0	2–5	0–2	2–1	1–2	0–0	1–0	0–1	2–3
Ceará	0–2	1–2	2–2	2–0	2–1	—	2–1	2–1	2–0	1–3	1–0	2–2	1–1	0–2	2–1	1–2	0–1	1–1	0–0	0–3
Corinthians	3–3	0–0	1–2	3–2	2–2	2–1	—	3–1	1–5	5–0	1–1	2–1	0–0	1–0	0–2	0–2	1–1	1–0	3–0	0–0
Coritiba	0–0	1–0	0–1	1–2	1–2	0–2	0–1	—	0–1	3–3	0–0	1–2	1–1	0–1	1–0	0–0	1–2	1–1	1–0	1–0
Flamengo	3–1	1–1	0–1	4–3	1–1	0–2	2–1	3–1	—	1–2	2–1	2–1	1–1	2–1	2–0	1–1	4–1	1–4	3–0	2–0
Fluminense	3–1	1–1	0–0	1–0	2–0	2–2	2–1	4–0	1–2	—	2–0	3–0	0–1	2–1	1–1	0–0	3–1	1–2	1–0	2–1
Fortaleza	0–2	0–0	2–1	0–4	0–0	0–2	0–0	3–1	0–0	0–1	—	1–1	0–0	1–0	2–0	3–0	2–0	2–3	1–0	3–0
Goiás	0–1	2–0	1–0	1–1	2–0	0–4	1–2	3–3	0–3	2–4	1–3	—	0–0	1–0	1–0	0–0	2–3	0–3	1–0	1–1
Grêmio	1–0	2–1	1–1	2–1	3–1	4–2	0–0	2–1	2–4	1–0	1–1	2–1	—	1–1	1–1	2–1	3–3	1–2	1–2	4–0
Internacional	2–1	3–0	1–0	2–2	2–1	2–0	0–0	2–2	2–2	1–2	4–2	1–0	2–1	—	2–0	2–1	2–0	1–1	1–2	2–0
Palmeiras	3–0	1–1	3–0	3–0	1–1	2–1	4–0	1–3	1–1	2–0	3–0	1–1	1–1	1–1	—	1–0	2–1	0–2	2–2	1–1
Red Bull Bragantino	0–1	2–0	2–2	4–0	1–1	4–2	0–0	1–2	1–1	2–1	2–1	2–0	1–0	0–2	1–2	—	1–1	4–2	2–0	4–1
Santos	3–1	0–1	3–1	3–1	2–1	1–1	1–0	2–0	0–1	1–1	1–1	3–4	2–1	2–0	2–2	1–1	—	2–2	4–2	2–2
São Paulo	1–0	3–0	3–0	1–1	4–0	1–1	2–1	1–1	2–1	3–1	1–0	2–1	0–0	1–5	1–1	1–1	0–1	—	1–0	1–1
Sport	1–0	0–1	2–3	2–0	1–2	3–2	1–0	1–0	0–3	1–0	1–0	2–1	1–1	3–5	0–1	0–0	0–1	0–1	—	0–2
Vasco da Gama	1–0	1–2	3–2	0–0	3–0	1–4	1–2	0–1	1–2	1–1	0–0	3–2	0–0	0–2	0–1	1–1	1–0	2–1	2–0	—

Source: CBF
Legend: Blue = home team win; Yellow = draw; Red = away team win.

== Season statistics ==
=== Top scorers ===
Rank	Player	Club	Goals
1	(Brazil) Claudinho	Red Bull Bragantino	18
1	(Brazil) Luciano	São Paulo	18
3	(Brazil) Thiago Galhardo	Internacional	17
3	(Brazil) Marinho	Santos	17
5	(Brazil) Gabriel Barbosa	Flamengo	14
5	(Argentina) Germán Cano	Vasco da Gama	14
7	(Brazil) Diego Souza	Grêmio	13
7	(Brazil) Pedro	Flamengo	13
7	(Brazil) Vina	Ceará	13
10	(Brazil) Brenner	São Paulo	11
10	(Brazil) Renato Kayzer	Atlético Goianiense / Athletico Paranaense	11
10	(Brazil) Raphael Veiga	Palmeiras	11

Source: Soccerway

=== Assists ===
Rank	Player	Club	Assists
1	(Uruguay) Giorgian De Arrascaeta	Flamengo	9
1	(Brazil) Keno	Atlético Mineiro	9
1	(Brazil) Vina	Ceará	9
4	(Brazil) Ytalo	Red Bull Bragantino	8
5	(Brazil) Bruno Henrique	Flamengo	7
5	(Brazil) Egídio	Fluminense	7
5	(Brazil) Marinho	Santos	7
8	(Brazil) Guilherme Arana	Atlético Mineiro	6
8	(Brazil) Claudinho	Red Bull Bragantino	6
8	(Brazil) Éverton Ribeiro	Flamengo	6
8	(Brazil) Gabriel Menino	Palmeiras	6
8	(Brazil) Léo Chú	Ceará	6
8	(Brazil) Reinaldo	São Paulo	6
8	(Venezuela) Jefferson Savarino	Atlético Mineiro	6

Source: Soccerway

=== Clean sheets ===
Rank	Player	Club	Clean sheets
1	(Brazil) Marcelo Lomba	Internacional	15
2	(Brazil) Felipe Alves	Fortaleza	12
2	(Brazil) Santos	Athletico Paranaense	12
4	(Brazil) Cássio	Corinthians	11
4	(Brazil) Fernando Miguel	Vasco da Gama	11
4	(Brazil) Weverton	Palmeiras	11
7	(Brazil) Cleiton	Red Bull Bragantino	10
7	(Brazil) Luan Polli	Sport	10
7	(Brazil) Tiago Volpi	São Paulo	10
10	(Brazil) Everson	Santos / Atlético Mineiro	9
10	(Brazil) Jean	Atlético Goianiense	9

Source: FBref.com

== Awards ==
=== Monthly awards ===
Month	Player of the month		Ref.
Month	Player	Club	Ref.
August	(Brazil) Thiago Galhardo	Internacional	
September	(Brazil) Marinho	Santos	
October	(Brazil) Pedro	Flamengo	
November	(Brazil) Luciano	São Paulo	
December	(Brazil) Brenner	São Paulo	
January	(Brazil) Claudinho	Red Bull Bragantino	
February	(Brazil) Gabriel Barbosa	Flamengo	

=== Annual awards ===
Award	Winner	Club
Prêmio Craque do Brasileirão Best Coach	(Brazil) Abel Braga	Internacional
Bola de Prata Best Coach	(Brazil) Rogério Ceni	Flamengo
Prêmio Craque do Brasileirão Best Newcomer	(Brazil) Claudinho	Red Bull Bragantino
Bola de Prata Best Newcomer	(Brazil) Claudinho	Red Bull Bragantino
Prêmio Craque do Brasileirão Best Player	(Brazil) Claudinho	Red Bull Bragantino
Bola de Ouro Best Player	(Brazil) Claudinho	Red Bull Bragantino
Prêmio Craque do Brasileirão Goal of the Season	(Brazil) Éverton Ribeiro	Flamengo

Série A Team of the Year
Goalkeeper	(Brazil) Weverton (Palmeiras)			
Defence	(Brazil) Fagner (Corinthians)	(Paraguay) Gustavo Gómez (Palmeiras)	(Argentina) Víctor Cuesta (Internacional)	(Brazil) Guilherme Arana (Atlético Mineiro)
Midfield	(Brazil) Vina (Ceará)	(Brazil) Edenílson (Internacional)	(Brazil) Gerson (Flamengo)	(Brazil) Claudinho (Red Bull Bragantino)
Attack	(Brazil) Gabriel Barbosa (Flamengo)		(Brazil) Marinho (Santos)	
