= Santiago Tréllez =

Colombian footballer (born 1990)

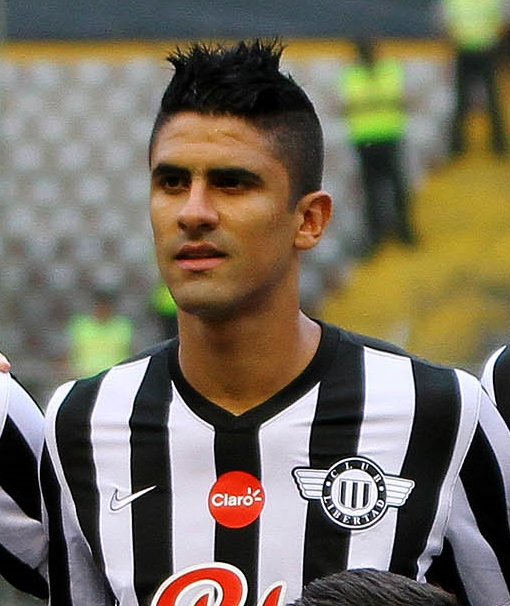
- Tréllez with Libertad in 2015

Personal information
- Full name: Santiago Tréllez Vivero
- Date of birth: January 17, 1990 (age 36)
- Place of birth: Medellín, Colombia
- Height: 1.90 m (6 ft 3 in)
- Position: Striker

Team information
- Current team: Operário-PR

Youth career
- Envigado
- 2006–2007: Independiente Medellín
- 2007–2008: Flamengo
- 2008–2010: Vélez Sarsfield

Senior career*
Years	Team	Apps	(Gls)
2011–2012	Independiente Medellín	49	(11)
2012–2013	San Luis	27	(4)
2013–2015	Chiapas	0	(0)
2013	→ Morelia (loan)	9	(0)
2014	→ Atlético Nacional (loan)	23	(2)
2015	Atlético Nacional	0	(0)
2015	→ Libertad (loan)	17	(3)
2015–2016	Arsenal de Sarandí	7	(2)
2016	→ La Equidad (loan)	28	(3)
2017	Deportivo Pasto	17	(9)
2017	Vitória	23	(10)
2018–2021	São Paulo	31	(4)
2019	→ Internacional (loan)	4	(0)
2021	→ Sport Recife (loan)	30	(1)
2022–2023	Vitória	41	(10)
2023–	Operário-PR	6	(2)

International career
2007	Colombia U17	16	(4)
- * Club domestic league appearances and goals as of 8 October 2023

Santiago Tréllez Vivero (born 17 January 1990) is a Colombian professional footballer who plays as a striker for Brazilian club Operário-PR.

== Club career ==
=== Early career ===
Born in Medellín, Tréllez started his career with Envigado before moving to hometown club Independiente Medellín. After impressing during the 2007 South American Under-17 Football Championship and the 2007 FIFA U-17 World Cup, he joined Flamengo, but documentation and financial problems limited his appearances.

In 2008, Tréllez joined Vélez Sarsfield; initially playing for the reserves, he was only a backup option to starter Santiago Silva, and later suffered a knee injury which kept him out for several months. After not making his first team breakthrough, he returned to Colombia and Independiente Medellín, agreeing to a contract with the club in January 2011.

Tréllez made his debut for the club on 6 February 2011, starting in a 2–1 away loss against Itagüí Ditaires. Late in the month he scored his first senior goals, netting a brace in a 3–3 home draw against Millonarios.

=== Mexico ===
On 10 July 2012, Tréllez switched teams and countries again, after signing for Liga MX side San Luis. A regular starter, he was sold to Chiapas and immediately loaned to Monarcas Morelia for one year; a backup for the latter in the league, he featured regularly in the Copa MX as his side was crowned champions.

=== Atlético Nacional and loans ===
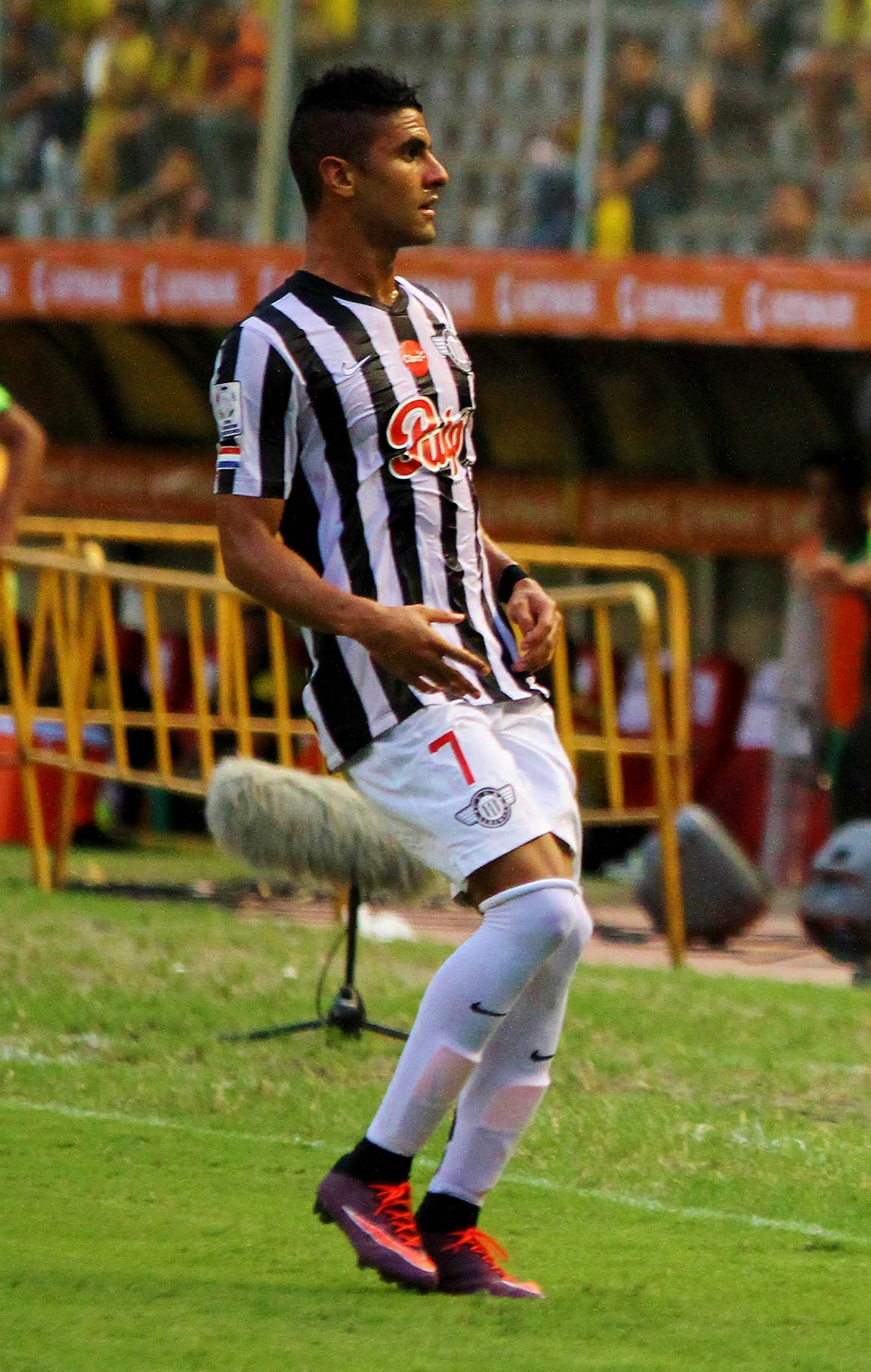
Tréllez in action with Libertad in 2015

On 14 January 2014, Tréllez was loaned to Atlético Nacional for one-year, with a buyout clause. He was bought outright by the club in the following year, but was loaned to Libertad on 17 January 2015.

=== Arsenal de Sarandí ===
Tréllez rescinded with Libertad in July 2015, and subsequently signed a one-year contract with Arsenal de Sarandí. The following 12 January, after only two goals in seven matches, he was loaned to La Equidad for one year.

=== Deportivo Pasto ===
On 21 February 2017, Tréllez was announced at Deportivo Pasto. An immediate starter, he scored nine times in 17 matches; highlights included braces against Cortuluá, Independiente Santa Fe and Once Caldas.

=== Vitória ===
On 17 July 2017, Tréllez signed an 18-month contract with Série A team Vitória. He made his debut for the club three days later by starting in a 3–1 home loss against Grêmio, and scored his first goals on 3 August in a 3–1 home defeat of Ponte Preta.

On 19 August 2017, Tréllez scored the only goal in an away success over Corinthians, ending the club's 34-match unbeaten run. On 26 November, he scored another brace against Ponte, netting twice in the 3–2 away win but later being booked and subsequently suspended for the last round; the club still managed to avoid relegation nonetheless.

=== São Paulo ===
On 27 January 2018, it was announced that São Paulo has reached an agreement with Vitória for the signing of Tréllez. Tricolor Paulista paid R$ 6 million to Rubro-Negro Baiano to sign with them new forward, under a four-year contract

== Personal life ==
Tréllez is the son of the Colombian international footballer John Jairo Tréllez.

== Career statistics ==
As of match played on 30 December 2020

Club	Season	League			Cup		Continental		Other		Total	
Club	Season	Division	Apps	Goals	Apps	Goals	Apps	Goals	Apps	Goals	Apps	Goals
Independiente Medellín	2011	Categoría Primera A	33	8	5	3	—		—		48	11
Independiente Medellín	2012	Categoría Primera A	16	3	3	2	—		—		19	5
Independiente Medellín	Subtotal		49	11	8	5	—		—		67	16
San Luis	2012–13	Liga MX	27	4	2	2	—		—		29	6
Morelia	2013–14	Liga MX	9	0	7	2	—		—		16	2
Atlético Nacional	2014	Categoría Primera A	23	2	10	1	8 (Note: Four appearances and one goal in Copa Libertadores, four appearances and one goal in Copa Sudamericana)	2	—		41	5
Libertad	2015	Primera División	17	3	—		6 (Note: Appearance(s) in Copa Libertadores)	1	—		23	4
Arsenal de Sarandí	2015	Primera División	7	2	—		2 (Note: Appearance(s) in Copa Sudamericana)	0	—		9	2
La Equidad	2016	Categoría Primera A	28	3	5	1	—		—		33	4
Deportivo Pasto	2017	Categoría Primera A	17	9	0	0	—		—		17	9
Vitória	2017	Série A	23	10	1	0	—		2 (Note: Appearances in Campeonato Baiano)	0	26	10
São Paulo	2018	Série A	23	4	3	1	3 (Note: Appearances in Copa Sudamericana)	0	9 (Note: Appearances in Campeonato Paulista)	1	38	6
São Paulo	2020	Série A	4	0	0	0	3 (Note: Appearances in Copa Libertadores)	1	1	0	8	1
São Paulo	Subtotal		27	4	3	1	6	1	10	1	46	7
Internacional	2019	Série A	4	0	0	0	0	0	9 (Note: Appearances in Campeonato Gaúcho)	0	13	0
Total			231	48	36	12	22	4	21	1	310	65

== Honours ==
=== Club ===
Monarcas Morelia

- Copa MX: Apertura 2013

Atlético Nacional

- Categoría Primera A: 2014-I

Vitória Esporte Clube

- Campeonato Brasileiro Série B de 2023: Brasileirão série B 2023
