= Villa Rica, Cauca =

Coordinates: 2°31′N 76°51′W

Villarrica, Cauca Villarrica
- Municipality and town
- Flag Coat of arms

- Location of the municipality and town of Villarrica, in the Cauca Department of Colombia.
- Country: Colombia
- Department: Cauca Department

Area
  - Total: 78 km^{2} (30 sq mi)
- Elevation: 982 m (3,222 ft)

Population (Census 2018)
  - Total: 18,761
  - Density: 240/km^{2} (620/sq mi)
- Time zone: UTC-5 (Colombia Standard Time)

Villa Rica is a town and municipality in the Cauca Department, Colombia. The municipality has a Baháʼí House of Worship in the vereda Agua Azul.
