= Marcos Vizolli =

Brazilian footballer

Personal information
- Full name: Marcos César Vizolli
- Date of birth: 26 March 1965 (age 61)
- Place of birth: São Paulo, Brazil
- Height: 1.84 m (6 ft 0 in)
- Position: Midfielder

Team information
- Current team: São Paulo (youth)

Youth career
- 1978–1984: São Paulo

Senior career*
Years	Team	Apps	(Gls)
1984–1991	São Paulo	84	(4)
1986	→ Paulista (loan)		
1988	→ XV de Piracicaba (loan)		
1988–1989	→ Yomiuri (loan)		
1991–1992	Xanthi		
1992	Marília	10	(1)
1993	Juventus-SP		
1993	Paysandu		
1995	São José-SP		

Managerial career
- 1997–2009: São Paulo U20
- 2004: São Paulo B
- 2016: São Paulo U20
- 2017–2019: São Paulo U23
- 2020–: São Paulo (assistant)
- 2021: São Paulo (interim)
- 2021–: São Paulo (youth)
- * Club domestic league appearances and goals

Marcos César Vizolli (born 26 March 1965), sometimes known as just Vizolli, is a Brazilian football manager and former player who played as a midfielder. He is the current assistant manager of São Paulo.

== Playing career ==
Born in São Paulo, Vizolli joined São Paulo FC's youth setup in 1978, and first appeared in the main squad in 1984. After failing to establish himself as a regular starter, he was loaned to Paulista in 1986, for the Campeonato Paulista.

Vizolli returned to Tricolor in 1987, but was again loaned in 1988, to XV de Piracicaba and then Japan's Yomiuri FC. He returned in the following year, and then became a regular starter before leaving for Xanthi in 1991.

Vizolli returned to Brazil in 1992 to play for Marília. He subsequently represented Juventus-SP, Paysandu and São José-SP before retiring in 1995.

== Managerial career ==
Vizolli returned to São Paulo in 1997, to work in the club's youth categories. He was also the manager of the B-team in the 2004 season before leaving the club in 2009.

Vizolli rejoined São Paulo in 2016, managing in the club's under-20 and under-23 sides. On 27 December 2019, he was named permanent assistant manager of the first team.

On 1 February 2021, Vizolli was named interim manager of São Paulo for the remainder of the season, in the place of sacked Fernando Diniz.

== Managerial statistics ==
As of 10 November 2021.

Managerial record by team and tenure
Team	Nat	From	To	Record								Ref
Team	Nat	From	To	G	W	D	L	GF	GA	GD	Win %	Ref
São Paulo (interim)	(Brazil)	1 February 2021	25 February 2021	5	2	2	1	6	5	+1	40.00	
Total				5	2	2	1	6	5	+1	40.00	—

== Honours ==
=== Player ===
São Paulo

- Campeonato Brasileiro Série A: 1986, 1991
- Campeonato Paulista: 1985, 1987, 1989

=== Manager ===
São Paulo U23

- Campeonato Brasileiro de Aspirantes: 2018
