= Gabriel Dias (footballer) =

Brazilian footballer (born 1994)

Personal information
- Full name: Gabriel Dias de Oliveira
- Date of birth: 10 May 1994 (age 32)
- Place of birth: Francisco Morato, São Paulo, Brazil
- Height: 1.79 m (5 ft 10 in)
- Positions: Right back; defensive midfielder

Team information
- Current team: Inter de Limeira
- Number: 21

Youth career
- 2007–2008: Bandeirante
- 2008–2012: Palmeiras

Senior career*
Years	Team	Apps	(Gls)
2012–2013	Palmeiras B	10	(0)
2014–2017	Palmeiras	5	(0)
2015	→ Boa Esporte (loan)	20	(0)
2016	→ Mogi Mirim (loan)	13	(0)
2016	→ Bragantino (loan)	22	(3)
2017	→ Paraná (loan)	37	(3)
2018	Internacional	24	(0)
2019–2021	Fortaleza	85	(4)
2021	Ceará	31	(2)
2022	Cruzeiro	3	(0)
2022–2023	Vasco da Gama	14	(0)
2024	Avaí	5	(0)
2026–	Inter de Limeira	20	(2)
- * Club domestic league appearances and goals as of 9 November 2026

Gabriel Dias de Oliveira (born 10 May 1994), known as Gabriel Dias, is a Brazilian footballer who plays as either a right back or a defensive midfielder for Inter de Limeira.

== Career ==
=== Palmeiras ===
Gabriel Dias made his league debut for Palmeiras B against Monte Azul on 21 March 2012.

Gabriel Dias made his league debut for Palmeiras against Coritiba on 24 August 2014.

=== Boa Esporte ===
Gabriel Dias made his league debut against América Mineiro on 14 March 2015.

=== Mogi Mirim ===
Gabriel Dias made his league debut against Osasco Audax on 31 January 2016.

=== Bragantino ===
Gabriel Dias made his league debut against Náutico on 18 June 2016. He scored his first goal for the club against Ceará on 29 June 2016, scoring in the 12th minute.

=== Paraná ===
Gabriel Dias made his league debut against Avaí on 25 January 2017. He scored his first goal for the club against Toledo on 26 March 2017, scoring in the 35th minute.

=== Internacional ===
Gabriel Dias made his league debut against Veranópolis on 18 January 2018.

=== Fortaleza ===
Gabriel Dias joined Fortaleza on 24 January 2019. He made his league debut against Botafogo PB on 2 February 2019. He scored his first goals for the club against Atlético Mineiro on 2 November 2019, scoring in the 15th and 28th minute.

=== Ceará ===
Gabriel Dias made his league debut against CSA on 31 March 2021. He scored his first goal for the club against Sport Recife on 3 April 2021, scoring in the 30th minute.

=== Cruzeiro ===
Gabriel Dias was expected to join Cruzeiro and did in 2022.Journal, NorthEast (10 January 2022). "Ex-Ceará, lateral-direito Gabriel Dias deve jogar no Cruzeiro". Diariodonordeste. He made his league debut against URT on 26 January 2022.

=== Vasco da Gama ===
Gabriel Dias joined Vasco da Gama on 6 April 2022. He made his league debut against CRB on 16 April 2022. He was injured and underwent surgery on his right knee in June 2022.

=== Avaí ===
Gabriel Dias made his league debut against Criciúma on 12 February 2024.

== Honours ==
Fortaleza

- Campeonato Cearense: 2019, 2020
- Copa do Nordeste: 2019

Avaí

- Campeonato Catarinense: 2025
