= Andrey Lopes =

Brazilian football manager (born 1973)

Personal information
- Full name: Andrey Lopes dos Santos
- Date of birth: 18 October 1973 (age 53)
- Place of birth: Porto Alegre, Brazil

Team information
- Current team: Palmeiras (assistant)

Managerial career
- Years: Team
- 1995–2005: Internacional (youth)
- 2006: Ulbra U20
- 2007–2010: Grêmio U20
- 2010–2011: Grêmio (assistant)
- 2012: Cerâmica U20
- 2013: Internacional (assistant)
- 2014–2016: Brazil (assistant)
- 2018–: Palmeiras (assistant)
- 2019: Palmeiras (interim)
- 2020: Palmeiras (interim)

Andrey Lopes dos Santos (born 18 October 1973) is a Brazilian football manager, and is the current assistant manager of Palmeiras.

== Career ==
Born in Porto Alegre, Rio Grande do Sul, Lopes started working at Internacional's youth categories in 1995. In 2006, he moved to Ulbra, being in charge of the under-20 squad.

Lopes joined Grêmio in 2007, taking over the under-20s. On 7 September 2010, he was named Renato Portaluppi's assistant at the main squad, but returned to his previous role the following 4 August.

Dismissed by Grêmio in 2012, Lopes was manager of Cerâmica's under-20s for a short period before joining Dunga's staff back at Internacional in December of that year. On 22 July 2014, after Dunga was named manager of the Brazil national team, Lopes was again appointed as his assistant. He left in October of the following year, after Dunga was fired, and was named assistant at Palmeiras on 12 December 2017.

On 2 December 2019, Lopes was appointed interim manager of Palmeiras, replacing sacked Mano Menezes. His first match in charge occurred three days later, a 5–1 home routing of Goiás. He worked in another match before returning to his previous role.

On 15 October 2020, Lopes was again named interim after the dismissal of Vanderlei Luxemburgo.
