= 2010–11 FC Porto season =

Porto
2010–11 season
- Chairman: Pinto da Costa
- Manager: André Villas-Boas
- Primeira Liga: 1st
- Taça de Portugal: Winners
- Taça da Liga: Third round
- Supertaça Cândido de Oliveira: Winners
- UEFA Europa League: Winners
- Top goalscorer: League: Hulk (23); All: Radamel Falcao (39)
- Highest home attendance: 49,817 vs Benfica
- Lowest home attendance: 18,912 vs V. Setúbal
| Home colours | Away colours |

The 2010–11 season is Futebol Clube do Porto's 77th season in the Primeira Liga, officially known as the Liga ZON Sagres for sponsorship reasons. Porto captured their 25th league title with their 3 April defeat of rivals Benfica and won the Europa League. The team also won the Taça de Portugal, completing a treble. Manager Jesualdo Ferreira left Porto by mutual agreement after four years in charge, replaced by André Villas-Boas on 2 July.

== Team kits ==
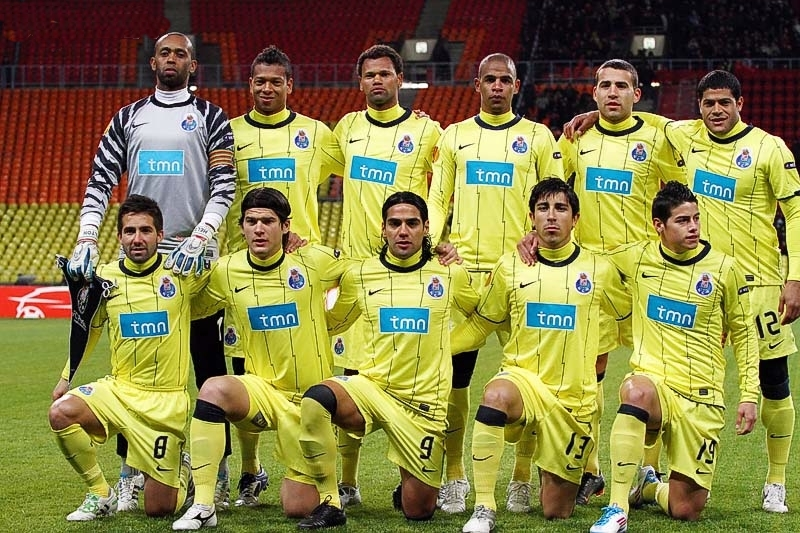
Porto's team wearing the away kit.

The team kits for the 2010–11 season were produced by Nike. The home kit was revealed on 24 July 2011. This kit is a reinterpretation of the traditional blue and white stripes in order to guarantee a 3D effect. The away kit is orange for the first time since the 2005–06 season, and was revealed on 18 July 2011. Both kits were made entirely from polyester. This environmentally-friendly move see each shirt made from up to eight recycled plastic bottles.

| Home | Away |

== Squad ==
=== First team squad ===
As of 15 September 2011.

| No. | Name | Nationality | Position (s) | Date of birth (Age at the start of the season) | Signed from |
Goalkeepers
| 1 | Helton | (Brazil) | GK | 18 May 1978 (aged 32) | (Portugal) União de Leiria |
| 24 | Beto | (Portugal) | GK | 1 May 1982 (aged 28) | (Portugal) Leixões |
| 31 | Paweł Kieszek | (Poland) | GK | 16 April 1984 (aged 26) | (Portugal) Braga |
Defenders
| 13 | Jorge Fucile | (Uruguay) | RB / LB | 19 November 1984 (aged 25) | (Uruguay) Liverpool |
| 4 | Maicon | (Brazil) | CB | 14 September 1988 (aged 21) | (Portugal) Nacional |
| 5 | Álvaro Pereira | (Uruguay) | LB / LM | 28 November 1985 (aged 24) | (Romania) CFR Cluj |
| 14 | Rolando | (Portugal) | CB | 31 August 1985 (aged 24) | (Portugal) Belenenses |
| 15 | Emídio Rafael | (Portugal) | LB | 24 January 1986 (aged 24) | (Portugal) Académica de Coimbra |
| 16 | Henrique Sereno | (Portugal) | CB | 18 May 1985 (aged 25) | (Spain) Real Valladolid |
| 21 | Cristian Săpunaru | (Romania) | RB / CB | 5 April 1984 (aged 26) | (Romania) Rapid București |
| 30 | Nicolás Otamendi | (Argentina) | CB | 12 February 1988 (aged 22) | (Argentina) Vélez Sársfield |
Midfielders
| 23 | Souza | (Brazil) | DM | 11 February 1989 (aged 21) | (Brazil) Vasco da Gama |
| 6 | Fredy Guarín | (Colombia) | CM / DM / AM | 30 June 1986 (aged 24) | (France) Saint-Étienne |
| 7 | Fernando Belluschi | (Argentina) | AM | 10 September 1983 (aged 26) | (Greece) Olympiacos |
| 8 | João Moutinho | (Portugal) | CM | 8 September 1986 (aged 23) | (Portugal) Sporting CP |
| 10 | Cristian Rodríguez | (Uruguay) | LM / LW | 30 September 1985 (aged 24) | (France) Paris Saint-Germain |
| 11 | Mariano González | (Argentina) | AM / LW | 5 May 1981 (aged 29) | (Italy) Palermo |
| 19 | James Rodríguez | (Colombia) | LM / LW | 12 July 1991 (aged 19) | (Argentina) Banfield |
| 25 | Fernando | (Brazil) | DM | 25 July 1987 (aged 23) | (Brazil) Vila Nova |
| 28 | Rúben Micael | (Portugal) | AM | 19 August 1986 (aged 23) | (Portugal) Nacional |
Forwards
| 9 | Radamel Falcao | (Colombia) | CF / ST | 10 February 1986 (aged 24) | (Argentina) River Plate |
| 12 | Hulk | (Brazil) | ST / RW | 25 July 1986 (aged 24) | (Japan) Tokyo Verdy |
| 17 | Silvestre Varela | (Portugal) | LW / RW | 2 February 1985 (aged 25) | (Portugal) Estrela da Amadora |
| 18 | Walter | (Brazil) | CF / ST | 22 July 1989 (aged 21) | (Brazil) Internacional |

== Transfers ==
=== Transfers in ===
| Squad # | Position (s) | Nationality | Name | Transferred From | Fee | Date | Source |
|---|---|---|---|---|---|---|---|
| 23 | DM | (Brazil) | Souza | (Brazil) Vasco da Gama | €3,500,000 | 22 June 2010 | |
| 16 | CB | (Portugal) | Henrique Sereno | (Spain) Real Valladolid | Free | 1 July 2010 | |
| 19 | LM / LW | (Colombia) | James Rodríguez | (Argentina) Banfield | €5,100,000 | 6 July 2010 | |
| 31 | GK | (Poland) | Paweł Kieszek | (Portugal) Braga | Free | 2 July 2010 | |
| 8 | CM | (Portugal) | João Moutinho | (Portugal) Sporting CP | €10,000,000 | 5 July 2010 | |
| 15 | LB | (Portugal) | Emídio Rafael | (Portugal) Académica de Coimbra | €500,000 | 10 July | |
| 18 | CF / ST | (Brazil) | Walter | (Brazil) Internacional | €6,000,000 | 28 July 2010 | |
| 30 | CB | (Argentina) | Nicolás Otamendi | (Argentina) Vélez Sársfield | €4,000,000 | 23 August 2010 | |

Total spending: ▼€29,100,000

=== Transfers out ===
| Squad # | Position (s) | Nationality | Name | Transferred To | Fee | Date | Source |
|---|---|---|---|---|---|---|---|
| 33 | GK | (Portugal) | Nuno | Unattached | Retired | 21 June 2010 | |
| - | CB | (Portugal) | Nuno André Coelho | (Portugal) Sporting CP | €1,000,000 | 5 July 2010 | |
| - | CM | (Portugal) | Pelé | (Turkey) Eskişehirspor | €420,000 | 10 July 2010 | |
| 19 | CF / ST | (Argentina) | Ernesto Farías | (Brazil) Cruzeiro | 50% of Maicon's rights | 22 July 2010 | |
| 2 | CB | (Portugal) | Bruno Alves | (Russia) Zenit Saint Petersburg | €22,000,000 | 3 August 2010 | |
| 4 | CB | (Serbia) | Milan Stepanov | (Turkey) Bursaspor | Free | 5 August | |
| 3 | CM | (Portugal) | Raul Meireles | (England) Liverpool | €13,000,000 | 29 August | |

Total income: ▲€36,420,000

== Statistics ==
=== Appearances and goals ===
| No. | Pos | Nat | Player | Total | | Primeira Liga | | Europa League | | Taça de Portugal | | Taça da Liga | |
| No. | Pos | Nat | Player | Apps | Goals | Apps | Goals | Apps | Goals | Apps | Goals | Apps | Goals |
|---|---|---|---|---|---|---|---|---|---|---|---|---|---|
| 1 | GK | (Brazil) BRA | Helton | 42 | -25 | 25+0 | -9 | 15+0 | -14 | 1+0 | -2 | 1+0 | 0 |
| 4 | DF | (Brazil) BRA | Maicon | 35 | 3 | 18+3 | 2 | 7+1 | 1 | 4+0 | 0 | 2+0 | 0 |
| 5 | DF | (Uruguay) URU | Álvaro Pereira | 36 | 1 | 21+0 | 0 | 12+1 | 0 | 2+0 | 1 | 0+0 | 0 |
| 6 | MF | (Colombia) COL | Fredy Guarín | 42 | 10 | 12+10 | 5 | 7+6 | 5 | 3+2 | 0 | 2+0 | 0 |
| 7 | MF | (Argentina) ARG | Fernando Belluschi | 43 | 3 | 23+3 | 2 | 7+5 | 1 | 3+0 | 0 | 0+2 | 0 |
| 8 | MF | (Portugal) POR | João Moutinho | 48 | 2 | 26+1 | 0 | 14+2 | 0 | 2+0 | 2 | 2+1 | 0 |
| 9 | FW | (Colombia) COL | Radamel Falcao | 42 | 39 | 22+0 | 16 | 15+0 | 18 | 2+1 | 4 | 1+1 | 1 |
| 10 | MF | (Uruguay) URU | Cristian Rodríguez | 27 | 2 | 1+12 | 1 | 7+4 | 1 | 1+1 | 0 | 1+0 | 0 |
| 11 | MF | (Argentina) ARG | Mariano González | 12 | 0 | 1+9 | 0 | 0+0 | 0 | 0+0 | 0 | 1+1 | 0 |
| 12 | FW | (Brazil) BRA | Hulk | 50 | 35 | 26+0 | 23 | 14+1 | 8 | 6+0 | 3 | 2+1 | 1 |
| 13 | DF | (Uruguay) URU | Jorge Fucile | 29 | 0 | 11+5 | 0 | 10+0 | 0 | 0+0 | 0 | 3+0 | 0 |
| 14 | DF | (Portugal) POR | Rolando | 48 | 2 | 29+0 | 0 | 14+0 | 2 | 4+0 | 0 | 1+0 | 0 |
| 15 | DF | (Portugal) POR | Emídio Rafael | 11 | 2 | 5+0 | 0 | 0+0 | 0 | 3+0 | 0 | 2+1 | 2 |
| 16 | DF | (Portugal) POR | Henrique Sereno | 13 | 0 | 5+2 | 0 | 0+0 | 0 | 3+1 | 0 | 2+0 | 0 |
| 17 | FW | (Portugal) POR | Silvestre Varela | 40 | 12 | 25+0 | 10 | 5+6 | 1 | 2+2 | 1 | 0+0 | 0 |
| 18 | FW | (Brazil) BRA | Walter | 24 | 10 | 3+10 | 5 | 1+3 | 0 | 2+2 | 4 | 3+0 | 1 |
| 19 | MF | (Colombia) COL | James Rodríguez | 30 | 3 | 10+5 | 2 | 4+4 | 1 | 3+2 | 0 | 2+0 | 0 |
| 21 | DF | (Romania) ROU | Cristian Săpunaru | 38 | 0 | 18+1 | 0 | 10+2 | 0 | 6+0 | 0 | 0+1 | 0 |
| 23 | MF | (Brazil) BRA | Souza | 22 | 1 | 4+8 | 0 | 3+4 | 1 | 1+0 | 0 | 2+0 | 0 |
| 24 | GK | (Portugal) POR | Beto | 11 | -6 | 5+1 | 0 | 1+0 | -2 | 3+0 | -2 | 1+0 | -2 |
| 25 | MF | (Brazil) BRA | Fernando | 38 | 2 | 18+3 | 0 | 13+0 | 1 | 3+0 | 0 | 1+0 | 1 |
| 26 | MF | (Portugal) POR | André Castro | 6 | 0 | 0+1 | 0 | 0+2 | 0 | 0+3 | 0 | 0+0 | 0 |
| 27 | FW | (Portugal) POR | Ukra | 8 | 0 | 1+1 | 0 | 1+1 | 0 | 1+2 | 0 | 0+1 | 0 |
| 28 | MF | (Portugal) POR | Rúben Micael | 35 | 4 | 8+11 | 0 | 5+2 | 3 | 4+2 | 0 | 2+1 | 1 |
| 30 | DF | (Argentina) ARG | Nicolás Otamendi | 31 | 6 | 13+2 | 5 | 11+1 | 1 | 2+0 | 0 | 2+0 | 0 |
| 31 | GK | (Poland) POL | Paweł Kieszek | 3 | -2 | 0+0 | 0 | 0+0 | 0 | 2+0 | 0 | 1+0 | -2 |

Last updated: 16 May 2011
Source: Match reports in Competitive matches

=== Top scorers ===
Includes all competitive matches. The list is sorted by shirt number when total goals are equal.

| Position | Nation | Number | Name | Primeira Liga | Europa League | Taça de Portugal | Taça da Liga | Super Cup | Total |
|---|---|---|---|---|---|---|---|---|---|
| 1 | (Colombia) | 9 | Radamel Falcao | 16 | 18 | 4 | 0 | 1 | 39 |
| 2 | (Brazil) | 12 | Hulk | 23 | 8 | 3 | 1 | 0 | 35 |
| 3 | (Portugal) | 17 | Silvestre Varela | 10 | 1 | 1 | 0 | 0 | 12 |
| 4 | (Brazil) | 18 | Walter | 5 | 0 | 4 | 1 | 0 | 10 |
| = | (Colombia) | 6 | Fredy Guarín | 5 | 5 | 0 | 0 | 0 | 10 |
| 6 | (Argentina) | 30 | Nicolás Otamendi | 5 | 1 | 0 | 0 | 0 | 6 |
| 7 | (Portugal) | 28 | Rúben Micael | 0 | 3 | 0 | 1 | 0 | 4 |
| 8 | (Colombia) | 19 | James Rodríguez | 2 | 1 | 3 | 0 | 0 | 6 |
| = | (Argentina) | 7 | Fernando Belluschi | 2 | 1 | 0 | 0 | 0 | 3 |
| = | (Brazil) | 4 | Maicon | 2 | 1 | 0 | 0 | 0 | 3 |
| = | (Portugal) | 14 | Rolando | 0 | 2 | 0 | 0 | 1 | 3 |
| = | (Uruguay) | 10 | Cristian Rodríguez | 1 | 1 | 0 | 0 | 1 | 3 |
| 13 | (Brazil) | 25 | Fernando | 0 | 1 | 0 | 1 | 0 | 2 |
| = | (Portugal) | 8 | João Moutinho | 0 | 0 | 2 | 0 | 0 | 2 |
| = | (Portugal) | 15 | Emídio Rafael | 0 | 0 | 0 | 2 | 0 | 2 |
| 16 | (Brazil) | 23 | Souza | 0 | 1 | 0 | 0 | 0 | 1 |
| 17 | (Uruguay) | 5 | Álvaro Pereira | 0 | 0 | 1 | 0 | 0 | 1 |
| / | / | / | Own goals | 0 | 0 | 0 | 0 | 0 | 0 |
| | | | TOTALS | 71 | 43 | 14 | 6 | 2 | 136 |

Last updated: 16 May 2011
Source: Match reports in Competitive matches

=== Disciplinary record ===
Includes all competitive matches. Players with 1 card or more included only.

| Position | Nation | Number | Name | Primeira Liga | | Europa League | | Taça de Portugal | | Taça da Liga | | Total | |
| Position | Nation | Number | Name | Booked | Sent off (straight red) | Booked | Sent off (straight red) | Booked | Sent off (straight red) | Booked | Sent off (straight red) | Booked | Sent off (straight red) |
| GK | (Brazil) | 1 | Helton | 4 | | 2 | | | | | | 6 | |
| DF | (Brazil) | 4 | Maicon | 3 | 1 | 2 | 1 | 1 | | | | 6 | 2 |
| DF | (Uruguay) | 5 | Álvaro Pereira | 6 | | 2 | | 1 | | | | 9 | |
| MF | (Colombia) | 6 | Fredy Guarín | 4 | | 1 | | 2 | | | | 7 | |
| MF | (Argentina) | 7 | Fernando Belluschi | 8 | | 1 | | | | | | 9 | |
| MF | (Portugal) | 8 | João Moutinho | 9 | | 1 | | 1 | | | | 11 | |
| FW | (Colombia) | 9 | Radamel Falcao | 1 | | 1 | | 1 | | | | 3 | |
| MF | (Uruguay) | 10 | Cristian Rodríguez | 1 | | 3 | 1 | 1 | | | | 5 | 1 |
| FW | (Brazil) | 12 | Hulk | 7 | | | | 2 | | 1 | | 10 | |
| DF | (Uruguay) | 13 | Jorge Fucile | 7 | 1 | 1 | | | | 1 | | 9 | 1 |
| DF | (Portugal) | 14 | Rolando | 4 | | 1 | | 2 | | | | 7 | |
| DF | (Portugal) | 15 | Emídio Rafael | 2 | | | | 1 | | | | 3 | |
| DF | (Portugal) | 16 | Henrique Sereno | 2 | | | | 2 | | 1 | | 5 | |
| MF | (Portugal) | 17 | Silvestre Varela | 1 | | | | 1 | | | | 2 | |
| FW | (Brazil) | 18 | Walter | 2 | | | | 1 | | 1 | | 4 | |
| MF | (Colombia) | 19 | James Rodríguez | 2 | | 1 | | 1 | | | | 4 | |
| DF | (Romania) | 21 | Cristian Săpunaru | 5 | | 2 | | 3 | 1 | | | 10 | 1 |
| MF | (Brazil) | 23 | Souza | 1 | | | | 1 | | 1 | | 3 | |
| GK | (Portugal) | 24 | Beto | | | | | 1 | | | | 1 | |
| MF | (Brazil) | 25 | Fernando | 4 | | 4 | 1 | 1 | | 1 | | 10 | 1 |
| MF | (Portugal) | 28 | Rúben Micael | 2 | | 1 | | 1 | | | | 4 | |
| DF | (Argentina) | 30 | Nicolás Otamendi | 6 | 1 | 2 | | | | 1 | | 9 | 1 |
| | | | TOTALS | 81 | 3 | 26 | 3 | 24 | 1 | 7 | 0 | 138 | 7 |

Last updated: 16 May 2011
Source: Match reports in Competitive matches

== Club ==
=== Technical staff ===
| Position | Staff |
|---|---|
| Head Coach | (Portugal) André Villas-Boas |
| Assistant Coach | (Portugal) Víctorio Pereira da Silva (Portugal) Pedro Emanuel (Portugal) José Mario Rocha Gomes |
| Goalkeeping Coach | (Netherlands) Will Coort |

Last updated: June 2010

=== Medical staff ===
| Position | Staff |
|---|---|
| Doctor | (Portugal) José Carlos Esteves (Portugal) Nélson Puga |
| Nurse | (Portugal) José Mário (Portugal) Eduardo Braga (Portugal) José Luís |
| Physioterapist | (Portugal) Ângelo Castro |

Last updated: June 2010
Source: FCPorto.pt

=== Board of directors ===
| Position | Staff |
|---|---|
| President | (Portugal) Pinto da Costa |
| Vice-President | (Portugal) Reinaldo Teles |
| Chief Administrative | (Portugal) Adelino Caldeira |
| Chief Executive | (Portugal) Antero Henrique |
| Chief Financial | (Portugal) Angelino Ferreira |

Last updated: June 2010
Source: FCPorto.p

== Pre-season ==
| Date | Match Type | Opponents | H / A | Result | Scorer(s) | Attendance |
|---|---|---|---|---|---|---|
| 8 July | Friendly | Tourizense | CTFD PortoGaia | 4–1 | Castro, J. Rodríguez, Falcao, Hulk | – |
| 11 July | Friendly | Preußen Münster | Marienfeld | 1–1 | Hulk | 3,000 |
| 15 July | Friendly | Trabzonspor | Marienfeld | 1–0 | Hulk | 2,500 |
| 18 July | Friendly | Ajax | Estádio do Dragão | 1–0 | J. Rodríguez | 40,207 |
| 25 July | Friendly | Sampdoria | Estádio do Dragão | 2–1 | Hulk, Fernando | 39,425 |
| 31 July | Tournament of Paris | Paris Saint-Germain | Parc des Princes | 0–1 | | 10,000 |
| 1 August | Tournament of Paris | Bordeaux | Parc des Princes | 1–2 | Walter |

== Competitions ==
=== Supertaça Cândido de Oliveira ===
7 August 2010
20:45 GMT

| Porto (Portugal) | 2–0 | (Portugal) Benfica |
|---|---|---|
| Rolando 3'; Pereira (yellow card) 56'; Falcao 67'; Moutinho (yellow card) 76'; Helton (yellow card) 86' | (Report) | Luisão (yellow card) 47'; Aimar (yellow card) 51'; David Luiz (yellow card) 57'; Jara (yellow card) 63' |

Municipal de Aveiro, Aveiro
Attendance: 28,000
Referee: João Ferreira

=== Primeira Liga ===
==== League table ====
| Pos | Team | Pld | W | D | L | GF | GA | GD | Pts | Qualification or relegation |
|---|---|---|---|---|---|---|---|---|---|---|
| 1 | Porto (C) | 30 | 27 | 3 | 0 | 73 | 16 | +57 | 84 | Qualification to Champions League group stage |
| 2 | Benfica | 30 | 20 | 3 | 7 | 61 | 31 | +30 | 63 | Qualification to Champions League third qualifying round |
| 3 | Sporting CP | 30 | 13 | 9 | 8 | 41 | 31 | +10 | 48 | Qualification to Europa League play-off round |
| 4 | Braga | 30 | 13 | 7 | 10 | 45 | 33 | +12 | 46 | Qualification to Europa League play-off round |
| 5 | Vitória de Guimarães | 30 | 12 | 7 | 11 | 36 | 37 | −1 | 43 | Qualification to Europa League third qualifying round |

Source: LPFP (in Portuguese)
Rules for classification: 1) Points; 2) Head-to-head points; 3) Head-to-head goal difference; 4) Head-to-head away goals scored; 5) Goal difference; 6) Matches won; 7) Goals scored; 8) Play-off.
(Note: LPFP decided that only criteria 1, 5, 6 and 7 would be applied to establish the classification during the competition.)
(C) Champions

==== Results summary ====
| Overall | | | | | | | | Home | | | | | | Away | | | | | |
| Pld | W | D | L | GF | GA | GD | Pts | W | D | L | GF | GA | GD | W | D | L | GF | GA | GD |
|---|---|---|---|---|---|---|---|---|---|---|---|---|---|---|---|---|---|---|---|
| 30 | 27 | 3 | 0 | 73 | 16 | +57 | 84 | 14 | 1 | 0 | 43 | 11 | +32 | 13 | 2 | 0 | 30 | 5 | +25 |

Last updated: 14 May 2011.
Source: Liga ZON Sagres

==== Results by round ====
| Round | 1 | 2 | 3 | 4 | 5 | 6 | 7 | 8 | 9 | 10 | 11 | 12 | 13 | 14 | 15 | 16 | 17 | 18 | 19 | 20 | 21 | 22 | 23 | 24 | 25 | 26 | 27 | 28 | 29 | 30 |
|---|---|---|---|---|---|---|---|---|---|---|---|---|---|---|---|---|---|---|---|---|---|---|---|---|---|---|---|---|---|---|
| Ground | A | H | A | H | A | H | A | H | A | H | H | A | H | A | H | H | A | H | A | H | A | H | A | H | A | A | H | A | H | A |
| Result | W | W | W | W | W | W | D | W | W | W | W | D | W | W | W | W | W | W | W | W | W | W | W | W | W | W | W | W | D | W |
| Position | 3 | 1 | 1 | 1 | 1 | 1 | 1 | 1 | 1 | 1 | 1 | 1 | 1 | 1 | 1 | 1 | 1 | 1 | 1 | 1 | 1 | 1 | 1 | 1 | 1 | 1 | 1 | 1 | 1 | 1 |

Updated to match(es) played on 15 April. Source: Matches
A = Away; H = Home; W = Win; D = Draw; L = Loss

==== Matches ====
Kickoff times are in GMT.

Win Draw Loss

| 14 August 2010 1 | Naval | 0–1 | Porto | Figueira da Foz |
| 19:45 GMT | Carlitos (yellow card) 63'; Johnathas (yellow card) 82' | (Report) | Hulk (yellow card) 66', (goal) 83' (pen.); Guarín (yellow card) 74' | Stadium: Estádio Municipal José Bento Pessoa; Attendance: 4,972; Referee: Paulo Baptista |

| 22 August 2010 2 | Porto | 3–0 | Beira-Mar | Porto |
| 20:30 GMT | Falcao 26', 81'; Belluschi 45+1' | (Report) | Hugo (yellow card) 13' | Stadium: Estádio do Dragão; Attendance: 43,209; Referee: João Capela |

| 29 August 2010 3 | Rio Ave | 0–2 | Porto | Vila do Conde |
| 20:15 GMT | Tarantini (yellow card) 40'; Saulo (yellow card) 49' | (Report) | Hulk 22', 65'; Belluschi (yellow card) 76' | Stadium: Estádio do Rio Ave FC; Attendance: 5,064; Referee: Jorge Sousa |

| 11 September 2010 4 | Porto | 3–2 | Braga | Porto |
| 21:15 GMT | Fernando (yellow card) 15'; Varela 33', 70'; Moutinho (yellow card) 56'; Hulk 63'; Belluschi (yellow card) 81'; Săpunaru (yellow card) 89' | (Report) | Aguiar 16'; Rodríguez (yellow card) 36'; Paulo César (yellow card) 44'; Lima 61'; Salino (yellow card) 72' | Stadium: Estádio do Dragão; Attendance: 47,617; Referee: Pedro Proença |

| 21 September 2010 5 | Nacional | 0–2 | Porto | Funchal |
| 19:45 GMT | J. Aurélio (yellow card) 19'; Tomasević (yellow card) 41'; Stojanović (yellow card) 61' | (Report) | J. Aurélio 19' (o.g.); Belluschi (yellow card) 28'; Varela 55'; Moutinho (yellow card) 69' | Stadium: Estádio da Madeira; Attendance: 3,000; Referee: Bruno Paixão |

| 25 September 2010 6 | Porto | 2–0 | Olhanense | Porto |
| 21:15 GMT | Otamendi 23'; Hulk 45+1', (yellow card) 67'; Pereira (yellow card) 64' | | Delson (yellow card) 27'; Vinícius (yellow card) 50'; Djalmir (yellow card) 73'; C. Fernandes (yellow card) 81' | Stadium: Estádio do Dragão; Attendance: 35,430; Referee: Marco Ferreira |

| 4 October 2010 7 | Vitória de Guimarães | 1–1 | Porto | Guimarães |
| 21:15 GMT | Abdelghni 63' | | Hulk 30' | Stadium: Estádio D. Afonso Henriques; Attendance: 20,530; Referee: Carlos Xistra |

| 25 October 2010 8 | Porto | 5–1 | União de Leiria | Porto |
| 20:15 | Hulk 14', 18'; Varela 37'; Falcao 50', 75' | Report | Carlão 71' (pen.) | Stadium: Estádio do Dragão; Attendance: 29,000; Referee: Vasco Santos |

| 30 October 2010 9 | Académica | 0–1 | Porto | Coimbra |
| 21:15 GMT | | | Varela 43' | Stadium: Estádio Cidade de Coimbra; Attendance: 8,000; Referee: Duarte Gomes |

| 7 November 2010 10 | Porto | 5–0 | Benfica | Porto |
| 20:15 GMT | Varela 11'; Falcao 24', 28'; Hulk 79' (pen.), 90' | | | Stadium: Estádio do Dragão; Attendance: 49,700; Referee: Pedro Proença |

| 14 November 2010 11 | Porto | 2–0 | Portimonense | Porto |
| 20:15 GMT | Walter 29'; Hulk 90+1' (pen.) | | | Stadium: Estádio do Dragão; Attendance: 40,070; Referee: João Capela |

| 27 November 2010 12 | Sporting CP | 1–1 | Porto | Lisbon |
| 21:15 GMT | Valdés 38' | | Falcao 57' | Stadium: Estádio José Alvalade; Attendance: 35,000; Referee: Jorge Sousa |

| 6 December 2010 13 | Porto | 1–0 | Vitória de Setúbal | Porto |
| 19:45 GMT | Hulk 44' (pen.) | | | Stadium: Estádio do Dragão; Attendance: 18,000; Referee: Elmano Santos |

| 19 December 2010 14 | Paços de Ferreira | 0–3 | Porto | Paços de Ferreira |
| 20:15 GMT | | | Otamendi 11'; Hulk 90+1' (pen.); Walter 90+4' | Stadium: Estádio da Mata Real; Attendance: 6,000; Referee: Artur Soares Dias |

| 8 January 2011 15 | Porto | 4–1 | Marítimo | Porto |
| 19:15 GMT | Guarín 37', 75'; Hulk 60'; J. Rodríguez 80' | | Diawara 71' | Stadium: Estádio do Dragão; Attendance: 26,000; Referee: Carlos Xistra |

| 16 January 2011 16 | Porto | 3–1 | Naval | Porto |
| 18:00 GMT | Falcao 45'; Hulk 45', 53' | Report | Gomis 89' (pen.) | Stadium: Estádio do Dragão; Attendance: 33,000; Referee: Cosme Machado |

| 22 January 2011 17 | Beira-Mar | 0–1 | Porto | Aveiro |
| 19:15 | | | Hulk 35' (pen.) | Stadium: Estádio Municipal de Aveiro; Attendance: 8,000; Referee: João Ferreira |

| 6 February 2011 18 | Porto | 1–0 | Rio Ave | Porto |
| 18:15 GMT | Varela 7' | | | Stadium: Estádio do Dragão; Attendance: 25,000; Referee: Vasco Santos |

| 13 February 2011 19 | Braga | 0–2 | Porto | Braga |
| 20:15 GMT | | | Otamendi 45', 67' | Stadium: Estádio Municipal de Braga; Attendance: 17,478; Referee: Olegário Benquerença |

| 26 January 2011 20 | Porto | 3–0 | Nacional | Porto |
| 19:45 GMT | Hulk 4', 33'; J. Rodríguez 45' | | | Stadium: Estádio do Dragão; Attendance: 23,212; Referee: Paulo Baptista |

| 26 February 2011 21 | Olhanense | 0–3 | Porto | Olhão |
| 20:15 GMT | | | Belluschi 67'; Falcao 71', 90+2' | Stadium: Estádio José Arcanjo; Attendance: 6,000; Referee: João Capela |

| 5 March 2011 22 | Porto | 2–0 | Vitória de Guimarães | Porto |
| 19:45 GMT | Falcao 67'; C. Rodríguez 90+2' | | | Stadium: Estádio do Dragão; Attendance: 36,000; Referee: Jorge Sousa |

| 14 March 2011 23 | União de Leiria | 0–2 | Porto | Leiria |
| 20:15 GMT | | | Guarín 59'; Hulk 90+2' (pen.) | Stadium: Estádio Dr. Magalhães Pessoa; Attendance: 3,880; Referee: Cosme Machado |

| 20 March 2011 24 | Porto | 3–1 | Académica | Porto |
| 20:15 GMT | Guarín 54'; Maicon 62'; Varela 73' | | Addy 31' | Stadium: Estádio do Dragão; Attendance: 42,000 |

| 3 April 2011 25 | Benfica | 1–2 | Porto | Lisbon |
| 20:30 GMT | Saviola 17' (pen.) | | Roberto 9' (o.g.); Hulk 26' (pen.) | Stadium: Estádio da Luz; Attendance: 48,000; Referee: Duarte Gomes |

| 10 April 2011 26 | Portimonense | 2–3 | Porto | Portimão |
| 18:15 GMT | Rúben 60'; Mourad 84' | | Hulk 50'; Falcao 63'; Maicon 86' | Stadium: Estádio Municipal de Portimão; Attendance: 4,000; Referee: Marco Ferreira |

| 17 April 2011 27 | Porto | 3–2 | Sporting CP | Porto |
| 20:15 GMT | Falcao 26', 50'; Walter 86' | Report | Santos 11'; Fernández 87' | Stadium: Estádio do Dragão; Attendance: 47,109; Referee: Artur Soares Dias |

| 1 May 2011 28 | Vitória de Setúbal | 0–4 | Porto | Setúbal |
| 20:15 GMT | | | Valdomiro 12' (o.g.); Otamendi 45+2'; Walter 57'; Varela 90+3' | Stadium: Estádio do Bonfim; Attendance: 3,500; Referee: Rui Costa |

| 8 May 2011 29 | Porto | 3–3 | Paços de Ferreira | Porto |
| 20:15 GMT | Falcao 8', 53'; Hulk 41' | | Pizzi 47', 58', 85' | Stadium: Estádio do Dragão; Attendance: 48,000; Referee: Cosme Machado |

| 14 May 2011 30 | Marítimo | 0–2 | Porto | Funchal |
| 20:15 GMT | | | Varela 21'; Walter 32' | Stadium: Estádio dos Barreiros; Attendance: 5,000 |

=== UEFA Europa League ===
==== Play-off round ====
| 19 August 2010 First leg | Genk (Belgium) | 0–3 | (Portugal) Porto | Genk, Belgium |
| 20:30 CEST | | | Falcao 29' (pen.); Souza 82'; Belluschi 90' | Stadium: Cristal Arena; Attendance: 16,000; Referee: Luca Banti (Italy) |

| 26 August 2010 Second leg | Porto (Portugal) | 4–2 | (Belgium) Genk | Porto, Portugal |
| 20:30 CEST | Hulk 36', 59' (pen.), 63'; Fernando 53' | | Vossen 22', 56' | Stadium: Estádio do Dragão; Attendance: 33,512; Referee: Georgios Daloukas (Greece) |

==== Group stage ====
Group L
| Team | Pld | W | D | L | GF | GA | GD | Pts |
|---|---|---|---|---|---|---|---|---|
| (Portugal) Porto | 6 | 5 | 1 | 0 | 14 | 4 | +10 | 16 |
| (Turkey) Beşiktaş | 6 | 4 | 1 | 1 | 9 | 6 | +3 | 13 |
| (Austria) Rapid Wien | 6 | 1 | 0 | 5 | 5 | 12 | −7 | 3 |
| (Bulgaria) CSKA Sofia | 6 | 1 | 0 | 5 | 4 | 10 | −6 | 3 |

| 16 September 2010 1 | Porto (Portugal) | 3–0 | (Austria) Rapid Wien | Porto, Portugal |
| 20:05 GMT | Rolando 26'; Falcao 65'; Rúben Micael 77' | Report | | Stadium: Estádio do Dragão; Attendance: 30,014; Referee: Douglas McDonald (Scotland) |

| 30 September 2010 2 | CSKA Sofia (Bulgaria) | 0–1 | (Portugal) Porto | Sofia, Bulgaria |
| 18:00 GMT | | Report | Falcao 16' | Stadium: Vasil Levski National Stadium; Attendance: 18,000; Referee: Alon Yefet (Israel) |

| 21 October 2010 3 | Beşiktaş (Turkey) | 1–3 | (Portugal) Porto | Istanbul, Turkey |
| 18:00 GMT | Bobô 90+2' | Report | Falcao 26'; Hulk 59', 77' | Stadium: BJK İnönü Stadium; Attendance: Carlos Clos Gómez (Spain); Referee: 21,722 |

| 4 November 2010 4 | Porto (Portugal) | 1–1 | (Turkey) Beşiktaş | Porto, Portugal |
| 20:05 GMT | Falcao 36' (pen.) | Report | Kahveci 66' | Stadium: Estádio do Dragão; Attendance: 24,139; Referee: Paolo Tagliavento (Italy) |

| 2 December 2010 5 | Rapid Wien (Austria) | 1–3 | (Portugal) Porto | Vienna, Austria |
| 18:00 GMT | Trimmel 39' | Report | Falcao 42', 85', 88' | Stadium: Gerhard Hanappi Stadium; Attendance: 47,200; Referee: Aleksandar Stavrev (Macedonia) |

| 15 December 2010 6 | Porto (Portugal) | 3–1 | (Bulgaria) CSKA Sofia | Porto, Portugal |
| 20:05 GMT | Otamendi 22'; Rúben Micael 54'; J. Rodríguez 90+3' | Report | Delev 48' | Stadium: Estádio do Dragão; Attendance: 22,930; Referee: Claudio Circhetta (Switzerland) |

==== Knockout phase ====
===== Round of 32 =====
| 17 February 2011 First leg | Sevilla (Spain) | 1–2 | (Portugal) Porto | Seville, Spain |
| 21:05 CET | Kanouté 65' | Report | Rolando 58'; Guarín 86' | Stadium: Estadio Ramón Sánchez Pizjuán; Attendance: 21,555; Referee: Craig Thomson (Scotland) |

| 23 February 2011 Second leg | Porto (Portugal) | 0–1 (2–2a agg.) | (Spain) Sevilla | Porto, Portugal |
| 18:00 CET | | Report | Luís Fabiano 71' | Stadium: Estádio do Dragão; Attendance: 35,609; Referee: Howard Webb (England) |

===== Round of 16 =====
| 10 March 2011 First leg | CSKA Moscow (Russia) | 0–1 | (Portugal) Porto | Moscow, Russia |
| 19:00 CET | | Report | Guarín 70' | Stadium: Luzhniki Stadium; Attendance: 20,000; Referee: Robert Schörgenhofer (Austria) |

| 17 March 2011 Second leg | Porto (Portugal) | 2–1 (3–1 agg.) | (Russia) CSKA Moscow | Porto, Portugal |
| 21:05 CET | Hulk 1'; Guarín 24' | Report | Tošić 29' | Stadium: Estádio do Dragão; Attendance: 32,712; Referee: Kevin Blom (Netherlands) |

===== Quarter-finals =====
| 7 April 2011 First leg | Porto (Portugal) | 5–1 | (Russia) Spartak Moscow | Porto, Portugal |
| 21:05 CEST | Falcao 37', 84', 90+2'; Varela 65'; D. Kombarov 70' (o.g.) | Report | K. Kombarov 71' | Stadium: Estádio do Dragão; Attendance: 38,209; Referee: Serge Gumienny (Belgium) |

| 14 April 2011 Second leg | Spartak Moscow (Russia) | 2–5 (3–10 agg.) | (Portugal) Porto | Moscow, Russia |
| 19:00 CEST | Dzyuba 52'; Ari 72' | Report | Hulk 28'; C. Rodríguez 45+2'; Guarín 47'; Falcao 54'; Rúben Micael 89' | Stadium: Luzhniki Stadium; Attendance: 17,088; Referee: Viktor Kassai (Hungary) |

===== Semi-finals =====
| 28 April 2011 First leg | Porto (Portugal) | 5–1 | (Spain) Villarreal | Porto, Portugal |
| 21:05 CEST | Falcao 49' (pen.), 67', 75', 90'; Guarín 61' | Report | Cani 45' | Stadium: Estádio do Dragão; Attendance: 44,719; Referee: Björn Kuipers (Netherlands) |

| 5 May 2011 Second leg | Villarreal (Spain) | 3–2 (4–7 agg.) | (Portugal) Porto | Villarreal, Spain |
| 21:05 CEST | Cani 17'; Capdevila 75'; Rossi 80' (pen.) | Report | Musacchio 39' (o.g.); Falcao 48' | Stadium: Estadio El Madrigal; Attendance: 18,523; Referee: Gianluca Rocchi (Italy) |

===== Final =====
| 18 May 2011 Final | Porto (Portugal) | 1–0 | (Portugal) Braga | Dublin, Republic of Ireland |
| 20:45 CEST | Falcao 44' | Report | | Stadium: Dublin Arena; Attendance: 45,391; Referee: Carlos Velasco Carballo (Spain) |

=== Taça de Portugal ===
==== Third round ====
| Team 1 | Score | Team 2 |
|---|---|---|
| Porto | 4–1 | Limianos |

==== Fourth round ====
| Team 1 | Score | Team 2 |
|---|---|---|
| Moreirense | 0–1 | Porto |

==== Last 16 ====
| Team 1 | Score | Team 2 |
|---|---|---|
| Porto | 4–0 | Juventude de Évora |

Match Results

| 23 October; 19:00 GMT | Porto | 4–1 | Limianos | Estádio do Dragão, Porto |
| | Walter 8', 60', 90'; Varela 43' | | Pedro Tiba 67' | Attendance: 41,000 |

| 21 November; 18:00 GMT | Moreirense | 0–1 | Porto | Parque de Jogos Comendador Joaquim de Almeida Freitas, Moreira de Cónegos |
| | | | Falcao 75' |

| 11 December; 18:00 GMT | Porto | 4–0 | Juventude de Évora | Estádio do Dragão, Porto |
| | Falcao 11'; Moutinho 41'; Pereira 68'; Walter 84' | | | Attendance: 20,000 |

Last updated: 13 December 2010.
Source: Competitive Matches

== See also ==
- List of unbeaten football club seasons
