= 2010 Sport Club Internacional season =

Internacional
2010 season
- Chairman: Vitório Píffero
- Manager: Celso Roth
- Stadium: Beira-Rio
- Série A: 7th
- FIFA Club World Cup: Third place
- Copa Libertadores: Winners
- Campeonato Gaúcho: Runners-up
- Top goalscorer: League: Alecsandro (10 goals); All: Alecsandro (24 goals)
- Highest home attendance: 53,124 vs. Guadalajara
- Lowest home attendance: 6,031 vs. Santa Cruz
- Average home league attendance: 19,107
Home colours	Away colours

The 2010 season is the 101st season in Sport Club Internacional's existence, and their 40th in the Campeonato Brasileiro, having never been relegated from the top division. On 18 August 2010, Internacional won their second Copa Libertadores title after they defeated Guadalajara 3–2 in the second leg of the final to clinch a 5–3 aggregate win.

== Transfers ==
=== In ===
Date	Pos.	Player	Previous club
12 December 2009	Coach	(Uruguay) Jorge Fossati	(Ecuador) LDU
21 December 2009	RB	(Brazil) Nei	(Brazil) Atlético-PR
23 December 2009	RB	(Uruguay) Bruno Silva	(Netherlands) Ajax
4 January 2010	MF	(Brazil) Thiago Humberto	(Brazil) Barueri
5 January 2010	MF	(Brazil) Wilson Mathías	(Mexico) Monarcas Morelia
29 January 2010	LB	(Brazil) Eltinho	(Brazil) Avaí
29 January 2010	FW	(Brazil) Kléber Pereira	(Brazil) Santos
6 February 2010	DF	(Brazil) Ronaldo	(Brazil) Atlético-PR
18 February 2010	GK	(Argentina) Pato Abbondanzieri	(Argentina) Boca Juniors
9 April 2010	DF	(Brazil) Ronaldo Conceição	(Uruguay) River Plate
13 April 2010	FW	(Brazil) Éverton	(Brazil) Caxias
19 April 2010	MF	(Brazil) Derley	(Brazil) Náutico
10 May 2010	MF	(Brazil) Tinga	(Germany) Borussia Dortmund
15 June 2009	Coach	(Brazil) Celso Roth	(Brazil) Vasco da Gama
17 June 2010	MF	(Brazil) Oscar	(Brazil) São Paulo
18 June 2010	GK	(Brazil) Renan	(Spain) Valencia
25 June 2010	LB	(Brazil) Leonardo	(Greece) Olympiacos
1 July 2010	FW	(Brazil) Rafael Sóbis	(United Arab Emirates) Al-Jazira
16 July 2010	DF	(Brazil) Dalton	(Brazil) Fluminense
24 August 2010	FW	(Brazil) Ilan	(England) West Ham United

=== Out ===
Date	Pos.	Player	New club
1 March 2010	DF	(Brazil) Danilo Silva	(Ukraine) Dynamo Kyiv
28 May 2010	Coach	(Uruguay) Jorge Fossati	(Saudi Arabia) Al-Shabab
20 June 2010	LB	(Brazil) Eltinho	(Brazil) Avaí
30 June 2010	MF	(Brazil) Tales	(Portugal) Braga
29 July 2010	FW	(Brazil) Walter	(Portugal) Porto
5 August 2010	FW	(Brazil) Kléber Pereira	(Brazil) Vitória
19 August 2010	MF	(Brazil) Sandro	(England) Tottenham Hotspur
23 August 2010	DF	(Brazil) Fabiano Eller	(Qatar) Al-Wakrah
25 August 2010	FW	(Brazil) Taison	(Ukraine) Metalist Kharkiv

=== Completed loan departures ===
Date	Pos.	Player	Club
21 December 2009	MF	(Ecuador) Luis Bolaños	(Ecuador) Barcelona
5 January 2010	DF	(Brazil) Titi	(Brazil) Vasco da Gama
4 February 2010	MF	(Brazil) Maycon	(Brazil) Guarani
4 February 2010	MF	(Brazil) Paulinho	(Brazil) Guarani
12 February 2010	DF	(Brazil) Danny Morais	(Brazil) Botafogo
19 April 2010	GK	(Brazil) Agenor	(Brazil) Criciúma
5 May 2010	MF	(Brazil) Josimar	(Brazil) Ponte Preta
20 June 2010	RB	(Brazil) Arílton	(Brazil) Bahia
15 July 2010	MF	(Brazil) Thiago Humberto	(Brazil) Vitória

== 2010 Campeonato Gaúcho ==
=== Taça Fernando Carvalho ===
==== Group B standings ====
Pos	Team	Pld	W	D	L	GF	GA	GD	Pts	Qualification
1	Internacional (Q)	8	7	1	0	19	6	+13	22	To the Second Stage
2	São José-RS (Q)	8	6	1	1	18	10	+8	19	To the Second Stage
3	São Luiz (Q)	8	5	3	0	20	7	+13	18	To the Second Stage
4	Veranópolis (Q)	8	5	2	1	20	11	+9	17	To the Second Stage
5	Pelotas	8	5	0	3	18	10	+8	15	

Updated to match(es) played on 14 February 2010. Source: FGF (in Portuguese)
Rules for classification: 1) points; 2) goal difference; 3) number of goals scored.
(Q) Qualified for the phase indicated

17 January 2010
19:30 (UTC−3)

Internacional	4–2	Ypiranga
Leandro Damião 9', 51'; Ytalo 38'; Walter 41'	Report (pt)	Sharlei 39'; Tomás 73'

Estádio José Pinheiro Borda (Beira-Rio), Porto Alegre
Attendance: 7,815
Referee: Carlos Simon (Brazil)

20 January 2010
22:00 (UTC−3)

Porto Alegre	0–1	Internacional
	Report (pt)	Leandro Damião 26'

Complexo Esportivo da Ulbra, Canoas
Attendance: 924
Referee: Anderson Daronco (Brazil)

24 January 2010
17:00 (UTC−3)

Internacional-SM	1–1	Internacional
Juliano 45'	Report (pt)	Daniel 48'

Estádio Presidente Vargas, Santa Maria
Attendance: 1,377
Referee: Jean Pierre Lima (Brazil)

27 January 2010
19:30 (UTC−3)

Internacional	5–0	Juventude
Kléber 11'; Bolívar 22'; Alecsandro 71'; Taison 81'; Giuliano 84'	Report (pt)

Estádio José Pinheiro Borda (Beira-Rio), Porto Alegre
Attendance: 18,455
Referee: Márcio Coruja (Brazil)

31 January 2010
19:30 (UTC−3)

Internacional	1–0	Grêmio
Alecsandro 79'	Report (pt)

Estádio Olímpico Colosso da Lagoa, Erechim
Attendance: 16,388
Referee: Leandro Vuaden (Brazil)

3 February 2010
22:00 (UTC−3)

Novo Hamburgo	1–3	Internacional
Paulo César 60'	Report (pt)	Leandro Damião 22'; Gonzalo Sorondo 45'; Thiago Humberto 86'

Estádio Santa Rosa, Novo Hamburgo
Attendance: 1,887
Referee: Francisco Silva Neto (Brazil)

7 February 2010
19:30 (UTC−3)

Internacional	2–1	Ypiranga
Taison 30'; Edu 45'	Report (pt)	Emanuel 73'

Estádio José Pinheiro Borda (Beira-Rio), Porto Alegre
Attendance: 9,134
Referee: Jean Pierre Lima (Brazil)

13 February 2010
16:00 (UTC−3)

Esportivo	1–2	Internacional
Marco Aurélio 21'	Report (pt)	Kléber 6'; Alecsandro 59'

Estádio Montanha dos Vinhedos, Bento Gonçalves
Attendance: 1,243
Referee: Ronaldo da Silva (Brazil)

==== Quarterfinals ====
18 February 2010
21:50 (UTC−3)

Internacional	2–0	Juventude
Alecsandro 4'; Gonzalo Sorondo 66'	Report (pt)

Estádio José Pinheiro Borda (Beira-Rio), Porto Alegre
Attendance: 11,149
Referee: Anderson Daronco (Brazil)

==== Semifinals ====
21 February 2010
17:00 (UTC−3)

Internacional	1–2	Novo Hamburgo
Bruno Silva 51'	Report (pt)	Paulinho 68'; Chicão 90+1'

Estádio José Pinheiro Borda (Beira-Rio), Porto Alegre
Attendance: 9,296
Referee: Jean Pierre Lima (Brazil)

=== Taça Fábio Koff ===
==== Group B standings ====
Pos	Team	Pld	W	D	L	GF	GA	GD	Pts	Qualification
1	Caxias (Q)	7	6	1	0	13	5	+8	19	To the Second Stage
2	São José-RS (Q)	7	3	3	1	16	10	+6	12	To the Second Stage
3	Internacional (Q)	7	3	2	2	12	9	+3	11	To the Second Stage
4	Pelotas (Q)	7	2	3	2	10	10	0	9	To the Second Stage
5	Veranópolis	7	2	2	3	14	13	+1	8	

Updated to match(es) played on 4 April 2010. Source: FGF (in Portuguese)
Rules for classification: 1) points; 2) goal difference; 3) number of goals scored.
(Q) Qualified for the phase indicated

3 March 2010
17:00 (UTC−3)

Internacional	4–1	Santa Cruz
Kléber 15'; Alecsandro 43', 82'; Giuliano 55'	Report (pt)	Bolívar (o.g.) 39'

Estádio José Pinheiro Borda (Beira-Rio), Porto Alegre
Attendance: 6,031
Referee: Francisco Silva Neto (Brazil)

7 March 2010
17:00 (UTC−3)

São Luiz	0–1	Internacional
	Report (pt)	Elton 81'

Estádio 19 de Outubro, Ijuí
Attendance: 1,529
Referee: Leonardo Gaciba (Brazil)

14 March 2010
17:00 (UTC−3)

Veranópolis	1–1	Internacional
Romano 37'	Report (pt)	Andrés D'Alessandro 78'

Estádio Antônio David Farina, Veranópolis
Attendance: 1,177
Referee: Márcio Chagas da Silva (Brazil)

21 March 2010
19:30 (UTC−3)

Internacional	2–2	Pelotas
Fabiano Eller 30'; Andrés D'Alessandro 78'	Report (pt)	Alex Dias 27'; Gavião 88'

Estádio José Pinheiro Borda (Beira-Rio), Porto Alegre
Attendance: 11,838
Referee: Fabrício Neves Corrêa (Brazil)

24 March 2010
21:50 (UTC−3)

São José	3–0	Internacional
Dadá 23'; Jefferson 44'; Guilherme 48'	Report (pt)

Estádio Passo D'Areia, Porto Alegre
Attendance: 822
Referee: Márcio Chagas da Silva (Brazil)

28 March 2010
16:00 (UTC−3)

Caxias	2–0	Internacional
Marcelo Costa 28'; Edu Silva 49'	Report (pt)

Estádio Centenário, Caxias do Sul
Attendance: 2,939
Referee: Carlos Simon (Brazil)

4 April 2010
16:00 (UTC−3)

Internacional	4–0	Universidade
Alecsandro 66', 80'; Taison 88', 90+1'	Report (pt)

Estádio José Pinheiro Borda (Beira-Rio), Porto Alegre
Attendance: 8,012
Referee: Leonardo Gaciba (Brazil)

==== Quarterfinals ====
7 April 2010
21:50 (UTC−3)

Novo Hamburgo	3–3	Internacional
Micael 3'; Maiquel 51'; Michel 80'	Report (pt)	Alecsandro 7', 77'; Walter 22'
Penalties
Paulinho (penalty scored); Cláudio Luiz (penalty scored); Michel (penalty scored); Micael (penalty scored); Kempes (penalty missed)	4–5	(penalty scored) Alecsandro; (penalty scored) Andrés D'Alessandro; (penalty scored) Glaydson; (penalty scored) Wilson Mathías; (penalty scored) Taison

Estádio Santa Rosa, Novo Hamburgo
Attendance: 1,572
Referee: Vinícius Costa (Brazil)

==== Semifinals ====
10 April 2010
18:30 (UTC−3)

Internacional	2–0	Ypiranga
Walter 30', 36'	Report (pt)

Estádio José Pinheiro Borda (Beira-Rio), Porto Alegre
Attendance: 22,822
Referee: Leandro Vuaden (Brazil)

==== Finals ====
18 April 2010
16:00 (UTC−3)

Internacional	3–2	Pelotas
Bolívar 42'; Edu 74'; D'Alessandro 82'	Report (pt)	Clodoaldo 30', 38'

Estádio José Pinheiro Borda (Beira-Rio), Porto Alegre
Attendance: 30,589
Referee: Carlos Simon (Brazil)

=== Tournament Finals ===
25 April 2010
16:00 (UTC−3)

Internacional	0–2	Grêmio
	Report (pt)	Rodrigo 67'; Borges 87'

Estádio José Pinheiro Borda (Beira-Rio), Porto Alegre
Attendance: 34,744
Referee: Leonardo Gaciba (Brazil)

2 May 2010
16:00 (UTC−3)

Grêmio	0–1	Internacional
	Report (pt)	Giuliano 9'

Estádio Olímpico Monumental, Porto Alegre
Attendance: 44,727
Referee: Leandro Vuaden (Brazil)

== 2010 Copa Libertadores ==
=== Second stage ===
==== Table ====
Pos	Team	Pld	W	D	L	GF	GA	GD	Pts
1	(Brazil) Internacional	6	3	3	0	8	2	+6	12
2	(Ecuador) Deportivo Quito	6	3	1	2	5	7	−2	10
3	(Uruguay) Cerro	6	2	2	2	5	5	0	8
4	(Ecuador) Emelec	6	0	2	4	2	6	−4	2

23 February 2010
21:50 (UTC−3)

Internacional (Brazil)	2–1	(Ecuador) Emelec
Nei 53'; Alecsandro 87'	Report	Quiroz 49'

Estádio José Pinheiro Borda (Beira-Rio), Porto Alegre
Attendance: 39,304
Referee: Diego Abal (Argentina)

11 March 2010
21:30 (UTC−5)

Deportivo Quito (Ecuador)	1–1	(Brazil) Internacional
Minda 33'	Report	Giuliano 40'

Estadio Olímpico Atahualpa, Quito
Attendance: 4,000
Referee: José Buitrago (Colombia)

18 March 2010
19:15 (UTC−3)

Cerro (Uruguay)	0–0	(Brazil) Internacional
	Report

Estadio Atilio Paiva Olivera, Rivera
Attendance: 25,000
Referee: Saúl Laverni (Argentina)

31 March 2010
21:50 (UTC−3)

Internacional (Brazil)	2–0	(Uruguay) Cerro
Ibáñez 59' (o.g.); Alecsandro 72'	Report

Estádio José Pinheiro Borda (Beira-Rio), Porto Alegre
Attendance: 36,897
Referee: Carlos Torres (Paraguay)

14 April 2010
17:30 (UTC−5)

Emelec (Ecuador)	0–0	(Brazil) Internacional
	Report

Estadio George Capwell, Guayaquil
Referee: Marlon Escalante (Venezuela)

22 April 2010
19:30 (UTC−3)

Internacional (Brazil)	3–0	(Ecuador) Deportivo Quito
Andrezinho 4'; Bolívar 61'; Giuliano 90+2'	Report

Estádio José Pinheiro Borda (Beira-Rio), Porto Alegre
Attendance: 31,360
Referee: Carlos Amarilla (Paraguay)

=== Round of 16 ===
28 April 2010
21:50 (UTC−3)

Banfield (Argentina)	3–1	(Brazil) Internacional
Rodríguez 47'; Battión 59'; Fernández 81'	Report	Kléber 50'

Estadio Florencio Sola, Banfield
Attendance: 25,000
Referee: Jorge Larrionda (Uruguay)

6 May 2010
19:30 (UTC−3)

Internacional (Brazil)	2–0	(Argentina) Banfield
Alecsandro 42'; Walter 58'	Report

Estádio José Pinheiro Borda (Beira-Rio), Porto Alegre
Attendance: 34,643
Referee: William Roldán (Colombia)

Internacional 3–3 Banfield on points. Internacional advanced on away goals.

=== Quarterfinals ===
13 May 2010
21:15 (UTC−3)

Internacional (Brazil)	1–0	(Argentina) Estudiantes
Sorondo 88'	Report

Estádio José Pinheiro Borda (Beira-Rio), Porto Alegre
Attendance: 40,115
Referee: Roberto Silvera (Uruguay)

20 May 2010
19:45 (UTC−3)

Estudiantes (Argentina)	2–1	(Brazil) Internacional
González 19'; Pérez 21'	Report	Giuliano 88'

Estadio Centenario, Quilmes
Attendance: 30,000
Referee: Óscar Ruiz (Colombia)

Estudiantes 3–3 Internacional on points. Internacional advanced on away goals.

=== Semifinals ===
28 July 2010
21:50 (UTC−3)

Internacional (Brazil)	1–0	(Brazil) São Paulo
Giuliano 68'	Report

Estádio José Pinheiro Borda (Beira-Rio), Porto Alegre
Attendance: 48,166
Referee: Héctor Baldassi (Argentina)

5 August 2010
21:50 (UTC−3)

São Paulo (Brazil)	2–1	(Brazil) Internacional
Alex Silva 30'; Ricardo Oliveira 54'	Report	Alecsandro 52'

Estádio Cícero Pompeu de Toledo (Morumbi), São Paulo
Attendance: 62,129
Referee: Carlos Amarilla (Paraguay)

São Paulo 3–3 Internacional on points. Internacional advanced on away goals.

=== Finals ===
11 August 2010
19:50 (UTC−5)

Guadalajara (Mexico)	1–2	(Brazil) Internacional
Bautista 45+2'	Report	Giuliano 72'; Bolívar 76'

Estadio Omnilife, Zapopan
Attendance: 30,870
Referee: Héctor Baldassi (Argentina)

18 August 2010
22:00 (UTC−3)

Internacional (Brazil)	3–2	(Mexico) Guadalajara
Rafael Sóbis 61'; Leandro Damião 76'; Giuliano 89'	Report	Fabián 43'; Bravo 90+2'

Estádio José Pinheiro Borda (Beira-Rio), Porto Alegre
Attendance: 53,124
Referee: Óscar Ruiz (Colombia)

Internacional won the Copa Libertadores on points 6–0.

== 2010 Campeonato Brasileiro ==
=== Table ===
Pos	Team	Pld	W	D	L	GF	GA	GD	Pts	Qualification or relegation
5	Atlético Paranaense	38	17	9	12	43	45	−2	60	2011 Copa Sudamericana Second Stage
6	Botafogo	38	14	17	7	54	42	+12	59	2011 Copa Sudamericana Second Stage
7	Internacional	38	16	10	12	48	41	+7	58	2011 Copa Libertadores Second Stage (Note: Internacional qualified as the 2010 Copa Libertadores champion.)
8	Santos	38	15	11	12	63	50	+13	56	2011 Copa Libertadores Second Stage (Note: Santos qualified as the 2010 Copa do Brasil champion.)
9	São Paulo	38	15	10	13	54	54	0	55	2011 Copa Sudamericana Second Stage

Rules for classification: 1st points; 2nd wins; 3rd goal difference; 4th goals scored; 5th head-to-head results; 6th least red cards received; 7th least yellow cards received; 8th draw
Notes:

9 May 2010
16:00 (UTC−3)

Internacional	1–2	Cruzeiro
Taison 7'		Kléber 4' (pen.), 36'

Estádio José Pinheiro Borda (Beira-Rio), Porto Alegre
Attendance: 14,177
Referee: Wilson Luiz Seneme (Brazil)

16 May 2010
16:00 (UTC−3)

Goiás	2–3	Internacional
Éverton Santos 30'; Amaral 41'		Walter 58', 74'; Giuliano 82'

Estádio do Governo do Estado de Goiás (Serra Dourada), Goiânia
Attendance: 3,731
Referee: Wallace Nascimento Valente (Brazil)

23 May 2010
16:00 (UTC−3)

Internacional	0–2	São Paulo
		Hernanes 37'; Fernandão 62'

Estádio José Pinheiro Borda (Beira-Rio), Porto Alegre
Attendance: 28,824
Referee: Marcelo de Lima Henrique (Brazil)

27 May 2010
21:00 (UTC−3)

Vasco da Gama	3–2	Internacional
Élton 49'; Philippe Coutinho 77' (pen.); Nílton 83'		Andrezinho 38', 40'

Estádio Vasco da Gama (São Januário), Rio de Janeiro
Attendance: 2,786
Referee: Héber Roberto Lopes (Brazil)

30 May 2010
16:00 (UTC−3)

Internacional	4–1	Atlético Paranaense
Alecsandro 48', 77'; Sorondo 52'; Andrezinho 57'		Manoel 84'

Estádio José Pinheiro Borda (Beira-Rio), Porto Alegre
Attendance: 9,289
Referee: Célio Amorim (Brazil)

3 June 2010
21:00 (UTC−3)

Corinthians	2–0	Internacional
Roberto Carlos 38' (pen.); Iarley 52'

Estádio Municipal Paulo Machado de Carvalho (Pacaembu), São Paulo
Attendance: 36,259
Referee: Sandro Meira Ricci (Brazil)

6 June 2010
18:30 (UTC−3)

Internacional	1–1	Palmeiras
Giuliano 66'		Lincoln 14'

Estádio José Pinheiro Borda (Beira-Rio), Porto Alegre
Attendance: 13,769
Referee: Djalma Beltrami (Brazil)

14 July 2010
21:50 (UTC−3)

Guarani	0–3	Internacional
		Sandro 59'; Alecsandro 71'; Taison 90+2'

Estádio Brinco de Ouro da Princesa, Campinas
Attendance: 2,193
Referee: Evandro Rogério Roman (Brazil)

18 July 2010
19:30 (UTC−3)

Internacional	2–1	Ceará
Alecsandro 16' (pen.); Kléber 46'		Michel 80'

Estádio José Pinheiro Borda (Beira-Rio), Porto Alegre
Attendance: 5,955
Referee: Alício Pena Júnior (Brazil)

21 July 2010
19:30 (UTC−3)

Atlético Mineiro	1–2	Internacional
Diego Souza 7'		Alecsandro 13', 61'

Estádio José Pinheiro Borda (Beira-Rio), Porto Alegre
Attendance: 4,713
Referee: Luiz Flávio de Oliveira (Brazil)

25 July 2010
19:30 (UTC−3)

Internacional	1–0	Flamengo
Taison 4'

Estádio José Pinheiro Borda (Beira-Rio), Porto Alegre
Attendance: 25,002
Referee: Wilson Luiz Seneme (Brazil)

1 August 2010
19:30 (UTC−3)

Internacional	0–0	Grêmio

Estádio José Pinheiro Borda (Beira-Rio), Porto Alegre
Attendance: 36,240
Referee: Sálvio Spinola Fagundes Filho (Brazil)

15 August 2010
19:30 (UTC−3)

Fluminense	3–0	Internacional
Mariano 19'; Washington 22'; Emerson 59'

Estádio José Pinheiro Borda (Beira-Rio), Porto Alegre
Attendance: 57,454
Referee: Wilson Luiz Seneme (Brazil)

22 August 2010
19:30 (UTC−3)

Internacional	1–1	Atlético Goianiense
Leandro Damião 67'		Victor Ferraz 42'

Estádio José Pinheiro Borda (Beira-Rio), Porto Alegre
Attendance: 13,017
Referee: Paulo César de Oliveira (Brazil)

25 August 2010
19:30 (UTC−3)

Avaí	0–1	Internacional
		9' Índio

Estádio José Pinheiro Borda (Beira-Rio), Porto Alegre
Attendance: 9,713
Referee: Ricardo Marques Ribeiro (Brazil)

28 August 2010
18:30 (UTC−3)

Internacional	1–0	Botafogo
Leandro Damião 23'

Estádio José Pinheiro Borda (Beira-Rio), Porto Alegre
Attendance: 14,693
Referee: Sandro Meira Ricci (Brazil)

1 September 2010
19:30 (UTC−3)

Vitória	0–0	Internacional

Estádio José Pinheiro Borda (Beira-Rio), Porto Alegre
Attendance: 8,040
Referee: Cleber Wellington Abade (Brazil)

5 September 2010
19:30 (UTC−3)

Internacional	2–0	Grêmio Prudente
Rafael Sóbis 51'; Leandro Damião 74'

Estádio José Pinheiro Borda (Beira-Rio), Porto Alegre
Referee: Cláudio Mercante (Brazil)

8 September 2010
19:30 (UTC−3)

Cruzeiro	1–0	Internacional
Everton 14'

Estádio Municipal João Havelange (Parque do Sabiá), Uberlândia
Attendance: 13,677
Referee: Nielson Nogueira Dias (Brazil)

12 September 2010
18:30 (UTC−3)

Internacional	0–0	Goiás

Estádio José Pinheiro Borda (Beira-Rio), Porto Alegre
Attendance: 7,134
Referee: Paulo Cesar de Oliveira (Brazil)

16 September 2010
21:00 (UTC−3)

São Paulo	1–3	Internacional
Cléber Santana 19'		Wilson Mathías 10'; Leandro Damião 29'; Giuliano 61'

Estádio Cícero Pompeu de Toledo (Morumbi), São Paulo
Attendance: 11,327
Referee: Felipe Gomes da Silva (Brazil)

19 September 2010
16:00 (UTC−3)

Internacional	1–0	Vasco da Gama
Edu 46'

Estádio José Pinheiro Borda (Beira-Rio), Porto Alegre
Attendance: 27,061
Referee: Francisco Carlos Nascimento (Brazil)

22 September 2010
22:00 (UTC−3)

Atlético Paranaense	1–0	Internacional
Paulo Baier 43'

Estádio Joaquim Américo Guimarães (Arena da Baixada), Curitiba
Attendance: 18,597
Referee: André Luiz de Freitas Castro (Brazil)

26 September 2010
16:00 (UTC−3)

Internacional	3–2	Corinthians
Tinga 29'; Alecsandro 77'; Andrezinho 90+3'		Jorge Henrique 65'; Bruno César 90' (pen.)

Estádio José Pinheiro Borda (Beira-Rio), Porto Alegre
Attendance: 33,787
Referee: Sandro Meira Ricci (Brazil)

29 September 2010
19:30 (UTC−3)

Palmeiras	2–0	Internacional
Marcos Assunção 31', 58'

Arena Barueri, Barueri
Attendance: 12,264
Referee: Evandro Rogério Roman (Brazil)

2 October 2010
18:30 (UTC−3)

Internacional	3–0	Guarani
Daniel 52'; Glaydson 63'; Giuliano 80'

Estádio José Pinheiro Borda (Beira-Rio), Porto Alegre
Attendance: 9,159
Referee: Edivaldo Elias da Silva (Brazil)

6 October 2010
21:50 (UTC−3)

Ceará	1–0	Internacional
Heleno 50'

Estádio Plácido Aderaldo Castelo Castelão), Fortaleza
Attendance: 15,897
Referee: Wilton Sampaio (Brazil)

10 October 2010
18:30 (UTC−3)

Internacional	1–0	Atlético Mineiro
Alecsandro 45+1'

Estádio José Pinheiro Borda (Beira-Rio), Porto Alegre
Attendance: 13,328
Referee: Sálvio Spínola (Brazil)

13 October 2010
22:00 (UTC−3)

Santos	1–0	Internacional
Neymar 26'

Estádio Urbano Caldeira (Vila Belmiro), Santos
Attendance: 10,036
Referee: Nielson Nogueira Dias (Brazil)

16 October 2010
18:30 (UTC−3)

Flamengo	3–0	Internacional
Deivid 14' (pen.), 47'; Renato 38'

Estádio Olímpico João Havelange (Engenhão), Rio de Janeiro
Attendance: 13,423
Referee: Wilson Luiz Seneme (Brazil)

24 October 2010
18:30 (UTC−3)

Grêmio	2–2	Internacional
André Lima 36'; Fábio Santos 70'		Alecsandro 65' (pen.); D'Alessandro 83'

Estádio Olímpico Monumental, Porto Alegre
Attendance: 41,661
Referee: Carlos Eugênio Simon (Brazil)

30 October 2010
16:00 (UTC−3)

Internacional	1–1	Santos
Leandro Damião 82'		Zé Eduardo 78'

Estádio José Pinheiro Borda (Beira-Rio), Porto Alegre
Attendance: 29,565
Referee: Paulo Henrique Godoy Bezerra (Brazil)

3 November 2010
19:30 (UTC−3)

Internacional	0–0	Fluminense

Estádio José Pinheiro Borda (Beira-Rio), Porto Alegre
Attendance: 17,968
Referee: Evandro Rogério Roman (Brazil)

6 November 2010
19:30 (UTC−3)

Atlético Goianiense	2–2	Internacional
Juninho 11'; Elias 22' (pen.)		Leandro Damião 54'; Giuliano 71' (pen.)

Estádio do Governo do Estado de Goiás (Serra Dourada), Goiânia
Attendance: 4,459
Referee: Sandro Meira Ricci (Brazil)

14 November 2010
17:00 (UTC−3)

Internacional	2–3	Avaí
Leandro Damião 54'; Rafael Sóbis 59'		Patric 1'; Batista 38'; Robinho 63'

Estádio José Pinheiro Borda (Beira-Rio), Porto Alegre
Attendance: 10,374
Referee: Péricles Bassols (Brazil)

21 November 2010
17:00 (UTC−3)

Botafogo	1–2	Internacional
Antônio Carlos 75'		Andrezinho 66'; Rafael Sóbis 74'

Estádio Olímpico João Havelange (Engenhão), Rio de Janeiro
Attendance: 19,604
Referee: Ricardo Marques Ribeiro (Brazil)

28 November 2010
17:00 (UTC−3)

Internacional	1–1	Vitória
Rafael Sóbis 61'		Adaílton 50'

Estádio José Pinheiro Borda (Beira-Rio), Porto Alegre
Attendance: 11,415
Referee: Sálvio Spínola (Brazil)

2 December 2010
21:00 (UTC−3)

Grêmio Prudente	0–3	Internacional
		Alecsandro 16'; Tinga 23'; Giuliano 81'

Estádio Eduardo José Farah (Prudentão), Presidente Prudente
Attendance: 1,246
Referee: Marcos Mateus Pereira (Brazil)

== 2010 FIFA Club World Cup ==
=== Semifinals ===
14 December 2010
20:00

TP Mazembe (Democratic Republic of the Congo)	2–0	(Brazil) Internacional
		0

Mohammed Bin Zayed Stadium, Abu Dhabi
Referee: Björn Kuipers (Netherlands)
