= Oscar (footballer, born 1991) =

Brazilian association football player

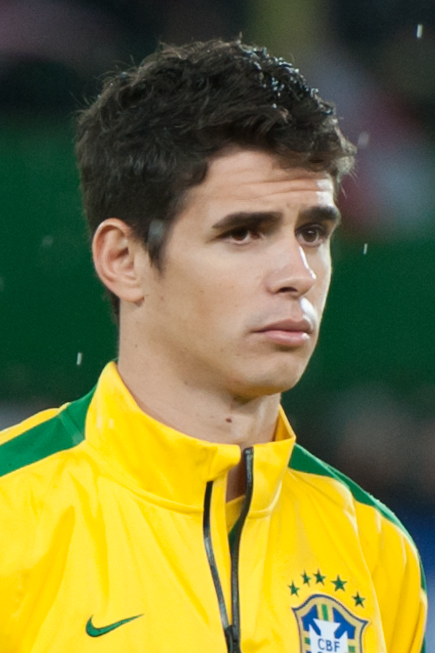
- Oscar with Brazil in 2014

Personal information
- Full name: Oscar dos Santos Emboaba Júnior
- Date of birth: 9 September 1991 (age 35)
- Place of birth: Americana, Brazil
- Height: 1.79 m (5 ft 10 in)
- Position: Attacking midfielder

Youth career
- 1998–2004: União Barbarense
- 2004–2008: São Paulo

Senior career*
Years	Team	Apps	(Gls)
2008–2010	São Paulo	12	(0)
2010–2012	Internacional	56	(15)
2012–2017	Chelsea	131	(21)
2017–2024	Shanghai Port	179	(58)
2025	São Paulo	18	(2)
Total		396	(96)

International career
2011	Brazil U20	15	(3)
2012	Brazil U23	6	(1)
2011–2015	Brazil	48	(12)
Medal record
Men's football
Representing Brazil
FIFA Confederations Cup
Winner	2013 Brazil
Olympic Games
Silver medal – second place	2012 London	Team
FIFA U-20 World Cup
Winner	2011 Colombia
South American Youth Football Championship
Winner	2011 Peru
- * Club domestic league appearances and goals

Oscar dos Santos Emboaba Júnior (Brazilian Portuguese: [oˈskaʁ dus ˈsɐ̃tuz ẽˈbwabɐ ˈʒuni.oʁ]; born 9 September 1991), known mononymously as Oscar, is a Brazilian former professional footballer who played as an attacking midfielder.

Oscar began his career at São Paulo, and in 2009, he went to court against the club due to irregularities in his contract. After a series of controversies, he left for Internacional, where he spent the next three years of his career. His displays for club and country led to him signing for Chelsea for a fee of R$61.575 million. After four and a half years with Chelsea, he signed for Chinese Super League club Shanghai SIPG (now known as Shanghai Port) for an Asian transfer record of £60 million in January 2017. He spent seven years in China before returning to his home country as he signed for his boyhood club, São Paulo, where he ended his professional career.

Oscar was a Brazilian international and represented his country at the under-20 level, at the 2012 London Olympics and at senior level. On 20 August 2011, Oscar scored three goals in the 2011 FIFA U-20 World Cup final win against Portugal, becoming the first player to score a hat-trick in the FIFA U-20 World Cup final. Oscar later described his performances at the tournament as being a "gateway to the senior side". His playing style and ability drew comparison to compatriot Kaká. Oscar made his senior debut for Brazil in 2011, and was a member of the squads that won the 2013 FIFA Confederations Cup and finished fourth at the 2014 FIFA World Cup, both on home soil.

== Club career ==
=== Early career ===
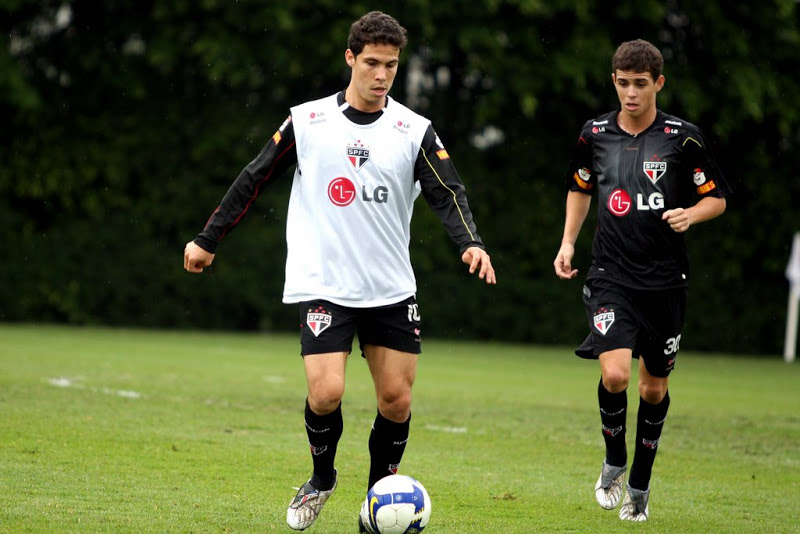
Hernanes and Oscar training for São Paulo in 2009

Born in Americana, São Paulo, Oscar came through the youth academy at União Barbarense and impressed from an early age.

He made his professional debut with São Paulo on 28 August 2008, in the second leg of the first stage of the Copa Sudamericana. He played the full 90 minutes of the goalless draw with Atlético Paranaense at the Arena da Baixada, but he and Juninho had their attempts saved by Vinícius in the penalty shootout, eliminating their team. His domestic debut came on 13 March 2009, filling in for Jean for the final eight minutes of a 5–0 home win over Mirassol in the Campeonato Paulista. That year, he also made 11 substitute appearances for the team in the Campeonato Brasileiro Série A.

=== Internacional ===
Initially, Oscar joined Internacional after a contractual dispute with his former club São Paulo, with Oscar's agent claiming that the club had not paid salaries as promised. Oscar's representatives argued that his contract with São Paulo was null and void whereupon Oscar joined Internacional as a free agent. São Paulo continued to claim that Oscar belonged to them and lodged legal appeals which prevented Oscar from playing for Internacional in vital Copa Libertadores fixtures. Eventually, a settlement was agreed upon between São Paulo and Internacional on 30 May 2012, severing his contract for a fee of €6 million.

Oscar's first season at Internacional was blighted by injury. On 23 February 2011, as an 80th-minute substitute for Leandro Damião, he scored his first goal for the club to conclude a 4–0 home win over Jaguares de Chiapas at the start of Inter's defence of the Copa Libertadores. He added two more goals in the competition before their elimination in the last 16 by Peñarol. His first goals in domestic football came on 5 June, a brace in a 4–2 win over América-MG in the third game of the Série A season; he finished the season with 10 goals from 26 games.

=== Chelsea ===
On 16 July 2012, Chelsea agreed on a fee of R$61.575 million for Oscar. (according to several media, the fee was estimated for £19 million or £25 million) On 25 July, Chelsea announced the signing of Oscar on a five-year contract. On 19 August 2012, Oscar made his debut for Chelsea by coming on in the 64th minute for fellow debutant, Eden Hazard in their opening game of the 2012–13 season against Wigan Athletic.

Oscar made his first start of the season on 19 September in Chelsea's first Champions League match against Juventus. After making the match 1–0 in favour of Chelsea with a deflected effort, he added a second, which curled over Juventus keeper Gianluigi Buffon, to make it 2–0 at Stamford Bridge. However the game ended in a 2–2 draw, but he was awarded Man of the Match. He commented on his second goal, saying, "I am very happy with two goals on my debut but I would have been much happier if the team had won the game. In Brazil, young boys dream of playing in the Champions League and I'm very proud to have realised my dream."

Three days later, Oscar then made his first Premier League start in a 1–0 victory over Stoke City. Following his good performances, Oscar became a regular starter in Roberto Di Matteo's creative midfield triumvirate with Juan Mata and Eden Hazard. He scored his third goal of the season, in the Champions League, in Chelsea's 2–1 away defeat away to Shakhtar Donetsk in Donetsk, and continued his scoring record in Europe by scoring into an open net from 40 yards out in the reverse fixture against Shakhtar at Stamford Bridge, a match which Chelsea won 3–2. Oscar also scored in Europe in ultimately Chelsea's last Champions League fixture, making the score 6–1 for Chelsea against debutants Nordsjælland.

After the sacking of manager Di Matteo on 21 November, interim manager Rafael Benítez only started Oscar three times in his first seven games. Benítez praised Oscar's attitude after dropping him for the FIFA Club World Cup Final against Corinthians and believed there was no rift between himself and the player. He scored his first Premier League goal for the club on 23 December, scoring a penalty during an 8–0 win against Aston Villa.

On 14 February 2013, less than a minute after coming off the bench to replace Mata, Oscar exchanged passes with Hazard before finishing past Tomáš Vaclík, breaking the deadlock and handing Chelsea a 1–0 away victory over Sparta Praha in the first leg of their Europa League Round of 32 clash. On 15 May, Oscar played the full ninety minutes as Chelsea defeated Benfica 2–1 in the Europa League final in Amsterdam, securing his first piece of silverware with the London club. The following day, his goal against Juventus in the Champions League was named the Chelsea "Goal of the Season".

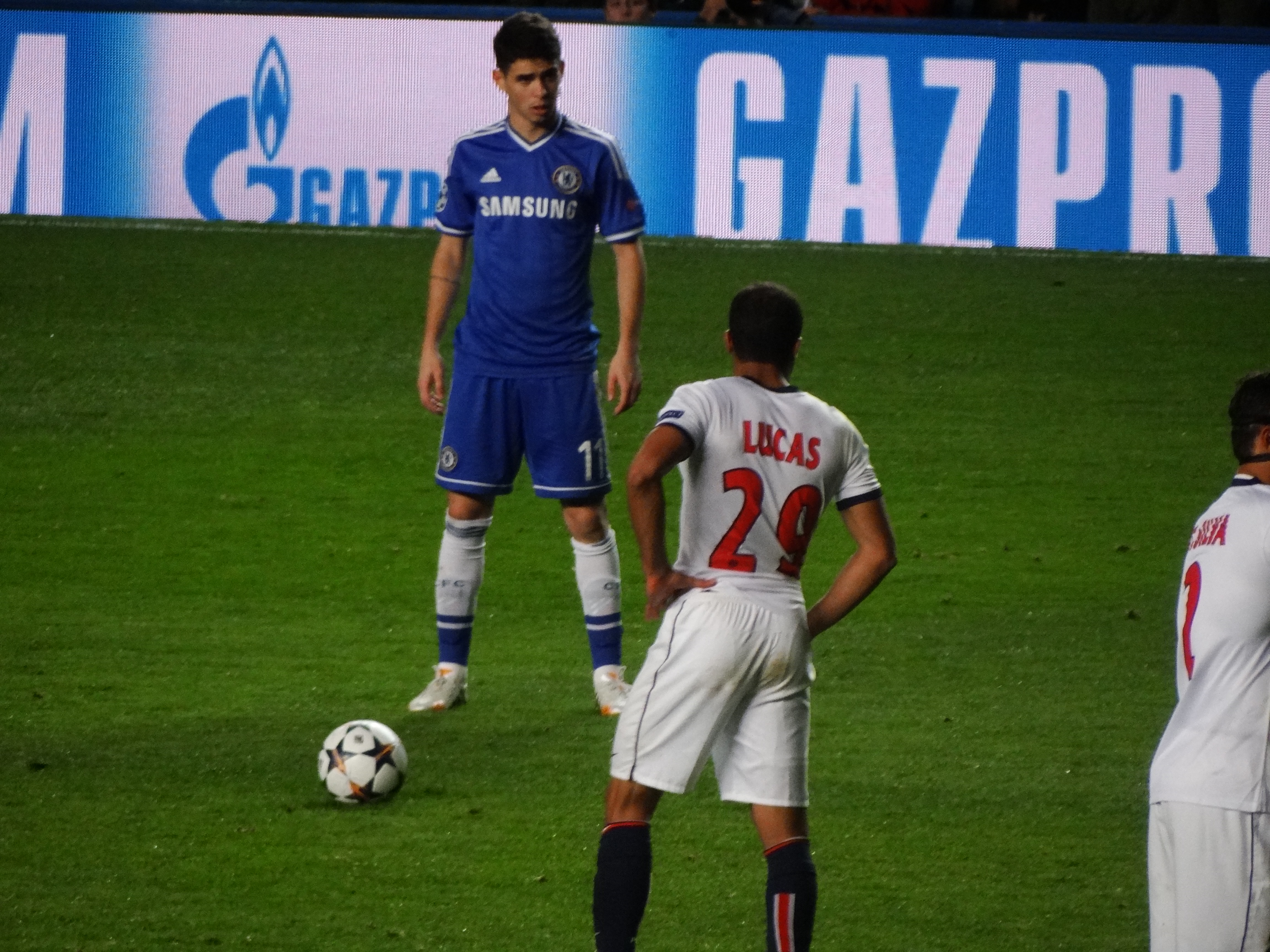
Oscar preparing a free kick in a UEFA Champions League match against Paris Saint-Germain on 8 April 2014

In the first match of the 2013–14 season on 18 August, Oscar scored Chelsea's opening goal in a 2–0 win over Hull City. He opened the scoring against local rivals Fulham in a 2–1 win on 21 September. On 1 January 2014 Oscar put in a match-winning performance against Southampton at St Mary's Stadium, scoring one and assisting two as Chelsea won the match 0–3. However, he was booked in that match for diving. Oscar scored fourth and fifth goals in Chelsea's 6–0 victory over Arsenal on 23 March, which was Arsène Wenger's 1000th match in charge of the club.

Before the start of the 2014–15 season, Oscar's shirt number 11 was given back to the returning Didier Drogba, and he instead took the number 8 vacated by Frank Lampard earlier in the summer. He said "Didier is a Chelsea legend and a senior player. I am happy for him to take the 11 and for me to take the 8. Lamps is another legend at this club and I hope I will be as successful in the shirt as he was." His early season success was rewarded in November as he signed a new contract with the club keeping him with the Blues until the end of the 2018–19 season. Oscar scored twice in the first half of Chelsea's 5–0 away win at Swansea City on 17 January 2015, exploiting a wayward pass by Gylfi Sigurðsson to open the scoring after 50 seconds. On 26 April, he was hospitalised after suffering a head injury following a collision with opposing goalkeeper David Ospina in a 0–0 away draw against Arsenal in the Premier League; he was released the following day.

Oscar scored Chelsea's first goal of the next season in an eventual 2–2 home draw with Swansea, being substituted early in the second half after the dismissal of goalkeeper Thibaut Courtois. On 16 September, he scored a penalty in a 4–0 win over Maccabi Tel Aviv in the first game of the Champions League group stage. He, Diego Costa and Cesc Fàbregas were abused by supporters who believed that the trio's slump in form had cost the job of popular manager José Mourinho; in the first game since his dismissal, on 26 December, Oscar slipped and missed a spot kick in a 2–2 home draw against Watford. The following 31 January, Oscar scored a first-half hat-trick in a 5–1 win at Milton Keynes Dons in the fourth round of the FA Cup.

On 26 October 2016, Oscar made his 200th appearance for Chelsea in a 2–1 League Cup defeat to West Ham United.

=== Shanghai Port ===
On 23 December 2016, Chinese Super League side Shanghai Port officially confirmed that the club had agreed on terms with Chelsea for the transfer of Oscar, to be completed during the January transfer window for a reported £60 million. The fee represented an Asian transfer record. Oscar was reported to have signed a four-year contract with a weekly salary of £400,000, equivalent to an annual salary of £20.8 million (US$26.5 million). The contract placed Oscar amongst the highest paid footballers in the world, annually during his 4-year tenure with the club. After signing for Shanghai SIPG, Oscar revealed that various European clubs were interested in signing him but decided to play in China as "China has incredible financial power and sometimes makes offers that players can't refuse." He subsequently mentioned that he was more concerned about his family, than of his own career. Furthermore, he added that after completing his contract with Shanghai SIPG, he was interested in returning to Europe as he remained motivated to play football at a high level.

The Brazilian made an immediate impression for his new club, scoring on his friendly debut against Saudi Arabian side Al-Batin. Oscar made his official debut on 7 February 2017 and scored the first goal of a 3–0 win over Thai club Sukhothai in the 2017 AFC Champions League qualifying play-off. On 11 April 2017, Oscar missed two penalty kicks as his team lost 1–0 in an AFC Champions League match against Urawa Red Diamonds. He scored his first domestic league goal for SIPG with a penalty on 21 April 2017 in a 3–0 home win against Hebei China Fortune. In a league match between Shanghai SIPG and Guangzhou R&F on 18 June 2017, Oscar assisted Hulk's equaliser in the 45+1 minute, however, afterwards as the opposition players complained to the referee that Hulk had been offside, Oscar twice purposely kicked the ball into Guangzhou players. In the ensuing brawl, both Li Tixiang and Fu Huan were sent off. Although Oscar himself was not booked for his role, he was later banned for 8 matches and fined 40,000 RMB for his role in starting the incident. In his second season, Oscar scored 12 goals as Shanghai won the league for the first time.

In December 2019, Oscar renewed his contract for a further 5 years at an annual salary of €24 million. The contract was signed a month before the Chinese government imposed an individual salary cap of €3 million a year for foreign players in the CSL, which lead to an exodus of the league's star players. He was appointed team captain following the departure of fellow Brazilian teammate Hulk.

In January 2022, Oscar was linked with a return to Europe and a move to FC Barcelona. He missed the start to the 2022 season due to family matters. Oscar returned to China in June to take part in Shanghai's last three matches in the first phase of the CSL, then again returned to Brazil during the league break in July. He agreed personal terms for a loan deal with Flamengo, but Shanghai Port shut down the deal. He once again returned to Shanghai in January 2023 to take part in the delayed Chinese FA Cup.

In March 2023, Oscar said that he would love to return to Chelsea one day. "Of course, it's a dream to come back to Chelsea because everyone knows the passion that I have for this club," he told Talksport. "It's the same passion I have for Shanghai. It's the two clubs I have played at for a long period. I have a lot of good memories at Chelsea and I also have a lot of good memories of Shanghai. But I'm still here and I still have dreams to play for this team."

Oscar told Brazilian newspaper Folha de S.Paulo in September 2024 that he would likely be leaving Shanghai at the end of the year. "I love Shanghai, but it's just too far away from home for us," he said. "We can't stay here forever. My mum is getting older, my sisters are having babies. We want to be closer to home." On 21 October 2024, he was involved in all three goals as Shanghai beat Central Coast Mariners 3–2 in the AFC Champions League Elite.

Square Mile reported that Oscar was the 6th highest-paid footballer in the world in 2024.

Oscar played his final game for the club against Gwangju in the AFC Champions League Elite on 3 December 2024.

=== Return to São Paulo ===
On 25 December 2024, Oscar secured a return to São Paulo, signing a 3-year contract. "I'm happy to be back in Brazil and to be able to play for Sao Paulo, which is the club where I started out, where I made my base and where I grew up," he said in a statement. "I thank you for the affection I have received on social media these past few days and I will do my best to achieve great things together." He made his debut in the second half of a friendly match against Cruzeiro on January 16, 2025.

=== Retirement ===
On 12 December 2025, Oscar informed São Paulo that he had decided to end his football career due to health problem caused by fainting during a medical examination. The termination of his contract with the club, which was still valid until 31 December 2027, occurred amicably and the athlete officially announced his retirement on 4 April 2026.

== International career ==
=== Youth ===
On 20 August 2011, Oscar scored three goals in the 2011 FIFA U-20 World Cup final win against Portugal, becoming the first player to score a hat-trick in the FIFA U-20 World Cup final. This performance was immediately compared to the 1966 hat trick by Geoff Hurst as only the second time a single player scored three goals in a World Cup final match.

=== 2012 Olympics ===
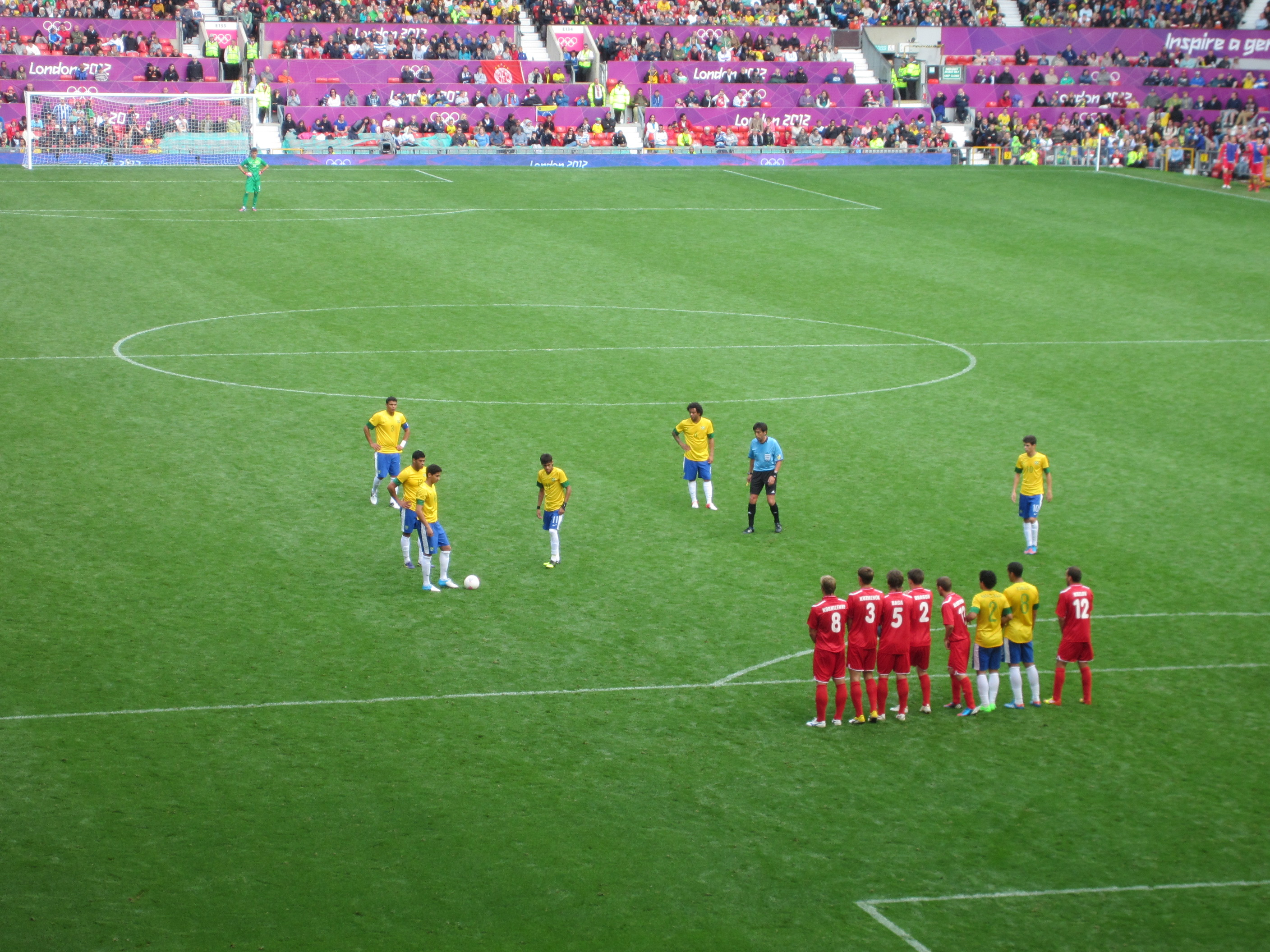
Oscar (wearing number 10) representing Brazil at Old Trafford during the 2012 Olympics.

Oscar was named into the Brazilian squad to compete at the Olympics in London. Oscar starred in Brazil's 3–2 victory over Egypt in the opening game, providing the assists for goals by Rafael and Leandro Damião. In Brazil's next game, a 3–1 victory over Belarus, Oscar netted the Seleção's third goal in injury time, after being played through by Neymar, to send the Brazilians into the quarter-finals. All goals in the Olympics was assisted or scored by Oscar and Neymar, the two prodigies who are both regarded as the exceptional talents coming from Brazil. Oscar provided two assists, one to Rômulo and another for Leandro Damião, as the Seleção defeated South Korea 3–0 in the semi-finals at Old Trafford on 7 August. Brazil went on to lose the gold medal match against Mexico 2–1.

=== Senior ===
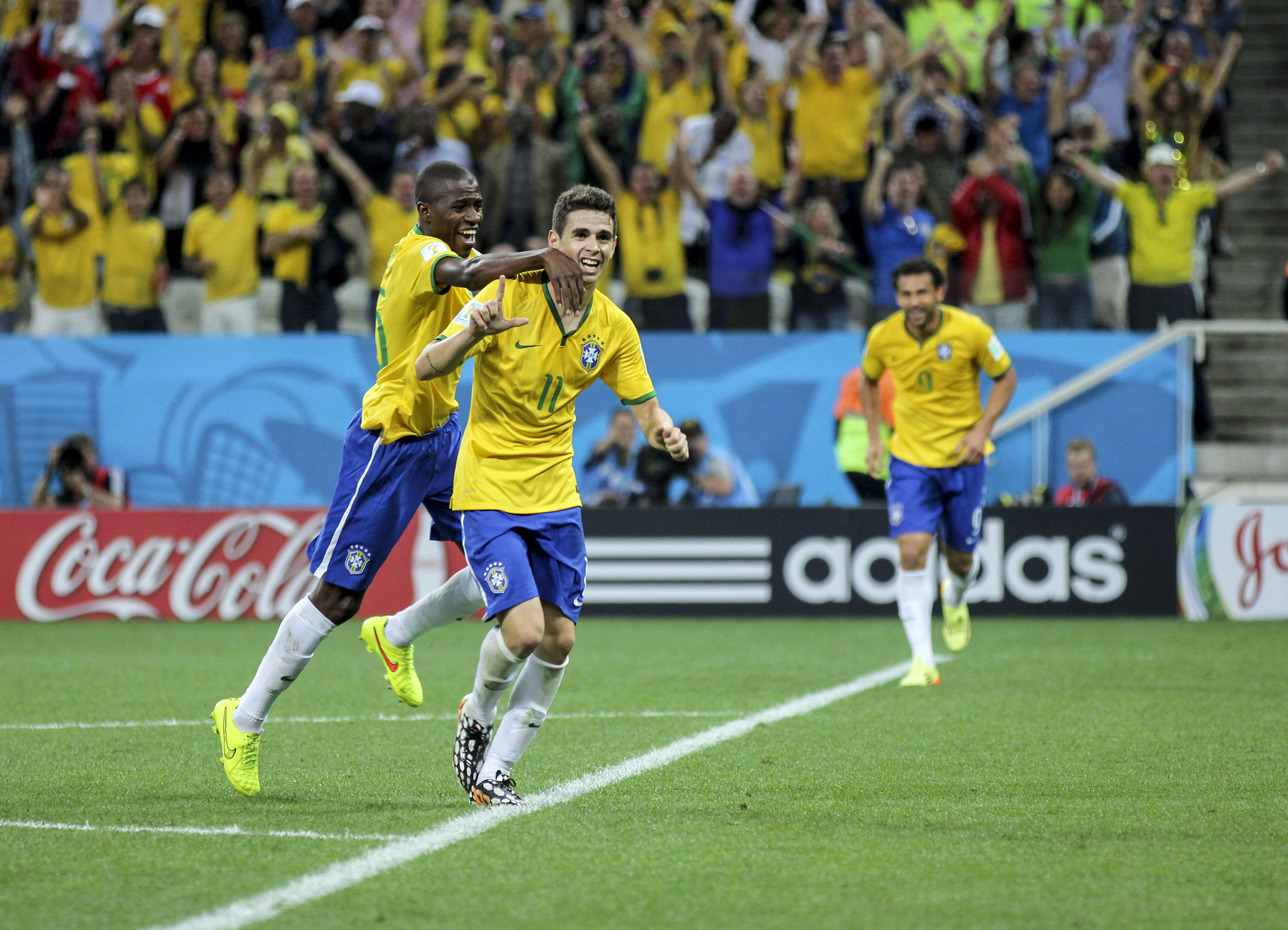
Oscar celebrates moments after scoring a goal against Croatia, in the first match of the 2014 FIFA World Cup.

Oscar was given his first senior call-up as a substitute in a 0–0 draw against Argentina. Due to injuries to the attacking midfielder Ganso, he saw his national team opportunities increase and was even preferred over more experienced playmakers on a number of occasions. In June 2012, Oscar scored his first international goal in a friendly match in New York City against Argentina, which Brazil went on to lose 4–3. He also scored a penalty kick against China as well as recording three assists in the 8–0 rout, before firing a brace against Iraq one month later.

On 25 March 2013 Oscar played against Russia at Stamford Bridge with fellow Chelsea teammates David Luiz and Ramires. He wore the nation's iconic 10 number shirt.

Oscar played and started in all of Brazil's games in the 2013 FIFA Confederations Cup as they beat Spain 3–0 in the final to claim the trophy. He provided the assist for the second goal in the final, scored by Neymar.

In the opening match of the 2014 FIFA World Cup, on 12 June against Croatia in São Paulo, Oscar scored in injury time with a toe-poke from outside the box for the last goal in a 3–1 win. In Brazil's record-breaking 7–1 semi-final defeat to Germany on 8 July, Oscar scored the only goal for Brazil in the 90th minute. Alongside Thiago Silva, he was one of two Brazilians included in the Team of the Tournament. He also played and started every game.

Due to an injury in training, Oscar was not included in Brazil's squad for the 2015 Copa América in Chile. He was last recalled to the squad in October 2016, for Brazil's 2018 World Cup qualifiers.

After nearly nine years without a call-up, in February 2025 Oscar was named as part of the 52 player preliminary longlist of players for the following month's 2026 FIFA World Cup qualifying matches, although did not feature in the final 23 man squad.

== Style of play ==
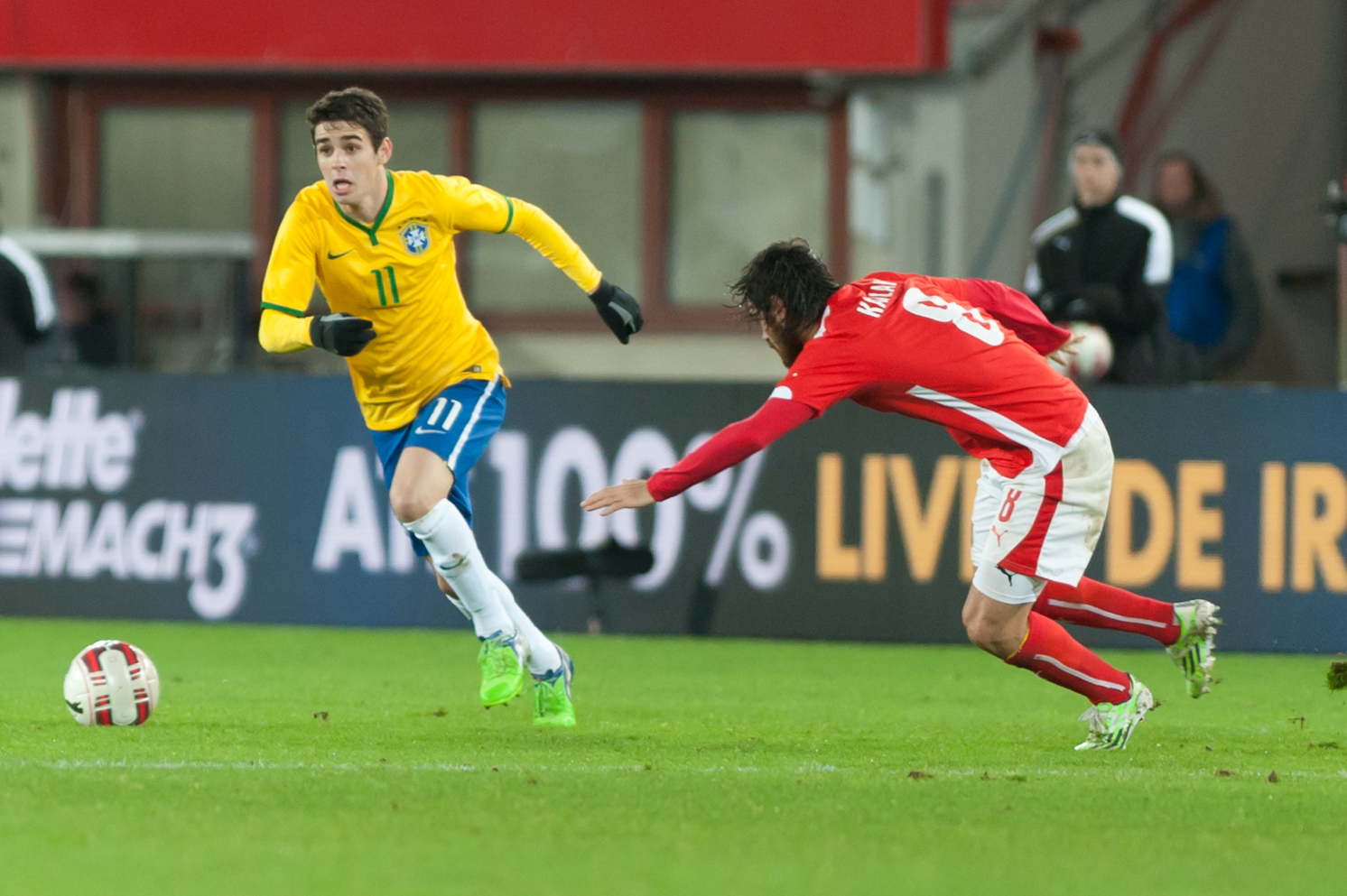
Oscar on the ball for Brazil in 2014.

Considered to be a highly talented and promising player in his youth, Oscar has drawn comparisons to players such as Mesut Özil and former Brazilian teammate Kaká due to his playmaking abilities. A quick, agile, and technically gifted player, with superb dribbling skills and an excellent first touch, Oscar is very fluid and creative in his runs. As an offensive playmaker, Oscar has great vision and is able to deliver precise short passes to his teammates, which enables him to play "killer balls". Oscar is also extremely effective in building up play in areas higher up the pitch. His cunning runs, as well as his skills, range of passing and finishing ability, make him a threat inside or near the opposing penalty area, and allow him to score goals in addition to creating goalscoring opportunities. Although he typically played either as a second striker or in a central attacking midfield position for Internacional, since his transfer to Chelsea, Oscar has been deployed in all three attacking midfield positions behind the central striker, in the centre as well as on either flank. Known for his vision, ability to pick out teammates in tight positions, and carve out chances in difficult situations, Oscar often acted as the catalyst in Chelsea's attacks during his time with the club, and was widely praised for his role in the team's Europa League success in 2013. Under Mourinho, Oscar was used as Chelsea's primary playmaker in midfield. A versatile player, he has also been praised by managers for being capable of playing in wider positions, as well as in his favoured role in the centre of the pitch. Oscar's energy, work-rate, tenacity, and ability to press opponents high up the pitch made him a favorite of his former Chelsea manager Mourinho, and also allowed him to play in deeper midfield positions, or even in a box-to-box role on occasion, in particular during his time with São Paulo and under his former Chelsea manager Antonio Conte. Despite his talent, however, he has accused by certain pundits – such as Nizaar Kinsella of Goal.com – of being inconsistent, and of failing to live up to his potential, in particular during his later Chelsea career, where he struggled to adapt to different systems and retain his place in the team's starting line-up.

== Personal life ==
Oscar's father was killed in a traffic accident in 1994. At the time, Oscar's mother was pregnant with his sister, Gabriela. Oscar said that while growing up, he remembered little of his father and wished his dad could have watched him play football during his childhood. Oscar also said he grew up in poverty and that his family had nothing. Oscar attributed his footballing success to his mother Sueli, who raised three children (including Oscar) alone. She earned money by making and selling clothes in the family's hometown, as she was unable to work for a company.

Oscar is married to his childhood sweetheart, Ludmila, who is a Japanese Brazilian. They have been together since 2009. They were married in 2011. Oscar is a Catholic who prays before each game to relax and get confidence for the match. He started taking English classes when he moved to London and became neighbors with former teammate Juan Mata and retired midfielder Giorgos Karagounis upon his arrival at the club. Oscar and his wife have a daughter, Júlia, who was born in 2014, and son, Caio, who was born in 2016.

== Career statistics ==
=== Club ===
Appearances and goals by club, season and competition
Club	Season	League			State league (Note: Includes Campeonato Paulista, Campeonato Gaúcho)		National cup (Note: Includes FA Cup, Chinese FA Cup)		League cup (Note: Includes Football League Cup)		Continental		Other		Total	
Club	Season	Division	Apps	Goals	Apps	Goals	Apps	Goals	Apps	Goals	Apps	Goals	Apps	Goals	Apps	Goals
São Paulo	2008	Série A	0	0	0	0	0	0	—		1 (Note: Appearance in Copa Sudamericana)	0	—		1	0
São Paulo	2009	Série A	11	0	1	0	0	0	—		1 (Note: Appearance(s) in Copa Libertadores)	0	—		13	0
São Paulo	Total		11	0	1	0	0	0	—		2	0	—		14	0
Internacional	2010	Série A	5	0	0	0	0	0	—		0	0	1 (Note: Appearance in FIFA Club World Cup)	0	6	0
Internacional	2011	Série A	26	10	11	0	0	0	—		6	3	1 (Note: Appearance in Recopa Sudamericana)	0	44	13
Internacional	2012	Série A	5	1	9	4	0	0	—		6	1	—		20	6
Internacional	Total		36	11	20	4	0	0	—		12	4	2	0	70	19
Chelsea	2012–13	Premier League	34	4	—		7	2	5	0	15 (Note: Six appearances and five goals in UEFA Champions League, nine appearances and one goal in UEFA Europa League)	6	3 (Note: One appearance in UEFA Super Cup, two appearances in FIFA Club World Cup)	0	64	12
Chelsea	2013–14	Premier League	33	8	—		3	2	0	0	10 (Note: Appearances in UEFA Champions League)	1	1 (Note: Appearance in UEFA Super Cup)	0	47	11
Chelsea	2014–15	Premier League	28	6	—		2	0	4	1	7	0	—		41	7
Chelsea	2015–16	Premier League	27	3	—		4	3	1	0	7	2	1 (Note: Appearance in FA Community Shield)	0	40	8
Chelsea	2016–17	Premier League	9	0	—		0	0	2	0	—		—		11	0
Chelsea	Total		131	21	—		16	7	12	1	39	9	5	0	203	38
Shanghai Port	2017	Chinese Super League	22	3	—		6	3	—		12 (Note: Appearance(s) in AFC Champions League)	3	—		40	9
Shanghai Port	2018	Chinese Super League	29	12	—		3	0	—		8	4	—		40	16
Shanghai Port	2019	Chinese Super League	28	9	—		3	2	—		10	3	1 (Note: Appearance in Chinese Super Cup)	0	42	14
Shanghai Port	2020	Chinese Super League	16	5	—		1	1	—		6	0	—		23	6
Shanghai Port	2021	Chinese Super League	22	5	—		3	0	—		0	0	—		25	5
Shanghai Port	2022	Chinese Super League	3	1	—		2	1	—		—		—		5	2
Shanghai Port	2023	Chinese Super League	30	9	—		2	0	—		1	0	—		33	9
Shanghai Port	2024	Chinese Super League	29	14	—		4	1	—		6	1	1	0	40	16
Shanghai Port	Total		179	58	—		24	8	—		43	11	2	0	248	77
São Paulo	2025	Série A	6	0	12	2	1	0	—		2	0	—		21	2
Career total			363	90	33	6	41	15	12	1	98	24	9	0	556	136

=== International ===
Appearances and goals by national team and year
National team	Year	Apps	Goals
Brazil	2011	2	0
Brazil	2012	10	4
Brazil	2013	16	4
Brazil	2014	16	3
Brazil	2015	4	1
Total		48	12

Scores and results list Brazil's goal tally first.

List of international goals scored by Oscar
No.	Date	Venue	Opponent	Score	Result	Competition
1.	9 June 2012	MetLife Stadium, East Rutherford, United States	Argentina	2–2	3–4	Friendly
2.	10 September 2012	Estádio do Arruda, Recife, Brazil	China	8–0	8–0	Friendly
3.	11 October 2012	Swedbank Stadion, Malmö, Sweden	Iraq	1–0	6–0	Friendly
4.	11 October 2012	Swedbank Stadion, Malmö, Sweden	Iraq	2–0	6–0	Friendly
5.	21 March 2013	Stade de Genève, Geneva, Switzerland	Italy	2–0	2–2	Friendly
6.	9 June 2013	Arena do Grêmio, Porto Alegre, Brazil	France	1–0	3–0	Friendly
7.	12 October 2013	Seoul World Cup Stadium, Seoul, South Korea	South Korea	2–0	2–0	Friendly
8.	15 October 2013	Beijing National Stadium, Beijing, China	Zambia	1–0	2–0	Friendly
9.	5 March 2014	Soccer City, Johannesburg, South Africa	South Africa	1–0	5–0	Friendly
10.	12 June 2014	Arena Corinthians, São Paulo, Brazil	Croatia	3–1	3–1	2014 FIFA World Cup
11.	8 July 2014	Estádio Mineirão, Belo Horizonte, Brazil	Germany	1–7	1–7	2014 FIFA World Cup
12.	26 March 2015	Stade de France, Saint-Denis, France	France	1–1	3–1	Friendly

== Honours ==
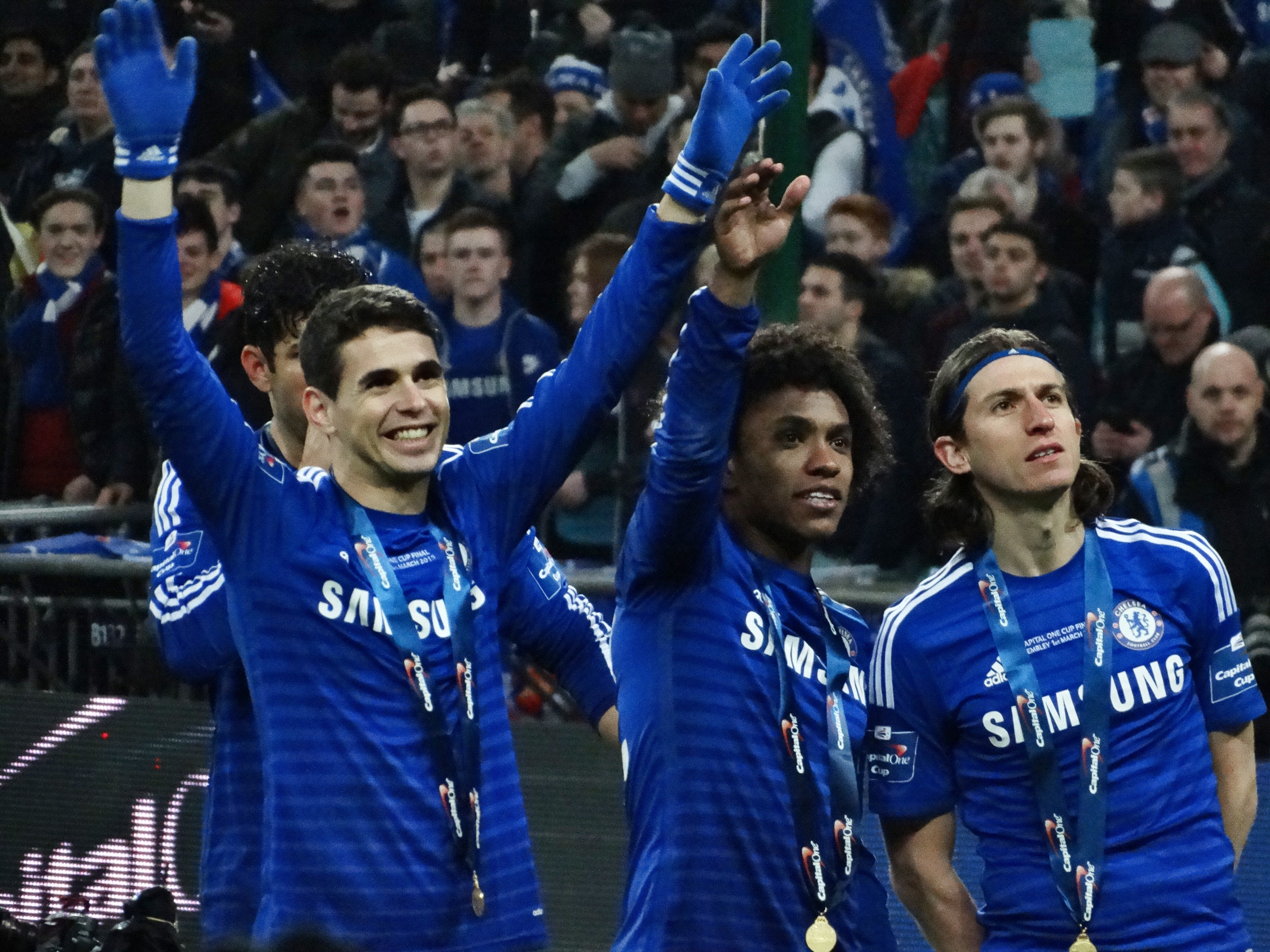
Oscar (left) and former teammates Diego Costa, Willian and Filipe Luís celebrate winning the 2015 Football League Cup final with Chelsea

Internacional

- Recopa Sudamericana: 2011
- Campeonato Gaúcho: 2011, 2012

Chelsea

- Premier League: 2014–15, 2016–17
- Football League Cup: 2014–15
- UEFA Europa League: 2012–13
- FIFA Club World Cup runner-up: 2012

Shanghai Port

- Chinese Super League: 2018, 2023, 2024
- Chinese FA Cup: 2024
- Chinese FA Super Cup: 2019; runner-up: 2017

Brazil U20

- South American Youth Football Championship: 2011
- FIFA U-20 World Cup: 2011

Brazil U23

- Summer Olympics Silver Medal: 2012

Brazil

- FIFA Confederations Cup: 2013

Individual

- FIFA World Cup All-Star Team: 2014
- Chelsea Goal of the Year: 2012–13 vs. Juventus, 2014–15 vs. Queens Park Rangers
- Chinese Super League Team of the Year: 2018
- AFC Champions League OPTA Best XI: 2019
