= Walter (footballer, born 1989) =

Brazilian footballer

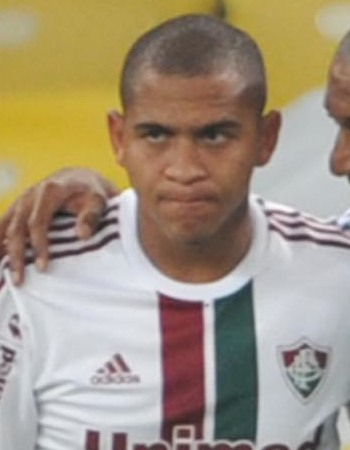
- Walter playing with Fluminense in 2014

Personal information
- Full name: Walter Henrique da Silva
- Date of birth: 22 July 1989 (age 37)
- Place of birth: Recife, Brazil
- Height: 1.76 m (5 ft 9 in)
- Position: Striker

Team information
- Current team: Tupy

Youth career
- 2000: Sport
- 2002–2004: Santa Cruz
- 2004: Vitória
- 2004–2006: São José-RS
- 2007: Internacional

Senior career*
Years	Team	Apps	(Gls)
2007	São José-RS	8	(0)
2008–2010	Internacional	37	(9)
2010–2019	Porto	19	(7)
2012	→ Cruzeiro (loan)	8	(2)
2012–2013	→ Goiás (loan)	74	(40)
2014	→ Fluminense (loan)	44	(8)
2015–2016	→ Athletico Paranaense (loan)	59	(13)
2016–2017	→ Goiás (loan)	15	(3)
2017	→ Atlético Goianiense (loan)	25	(5)
2018	→ Paysandu (loan)	8	(1)
2018	→ CSA (loan)	15	(2)
2020–2021	Athletico Paranaense	17	(0)
2021	Vitória	2	(0)
2021	São Caetano	6	(0)
2021	Botafogo-SP	11	(3)
2022	Santa Cruz	8	(3)
2022	Amazonas	2	(0)
2022	Goiânia	6	(0)
2023	Afogados	5	(1)
2023	Pelotas	4	(0)
2023	São Borja	1	(0)
2024	Rolim de Moura	1	(0)
2025	Guarany-AL	2	(0)
2025–	Tupy		

International career
2009	Brazil U20	9	(5)
- * Club domestic league appearances and goals as of 21:23, 8 May 2025 (UTC)

Walter Henrique da Silva (born 22 July 1989), known simply as Walter, is a Brazilian professional footballer who plays as a striker for Associação Tupy de Esportes.

== Early life ==
Born in Recife, Pernambuco, Walter was the youngest of six siblings born to his mother Edith, all the four males' names starting with the letter "W" (himself, Waldemir, Waldex and Wandeork). During his childhood, he viewed the dead bodies of two people who had just been murdered inside a bus, including that of his brother Waldemir at the age of 18 due to gang-related issues.

== Club career ==
=== Early years ===
Walter started his career with Sport Club do Recife, finishing his youth development at SC Internacional after joining its junior team in 2007. He made his professional debut two years later.

Walter played 11 matches in his first season in the Série A, but failed to score any goals. In May 2009, he suffered a serious knee injury which sidelined him for several months.

=== Porto ===
In August 2010, Walter joined FC Porto from Portugal, signing a five-year contract. The Primeira Liga club acquired the player's registration rights and 75% of his economic rights from Uruguayan side C.A. Rentistas for €6 million, and later sold 25% to Pearl Design Holding Ltd. (a UK shell company, directed by Mário Jorge Queiroz e Castro) for €2.125 million; Internacional announced in its annual accounts that the club had received R$9,192,000 in transfer fee (around €4 million), but part of that was re-distributed to third parties for R$1,980,033– it was also reported that the side owned 50% of the player's economic rights, with the other half belonging to third parties.

Walter played his first official game for Porto on 19 August 2010 in a UEFA Europa League play-off round against K.R.C. Genk, featuring eight minutes in a 3–0 away win. On 16 October 2010 he made his first start, scoring a hat-trick in the 4–1 home victory over A.D. Os Limianos in the third round of the Taça de Portugal. The following month, again as a starter, he netted his first league goal, at home against Portimonense SC (2–0).

Walter spent the vast majority of his first season as a backup to Radamel Falcao, but managed to finish with ten goals in all competitions in 25 appearances. On 15 October 2011, he scored four in a 8–0 away rout of C.A. Pêro Pinheiro in the domestic cup.

Subsequently, Walter was loaned several times by Porto, alternating between his country's Série A and B. Throughout his career, he struggled immensely with weight problems.

In August 2018, while at the service of Centro Sportivo Alagoano, Walter was arrested at his home in Maceió, after allegedly pointing a toy gun to an Eletrobras employee. On 11 December, he tested positive for furosemide and sibutramine metabolites after a match against Grêmio Esportivo Brasil, being suspended until further notice. The banned substances were found in prescription drugs he had been taking to fight his obesity problem.

== International career ==
Walter played with Brazil under-20s in the 2009 South American Championship. He scored five goals in the tournament held in Venezuela, being crowned top scorer as the national team won their tenth title in the category.

== Career statistics ==
As of 22 May 2023

Appearances and goals by club, season and competition
Club	Season	League			State League (Note: Includes Campeonato Gaúcho, Campeonato Mineiro, Campeonato Goiano, Campeonato Carioca, Campeonato Baiano, Campeonato Paulista, Campeonato Pernambucano and Campeonato Amazonense)		Cup (Note: Includes Copa do Brasil and Taça de Portugal)		League Cup (Note: Includes Taça da Liga)		Continental (Note: Includes Copa Libertadores, UEFA Champions League, UEFA Europa League and UEFA Super Cup)		Other (Note: Includes Supertaça Cândido de Oliveira, Primeira Liga (Brazil), Copa Verde, Copa do Nordeste and Copa Paulista)		Total	
Club	Season	Division	Apps	Goals	Apps	Goals	Apps	Goals	Apps	Goals	Apps	Goals	Apps	Goals	Apps	Goals
São José-RS	2007	Gaúcho	—		8	0	—		—		—		—		8	0
Internacional	2008	Série A	11	0	—		—		—		—		—		11	0
Internacional	2009	Série A	0	0	5	3	0	0	—		—		—		5	3
Internacional	2010	Série A	6	2	15	4	—		—		8	2	—		29	8
Internacional	Total		17	2	20	7	0	0	—		8	2	—		45	11
Porto	2010–11	Primeira Liga	13	5	—		4	4	3	1	5	0	0	0	25	10
Porto	2011–12	Primeira Liga	6	2	—		2	4	0	0	0	0	0	0	8	6
Porto	Total		19	7	—		6	8	3	1	5	0	0	0	33	16
Cruzeiro	2012	Série A	0	0	8	2	3	1	—		—		—		11	3
Goiás	2012	Série B	28	16	—		—		—		—		—		28	16
Goiás	2013	Série A	32	13	14	11	8	5	—		—		—		54	29
Goiás	Total		60	29	14	11	8	5	—		—		—		82	45
Fluminense	2014	Série A	23	2	11	6	5	1	—		1	0	—		40	9
Fluminense	2015	Série A	0	0	10	0	0	0	—		0	0	—		10	0
Fluminense	Total		23	2	21	6	5	1	—		1	0	—		50	9
Athletico Paranaense	2015	Série A	32	9	—		2	1	—		4	1	—		48	11
Athletico Paranaense	2016	Série A	19	3	8	1	4	1	—		—		4	0	35	5
Athletico Paranaense	Total		51	12	8	1	6	2	—		4	1	4	0	83	16
Goiás	2016	Série B	10	3	—		—		—		—		—		10	3
Goiás	2017	Série B	0	0	5	0	1	0	—		—		—		6	0
Goiás	Total		10	3	5	0	1	0	—		—		—		16	3
Atlético Goianiense	2017	Série A	25	5	—		—		—		—		—		25	5
Paysandu	2018	Série B	0	0	8	1	0	0	—		—		4	2	12	3
CSA	2018	Série B	15	2	—		—		—		—		—		15	2
Athletico Paranaense	2020	Série A	17	0	—		1	0	—		3	1	—		21	1
Vitória	2021	Série B	0	0	2	0	1	0	—		—		1	0	4	0
Botafogo-SP	2021	Série C	11	3	—		—		—		—		5	0	16	3
Santa Cruz	2022	Série D	0	0	8	3	—		—		—		—		8	3
Amazonas	2022	Série D	0	0	2	0	—		—		—		—		2	0
Goiânia	2022	Goiano 2ª Divisão	—		6	0	—		—		—		—		6	0
Afogados	2023	Pernambucano	—		5	1	—		—		—		—		5	1
Pelotas	2023	Gaúcho Série A2	—		0	0	—		—		—		—		0	0
Career total			248	65	115	32	31	17	3	1	21	4	14	2	442	121

== Honours ==
Internacional

- Copa Libertadores: 2010

Porto

- Primeira Liga: 2010–11, 2011–12
- Taça de Portugal: 2010–11
- UEFA Europa League: 2010–11

Goiás

- Campeonato Brasileiro Série B: 2012
- Campeonato Goiano: 2013

Atlético Paranaense

- Campeonato Paranaense: 2016

Brazil

- South American Youth Football Championship: 2009

Individual

- Campeonato Brasileiro Série A Team of the Year: 2013
