= Delson Ferreira =

Brazilian footballer (born 1980)

Delson
Personal information
- Full name: Delson Ferreira
- Date of birth: 26 July 1980 (age 46)
- Place of birth: Uberaba, Brazil
- Height: 1.76 m (5 ft 9 in)
- Position: Defensive midfielder

Youth career
- 1994–1999: Nacional-MG

Senior career*
| Years | Team | Apps | (Gls) |
| 1999 | Grêmio Inhumense | | |
| 2000–2001 | Grêmio Anápolis | | |
| 2001 | → CRAC (loan) | | |
| 2001–2004 | Salgueiros | 89 | (2) |
| 2004–2009 | Rio Ave | 124 | (7) |
| 2009–2010 | AEL | 9 | (0) |
| 2010 | → Olhanense (loan) | 11 | (0) |
| 2010–2011 | Olhanense | 9 | (0) |
| 2011–2012 | Naval | 3 | (0) |
| 2012 | Uberaba | | |
| 2012–2013 | Vitória Riboque | 8 | (2) |
| 2013 | Merceana | | |
| 2014 | Nacional-MG | ? | (1) |
- * Club domestic league appearances and goals

Delson Ferreira (born 26 July 1980), known as Delson, is a Brazilian retired footballer who played as defensive midfielder. He also held a Portuguese passport.

== Football career ==
Born in Uberaba, Minas Gerais, Delson began playing with Grêmio Esportivo Inhumense, moving to Portugal in 2001 to represent S.C. Salgueiros (by then in the Primeira Liga). He made his debut in the competition on 16 September 2001, playing 90 minutes in a 1–0 home win against S.C. Braga.

As the club from Paranhos folded after the 2003–04 season, Delson joined Rio Ave FC, where he became an instant first-choice. After suffering relegation in 2006, he contributed with 24 matches and two goals to the team's return to the top division after two years.

In late June 2009, Delson signed with Greece's Athlitiki Enosi Larissa FC. In January of the following year, however, he returned to Portugal, helping lowly S.C. Olhanense retain its top flight status and moving to the Algarve side permanently at end of the campaign.
