= Emídio Rafael =

Portuguese footballer

Personal information
- Full name: Emídio Rafael Augusto da Silva
- Date of birth: 24 January 1986 (age 40)
- Place of birth: Lisbon, Portugal
- Height: 1.82 m (6 ft 0 in)
- Position: Left-back

Youth career
- 1995–2005: Sporting CP

Senior career*
Years	Team	Apps	(Gls)
2005–2007	Sporting CP	0	(0)
2005–2006	→ Casa Pia (loan)	16	(1)
2006–2007	→ Real Massamá (loan)	26	(2)
2007–2009	Portimonense	46	(1)
2009–2010	Académica	26	(1)
2010–2013	Porto	5	(0)
2013	Braga	1	(0)
2013	Braga B	17	(0)
2013–2014	Platanias	11	(0)
2014–2015	Estoril	17	(2)
2015–2016	Académica	9	(0)
Total		174	(7)

International career
2004	Portugal U18	5	(0)
2004	Portugal U19	3	(0)
2010	Portugal U23	1	(0)
- * Club domestic league appearances and goals

Emídio Rafael Augusto da Silva (born 24 January 1986) is a Portuguese former professional footballer who played as a left-back.

In a career marred by injuries after signing with Porto in 2010, he played 58 matches in the Primeira Liga over six seasons while scoring three goals, also appearing for Académica (two stints), Braga and Estoril in the competition. In the Segunda Liga, he scored twice from 63 appearances.

== Club career ==
Born in Lisbon, Rafael was a youth graduate at Sporting CP, but never represented its first team officially. On loan, he made his senior debut in the third division, spending one season apiece with Casa Pia A.C. and Real S.C. (both in the Lisbon area) and being released in 2007.

Subsequently, Rafael signed for Portimonense S.C. in the Segunda Liga, being first-choice in his first season and regularly used in the following. In 2009–10, he made his Primeira Liga debut with Académica de Coimbra, his first appearance in the competition being on 13 September 2009 in a 2–1 away loss against S.C. Olhanense; he only missed four league games, scoring once as the Students easily retained their status.

On 10 July 2010, Rafael followed manager André Villas-Boas to FC Porto after agreeing to a three-year contract. He was rarely selected for matchday squads in the first months at his new club, but profited from a run of injuries in the first team to earn more playing time. On 29 January 2011, he scored in a 2–2 draw at Gil Vicente F.C. in the group stage of the Taça da Liga, but also sustained an horrific last-minute injury to his foot, being sidelined for well more than a year; he finished his first season with 11 competitive appearances and two goals.

Rafael joined S.C. Braga in January 2013, until the end of the campaign with the possibility of a three-year extension. After his contract expired, he moved to Platanias F.C. of Super League Greece. However, just six months later he returned to Portugal and signed a one-and-a-half-year deal with G.D. Estoril Praia.

On 8 June 2015, free agent Rafael rejoined Académica for two years. On 10 March 2017, not having been able to overcome his recurring injury problems, the 31-year-old announced his retirement and began working for scouting agency Gold World Stars.

== Honours ==
Porto

- Primeira Liga: 2010–11
- Taça de Portugal: 2010–11
