= Marienfeld =

Coordinates: 50°53′N 6°44′E

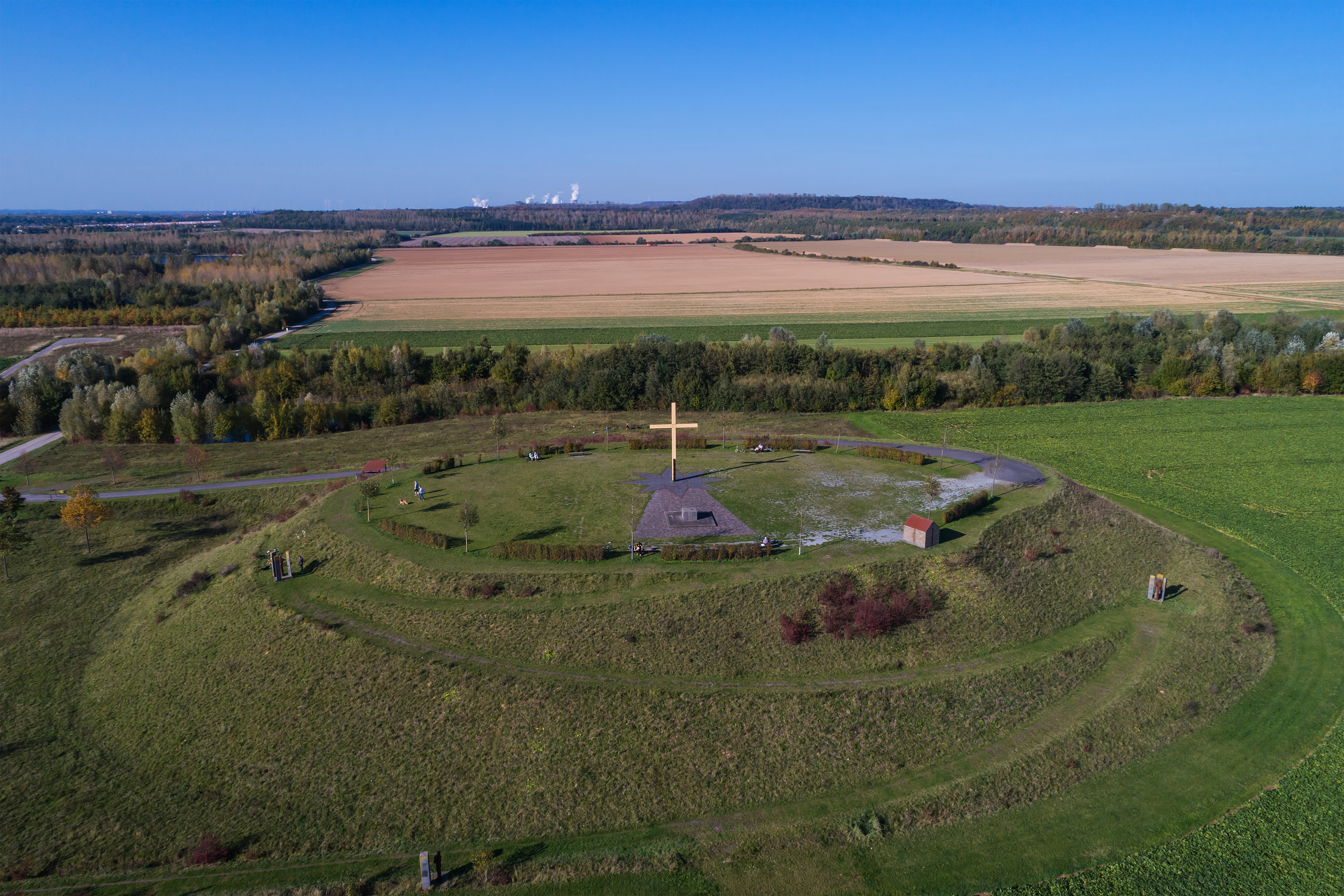
Marienfeld with "Pope hill", October 2017.

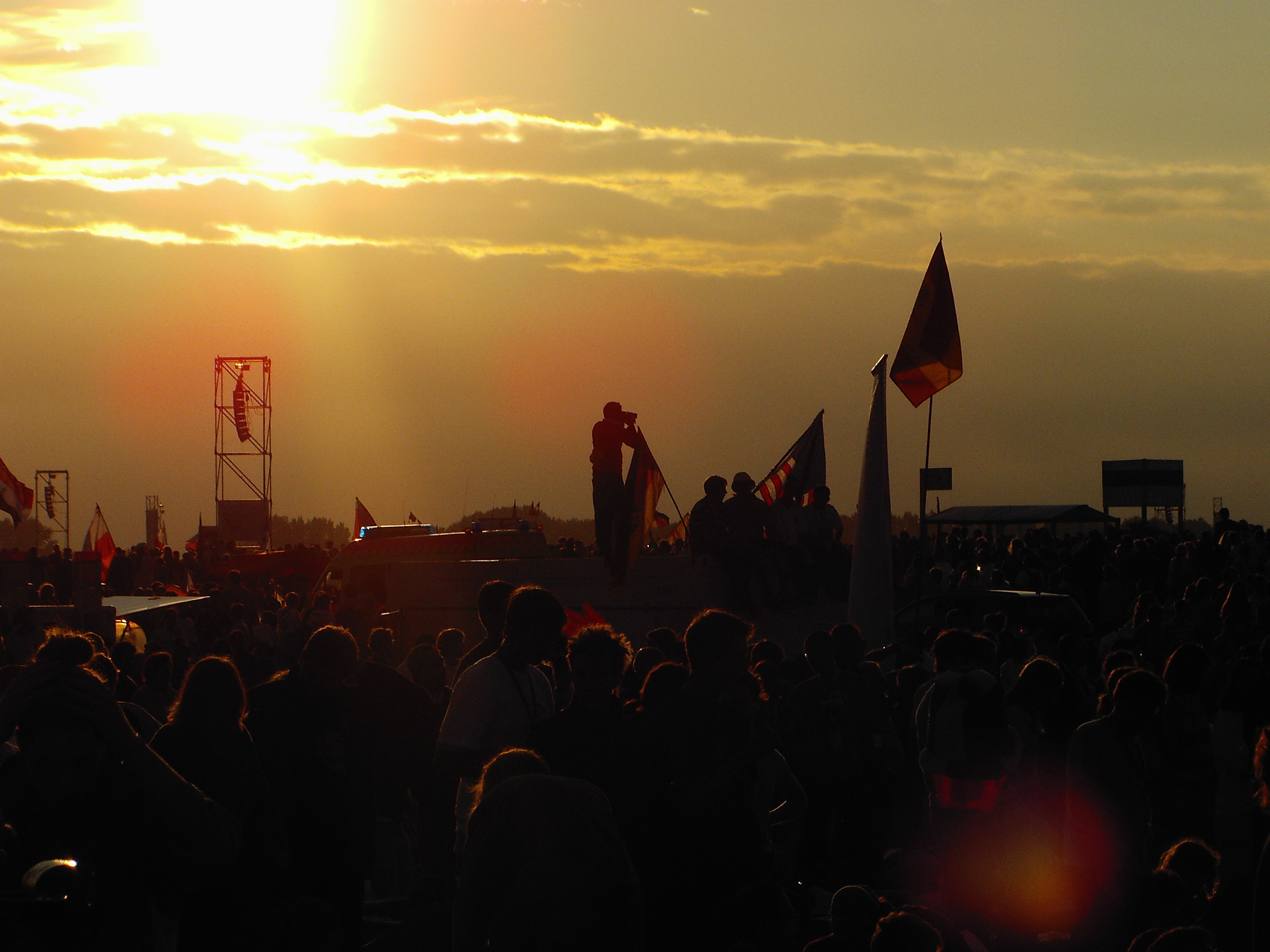
Marienfeld at dusk after the vigil with the Pope - Final Saturday night of World Youth Day 2005

Marienfeld is a large (2.6 km^{2} / 640 acres) grassy field on the reclaimed site of a former open-pit lignite mine about 20 km (12 mi) south-west of Cologne Cathedral in the city of Cologne, Germany, straddling the towns of Frechen and Kerpen. The mine area was named Marienfeld (German: Mary's Field) and landscaped in order to serve as the site of the Catholic Church's 20th World Youth Day in 2005.

== Overview ==
Preparations for the World Youth Day began in September 2004. A 10-m (33-ft) Pope Hill (German: Papsthügel) was constructed since April 2005, so Pope Benedict XVI could be visible amidst an estimated 1 to 2 million visitors when he presided over the festival's concluding Sunday Mass on August 21, 2005. An altar was built at the top of the hill, which was christened the Mountain of the 70 Nations by Cardinal Meisner, because little pieces of earth were brought from church delegates of 70 countries. The hill was built by Bilfinger Berger AG, which poured over 80,000 m^{3} (2.8 million cu. ft) of earth carried in around 200 trucks per day.

The name Marienfeld is derived from a Pietà sculpted in 1420 from French limestone that has been a destination for pilgrims seeking to venerate the Virgin Mary for centuries. The sculpture has moved numerous times. It was first placed in a chapel at a location around 1 km from the present Marienfeld, then near the town of Grefrath. It was moved in 1730 by the nuns from the nearby convent of Bottenbroich to the parish church of Bottenbroich, the Church of the Assumption of Mary (St. Maria Himmelfahrt), an old church (built between 1479 and 1484) located in part of what is now Marienfeld. In 1948, the church was demolished, partly due to heavy damage sustained during World War II and partly as part of the resettlement of the town of Bottenbroich to make way for an open-pit lignite mine being opened on the site. The parishes of Bottenbroich and Grefrath were combined, and the Pietà was moved to a new parish church in Grefrath, built in 1949. However, Grefrath itself was gradually resettled between 1952 and 1965 to make way for the expansion of the lignite mine, so the Pietà was moved again in 1963 to its present location at the parish church of Frechen-Grefrath (2 km from Marienfeld), where it remains on display.

The area used for the World Youth day celebrations should not be confused with the town of Marienfeld in the Gutersloh district of Germany, where the Portugal national football team stayed and which was used as a training area for the team during the 2006 FIFA World Cup and chosen again by it as its base for the UEFA Euro 2024.
