= Thiago Humberto =

Brazilian footballer

Personal information
- Full name: Thiago Humberto Gomes
- Date of birth: July 6, 1985 (age 41)
- Place of birth: Lins, São Paulo, Brazil
- Height: 1.83 m (6 ft 0 in)
- Position: Attacking midfielder

Team information
- Current team: Linense

Youth career
- 2002–2004: Barueri

Senior career*
Years	Team	Apps	(Gls)
2005–2009	Barueri	71	(16)
2010–2013	Internacional	2	(0)
2010	→ Vitória (loan)	8	(1)
2011	→ Ceará (loan)	27	(4)
2012	→ Goiás (loan)	4	(0)
2012	→ América-MG (loan)	8	(1)
2013	Ceará	7	(0)
2014	Criciúma	0	(0)
2014	Paraná	13	(1)
2015	Novo Hamburgo	0	(0)
2016–2019	Linense	12	(7)
2016	→ Criciúma (loan)	10	(2)
2019	Novorizontino	4	(1)
2020–	Linense	0	(0)
- * Club domestic league appearances and goals as of 15:37, 25 June 2019 (UTC)

Thiago Humberto Gomes (born July 6, 1985, in Lins), usually known as Thiago Humberto, is a Brazilian football attacking midfielder, who plays for Linense.

== Titles ==
- São Paulo A3 State League: 2005
- São Paulo A2 State League: 2006
- São Paulo Interior League: 2008
