= 2025 São Paulo FC season =

São Paulo
2025 season
- Chairman: Julio Casares
- Manager: Luis Zubeldía (until 16 June 2025); Hernán Crespo (after 18 June 2025)
- Stadium: Morumbi
- Campeonato Brasileiro Série A: 8th
- Campeonato Paulista: Semi-final
- Copa do Brasil: Round of 16
- Copa Libertadores: Quarter-finals
- Top goalscorer: League: Luciano (9); All: Luciano (16)
- Highest home attendance: 57,559 (19 August vs. Atlético Nacional)
- Lowest home attendance: 6,468 (23 November vs. Juventude)
- Average home league attendance: 28,670
- Biggest defeat: 0–6 (27 November vs. Fluminense)
Home colors	Away colors	Home (alt) colors

The 2025 season was São Paulo's 96th season in the club's history and their 65th in the top-flight of Brazilian football. Along with Série A, São Paulo competed in the Campeonato Paulista, Copa do Brasil and Copa Libertadores.

== First-team squad ==
As of 9 September 2025

Note: Flags indicate national team as defined under FIFA eligibility rules; some limited exceptions apply. Players may hold more than one non-FIFA nationality.

No.	Pos.	Nation	Player
2	DF	ITA	Rafael Tolói
5	DF	ECU	Robert Arboleda
6	DF	POR	Cédric Soares
7	FW	BRA	Lucas Moura (vice-captain)
8	MF	BRA	Oscar
9	FW	ARG	Jonathan Calleri (captain)
10	FW	BRA	Luciano
11	FW	BRA	Ferreira
12	GK	BRA	Leandro
13	DF	ARG	Enzo Díaz (on loan from River Plate)
14	FW	CHI	Gonzalo Tapia (on loan from River Plate)
15	MF	BRA	Rodriguinho
16	MF	BRA	Luiz Gustavo
17	FW	BRA	André Silva
18	DF	BRA	Wendell
19	FW	ARG	Juan Dinenno (on loan from Cruzeiro)
20	MF	BRA	Marcos Antônio (on loan from Lazio)

No.	Pos.	Nation	Player
21	MF	PAR	Damián Bobadilla
22	DF	BRA	Maílton
23	GK	BRA	Rafael (3rd-captain)
25	MF	BRA	Alisson
28	DF	ARG	Alan Franco
29	MF	BRA	Pablo Maia
32	DF	VEN	Nahuel Ferraresi
33	MF	BRA	Luan
35	DF	BRA	Sabino
36	DF	BRA	Patryck Lanza
42	DF	BRA	Maik
43	MF	BRA	Felipe Negrucci
45	FW	BRA	Lucca Marques
46	MF	BRA	Hugo Leonardo
49	FW	BRA	Ryan Francisco
50	GK	BRA	Young
77	FW	ARG	Emiliano Rigoni (on loan from León)

=== Youth players ===
As of 20 August 2025 (Copa São Paulo de Futebol Jr. squad, Campeonato Paulista "B" list and others)

Note: Flags indicate national team as defined under FIFA eligibility rules; some limited exceptions apply. Players may hold more than one non-FIFA nationality.

No.	Pos.	Nation	Player
24	GK	BRA	Felipe Preis
—	GK	BRA	João Paulo
40	GK	BRA	João Pedro
—	GK	BRA	Luciano
41	DF	BRA	Andrade
—	DF	BRA	Angelo
—	DF	BRA	Felipe
44	DF	BRA	Guilherme Reis
—	DF	BRA	Henrique Bell
—	DF	BRA	Hugo Martins
34	DF	BRA	Igão
—	DF	BRA	Igor Felisberto
53	DF	BRA	Isac Silvestre
—	DF	BRA	Luis Osorio
—	DF	BRA	Marques Rickelme
56	DF	BRA	Nicolas Bosshardt
—	DF	IDN	Welber Jardim

No.	Pos.	Nation	Player
38	MF	BRA	Bezerra
—	MF	BRA	Djhordney
—	MF	BRA	Enzo Juan
—	MF	BRA	Guilherme Fumaça
—	MF	BRA	Matheus Ferreira
—	MF	BRA	Nicolas Borges
52	MF	BRA	Pedro Ferreira
—	MF	BRA	Samuel Monteiro
—	FW	BRA	Brenno
—	FW	BRA	Gustavo Miranda
—	FW	BRA	Gustavo Santana
—	FW	COL	Juan Potes
—	FW	BRA	Lucyan
—	FW	BRA	Matheus Menezes
53	FW	BRA	Paulinho
—	FW	BRA	Tetê
—	FW	BRA	Thierry Henry

=== Other players under contract ===
Note: Flags indicate national team as defined under FIFA eligibility rules; some limited exceptions apply. Players may hold more than one non-FIFA nationality.

No.	Pos.	Nation	Player
—	GK	BRA	Roberto
—	DF	BRA	Belém

No.	Pos.	Nation	Player
—	MF	BRA	Cauã Lucca
—	MF	SEN	Iba Ly

=== Out on loan ===
Note: Flags indicate national team as defined under FIFA eligibility rules; some limited exceptions apply. Players may hold more than one non-FIFA nationality.

No.	Pos.	Nation	Player
—	GK	BRA	Jandrei (at Juventude until 31 December 2025)
—	DF	BRA	João Moreira (at Porto B until 5 January 2026)
—	DF	BRA	Raphael Gogoni (at Boston City Brasil until 31 December 2025)

No.	Pos.	Nation	Player
—	MF	ARG	Giuliano Galoppo (at River Plate until 31 December 2025)
—	FW	BRA	Erick (at Vitória until 31 December 2025)

=== Retired numbers ===
- 01 – (Brazil) Rogério Ceni, Goalkeeper (1990–2015)

== Transfers ==
=== Transfers in ===
Entry date	Position	Player	From club	Fee	Ref.
10 December 2024	MF	(Brazil) Hugo Leonardo	(Brazil) Ska Brasil	R$ 0.4 M	
12 December 2024	MF	(Brazil) Luan	(Brazil) Vitória	End of loan	
23 December 2024	MF	(Brazil) Oscar	(China) Shanghai Port	Free transfer	
31 December 2024	DF	(Brazil) Ythallo	(Canada) Toronto FC II	End of loan	
27 January 2025	DF	(Portugal) Cédric Soares	Free agent	Free transfer	
3 February 2025	DF	(Brazil) Wendell	(Portugal) Porto	Free transfer	
25 February 2025	DF	(Brazil) Isac Silvestre	(Brazil) Red Bull Bragantino	Undisclosed	
21 March 2025	MF	(Brazil) Pedro Vilhena	(Brazil) Ponte Preta	End of loan	
14 April 2025	DF	(Brazil) Belém	(Brazil) Chapecoense	End of loan	
15 August 2025	DF	(Italy) Rafael Tolói	Free agent	Free transfer	
19 August 2025	DF	(Brazil) Maílton	(Ukraine) Metalist Kharkiv	€ 0.6 M	
24 September 2025	MF	(Brazil) Matheus Ferreira	(Brazil) Vasco da Gama	R$ 1.5 M	
17 October 2025	FW	(Brazil) Gustavo Santana	(Brazil) Cuiabá	R$ 0.7 M	
20 October 2025	MF	(Brazil) Dudu	(Brazil) Náutico	R$ 0.8 M	

=== Loans in ===
Entry date	Position	Player	From club	Fee	Ref.
9 January 2025	DF	(Argentina) Enzo Díaz	(Argentina) River Plate	None	
9 June 2025	FW	(Argentina) Juan Dinenno	(Brazil) Cruzeiro	None	
18 July 2025	FW	(Chile) Gonzalo Tapia	(Argentina) River Plate	R$ 0.6 M	
2 September 2025	FW	(Argentina) Emiliano Rigoni	(Mexico) León	None	
24 October 2025	MF	(Brazil) Anthonny	(Brazil) Ibrachina	None	

=== Transfers out ===
Entry date	Position	Player	To club	Fee	Ref.
4 December 2024	DF	(Brazil) Welington	(England) Southampton	End of contract	
20 December 2024	DF	(Brazil) Rafinha	(Brazil) Coritiba	End of contract	
31 December 2024	MF	(Brazil) Nikão	(China) Guangdong GZ-Power	End of contract	
31 December 2024	MF	(Brazil) Léo Silva	(Brazil) Paraná	End of contract	
1 January 2025	DF	(Northern Ireland) Jamal Lewis	(England) Newcastle United	End of loan	
2 January 2025	MF	(Brazil) Wellington Rato	(Brazil) Vitória	R$ 5.0 M	
4 January 2025	FW	(Brazil) Caio Matheus	(Brazil) Coritiba	Free transfer	
6 January 2025	MF	(Uruguay) Michel Araújo	(Brazil) Bahia	R$ 17.3 M	
6 January 2025	DF	(Brazil) Raí Ramos	(Brazil) Atlético Goianiense	Contract terminated by mutual consent	
8 January 2025	MF	(Ecuador) Jhegson Méndez	(Ecuador) Independiente del Valle	Contract terminated by mutual consent	
22 January 2025	DF	(Brazil) Kauê	(Portugal) Mafra	Undisclosed	
27 January 2025	FW	(Brazil) William Gomes	(Portugal) Porto	R$ 55.6 M	
31 January 2025	MF	(Brazil) Luiz Henrique	(Spain) Real Murcia	Free transfer	
8 February 2025	FW	(Brazil) João Gabriel	Unattached	End of contract	
8 February 2025	MF	(Brazil) Bernardo	(Uruguay) Peñarol	End of contract	
10 February 2025	MF	(Argentina) Santiago Longo	(Argentina) Belgrano	End of loan	
17 February 2025	DF	(Brazil) Ythallo	(Canada) Toronto FC II	Contract terminated by mutual consent	
28 February 2025	FW	(Haiti) Ganaël Gay	(Brazil) Figueirense	Contract terminated by mutual consent	
1 March 2025	DF	(Colombia) Luis Manuel Orejuela	Unattached	End of contract	
4 April 2025	MF	(Brazil) Samuel Santos	(Brazil) Laranja Mecânica	End of loan	
28 April 2025	GK	(Brazil) Arthur Doria	(Brazil) SSA FC	End of contract	
2 June 2025	MF	(Brazil) Gabriel Falcão	Unattached	End of contract	
18 June 2025	DF	(Brazil) Brian	Unattached	End of contract	
22 June 2025	DF	(Brazil) Igor Vinícius	(Brazil) Santos	Free transfer	
24 June 2025	DF	(Brazil) Ruan Tressoldi	(Italy) Sassuolo	End of loan	
30 June 2025	MF	(Brazil) Liziero	(Portugal) Nacional	End of contract	
10 July 2025	MF	(Brazil) Matheus Alves	(Russia) CSKA Moscow	R$ 38.7 M	
18 July 2025	MF	(Brazil) Mateus Amaral	(Ukraine) Oleksandriya	Undisclosed	
21 July 2025	FW	(Peru) Arnold Cotito	(Peru) Sporting Cristal	End of loan	
22 July 2025	FW	(Ghana) King Faisal	(Greece) AEL	Contract terminated by mutual consent	
15 August 2025	DF	(Brazil) Lucas Inácio	(Brazil) Tupi	Free transfer	
16 August 2025	MF	(Brazil) Lucas Ferreira	(Ukraine) Shakhtar	R$ 50.0 M	
28 August 2025	GK	(Brazil) Eric	(Brazil) Sfera FC	End of contract	
28 August 2025	FW	(Brazil) Mateus Manso	(Gibraltar) Magpies	End of contract	
30 August 2025	DF	(Brazil) Lucas Loss	(Denmark) Midtjylland	R$ 2.0 M	
1 September 2025	MF	(Brazil) Pedro Vilhena	(Brazil) Operário Ferroviário	Contract terminated by mutual consent	
2 September 2025	MF	(Brazil) Enzo Perroni	Unattached	End of contract	
5 September 2025	MF	(Brazil) Caique Takada	Unattached	Contract terminated by mutual consent	
9 September 2025	FW	(Brazil) Henrique Carmo	(Russia) CSKA Moscow	R$ 38.7 M	
7 November 2025	MF	(Brazil) Rodrigo Nestor	(Brazil) Bahia	R$ 23.7 M	

=== Loans out ===
Entry date	Position	Player	To club	Fee	Ref.
6 December 2024	DF	(Brazil) Belém	(Brazil) Chapecoense	None	
17 December 2024	MF	(Brazil) Pedro Vilhena	(Brazil) Ponte Preta	None	
24 December 2024	MF	(Brazil) Rodrigo Nestor	(Brazil) Bahia	R$ 9.4 M	
3 January 2025	MF	(Argentina) Giuliano Galoppo	(Argentina) River Plate	None	
29 January 2025	DF	(Brazil) João Moreira	(Portugal) Porto B	None	
31 January 2025	MF	(Brazil) Gabriel Falcão	(Brazil) Pouso Alegre	None	
1 February 2025	DF	(Brazil) Brian	(Spain) Real Murcia	None	
26 February 2025	MF	(Senegal) Iba Ly	(Brazil) Retrô	None	
28 February 2025	MF	(Brazil) Cauã Lucca	(Brazil) Boavista	None	
28 February 2025	FW	(Brazil) Mateus Manso	(Brazil) Boavista	None	
25 March 2025	FW	(Brazil) Erick	(Brazil) Vitória	Undisclosed	
9 August 2025	GK	(Brazil) Jandrei	(Brazil) Juventude	None	
21 August 2025	DF	(Brazil) Raphael Gogoni	(Brazil) Boston City Brasil	None	

== Competitions ==
=== Overview ===
Competition	First match	Last match	Starting round	Final position	Record							
Competition	First match	Last match	Starting round	Final position	Pld	W	D	L	GF	GA	GD	Win %
Série A	29 March 2025	7 December 2025	Matchday 1	8th	38	14	9	15	43	47	−4	36.84
Campeonato Paulista	20 January 2025	10 March 2025	First stage	Semi-final	14	6	4	4	19	14	+5	42.86
Copa do Brasil	29 April 2025	6 August 2025	Third round	Round of 16	4	3	0	1	6	4	+2	75.00
Copa Libertadores	2 April 2025	25 September 2025	Group stage	Quarter-finals	10	4	4	2	11	8	+3	40.00
Total					66	27	17	22	79	73	+6	40.91

Source: Competitions

=== FC Series ===
São Paulo FC held the pre-season in Florida, United States, like other Brazilian teams (Atlético Mineiro, Cruzeiro and Flamengo), facing the latter two in the following matches:

15 January 2025	Cruzeiro	1–1	São Paulo	Orlando
19:30 (UTC−5)	Matheus Pereira 1'; João Marcelo (yellow card) 3'; William (yellow card) 43'; Peralta (yellow card) 70'	Report	Luciano 45+1'; Oscar (yellow card) 66'	Stadium: Inter&Co Stadium; Referee: Tori Penso (United States)

19 January 2025	São Paulo	0–0	Flamengo	Fort Lauderdale
15:00 (UTC−5)	Alisson (yellow card) 45'	Report	de la Cruz (yellow card) 6'; Gerson (yellow card) 37'	Stadium: Chase Stadium; Referee: Alexis da Silva (United States)

=== Campeonato Paulista ===
Pos	Team	Pld	W	D	L	GF	GA	GD	Pts	Qualification
1	São Paulo	12	5	4	3	18	13	+5	19	Knockout stage
2	Novorizontino	12	4	6	2	13	11	+2	18	Knockout stage
3	Noroeste	12	1	5	6	12	19	−7	8	
4	Água Santa (R)	12	1	4	7	10	23	−13	7	Relegation to Série A2

Source: Soccerway
(R) Relegated

==== Matches ====
20 January 2025 2	Botafogo–SP	0–0	São Paulo	Ribeirão Preto
20:00 (UTC−3)	Toró (yellow card) 44'; Pablo Thomaz (yellow card) 73'; Abdulai (yellow card) 90+1'	Report	Moreira (yellow card) 11'; Ferraresi (yellow card) 21'	Stadium: Estádio Santa Cruz; Attendance: 13,090; Referee: João Vitor Gobi

23 January 2025 3	São Paulo	1–0	Guarani	São Paulo
19:30 (UTC−3)	Luciano 4'	Report	Titi (red card) 77'	Stadium: Morumbi; Attendance: 28,360; Referee: Luiz Flávio de Oliveira

26 January 2025 4	São Paulo	3–1	Corinthians	São Paulo
19:30 (UTC−3)	Lucas Moura 49', 63'; Oscar 56'; Jandrei (yellow card) 71'; Luciano (yellow card) 76'; Alan Franco (yellow card) 87'	Report	Alex Santana (yellow card) 1'; Coronado (yellow card) 28'; José Martínez 62', (yellow card) 89'	Stadium: Morumbi; Attendance: 54,855; Referee: Flávio Rodrigues de Souza

29 January 2025 5	Portuguesa	1–2	São Paulo	São Paulo
21:35 (UTC−3)	Renan Peixoto 14'; Alex Silva (yellow card) 74'; Tauã (yellow card) 90+1'; Fernando Henrique (yellow card) 90+4'	Report	André Silva 26' (pen.); Santiago Longo (yellow card) 56'; Patryck Lanza (yellow card) 80'; Ruan Tressoldi (yellow card) 85'; Ryan Francisco 90+2'	Stadium: Pacaembu; Attendance: 8,399; Referee: Matheus Delgado Candançan

1 February 2025 6	Santos	3–1	São Paulo	Santos
21:15 (UTC−3)	Rincón (yellow card) 25'; Tiquinho Soares (yellow card) 41'; Guilherme 42', 71'; Gabriel Bontempo 52'; Zé Ivaldo (yellow card) 87'; Léo Godoy (yellow card) 87'	Report	Lucas Moura 35'; Sabino (yellow card) 79'; André Silva (yellow card) 87'; Ferreira (yellow card) 87'	Stadium: Vila Belmiro; Attendance: 14,268; Referee: Luiz Flávio de Oliveira

5 February 2025 7	São Paulo	4–1	Mirassol	São Paulo
19:30 (UTC−3)	Oscar 10'; Igor Vinícius (yellow card) 21'; Calleri 45+6'; Luciano (yellow card) 67'; Rafael (yellow card) 81'; Enzo Díaz 85'; André Silva 90+1'; Sabino (yellow card) 90+3'	Report	Gabriel 25'; João Victor (yellow card) 49'	Stadium: Morumbi; Attendance: 24,034; Referee: João Vitor Gobi

8 February 2025 8	Red Bull Bragantino	1–0	São Paulo	Bragança Paulista
18:30 (UTC−3)	Juninho Capixaba (yellow card) 31' (yellow-red card) 45+5'; Matheus Fernandes 34'; Gabriel (yellow card) 73'	Report	Calleri (yellow card) 71'; Luciano (yellow card) 81'	Stadium: Estádio Nabi Abi Chedid; Attendance: 8,351; Referee: Edina Alves Batista

10 February 2025 1	São Paulo	0–0	Internacional de Limeira	Brasília
21:30 (UTC−3)	Pablo Maia (yellow card) 73'	Report	Marlon (yellow card) 40'; Juan Tavares (red card) 45+2'; Bernardo Lemes (yellow card) 61'; Carlão (yellow card) 67'	Stadium: Mané Garrincha; Attendance: 10,060; Referee: Fabiano Monteiro dos Santos
Note: The match originally scheduled for Estádio do Morumbi was rescheduled to Brasília, due to the Shakira tour in Brazil.

13 February 2025 9	São Paulo	3–3	Velo Clube	Brasília
21:30 (UTC−3)	Enzo Díaz (yellow card) 15'; Luciano 25', 44'; André Silva 81'	Report	Sillas 34'; Daniel Amorim 74'; Rafael Ribeiro (yellow card) 75'; Jefferson Nem 90+2'	Stadium: Mané Garrincha; Attendance: 9,803; Referee: Marianna Nanni Batalha
Note: The match originally scheduled for Estádio do Morumbi was rescheduled to Brasília, due to the Shakira tour in Brazil.

16 February 2025 10	Palmeiras	0–0	São Paulo	São Paulo
18:30 (UTC−3)		Report	Enzo Díaz (yellow card) 22'; Alisson (yellow card) 28'; Rafael (yellow card) 90+1'; Calleri (yellow card) 90+3'	Stadium: Allianz Parque; Attendance: 37,985; Referee: Flávio Rodrigues de Souza

19 February 2025 11	São Paulo	1–2	Ponte Preta	São Paulo
19:30 (UTC−3)	Calleri 45'; André Silva (yellow card) 53'; Cédric Soares (yellow card) 90+1'	Report	Danilo Barcelos (yellow card) 22'; Jean Dias (yellow card) 24'; Artur 49'; Emerson Santos (yellow card) 55'; Éverton Brito 60'; Gustavo Lopes (yellow card) 90+6'	Stadium: Morumbi; Attendance: 22,138; Referee: Daiane Muniz

23 February 2025 12	São Bernardo	1–3	São Paulo	São Bernardo do Campo
18:30 (UTC−3)	Augusto (yellow card) 16'; Fabrício Daniel 57' (pen.)	Report	André Silva 20', 32'; Lucas Moura (yellow card) 27'; Bobadilla (yellow card) 60'; Arboleda 90+3'	Stadium: Estádio 1º de Maio; Attendance: 3,241; Referee: Marianna Nanni Batalha

==== Quarter-final ====
3 March 2025 Single match	São Paulo	1–0	Novorizontino	São Paulo
20:00 (UTC−3)	Calleri 63'	Report	Patrick (yellow card) 35'; Patrick Brey (red card) 90+2'; Rafael Donato (yellow card) 90+4'; Robson (yellow card) 90+7'	Stadium: Morumbi; Attendance: 52,315; Referee: Edina Alves Batista

==== Semi-final ====
10 March 2025 Single match	Palmeiras	1–0	São Paulo	São Paulo
21:35 (UTC−3)	Raphael Veiga 45+2' (pen.); Emiliano Martínez (yellow card) 50'; Estêvão (yellow card) 54'; Micael (yellow card) 69'	Report	Alan Franco (yellow card) 60'; Ferraresi (yellow card) 65'; Sabino (yellow card) 80'	Stadium: Allianz Parque; Attendance: 38,865; Referee: Flávio Rodrigues de Souza

=== Copa Libertadores ===
==== Group stage ====
The draw for the group stage was held on 17 March 2025, 20:00 PYST (UTC−3), at the CONMEBOL Convention Centre in Luque, Paraguay.

Pos	Team	Pld	W	D	L	GF	GA	GD	Pts	Qualification	SPA	LIB	ALI	TAL
1	(Brazil) São Paulo	6	4	2	0	10	4	+6	14	Advance to round of 16	—	1–1	2–2	2–1
2	(Paraguay) Libertad	6	2	3	1	6	5	+1	9	Advance to round of 16	0–2	—	2–2	2–0
3	(Peru) Alianza Lima	6	1	2	3	7	11	−4	5	Transfer to Copa Sudamericana	0–2	0–1	—	3–2
4	(Argentina) Talleres	6	1	1	4	5	8	−3	4		0–1	0–0	2–0	—

Source: CONMEBOL
Rules for classification: 1) Points; 2) Goal difference; 3) Goals scored; 4) Away goals scored; 5) CONMEBOL ranking.

2 April 2025 1	Talleres (Argentina)	0–1	(Brazil) São Paulo	Córdoba, Argentina
21:30 UTC−3	Depietri (yellow card) 27'; Santiago Fernández (yellow card) 82'; Portilla (yellow card) 89'	Report	Arboleda (yellow card) 70'; Alisson 76', (yellow card) 79'; Cédric Soares (yellow card) 89'	Stadium: Estadio Mario Alberto Kempes; Attendance: 28,991; Referee: Felipe González (Chile)

10 April 2025 2	São Paulo (Brazil)	2–2	(Peru) Alianza Lima	São Paulo, Brazil
21:30 UTC−3	Marcos Antônio (yellow card) 22'; Ferreira 32', 37'	Report	Noriega (yellow card) 45+2'; Castillo 66'; Quevedo 76'; Velásquez (yellow card) 90+1'	Stadium: Morumbi; Attendance: 49,938; Referee: Alexis Herrera (Venezuela)

23 April 2025 3	Libertad (Paraguay)	0–2	(Brazil) São Paulo	Asunción, Paraguay
21:30 UTC−3	Melgarejo (yellow card) 37', (penalty missed) 70'; Caballero (yellow card) 90+1'	Report	Marcos Antônio (yellow card) 49'; Lucas Ferreira 62'; André Silva (yellow card) 69', (goal) 83'	Stadium: Estadio Tigo La Huerta; Attendance: 4,718; Referee: Cristian Garay (Chile)

6 May 2025 4	Alianza Lima (Peru)	0–2	(Brazil) São Paulo	Lima, Peru
19:00 UTC−3	Garcés (red card) 69'; Castillo (yellow card) 78'; Trauco (yellow card) 90+4'	Report	André Silva 35', 89'; Alan Franco (yellow card) 81'; Ferraresi (yellow card) 90+4'	Stadium: Estadio Alejandro Villanueva; Attendance: 25,208; Referee: Andrés Matonte (Uruguay)

14 May 2025 5	São Paulo (Brazil)	1–1	(Paraguay) Libertad	São Paulo, Brazil
21:30 UTC−3	Alisson (red card) 16'; Lucca Marques 90', (yellow card) 90+2'	Report	Caballero (yellow card) 39'; Sanabria (yellow card) 45+2'; Aguilar 74'	Stadium: Morumbi; Attendance: 46,996; Referee: Carlos Betancur (Colombia)

27 May 2025 6	São Paulo (Brazil)	2–1	(Argentina) Talleres	São Paulo, Brazil
19:00 UTC−3	Sabino (yellow card) 6', (goal) 26'; Luciano 84', (yellow card) 90+9'	Report	Navarro (yellow card) 25'; Girotti 39', (yellow card) 49'; Portillo (yellow card) 90+9'	Stadium: Morumbi; Attendance: 35,102; Referee: Piero Maza (Chile)

==== Round of 16 ====
The draw for the round of 16 was held in 2 June, 12:00 PYST (UTC−3), at the CONMEBOL Convention Centre in Luque, Paraguay.

12 August 2025 First leg	Atlético Nacional (Colombia)	0–0	(Brazil) São Paulo	Medellín, Colombia
21:30 UTC−3	Cardona (penalty missed) 14', 68'; Román (yellow card) 71'; Morelos (yellow card) 90+5'	Report	Ferraresi (yellow card) 35'; Alisson (yellow card) 42'	Stadium: Estadio Atanasio Girardot; Attendance: 40,048; Referee: Gustavo Tejera (Uruguay)

19 August 2025 Second leg	São Paulo (Brazil)	1–1 (1–1 agg.) (4–3 p)	(Colombia) Atlético Nacional	São Paulo, Brazil
21:30 UTC−3	André Silva 3'; Cédric Soares (yellow card) 18'; Ferraresi (yellow card) 70'; Alan Franco (yellow card) 78'	Report	Cardona (yellow card) 18' (yellow-red card) 70'; Zapata (yellow card) 50'; Morelos 70' (pen.); Campuzano (yellow card) 90+7'; Román (yellow card) 90+8'	Stadium: Morumbi; Attendance: 57,559; Referee: Maximiliano Ramírez (Argentina)
	Penalties
	Lucas Moura (penalty scored); Marcos Antônio (penalty missed); Luciano (penalty scored); Enzo Díaz (penalty scored); Cédric Soares (penalty scored)		(penalty missed) Uribe; (penalty scored) Campuzano; (penalty scored) Morelos; (penalty scored) Tesillo; (penalty missed) Hinestroza

==== Quarter-finals ====
18 September 2025 First leg	LDU Quito (Ecuador)	2–0	(Brazil) São Paulo	Quito, Ecuador
19:00 UTC−3	Ramírez 15'; Quiñónez (yellow card) 72'; Estrada 78'; Villamíl (yellow card) 88'	Report	Arboleda (yellow card) 27'	Stadium: Estadio Rodrigo Paz Delgado; Referee: Yael Falcón Pérez (Argentina)

25 September 2025 Second leg	São Paulo (Brazil)	0–1 (0–3 agg.)	(Ecuador) LDU Quito	São Paulo, Brazil
19:00 UTC−3	Arboleda (yellow card) 90+5'	Report	Cornejo (yellow card) 14'; Quintero (yellow card) 36'; Medina 41'	Stadium: Morumbi; Attendance: 54,609; Referee: Alexis Herrera (Venezuela)

=== Série A ===
==== League table ====
Pos	Team	Pld	W	D	L	GF	GA	GD	Pts	Qualification or relegation
6	Botafogo	38	17	12	9	58	38	+20	63	Qualification for Copa Libertadores second stage
7	Bahia	38	17	9	12	50	47	+3	60	Qualification for Copa Libertadores second stage
8	São Paulo	38	14	9	15	43	47	−4	51	Qualification for Copa Sudamericana group stage
9	Grêmio	38	13	10	15	47	50	−3	49	Qualification for Copa Sudamericana group stage
10	Red Bull Bragantino	38	14	6	18	45	57	−12	48	Qualification for Copa Sudamericana group stage

Source: CBF
Rules for classification: 1) points; 2) wins; 3) goal difference; 4) goals scored; 5) head-to-head results (only between two teams); 6) fewest red cards; 7) fewest yellow cards; 8) drawing of lots.

==== Results summary ====
Overall								Home						Away					
Pld	W	D	L	GF	GA	GD	Pts	W	D	L	GF	GA	GD	W	D	L	GF	GA	GD
38	14	9	15	43	47	−4	51	10	4	5	27	17	+10	4	5	10	16	30	−14

==== Results by round ====
Round	1	2	3	4	5	6	7	8	9	10	11	12	13	14	15	16	17	18	19	20	21	22	23	24	25	26	27	28	29	30	31	32	33	34	35	36	37	38
Ground	H	A	H	A	H	A	H	A	H	H	A	H	A	A	H	A	H	A	H	A	H	A	H	A	H	A	H	A	A	H	A	H	H	A	H	A	H	A
Result	D	D	D	D	W	D	D	L	W	L	L	L	L	D	W	W	W	W	W	D	W	L	W	L	L	W	L	L	L	W	W	D	L	L	W	L	W	L
Position	12	14	15	16	10	10	11	16	11	13	13	14	15	16	14	12	8	8	7	7	7	7	7	7	7	7	8	8	9	9	8	8	8	9	8	8	8	8

Postponed

Source: CBF.com

==== Matches ====
The league fixtures was announced on 12 February 2025.

29 March 2025 1	São Paulo	0–0	Sport	São Paulo
18:30 UTC−3	Calleri (penalty missed) 3'	Report	Lucas Lima (yellow card) 59'; Matheus Alexandre (yellow card) 90+3'	Stadium: Morumbi; Attendance: 37,856; Referee: Felipe Fernandes de Lima

6 April 2025 2	Atlético Mineiro	0–0	São Paulo	Belo Horizonte
16:00 UTC−3	Lyanco (yellow card) 34' (yellow-red card) 90+9'	Report	Ferreira (yellow card) 34'; André Silva (yellow card) 49'; Calleri (red card) 84'; Alan Franco (yellow card) 90+1'	Stadium: Mineirão; Attendance: 28,415; Referee: Ramon Abatti Abel

13 April 2025 3	São Paulo	1–1	Cruzeiro	São Paulo
17:30 UTC−3	Alisson (yellow card) 27'; Ferreira 52'; Enzo Díaz (yellow card) 57'; André Silva (yellow card) 61'; Marcos Antônio (yellow card) 78'; Matheus Alves (yellow card) 90+5'	Report	Kaiki Bruno (yellow card) 27'; Kaio Jorge (yellow card) 51', (goal) 65'; Matheus Pereira (yellow card) 73'; Lucas Romero (yellow card) 81'; Fagner (yellow card) 84'; Fabrício Bruno (yellow card) 90+4'	Stadium: Morumbi; Attendance: 37,566; Referee: Rodrigo José Pereira de Lima

16 April 2025 4	Botafogo	2–2	São Paulo	Rio de Janeiro
18:30 UTC−3	Savarino 24'; Igor Jesus 84'	Report	Ferreira 21', (yellow card) 66'; André Silva 45+13'; Matheus Alves (yellow card) 53'; Arboleda (yellow card) 90+1'; Rodriguinho (yellow card) 90+2'; Enzo Díaz (yellow card) 57'	Stadium: Estádio Nilton Santos; Attendance: 12,014; Referee: Davi de Oliveira Lacerda

20 April 2025 5	São Paulo	2–1	Santos	São Paulo
16:00 UTC−3	Ferreira 10', (yellow card) 66'; André Silva 23'; Sabino (yellow card) 41'; Marcos Antônio (yellow card) 45+5'; Rafael (yellow card) 57'; Alisson (yellow card) 63'; Matheus Alves (yellow card) 75'; Rodriguinho (yellow card) 90+2'; Enzo Díaz (yellow card) 90+5'	Report	Rollheiser (yellow card) 31'; Tiquinho Soares 45+3' (pen.), (yellow card) 48'; Gil (yellow card) 90+8'	Stadium: Morumbi; Attendance: 52,436; Referee: Wilton Pereira Sampaio

26 April 2025 6	Ceará	1–1	São Paulo	Fortaleza
18:30 UTC−3	Pedro Henrique 4', (yellow card) 53'; Willian Machado (yellow card) 46'	Report	Enzo Díaz (yellow card) 31'; Ryan Francisco 44'; Igor Vinícius (yellow card) 67'; Marcos Antônio (yellow card) 76'; Cédric Soares (yellow card) 84'; Bobadilla (yellow card) 88'	Stadium: Arena Castelão; Attendance: 46,929; Referee: Anderson Daronco

2 May 2025 7	São Paulo	0–0	Fortaleza	São Paulo
21:30 UTC−3	Lucas Ferreira (yellow card) 43'; Ferreira (penalty missed) 64'; Bobadilla (yellow card) 90+6'	Report	João Ricardo (yellow card) 61'; Gustavo Mancha (yellow card) 73'	Stadium: Morumbi; Attendance: 39,502; Referee: Wagner do Nascimento Magalhães

11 May 2025 8	Palmeiras	1–0	São Paulo	Barueri
17:30 UTC−3	Piquerez (yellow card) 85'; Vitor Roque 90+5'	Report	Ruan (yellow card) 31'; Ferraresi (yellow card) 90+4'	Stadium: Arena Barueri; Attendance: 29,709; Referee: Rafael Rodrigo Klein

17 May 2025 9	São Paulo	2–1	Grêmio	São Paulo
21:00 UTC−3	Pablo Maia (yellow card) 30'; Luciano (yellow card) 45+7'; Arboleda 49'; André Silva 85' (pen.); Oscar (yellow card) 86'; Rafael (yellow card) 90+8'	Report	Villasanti (yellow card) 4'; Aravena 37'; Jemerson (yellow card) 64'; Dodi (yellow card) 65'; Volpi (yellow card) 79'	Stadium: Morumbi; Attendance: 34,579; Referee: Rodrigo José Pereira de Lima

24 May 2025 10	São Paulo	0–2	Mirassol	São Paulo
18:30 UTC−3	Pablo Maia (yellow card) 22'; Ferraresi (yellow card) 50'; Alisson (yellow card) 58'; André Silva (yellow card) 68'	Report	Neto Moura (yellow card) 12'; Gabriel 53'; Reinaldo 89' (pen.)	Stadium: Morumbi; Attendance: 30,925; Referee: Alex Gomes Stefano

31 May 2025 11	Bahia	2–1	São Paulo	Salvador
18:30 UTC−3	Willian José 53', 73' (pen.); Kayky (yellow card) 87'	Report	Luciano (yellow card) 59', (goal) 85' (pen.); Rodriguinho (yellow card) 90+8'	Stadium: Arena Fonte Nova; Attendance: 41,041; Referee: Anderson Daronco

12 June 2025 12	São Paulo	1–3	Vasco	São Paulo
21:30 UTC−3	Luciano (yellow card) 33'; Arboleda (yellow card) 38'; André Silva (yellow card) 45'; Juan Dinenno (yellow card) 87'; Ryan Francisco 90+3'	Report	Rayan 26'; Nuno Moreira 40'; João Victor (yellow card) 60'; Vegetti 69'; Hugo Moura (yellow card) 71'	Stadium: Morumbi; Attendance: 20,332; Referee: Rafael Rodrigo Klein

12 July 2025 13	Flamengo	2–0	São Paulo	Rio de Janeiro
16:30 UTC−3	Bruno Henrique (yellow card) 41'; Luiz Araújo 61'; Wallace Yan 90+6', (yellow card) 90+7'	Report	Sabino (yellow card) 26'; Alan Franco (yellow card) 34'	Stadium: Maracanã; Attendance: 67,359; Referee: Wilton Pereira Sampaio

16 July 2025 14	Red Bull Bragantino	2–2	São Paulo	Bragança Paulista
21:30 UTC−3	Guzmán Rodríguez 43'; Hurtado 48'; Guilherme (yellow card) 57'; Sasha (yellow card) 63'; Gabriel (yellow card) 82'	Report	André Silva 9', 64'	Stadium: Estádio Cícero de Souza Marques; Attendance: 6,014; Referee: Alex Gomes Stefano

19 July 2025 15	São Paulo	2–0	Corinthians	São Paulo
21:00 UTC−3	Luciano 32', 35'; Alisson (yellow card) 37'; Tapia (yellow card) 90+1'	Report	Raniele (yellow card) 53'; Garro (yellow card) 83'	Stadium: Morumbi; Attendance: 47,964; Referee: Anderson Daronco

24 July 2025 16	Juventude	0–1	São Paulo	Caxias do Sul
19:00 UTC−3	Marcos Paulo (yellow card) 27'; Gilberto (yellow card) 31'; Caíque (yellow card) 90+6'	Report	André Silva (yellow card) 28'; Luciano 85', (yellow card) 90+4'	Stadium: Estádio Alfredo Jaconi; Attendance: 6,095; Referee: Sávio Pereira Sampaio

27 July 2025 17	São Paulo	3–1	Fluminense	São Paulo
16:00 UTC−3	Arboleda 24'; Luciano (penalty missed) 42'; Ferreira (yellow card) 54' (goal) 59'; Enzo Díaz (yellow card) 63'; Alan Franco (yellow card) 86'; Tapia 90+1'	Report	Martinelli (yellow card) 40'; Lima (yellow card) 45+2'; Bernal (yellow card) 56'; Xavier 77'; Freytes (yellow card) 89'	Stadium: Morumbi; Attendance: 42,628; Referee: Davi de Oliveira Lacerda

3 August 2025 18	Internacional	1–2	São Paulo	Porto Alegre
20:30 UTC−3	Valencia (yellow card) 45'; Borré (yellow card) 53'; Bruno Tabata 89' (pen.)	Report	Arboleda 43'; Luciano (yellow card) 45'; Tapia (yellow card) 70'; Bobadilla 76'	Stadium: Estádio Beira-Rio; Attendance: 11,414; Referee: Alex Gomes Stefano

9 August 2025 19	São Paulo	2–0	Vitória	São Paulo
18:30 UTC−3	Bobadilla 20'; Enzo Díaz (yellow card) 44'; Maik (yellow card) 60'; Alan Franco (yellow card) 65'; Sabino 86'	Report	Zé Marcos (yellow card) 32'; Ronald (yellow card) 42'; Ramon (yellow card) 63'	Stadium: Morumbi; Attendance: 39,283; Referee: Bruno Arleu de Araújo

16 August 2025 20	Sport	2–2	São Paulo	Recife
18:30 UTC−3	Lucas Lima 5', (yellow card) 90+1'; Rivera (yellow card) 44'; Derik Lacerda 50', (yellow card) 51'; Kevyson (yellow card) 81'	Report	Maik (yellow card) 58', (goal) 90+1'; Lucas Moura 66'	Stadium: Ilha do Retiro; Attendance: 26,104; Referee: Lucas Paulo Torezin

24 August 2025 21	São Paulo	2–0	Atlético Mineiro	São Paulo
20:30 UTC−3	Pablo Maia 23'; Enzo Días (yellow card) 45+1'; Tapia 81'	Report	Everson (yellow card) 37'; Igor Gomes (yellow card) 60'	Stadium: Morumbi; Attendance: 26,364; Referee: Lucas Casagrande

30 August 2025 22	Cruzeiro	1–0	São Paulo	Belo Horizonte
21:00 UTC−3	Villalba (yellow card) 28'; Matheus Pereira 64'; Lucas Silva (yellow card) 87'	Report	Luciano (yellow card) 23'; Rodriguinho (yellow card) 61'; Patryck Lanza (yellow card) 70'; Bobadilla (yellow card) 88'	Stadium: Mineirão; Attendance: 36,882; Referee: Anderson Daronco

14 September 2025 23	São Paulo	1–0	Botafogo	São Paulo
17:30 UTC−3	Dinenno 7'; Alan Franco (yellow card) 48'; Marcos Antônio (yellow card) 87'; Tapia (yellow card) 90+2'	Report	David Ricardo (yellow card) 87'	Stadium: Morumbi; Attendance: 38,713; Referee: Wilton Pereira Sampaio

21 September 2025 24	Santos	1–0	São Paulo	Santos
20:30 UTC−3	Frías (yellow card) 48'; Guilherme 60'; Escobar (yellow card) 80'; Brazão (yellow card) 90+9'	Report	Rodriguinho (yellow card) 45+4'; Luciano (yellow card) 90'; Rigoni (yellow card) 90+8'	Stadium: Vila Belmiro; Attendance: 12,107; Referee: Rodrigo José Pereira de Lima

29 September 2025 25	São Paulo	0–1	Ceará	São Paulo
20:00 UTC−3	Arboleda (yellow card) 82'; Dinenno (yellow card) 90+4'	Report	Diego (yellow card) 37'; Lourenço (yellow card) 52'; Pedro Henrique 56'; Guilherme Luiz (yellow card) 87'	Stadium: Morumbi; Attendance: 12,342; Referee: Bruno Arleu de Araújo

2 October 2025 26	Fortaleza	0–2	São Paulo	Fortaleza
19:30 UTC−3	Ávila (yellow card) 45+4'; Gazal (yellow card) 59'; Pochettino (yellow card) 87'	Report	Tapia 11'; Rigoni (red card) 22'; Luciano 85'	Stadium: Arena Castelão; Attendance: 35,544; Referee: Anderson Daronco

5 October 2025 27	São Paulo	2–3	Palmeiras	São Paulo
16:00 UTC−3	Luciano 15'; Bobadilla (yellow card) 22'; Tapia 34'; Pablo Maia (yellow card) 64'; Enzo Díaz (yellow card) 80'	Report	Raphael Veiga (yellow card) 11'; Andreas Pereira (yellow card) 55'; Vitor Roque 70', (yellow card) 80'; José López 74'; Sosa 89'; Aníbal Moreno (yellow card) 90+7'	Stadium: Morumbi; Attendance: 33,864; Referee: Ramon Abatti Abel

16 October 2025 28	Grêmio	2–0	São Paulo	Porto Alegre
19:00 UTC−3	Carlos Vinícius 39', 56' (pen.); Dodi (yellow card) 90+4'	Report	Tapia (yellow card) 21'; Maílton (yellow card) 64'; Luciano (yellow card) 75'	Stadium: Arena do Grêmio; Attendance: 21,526; Referee: Davi De Oliveira Lacerda

19 October 2025 29	Mirassol	3–0	São Paulo	Mirassol
18:30 UTC−3	Alesson 1'; Reinaldo 35' (pen.); Carlos Eduardo (yellow card) 45', (goal) 69'; Neto Moura (yellow card) 87'; Yago Felipe (yellow card) 90+2'	Report	Enzo Díaz (yellow card) 33'; Ferraresi (yellow card) 40'; Arboleda (yellow card) 83'	Stadium: Estádio José Maria de Campos Maia; Attendance: 8,981; Referee: Matheus Delgado Candançan

25 October 2025 30	São Paulo	2–0	Bahia	São Paulo
21:30 UTC−3	Luciano 7', (yellow card) 54'; Maik (yellow card) 27'; Bobadilla 41'	Report	David Duarte (yellow card) 33'; Ademir (yellow card) 36'; Nestor (yellow card) 90'; Santiago Mingo (yellow card) 90+8'	Stadium: Morumbi; Attendance: 15,253; Referee: Lucas Paulo Torezin

2 November 2025 31	Vasco	0–2	São Paulo	Rio de Janeiro
20:30 UTC−3	Paulo Henrique (yellow card) 45+5'; Nuno Moreira (yellow card) 47'	Report	Lucas Moura 45+7' (pen.); Alan Franco (yellow card) 72'; Enzo Díaz (yellow card) 75'; Luiz Gustavo 87'	Stadium: Estádio São Januário; Attendance: 20,359; Referee: Wilton Pereira Sampaio

5 November 2025 32	São Paulo	2–2	Flamengo	Santos
21:30 UTC−3	Luciano 3', (yellow card) 12'; Ferreira 80'; Alisson (yellow card) 90+5'	Report	De Arrascaeta 8' (pen.); Carrascal (yellow card) 40'; Danilo (yellow card) 45+3'; Lino 64'; Plata (red card) 67'; Rossi (yellow card) 90'	Stadium: Vila Belmiro; Attendance: 11,228; Referee: Rodrigo José Pereira de Lima
Note: The match originally scheduled for Estádio do Morumbi was rescheduled to Santos, due to the Imagine Dragons Loom World Tour.

8 November 2025 33	São Paulo	0–1	Red Bull Bragantino	Santos
21:00 UTC−3	Enzo Díaz (yellow card) 72'	Report	Pedro Henrique (yellow card) 44'; Jhon Jhon 75'; Vanderlan (yellow card) 90+7'	Stadium: Vila Belmiro; Attendance: 10,086; Referee: Bruno Arleu de Araújo
Note: The match originally scheduled for Estádio do Morumbi was rescheduled to Santos, due to the Linkin Park From Zero World Tour.

20 November 2025 34	Corinthians	3–1	São Paulo	São Paulo
19:30 UTC−3	Breno Bidon (yellow card) 10'; Yuri Alberto 31' (pen.), 89'; Depay 84'	Report	Cédric Soares (yellow card) 24'; Alisson (yellow card) 51'; Tapia 54'	Stadium: Neo Química Arena; Attendance: 46,154; Referee: Anderson Daronco

23 November 2025 35	São Paulo	2–1	Juventude	Santos
16:00 UTC−3	Bobadilla 7', (yellow card) 90+4'; Sabino (yellow card) 9'; Pablo Maia (yellow card) 27'; Lucca Marques (yellow card) 79'; Rafael (yellow card) 89'; Rigoni 90+4'	Report	Mandaca (yellow card) 21'; Igor Formiga (red card) 86'; Ferraresi 90+6' (o.g.)	Stadium: Vila Belmiro; Attendance: 6,468; Referee: André Luiz Skettino Policarpo Bento
Note: The match originally scheduled for Estádio do Morumbi was rescheduled to Santos, due to the Oasis Live '25 Tour.

27 November 2025 36	Fluminense	6–0	São Paulo	Rio de Janeiro
20:30 UTC−3	Canobbio 9' (pen.), 77', (yellow card) 72'; Martinelli 16'; Nonato 24'; John Kennedy 69'; Serna 87'	Report	Alan Franco (yellow card) 90'	Stadium: Maracanã; Attendance: 30,427; Referee: Lucas Paulo Torezin

3 December 2025 37	São Paulo	3–0	Internacional	Santos
20:00 UTC−3	Sabino 21'; Maik 45+3'; Luciano 48'; Bobadilla (yellow card) 62'	Report	Mercado (yellow card) 66'; Vitão (yellow card) 90+4'	Stadium: Vila Belmiro; Attendance: 7,309; Referee: Bruno Arleu de Araújo
Note: The match originally scheduled for Estádio do Morumbi was rescheduled to Santos, due protests organized by supporters against the current club president, Julio Casares.

7 December 2025 38	Vitória	1–0	São Paulo	Salvador
16:00 UTC−3	Camutanga (yellow card) 20'; Baralhas 68', (yellow card) 70'; Willian Oliveira (yellow card) 86'; Matheuzinho (yellow card) 90+3'; Ronald (yellow card) 90+3'	Report	Ferreira (yellow card) 42'	Stadium: Barradão; Attendance: 29,538; Referee: Wilton Pereira Sampaio

=== Copa do Brasil ===
==== Third round ====
29 April 2025 First leg	São Paulo	2–1	Náutico	São Paulo
21:30 UTC−3	Luciano 21', 46', (yellow card) 51'	Report	Caio Vitor 17'; Auremir (yellow card) 51'; Igor Fernandes (yellow card) 58'	Stadium: Morumbi; Attendance: 29,291; Referee: Sávio Pereira Sampaio

20 May 2025 Second leg	Náutico	1–2 (2–4 agg.)	São Paulo	Recife
21:30 UTC−3	Marco Antônio (red card) 11'; Wellerson (yellow card) 21'; Hélio Borges 83'; Carlinhos (yellow card) 90+1'	Report	Luciano 4'; Ferraresi (red card) 22'; Enzo Díaz (yellow card) 53'; Rodriguinho 75', (yellow card) 76'	Stadium: Estádio dos Aflitos; Attendance: 16,832; Referee: Jonathan Benkenstein Pinheiro

==== Round of 16 ====
31 July 2025 First leg	São Paulo	2–1	Athletico Paranaense	São Paulo
19:30 UTC−3	Wendell (yellow card) 9'; Pablo Maia 31'; Cédric Soares (yellow card) 36'; Ferreira 77'; Rodriguinho (yellow card) 90+4'	Report	Lucas Belezi (yellow card) 12'; Viveros 87'	Stadium: Morumbi; Attendance: 42,042; Referee: Ramon Abatti Abel

6 August 2025 Second leg	Athletico Paranaense	1–0 (2–2 agg.) (3–0 p)	São Paulo	Curitiba
19:30 UTC−3	Viveros (yellow card) 24'; Léo Pelé (yellow card) 59'; Bruno Zapelli (yellow card) 65'; Esquivel 69'	Report	Bobadilla (yellow card) 2'; Rafael (red card) 4'; Arboleda (yellow card) 45+7'; Jandrei (yellow card) 90+2'	Stadium: Ligga Arena; Attendance: 30,501; Referee: Felipe Fernandes de Lima
	Penalties
	Giuliano (penalty scored); Esquivel (penalty scored); Mendoza (penalty scored)		(penalty missed) Sabino; (penalty missed) Tapia; (penalty missed) Jandrei

== Statistics ==
=== Goals scored ===
Rank	Player	BR	CdB	CP	CL	Total
1	Luciano	9	3	3	1	16
2	André Silva	5	0	5	4	14
3	Ferreira	5	1	0	2	8
4	Gonzalo Tapia	5	0	0	0	5
4	Lucas Moura	2	0	3	0	5
6	Damián Bobadilla	4	0	0	0	4
6	Robert Arboleda	3	0	1	0	4
8	Jonathan Calleri	0	0	3	0	3
8	Ryan Francisco	2	0	1	0	3
8	Sabino	2	0	0	1	3
11	Maik	2	0	0	0	2
11	Oscar	0	0	2	0	2
11	Pablo Maia	1	1	0	0	2
14	Alisson	0	0	0	1	1
14	Emiliano Rigoni	1	0	0	0	1
14	Enzo Díaz	0	0	1	0	1
14	Juan Dinenno	1	0	0	0	1
14	Lucas Ferreira	0	0	0	1	1
14	Lucca Marques	0	0	0	1	1
14	Luiz Gustavo	1	0	0	0	1
14	Rodriguinho	0	1	0	0	1
Total		43	6	19	11	79
