= 2024 São Paulo FC season =

São Paulo
2024 season
- Chairman: Julio Casares
- Manager: Dorival Júnior (until 7 January 2024); Thiago Carpini (from 11 January to 18 April 2024); Milton Cruz (caretaker, from 18 to 21 April 2024); Luis Zubeldía (from 22 April 2024)
- Stadium: Morumbi
- Campeonato Brasileiro Série A: 6th
- Campeonato Paulista: Quarter-final
- Copa do Brasil: Quarter-finals
- Copa Libertadores: Quarter-finals
- Supercopa do Brasil: Winners
- Top goalscorer: League: Luciano (11); All: Luciano (18)
Home colors	Away colors	Home (alt) colors

The 2024 season was São Paulo's 95th season in the club's history and their 64th in the top-flight of Brazilian football. Along with Série A, São Paulo competed in the Campeonato Paulista, Copa do Brasil, Copa Libertadores and Supercopa do Brasil.

== First-team squad ==
As of 2 September 2024

Note: Flags indicate national team as defined under FIFA eligibility rules; some limited exceptions apply. Players may hold more than one non-FIFA nationality.

No.	Pos.	Nation	Player
2	DF	BRA	Igor Vinícius
3	DF	NIR	Jamal Lewis (on loan from Newcastle United)
4	MF	ARG	Santiago Longo (on loan from Belgrano)
5	DF	ECU	Robert Arboleda
6	DF	BRA	Welington
7	FW	BRA	Lucas Moura
8	MF	ARG	Giuliano Galoppo
9	FW	ARG	Jonathan Calleri (vice-captain)
10	FW	BRA	Luciano
11	MF	BRA	Rodrigo Nestor
13	DF	BRA	Rafinha (captain)
15	MF	URU	Michel Araújo
16	MF	BRA	Luiz Gustavo
17	FW	BRA	André Silva
18	MF	BRA	Rodriguinho
20	MF	BRA	Marcos Antônio (on loan from Lazio)
21	MF	PAR	Damián Bobadilla
22	DF	BRA	Ruan Tressoldi (on loan from Sassuolo)

No.	Pos.	Nation	Player
23	GK	BRA	Rafael
25	MF	BRA	Alisson
26	MF	BRA	Liziero
27	MF	BRA	Wellington Rato
28	DF	ARG	Alan Franco
29	MF	BRA	Pablo Maia
30	DF	BRA	Moreira
32	DF	VEN	Nahuel Ferraresi
33	FW	BRA	Erick
35	DF	BRA	Sabino
36	DF	BRA	Patryck Lanza
37	FW	BRA	Henrique Carmo
39	FW	BRA	William Gomes
44	DF	BRA	Belém
46	MF	BRA	Felipe Negrucci
47	FW	BRA	Ferreira
50	GK	BRA	Young
93	GK	BRA	Jandrei

=== Youth players with first team numbers ===
As of 20 July 2024

Note: Flags indicate national team as defined under FIFA eligibility rules; some limited exceptions apply. Players may hold more than one non-FIFA nationality.

No.	Pos.	Nation	Player
12	GK	BRA	Leandro
14	FW	BRA	Paulinho
19	FW	BRA	Ryan Francisco
20	MF	BRA	Matheus Alves
22	DF	BRA	Igor Felisberto
24	GK	BRA	Felipe Preis
26	DF	BRA	Guilherme Reis

No.	Pos.	Nation	Player
34	DF	BRA	Luis Osorio
38	MF	BRA	Cauã Lucca
40	GK	BRA	João Pedro
42	DF	BRA	Lucas Loss
45	MF	BRA	Lucas Ferreira
48	FW	GHA	King Faisal
49	FW	BRA	João Gabriel

=== Other players under contract ===
Note: Flags indicate national team as defined under FIFA eligibility rules; some limited exceptions apply. Players may hold more than one non-FIFA nationality.

No.	Pos.	Nation	Player
—	GK	BRA	Eric
—	DF	BRA	Brian
—	DF	BRA	Igão
—	DF	COL	Luis Manuel Orejuela
—	DF	BRA	Marques Rickelme
—	MF	BRA	Guilherme Fumaça

No.	Pos.	Nation	Player
—	MF	ECU	Jhegson Méndez
—	MF	BRA	Léo Silva
—	MF	BRA	Luiz Henrique
—	FW	PER	Arnold Cotito
—	FW	BRA	Caio Matheus
—	FW	BRA	Thierry Henry

=== Out on loan ===
Note: Flags indicate national team as defined under FIFA eligibility rules; some limited exceptions apply. Players may hold more than one non-FIFA nationality.

No.	Pos.	Nation	Player
—	GK	BRA	Arthur Doria (at Botafogo-SP until 31 January 2025)
—	GK	BRA	Roberto (at Coritiba until 31 January 2025)
—	DF	BRA	Lucas Inácio (at Botafogo-SP until 31 January 2025)
—	DF	BRA	Raí Ramos (at Ceará until 30 November 2024)
—	DF	BRA	Ythallo (at Toronto FC II until 31 December 2024)
—	MF	BRA	Gabriel Falcão (at Ituano until 31 December 2024)

No.	Pos.	Nation	Player
—	MF	SEN	Iba Ly (at Inter de Limeira until 1 May 2025)
—	MF	BRA	Luan (at Vitória until 31 December 2024)
—	MF	BRA	Mateus Amaral (at Oleksandriya until 30 June 2025)
—	MF	BRA	Nikão (at Athletico Paranaense until 31 December 2024)
—	MF	BRA	Pedro Vilhena (at Sport Recife until 31 December 2024)

=== Retired numbers ===
- 01 – (Brazil) Rogério Ceni, Goalkeeper (1990–2015)

== Transfers ==
=== Transfers in ===
Entry date	Position	Player	From club	Fee	Ref.
10 December 2023	FW	(Brazil) Erick	(Brazil) Ceará	Free transfer	
11 December 2023	MF	(Brazil) Luiz Gustavo	(Saudi Arabia) Al Nassr	Free transfer	
14 December 2023	MF	(Paraguay) Damián Bobadilla	(Paraguay) Cerro Porteño	R$14.7 M	
29 December 2023	MF	(Brazil) Nikão	(Brazil) Cruzeiro	End of loan	
5 January 2024	DF	(Venezuela) Nahuel Ferraresi	(England) Manchester City	R$23.0 M	
9 January 2024	FW	(Brazil) Ferreira	(Brazil) Grêmio	R$12.5 M	
29 February 2024	FW	(Brazil) André Silva	(Portugal) Vitória de Guimarães	R$18.9 M	
15 March 2024	DF	(Brazil) Sabino	(Brazil) Sport Recife	Free transfer	
12 June 2024	MF	(Brazil) Liziero	(Switzerland) Yverdon-Sport	End of loan	
12 June 2024	MF	(Uruguay) Michel Araújo	(Brazil) Fluminense	R$8.0 M	
26 June 2024	MF	(Ecuador) Jhegson Méndez	(Spain) Elche	End of loan	
8 July 2024	MF	(Brazil) Léo Silva	(Brazil) Volta Redonda	End of loan	
10 September 2024	DF	(Colombia) Luis Manuel Orejuela	(Colombia) Independiente Medellín	End of loan	

=== Loans in ===
Entry date	Position	Player	From club	Fee	Ref.
23 July 2024	MF	(Brazil) Marcos Antônio	(Italy) Lazio	R$0.9 M	
25 July 2024	FW	(Peru) Arnold Cotito	(Peru) Sporting Cristal	None	
12 August 2024	DF	(Brazil) Ruan Tressoldi	(Italy) Sassuolo	R$1.2 M	
2 September 2024	MF	(Argentina) Santiago Longo	(Argentina) Belgrano	R$1.7 M	
2 September 2024	DF	(Northern Ireland) Jamal Lewis	(England) Newcastle United	R$0.9 M	

=== Transfers out ===
Entry date	Position	Player	To club	Fee	Ref.
5 December 2023	GK	(Brazil) Felipe Alves	(Brazil) Fortaleza	End of loan	
15 December 2023	FW	(Brazil) David	(Brazil) Internacional	End of loan	
15 December 2023	FW	(Brazil) Alexandre Pato	Unattached	End of contract	
28 December 2023	GK	(Brazil) Thiago Couto	(Brazil) Sport Recife	Undisclosed	
28 December 2023	DF	(Brazil) Caio Paulista	(Brazil) Fluminense	End of loan	
30 December 2023	FW	(Brazil) Erison	(Brazil) Botafogo	End of loan	
31 December 2023	DF	(Brazil) Walce	(Brazil) Santo André	End of contract	
1 January 2024	DF	(Brazil) Lucas Beraldo	(France) Paris Saint-Germain	R$64.2 M	
4 January 2024	DF	(Brazil) Nathan	(Brazil) Red Bull Bragantino	R$5.3 M	
15 January 2024	MF	(Brazil) Talles Costa	(Ukraine) Polissya Zhytomyr	R$5.3 M	
16 January 2024	FW	(Nigeria) Azeez Balogun	(Nigeria) Unique FA	End of loan	
16 January 2024	DF	(Brazil) Guilherme Matheus	(Brazil) Santo André	Free transfer	
16 January 2024	FW	(Portugal) Marcos Paulo	(Spain) Atlético Madrid	End of loan	
31 January 2024	FW	(Brazil) Gabriel Maioli	(Cyprus) APOEL	Undisclosed	
31 January 2024	FW	(Brazil) Talles Wander	(Portugal) AVS	Free transfer	
14 February 2024	MF	(Senegal) Clauvis Etienne	(Brazil) Pouso Alegre	Free transfer	
7 March 2024	DF	(Brazil) Luís Felipe	(Brazil) América Mineiro	End of contract	
26 March 2024	DF	(Brazil) Kaiky Carvalho	(Brazil) Fortaleza	End of contract	
15 July 2024	FW	(Brazil) Gabriel Stevanato	Unattached	End of contract	
15 July 2024	MF	(Uruguay) Gabriel Neves	(Argentina) Estudiantes	R$16.3 M	
16 July 2024	DF	(Brazil) Diego Costa	(Russia) FC Krasnodar	R$44.7 M	
30 July 2024	MF	(Colombia) James Rodríguez	Unattached	Contract terminated by mutual consent	
3 August 2024	DF	(Brazil) João Vitor Miranda	(Spain) Real Valladolid	Free transfer	
13 August 2024	MF	(Brazil) João Pedro Palmberg	(Spain) Real Murcia	Undisclosed	
16 August 2024	FW	(Brazil) Juan	(England) Southampton	R$5.4 M	
25 August 2024	FW	(Brazil) João Adriano	(Brazil) Athletic	Contract terminated by mutual consent	
2 September 2024	MF	(Brazil) Enzo Boer	(Brazil) Santos	End of contract	

=== Loans out ===
Entry date	Position	Player	To club	Fee	Ref.
6 December 2023	MF	(Brazil) Léo Silva	(Brazil) Volta Redonda	None	
13 December 2023	DF	(Brazil) Raí Ramos	(Brazil) Ceará	None	
28 December 2023	MF	(Brazil) Pedro Vilhena	(Brazil) Sport Recife	None	
16 January 2024	MF	(Brazil) Gabriel Falcão	(Brazil) Ituano	None	
20 January 2024	MF	(Uruguay) Gabriel Neves	(Argentina) Independiente	None	
30 January 2024	FW	(Brazil) Gabriel Stevanato	(Brazil) Hercílio Luz	None	
1 February 2024	MF	(Ecuador) Jhegson Méndez	(Spain) Elche	R$2.1 M	
20 February 2024	DF	(Brazil) Ythallo	(Canada) Toronto FC II	None	
6 March 2024	MF	(Brazil) Luan	(Brazil) Vitória	None	
19 April 2024	MF	(Brazil) Nikão	(Brazil) Athletico Paranaense	None	
25 July 2024	MF	(Senegal) Iba Ly	(Brazil) Inter de Limeira	None	
5 September 2024	MF	(Brazil) Mateus Amaral	(Ukraine) Oleksandriya	None	
5 September 2024	DF	(Brazil) Lucas Inácio	(Brazil) Botafogo-SP	None	

== Competitions ==
=== Overview ===
Competition	First match	Last match	Starting round	Final position	Record							
Competition	First match	Last match	Starting round	Final position	Pld	W	D	L	GF	GA	GD	Win %
Série A	13 April 2024	8 December 2024	Matchday 1	6th	38	17	8	13	53	43	+10	44.74
Campeonato Paulista	20 January 2024	17 March 2024	First stage	Quarter-final	13	6	5	2	21	13	+8	46.15
Copa do Brasil	2 May 2024	12 September 2024	Third round	Quarter-finals	6	3	2	1	7	2	+5	50.00
Copa Libertadores	4 April 2024	25 September 2024	Group stage	Quarter-finals	10	5	4	1	13	4	+9	50.00
Supercopa do Brasil	4 February 2024		Final	Winners	1	0	1	0	0	0	+0	0.00
Total					68	31	20	17	94	62	+32	45.59

Source: Competitions

=== Campeonato Paulista ===
Pos	Team	Pld	W	D	L	GF	GA	GD	Pts	Qualification
1	São Paulo	12	6	4	2	20	12	+8	22	Knockout stage
2	Novorizontino	12	6	4	2	16	10	+6	22	Knockout stage
3	São Bernardo	12	6	3	3	14	9	+5	21	
4	Botafogo-SP	12	3	3	6	8	16	−8	12	

Source: Soccerway

==== Matches ====
20 January 2024 1	São Paulo	3–1	Santo André	São Paulo
20:00 (UTC−3)	Lucas Moura 7' (pen.); Luciano 39', (yellow card) 67'; Diego Costa 42'; Alisson (yellow card) 76'	Report	Cléo Silva 21'; Wellington Reis (yellow card) 63'	Stadium: Morumbi; Attendance: 45,270; Referee: Douglas Marques das Flores

23 January 2024 2	Mirassol	1–1	São Paulo	Mirassol
19:30 (UTC−3)	Luiz Otávio 38', (yellow card) 45+1'; Danielzinho (yellow card) 90+4'	Report	Galoppo 45+3' (pen.); Diego Costa (yellow card) 74'	Stadium: Estádio José Maria de Campos Maia; Attendance: 11,612; Referee: Lucas Canetto Bellote

27 January 2024 3	São Paulo	1–0	Portuguesa	São Paulo
18:00 (UTC−3)	Luiz Gustavo 22'; Bobadilla (yellow card) 56'; Galoppo (yellow card) 61'; Welington (yellow card) 64'; Alan Franco (yellow card) 80'	Report	Eduardo (yellow card) 10'; Douglas Borel (yellow card) 43'; Chrigor (yellow card) 73'	Stadium: Morumbi; Attendance: 45,840; Referee: Matheus Delgado Candançan

30 January 2024 4	Corinthians	1–2	São Paulo	São Paulo
19:30 (UTC−3)	Caetano (red card) 43'; Romero (yellow card) 65'; Raul Gustavo (yellow card) 90'; Arthur Sousa 90+1'	Report	Calleri 20', (yellow card) 70'; Alisson (yellow card) 41'; Luiz Gustavo 51'; Welington (yellow card) 77'	Stadium: Neo Química Arena; Attendance: 43,481; Referee: Vinícius Gonçalves Dias Araújo

7 February 2024 6	São Paulo	3–0	Água Santa	São Paulo
21:35 (UTC−3)	Alisson (yellow card) 7'; Bobadilla 10'; Juan 77'; Alan Franco 87'	Report	Gabriel Inocêncio (yellow card) 16'; Bruno Mezenga (penalty missed) 59'	Stadium: Morumbi; Attendance: 36,456; Referee: Raphael Claus

10 February 2024 7	Ponte Preta	2–0	São Paulo	Campinas
18:00 (UTC−3)	Dudu Scheit (yellow card) 68'; Gabriel Risso 75'; Renato 90+2'	Report	Galoppo (yellow card) 31'; Diego Costa (yellow card) 89'; Arboleda (yellow card) 90'	Stadium: Estádio Moisés Lucarelli; Attendance: 11,451; Referee: Fabiano Monteiro dos Santos

14 February 2024 8	São Paulo	0–1	Santos	São Paulo
19:30 (UTC−3)	Calleri (yellow card) 50'; Pablo Maia (yellow card) 78'	Report	Aderlan (yellow card) 43'; Willian (yellow card) 56'; Morelos 66' (pen.), (yellow card) 90+9'; Hayner (yellow card) 79'; Marcelinho (yellow card) 90+8'	Stadium: Morumbi; Attendance: 45,722; Referee: Edina Alves Batista

17 February 2024 9	São Paulo	2–2	Red Bull Bragantino	São Paulo
18:00 (UTC−3)	Pablo Maia (yellow card) 52'; Arboleda (red card) 75'; Diego Costa (yellow card) 78'; Erick 88'; Calleri 90+3'	Report	Thiago Borbas 7'; Helinho (red card) 71'; Talisson (yellow card) 81'; Laquintana 90+6'	Stadium: Morumbi; Attendance: 44,756; Referee: Vinícius Gonçalves Dias Araújo

25 February 2024 10	Guarani	1–1	São Paulo	Campinas
18:00 (UTC−3)	Márcio Silva (yellow card) 16'; Léo Santos (yellow card) 23', (goal) 45+6'; Camacho (yellow card) 34'; Anderson Leite (yellow card) 46'; Vladimir (yellow card) 90+7'; Diogo Mateus (yellow card) 90+8'	Report	Calleri 25'; Igor Vinícius (yellow card) 26'; Alisson (yellow card) 45'; Lucas Moura (yellow card) 57'	Stadium: Estádio Brinco de Ouro; Attendance: 9,370; Referee: Lucas Canetto Bellote

28 February 2024 5	Internacional de Limeira	0–3	São Paulo	Brasília
21:35 (UTC−3)	Diego Jussani (yellow card) 43'; JP Galvão (yellow card) 72'	Report	Alisson (yellow card) 11'; Ferreira 45+3'; Calleri (yellow card) 61'; Luciano 81'; James Rodríguez 90+5', (yellow card) 90+5'	Stadium: Estádio Nacional Mané Garrincha; Attendance: 30,592; Referee: Fabiano Monteiro dos Santos
Note: The match against Internacional de Limeira, originally scheduled for the 4 February, was postponed, due to the São Paulo participation in the 2024 Supercopa do Brasil.

3 March 2024 11	São Paulo	1–1	Palmeiras	São Paulo
20:00 (UTC−3)	Alisson 25'; Pablo Maia (yellow card) 34'; Rafael (yellow card) 56'	Report	Raphael Veiga (yellow card) 15', (goal) 58' (pen.); Richard Ríos (yellow card) 27'; Zé Rafael (yellow card) 75'; Gabriel Menino (yellow card) 82'	Stadium: Morumbi; Attendance: 55,030; Referee: Matheus Delgado Candançan

10 March 2024 12	Ituano	2–3	São Paulo	Itu
16:00 (UTC−3)	Zé Carlos 27', 89'; Bruno Alves (yellow card) 30' (yellow-red card) 90+3'; Thonny Anderson (yellow card) 56'	Report	Ferreira 19'; Luciano 36'; Diego Costa (yellow card) 83'; Lucas Moura 90+8' (pen.)	Stadium: Estádio Novelli Júnior; Attendance: 10,864; Referee: Raphael Claus

==== Quarter-final ====
17 March 2024 Single match	São Paulo	1–1 (4–5 p)	Novorizontino	São Paulo
18:00 (UTC−3)	Ferreira 23'; Arboleda (yellow card) 58'	Report	Rômulo 12'; Waguininho (yellow card) 59'; Marlon (yellow card) 67'; Chico (yellow card) 75'; Lucca (yellow card) 87'	Stadium: Morumbi; Attendance: 55,197; Referee: Flávio Rodrigues de Souza
	Penalties
	Lucas Moura (penalty scored); Luciano (penalty scored); Pablo Maia (penalty scored); Michel Araújo (penalty missed); Igor Vinícius (penalty scored); Diego Costa (penalty missed)		Lucca (penalty missed); Danilo Barcelos (penalty scored); Fabrício Daniel (penalty scored); Chico (penalty scored); Marlon (penalty scored); Renato Palm (penalty scored)

=== Copa Libertadores ===
The draw for the group stage was held on 18 March 2024, 20:00 PYST (UTC−3), at the CONMEBOL Convention Centre in Luque, Paraguay.

Pos	Team	Pld	W	D	L	GF	GA	GD	Pts	Qualification	SPA	TAL	BSC	COB
1	(Brazil) São Paulo	6	4	1	1	10	3	+7	13	Advance to round of 16	—	2–0	0–0	2–0
2	(Argentina) Talleres	6	4	1	1	10	6	+4	13	Advance to round of 16	2–1	—	3–1	1–0
3	(Ecuador) Barcelona	6	1	3	2	6	9	−3	6	Transfer to Copa Sudamericana	0–2	2–2	—	2–1
4	(Chile) Cobresal	6	0	1	5	3	11	−8	1		1–3	0–2	1–1	—

Source: CONMEBOL
Rules for classification: 1) Points; 2) Goal difference; 3) Goals scored; 4) Away goals scored; 5) CONMEBOL ranking.

4 April 2024 1	Talleres (Argentina)	2–1	(Brazil) São Paulo	Córdoba, Argentina
21:00 UTC−3	Benavídez (yellow card) 23'; Ruiz Rodríguez 45+6'; Botta 53'; Portilla (yellow card) 72'; Bustos (yellow card) 90'	Report	Rafinha (yellow card) 2'; Luciano 66'	Stadium: Estadio Mario Alberto Kempes; Attendance: 35,568; Referee: Alexis Herrera (Venezuela)

10 April 2024 2	São Paulo (Brazil)	2–0	(Chile) Cobresal	São Paulo, Brazil
21:30 UTC−3	Luciano (yellow card) 26'; Pablo Maia (yellow card) 29'; Galoppo (yellow card) 72'; André Silva 82'; Calleri 88'	Report	Bechtholdt (yellow card) 18'; Castro (yellow card) 28'; Valencia (yellow card) 67'; Navarro (yellow card) 86'	Stadium: Morumbi; Attendance: 49,502; Referee: Carlos Ortega (Colombia)

25 April 2024 3	Barcelona (Ecuador)	0–2	(Brazil) São Paulo	Guayaquil, Ecuador
21:00 UTC−3	Vargas (yellow card) 45+1'	Report	Calleri 17'; Alisson 64'	Stadium: Estadio Monumental Isidro Romero Carbo; Attendance: 20,581; Referee: Juan Benítez (Paraguay)

8 May 2024 4	Cobresal (Chile)	1–3	(Brazil) São Paulo	Calama, Chile
21:30 UTC−3	Diego Coelho 23'; Pacheco (yellow card) 72'; Franco Lobos (yellow card) 88'		Luciano 38'; Rodrigo Nestor 60'; Calleri 78'	Stadium: Estadio Zorros del Desierto; Attendance: 3,029; Referee: Juan López (Paraguay)

16 May 2024 5	São Paulo (Brazil)	0–0	(Ecuador) Barcelona	São Paulo, Brazil
21:00 UTC−3	Igor Vinícius (yellow card) 55'	Report	Sosa (yellow card) 89'; Solano (yellow card) 90'; Burrai (yellow card) 90+3'	Stadium: Morumbi; Attendance: 50,516; Referee: Kevin Ortega (Peru)

29 May 2024 6	São Paulo (Brazil)	2–0	(Argentina) Talleres	São Paulo, Brazil
21:30 UTC−3	Welington (yellow card) 4'; Lucas Moura 45+4' (pen.); Calleri (yellow card) 64'; Luciano 90'; Erick (yellow card) 90+2'		Barticciotto (yellow card) 13'; Lucas Suárez (yellow card) 45+7'; Portilla (yellow card) 56'; Portillo (yellow card) 90+2'; Navarro (red card) 90+3'	Stadium: Morumbi; Attendance: 56,162; Referee: Jhon Ospina (Colombia)

==== Round of 16 ====
The draw for the round of 16 was held in 3 June, 12:00 PYST (UTC−4), at the CONMEBOL Convention Centre in Luque, Paraguay.

15 August 2024 First leg	Nacional (Uruguay)	0–0	(Brazil) São Paulo	Montevideo, Uruguay
19:00 UTC−3	Polenta (yellow card) 13'; Pereyra (yellow card) 86'	Report	Luciano (yellow card) 25'; Arboleda (yellow card) 36'; Luiz Gustavo (yellow card) 49'; Alan Franco (yellow card) 58'	Stadium: Estadio Gran Parque Central; Attendance: 31,102; Referee: Facundo Tello (Argentina)

22 August 2024 Second leg	São Paulo (Brazil)	2–0 (2–0 agg.)	(Uruguay) Nacional	São Paulo, Brazil
19:00 UTC−3	Bobadilla 31'; Luiz Gustavo (yellow card) 44'; Calleri 47'; Marcos Antônio (yellow card) 90+14'	Report	Báez (yellow card) 90+13'; Lozano (yellow card) 90+15'	Stadium: Morumbi; Attendance: 60,032; Referee: Jhon Ospina (Colombia)

==== Quarter-finals ====
18 September 2024 First leg	Botafogo (Brazil)	0–0	(Brazil) São Paulo	Rio de Janeiro, Brazil
21:30 UTC−3	Luiz Henrique (yellow card) 30'; Bastos (yellow card) 72'	Report	Rafinha (yellow card) 82'; Arboleda (yellow card) 90+4'	Stadium: Estádio Nilton Santos; Attendance: 40,089; Referee: Esteban Ostojich (Uruguay)

25 September 2024 Second leg	São Paulo (Brazil)	1–1 (1–1 agg.) (4–5 p)	(Brazil) Botafogo	São Paulo, Brazil
21:30 UTC−3	Lucas Moura (penalty missed) 45+5'; Bobadilla (yellow card) 53'; Nestor (yellow card) 79'; Calleri 87'; Rafinha (yellow card) 90+2' (yellow-red card) 90+2'; Igor Vinícius (yellow card) 90+7'		Almada 15'; Barboza (yellow card) 45+2'; John (yellow card) 49'; Gatito Fernández (red card) 90+2'; Marçal (yellow card) 90+2'	Stadium: Morumbi; Attendance: 61,329; Referee: Darío Herrera (Argentina)
	Penalties
	Calleri (penalty missed); Luiz Gustavo (penalty scored); Lucas Moura (penalty scored); Igor Vinícius (penalty scored); Luciano (penalty scored); Nestor (penalty missed)		(penalty scored) Tchê Tchê; (penalty scored) Danilo Barbosa; (penalty scored) Marçal; (penalty missed) Vitinho; (penalty scored) Almada; (penalty scored) Matheus Martins

=== Série A ===
==== League table ====
Pos	Team	Pld	W	D	L	GF	GA	GD	Pts	Qualification or relegation
4	Fortaleza	38	19	11	8	53	39	+14	68	Qualification for Copa Libertadores group stage (Note: Botafogo and Flamengo qualified for the Copa Libertadores group stage by winning the 2024 Copa Libertadores and the 2024 Copa do Brasil, respectively.)
5	Internacional	38	18	11	9	53	36	+17	65	Qualification for Copa Libertadores group stage
6	São Paulo	38	17	8	13	53	43	+10	59	Qualification for Copa Libertadores group stage
7	Corinthians	38	15	11	12	54	45	+9	56	Qualification for Copa Libertadores second stage
8	Bahia	38	15	8	15	49	49	0	53	Qualification for Copa Libertadores second stage

Source: CBF
Rules for classification: 1) points; 2) wins; 3) goal difference; 4) goals scored; 5) head-to-head results (only between two teams); 6) fewest red cards; 7) fewest yellow cards; 8) drawing of lots.

==== Results summary ====
Overall								Home						Away					
Pld	W	D	L	GF	GA	GD	Pts	W	D	L	GF	GA	GD	W	D	L	GF	GA	GD
38	17	8	13	50	43	+7	59	12	3	4	28	18	+10	5	5	9	22	25	−3

==== Results by round ====
Round	1	2	3	4	5	6	7	8	9	10	11	12	13	14	15	16	17	18	19	20	21	22	23	24	25	26	27	28	29	30	31	32	33	34	35	36	37	38
Ground	H	A	A	H	A	H	H	A	A	H	A	H	H	A	H	A	H	A	H	A	H	H	A	H	A	A	H	H	A	H	A	A	H	A	H	A	H	A
Result	L	L	W	D	W	W	W	D	D	L	L	W	W	W	W	L	W	D	D	L	W	W	L	W	L	W	L	W	L	W	D	W	W	D	D	L	L	L
Position	16	18	14	14	8	5	4	5	6	7	9	7	6	5	4	5	4	5	6	6	6	5	6	5	6	5	5	5	5	5	6	6	6	6	6	6	6	6

Postponed

Source: CBF.com

==== Matches ====
The league fixtures were announced on 29 February 2024.

13 April 2024 1	São Paulo	1–2	Fortaleza	São Paulo
21:00 UTC−3	Luciano (yellow card) 75'; André Silva 84'; Calleri (yellow card) 90+8'	Report	Pochettino (yellow card) 23'; Brítez (yellow card) 51'; Lucero (yellow card) 54', (goal) 66'; Machuca 80'	Stadium: Morumbi; Attendance: 35,055; Referee: Alex Gomes Stefano

17 April 2024 2	Flamengo	2–1	São Paulo	Rio de Janeiro
21:30 UTC−3	Luiz Araújo 20'; Fabrício Bruno (yellow card) 26'; Nicolás de la Cruz 54'	Report	Igor Vinícius (yellow card) 3'; Michel Araújo (yellow card) 40'; Ferreira 79'; Luciano (yellow card) 88'	Stadium: Maracanã; Attendance: 48,103; Referee: Anderson Daronco

21 April 2024 3	Atlético Goianiense	0–3	São Paulo	Goiânia
18:30 UTC−3	Baralhas (yellow card) 33'; Roni (yellow card) 39'; Gabriel Barros (yellow card) 47' (yellow-red card) 63'; Luiz Felipe (red card) 51'; Luiz Fernando (yellow card) 84'	Report	Calleri 14'; Luciano 52' (pen.); Ferreira 76'	Stadium: Estádio Antônio Accioly; Attendance: 9,017; Referee: Bráulio da Silva Machado

29 April 2024 4	São Paulo	0–0	Palmeiras	São Paulo
20:00 UTC−3	Diego Costa (yellow card) 29'; Igor Vinícius (yellow card) 43'; Calleri (yellow card) 59'; Michel Araújo (yellow card) 69'	Report	Gustavo Gómez (yellow card) 40'; Endrick (yellow card) 45'; Murilo (yellow card) 59'	Stadium: Morumbi; Attendance: 55,694; Referee: Wilton Pereira Sampaio

5 May 2024 5	Vitória	1–3	São Paulo	Salvador
16:00 UTC−3	Wagner Leonardo (red card) 7'; Bruno Uvini (yellow card) 25'; Willian 49'; Lucas Esteves (yellow card) 60'; Dudu (yellow card) 87'	Report	Bobadilla (yellow card) 14'; Galoppo (yellow card) 36'; Alan Franco (yellow card) 36'; Luciano 45', 53'; Michel Araújo (yellow card) 82'; Ferraresi 84'	Stadium: Barradão; Attendance: 25,739; Referee: Ramon Abatti Abel

13 May 2024 6	São Paulo	2–1	Fluminense	São Paulo
20:00 UTC−3	Rodrigo Nestor (yellow card) 9'; Bobadilla 32'; Alisson (yellow card) 34'; Luciano (yellow card) 45+7'; Igor Vinícius (yellow card) 59'; Arboleda 84'; Erick (yellow card) 90+5'	Report	Lima (yellow card) 23'; Manoel (yellow card) 24'; Igor Vinícius 28' (o.g.); Alexsander (yellow card) 56'	Stadium: Morumbi; Attendance: 39,515; Referee: Anderson Daronco

2 June 2024 7	São Paulo	2–0	Cruzeiro	São Paulo
18:30 UTC−3	Lucas Moura 5'; Alan Franco (yellow card) 45+8'; Calleri 48'; Alisson (yellow card) 80'	Report	Barreal (yellow card) 13'; Marlon Xavier (red card) 38'; Kaiki Bruno (yellow card) 63'	Stadium: Morumbi; Attendance: 44,928; Referee: Lucas Paulo Torezin

13 June 2024 8	Internacional	0–0	São Paulo	Criciúma
20:00 UTC−3	Fernando (yellow card) 34'; Vitão (yellow card) 57'; Bustos (yellow card) 57'; Aránguiz (yellow card) 72'; Bruno Gomes (yellow card) 90+6'	Report	Luiz Gustavo (yellow card) 66'; Galoppo (yellow card) 82'; Calleri (yellow card) 84'; Ferreira (yellow card) 90+6'	Stadium: Estádio Heriberto Hülse; Attendance: 17,987; Referee: Bráulio da Silva Machado

16 June 2024 9	Corinthians	2–2	São Paulo	São Paulo
16:00 UTC−3	Igor Coronado 31'; Carlos Miguel (yellow card) 42'; Gustavo Silva 45+3'; Caetano (yellow card) 69' (yellow-red card) 77'; Breno Bidon (yellow card) 82'	Report	Lucas Moura 4', (yellow card) 83'; Young (yellow card) 4'; Diego Costa (yellow card) 21'; Cacá 41' (o.g.); Luciano (yellow card) 44'; Alan Franco (yellow card) 90+1'	Stadium: Neo Química Arena; Attendance: 46,129; Referee: Ramon Abatti Abel

19 June 2024 10	São Paulo	0–1	Cuiabá	São Paulo
20:00 UTC−3	Alisson (yellow card) 36'; William Gomes (yellow card) 77'	Report	Eliel 82'; Mateus Pasinato (yellow card) 84'; Railan (yellow card) 87'; Ramon (yellow card) 88'	Stadium: Morumbi; Attendance: 33,586; Referee: Gustavo Ervino Bauermann

22 June 2024 11	Vasco	4–1	São Paulo	Rio de Janeiro
21:30 UTC−3	Alan Franco 33' (o.g.); Guilherme Estrella (yellow card) 39', (goal) 45+3'; Maicon (yellow card) 77'; Leandrinho 80'; Rossi (yellow card) 88'; David 90+3'	Report	André Silva 10'; Patryck Lanza (yellow card) 36'	Stadium: Estádio São Januário; Attendance: 5,036; Referee: Caio Max Augusto Vieira

27 June 2024 12	São Paulo	2–1	Criciúma	São Paulo
20:00 UTC−3	Alisson 1'; Luciano 22', (yellow card) 60'; Arboleda (yellow card) 26'	Report	Marquinhos Gabriel (yellow card) 14'; Ronald (yellow card) 21'; Newton (yellow card) 34'; Claudinho (yellow card) 79'; Arthur Caíke 90+2'	Stadium: Morumbi; Attendance: 28,008; Referee: Bruno Pereira Vasconcelos

30 June 2024 13	São Paulo	3–1	Bahia	São Paulo
16:00 UTC−3	Calleri 30'; Ferreira 32', (yellow card) 33'; Luciano (yellow card) 65', (goal) 65'; Alisson (yellow card) 86'; Luiz Gustavo (yellow card) 89'	Report	Kanu (yellow card) 44'; Gilberto 49'	Stadium: Morumbi; Attendance: 49,037; Referee: Marcelo de Lima Henrique

3 July 2024 14	Athletico Paranaense	1–2	São Paulo	Curitiba
21:30 UTC−3	Fernandinho 38'; Léo Linck (red card) 76'	Report	Ferreira 33', (yellow card) 87'; Calleri 61', (yellow card) 66'	Stadium: Ligga Arena; Attendance: 28,632; Referee: Alex Gomes Stefano

6 July 2024 15	São Paulo	2–0	Red Bull Bragantino	São Paulo
20:00 UTC−3	André Silva 65'; Arboleda (yellow card) 68'; Luciano (penalty missed) 90', 90+1'; Welington (yellow card) 90+6'	Report	Sasha (yellow card) 43'; Lincoln (yellow card) 88'	Stadium: Morumbi; Attendance: 46,321; Referee: Bruno Pereira Vasconcelos

11 July 2024 16	Atlético Mineiro	2–1	São Paulo	Belo Horizonte
21:30 UTC−3	Battaglia (yellow card) 9'; Vargas 13'; Hulk (yellow card) 44'; Paulinho 45+3'	Report	Lucas Moura 18'; Alan Franco (red card) 59'; Luiz Gustavo (yellow card) 83'	Stadium: Arena MRV; Attendance: 28,772; Referee: Marcelo de Lima Henrique

17 July 2024 17	São Paulo	1–0	Grêmio	São Paulo
20:00 UTC−3	Lucas Moura 10', (yellow card) 41'; Igor Vinícius (yellow card) 38' (yellow-red card) 90+9'; Rafael (yellow card) 78'; Welington (yellow card) 90+1'	Report	Pepê (yellow card) 23'; Villasanti (yellow card) 31'; Nathan Fernandes (yellow card) 80'; Ferreira (yellow card) 90+13'	Stadium: Morumbi; Attendance: 53,168; Referee: Gustavo Ervino Bauermann

21 July 2024 18	Juventude	0–0	São Paulo	Brasília
18:30 UTC−3	Jadson (yellow card) 28'; Rodrigo Sam (yellow card) 35'; João Lucas (yellow card) 51'; Caíque (yellow card) 90+7'	Report	Alan Franco (yellow card) 12'; Luciano (yellow card) 18'	Stadium: Estádio Nacional Mané Garrincha; Attendance: 26,476; Referee: Wilton Pereira Sampaio

24 July 2024 19	São Paulo	2–2	Botafogo	São Paulo
19:30 UTC−3	Lucas Moura 6' (pen.), (yellow card) 51'; Rafinha (yellow card) 24'; Alan Franco (yellow card) 45+5'; Welington (yellow card) 59'; Ferreira 60'; Luciano (yellow card) 76'	Report	Tiquinho Soares 11' (pen.); Cuiabano 22', (yellow card) 63'; Gregore (yellow card) 39'; Marlon Freitas (yellow card) 62'	Stadium: Morumbi; Attendance: 53,244; Referee: Felipe Fernandes de Lima

27 July 2024 20	Fortaleza	1–0	São Paulo	Fortaleza
21:30 UTC−3	Renato Kayzer 4' (pen.); Brítez (yellow card) 65'; Hércules (yellow card) 89', (red card) 89'	Report	Luciano (yellow card) 12'; Welington (yellow card) 57'; Bobadilla (yellow card) 70'	Stadium: Arena Castelão; Attendance: 41,322; Referee: Davi de Oliveira Lacerda

3 August 2024 21	São Paulo	1–0	Flamengo	São Paulo
21:30 UTC−3	Wellington Rato (yellow card) 32'; Calleri 61'	Report	Matheus Gonçalves (yellow card) 70'; David Luiz (yellow card) 74'; Bruno Henrique (yellow card) 79'	Stadium: Morumbi; Attendance: 58,065; Referee: Rafael Rodrigo Klein

11 August 2024 22	São Paulo	1–0	Atlético Goianiense	São Paulo
16:00 UTC−3	André Silva 15'; Liziero (yellow card) 59'	Report	Baralhas (yellow card) 53'	Stadium: Morumbi; Attendance: 46,600; Referee: Davi de Oliveira Lacerda

18 August 2024 23	Palmeiras	2–1	São Paulo	São Paulo
16:00 UTC−3	Vitor Reis (yellow card) 45+2'; José López 52', 90+12', (yellow card) 90+14'; Gustavo Gómez (yellow card) 59'; Marcos Rocha (yellow card) 90+2'	Report	Sabino (yellow card) 43'; Luciano 72', (yellow card) 74' (yellow-red card) 90+6'	Stadium: Allianz Parque; Attendance: 35,791; Referee: Raphael Claus

25 August 2024 24	São Paulo	2–1	Vitória	São Paulo
18:30 UTC−3	William Gomes 6'; Erick 30'	Report	Alerrandro 62' (pen.); Willian Oliveira (yellow card) 86'; Zé Hugo (yellow card) 87'	Stadium: Morumbi; Attendance: 32,712; Referee: Wilton Pereira Sampaio

1 September 2024 25	Fluminense	2–0	São Paulo	Rio de Janeiro
18:30 UTC−3	Kauã Elias 31'; Thiago Santos (yellow card) 50'; Bernal (yellow card) 58'; Keno (yellow card) 80', (goal) 90+1'; Thiago Silva (yellow card) 86'	Report	Rafinha (yellow card) 32'; Calleri (yellow card) 38'; Bobadilla (yellow card) 42'; Welington (yellow card) 90+6'	Stadium: Maracanã; Attendance: 45,759; Referee: Paulo César Zanovelli da Silva

15 September 2024 26	Cruzeiro	0–1	São Paulo	Belo Horizonte
18:30 UTC−3	Kaio Jorge (yellow card) 19'; Matheus Henrique (yellow card) 43'; Lucas Romero (yellow card) 45+7'; Gabriel Veron (yellow card) 74'	Report	Ferraresi (yellow card) 5'; Michel Araújo (yellow card) 43'; William Gomes 59'; André Silva (yellow card) 90+4'	Stadium: Mineirão; Attendance: 44,743; Referee: Wilton Pereira Sampaio

22 September 2024 27	São Paulo	1–3	Internacional	São Paulo
18:30 UTC−3	Luciano 5'; André Silva (yellow card) 45+6'; Erick (yellow card) 59'; William Gomes (yellow card) 79'; Calleri (yellow card) 84'; Nestor (yellow card) 90'	Report	Bruno Gomes 42'; Wesley (yellow card) 45+3'; Thiago Maia 54'; Alan Patrick 63'	Stadium: Morumbi; Attendance: 39,078; Referee: Ramon Abatti Abel

29 September 2024 28	São Paulo	3–1	Corinthians	Brasília
16:00 UTC−3	Luciano (yellow card) 38'; Lucas Moura 45+8' (pen.); Rafinha (yellow card) 52'; Alan Franco (yellow card) 69'; Arboleda 75'; Ferraresi (yellow card) 88'; Calleri (yellow card) 90+5'; Erick (yellow card) 90+7'; André Silva 90+8'	Report	Fagner (yellow card) 28' (yellow-red card) 45+5'; Romero (yellow card) 45+11'; Igor Coronado (yellow card) 48'; André Ramalho (red card) 63'; Charles (yellow card) 63'; Yuri Alberto 83'; Pedro Henrique (yellow card) 85'	Stadium: Estádio Nacional Mané Garrincha; Attendance: 25,898; Referee: Rafael Rodrigo Klein
Note: The match originally scheduled for Estádio do Morumbi was rescheduled to Brasília, due to the Bruno Mars tour in Brazil.

5 October 2024 29	Cuiabá	2–0	São Paulo	Cuiabá
19:00 UTC−3	Bruno Alves 4'; Lucas Fernandes (yellow card) 19'; Clayson 42'; Matheus Alexandre (yellow card) 78'	Report	André Silva (yellow card) 21'; Arboleda (yellow card) 38'	Stadium: Arena Pantanal; Attendance: 11,883; Referee: Anderson Daronco

16 October 2024 30	São Paulo	3–0	Vasco	Campinas
21:45 UTC−3	Luciano 9'; Lucas Moura 46', 67'; Welington (yellow card) 65'	Report		Stadium: Brinco de Ouro; Attendance: 15,497; Referee: Davi de Oliveira Lacerda
Note: The match originally scheduled for Estádio do Morumbi was rescheduled to Campinas, due to the Bruno Mars tour in Brazil.

26 October 2024 31	Criciúma	1–1	São Paulo	Criciúma
21:00 UTC−3	Felipe Vizeu 22'; Newton (yellow card) 40'; Jonathan (yellow card) 89'	Report	Liziero 87'	Stadium: Estádio Heriberto Hülse; Attendance: 17,422; Referee: Rafael Rodrigo Klein

5 November 2024 32	Bahia	0–3	São Paulo	Salvador
21:30 UTC−3	Jean Lucas (yellow card) 51'; Kanu (yellow card) 61'; Gabriel Xavier (yellow card) 81'	Report	Marcos Antônio (yellow card) 36'; Luiz Gustavo 41'; Sabino (yellow card) 55'; Wellington Rato 66'; Lucas Moura 90+1'	Stadium: Arena Fonte Nova; Attendance: 29,736; Referee: Alex Gomes Stefano

9 November 2024 33	São Paulo	2–1	Athletico Paranaense	São Paulo
21:00 UTC−3	Luciano 52'; Lucas Moura (yellow card) 74'; André Silva 89'; Igor Vinícius (yellow card) 90+2'	Report	Leonardo Godoy (yellow card) 3'; Erick (yellow card) 42'; Felipinho (yellow card) 62'; Julimar 69', (yellow card) 75'; Lucas Belezi (yellow card) 81'	Stadium: Morumbi; Attendance: 34,777; Referee: Rafael Rodrigo Klein

20 November 2024 34	Red Bull Bragantino	1–1	São Paulo	Bragança Paulista
16:30 UTC−3	Sasha 15'; Matheus Fernandes (yellow card) 41'; Eduardo Santos (yellow card) 44'; Hurtado (yellow card) 62'	Report	Lucas Moura 25'; Sabino (yellow card) 50'; Alisson (yellow card) 66'	Stadium: Estádio Nabi Abi Chedid; Attendance: 9,017; Referee: Wilton Pereira Sampaio

23 November 2024 35	São Paulo	2–2	Atlético Mineiro	São Paulo
21:30 UTC−3	Fausto Vera 24' (o.g.); André Silva 45+1'; Luciano (yellow card) 53'; Ruan Tressoldi (yellow card) 54'; Igor Vinícius (yellow card) 63'	Report	Paulinho 1', 18'; Mariano (yellow card) 45+6' (yellow-red card) 45+6'; Saravia (yellow card) 53'; Lyanco (yellow card) 56'; Paulo Vitor (yellow card) 89'	Stadium: Morumbi; Attendance: 36,783; Referee: Alex Gomes Stefano

1 December 2024 36	Grêmio	2–1	São Paulo	Porto Alegre
16:00 UTC−3	Cristaldo 36'; Ruan Tressoldi 45+1' (o.g.); Pavón (yellow card) 90+5'	Report	Luiz Gustavo 64'; Wellington Rato (yellow card) 72'	Stadium: Arena do Grêmio; Attendance: 39,414; Referee: Ramon Abatti Abel

4 December 2024 37	São Paulo	1–2	Juventude	São Paulo
20:00 UTC−3	Luciano 77'	Report	Lucas Barbosa (yellow card) 18'; Gabriel Taliari 52'; Erick Farias 62'; Gabriel (yellow card) 83'	Stadium: Morumbi; Attendance: 31,442; Referee: Sávio Pereira Sampaio

8 December 2024 38	Botafogo	2–1	São Paulo	Rio de Janeiro
16:00 UTC−3	Savarino 37'; Gregore 90+2'	Report	William Gomes 63'	Stadium: Estádio Nilton Santos; Attendance: 41,986; Referee: Anderson Daronco

=== Copa do Brasil ===
==== Third round ====
2 May 2024 First leg	Águia de Marabá	1–3	São Paulo	Belém
19:30 UTC−3	Caíque Baiano (yellow card) 25'; Braga (yellow card) 27'; Wander (red card) 31'; Wender 35', (yellow card) 40'; Betão (yellow card) 58'	Report	Rodrigo Nestor (yellow card) 35'; Juan 37', 41'; Galoppo (yellow card) 45+4'; Luiz Gustavo 63'; Bobadilla (yellow card) 75'	Stadium: Mangueirão; Attendance: 23,389; Referee: Arthur Gomes Rabelo

23 May 2024 Second leg	São Paulo	2–0 (5–1 agg.)	Águia de Marabá	São Paulo
21:30 UTC−3	Lucas Moura 36' (pen.); Erick 44'	Report	Wender (yellow card) 48'	Stadium: Morumbi; Attendance: 38,409; Referee: Marcelo de Lima Henrique

==== Round of 16 ====
30 July 2024 First leg	São Paulo	2–0	Goiás	São Paulo
20:00 UTC−3	Calleri (yellow card) 42', (goal) 80'; Luciano 47', (yellow card) 87'	Report	Marcão (red card) 35'; Thiago Rodrigues (yellow card) 45+7'	Stadium: Morumbi; Attendance: 45,191; Referee: Jonathan Benkenstein Pinheiro

8 August 2024 Second leg	Goiás	0–0 (0–2 agg.)	São Paulo	Goiânia
20:00 UTC−3	Ángelo Rodríguez (yellow card) 26'; Sander (yellow card) 31'; David Braz (yellow card) 80'; Thiago Galhardo (red card) 90+7'	Report	Luciano (yellow card) 14'; Ferreira (yellow card) 64'; Rafael (yellow card) 87'; Welington (yellow card) 90+1'; Alan Franco (red card) 90+7'; Rafinha (yellow card) 90+7'	Stadium: Estádio da Serrinha; Attendance: 8,281; Referee: Paulo César Zanovelli da Silva

==== Quarter-finals ====
28 August 2024 First leg	São Paulo	0–1	Atlético Mineiro	São Paulo
21:30 UTC−3	Rafinha (yellow card) 61'; Arboleda (yellow card) 90+6'	Report	Júnior Alonso (yellow card) 46'; Otávio (yellow card) 63'; Igor Gomes (yellow card) 77'; Saravia (yellow card) 81'; Battaglia 90+2'	Stadium: Morumbi; Attendance: 51,432; Referee: Rafael Rodrigo Klein

12 September 2024 Second leg	Atlético Mineiro	0–0 (1–0 agg.)	São Paulo	Belo Horizonte
21:45 UTC−3	Júnior Alonso (yellow card) 20'; Saravia (yellow card) 63'; Alan Franco (yellow card) 84'; Rubens (yellow card) 90+2'	Report	Luiz Gustavo (yellow card) 43'; Wellington Rato (yellow card) 52'; Luciano (yellow card) 60'; Rafinha (yellow card) 77'	Stadium: Arena MRV; Attendance: 41,552; Referee: Ramon Abatti Abel

=== Supercopa do Brasil ===
São Paulo qualified for the 2024 Supercopa do Brasil by winning the 2023 Copa do Brasil.

4 February 2024	Palmeiras	0–0 (2–4 p)	São Paulo	Belo Horizonte
16:00 UTC−3	Raphael Veiga (yellow card) 15'; Zé Rafael (yellow card) 23'; José López (yellow card) 32'; Marcos Rocha (yellow card) 90+1'; Luis Guilherme (yellow card) 90+5'	Report	Luciano (yellow card) 2'; Pablo Maia (yellow card) 64'; Welington (yellow card) 73'; Erick (yellow card) 90+2'	Stadium: Mineirão; Attendance: 42,741; Referee: Bráulio da Silva Machado
	Penalties
	Raphael Veiga (penalty scored); Gabriel Menino (penalty scored); Murilo (penalty missed); Piquerez (penalty missed)		(penalty scored) Calleri; (penalty scored) Galoppo; (penalty scored) Pablo Maia; (penalty scored) Michel Araújo

== Statistics ==
=== Goals scored ===
Rank	Player	BR	CdB	CP	CL	SB	Total
1	Luciano	11	1	3	3	0	18
2	Jonathan Calleri	5	1	3	5	0	14
2	Lucas Moura	10	1	2	1	0	14
4	André Silva	7	0	0	1	0	8
4	Ferreira	5	0	3	0	0	8
6	Luiz Gustavo	2	1	2	0	0	5
7	Alisson	1	0	1	1	0	3
7	Damián Bobadilla	1	0	1	1	0	3
7	Erick	1	1	1	0	0	3
7	Juan	0	2	1	0	0	3
7	William Gomes	3	0	0	0	0	3
12	Robert Arboleda	2	0	0	0	0	2
13	Alan Franco	0	0	1	0	0	1
13	Diego Costa	0	0	1	0	0	1
13	Giuliano Galoppo	0	0	1	0	0	1
13	Igor Liziero	1	0	0	0	0	1
13	James Rodríguez	0	0	1	0	0	1
13	Nahuel Ferraresi	1	0	0	0	0	1
13	Rodrigo Nestor	0	0	0	1	0	1
13	Wellington Rato	1	0	0	0	0	1
Own goals		2	0	0	0	0	2
Total		53	7	21	13	0	94
