= Léo Silva (disambiguation) =

Léo Silva may refer to:

- Léo Silva (born 1985), full name Hugo Leonardo da Silva Serejo, Brazilian football midfielder
- Léo Lelis (born 1993), full name Leonardo Silva Lelis, Brazilian football centre-back
- Léo Silva (footballer, born 2000), full name Vinicius Leonardo da Silva, Brazilian football centre-back
- Léo Silva (footballer, born 2003), full name Leonardo de Almeida Silva, Brazilian football midfielder
