= Matheus Alves =

Matheus Alves may refer to:

- Matheus Alves (footballer, born 1993), full name Matheus Alves Leandro, Brazilian football forward
- Matheus Alves (footballer, born 2005), full name Matheus Alves Nascimento, Brazilian football midfielder
