= Henrique Carmo =

Brazilian footballer (born 2006)

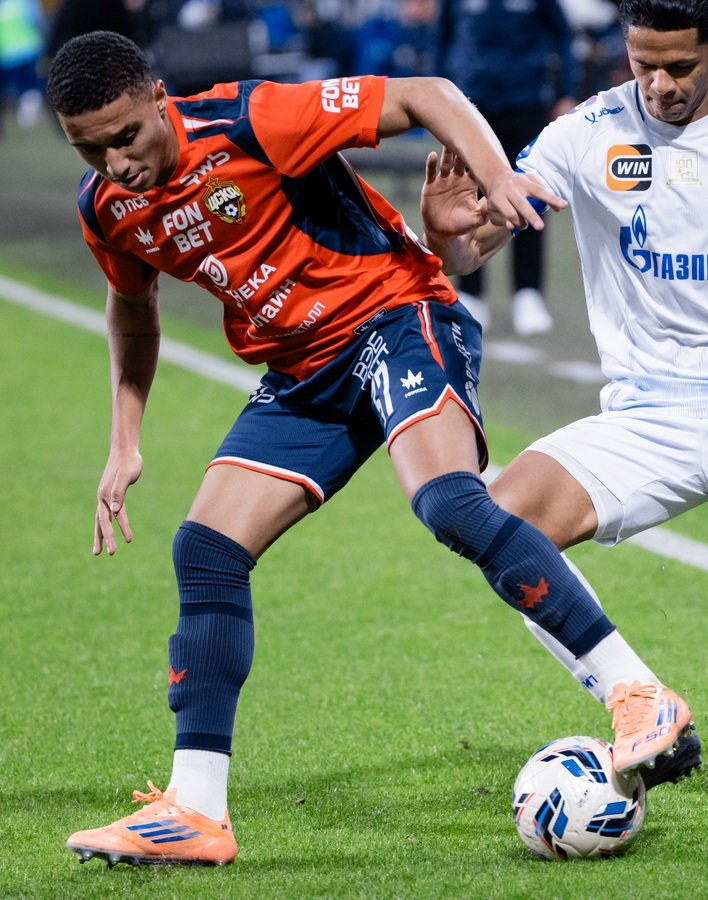
- Carmo with CSKA Moscow in 2026

Personal information
- Full name: Henrique Fabiano do Carmo
- Date of birth: 9 November 2006 (age 20)
- Place of birth: Joinville, Brazil
- Height: 1.74 m (5 ft 9 in)
- Position: Winger

Team information
- Current team: CSKA Moscow
- Number: 37

Youth career
- 2013–2025: São Paulo

Senior career*
Years	Team	Apps	(Gls)
2024–2025	São Paulo	5	(0)
2025–	CSKA Moscow	27	(3)

International career
2022	Brazil U16	3	(1)
- * Club domestic league appearances and goals as of 21 November 2026

Henrique Fabiano do Carmo (born 9 November 2006), known as Henrique Carmo, is a Brazilian professional footballer who plays as a winger for Russian Premier League club CSKA Moscow.

== Club career ==
=== São Paulo ===
Born in Joinville, Santa Catarina, Henrique Carmo joined São Paulo FC's youth setup at the age of seven. On 19 December 2022, he signed his first professional contract with the club.

Henrique Carmo made his first team – and Série A – debut with Tricolor on 25 August 2024, coming on as a late substitute for Erick in a 2–1 home win over Vitória.

=== CSKA Moscow ===
On 11 September 2025, Henrique Carmo joined Russian Premier League side CSKA Moscow, signing a five-year contract.

== Career statistics ==
=== Club ===
As of 21 November 2026

Club	Season	League			State league		Cup		Continental		Total	
Club	Season	Division	Apps	Goals	Apps	Goals	Apps	Goals	Apps	Goals	Apps	Goals
São Paulo	2024	Série A	1	0	0	0	0	0	0	0	1	0
São Paulo	2025	Série A	3	0	1	0	0	0	2 (Note: Appearances in Copa Libertadores)	0	6	0
São Paulo	Total		4	0	1	0	0	0	2	0	7	0
CSKA Moscow	2025–26	Russian Premier League	19	1	–		7	0	–		26	1
CSKA Moscow	2026–27	Russian Premier League	8	2	–		5	1	–		13	3
CSKA Moscow	Total		27	3	0	0	12	1	0	0	39	4
Career total			31	3	1	0	12	1	2	0	46	4

== Honours ==
São Paulo U20

- Copa São Paulo de Futebol Jr.: 2025
