= André Silva (footballer, born 1997) =

Brazilian footballer

Personal information
- Full name: André Oliveira Silva
- Date of birth: 3 June 1997 (age 29)
- Place of birth: Taboão da Serra, Brazil
- Height: 1.81 m (5 ft 11 in)
- Positions: Striker; winger

Team information
- Current team: São Paulo
- Number: 17

Youth career
- 2012–2017: Diadema
- 2017: → Internacional (loan)
- 2017–2019: Rio Ave

Senior career*
Years	Team	Apps	(Gls)
2019	Rio Ave	2	(0)
2019–2022	Arouca	70	(18)
2022–2024	Vitória de Guimarães	45	(16)
2024–	São Paulo	71	(17)
- * Club domestic league appearances and goals as of 6 April 2026

André Oliveira Silva (born 3 June 1997) is a Brazilian professional footballer who plays as a striker or as a winger for Campeonato Brasileiro Série A club São Paulo.

== Career ==
=== Rio Ave ===
Born in Taboão da Serra, São Paulo, Silva began playing with local CA Diadema before joining Rio Ave in Portugal. He was first called up for a senior game on 3 February 2018, remaining unused in a 5–1 Primeira Liga loss at Benfica. His debut came the following 28 January in a 2–0 win at Marítimo, as a 67th-minute substitute for compatriot Murilo; he and another Brazilian Ronan had been called up by manager Daniel Ramos due to shortages through injuries and transfers.

=== Arouca ===
In 2019, Silva joined Arouca in the third-tier Campeonato de Portugal. He played 12 games as the team were promoted having led their group when the season was cancelled due to the COVID-19 pandemic; he scored once, the first senior goal of his career, in a 9–0 home win over bottom side Ginásio Figueirense on 8 March 2020.

Silva scored eight goals in 27 games as Arouca came third in Liga Portugal 2 in 2020–21; this included two on 21 February 2021 in a 4–0 win at Académico de Viseu. On 26 May, in the Primeira Liga promotion/relegation playoff first leg at home to former club Rio Ave, he concluded a 3–0 win (5–0 aggregate).

Arouca came 15th on their return to the top flight in 2021–22, two points above a relegation play-off place. Silva played 31 of 34 games, all but one as a starter, and scored nine goals, a record for a player from his club in one Primeira Liga season; the previous best was Walter González with seven in 2015–16. He opened and closed the scoring in a 2–2 draw at Tondela on 19 March 2022, and scored twice in four second-half minutes in a 2–1 win over Gil Vicente on 2 April at the Estádio Municipal de Arouca; for his second goal of that game, he lobbed goalkeeper Žiga Frelih from 65 metres. The goal later won the Primeira Liga Goal of the Season for the 2021–22 Primeira Liga.

=== Vitória Guimarães ===
In the summer of 2022, Braga made an offer for Silva, that was far below his €5 million buyout clause. Their Minho rivals Vitória de Guimarães then signed him on 15 July, paying €1 million for 25% of the player's economic rights, with the option to increase the share to 80%; his contract was to 2026.

Silva made his debut on 21 July 2022 in his first European game, a UEFA Europa Conference League first qualifying round first leg at home to Puskás Akadémia of Hungary; he played the first 65 minutes of the 3–0 win (also the aggregate) before being substituted another Brazilian debutant, the unrelated Anderson Silva. He scored the only goal in the first two games of the domestic league season, to give his team victory at Chaves and at home to Estoril Praia in August.

=== São Paulo ===
On 29 February 2024, Silva was announced as a reinforcement for São Paulo FC. After competition from Vasco da Gama, the athlete opted for the club, which will pay €3.5 million for federative rights.

== Career statistics ==
As of match played 11 March 2025

Appearances and goals by club, season and competition
Club	Season	League			State league (Note: Includes Campeonato Paulista)		National cup (Note: Includes Taça de Portugal, Copa do Brasil)		League cup (Note: Includes Taça da Liga)		Continental		Other		Total	
Club	Season	Division	Apps	Goals	Apps	Goals	Apps	Goals	Apps	Goals	Apps	Goals	Apps	Goals	Apps	Goals
Rio Ave	2017–18	Primeira Liga	0	0	—		0	0	0	0	—		—		0	0
Rio Ave	2018–19	Primeira Liga	2	0	—		0	0	0	0	0	0	—		2	0
Rio Ave	Total		2	0	—		0	0	0	0	0	0	—		2	0
Arouca	2019–20	Campeonato de Portugal	12	1	—		0	0	—		—		—		12	1
Arouca	2020–21	Liga Portugal 2	27	8	—		1	0	—		—		2 (Note: Appearance(s) in Liga Portugal 2 Promotion play-offs)	1	30	9
Arouca	2021–22	Primeira Liga	31	9	—		1	0	2	1	—		—		34	10
Arouca	Total		70	18	—		2	0	2	1	—		2	1	76	20
Vitória Guimarães	2022–23	Primeira Liga	23	6	—		2	0	3	0	4 (Note: Appearance(s) in UEFA Europa Conference League)	0	—		32	6
Vitória Guimarães	2023–24	Primeira Liga	22	10	—		3	2	1	0	2	1	—		28	13
Vitória Guimarães	Total		45	16	—		5	2	4	0	6	1	—		60	19
São Paulo	2024	Série A	30	7	1	0	4	0	—		8 (Note: Appearances in Copa Libertadores)	1	—		43	8
São Paulo	2025	Série A	7	5	13	5	0	0	—		7	4	—		27	14
São Paulo	Total		37	12	14	5	4	0	—		15	5	—		70	22
Career total			154	45	14	6	11	2	6	1	21	6	2	1	208	61

== Honours ==
Individual

- Primeira Liga Goal of the Month: April 2022
- Primeira Liga Goal of the Season: 2021–22
