= Nahuel Ferraresi =

Venezuelan footballer (born 1998)

Personal information
- Full name: Nahuel Adolfo Ferraresi Hernández
- Date of birth: 19 November 1998 (age 27)
- Place of birth: San Cristóbal, Venezuela
- Height: 1.90 m (6 ft 3 in)
- Positions: Centre-back; right-back

Team information
- Current team: Botafogo (on loan from São Paulo)
- Number: 5

Youth career
- 2015–2016: Nueva Chicago

Senior career*
Years	Team	Apps	(Gls)
2017	Deportivo Táchira	0	(0)
2017–2021	Torque	14	(1)
2018–2019	→ Peralada (loan)	29	(2)
2019–2020	→ Porto B (loan)	7	(0)
2020–2021	→ Moreirense (loan)	23	(3)
2021–2023	Manchester City	0	(0)
2021–2022	→ Estoril (loan)	24	(0)
2022–2023	→ São Paulo (loan)	13	(0)
2024–2026	São Paulo	60	(1)
2026	→ Botafogo (loan)	4	(0)
2026–	Botafogo	6	(0)

International career^{‡}
2017	Venezuela U20	9	(1)
2018	Venezuela U21	5	(0)
2018–	Venezuela	47	(1)
Medal record
Representing Venezuela
Men's football
FIFA Series
Runner-up	2026 Uzbekistan
- * Club domestic league appearances and goals as of 21:36, 7 October 2026(UTC) ‡ National team caps and goals as of 22:00, 2 October 2026 (UTC)

Nahuel Adolfo Ferraresi Hernández (born 19 November 1998) is a Venezuelan professional footballer who plays as a centre-back or right-back for Campeonato Brasileiro Série A club Botafogo, on loan from São Paulo, and the Venezuela national team.

== Club career ==
Deportivo Táchira announced on 11 August 2017 that Ferraresi would be joining the City Football Group, initially to Uruguayan Segunda División side Torque, with the plan for him to move to fellow CFG club New York City FC subsequently.

On 26 September 2018, Ferraresi joined CF Peralada on loan and made his debut on 1 October, when he came in as a substitute in a 0–0 draw against Ontinyet.

Ahead of the 2019–20 season, Ferraresi was loaned out to FC Porto B. On 15 August 2020 he went to Moreirense on loan. In the summer of 2021, he joined Estoril on loan.

On 13 August 2022, Ferraresi joined Brazilian club São Paulo on loan until December 2023. On 5 January 2024, he permanently joined the club for a fee of €4.3 millions and signed a three-year contract. On 4 March 2026, he joined Botafogo on loan until the end of year, for a fee of €800 thousand and with the option to join permanently for a €6 millions.

== International career ==
Ferraresi was called up to the Venezuela under-20 side for the 2017 FIFA U-20 World Cup.

== Career statistics ==
=== Club ===
As of match played 7 October 2026

Club	Season	League			State league		Cup		Continental		Total	
Club	Season	Division	Apps	Goals	Apps	Goals	Apps	Goals	Apps	Goals	Apps	Goals
Montevideo City	2017	Uruguayan Segunda División	6	0	—		0	0	0	0	6	0
Montevideo City	2018	Liga AUF Uruguaya	8	1	—		0	0	0	0	8	1
Montevideo City	Total		14	1	—		0	0	0	0	14	1
Peralada	2018–19	Segunda División B	29	2	—		0	0	0	0	29	2
Porto B	2019–20	LigaPro	23	0	—		0	0	0	0	23	0
Moreirense	2020–21	Primeira Liga	23	3	—		0	0	0	0	23	3
Estoril	2021–22	Primeira Liga	24	0	—		1	0	0	0	25	0
São Paulo (loan)	2022	Série A	9	0	0	0	0	0	1 (Note: Appearances in Copa Sudamericana)	0	10	0
São Paulo (loan)	2023	Série A	1	0	3	0	0	0	0	0	4	0
São Paulo (loan)	Total		10	0	3	0	0	1	0	0	14	0
São Paulo	2024	Série A	14	1	6	0	2	0	2 (Note: Appearances in Copa Libertadores)	0	24	1
São Paulo	2025	Série A	24	0	11	0	2	0	9	0	46	0
São Paulo	2026	Série A	2	0	3 (Note: Appearances in Campeonato Paulista)	0	0	0	0	0	5	0
São Paulo	Total		40	1	20	0	4	0	11	0	75	1
Botafogo (loan)	2026	Série A	16	1	0	0	1	0	4	0	21	1
Botafogo	2026	Série A	6	0	—		0	0	1	0	7	0
Career total			185	8	23	0	6	0	17	0	231	8

=== International ===
As of match played 2 October 2026

National team	Year	Apps	Goals
Venezuela	2018	2	0
Venezuela	2019	1	0
Venezuela	2021	10	0
Venezuela	2022	9	1
Venezuela	2023	1	0
Venezuela	2024	10	0
Venezuela	2025	9	0
Venezuela	2026	5	0
Total		47	1

Scores and results list Venezuela's goal tally first, score column indicates score after each Ferraresi goal.

List of international goals scored by Nahuel Ferraresi
No.	Date	Venue	Opponent	Score	Result	Competition
1	9 June 2022	Estadio Enrique Roca de Murcia, Murcia, Spain	Saudi Arabia	1–0	1–0	Friendly

== Personal life ==
Ferraresi's father, Adolfo "Pocho" Ferraresi, is an Argentine professional footballer. His mother, Carmen Hernández, is Venezuelan. Ferraresi's sister, Pierina Ferraresi, is a professional swimmer. Born in Venezuela, Ferraresi grew up in his father's hometown of Marcos Paz, Buenos Aires.

== Honours ==
Montevideo City Torque

- Segunda División: 2017

São Paulo

- Copa do Brasil: 2023
- Supercopa do Brasil: 2024

Venezuela U20

- FIFA U-20 World Cup runner-up: 2017
- South American Youth Football Championship third place: 2017

Venezuela

- Kirin Cup: 2019
- FIFA Series runner-up: 2026
