= Titi (footballer, born 2002) =

Brazilian footballer

Personal information
- Full name: João Pedro Quintino da Silva
- Date of birth: 9 September 2002 (age 24)
- Place of birth: Itatiba, Brazil
- Height: 1.87 m (6 ft 2 in)
- Position: Centre-back

Team information
- Current team: Guarani
- Number: 16

Youth career
- Guarani

Senior career*
Years	Team	Apps	(Gls)
2020–	Guarani	9	(0)
- * Club domestic league appearances and goals as of 26 August 2023

João Pedro Quintino da Silva, known as Titi (born 9 September 2002), is a Brazilian professional footballer who plays as a centre-back for Guarani.
