= Lucca (footballer, born 2007) =

Brazilian footballer (born 2007)

Luccas Marques
Personal information
- Full name: Lucca Marques Alencar
- Date of birth: 14 June 2007 (age 19)
- Place of birth: São Paulo, Brazil
- Height: 1.72 m (5 ft 8 in)
- Position: Winger

Team information
- Current team: São Paulo
- Number: 45

Youth career
- 2017: Ypiranga-SP (futsal)
- 2018–: São Paulo

Senior career*
Years	Team	Apps	(Gls)
2025–	São Paulo	14	(0)

International career
2024	Brazil U17		
- * Club domestic league appearances and goals as of 6 April 2026

Lucca Marques Alencar (born 14 June 2007) is a Brazilian professional footballer who plays as a left winger for Campeonato Brasileiro Série A club São Paulo.

== Career ==
Lucca Marques began his career playing futsal for CA Ypiranga in 2017. In 2018, after failing to be accepted into the Corinthians and Portuguesa academies, he as approved at São Paulo FC and started playing field football, winning the Campeonato Paulista de Futebol Sub-11. He gained greater prominence in 2024, when he was the main player of the team that was runner-up in the U17 Copa do Brasil. He was promoted to the under-20 squad in the second part of the year, and was part of the winning squads of the U20 Copa do Brasil and the Copa São Paulo. In April 2025, Lucca Marques was promoted by coach Luis Zubeldía to the main squad of São Paulo.

Marques made his professional debut on 14 May, against Libertad for the Copa Libertadores group stage. The player scored the equalizing goal in the match that ended 1–1.

== Honours ==
São Paulo U20

- Copa São Paulo de Futebol Jr.: 2025
- Copa do Brasil Sub-20: 2024, 2025

Brazil U17

- Cascais Luso Cup: 2024
