= Isac Silvestre =

Brazilian footballer

Isac
Personal information
- Full name: Isac Silvestre da Silva
- Date of birth: 2 April 2006 (age 20)
- Place of birth: Brejo Santo, Brazil
- Height: 1.92 m (6 ft 4 in)
- Position: Centre-back

Team information
- Current team: São Paulo
- Number: 53

Youth career
- 2022: Sport Recife
- 2022–2025: Red Bull Bragantino
- 2025–: São Paulo

Senior career*
Years	Team	Apps	(Gls)
2024–2025	Red Bull Bragantino	1	(0)
2025–	São Paulo	0	(0)

International career
2023	Brazil U17	1	(0)
- * Club domestic league appearances and goals as of 25 February 2025

Isac Silvestre da Silva (born 2 April 2006), simply known as Isac, is a Brazilian professional footballer who plays as a centre-back for Campeonato Brasileiro Série A club São Paulo.

== Career ==
Having started his career at Sport Recife in 2022, Isac was quickly picked up by Red Bull Bragantino, where he played in the youth sectors until the 2025 Copa São Paulo de Futebol Júnior. He made his professional debut in the match against Guarani, on 10 March 2024. On 25 February 2025, his signing with São Paulo FC was announced, initially to play in the under-20 category.

== International career ==
Isac was part of the 2023 South American U-17 Championship champion squad.

== Honours ==
São Paulo U20

- Copa do Brasil Sub-20: 2025

Brazil U17

- South American U-17 Championship: 2023
