= Matheus Alves (footballer, born 2005) =

Brazilian footballer

Personal information
- Full name: Matheus Alves Nascimento
- Date of birth: 5 March 2005 (age 21)
- Place of birth: São Vicente, Brazil
- Height: 1.79 m (5 ft 10 1/2 in)
- Position: Midfielder

Team information
- Current team: CSKA Moscow
- Number: 7

Youth career
- 2015: Portuários de Santos
- 2016–2025: São Paulo

Senior career*
Years	Team	Apps	(Gls)
2025	São Paulo	10	(0)
2025–	CSKA Moscow	30	(4)
- * Club domestic league appearances and goals as of 21 November 2026

Matheus Alves Nascimento (born 5 March 2005), simply known as Alves or Matheus Alves is a Brazilian professional footballer who plays as a midfielder for Russian Premier League club CSKA Moscow.

== Career ==
Born in São Vicente, São Paulo, Alves began his career at the age of 10 playing for a football school in his city, the CR Tumiaru. After standing out, he became a futsal player for the traditional AA Portuários de Santos. At the age of 12, he arrived at São Paulo FC where he transferred to field football at the age of 13.

Playing for São Paulo's youth sectors, he gained greater prominence in 2024, when he was part of the champion squads of the U19 Dallas Cup and U20 Copa do Brasil.

Alves made his professional debut against Botafogo-SP, on 20 January 2025. On 25 January, Alves became champion of the 2025 Copa São Paulo. After 15 matches played in the professional team of São Paulo FC, Alves was sold for € 6 million to CSKA Moscow on 10 July.

== Honours ==
São Paulo U20

- Copa São Paulo de Futebol Jr.: 2025
- Copa do Brasil Sub-20: 2024
- Dallas Cup U19: 2024

== Career statistics ==
As of 21 November 2026

Appearances and goals by club, season and competition
Club	Season	League			Cup		Continental		Other		Total	
Club	Season	Division	Apps	Goals	Apps	Goals	Apps	Goals	Apps	Goals	Apps	Goals
São Paulo	2025	Campeonato Brasileiro Série A	8	0	1	0	4 (Note: Appearances in Copa Libertadores)	0	2 (Note: Appearances in Campeonato Paulista)	0	15	0
CSKA Moscow	2025–26	Russian Premier League	19	3	8	1	–		0	0	27	4
CSKA Moscow	2026–27	Russian Premier League	11	1	5	0	–		–		16	1
CSKA Moscow	Total		30	4	13	1	0	0	0	0	43	5
Career total			38	4	14	1	4	0	2	0	58	5
