= Santiago Longo =

Brazilian footballer

Personal information
- Full name: Santiago Andrés Longo
- Date of birth: 12 April 1998 (age 28)
- Place of birth: Freyre, Córdoba, Argentina
- Height: 1.77 m (5 ft 10 in)
- Position: Defensive midfielder

Team information
- Current team: Belgrano
- Number: 5

Youth career
- –2019: Belgrano

Senior career*
Years	Team	Apps	(Gls)
2019–	Belgrano	166	(3)
2024–2025	→ São Paulo (loan)	5	(0)
- * Club domestic league appearances and goals as of 17:41, 9 July 2026 (UTC)

Santiago Andrés Longo (born 12 April 1998), known simply as Santi, is an Argentine professional footballer who plays as a defensive midfielder for Belgrano.

== Career ==
Trained in the youth sectors of Club Atlético Belgrano, Longo has played for the club since the 2019 season, still in the Primera Nacional. He accumulated 132 appearances for the team with 3 goals scored.

On 2 September 2024, he signed a loan contract until the end of 2025 with São Paulo FC. On 10 February 2025, the loan agreement was terminated.

== Style of play ==
Defensive midfielder, Longo stands out for his commitment to stealing balls, which guaranteed him the position of captain of CA Belgrano in the 2024 season.

== Honours ==
Belgrano

- Primera Nacional: 2022
- Primera División: 2026 Apertura
