= Ryan Francisco =

Brazilian footballer (born 2006)

Personal information
- Full name: Ryan Francisco Rodrigues dos Santos Silva
- Date of birth: 21 November 2006 (age 19)
- Place of birth: São Paulo, Brazil
- Height: 1.78 m (5 ft 10 in)
- Position: Forward

Team information
- Current team: São Paulo
- Number: 49

Youth career
- 2017–2020: Palmeiras
- 2021–2022: SKA Brasil
- 2022–2025: São Paulo

Senior career*
Years	Team	Apps	(Gls)
2024–	São Paulo	13	(3)

International career^{‡}
2023	Brazil U17	1	(0)
- * Club domestic league appearances and goals as of 14 December 2025 ‡ National team caps and goals as of 6 January 2024

Ryan Francisco Rodrigues dos Santos Silva, simply known as Ryan Francisco (born 21 November 2006) is a Brazilian professional footballer who plays as a forward for Campeonato Brasileiro Série A club São Paulo.

== Club career ==
A youth product of Corinthians, Nacional, and Palmeiras, Francisco first played for the Verdão in the under-11s to under-13s before being released and joining SKA Brasil in Santana de Parnaíba. He signed with Palmeiras' rival São Paulo in 2022, starting in their under-16s and moving towards the under-17s side in 2023. After scoring 18 goals in eight games, aged 16, in the U-17 Campeonato Paulista, Francisco signed his first professional contract with the club, until 2026, in June 2023. He finished the season with 42 goals in 33 appearances across all competitions for the under-17s while coming runners-up in the Campeonato Paulista and Campeonato Brasileiro as both competitions' top goalscorer.

Francisco was promoted to São Paulo's under-20s in November 2023. He was registered for São Paulo's 2024 Libertadores squad in March 2024. He made his professional debut on 8 December 2024, when he entered the final four minutes of the match against Botafogo, in the 38th round of the 2024 Campeonato Brasileiro Série A.

In the Copinha 2025, Ryan Francisco was once again the top scorer, champion and elected the best player of the tournament.

Ryan scored his first professional goal on 29 January 2025, after coming off the bench in a 2–1 Campeonato Paulista away win against Portuguesa, being elected the game's Man of the Match.

== International career ==
In September 2023, Francisco was called up to the Brazil national under-17 team for a series of friendlies against Canada and the United States. He made his debut on 1 October as a substitute in the second friendly match against Canada at the Estádio Novelli Júnior.

== Personal life ==
Francisco was born to Raimundo Alves and his wife Magda, with four siblings. His parents owned a sewing shop when he was growing up. At the age of six, Francisco began playing football, using his parents' sewing as training cones.

== Honours ==
São Paulo U20

- Copa São Paulo de Futebol Jr.: 2025
- Copa do Brasil Sub-20: 2024
- Dallas Cup U19: 2024

Individual

- 2025 Copa São Paulo de Futebol Jr. Player of the Tournament
- 2025 Copa São Paulo de Futebol Jr. top scorer: 10 goals
- 2023 Campeonato Brasileiro Sub-17 top scorer: 14 goals
- 2023 Campeonato Paulista Sub-17 top scorer: 28 goals
