= Julio Casares =

Brazilian creative director and football chairman

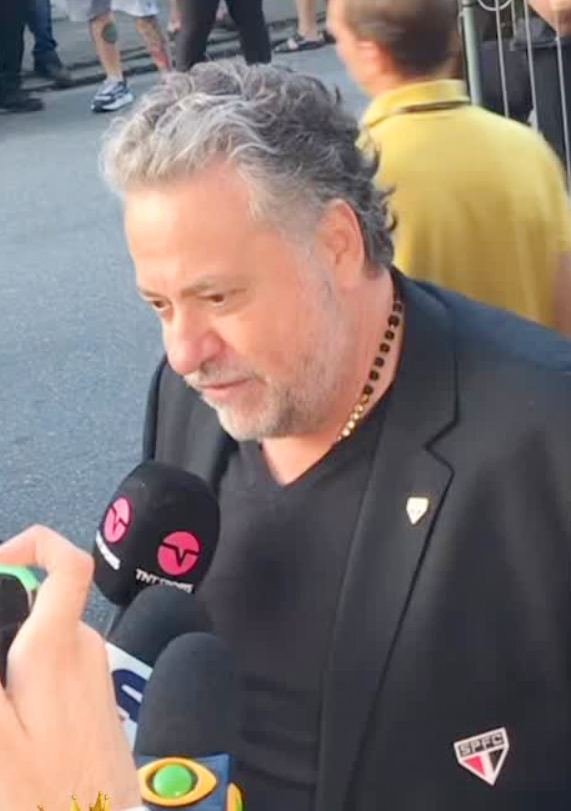
- Casares in 2023
- Born: Julio Cesar Casares; 23 September 1961 (age 64); São Paulo, Brazil
- Occupations: Creative director President of São Paulo FC (2021–2026)
- Years active: 1980s–present

Júlio Casares (born 23 September 1961), is a Brazilian creative director and football chairman.

== Biography ==
Born in the East Zone of the city of São Paulo, Casares graduated in law. He gained prominence by working as creative director at broadcasters SBT and Record, being president for two terms at the Brazilian Association of Marketing and Business (ABMN), and being marketing director at São Paulo FC during the Juvenal Juvêncio tenure (2006–2013). In 2020, Casares himself ended up being elected president of the club, taking over in 2021.

In 2021, Casares was admitted to the ICU for almost a month due to a worsening of COVID-19. In 2023, due to a forced change in the statute, he gained the possibility of re-election, thus having a mandate until 2026.

In 2025, Casares received numerous criticisms due to the substantial increase in the club's debt during his presidency, rising to almost R$ 1 billion, and for negotiating player transfers for values well below market value, such as the transfer of William Gomes to FC Porto. Starting in September, protests against Casares' administration emerged both on social media platforms, such as X, and through chants from the stands. On November 25, the club announced the removal of the match against SC Internacional from the Morumbi Stadium due to fears of protests against Casares.

On 16 January 2026, Casares was suspended from the presidency of São Paulo after impeachment proceedings were initiated. On January 21, he definitively resigned from the presidency, alleging persecution and the exposure of close family members.
