= Pedro Vilhena =

Brazilian footballer (born 2002)

Personal information
- Full name: Pedro Veronez Vilhena
- Date of birth: 18 February 2002 (age 24)
- Place of birth: São Paulo, Brazil
- Height: 1.74 m (5 ft 9 in)
- Position: Attacking midfielder

Team information
- Current team: Operário Ferroviário
- Number: 30

Youth career
- 2011–2023: São Paulo

Senior career*
Years	Team	Apps	(Gls)
2023–2025	São Paulo	1	(0)
2024	→ Sport Recife (loan)	18	(1)
2025	→ Ponte Preta (loan)	8	(0)
2025–	Operário Ferroviário	34	(0)
- * Club domestic league appearances and goals as of 18 November 2026

Pedro Veronez Vilhena (born 18 February 2002), sometimes known as Pedrinho, is a Brazilian professional footballer who plays as an attacking midfielder for Operário Ferroviário.

== Career ==
Born in São Paulo, Vilhena joined São Paulo FC's youth setup at the age of nine. On 12 August 2021, he renewed his contract with the club until 2024, and finished the year impressing with the under-20s.

Vilhena started the 2022 season with the expectation to break into the first team, but spent the majority of the year nursing a knee injury. Back to action in September, he returned to the under-20 squad.

Vilhena made his professional – and Série A – debut with Tricolor on 20 September 2023, coming on as a second-half substitute for Michel Araújo in a 2–1 home loss to Fortaleza. On 2 January of the following year, he was loaned to Série B side Sport Recife. On 17 December 2024 Vilhena was loaned again, this time to AA Ponte Preta.

On 1 September 2025, Vilhena, who had not been used, consensually terminated his contract with São Paulo and signed a contract until the end of 2026 with Operário Ferroviário EC from Ponta Grossa, after being recommended by his coach at São Paulo's under-20 time, Alex.

== Career statistics ==
As of 3 January 2024

Club	Season	League			State League		Cup		Continental		Other		Total	
Club	Season	Division	Apps	Goals	Apps	Goals	Apps	Goals	Apps	Goals	Apps	Goals	Apps	Goals
São Paulo	2023	Série A	1	0	—		0	0	0	0	—		1	0
Sport Recife (loan)	2024	Série B	0	0	0	0	0	0	—		—		0	0
Career total			1	0	0	0	0	0	0	0	0	0	1	0

== Honours ==
São Paulo

- Copa do Brasil: 2023

Sport

- Campeonato Pernambucano: 2024
