= Léo Silva (footballer, born 2003) =

Brazilian footballer (born 2003)

Personal information
- Full name: Leonardo de Almeida Silva
- Date of birth: 18 January 2003 (age 23)
- Place of birth: São Paulo, Brazil
- Height: 1.71 m (5 ft 7 in)
- Position: Defensive midfielder

Team information
- Current team: Sioni Bolnisi

Youth career
- 2016–2023: São Paulo

Senior career*
Years	Team	Apps	(Gls)
2022–2024	São Paulo	1	(0)
2023	→ CRB (loan)	3	(0)
2024	→ Volta Redonda (loan)	11	(0)
2025	Paraná	10	(0)
2025	Operário Ferroviário	6	(0)
2026–	Sioni Bolnisi	20	(1)
- * Club domestic league appearances and goals as of 9 September 2026

Leonardo de Almeida Silva (born 18 January 2003), known professionally as Léo Silva, is a Brazilian professional footballer who plays as a defensive midfielder for Sioni Bolnisi.

== Career ==
Formed in the youth categories of São Paulo FC, Léo Silva stood out for his performance in the 2022 Copa São Paulo de Futebol Jr. He made his professional debut on 25 May 2022, in a match against Ayacucho in the 2022 Copa Sudamericana. Originally a defensive midfielder very mobile, Léo Silva played as right back in this match.

Without receiving many opportunities in the professional squad, in April 2023 he was loaned to CRB, where he played on three occasions in the 2023 Campeonato Brasileiro Série B. In December, he had a loan confirmed again, this time to Volta Redonda.

In January 2025, after his contract with São Paulo ended, Silva signed with Paraná Clube. In July 2025, Silva signed with Operário Ferroviário, after being recommended by his coach at São Paulo's under-20 time, Alex.

== Honours ==
São Paulo (youth)

- Copa do Brasil Sub-17: 2020
- Supercopa do Brasil Sub-17: 2020
