= 2026 Coritiba Foot Ball Club season =

Coritiba
2026 season
- Manager: Fernando Seabra (until 27 October); Guila Bossle (from 30 October)
- Stadium: Estádio Couto Pereira
- Campeonato Brasileiro Série A: 11th
- Campeonato Paranaense: Quarter-finals
- Copa do Brasil: Fifth round
- Top goalscorer: League: Breno Lopes; Pedro Rocha (9); All: Pedro Rocha (12)

During its 117th season in 2026, Coritiba Foot Ball Club returns to the Campeonato Brasileiro Série A for the first time since 2023 and also competes in the Campeonato Paranaense and the Copa do Brasil.

== Transfers ==
=== In ===
Pos.	Player	Transferred from	Fee	Date	Source
MF	(Brazil) Wallisson	(Portugal) Moreirense		6 December 2025	
FW	(Brazil) Pedro Rocha	(Brazil) Remo		11 December 2025	
MF	(Brazil) Willian Oliveira	(Brazil) Vitória		13 December 2025	
DF	(Brazil) Tinga	(Brazil) Fortaleza		23 December 2025	
DF	(Brazil) Maicon	(Brazil) Vasco da Gama	Free	4 January 2026	
MF	(Brazil) Gustavo	(United Arab Emirates) Shabab Al Ahli	Undisclosed	7 January 2026	
MF	(Uruguay) Joaquín Lavega	(Brazil) Fluminense	Loan	8 January 2026	
DF	(Brazil) Thiago Santos	(Brazil) Fluminense		10 January 2026	
MF	(Brazil) Breno Lopes	(Brazil) Fortaleza	R$15 million	15 January 2026	
DF	(Brazil) Felipe Jonatan	(Brazil) Fortaleza	Free	16 February 2026	
FW	(Brazil) Renato Marques	(Brazil) Mirassol	Loan	25 March 2026	
MF	(Uruguay) Brian Ocampo	(Spain) Cádiz	Free	3 July 2026	
DF	(Brazil) Rodrigo Gelado	(Brazil) Athletic Club	Loan return	3 September 2026	
MF	(Uruguay) Nicolás Fonseca	(Mexico) Club León	Loan	10 September 2026	
DF	(Argentina) Fabricio Bustos	(Argentina) River Plate	Free	16 September 2026	

=== Out ===
Pos.	Player	Transferred to	Fee	Date	Source
FW	(Brazil) Dellatorre	(Brazil) Vila Nova	Free	3 December 2025	
MF	(Brazil) Everaldo	(Brazil) Santa Cruz		4 December 2025	
MF	(Brazil) Nicolas Careca	(Brazil) Novorizontino	Undisclosed	25 December 2025	
FW	(Brazil) Gustavo Coutinho	(Brazil) Sport Recife	Loan return	31 December 2025	
MF	(Brazil) Filipe Machado	(Brazil) Vitória	Loan return	31 December 2025	
DF	(Brazil) Alex Silva	(Brazil) Ceará	Free	1 January 2026	
MF	(Brazil) Geovane	(Brazil) Atlético Goianiense	Free	1 January 2026	
DF	(Brazil) Zeca	(Brazil) Athletic Club	Free	13 January 2026	
DF	(Brazil) Guilherme Aquino	(Brazil) Avaí	Loan	20 January 2026	
MF	(Uruguay) Carlos de Pena	(Brazil) Sport Recife	Free	26 January 2026	
MF	(Brazil) Clayson	(Brazil) Sport Recife	Free	29 January 2026	
FW	(Brazil) Iury Castilho	(Brazil) Sport Recife	Loan	30 January 2026	
MF	(Brazil) Jean Gabriel	(Brazil) Figueirense	Loan	24 March 2026	
DF	(Brazil) Felipe Guimarães	(Brazil) Atlético Goianiense	Loan	27 March 2026	
GK	(Brazil) Gabriel Leite		End of contract	1 July 2026	
FW	(Brazil) Iury Castilho	(Japan) Albirex Niigata	Loan	1 August 2026	
MF	(Brazil) Wallisson	(Brazil) Mirassol	Undisclosed	1 August 2026	
DF	(Brazil) João Almeida	(France) Le Mans	Loan	7 September 2026	

== Competitions ==
=== Overall record ===
Competition	First match	Last match	Starting round	Final position	Record							
Competition	First match	Last match	Starting round	Final position	Pld	W	D	L	GF	GA	GD	Win %
Campeonato Brasileiro Série A	28 January 2026		Matchday 1		36	12	9	15	41	52	−11	33.33
Campeonato Paranaense	7 January 2026	21 February 2026			0	0	0	0	0	0	+0	—
Copa do Brasil	22 April 2026	13 May 2026	Fifth round	Fifth round	2	0	1	1	0	2	−2	0.00
Total					38	12	10	16	41	54	−13	31.58

Last updated: 21 November 2026
Source: Competitions

=== Campeonato Brasileiro Série A ===
The competition schedule was released on 16 December 2025.

Pos	Team	Pld	W	D	L	GF	GA	GD	Pts	Qualification or relegation
9	Red Bull Bragantino	35	13	8	14	45	41	+4	47	Qualification for Copa Sudamericana group stage
10	Vasco da Gama	35	13	8	14	47	51	−4	47	Qualification for Copa Sudamericana group stage
11	Coritiba	36	12	9	15	41	52	−11	45	Qualification for Copa Sudamericana group stage
12	São Paulo	35	12	8	15	39	40	−1	44	Qualification for Copa Sudamericana group stage
13	Botafogo	35	11	9	15	46	57	−11	42	

Updated to match(es) played on 21 November 2026. Source: CBF
Rules for classification: 1) points; 2) wins; 3) goal difference; 4) goals scored; 5) head-to-head results (only between two teams); 6) fewest red cards; 7) fewest yellow cards; 8) drawing of lots.

==== Results by round ====
Round	1	2	3	4	5	6	7	8	9	10	11	12	13	14	15	16	17	18	19	20	21	22	23	24	25	26	27	28	29	30	31	32	33	34	35	36
Ground	H	A	A	H	A	H	A	A	H	H	A	H	A	A	H	A	H	A	H	A	H	H	A	H	A	H	H	A	A	H	A	H	H	A	H	A
Result	L	W	D	L	W	W	W	L	D	D	D	W	L	L	D	W	W	L	L	D	L	W	D	W	W	L	D	L	L	D	L	L	W	L	L	W
Position	16	10	10	13	8	7	7	7	7	7	7	7	7	8	9	8	7	7	10	10	11	11	11	9	8	8	9	9	9	11	12	13	11	13		
Points	0	3	4	4	7	10	13	13	14	15	16	19	19	19	20	23	26	26	26	27	27	30	31	34	37	37	38	38	38	39	39	39	42	42	42	45

Updated to match(es) played on 21 November 2026. Source:
A = Away; H = Home; W = Win; D = Draw; L = Loss

==== Matches ====
28 January 2026 1	Coritiba	0–1	Red Bull Bragantino	Curitiba
19:00			Juninho Capixaba 90+3'	Stadium: Estádio Couto Pereira

5 February 2026 2	Cruzeiro	1–2	Coritiba
21:30	Matheus Pereira 19'		Lavega 45'; Breno 53'

11 February 2026 3	Chapecoense	3–3	Coritiba
19:00	Clar 45'; Doma 71'; Rubens 90+1'		Breno 41', 57'; Pedro Rocha 59'

25 February 2026 4	Coritiba	0–1	São Paulo	Curitiba
19:30			Cauly 57' (pen.)	Stadium: Estádio Couto Pereira

11 March 2026 5	Corinthians	0–2	Coritiba
21:30			Jacy 37'; Ronier 54'

15 March 2026 6	Coritiba	1–0	Remo	Curitiba
18:30	Pedro Rocha 24'			Stadium: Estádio Couto Pereira

18 March 2026 7	Mirassol	0–1	Coritiba
20:00			Lavega 64'

22 March 2026 8	Athletico Paranaense	2–0	Coritiba	Curitiba
16:00	Dudu 22'; Viveros 56'		Maicon (red card) 90+4'

1 April 2026 9	Coritiba	1–1	Vasco da Gama	Curitiba
20:30	Saldivia 90' (o.g.)		Tchê Tchê 24'	Stadium: Estádio Couto Pereira

4 April 2026 10	Coritiba	1–1	Fluminense	Curitiba
20:30	Tiago 74'		Cabral 81'	Stadium: Estádio Couto Pereira

12 April 2026 11	Botafogo	2–2	Coritiba
16:00	Danilo 55'; Cabral 77'		Breno 33'; Lavega 79'

19 April 2026 12	Coritiba	2–0	Atlético Mineiro	Curitiba
16:00	Breno 7'; Pedro Rocha 58'			Stadium: Estádio Couto Pereira; Referee: Fernando Antonio Mendes

26 April 2026 13	Grêmio	1–0	Coritiba	Porto Alegre
16:00	Mec 43'		Bruno Melo (red card) 30'; Jacy (red card) 90+8'	Stadium: Arena do Grêmio; Referee: Felipe Fernandes de Lima

2 May 2026 14	Vitória	4–1	Coritiba	Salvador
18:30				Stadium: Barradão

9 May 2026 15	Coritiba	2–2	Internacional	Curitiba
16:00				Stadium: Estádio Couto Pereira; Referee: Wagner do Nascimento Magalhães

17 May 2026 16	Santos	0–3	Coritiba	Santos
11:00	Escobar (yellow card) 37'; Barreal (red card) 73'; Gabriel Barbosa (yellow card) 90+3'; João Ananias (yellow card) 90+5'		Breno Lopes 6', 20'; Taverna (yellow card) 16'; Josue 39' (pen.), (yellow card) 84'	Stadium: Vila Belmiro; Referee: Paulo César Zanovelli da Silva

25 May 2026 17	Coritiba	3–2	Bahia	Curitiba
20:00 UTC−3	Bruno Melo 56'; Lavega 65'; Breno Lopes 68'		Cóser 26' (o.g.); Acevedo (yellow card) 30'; Ademir (yellow card) 76'; Gómez (yellow card) 90'; Everaldo 90+1'	Stadium: Estádio Couto Pereira; Referee: Anderson Daronco

30 May 2026 18	Flamengo	3–0	Coritiba	Rio de Janeiro
16:00				Stadium: Maracanã; Referee: Flávio Rodrigues de Souza

22 July 2026 19	Coritiba	1–3	Palmeiras	Curitiba
19:30

26 July 2026 20	Red Bull Bragantino	0–0	Coritiba
18:30

30 July 2026 21	Coritiba	0–1	Cruzeiro	Curitiba
21:30

8 August 2026 22	Coritiba	2–1	Chapecoense	Curitiba
20:30

15 August 2026 23	São Paulo	1–1	Coritiba
21:00

23 August 2026 24	Coritiba	2–1	Corinthians	Curitiba
19:30

31 August 2026 25	Remo	2–3	Coritiba
20:00

6 September 2026 26	Coritiba	1–2	Mirassol	Curitiba
11:00

11 September 2026 27	Coritiba	3–3	Athletico Paranaense	Curitiba
21:00

19 September 2026 28	Vasco da Gama	5–0	Coritiba
20:30

8 October 2026 29	Fluminense	4–0	Coritiba
21:30

12 October 2026 30	Coritiba	1–1	Botafogo	Curitiba
16:00

17 October 2026 31	Atlético Mineiro	1–0	Coritiba	Belo Horizonte
18:30

26 October 2026 32	Coritiba	0–1	Grêmio	Curitiba
19:30 UTC−3				Stadium: Estádio Couto Pereira

31 October 2026 33	Coritiba	2–0	Vitória	Curitiba
16:00 UTC−3				Stadium: Estádio Couto Pereira

3 November 2026 34	Internacional	1–0	Coritiba	Porto Alegre
21:30 UTC−3

18 November 2026 35	Coritiba	0–1	Santos	Curitiba
19:30 UTC−3	Thiago dos Santos (yellow card) 14'; Fonseca (yellow card) 42'; Gómez (yellow card) 51'; Jacy (yellow card) 90+4'; Ocampo (yellow card) 90+9'		Rodinei (yellow card) 61'; Gustavo Henrique (yellow card) 80'; Gabriel Barbosa 90+4'	Stadium: Estádio Couto Pereira; Referee: Bráulio da Silva Machado

21 November 2026 36	Bahia	0–1	Coritiba	Salvador
17:30 UTC−3			Breno Lopes 74'

=== Campeonato Paranaense ===
7 January 2026 1	Coritiba	2–3	Foz do Iguaçu
20:30

10 January 2026 2	Coritiba	2–2	Londrina
18:30

13 January 2026 3	Maringá	0–1	Coritiba
20:00

17 January 2026 4	Athletico Paranaense	0–1	Coritiba
16:00

21 January 2026 5	Coritiba	0–1	Independente
20:30

24 January 2026 6	Cascavel	1–1	Coritiba
16:00

==== Quarter-finals ====
31 January 2026 First leg	Cianorte	0–1	Coritiba
16:00

8 February 2026 Second leg	Coritiba	2–0 (3–0 agg.)	Cianorte
18:30

==== Quarter-finals ====
14 February 2026 First leg	Operário Ferroviário	2–2	Coritiba
16:00

21 February 2026 Second leg	Coritiba	2–2 (4–4 agg.) (5–6 p)	Operário Ferroviário
16:00

=== Copa do Brasil ===
==== Fifth round ====
22 April 2026 First leg	Santos	0–0	Coritiba	Santos
19:30				Stadium: Vila Belmiro; Referee: Bruno Arleu de Araújo

13 May 2026 Second leg	Coritiba	0–2 (0–2 agg.)	Santos	Curitiba
19:30			Bontempo 20'; Frías 28'	Stadium: Estádio Couto Pereira; Referee: Ramon Abatti
