= 2022 Grêmio FBPA season =

Grêmio
2022 season
- President: Romildo Bolzan Jr.
- Manager: Vagner Mancini (until 14 February); Roger Machado (from 14 February – until 1 September); Renato Portaluppi (since 1 September)
- Stadium: Arena do Grêmio
- Campeonato Brasileiro Série B: 2nd
- Campeonato Gaúcho: Winners
- Copa do Brasil: First round
- Recopa Gaúcha: Winners
Home colours	Away colours	Third colours

The 2022 season was Grêmio Foot-Ball Porto Alegrense's 119th season in existence and the club's. In addition to the Campeonato Brasileiro Série B, Grêmio participates in this season's editions of the Copa do Brasil, the Campeonato Gaúcho, and the Recopa Gaúcha. The season covers the period from 26 January 2022 to 6 November 2022, a shorter season due to the 2022 FIFA World Cup.

== Squad information ==
=== First team squad ===
As of 14 July 2022.

Note: Flags indicate national team as defined under FIFA eligibility rules; some limited exceptions apply. Players may hold more than one non-FIFA nationality.

No.	Pos.	Nation	Player
1	GK	BRA	Brenno
3	DF	BRA	Pedro Geromel (captain)
4	DF	ARG	Walter Kannemann (vice-captain)
5	MF	BRA	Thiago Santos
6	DF	BRA	Diogo Barbosa
7	MF	COL	Jaminton Campaz
9	FW	CHN	Elkeson
10	FW	BRA	Ferreira
11	FW	BRA	Guilherme
12	GK	BRA	Gabriel Grando
14	MF	BRA	Pedro Lucas
15	MF	BRA	Lucas Leiva
16	MF	BRA	Lucas Silva
17	FW	BRA	Biel (on loan from Fluminense)
18	FW	BRA	Elias Manoel
20	FW	BRA	Janderson (on loan from Corinthians)
22	DF	BRA	Rodrigo Ferreira (on loan from Mirassol)
25	FW	BRA	Jhonata Robert

No.	Pos.	Nation	Player
26	DF	BRA	Rodrigues
27	MF	PAR	Mathías Villasanti
29	FW	BRA	Diego Souza
30	DF	BRA	Nicolas (on loan from Athletico Paranaense)
31	GK	BRA	Adriel
33	DF	BRA	Edílson
34	DF	BRA	Bruno Alves (on loan from São Paulo)
36	DF	BRA	Natã
39	MF	BRA	Bitello
41	GK	BRA	Felipe Scheibig
42	MF	BRA	Fernando Henrique
43	MF	BRA	Jhonata Varela
46	FW	BRA	Emerson
48	MF	BRA	Sarará
55	MF	BRA	Michel
59	MF	BRA	Gabriel Silva
—	GK	BRA	Hugo (on loan from Mirassol)
—	MF	BRA	Thaciano

== Competitions ==
=== Overview ===
Competition	First match	Last match	Starting round	Final position	Record							
Competition	First match	Last match	Starting round	Final position	Pld	W	D	L	GF	GA	GD	Win %
Campeonato Brasileiro Série B	9 April	3 November	Matchday 1	Runners-up	38	17	14	7	50	26	+24	44.74
Campeonato Gaúcho	26 January	2 April	First stage	Winners	15	9	3	3	24	12	+12	60.00
Copa do Brasil	1 March		First round	First round	1	0	0	1	2	3	−1	0.00
Recopa Gaúcha	24 May		Final	Winners	1	1	0	0	5	0	+5	100.00
Total					55	27	17	11	81	41	+40	49.09

Source: Soccerway

=== Recopa Gaúcha ===
24 May Final	Glória	0–5	Grêmio	Vacaria
19:00 UTC−3		Report	Elkeson 7'; Campaz 45'; Janderson 63'; Jhonata Varela 68'; Ricardinho 80'	Stadium: Estádio Altos da Glória; Referee: Roger Goulart

=== Campeonato Gaúcho ===
==== Results summary ====
Overall								Home						Away					
Pld	W	D	L	GF	GA	GD	Pts	W	D	L	GF	GA	GD	W	D	L	GF	GA	GD
11	6	3	2	18	10	+8	21	5	1	0	13	3	+10	1	2	2	5	7	−2

Source: Soccerway

==== First stage ====
===== Table =====
Pos	Team	Pld	W	D	L	GF	GA	GD	Pts	Qualification or relegation
1	Ypiranga-RS	11	6	3	2	17	8	+9	21	Qualification to Knockout stage
2	Grêmio	11	6	3	2	18	10	+8	21	Qualification to Knockout stage
3	Internacional	11	5	4	2	13	10	+3	19	Qualification to Knockout stage
4	Brasil (PE)	11	3	7	1	12	11	+1	16	Qualification to Knockout stage
5	Caxias	11	4	3	4	15	9	+6	15	

Updated to match(es) played on unknown. Source: Soccerway
Rules for classification: 1) Points; 2) Wins; 3) Goal difference; 4) Goals scored; 5) fewest red cards; 6) fewest yellow cards; 7) Draw in the headquarters of the FGF.

===== Results by matchday =====
Matchday	1	2	3	4	5	6	7	8	9	10	11
Ground	H	A	H	H	A	H	A	H	A (Note: Matchday 9 vs. Internacional postponed until Matchday 10.)	A	H
Result	W	D	W	W	W	D	L	W	L	D	W
Position	1	2	2	1	1	1	2	1	2	2	2

Source: Soccerway
A = Away; H = Home; W = Win; D = Draw; L = Loss

===== Matches =====
The first stage fixtures were announced on 25 November 2021.

Note: Match numbers indicated on the left hand side are references to the matchday scheduled by the Campeonato Gaúcho and not the order matches were played after postponements and rescheduled matches.

26 January 1	Grêmio	2–1	Caxias	Porto Alegre
19:00 UTC−3	Elias Manoel 32', 54' (pen.)	Report	França 74'	Stadium: Arena do Grêmio; Referee: Leandro Pedro Vuaden

29 January 2	Brasil (PE)	1–1	Grêmio	Pelotas
16:30 UTC−3	Paulo Victor 86'	Report	Elias Manoel 48' (pen.)	Stadium: Estádio Bento Freitas; Referee: Rafael Rodrigo Klein

2 February 3	Grêmio	2–1	São José-RS	Porto Alegre
16:30 UTC−3	Jaminton Campaz 6'; Diego Souza 65'	Report	Bruno Jesus 48'	Stadium: Arena do Grêmio; Referee: Érico Andrade de Carvalho

6 February 4	Grêmio	2–0	Guarany de Bagé	Porto Alegre
19:30 UTC−3	Janderson 3'; Diego Souza 60'	Report		Stadium: Arena do Grêmio; Referee: Rodrigo Brand da Silva

9 February 5	Aimoré	1–2	Grêmio	São Leopoldo
20:00 UTC−3	Mathías Villasanti 78'; Rodrigues 87'	Report	Wesley 60'	Stadium: Estádio Cristo Rei; Referee: Roger Goulart

13 February 6	Grêmio	1–1	Juventude	Porto Alegre
19:00 UTC−3	Nicolas 90'	Report	Capixaba 81'	Stadium: Arena do Grêmio; Referee: Daniel Nobre Bins

16 February 7	União Frederiquense	3–1	Grêmio	Frederico Westphalen
19:00 UTC−3	Jander 25'; Eliomar 47'; Laion 70'	Report	Elias Manoel 29' (pen.)	Stadium: Estádio Vermelhão da Colina; Referee: Lucas Guimarães Rechatiko Horn

19 February 8	Grêmio	4–0	São Luiz	Porto Alegre
16:30 UTC−3	Diego Souza 11'; Rildo 36'; Nicolas 63'; Janderson 78' (pen.)	Report		Stadium: Arena do Grêmio; Referee: Anderson da Silveira Farias

5 March 10	Novo Hamburgo	1–1	Grêmio	Novo Hamburgo
16:30 UTC−3	Rondinelli 27'	Report	Gabriel Silva 85'	Stadium: Estádio do Vale; Referee: Jean Pierre Gonçalves Lima

9 March 9	Internacional	1–0	Grêmio	Porto Alegre
19:00 UTC−3	David 45+2'	Report		Stadium: Beira-Rio; Referee: Leandro Vuaden
Note: The match was originally supposed to take place on 26 February at 19:00, but was postponed due to the fact that the Grêmio bus was stoned by Internacional fans.

12 March 11	Grêmio	2–0	Ypiranga-RS	Porto Alegre
16:30 UTC−3	Jaminton Campaz 26'; Bitello 64'	Report		Stadium: Arena do Grêmio; Referee: Érico Andrade de Carvalho

==== Knockout stage ====
===== Semi-finals =====
19 March First leg	Internacional	0–3	Grêmio	Porto Alegre
16:30 UTC−3		Report	Elias Manoel 11'; Bitello 23'; Diego Souza 72' (pen.)	Stadium: Estádio Beira-Rio; Referee: Jean Pierre Gonçalves Lima

23 March Second leg	Grêmio	0–1 (3–1 agg.)	Internacional	Porto Alegre
22:15 UTC−3		Report	Taison 64'	Stadium: Arena do Grêmio; Referee: Leandro Vuaden

===== Finals =====
26 March First leg	Ypiranga-RS	0–1	Grêmio	Erechim
16:30 UTC−3		Report	Lucas Silva 90+3' (pen.)	Stadium: Colosso da Lagoa; Referee: Anderson Daronco

2 April Second leg	Grêmio	2–1 (3–1 agg.)	Ypiranga-RS	Porto Alegre
16:30 UTC−3	B. Alves 45+1'; Rodrigues 76'	Report	Erick 79'	Stadium: Arena do Grêmio; Referee: Leandro Vuaden

=== Campeonato Brasileiro Série B ===
==== League table ====
Pos	Team	Pld	W	D	L	GF	GA	GD	Pts	Promotion or relegation
1	Cruzeiro (C, P)	38	23	9	6	57	26	+31	78	Promotion to 2023 Campeonato Brasileiro Série A
2	Grêmio (P)	38	17	14	7	50	26	+24	65	Promotion to 2023 Campeonato Brasileiro Série A
3	Bahia (P)	38	17	11	10	43	29	+14	62	Promotion to 2023 Campeonato Brasileiro Série A
4	Vasco da Gama (P)	38	17	11	10	48	36	+12	62	Promotion to 2023 Campeonato Brasileiro Série A
5	Sampaio Corrêa	38	16	10	12	48	42	+6	58	

Source: CBF
Rules for classification: 1) points; 2) wins; 3) goal difference; 4) goals scored; 5) head-to-head results (only between 2 teams); 6) fewest red cards; 7) fewest yellow cards; 8) drawing of lots.
(C) Champions; (P) Promoted

==== Results summary ====
Overall								Home						Away					
Pld	W	D	L	GF	GA	GD	Pts	W	D	L	GF	GA	GD	W	D	L	GF	GA	GD
38	17	14	7	50	26	+24	65	14	3	2	37	10	+27	3	11	5	13	16	−3

Source: Soccerway

==== Results by matchday ====
Matchday	1	2	3	4	5	6	7	8	9	10	11	12	13	14	15	16	17	18	19	20	21	22	23	24	25	26	27	28	29	30	31	32	33	34	35	36	37	38
Ground	A	H	H	A	H	A	A	H	A	A	H	A	H	A	H	A	H	H	A	H	A	A	H	A	H	H	A	H	H	A	H	A	H	A	H	A	A	H
Result	D	L	W	W	W	L	D	D	D	D	W	D	W	D	W	D	W	W	D	W	D	W	W	L	D	L	L	W	W	L	W	L	W	D	D	W	D	W
Position	12	17	6	4	1	4	6	6	5	5	5	5	4	4	4	4	4	4	4	2	4	3	2	3	3	3	4	3	3	3	2	2	2	2	2	2	2	2

Source: Confederação Brasileira de Futebol
A = Away; H = Home; W = Win; D = Draw; L = Loss; P = Postponed

==== Matches ====
The league fixtures were announced on 3 February 2022.

9 April 1	Ponte Preta	0–0	Grêmio	Campinas
16:30 UTC−3		Report		Stadium: Estádio Moisés Lucarelli; Attendance: 5,205; Referee: Paulo Roberto Alves Júnior

15 April 2	Grêmio	0–1	Chapecoense	Porto Alegre
19:00 UTC−3		Report	Matheus Bianqui 75'	Stadium: Arena do Grêmio; Attendance: 23,500; Referee: Edina Alves Batista

21 April 3	Grêmio	3–1	Guarani	Porto Alegre
16:30 UTC−3	Diego Souza 2', 40', 60'	Report	Matheus Pereira 26'	Stadium: Arena do Grêmio; Attendance: 22,649; Referee: André Castro

27 April 4	Operário	0–1	Grêmio	Ponta Grossa
19:00 UTC−3		Report	Elias Manoel 53'	Stadium: Estádio Germano Krüger; Attendance: 6,521; Referee: Flávio Rodrigues de Souza

30 April 5	Grêmio	2–0	CRB	Porto Alegre
16:30 UTC−3	Elias Manoel 14'; Diogo Silva 40' (o.g.)	Report		Stadium: Arena do Grêmio; Referee: Felipe Fernandes de Lima

8 May 6	Cruzeiro	1–0	Grêmio	Belo Horizonte
16:00 UTC−3	Rodrigo Ferreira 27' (o.g.)	Report		Stadium: Independência; Attendance: 21,831; Referee: Flávio Rodrigues de Souza

16 May 7	Ituano	1–1	Grêmio	Itu
20:00 UTC−3	Lucas Nathan 90+3'	Report	Diego Souza 48'	Stadium: Estádio Novelli Júnior; Attendance: 5,460; Referee: Flávio Rodrigues de Souza

19 May 8	Grêmio	0–0	Criciúma	Porto Alegre
19:00 UTC−3		Report		Stadium: Arena do Grêmio; Attendance: 10,824; Referee: Wilton Pereira Sampaio

29 May 9	Vila Nova	0–0	Grêmio	Goiânia
16:00 UTC−3		Report		Stadium: Serra Dourada; Referee: Douglas Marques das Flores

2 June 10	Vasco	0–0	Grêmio	Rio de Janeiro
20:00 UTC−3		Report		Stadium: São Januário; Attendance: 21,075; Referee: Luiz Flávio de Oliveira

7 June 11	Grêmio	2–0	Novorizontino	Porto Alegre
21:30 UTC−3	Diego Souza 45+9' (pen.); Janderson 58'	Report		Stadium: Arena do Grêmio; Attendance: 12,357; Referee: Sávio Pereira Sampaio

13 June 12	Sport	0–0	Grêmio	São Lourenço da Mata
20:00 UTC−3		Report		Stadium: Arena Pernambuco; Attendance: 16,506; Referee: Wilton Pereira Sampaio

18 June 13	Grêmio	2–0	Sampaio Corrêa	Porto Alegre
11:00 UTC−3	Diego Souza 36', 77' (pen.)	Report		Stadium: Arena do Grêmio; Attendance: 30,767; Referee: André Luiz de Freitas Castro

23 June 14	CSA	1–1	Grêmio	Maceió
21:30 UTC−3	Geovane 13'	Report	Janderson 46'	Stadium: Estádio Rei Pelé; Referee: Ramon Abatti Abel

28 June 15	Grêmio	1–0	Londrina	Porto Alegre
19:00 UTC−3	Gabriel Teixeira 14'	Report		Stadium: Arena do Grêmio; Attendance: 11,791; Referee: Marielson Alves Silva

3 July 16	Bahia	0–0	Grêmio	Salvador
16:00 UTC−3		Report		Stadium: Arena Fonte Nova; Attendance: 42,466; Referee: Raphael Claus

8 July 17	Grêmio	2–0	Náutico	Porto Alegre
21:30 UTC−3	Ferreira 43'; Bruno Alves 78'	Report		Stadium: Arena do Grêmio; Attendance: 23,879; Referee: Bráulio da Silva Machado

16 July 18	Grêmio	3–0	Tombense	Porto Alegre
16:30 UTC−3	Diego Souza 14' (pen.), 45' (pen.); Bitello 32'	Report		Stadium: Arena do Grêmio; Attendance: 24,093; Referee: Marcelo de Lima Henrique

19 July 19	Brusque	1–1	Grêmio	Brusque
19:00 UTC−3	Wallace 54'	Report	Bitello 49'	Stadium: Estádio Augusto Bauer; Attendance: 5,603; Referee: Luiz Flávio de Oliveira

23 July 20	Grêmio	2–1	Ponte Preta	Porto Alegre
16:30 UTC−3	Diego Souza 10'; Campaz 25'	Report	Wallisson Luiz 25'	Stadium: Arena do Grêmio; Attendance: 43,687; Referee: Paulo César Zanovelli

26 July 21	Chapecoense	0–0	Grêmio	Chapecó
18:30 UTC−3		Report		Stadium: Arena Condá; Attendance: 11,302; Referee: Paulo Roberto Alves Júnior

5 August 22	Guarani	1–2	Grêmio	Campinas
21:30 UTC−3	João Victor 90+5'	Report	Villasanti 19'; Gabriel Teixeira 75'	Stadium: Estádio Brinco de Ouro; Referee: Sávio Pereira Sampaio

9 August 23	Grêmio	5–1	Operário	Porto Alegre
19:00 UTC−3	Campaz 45+1'; Diego Souza 52'; Gabriel Teixeira 63'; Elkeson 90'; Reniê 90+3' (o.g.)	Report	Leonardo Kalil 55'	Stadium: Arena do Grêmio; Attendance: 11,367; Referee: Bruno Arleu de Araújo

13 August 24	CRB	2–0	Grêmio	Maceió
20:30 UTC−3	Diogo Silva 8' (pen.), 37' (pen.)	Report		Stadium: Estádio Rei Pelé; Referee: Vinícius Gonçalves Dias Araújo

21 August 25	Grêmio	2–2	Cruzeiro	Porto Alegre
16:00 UTC−3	Diego Souza 45+3'; Bitello 46'	Report	Henrique Luvannor 17'; Rafael Silva 73'	Stadium: Arena do Grêmio; Attendance: 51,618; Referee: Bráulio da Silva Machado

26 August 26	Grêmio	0–1	Ituano	Porto Alegre
19:00 UTC−3		Report	Lucas Dias 87'	Stadium: Arena do Grêmio; Referee: André Luiz de Freitas Castro

30 August 27	Criciúma	2–0	Grêmio	Criciúma
20:30 UTC−3	Caio Dantas 12'; Rafael Bilú 86' (pen.)	Report		Stadium: Estádio Heriberto Hülse; Attendance: 17,682; Referee: Marcelo de Lima Henrique

2 September 28	Grêmio	2–1	Vila Nova	Porto Alegre
21:30 UTC−3	Gabriel Teixeira 3'; Thaciano 63'	Report	Matheuzinho 78'	Stadium: Arena do Grêmio; Attendance: 13,775; Referee: Sávio Pereira Sampaio

11 September 29	Grêmio	2–1	Vasco	Porto Alegre
16:00 UTC−3	Bitello 10'; Thaciano 20'	Report	Léo Matos 4'	Stadium: Arena do Grêmio; Attendance: 50,886; Referee: Raphael Claus

16 September 30	Novorizontino	2–0	Grêmio	Novo Horizonte
21:30 UTC−3	Douglas Baggio 24'; Gustavo Bochecha 32'	Report		Stadium: Estádio Doutor Jorge Ismael de Biasi; Attendance: 2,889; Referee: Ramon Abatti Abel

20 September 31	Grêmio	3–0	Sport	Porto Alegre
20:30 UTC−3	Gabriel Teixeira 51'; Lucas Leiva 59'; Bitello 73'	Report		Stadium: Arena do Grêmio; Attendance: 24,668; Referee: Luiz Flávio de Oliveira

30 September 32	Sampaio Corrêa	2–1	Grêmio	São Luís
19:00 UTC−3	Rafael Vila 15'; Gabriel Poveda 57'	Report	Elkeson 82'	Stadium: Castelão; Referee: Rafael Traci

4 October 33	Grêmio	2–0	CSA	Porto Alegre
19:00 UTC−3	Lucas Leiva 13'; Diego Souza 20'	Report		Stadium: Arena do Grêmio; Attendance: 13,999; Referee: Caio Max Augusto Vieira

8 October 34	Londrina	1–1	Grêmio	Londrina
16:30 UTC−3	João Paulo 86' (pen.)	Report	Diego Souza 43'	Stadium: Estádio do Café; Attendance: 6,205; Referee: Wilton Pereira Sampaio

16 October 35	Grêmio	1–1	Bahia	Porto Alegre
16:00 UTC−3	Thiago Santos 84'	Report	Lucas Mugni 45+4'	Stadium: Arena do Grêmio; Attendance: 44,648; Referee: Luiz Flávio de Oliveira

23 October 36	Náutico	0–3	Grêmio	Recife
16:00 UTC−3		Report	Bitello 26', 67'; Lucas Leiva 62'	Stadium: Estádio dos Aflitos; Attendance: 6,961; Referee: Jefferson Ferreira de Moraes

28 October 37	Tombense	2–2	Grêmio	Tombos
21:30 UTC−3	Jean Lucas 29'; Renatinho 77'	Report	Elkeson 7' (pen.); Gabriel Silva 17' (pen.)	Stadium: Almeidão; Referee: Paulo Roberto Alves Júnior

3 November 38	Grêmio	3–0	Brusque	Porto Alegre
20:00 UTC−3	Guilherme 19'; Gabriel Silva 45+3', 75'	Report		Stadium: Arena do Grêmio; Attendance: 16,688; Referee: Rodrigo José Pereira de Lima

=== Copa do Brasil ===
==== First round ====
The draw for the first round was held on 17 January 2022, 13:00 UTC−03:00, at the CBF headquarters in Rio de Janeiro.

1 March Single match	Mirassol	3–2	Grêmio	Mirassol
21:30 UTC−3	Camilo 5'; Fabrício Daniel 30'; Fabinho 53'	Report	Diego Souza 19'; Bruno Alves 22'	Stadium: Estádio José Maria de Campos Maia; Referee: Paulo Roberto Alves Júnior
