= 2025 Coritiba Foot Ball Club season =

Coritiba Foot Ball Club
2025 season
- Manager: Mozart
- Stadium: Estádio Couto Pereira
- Campeonato Brasileiro Série B: 1st (promoted)
- Campeonato Paranaense: Quarter-finals
- Copa do Brasil: First round
- Average home league attendance: 22,207
- Biggest win: Coritiba 3–0 São Joseense
- Biggest defeat: Coritiba 0–2 Londrina

The 2025 season was the 116th competitive campaign for Coritiba Foot Ball Club. The team took part in the Campeonato Brasileiro Série B for the second consecutive season, the Campeonato Paranaense, and the Copa do Brasil.

== Squad ==
=== First-team squad ===
As of 23 March 2025

Note: Flags indicate national team as defined under FIFA eligibility rules; some limited exceptions apply. Players may hold more than one non-FIFA nationality.

No.	Pos.	Nation	Player
1	GK	BRA	Pedro Morisco
2	DF	URU	Matías Fracchia
3	DF	BRA	Maicon (on loan from Vasco da Gama)
4	DF	BRA	Rodrigo Moledo
5	MF	BRA	Geovane
6	DF	BRA	Rodrigo Gelado
7	FW	BRA	Nicolas Careca
8	MF	BRA	Filipe Machado (on loan from Vitória)
9	FW	BRA	Júnior Brumado (on loan from Midtjylland)
10	MF	POR	Josué
11	FW	BRA	Lucas Ronier
12	GK	BRA	Pedro Rangel (on loan from Fluminense)
14	DF	BRA	Thalisson
16	DF	BRA	João Almeida
17	MF	BRA	Jean Gabriel
19	MF	COL	Sebastián Gómez

No.	Pos.	Nation	Player
22	DF	BRA	Felipe Guimarães
23	DF	BRA	Tiago Cóser
25	MF	BRA	Jorge Vinicius
26	DF	BRA	Bruno Melo
27	MF	URU	Carlos de Pena
33	FW	BRA	Caio Matheus
36	MF	BRA	Vini Paulista
37	FW	BRA	Everaldo (on loan from Vitória)
38	MF	BRA	Geovane Meurer
49	FW	BRA	Dellatorre
57	FW	BRA	Wesley Pomba
67	GK	BRA	Benassi
77	FW	BRA	Éberth
87	GK	BRA	Gabriel Leite
91	FW	BRA	Gustavo Coutinho (on loan from Sport Recife)
—	DF	BRA	Zeca
—	MF	BRA	Wallisson (on loan from Moreirense)

=== Transfers In ===
Pos.	Player	Transferred from	Fee	Date	Source
DF	(Brazil) Maicon	(Brazil) Vasco da Gama	Loan	9 January 2025	
MF	(Brazil) Everaldo	(Brazil) Vitória	Undisclosed	14 January 2025	

=== Transfers Out ===
Pos.	Player	Transferred to	Fee	Date	Source
DF	(Brazil) Diogo Batista	(Brazil) Água Santa	Loan	10 January 2025	
FW	(Brazil) David da Hora	(Brazil) CRB	Loan	10 January 2025	
GK	(Brazil) Gabriel Vasconcelos	(Brazil) Vitória	Undisclosed	13 January 2025	

== Exhibition matches ==
5 January 2025 Friendly	Figueirense	1–0	Coritiba

16 March 2025 Friendly	Coritiba	1–4	Santos

== Competitions ==
=== Overall record ===
Competition	First match	Last match	Starting round	Final position	Record							
Competition	First match	Last match	Starting round	Final position	Pld	W	D	L	GF	GA	GD	Win %
Campeonato Brasileiro Série B	5 April 2025	23 November 2025	Matchday 1	Winners	38	19	11	8	39	23	+16	50.00
Campeonato Paranaense	12 January 2025	9 March 2025	First stage	Quarter-finals	3	1	0	2	3	3	+0	33.33
Copa do Brasil	27 February 2025	27 February 2025	First round	First round	1	0	1	0	2	2	+0	0.00
Total					42	20	12	10	44	28	+16	47.62

Last updated: 23 November 2025
Source: Competitions

=== Série B ===
==== League table ====
Pos	Team	Pld	W	D	L	GF	GA	GD	Pts	Promotion or relegation
1	Coritiba (C, P)	38	19	11	8	39	23	+16	68	Promotion to 2026 Campeonato Brasileiro Série A
2	Athletico Paranaense (P)	38	19	8	11	53	43	+10	65	Promotion to 2026 Campeonato Brasileiro Série A
3	Chapecoense (P)	38	18	8	12	52	35	+17	62	Promotion to 2026 Campeonato Brasileiro Série A
4	Remo (P)	38	16	14	8	51	39	+12	62	Promotion to 2026 Campeonato Brasileiro Série A
5	Criciúma	38	17	10	11	47	33	+14	61	

Source: CBF
Rules for classification: 1) points; 2) wins; 3) goal difference; 4) goals scored; 5) head-to-head results (only between 2 teams); 6) fewest red cards; 7) fewest yellow cards; 8) drawing of lots.
(C) Champions; (P) Promoted

==== Matches ====
5 April 2025 1	Coritiba	1–0	Vila Nova	Curitiba
15:00	Josué 90+7' (pen.)			Stadium: Estádio Couto Pereira

12 April 2025 2	Chapecoense	1–2	Coritiba

16 April 2025 3	Coritiba	0–0	Novorizontino

21 April 2025 4	Remo	1–0	Coritiba

26 April 2025 5	Coritiba	2–0	Operário Ferroviário

2 May 2025 6	Ferroviária	2–1	Coritiba

10 May 2025 7	Goiás	1–0	Coritiba

19 May 2025 8	Coritiba	1–0	América Mineiro

26 May 2025 9	Criciúma	0–1	Coritiba

31 May 2025 10	Coritiba	2–1	Avaí

5 June 2025 11	Botafogo-SP	0–0	Coritiba

15 June 2025 12	Atlético Goianiense	0–0	Coritiba

22 June 2025 13	Coritiba	2–0	Cuiabá

28 June 2025 14	Athletico Paranaense	0–1	Coritiba

4 July 2025 15	Coritiba	2–0	Volta Redonda

10 July 2025 16	CRB	0–1	Coritiba

19 July 2025 17	Coritiba	2–5	Paysandu

22 July 2025 18	Athletic	1–1	Coritiba

27 July 2025 19	Coritiba	1–1	Amazonas

31 July 2025 20	Vila Nova	1–2	Coritiba

8 August 2025 21	Coritiba	0–0	Chapecoense

14 August 2025 22	Novorizontino	1–2	Coritiba

23 August 2025 23	Coritiba	0–0	Remo

29 August 2025 24	Operário Ferroviário	1–0	Coritiba

5 September 2025 25	Coritiba	4–0	Ferroviária

12 September 2025 26	Coritiba	0–0	Goiás

21 September 2025 27	América Mineiro	1–0	Coritiba

25 September 2025 28	Coritiba	0–2	Criciúma

29 September 2025 29	Avaí	0–2	Coritiba

3 October 2025 30	Coritiba	2–0	Botafogo-SP

9 October 2025 31	Coritiba	2–1	Atlético Goianiense

12 October 2025 32	Cuiabá	1–0	Coritiba

19 October 2025 33	Coritiba	0–0	Athletico Paranaense

25 October 2025 34	Volta Redonda	0–1	Coritiba

31 October 2025 35	Coritiba	0–0	CRB

9 November 2025 36	Paysandu	1–2	Coritiba

15 November 2025 37	Coritiba	0–0	Athletic

23 November 2025 38	Amazonas	1–2	Coritiba

=== Campeonato Paranaense ===
Pos	Team	Pld	W	D	L	GF	GA	GD	Pts	Qualification or relegation
1	Operário Ferroviário	11	6	4	1	18	7	+11	22	Advance to Final stage
2	Athletico Paranaense	11	6	4	1	19	9	+10	22	Advance to Final stage
3	Coritiba	11	6	2	3	19	8	+11	20	Advance to Final stage
4	Londrina	11	6	2	3	16	10	+6	20	Advance to Final stage
5	Cianorte	11	5	2	4	18	13	+5	17	Advance to Final stage

Source: FPF

==== Results by round ====
Round	1	2	3	4
Ground	H	H	A	A
Result	L	W	L	
Position				

Updated to match(es) played on 19 January 2025. Source:
A = Away; H = Home; W = Win; D = Draw; L = Loss

12 January 2025 1	Coritiba	0–2	Londrina	Curitiba
16:00 UTC−3			Iago Teles 3' (pen.), 16'	Stadium: Estádio Couto Pereira

15 January 2025 2	Coritiba	3–0	São Joseense	Curitiba
20:00 UTC−3	Júnior Brumado 40'; Jamerson Bahia 62'; Matheus Bianqui 73'			Stadium: Estádio Couto Pereira

19 January 2025 3	Cascavel	1–0	Coritiba
16:00 UTC−3	Josiel 53'

22 January 2025 4	Maringá	v	Coritiba
20:00 UTC−3

=== Copa do Brasil ===
27 February 2025 First round	Ceilândia	2–2 (4–2 p)	Coritiba	Ceilândia
19:00	Clemente 51', 69'	Report	Lucas Ronier 55'; Bianqui 90+2'	Stadium: Abadião; Attendance: 2,669; Referee: Alex Gomes Stefano (Rio de Janeiro)
