= Gabriel Silva =

Gabriel Silva may refer to:

- Gabriel Silva Luján, (born 1957) Colombian diplomat and political scientist.
- Gabriel Silva (footballer, born 1989) (born 1989), Brazilian football leftback and manager
- Gabriel Silva (footballer, born 1991), Brazilian football leftback for Ponte Preta
- Gabriel Silva (footballer, born 1997), Brazilian football forward for Svay Rieng
- Gabriel Silva (footballer, born March 2002), Brazilian football forward for Santa Clara
- Gabriel Silva (footballer, born July 2002), Brazilian football attacking midfielder or forward for Cianorte
- Gabriel Silva (footballer, born 2007), Portuguese football forward for Sporting U17
- Gabriel A. Silva, neuroscientist
- Gabriel Silva (Panamanian congressman)
