= Gabriel Leite =

Gabriel Leite may refer to:

- Gabriel Leite (footballer, born 1987), Brazilian football goalkeeper
- Gabriel Leite (footballer, born 1995), Brazilian football midfielder
