= Pedro Morisco =

Brazilian footballer (born 2004)

Personal information
- Full name: Pedro Luccas Morisco da Silva
- Date of birth: 10 January 2004 (age 22)
- Place of birth: Curitiba, Brazil
- Height: 1.91 m (6 ft 3 in)
- Position: Goalkeeper

Team information
- Current team: Coritiba
- Number: 1

Youth career
- 2013–2023: Coritiba

Senior career*
Years	Team	Apps	(Gls)
2023–	Coritiba	111	(0)

International career^{‡}
2026–	Brazil	2	(0)
- * Club domestic league appearances and goals as of 14 November 2026 ‡ National team caps and goals as of 12 November 2026

Pedro Luccas Morisco da Silva (born 10 January 2004) is a Brazilian footballer who plays as a goalkeeper for Coritiba and the Brazil national team.

== Club career ==
Born in Curitiba, Paraná, Morisco joined Coritiba's youth setup in 2013, aged nine. He was promoted to the first team in July 2023, after impressing with the under-20s.

Morisco made his first team – and Série A – debut on 29 November 2023, starting in a 1–1 home draw against Botafogo, as his side were already relegated. In the following year, he established himself as a first-choice, and renewed his contract until 2027 on 20 June 2024.

In 2025, after spending three months recovering from a hand injury, Morisco returned to the field on 19 May, and kept eight clean sheets in his first nine matches after returning, earning the highest average rating on Sofascore for the season among goalkeepers in the world's top 20 leagues. Regularly used, he spent another four months sidelined due to a shoulder injury from February to July 2026.

== International career ==
On 18 November 2020, Morisco was called up to the Brazil national under-17 team for a period of trainings.

On 9 September 2026, he was called up to the full side by Carlo Ancelotti for two friendlies against Australia and India. He make his debut against India on 3 October.

== Career statistics ==
As of match played 4 November 2026

Club	Season	League			State League		Cup		Continental		Other		Total	
Club	Season	Division	Apps	Goals	Apps	Goals	Apps	Goals	Apps	Goals	Apps	Goals	Apps	Goals
Coritiba	2023	Série A	3	0	0	0	0	0	—		—		3	0
Coritiba	2024	Série B	36	0	10	0	1	0	—		—		47	0
Coritiba	2025	Série B	30	0	10	0	1	0	—		—		41	0
Coritiba	2026	Série A	17	0	5	0	0	0	—		—		22	0
Career total			86	0	25	0	2	0	0	0	0	0	113	0
