= Jacy (footballer) =

Brazilian footballer (born 1997)

Personal information
- Full name: Jacy Maranhão Oliveira
- Date of birth: 11 July 1997 (age 29)
- Place of birth: Santa Inês, Brazil
- Height: 1.92 m (6 ft 4 in)
- Positions: Centre-back; defensive midfielder

Team information
- Current team: Coritiba
- Number: 55

Youth career
- 2012: Aparecidense
- 2013–2017: Atlético Paranaense

Senior career*
Years	Team	Apps	(Gls)
2017	Atlético Paranaense	4	(0)
2018–2019	Criciúma	3	(0)
2019–2021	Capivariano	0	(0)
2019	→ ViOn Zlaté Moravce (loan)	6	(0)
2020	→ Pohronie (loan)	0	(0)
2020	→ Pouso Alegre (loan)	1	(0)
2021	Rio Branco-PR	18	(0)
2021	São-Joseense	7	(0)
2022	Desportivo Brasil	8	(1)
2022	→ FC Cascavel (loan)	7	(1)
2023	FC Cascavel	14	(0)
2023	→ Paysandu (loan)	17	(1)
2024–2025	Operário Ferroviário	64	(3)
2025–	Coritiba	42	(3)
- * Club domestic league appearances and goals as of 7 April 2026

Jacy Maranhão Oliveira (born 11 July 1997), simply known as Jacy, is a Brazilian professional footballer who plays as either a centre-back or a defensive midfielder for Coritiba.

== Early life ==
Born in Santa Inês, Maranhão, Jacy moved to Goiânia at early age, as his mother was working in a cookie factory. He began his career with Aparecidense, but joined Atlético Paranaense's youth sides in 2013, aged 16.

== Club career ==
=== Atlético Paranaense ===
In January 2017, Jacy was promoted to the first team along with three other teammates from the under-20 team. He made his senior debut on 12 February of that year, starting in a 2–1 Campeonato Paranaense away loss to Prudentópolis, and played in a further three matches in the state league before being assigned to the under-23 squad for the remainder of the year.

=== Criciúma ===
On 22 January 2018, Jacy signed for Criciúma, with Atlético retaining 50% of his economic rights. He was rarely used during his spell at the club, featuring in just three matches.

=== ViOn Zlaté Moravce ===
Jacy joined ViOn Zlaté Moravce on a one-year loan from Capivariano, in late August 2019. He made his professional Fortuna Liga debut for ViOn Zlaté Moravce against Nitra on 26 October, coming on as a second-half substitute for Martin Kovaľ, who scored the only goal of the match, securing a narrow 1–0 win for the home side.

For the upcoming five games, Jacy became a regular in ViOn's kit, and made a starting-XI debut against Pohronie, on 23 November 2019, during a 1–1 tie. He played the entire game and was booked with a yellow card, for a scuffle with Patrik Jacko. He repeated the starting line-up achievement against Ružomberok, in his final game for ViOn.

Jacy also made two Slovnaft Cup appearances against Slavoj Trebišov and Pohronie. Overall, he recorded eight competitive starts for ViOn.

=== Pohronie ===
On 24 January 2020, ViOn had announced, prior to a friendly against Tatran Liptovský Mikuláš, that Jacy and Sílvio were free to take part in winter-break preparation with rivalling Pohronie. While Sílvio was unsuccessful with the club and ended up returning to his previous club Vllaznia Shkodër, Jacy's signing was announced on 30 January 2020.

Jacy was first nominated for a Fortuna Liga fixture in a goal-less tie against Nitra at pod Zoborom on 15 February 2020. He did not appear in the match though. Neither did he appear in any fixtures for Pohronie and departed from the club at the end of his contract as an unnecessary player, on 30 June 2020, despite the fact that the season was not yet concluded, after the delay caused by the COVID-19 pandemic.

=== Back to Brazil ===
Back to Brazil in September 2020, Jacy played for Pouso Alegre in the remainder of the year, still owned by Capivariano. In the 2021 season, he represented Rio Branco-PR and São-Joseense, moving to a defensive midfield role.

In November 2021, Jacy agreed to return to Rio Branco, but was announced at Desportivo Brasil on 16 December. In April 2022, he was loaned to FC Cascavel, and signed a permanent deal with the club on 26 October.

On 2 May 2023, Jacy was loaned to Série C side Paysandu until the end of the year.

=== Operário Ferroviário ===
On 1 December 2023, Jacy signed a one-year deal with Operário Ferroviário. Regularly used, he renewed his contract until the end of 2025 on 5 March 2024.

=== Coritiba ===
On 20 May 2025, Coritiba purchased Jacy from Operário for a rumoured fee of R$ 1.25 million; the player signed a three-year contract with his new club. Back to the centre-back position, he established himself as a first-choice and helped the club to achieve promotion to the Série A as champions.

Jacy made his top tier debut at the age of 28 on 28 January 2026, coming on as a second-half substitute for Joaquín Lavega in a 1–0 home loss to Red Bull Bragantino. He scored his first goal in the category on 12 March, netting the winner in a 1–0 away success over Corinthians; in the celebration, he honored his mother who died in October of the previous year.

== Career statistics ==
As of 4 May 2026.

Club	Season	League			State League		Cup		Continental		Other		Total	
Club	Season	Division	Apps	Goals	Apps	Goals	Apps	Goals	Apps	Goals	Apps	Goals	Apps	Goals
Atlético Paranaense	2017	Série A	0	0	4	0	0	0	—		—		4	0
Criciúma	2018	Série B	2	0	0	0	0	0	—		—		2	0
Criciúma	2019	Série B	0	0	1	0	0	0	—		—		1	0
Criciúma	Total		2	0	1	0	0	0	—		—		3	0
Capivariano	2019	Paulista A3	—		—		—		—		0	0	0	0
Capivariano	2020	Paulista A3	—		0	0	—		—		—		0	0
Capivariano	Total		—		0	0	—		—		0	0	0	0
ViOn Zlaté Moravce (loan)	2019–20	Fortuna liga	6	0	—		2	0	—		—		8	0
Pohronie (loan)	2019–20	Fortuna liga	0	0	—		0	0	—		—		0	0
Pouso Alegre	2020	Mineiro Módulo II	—		1	0	—		—		—		1	0
Rio Branco-PR	2021	Série D	10	0	8	0	—		—		—		18	0
São Joseense	2021	Paranaense Série Prata	—		7	0	—		—		—		7	0
Desportivo Brasil	2022	Paulista A3	—		8	1	—		—		—		8	1
FC Cascavel	2022	Série D	7	1	—		—		—		—		7	1
FC Cascavel	2023	Série D	—		14	0	—		—		—		14	0
FC Cascavel	Total		7	1	14	0	—		—		—		21	1
Paysandu (loan)	2023	Série C	17	1	—		—		—		—		17	1
Operário Ferroviário	2024	Série B	29	0	11	0	3	0	—		—		43	0
Operário Ferroviário	2025	Série B	5	0	13	3	3	0	—		—		21	3
Operário Ferroviário	Total		34	0	24	3	6	0	—		—		64	3
Coritiba	2025	Série B	27	1	—		—		—		—		27	1
Coritiba	2026	Série A	12	1	6	1	1	0	—		—		19	2
Coritiba	Total		39	2	6	1	1	0	—		—		46	3
Career total			115	4	73	5	9	0	0	0	0	0	197	9
