= 2024 Grêmio Novorizontino season =

Grêmio Novorizontino
2024 season
- Manager: Eduardo Baptista
- Stadium: Estádio Doutor Jorge Ismael de Biasi
- Campeonato Brasileiro Série B: 6th
- Campeonato Paulista: Semi-finals
- Top goalscorer: League: Fabrício Daniel; Lucca (3 each); All: Fabrício Daniel (5)
- Biggest defeat: Novorizontino 0–3 Ceará
Home colours	Away colours	Third colours

The 2024 season is the 15th season in existence of Grêmio Novorizontino and the club's second consecutive season in the second division of Brazilian football.

== First-team squad ==
As of 14 June 2024

Note: Flags indicate national team as defined under FIFA eligibility rules; some limited exceptions apply. Players may hold more than one non-FIFA nationality.

No.	Pos.	Nation	Player
1	GK	BRA	Airton
2	DF	BRA	Rodrigo Soares
3	DF	BRA	Rafael Donato
4	DF	BRA	Patrick (on loan from Portuguesa)
5	MF	BRA	Geovane
7	FW	BRA	Rodolfo
8	MF	BRA	Willian Farias
9	FW	BRA	Neto Pessoa
11	FW	BRA	Lucca
12	GK	BRA	Lucas Pereira
14	DF	BRA	Danilo Barcelos
16	DF	BRA	Reverson
19	FW	BRA	Léo Tocantins
21	MF	BRA	Eduardo

No.	Pos.	Nation	Player
22	DF	BRA	Raul Prata
23	GK	BRA	Marcelo
25	DF	BRA	Luisão
26	MF	BRA	Dantas
28	MF	BRA	Marlon
29	FW	BRA	Isack Pelé
30	FW	BRA	Waguininho
33	DF	BRA	Renato Palm
37	DF	BRA	César Martins
39	FW	BRA	Vitinho (on loan from Palmeiras)
75	FW	BRA	Paulo Vitor (on loan from Cruzeiro)
77	FW	BRA	Fabrício Daniel (on loan from Coritiba)
93	GK	BRA	Jordi

=== Youth team ===
Note: Flags indicate national team as defined under FIFA eligibility rules; some limited exceptions apply. Players may hold more than one non-FIFA nationality.

No.	Pos.	Nation	Player
56	DF	BRA	Enzo Rocha
85	DF	BRA	Gabriel Correia

=== Out on loan ===
Note: Flags indicate national team as defined under FIFA eligibility rules; some limited exceptions apply. Players may hold more than one non-FIFA nationality.

No.	Pos.	Nation	Player
—	MF	BRA	Diego Galo (on loan to Atlético Mineiro until 31 January 2025)
—	MF	BRA	Lucas Café (on loan to Inter de Limeira until 30 September 2024)

No.	Pos.	Nation	Player
—	MF	BRA	Tavinho (on loan to Fortaleza until 31 January 2025)
—	FW	BRA	Kauê Canela (on loan to Fortaleza until 31 January 2025)

== Competitions ==
=== Overall record ===
Competition	First match	Last match	Starting round	Final position	Record							
Competition	First match	Last match	Starting round	Final position	Pld	W	D	L	GF	GA	GD	Win %
Campeonato Brasileiro Série B	19 April 2024	26 November 2024	Matchday 1		37	18	10	9	43	40	+3	48.65
Campeonato Paulista	21 January 2024	28 March 2024	First stage	Semi-finals	14	6	5	3	17	12	+5	42.86
Total					51	24	15	12	60	52	+8	47.06

Last updated: 8 July 2024
Source: Soccerway

=== Série B ===
==== League table ====
Pos	Team	Pld	W	D	L	GF	GA	GD	Pts	Promotion or relegation
3	Sport (P)	38	19	9	10	57	37	+20	66	Promotion to 2025 Campeonato Brasileiro Série A
4	Ceará (P)	38	19	7	12	59	41	+18	64	Promotion to 2025 Campeonato Brasileiro Série A
5	Novorizontino	38	18	10	10	43	31	+12	64	
6	Goiás	38	18	9	11	56	32	+24	63	
7	Operário Ferroviário	38	16	10	12	34	32	+2	58	

Source: CBF
Rules for classification: 1) points; 2) wins; 3) goal difference; 4) goals scored; 5) head-to-head results (only between 2 teams); 6) fewest red cards; 7) fewest yellow cards; 8) drawing of lots.
(P) Promoted

==== Results summary ====
Overall								Home						Away					
Pld	W	D	L	GF	GA	GD	Pts	W	D	L	GF	GA	GD	W	D	L	GF	GA	GD
14	6	4	4	14	14	0	22	2	3	1	7	7	0	4	1	3	7	7	0

Last updated: 8 July 2024.

==== Results by round ====
Round	1	2	3	4	5	6	7	8	9	10	11	12	13	14	15
Ground	H	A	A	H	A	H	A	A	H	A	H	A	H	A	H
Result	W	L	W	L	L	D	W	D	W	L	D	W	D	W	
Position															

Updated to match(es) played on 8 July 2024. Source:
A = Away; H = Home; W = Win; D = Draw; L = Loss

==== Matches ====
19 April 2024 1	Novorizontino	2–1	CRB

27 April 2024 2	América Mineiro	2–0	Novorizontino	Belo Horizonte
18:00 UTC−3				Stadium: Arena Independência

4 May 2024 3	Ituano	1–3	Novorizontino	Itu
21:00 UTC−3				Stadium: Estádio Novelli Júnior

10 May 2024 4	Novorizontino	0–3	Ceará

15 May 2024 5	Vila Nova	2–1	Novorizontino	Goiânia
19:00 UTC−3

17 May 2024 6	Novorizontino	0–0	Coritiba

27 May 2024 7	Botafogo-SP	0–1	Novorizontino

1 June 2024 8	Brusque	0–0	Novorizontino

7 June 2024 9	Novorizontino	3–1	Santos	Novo Horizonte
21:00 UTC−3				Stadium: Estádio Doutor Jorge Ismael de Biasi

15 June 2024 10	Ponte Preta	1–0	Novorizontino

18 June 2024 11	Novorizontino	1–1	Amazonas	Novo Horizonte
21:00 UTC−3				Stadium: Estádio Doutor Jorge Ismael de Biasi

24 June 2024 12	Sport	1–2	Novorizontino

2 July 2024 13	Novorizontino	1–1	Mirassol	Novo Horizonte
20:00 UTC−3	Fabrício Daniel 9'; Paulo Vitor (yellow card) 37' (yellow-red card) 90+2'		Dellatorre 45+3'	Stadium: Estádio Doutor Jorge Ismael de Biasi; Referee: Lucas Paulo Torezin

8 July 2024 14	Avaí	0–1	Novorizontino	Florianópolis
20:00 UTC−3			Rodolfo 43'	Stadium: Estádio da Ressacada; Referee: André Luiz Skettino

13 July 2024 15	Novorizontino	v	Guarani	Novo Horizonte
15:30 UTC−3				Stadium: Estádio Doutor Jorge Ismael de Biasi

=== Campeonato Paulista ===
Pos	Team	Pld	W	D	L	GF	GA	GD	Pts	Qualification
1	São Paulo	12	6	4	2	20	12	+8	22	Knockout stage
2	Novorizontino	12	6	4	2	16	10	+6	22	Knockout stage
3	São Bernardo	12	6	3	3	14	9	+5	21	
4	Botafogo-SP	12	3	3	6	8	16	−8	12	

Source: Soccerway
