= João Almeida (footballer, born 2006) =

Brazilian footballer (born 2006)

Personal information
- Full name: João Vitor da Silva Almeida
- Date of birth: 16 January 2006 (age 20)
- Place of birth: Colombo, Brazil
- Height: 1.77 m (5 ft 10 in)
- Position: Left-back

Team information
- Current team: Le Mans (on loan from Coritiba)
- Number: 16

Youth career
- 2019–2025: Coritiba

Senior career*
| Years | Team | Apps | (Gls) |
| 2025– | Coritiba | 28 | (0) |
| 2026– | → Le Mans (loan) | 0 | (0) |
- * Club domestic league appearances and goals as of 6 September 2026

João Vitor da Silva Almeida (born 16 January 2006), known as João Almeida, is a Brazilian footballer who plays as a left-back for Ligue 1 club Le Mans on loan from Campeonato Brasileiro Série A club Coritiba.

== Career ==
Born in Colombo, Paraná, João Almeida joined Coritiba's youth setup in 2019, aged 13. Promoted to the first team for the 2025 season, he was initially a third-choice behind Jamerson and Rodrigo Gelado, but made his first team debut on 12 January of that year by starting in a 2–0 home loss to Londrina.

João Almeida subsequently established himself as a starter during the 2025 Campeonato Paranaense, but suffered an injury and went back to a third-choice option after the arrival of Zeca. On 19 February 2026, he renewed his contract until December 2029.

On 8 September 2026, Almeida was loaned by Le Mans in France.

== Career statistics ==
As of 4 May 2026

| Club | Season | League | | | State League | | Cup | | Continental | | Other | | Total | |
| Club | Season | Division | Apps | Goals | Apps | Goals | Apps | Goals | Apps | Goals | Apps | Goals | Apps | Goals |
|---|---|---|---|---|---|---|---|---|---|---|---|---|---|---|
| Coritiba | 2025 | Série B | 13 | 0 | 9 | 0 | 1 | 0 | — | | 2 (Note: Appearance(s) in Taça FPF) | 0 | 25 | 0 |
| Coritiba | 2026 | Série A | 1 | 0 | 6 | 0 | 0 | 0 | — | | — | | 7 | 0 |
| Career total | | | 14 | 0 | 15 | 0 | 1 | 0 | 0 | 0 | 2 | 0 | 32 | 0 |

== Honours ==
Coritiba

- Campeonato Brasileiro Série B: 2025
