= Lucas Taverna =

Brazilian footballer (born 2006)

Personal information
- Full name: Lucas Taverna
- Date of birth: 8 May 2007 (age 19)
- Place of birth: Curitiba, Brazil
- Height: 1.75 m (5 ft 9 in)
- Position: Right-back

Team information
- Current team: Coritiba
- Number: 86

Youth career
- 2016–: Coritiba

Senior career*
Years	Team	Apps	(Gls)
2026–	Coritiba	6	(0)
- * Club domestic league appearances and goals as of 22:44, 17 May 2026 (UTC)

Lucas Taverna (born 8 May 2007) is a Brazilian footballer who plays as a right-back for Coritiba.

== Career ==
Born in Curitiba, Paraná, Taverna joined Coritiba's youth setup in 2016, aged nine. On 26 February 2024, he signed his first professional contract with the club.

Taverna made his first team debut with Coxa on 12 January 2025, starting in a 2–0 Campeonato Paranaense home loss to Londrina, as the squad was mainly composed by under-20 players. Mainly used in the under-20 team during the season, he only returned to feature in May 2026, after Tinga was injured and JP Chermont was unavailable.

== Career statistics ==
As of match played 17 May 2026

Club	Season	League			State League		Cup		Continental		Other		Total	
Club	Season	Division	Apps	Goals	Apps	Goals	Apps	Goals	Apps	Goals	Apps	Goals	Apps	Goals
Coritiba	2025	Série B	0	0	3	0	0	0	—		6 (Note: Appearance(s) in Taça FPF)	0	9	0
Coritiba	2026	Série A	1	0	2	0	1	0	—		—		4	0
Career total			1	0	5	0	1	0	0	0	6	0	13	0

== Honours ==
Coritiba

- Campeonato Brasileiro Série B: 2025
