= Rubens Ricoldi =

Brazilian footballer

Rubens
Personal information
- Full name: Rubens Tadeu Hartmann Ricoldi
- Date of birth: 28 March 2003 (age 23)
- Place of birth: Porto Alegre, Brazil
- Height: 1.73 m (5 ft 8 in)
- Position: Forward

Team information
- Current team: Chapecoense
- Number: 70

Youth career
- 2011–2023: Grêmio

Senior career*
Years	Team	Apps	(Gls)
2023–2024	Grêmio	5	(0)
2024	→ Chapecoense (loan)	7	(0)
2025–	Chapecoense	20	(2)
- * Club domestic league appearances and goals as of 9 April 2026

Rubens Tadeu Hartmann Ricoldi (born 28 March 2003), known as Rubens Ricoldi or just Rubens, is a Brazilian footballer who plays as a forward for Chapecoense.

== Career ==
Born in Porto Alegre, Rio Grande do Sul, Rubens joined Grêmio's youth sides in 2011, aged eight. After making his senior debut with an under-23 side in the Copa FGF, he made his first appearance with the main squad on 18 February 2023, coming on as a second-half substitute for Gabriel Silva in a 0–0 Campeonato Gaúcho away draw against São Luiz.

On 5 April 2024, after being rarely used, Rubens was loaned to Chapecoense until the end of the year. On 3 December, he signed a permanent two-year deal with the club.

Rubens scored his first professional goal on 21 January 2026, netting the equalizer in a 1–1 Campeonato Catarinense away draw against Avaí.

== Career statistics ==
As of 9 February 2026

Club	Season	League			State League		Cup		Continental		Other		Total	
Club	Season	Division	Apps	Goals	Apps	Goals	Apps	Goals	Apps	Goals	Apps	Goals	Apps	Goals
Grêmio	2021	Série A	0	0	—		—		—		1 (Note: Appearance(s) in Copa FGF)	1	1	1
Grêmio	2022	Série A	0	0	—		—		—		3	0	3	0
Grêmio	2023	Série A	0	0	2	0	—		—		3	0	5	0
Grêmio	2024	Série A	—		3	0	—		—		1 (Note: Appearance(s) in Recopa Gaúcha)	0	4	0
Grêmio	Total		0	0	5	0	—		—		8	1	13	1
Chapecoense	2024	Série B	7	0	—		—		—		9 (Note: Appearance(s) in Copa Santa Catarina)	2	16	2
Chapecoense	2025	Série B	5	0	3	0	—		—		4	2	12	2
Chapecoense	2026	Série A	1	0	3	1	0	0	—		0	0	4	1
Chapecoense	Total		13	0	6	1	0	0	—		13	4	32	5
Career total			13	0	11	1	0	0	0	0	21	5	45	6

== Honours ==
Grêmio

- Campeonato Gaúcho: 2023, 2024
