= Alex Silva (footballer, born 1994) =

Brazilian footballer

Personal information
- Full name: Alex da Silva
- Date of birth: 15 May 1994 (age 32)
- Place of birth: Nanuque, Brazil
- Height: 1.84 m (6 ft 1/2 in)
- Position: Right-back

Team information
- Current team: América Mineiro
- Number: 15

Youth career
- 2013–2014: Atlético Mineiro

Senior career*
| Years | Team | Apps | (Gls) |
| 2013–2020 | Atlético Mineiro | 47 | (0) |
| 2015 | → Sport Recife (loan) | 2 | (0) |
| 2016 | → Ferroviária (loan) | 4 | (0) |
| 2017 | → América Mineiro (loan) | 1 | (0) |
| 2018 | → Goiás (loan) | 46 | (5) |
| 2019 | → Avaí (loan) | 12 | (2) |
| 2020 | → Coimbra (loan) | 6 | (0) |
| 2020–2021 | Operário Ferroviário | 48 | (2) |
| 2022 | Água Santa | 7 | (1) |
| 2022–2023 | Vila Nova | 30 | (0) |
| 2023 | Al-Merrikh | | |
| 2023 | ABC | 10 | (0) |
| 2024 | Água Santa | 9 | (0) |
| 2024 | → Mirassol (loan) | 26 | (1) |
| 2025 | Portuguesa | 7 | (0) |
| 2025 | Coritiba | 25 | (2) |
| 2026 | Ceará | 14 | (0) |
| 2026– | América Mineiro | 8 | (0) |
- * Club domestic league appearances and goals as of 18 November 2026

Alex da Silva (born 15 May 1994), known as Alex Silva, is a Brazilian professional footballer who plays as a right-back for América Mineiro.

== Club career ==
Born in Nanuque, Minas Gerais, Alex Silva joined Atlético Mineiro's youth setup in January 2013. On 20 October he made his first team – and Série A – debut, playing the last 12 minutes in a 1–0 home win against Flamengo.

On 22 January 2014 Alex Silva was definitely promoted to the main squad by manager Paulo Autuori. He renewed his link with Galo on 10 March, running until 2017, and appeared in 40 matches during the campaign (22 in the league).

Alex Silva subsequently had unassuming loan spells at Sport Recife, Ferroviária and América Mineiro before returning to Galo in May 2017, acting as a backup to Marcos Rocha. On 19 January 2018, he joined Goiás also in a temporary deal, and helped the club achieve promotion to the top tier.

On 10 January 2019, Alex Silva was presented at Avaí, after agreeing to a season-long loan deal. After just one league match, he played the 2020 Campeonato Mineiro at Coimbra, before rescinding his link with Atlético on 19 May of that year.

On 19 June 2020, Alex Silva was announced at Operário Ferroviário. He subsequently signed for Água Santa, where he was a starter during the 2022 Campeonato Paulista; in February, during a match against Novorizontino he fainted on the field unconscious, being led to a hospital by ambulance.

On 4 March 2022, Alex Silva joined Vila Nova. In January 2023, he moved abroad for the first time in his career after signing for Sudan Premier League side Al-Merrikh, but returned to Brazil in April, after the start of the Sudanese civil war.

On 28 July 2023, Alex Silva agreed to a deal with ABC, before returning to Água Santa in November. On 1 April 2024, he moved to Mirassol on loan, and was a backup to Lucas Ramon in the club's first-ever promotion to the top tier.

On 3 January 2025, Alex Silva was announced at Portuguesa. On 24 March, he rescinded his contract with the club to join Coritiba.

== Career statistics ==
As of 24 February 2025

Appearances and goals by club, season and competition
| Club | Season | League | | | State league (Note: Includes in Campeonato Mineiro, Campeonato Pernambucano, Campeonato Paulista, Campeonato Goiano, Campeonato Catarinense, Campeonato Paranaense) | | National cup | | Continental | | Other | | Total | |
| Club | Season | Division | Apps | Goals | Apps | Goals | Apps | Goals | Apps | Goals | Apps | Goals | Apps | Goals |
|---|---|---|---|---|---|---|---|---|---|---|---|---|---|---|
| Atlético Mineiro | 2013 | Série A | 1 | 0 | — | | — | | — | | — | | 1 | 0 |
| Atlético Mineiro | 2014 | Série A | 22 | 0 | 11 | 0 | 3 | 0 | 4 (Note: Appearance(s) in Copa Libertadores) | 0 | 0 | 0 | 40 | 0 |
| Atlético Mineiro | 2016 | Série A | 1 | 0 | — | | — | | — | | — | | 1 | 0 |
| Atlético Mineiro | 2017 | Série A | 12 | 0 | — | | — | | 1 | 0 | 1 (Note: Appearance(s) in Primeira Liga) | 0 | 14 | 0 |
| Atlético Mineiro | Total | | 36 | 0 | 11 | 0 | 3 | 0 | 5 | 0 | 1 | 0 | 56 | 0 |
| Sport Recife (loan) | 2015 | Série A | 0 | 0 | 2 | 0 | — | | — | | 2 (Note: Appearance(s) in Copa do Nordeste) | 0 | 4 | 0 |
| Ferroviária (loan) | 2016 | Paulista | — | | 4 | 0 | 1 | 0 | — | | — | | 5 | 0 |
| América Mineiro (loan) | 2017 | Série B | 1 | 0 | 7 | 0 | 1 | 0 | — | | 2 | 0 | 11 | 0 |
| Goiás (loan) | 2018 | Série B | 34 | 4 | 12 | 1 | 3 | 1 | — | | — | | 49 | 6 |
| Avaí (loan) | 2019 | Série A | 1 | 0 | 11 | 2 | 2 | 0 | — | | — | | 14 | 2 |
| Coimbra (loan) | 2020 | Mineiro | — | | 6 | 0 | — | | — | | — | | 6 | 0 |
| Operário Ferroviário | 2020 | Série B | 12 | 1 | — | | — | | — | | — | | 12 | 1 |
| Operário Ferroviário | 2021 | Série B | 26 | 0 | 10 | 1 | 1 | 0 | — | | — | | 37 | 1 |
| Operário Ferroviário | Total | | 38 | 1 | 10 | 1 | 1 | 0 | — | | — | | 49 | 2 |
| Água Santa | 2022 | Paulista | — | | 7 | 1 | — | | — | | — | | 7 | 1 |
| Villa Nova | 2022 | Série B | 29 | 0 | — | | 2 | 0 | — | | 6 (Note: Appearance(s) in Copa Verde) | 0 | 37 | 0 |
| Villa Nova | 2023 | Série B | — | | 1 | 0 | — | | — | | — | | 1 | 0 |
| Villa Nova | Total | | 29 | 0 | 1 | 0 | 2 | 0 | — | | 6 | 0 | 38 | 0 |
| Al-Merrikh | 2022–23 | Sudan Premier League | — | | — | | — | | 6 (Note: Appearance(s) in CAF Champions League) | 0 | — | | 6 | 0 |
| ABC | 2023 | Série B | 10 | 0 | — | | — | | — | | — | | 10 | 0 |
| Água Santa | 2024 | Série D | — | | 9 | 0 | 1 | 0 | — | | — | | 10 | 0 |
| Mirassol (loan) | 2024 | Série B | 26 | 1 | — | | — | | — | | 3 (Note: Appearance(s) in Copa Paulista) | 1 | 29 | 2 |
| Portuguesa | 2025 | Série D | 0 | 0 | 7 | 0 | 0 | 0 | — | | — | | 7 | 0 |
| Coritiba | 2025 | Série B | 0 | 0 | — | | — | | — | | — | | 0 | 0 |
| Career Total | | | 175 | 6 | 87 | 5 | 14 | 1 | 11 | 0 | 14 | 1 | 301 | 13 |

== Honours ==
Atlético Mineiro

- Recopa Sudamericana: 2014
- Copa do Brasil: 2014

Goiás

- Campeonato Goiano: 2018

Avaí

- Campeonato Catarinense: 2019
