= Fabrício Daniel =

Brazilian footballer (born 1997)

Personal information
- Full name: Fabrício Daniel de Souza
- Date of birth: 23 July 1997 (age 29)
- Place of birth: Araraquara, Brazil
- Height: 1.82 m (6 ft 0 in)
- Positions: Right winger; forward

Team information
- Current team: São Bernardo
- Number: 10

Youth career
- 2011: Ferroviária
- 2012: Palmeirinha
- 2013: Paulistinha
- 2014–2016: Ferroviária
- 2017–2018: Santos

Senior career*
Years	Team	Apps	(Gls)
2015–2016	Ferroviária	4	(1)
2015	→ Noroeste (loan)	6	(0)
2017–2019	Santos	0	(0)
2019	→ Cianorte (loan)	4	(1)
2020	Noroeste	11	(6)
2020	Cuiabá	8	(0)
2020–2022	Mirassol	49	(20)
2021	→ América Mineiro (loan)	22	(3)
2022–2024	Coritiba	40	(3)
2023	→ Sport Recife (loan)	23	(4)
2024	→ Novorizontino (loan)	28	(5)
2025	São Bernardo	13	(5)
2025–2026	Mirassol	8	(0)
2025	→ Ferroviária (loan)	17	(3)
2026–	São Bernardo	26	(4)
- * Club domestic league appearances and goals as of 18 November 2026

Fabrício Daniel de Souza (born 23 July 1997), known as Fabrício Daniel or simply Fabrício, is a Brazilian footballer who plays as a right winger or forward for São Bernardo.

== Career ==
Born in Araraquara, São Paulo, Fabrício finished his formation with Ferroviária, and made his senior debut while on loan at Noroeste in 2015. He made his first team debut for AFE on 2 September 2016, starting and scoring the third in a 3–0 Copa Paulista away win against Matonense.

On 4 January 2017, Fabrício signed a three-year contract with Santos, being initially assigned to the B-team. On 1 March 2019, he was loaned to Cianorte until the end of the season.

Fabrício made his professional debut on 22 March 2019, coming on as a second-half substitute for Fernandinho and scoring the winner in a 2–1 away defeat of Paraná for the Campeonato Paranaense championship. On 2 December, he returned to Noroeste after his contract with Santos expired.

On 19 June 2020, Fabrício joined Série B side Cuiabá on a three-month deal. On 23 September, after his deal expired, he moved to Mirassol in the Série D, and helped the club win their first national trophy in their history by netting 11 goals.

== Career statistics ==
As of 24 February 2025

Club	Season	League			State League		Cup		Continental		Other		Total	
Club	Season	Division	Apps	Goals	Apps	Goals	Apps	Goals	Apps	Goals	Apps	Goals	Apps	Goals
Noroeste (loan)	2015	Paulista 2ª Divisão	—		6	0	—		—		—		6	0
Ferroviária	2016	Paulista	—		0	0	—		—		7 (Note: Appearance(s) in Copa Paulista)	2	7	2
Santos	2017	Série A	0	0	—		0	0	—		9	0	9	0
Santos	2018	Série A	0	0	—		0	0	—		8	1	8	1
Santos	Total		0	0	—		0	0	—		17	1	17	1
Cianorte (loan)	2019	Série D	1	0	3	1	—		—		—		4	1
Noroeste	2020	Paulista A3	—		11	6	—		—		—		11	6
Cuiabá	2020	Série B	8	0	—		—		—		—		8	0
Mirassol	2020	Série D	21	11	—		—		—		—		21	11
Mirassol	2021	Série C	3	1	13	3	1	0	—		—		17	4
Mirassol	2022	Série C	0	0	12	5	2	1	—		—		14	6
Mirassol	Total		24	12	25	8	3	1	—		—		52	21
América Mineiro (loan)	2021	Série A	22	3	—		—		—		—		22	3
Coritiba	2022	Série A	28	3	—		—		—		—		28	3
Coritiba	2023	Série A	0	0	7	0	0	0	—		—		7	0
Coritiba	2024	Série B	0	0	5	0	0	0	—		—		5	0
Coritiba	Total		28	3	12	0	0	0	—		—		40	3
Sport Recife (loan)	2023	Série B	23	4	—		1	0	—		—		24	4
Novorizontino (loan)	2024	Série B	23	3	5	2	—		—		—		28	5
São Bernardo	2025	Série C	0	0	12	5	—		—		—		12	5
Career total			129	23	74	22	4	1	0	0	24	3	231	51

== Honours ==
Mirassol

- Campeonato Brasileiro Série D: 2020
