= Lucas Ronier =

Brazilian footballer (born 2004)

Personal information
- Full name: Lucas Ronier Vieira Pires
- Date of birth: 26 November 2004 (age 21)
- Place of birth: Fazenda Rio Grande, Brazil
- Height: 1.63 m (5 ft 4 in)
- Position: Forward

Team information
- Current team: Coritiba
- Number: 11

Youth career
- 2013–2023: Coritiba

Senior career*
Years	Team	Apps	(Gls)
2023–	Coritiba	99	(15)
- * Club domestic league appearances and goals as of 7 April 2026

Lucas Ronier Vieira Pires (born 26 November 2004), known as Lucas Ronier, is a Brazilian footballer who plays as a forward for Coritiba.

== Career ==
Born in Fazenda Rio Grande, Paraná, Lucas Ronier joined Coritiba's youth setup in 2013, aged eight. On 19 December 2022, he signed a new contract with the club, being also promoted to the first team.

Lucas Ronier made his professional – and Série A – debut on 3 December 2023, coming on as a late substitute for Robson in a 1–0 away loss against Red Bull Bragantino, as his side were already relegated. He scored his first senior goal the following 9 March, netting his team's second in a 2–0 Campeonato Paranaense home win over Cianorte.

On 19 June 2024, after establishing himself as a starter for Coritiba, Lucas Ronier renewed his contract with the club until December 2027.

== Career statistics ==
As of 15 December 2025

Club	Season	League			State League		Cup		Continental		Other		Total	
Club	Season	Division	Apps	Goals	Apps	Goals	Apps	Goals	Apps	Goals	Apps	Goals	Apps	Goals
Coritiba	2023	Série A	2	0	0	0	0	0	—		—		2	0
Coritiba	2024	Série B	35	5	8	1	1	0	—		—		44	6
Coritiba	2025	Série B	29	4	9	2	1	1	—		—		39	7
Career total			66	9	17	3	2	1	0	0	0	0	85	13

== Honours ==
Coritiba

- Campeonato Brasileiro Série B: 2025
