= 2024 Coritiba Foot Ball Club season =

Coritiba Foot Ball Club
2024 season
- Manager: Guto Ferreira (until 4 May); Fábio Matias (13 June–24 July); Jorginho (27 July–13 November); Guila Bossle (from 14 November)
- Stadium: Estádio Couto Pereira
- Série B: 12th
- Top goalscorer: Matheus Frizzo (4)

The 2024 Coritiba Foot Ball Club season is the club's 115th season in existence and the fourth consecutive season in the second division of Brazilian football. In addition to the domestic league, Guarani are participating in this season's editions of the Campeonato Paranaense and the Copa do Brasil.

== Transfers ==
=== In ===
Pos.	Player	Transferred from	Fee	Date	Source
MF	(Brazil) Matheus Frizzo	(Brazil) Tombense	Loan	1 January 2024	
FW	(Brazil) Figueiredo	(Brazil) Vasco da Gama	Loan	11 January 2024	
DF	(Brazil) Bruno Melo	(Brazil) Fortaleza	Loan	2 February 2024	
MF	(Brazil) Brandão	Free agent	Undisclosed	2 February 2024	
FW	(Brazil) Leandro Damião	Free agent	Free	8 February 2024	
DF	(Brazil) Marcelo Benevenuto	(Brazil) Fortaleza	Loan	9 February 2024	
MF	(Brazil) David	(Brazil) Fortaleza	Undisclosed	21 February 2024	
MF	(Brazil) Bernardo	(Brazil) Guarani	Loan return	22 February 2024	
GK	(Brazil) Gabriel Leite	(Brazil) Bangu	Undisclosed	23 February 2024	
MF	(Brazil) Everton Morelli	(Brazil) Maringá	Loan	8 April 2024	
MF	(Brazil) Yago	Free agent	Loan	18 April 2024	
DF	(Brazil) Jhonny	(Brazil) Fluminense FC	Loan	19 April 2024	
MF	(Brazil) Maicky	(Brazil) Brasil de Pelotas	Loan return	3 May 2024	

=== In ===
Pos.	Player	Transferred from	Fee	Date	Source
FW	(Algeria) Islam Slimani	(Belgium) KV Mechelen	Free	1 February 2024	
DF	(Chile) Benjamín Kuscevic	(Brazil) Fortaleza	Loan	8 February 2024	
MF	(Brazil) Maicky	(Brazil) Grêmio Prudente	Undisclosed	1 July 2024	

== Pre-season and friendlies ==
Win Draw Loss

== Competitions ==
=== Overall record ===
Competition	First match	Last match	Starting round	Record							
Competition	First match	Last match	Starting round	Pld	W	D	L	GF	GA	GD	Win %
Série B		December 2024	Matchday 1	0	0	0	0	0	0	+0	—
Campeonato Paranaense				0	0	0	0	0	0	+0	—
Copa do Brasil				0	0	0	0	0	0	+0	—
				0	0	0	0	0	0	+0	—
Total				0	0	0	0	0	0	+0	—

Source: Soccerway

=== Campeonato Brasileiro Série B ===
==== League table ====
Pos	Team	Pld	W	D	L	GF	GA	GD	Pts
10	Avaí	38	14	11	13	34	32	+2	53
11	Amazonas	38	14	10	14	31	37	−6	52
12	Coritiba	38	14	8	16	41	44	−3	50
13	Paysandu	38	12	14	12	41	43	−2	50
14	Botafogo-SP	38	11	12	15	36	51	−15	45

Source: CBF
Rules for classification: 1) points; 2) wins; 3) goal difference; 4) goals scored; 5) head-to-head results (only between 2 teams); 6) fewest red cards; 7) fewest yellow cards; 8) drawing of lots.

==== Results summary ====
Overall								Home						Away					
Pld	W	D	L	GF	GA	GD	Pts	W	D	L	GF	GA	GD	W	D	L	GF	GA	GD
0	0	0	0	0	0	0	0	0	0	0	0	0	0	0	0	0	0	0	0

==== Results by round ====
Round	1
Ground	
Result	
Position	

A = Away; H = Home; W = Win; D = Draw; L = Loss

==== Matches ====
21 April 2024	Ponte Preta	1–1	Coritiba	Campinas
				Stadium: Estádio Moisés Lucarelli

28 April 2024	Coritiba	1–0	Brusque

4 May 2024	Coritiba	0–1	Sport

12 May 2024	Avaí	1–0	Coritiba

15 May 2024	Coritiba	1–0	Guarani

18 May 2024	Novorizontino	0–0	Coritiba	Novo Horizonte
				Stadium: Estádio Doutor Jorge Ismael de Biasi

28 May 2024	Coritiba	3–0	Operário Ferroviário

1 June 2024	Ceará	1–0	Coritiba	Fortaleza
				Stadium: Castelão

8 June 2024	Coritiba	4–2	Ituano

16 June 2024	Goiás	1–1	Coritiba

20 June 2024	Coritiba	1–0	América Mineiro

26 June 2024	Amazonas	v	Coritiba

=== Copa do Brasil ===
23 February 2024 First round	v	Coritiba
