= Gabriel A. Silva =

American academic

Professor Gabriel A. Silva PhD
- Awards: College of Fellows of the American Institute for Medical and Biological Engineering (2016); American Society of Mechanical Engineers (ASME); Y.C. Fung Young Investigator Medal (2008)

Academic background
- Education: University of Toronto (BSc, MSc), University of Illinois (PhD), Northwestern University (postdoctoral degree)

Gabriel Alejandro Silva is an American neuroscientist and bioengineer. He is a Professor of Bioengineering and Faculty Endowed Scholar in Engineering at the Jacobs School of Engineering at the University of California, San Diego (UCSD) as well as the Founding Director of the Center for Engineered Natural Intelligence (CENI) at UCSD.

== Education ==
Silva had his BSc in human physiology and biophysics and MSc in neuroscience from the University of Toronto in Canada. Afterwards, he proceeded to the University of Illinois, Chicago, where he earned his PhD in bioengineering and neurophysiology. He moved to the Department of Neurology in Northwestern University. After having his postdoctoral fellowship on Nanotechnology and Medicine (IBNAM), he joined the University of California, San Diego (UCSD) in 2003.

== Career ==
Silva's early works done during his education for Master's degree includes investigating the physiology of astrocyte neural glial cells in the spinal cord and its injury. During his PhD, he modeled the neurophysiology and calcium dynamics of rod photoreceptors neurons in the retina. His thesis also examined the electrophysiology of the retina using "paired-flash electroretinography."

=== Applied nanotechnology ===
In collaboration with Nanovision Biosciences, Silva's group has been one of several labs involved in the development of a surgically implantable optoelectronic retinal neural prosthesis to restore vision.

== Honors ==
In 2017 Silva was appointed a Jacobs Faculty Endowed Scholar in Engineering, and in 2016 elected into the College of Fellows of the American Institute of Medical and Biological Engineering.... In 2008 he was awarded the YC Fung Young Investigator Award and Medal by the American Society of Mechanical Engineers (ASME)

He was featured in a piece in the San Diego Tribune "A Scientist's Life: 10 Things UCSD's Gabriel Silva Has Done". His work has been featured and written about in numerous news and popular science sources.
