= Jhonata Varela =

Brazilian footballer

Personal information
- Full name: Jhonata Varela da Silva
- Date of birth: 4 July 2000 (age 26)
- Place of birth: Natal, Brazil
- Height: 1.75 m (5 ft 9 in)
- Position: Defensive midfielder

Team information
- Current team: Botafogo-PB
- Number: 5

Youth career
- –2016: ABC
- 2017–2018: → Grêmio (loan)
- 2018–2019: Grêmio

Senior career*
Years	Team	Apps	(Gls)
2017	ABC	4	(0)
2019–2023	Grêmio	8	(0)
2024	Sampaio Corrêa	13	(0)
2025	São José	28	(0)
2026–	Botafogo-PB	31	(1)
- * Club domestic league appearances and goals as of 8 November 2026

Jhonata Varela da Silva (born 4 July 2000), commonly known as Jhonata Varela, is a Brazilian professional footballer who plays as a defensive midfielder and left-back for Botafogo-PB.

== Club career ==
=== Grêmio ===
Born in Natal, Brazil, Jhonata Varela joined the Grêmio's Academy at the age of 16 in 2017.

== Career statistics ==
=== Club ===
As of 25 November 2021.

Club	Season	League			State League		National Cup		Continental		Other		Total	
Club	Season	Division	Apps	Goals	Apps	Goals	Apps	Goals	Apps	Goals	Apps	Goals	Apps	Goals
ABC	2017	Série B	1	0	4 (Note: Appearance(s) in Campeonato Potiguar.)	0	1	0	—		1 (Note: Appearance(s) in Copa do Nordeste.)	0	7	0
Grêmio	2019	Série A	0	0	—		—		—		—		0	0
Grêmio	2020	Série A	0	0	—		—		0	0	—		0	0
Grêmio	2021	Série A	0	0	1 (Note: Appearance(s) in Campeonato Gaúcho.)	0	—		2 (Note: One appearance in Copa Libertadores, one appearance in Copa Sudamericana.)	0	—		3	0
Grêmio	Total		0	0	1	0	0	0	2	0	0	0	3	0
Career total			1	0	5	0	1	0	2	0	1	0	10	0

== Honours ==
Grêmio

- Campeonato Gaúcho: 2021
- Recopa Gaúcha: 2021, 2022
