= Gabriel Leite (footballer, born 1995) =

Brazilian footballer

Personal information
- Full name: Gabriel Leite Borges
- Date of birth: 6 March 1995 (age 31)
- Place of birth: Campo Grande, Brazil
- Height: 1.70 m (5 ft 7 in)
- Position: Midfielder

Team information
- Current team: Campodarsego

Youth career
- 2007–2013: Paulista
- 2014–2015: Palmeiras

Senior career*
Years	Team	Apps	(Gls)
2013–2014	Paulista	5	(1)
2015–2020	Palmeiras	0	(0)
2015	→ Paraná (loan)	3	(0)
2016	→ Criciúma (loan)	11	(0)
2017	→ Osasco Audax (loan)	9	(2)
2017	→ Guarani (loan)	6	(0)
2018	→ Guarani (loan)	0	(0)
2018–2019	→ Red Bull Brasil (loan)	0	(0)
2019–2020	→ Mirassol (loan)	0	(0)
2020–2021	Arzignano	10	(1)
2021	Luparense	6	(0)
2021	Trento	5	(0)
2021	Santa Maria Cilento	0	(0)
2021–2022	Ambrosiana		
2023–2024	Treviso	15	(1)
2024–	Campodarsego		
- * Club domestic league appearances and goals as of 5 May 2024

Gabriel Leite Borges (born 6 March 1995) is a Brazilian professional footballer who plays for Italian Serie D club Campodarsego as a midfielder.

== Club career ==
Born in Campo Grande, Leite joined the youth academy of Paulista at the age of 12. He made his senior debut with the side in 2013, representing the team at Copa São Paulo de Futebol Júnior and Copa Paulista. After featuring five times for the club in Paulista A1 in the following year, he joined Palmeiras on 20 May 2014 for a fee of $ 1.5 million.

After representing the side in 2015 Copa São Paulo de Futebol Júnior, he was promoted to the senior team ahead of the season. In April, Leite was called up to the senior team for a Copa do Brasil match against Sampaio Corrêa. On 1 September, he was loaned out to Paraná for the rest of the season. Eight days later, he made his first team debut, starting in a 2–1 defeat against Botafogo.

On 28 April 2016, Leite was loaned out to Criciúma. After returning from loan, he was deemed surplus to the requirements of Verdão and was subsequently loaned out to Osasco Audax on 14 December.

On 21 May 2017, Leite's contract was extended until December 2019. On 8 June, he was loaned out to Guarani for the remainder of the season. However, he was still suffering from an injury which meant that he could immeadeiately make his debut. By the end of the following month, he completely recovered from his injury.

On 24 May 2018, Leite was loaned out to Red Bull Brasil until mid-2019.
