= Emerson (footballer, born 2002) =

Brazilian footballer

Personal information
- Full name: Emerson Rodrigues Brito
- Date of birth: 6 May 2002 (age 24)
- Place of birth: Santa Cruz do Sul, Brazil
- Height: 1.75 m (5 ft 9 in)
- Positions: Left winger; right winger

Youth career
- 2019: Esportivo
- 2020–2021: Grêmio

Senior career*
Years	Team	Apps	(Gls)
2020	Esportivo	9	(0)
2021–2022	Grêmio	7	(0)
2021	→ Esportivo (loan)	0	(0)
2023	Javor-Matis	0	(0)
2023	Pouso Alegre	1	(0)
- * Club domestic league appearances and goals as of 26 August 2023

Emerson Rodrigues Brito (born 6 May 2002), commonly known as Emerson, is a Brazilian professional footballer who plays as a left-winger and right-winger.

== Club career ==
=== Grêmio ===
Born in Santa Cruz do Sul, Brazil, Emerson joined the Grêmio's Academy at the age of 18 in 2020.

Emerson is currently playing in Serbia, for the Serbian Superliga side Javor-Matis.

== Career statistics ==
=== Club ===
As of 26 May 2021.

Appearances and goals by club, season and competition
Club	Season	League			National Cup		Continental		Other		Total	
Club	Season	Division	Apps	Goals	Apps	Goals	Apps	Goals	Apps	Goals	Apps	Goals
Esportivo	2020	State	—		—		—		4 (Note: Appearance(s) in Campeonato Gaúcho.)	1	4	1
Esportivo	Total		0	0	0	0	0	0	4	1	4	1
Grêmio	2021	Série A	—		—		—		—		0	0
Grêmio	Total		0	0	0	0	0	0	0	0	0	0
Esportivo (loan)	2021	Série D	—		1	0	—		8	0	9	0
Esportivo (loan)	Total		0	0	1	0	0	0	8	0	9	0
Career total			0	0	1	0	0	0	12	1	13	1

== Honours ==
Grêmio

- Recopa Gaúcha: 2022
