= Kauê Canela =

Brazilian footballer

Personal information
- Full name: Kauê Canela Arroula
- Date of birth: 20 February 2004 (age 22)
- Place of birth: Orlândia, Brazil
- Height: 1.80 m (5 ft 11 in)
- Position: Forward

Team information
- Current team: Fortaleza
- Number: 40

Youth career
- 2018: Sertãozinho
- 2019–2024: Novorizontino
- 2021: → São Paulo (loan)
- 2024: → Fortaleza (loan)
- 2025: Fortaleza

Senior career*
Years	Team	Apps	(Gls)
2020–2024	Novorizontino	0	(0)
2025–	Fortaleza	2	(0)
2025–	→ Botafogo-PB (loan)	7	(0)
- * Club domestic league appearances and goals as of 30 July 2025

Kauê Canela Arroula (born 20 February 2004), known as Kauê Canela, is a Brazilian professional footballer who plays as a forward for Fortaleza.

== Career ==
Born in Orlândia, São Paulo, Kauê Canela began his career with Sertãozinho before moving to the youth sides of Novorizontino in 2019. He made his senior debut at the age of 17 on 21 November 2020, coming on as a late substitute in a 3–0 away loss to Marília, for the year's Copa Paulista.

Kauê Canela moved to São Paulo on loan in 2021, playing for their under-17 squad before returning to his parent club in the following year. In 2024, he impressed with the latter's under-20 squad in the year's Copa São Paulo de Futebol Júnior, reaching the semi-finals of the tournament.

On 29 February 2024, Kauê Canela was loaned to Fortaleza, being assigned to the under-20 team. In September, he was called up to the main squad by head coach Juan Pablo Vojvoda to complete trainings.

On 15 January 2025, Fortaleza exercised Kauê Canela's buyout clause, signing a three-year deal for a rumoured fee of R$ 500,000; he was also included in the pre-season with the main squad. He made his first team debut with the club ten days later, replacing Renato Kayzer late into a 3–1 Campeonato Cearense away win over Horizonte. On February 28, Canela was loaned to Botafogo-PB.

== Career statistics ==
As of 28 January 2025

Appearances and goals by club, season and competition
Club	Season	League			State League		Cup		Continental		Other		Total	
Club	Season	Division	Apps	Goals	Apps	Goals	Apps	Goals	Apps	Goals	Apps	Goals	Apps	Goals
Novorizontino	2020	Série D	—		—		—		—		1 (Note: Appearance(s) in Copa Paulista)	0	1	0
Novorizontino	2023	Série B	0	0	0	0	—		—		—		0	0
Novorizontino	2024	Série B	0	0	0	0	—		—		—		0	0
Novorizontino	Total		0	0	0	0	0	0	0	0	1	0	1	0
Fortaleza	2025	Série A	0	0	2	0	0	0	0	0	0	0	2	0
Career total			0	0	2	0	0	0	0	0	1	0	3	0
