= Rondinelli da Silva =

Brazilian footballer

Personal information
- Full name: Rondinelli da Silva Vieira
- Date of birth: 11 March 1999 (age 27)
- Place of birth: Rio de Janeiro, Brazil
- Height: 1.87 m (6 ft 2 in)
- Position: Striker

Youth career
- 2009–2015: Fluminense
- 2015–2020: Grêmio

Senior career*
Years	Team	Apps	(Gls)
2019–2022	Grêmio	3	(0)
2020	→ Caxias (loan)	9	(1)
2021	→ Paraná (loan)	8	(1)
2022	Novo Hamburbo	8	(1)
2022	Ponte Preta	5	(0)
2023	Brasil de Pelotas	27	(2)
2024	Itabirito	8	(1)
2024	Southern	0	(0)
- * Club domestic league appearances and goals as of 13 July 2024

Rondinelli da Silva Vieira (born 11 March 1999), commonly known as Rondinelli da Silva or simply Da Silva, is a Brazilian professional footballer who plays as a striker.

== Club career ==
=== Grêmio ===
Born in Rio de Janeiro, Brazil, Da Silva joined the Grêmio's Academy at the age of 16 in 2015.

=== Southern ===
On 11 July 2024, Da Silva joined Hong Kong Premier League club Southern. However, he left the club only 2 days after the announcement.

== Career statistics ==
=== Club ===
As of 25 May 2021

Appearances and goals by club, season and competition
Club	Season	League			National Cup		Continental		Other		Total	
Club	Season	Division	Apps	Goals	Apps	Goals	Apps	Goals	Apps	Goals	Apps	Goals
Grêmio	2019	Série A	3	0	0	0	—		—		3	0
Grêmio	2020	Série A	—		—		0	0	—		0	0
Grêmio	2021	Série A	—		—		—		—		0	0
Grêmio	Total		3	0	0	0	0	0	0	0	3	0
Caxias (loan)	2020	Série D	—		—		—		8 (Note: Appearance(s) in Campeonato Gaúcho.)	1	8	1
Caxias (loan)	Total		0	0	0	0	0	0	8	1	8	1
Paraná (loan)	2021	Série C	—		—		—		7 (Note: Appearance(s) in Campeonato Paranaense.)	1	7	1
Paraná (loan)	Total		0	0	0	0	0	0	7	1	7	1
Career total			3	0	0	0	0	0	15	2	18	2
