= Central de Minas =

- Municipality
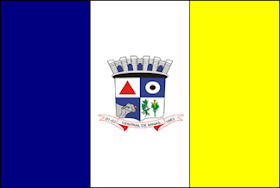
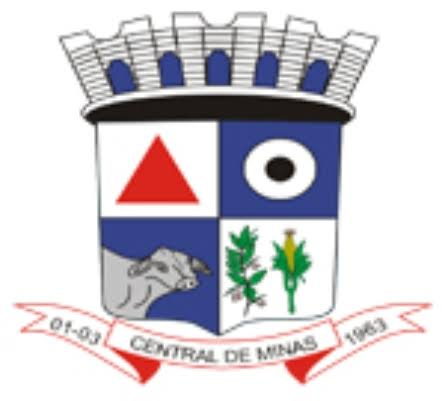
- Flag Coat of arms

- Location in Brazil
- Coordinates: 18°45′43″S 41°18′21″W
- Country: Brazil
- Region: Southeast
- State: Minas Gerais
- Mesoregion: Vale do Rio Doce

Population (2020)
  - Total: 7,046
- Time zone: UTC−3 (BRT)

Central de Minas is a municipality in the state of Minas Gerais in the Southeast region of Brazil.

== See also ==
- List of municipalities in Minas Gerais
