= Éberth =

Brazilian footballer (born 2003)

Personal information
- Full name: Éberth Araújo Nogueira
- Date of birth: 19 June 2003 (age 23)
- Place of birth: Bom Jesus da Lapa, Brazil
- Height: 1.93 m (6 ft 4 in)
- Position: Forward

Team information
- Current team: Coritiba

Youth career
- 2016: Palmeiras
- 2017–2023: Goiás
- 2022–2023: → Coritiba (loan)

Senior career*
Years	Team	Apps	(Gls)
2023	Goiás	0	(0)
2023	→ Coritiba (loan)	1	(0)
2024–	Coritiba	12	(2)
2025	→ Chapecoense (loan)		
2025–2026	→ União de Santarém (loan)	17	(3)
- * Club domestic league appearances and goals as of 7 May 2026

Éberth Araújo Nogueira (born 19 June 2003), simply known as Éberth, is a Brazilian footballer who plays as a forward for Coritiba.

== Career ==
Born in Bom Jesus da Lapa, Bahia, Éberth played for the youth sides of Palmeiras and Goiás, renewing his contract with the latter on 19 April 2022. On 2 July, however, he was loaned to Coritiba and was initially assigned to the under-20 squad.

Éberth made his professional – and Série A – debut on 6 December 2023, coming on as a second-half substitute for Edu in a 2–0 home loss to Corinthians, as his side were already relegated. Late in the month, the club exercised his buyout clause, and he was definitely promoted to the first team.

== Career statistics ==
As of 2 January 2024

Club	Season	League			State League		Cup		Continental		Other		Total	
Club	Season	Division	Apps	Goals	Apps	Goals	Apps	Goals	Apps	Goals	Apps	Goals	Apps	Goals
Coritiba	2023	Série A	1	0	—		—		—		—		1	0
Career total			1	0	0	0	0	0	0	0	0	0	1	0
