= Tiago Cóser =

Brazilian footballer

Personal information
- Date of birth: 16 January 2004 (age 22)
- Place of birth: Chapecó, Brazil
- Height: 1.87 m (6 ft 2 in)
- Position: Centre-back

Team information
- Current team: Coritiba
- Number: 23

Youth career
- 2013–2021: Chapecoense

Senior career*
| Years | Team | Apps | (Gls) |
| 2021 | Chapecoense | 12 | (0) |
| 2022–2023 | Benfica B | 4 | (0) |
| 2025– | Coritiba | 24 | (1) |
- * Club domestic league appearances and goals as of 7 April 2026

Tiago Cóser (born 16 January 2004), sometimes known just as Tiago, is a Brazilian professional footballer who plays as a centre-back for Coritiba.

== Career statistics ==
=== Club ===
As of 26 January 2023.

Appearances and goals by club, season and competition
| Club | Season | League | | | Cup | | Continental | | Other | | Total | |
| Club | Season | Division | Apps | Goals | Apps | Goals | Apps | Goals | Apps | Goals | Apps | Goals |
|---|---|---|---|---|---|---|---|---|---|---|---|---|
| Chapecoense | 2021 | Série A | 2 | 0 | 0 | 0 | — | | 10 (Note: Appearances in the Campeonato Catarinense) | 0 | 12 | 0 |
| Benfica B | 2021–22 | Liga Portugal 2 | 0 | 0 | – | | — | | 0 | 0 | 0 | 0 |
| Benfica B | 2022–23 | Liga Portugal 2 | 4 | 0 | – | | — | | 0 | 0 | 4 | 0 |
| Benfica B | Total | | 4 | 0 | 0 | 0 | 0 | 0 | 0 | 0 | 4 | 0 |
| Career total | | | 6 | 0 | 0 | 0 | 0 | 0 | 10 | 0 | 16 | 0 |
