= Joaquín Lavega =

Uruguayan footballer (born 2005)

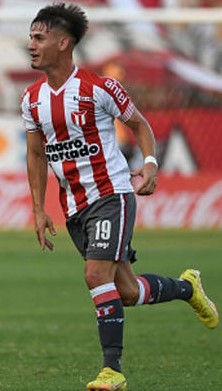

Personal information
- Full name: Joaquín Lavega Colzada
- Date of birth: 3 February 2005 (age 21)
- Place of birth: Montevideo, Uruguay
- Height: 1.72 m (5 ft 8 in)
- Position: Forward

Team information
- Current team: Coritiba (on loan from Fluminense)
- Number: 7

Senior career*
Years	Team	Apps	(Gls)
2021–2024	River Plate Montevideo	89	(13)
2025–	Fluminense	2	(0)
2026–	→ Coritiba (loan)	16	(2)

International career
2019	Uruguay U15	17	(2)
2022–2025	Uruguay U20	23	(7)
2023–	Uruguay U23	4	(0)
- * Club domestic league appearances and goals as of 7 April 2026

Joaquín Lavega Colzada (born 3 February 2005) is a Uruguayan professional footballer who plays as a forward for Campeonato Brasileiro Série A club Coritiba, on loan from Fluminense.

== Club career ==
Lavega is a youth academy graduate of River Plate Montevideo. He made his professional debut for the club on 30 May 2021 in a goalless draw against Deportivo Maldonado.

In September 2022, he was named by English newspaper The Guardian as one of the best players born in 2005 worldwide.

In December 2024, Fluminense announced that they reached an agreement for Lavega to become their newest player. The forward was close to signing with rival club Vasco da Gama, but then he changed his mind and signed a five-year contract with the tricolor.

== International career ==
=== Youth ===
Lavega has represented Uruguay at different youth levels. He was part of Uruguay squad at the 2019 South American U-15 Championship. On 15 August 2021, Uruguay under-17 team coach Diego Demarco named Lavega in 20-man squad for the 2021 U-18 L'Alcúdia International Football Tournament.

On 28 September 2023, Lavega was named in Uruguay's squad for the 2023 Pan American Games. In January 2025, he was named in Uruguay's 23-man squad for the 2025 South American U-20 Championship.

=== Senior ===
In October 2024, Lavega received his first call-up to the Uruguay national team.

== Career statistics ==
As of 29 September 2022

Appearances and goals by club, season and competition
Club	Season	League			Cup		Continental		Total	
Club	Season	Division	Apps	Goals	Apps	Goals	Apps	Goals	Apps	Goals
River Plate Montevideo	2021	Uruguayan Primera División	4	0	—		—		4	0
River Plate Montevideo	2022	Uruguayan Primera División	17	1	2	0	2 (Note: Appearances in Copa Sudamericana.)	1	21	2
Career total			21	1	2	0	2	1	25	2
