= Wallisson =

Brazilian footballer

Personal information
- Full name: Wallisson Luiz Alves Máximo
- Date of birth: 23 September 1997 (age 29)
- Place of birth: Central de Minas, Brazil
- Height: 1.84 m (6 ft 0 in)
- Position: Midfielder

Team information
- Current team: Mirassol
- Number: 80

Youth career
- 2016: Holanda
- 2017: Portuguesa-RJ

Senior career*
Years	Team	Apps	(Gls)
2015	União Luziense	3	(0)
2015–2016	Holanda	0	(0)
2018–2019	Democrata	17	(0)
2018	→ Ponte Nova (loan)	8	(0)
2019	Serra Macaense	0	(0)
2019	→ Volta Redonda (loan)	1	(0)
2020–2021	Volta Redonda	35	(0)
2021	Nova Venécia	0	(0)
2022	Athletic-MG	12	(0)
2022	Ponte Preta	30	(5)
2023	Cruzeiro	19	(0)
2023–2024	Moreirense	11	(0)
2024–2025	Athletic-MG	16	(0)
2024	→ América Mineiro (loan)	20	(0)
2025	→ Coritiba (loan)	30	(1)
2026	Coritiba	12	(0)
2026–	Mirassol	0	(0)
- * Club domestic league appearances and goals as of 7 April 2026

Wallisson Luiz Alves Máximo (born 23 September 1997), simply known as Wallisson, is a Brazilian professional footballer who plays as a midfielder for club Mirassol.

== Club career ==
Born in Central de Minas, Minas Gerais, Wallisson began his career with local side União Luziense in 2015. He moved to Holanda later in the year, appearing for the club in the 2015 Copa Amazonas.

Wallison played for the under-20 side of Holanda during the 2016 season, as the club did not have a senior squad active. He represented Portuguesa-RJ in 2017, also in the under-20 category.

In November 2017, Wallisson was included in Democrata's squad for the 2018 Campeonato Mineiro. He was subsequently loaned to Ponte Nova, before returning to Democrata in January 2019.

On 7 May 2019, Wallisson was presented at Volta Redonda, on loan from Serra Macaense. He signed a permanent deal with Voltaço on 7 October, and was regularly used afterwards.

On 11 January 2022, after a short period at Nova Venécia (where he won the Copa Espírito Santo), Wallisson signed for Athletic-MG. On 12 April, he moved to Série B side Ponte Preta.

On 4 August 2022, after already becoming a starter for Ponte, Wallisson renewed his contract with the club until 2027. In December, however, he terminated his link after alleging unpaid wages.

On 20 December 2022, Wallisson was announced at newly promoted to Série A side Cruzeiro. The following 28 August, recently promoted to Primeira Liga club Moreirense announced the signing of Wallisson on a four-year contract.

On 5 January 2024, after having failed to establish himself as a starter for Moreirense, Wallisson returned to Brazil, signing for recently promoted to Série C side Athletic-MG.

== Career statistics ==
As of match played 29 July 2023

Club	Season	League			State league		National cup		League cup		Other		Total	
Club	Season	Division	Apps	Goals	Apps	Goals	Apps	Goals	Apps	Goals	Apps	Goals	Apps	Goals
União Luziense	2015	—	—		3 (Note: Appearance(s) in Campeonato Mineiro Segunda Divisão)	0	—		—		—		3	0
Holanda	2015	—	—		—		—		—		2 (Note: Appearance(s) in Copa Amazonas)	0	2	0
Democrata	2018	—	—		9 (Note: Appearance(s) in Campeonato Mineiro)	0	—		—		—		9	0
Democrata	2019	—	—		8 (Note: Appearance(s) in Campeonato Mineiro Módulo II)	0	—		—		—		8	0
Democrata	Total		—		17	0	—		—		—		17	0
Ponte Nova (loan)	2018	—	—		8 (Note: Appearance(s) in Campeonato Mineiro Segunda Divisão)	0	—		—		—		8	0
Serra Macaense	2019	—	—		—		—		—		—		—	
Volta Redonda (loan)	2019	Série C	1	0	—		—		—		2 (Note: Appearance(s) in Copa Rio)	0	3	0
Volta Redonda	2020	Série C	10	0	11 (Note: Appearance(s) in Campeonato Carioca)	0	1	0	—		—		22	0
Volta Redonda	2021	Série C	5	0	9	0	2	0	—		1	0	17	0
Volta Redonda	Total		16	0	20	0	3	0	—		3	0	42	0
Nova Venécia	2021	—	—		—		—		—		5 (Note: Appearance(s) in Copa Espírito Santo)	0	5	0
Athletic	2022	—	—		12	0	—		—		—		12	0
Ponte Preta	2022	Série B	30	5	—		—		—		—		30	5
Cruzeiro	2023	Série A	11	0	8	0	3	0	—		—		22	0
Moreirense	2023–24	Primeira Liga	0	0	—		0	0	0	0	0	0	0	0
Career total			57	5	68	0	6	0	0	0	10	0	141	5

== Honours ==
Nova Venécia

- Copa Espírito Santo: 2021
