= Gabriel Silva (footballer, born July 2002) =

Brazilian footballer (born 2002)

Personal information
- Full name: Gabriel Silva Azevedo Figueredo
- Date of birth: 3 July 2002 (age 24)
- Place of birth: São Paulo, Brazil
- Height: 1.78 m (5 ft 10 in)
- Positions: Attacking midfielder; forward

Team information
- Current team: Cianorte

Youth career
- 2017: Diadema
- 2018–2019: São Caetano
- 2019–2022: Grêmio

Senior career*
Years	Team	Apps	(Gls)
2022–2025	Grêmio	35	(4)
2023	→ Coritiba (loan)	4	(0)
2024	→ Inter de Limeira (loan)	4	(0)
2024	→ Sampaio Corrêa (loan)	13	(1)
2025	→ Hercílio Luz (loan)	7	(1)
2025	Vora	0	(0)
2026–	Cianorte	2	(0)
- * Club domestic league appearances and goals as of 01:17, 10 February 2026 (UTC)

Gabriel Silva Azevedo Figueredo (born 3 July 2002), known as Gabriel Silva, is a Brazilian professional footballer who plays as an attacking midfielder or forward for Cianorte.

== Career ==
Gabriel Silva started his career with Grêmio.

== Honours ==
Grêmio

- Campeonato Gaúcho: 2022, 2023
- Recopa Gaúcha: 2022, 2023
