= Estádio Couto Pereira =

Football stadium in Curitiba, Brazil

Coordinates: 25°25′16″S 49°15′34″W

Estádio Major Antônio Couto Pereira
- Couto Pereira
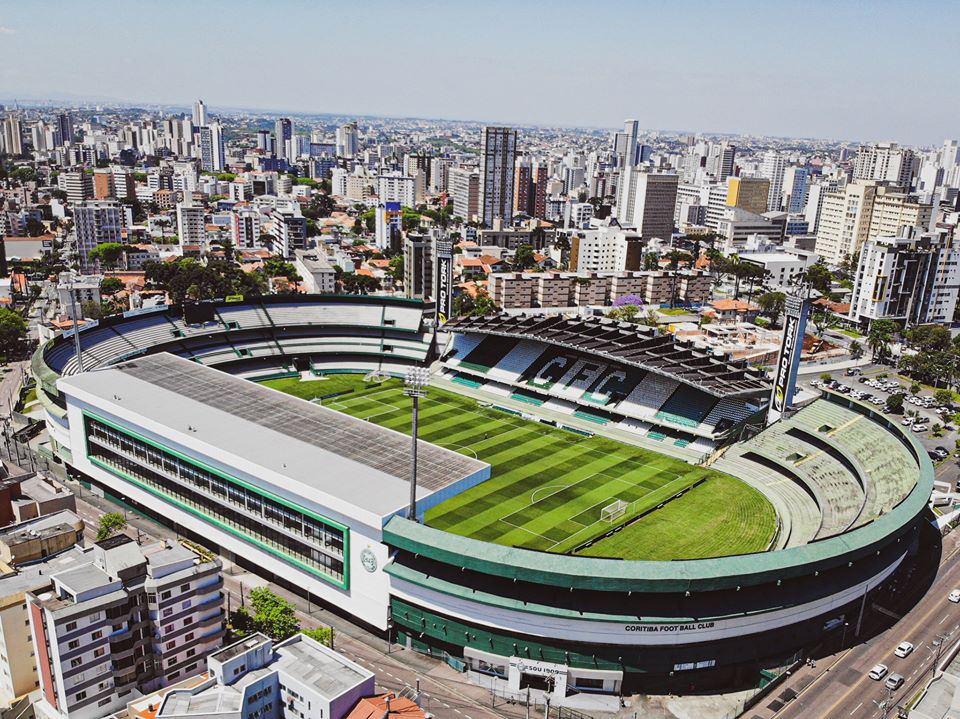
- Sisbrace
- Interactive map of Estádio Major Antônio Couto Pereira
- Full name: Estádio Major Antônio Couto Pereira
- Former names: Estádio Belford Duarte
- Location: Rua Ubaldino do Amaral, 37, Curitiba, PR, Brazil
- Owner: Coritiba
- Operator: Coritiba
- Capacity: 40,502
- Surface: Grass
- Record attendance: 70,000
- Field size: 109 x 72 m

Construction
- Built: 1927–1932
- Opened: 20 November 1932
- Renovated: 2005, 2014
- Expanded: 2014

Estádio Major Antônio Couto Pereira, often shortened to Couto Pereira, is the home of Coritiba Foot Ball Club, located in Curitiba, Paraná state, Brazil. Its formal name honors Major Antônio Couto Pereira, who was Coritiba's president in 1926, 1927, and between 1930 and 1933. He started the stadium construction.

== History ==
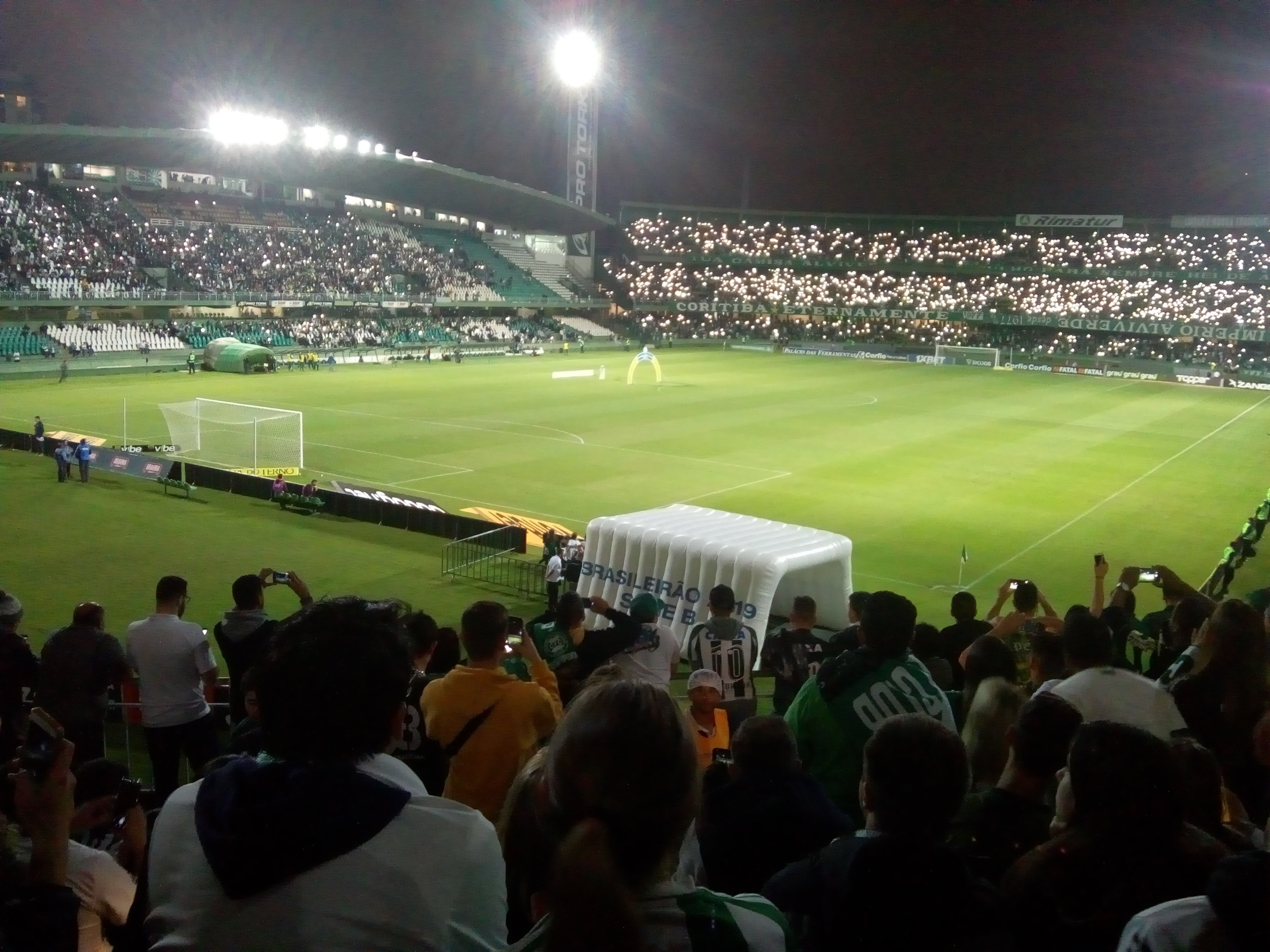
Couto Pereira during a night match in 2019

In 1927, Major Antônio Couto Pereira, the club's president at that time, acquired a 36,300 m^{2} area, paying for it a hundred contos de réis. Between the groundplot purchase, which should also accommodate the club's headquarters at the Alto da Glória neighborhood, and the stadium construction, almost five years passed.

The stadium was originally named after Belfort Duarte,. The stadium was named after Belfort Duarte because the Coritiba counselors did not come to an agreement about the stadium name. The name Belfort Duarte was chosen by president Couto Pereira as a provisory name, which lasted 45 years.

The stadium floodlights were inaugurated in 1942, when Coritiba beat Avaí 4–2.

On 28 February 1977, a General Assembly renamed the stadium to Major Antônio Couto Pereira, after the club's former president died.

In 1988 a ditch around the pitch was built, to prevent supporters from entering the field, and to give a more modern look to the stadium. At the same time the cabins were built, which reduced the stadium capacity, but also made it more comfortable.

The inaugural match was played on 20 November 1932, when Coritiba beat América 4–2. The first goal of the stadium was scored by Coritiba's Gildo.

The stadium's attendance record in a football match currently stands at 80,000 set on August 18, 1998 when Coritiba beat São Paulo 2–1.

The stadium's general attendance record was set on August 5, 1980, when 70,000 people came to see Pope John Paul II.

Coldplay performed at the stadium on March 21 and 22, 2023, as part of their Music of the Spheres World Tour, becoming the first headline artist to play the venue twice.

System of a Down holds the stadium record for revenue and attendance per concert, grossing $4,315,805 from 44,000 spectators on May 6, 2025, as part of the Wake Up! South America Stadium Tour.

Bruno Mars performed at the stadium on October 31 and November 1, 2024, as part of the Bruno Mars 2022-2024 Tour.

Olivia Rodrigo performed at the stadium on March 26, 2025, as part of the Guts World Tour: Spilled. It was her first ever performance in Brazil and the first ever stadium performance of her career.

On November 5, 2025, Linkin Park performed a show at the stadium as part of the arena tour promoting their comeback album, From Zero.

== Structure ==
With the inauguration of the Pro-Tork Sector on Mauá Street and the construction of a new exit at the back curve, Couto Pereira now has an official capacity approved by the Fire Department for 40,502 spectators, distributed as follows:

- Coritiba Bleachers: 17,473
- Visitor Bleachers: 4,007
- Pro Tork Seats: 4,443
- Pro Tork Skyboxes: 456
- Mauá Seats: 6,770
- Lower Social Seats: 2,019
- Upper Social Seats: 4,673
- Tribune Honor Seats: 202
- Lower/Upper Skyboxes: 377
- Press Cabins: 82

In the stadium, there are forty-three restrooms, twenty for females and twenty-three for males. Additionally, there are twenty snack bars and five locker rooms (Coritiba, visitor, female and male referees, and doping control), along with a parking lot with 400 spaces. For security, there are one hundred and twenty-seven cameras and a monitoring center overseeing the movement of spectators.

The field has dimensions of 105 x 69 meters, with Bermuda 419 grass.

== The Stadium ==
All seats in Coritiba's Stadium are numbered. A ticket system using magnetic media and electronic turnstiles allows for the stadium's segmentation, achieved through color identification.

During the current phase of renovations, approximately fifteen thousand new seats have been installed in various sections, enhancing comfort and safety.

Adjacent to the stadium is the "Sou 1909" store, selling licensed products and sports materials related to Coritiba, featuring the club's "1909" brand.

The Couto Pereira Stadium is equipped with elevators for press and authorities to access the upper seats.

== Renovation in 2005 ==
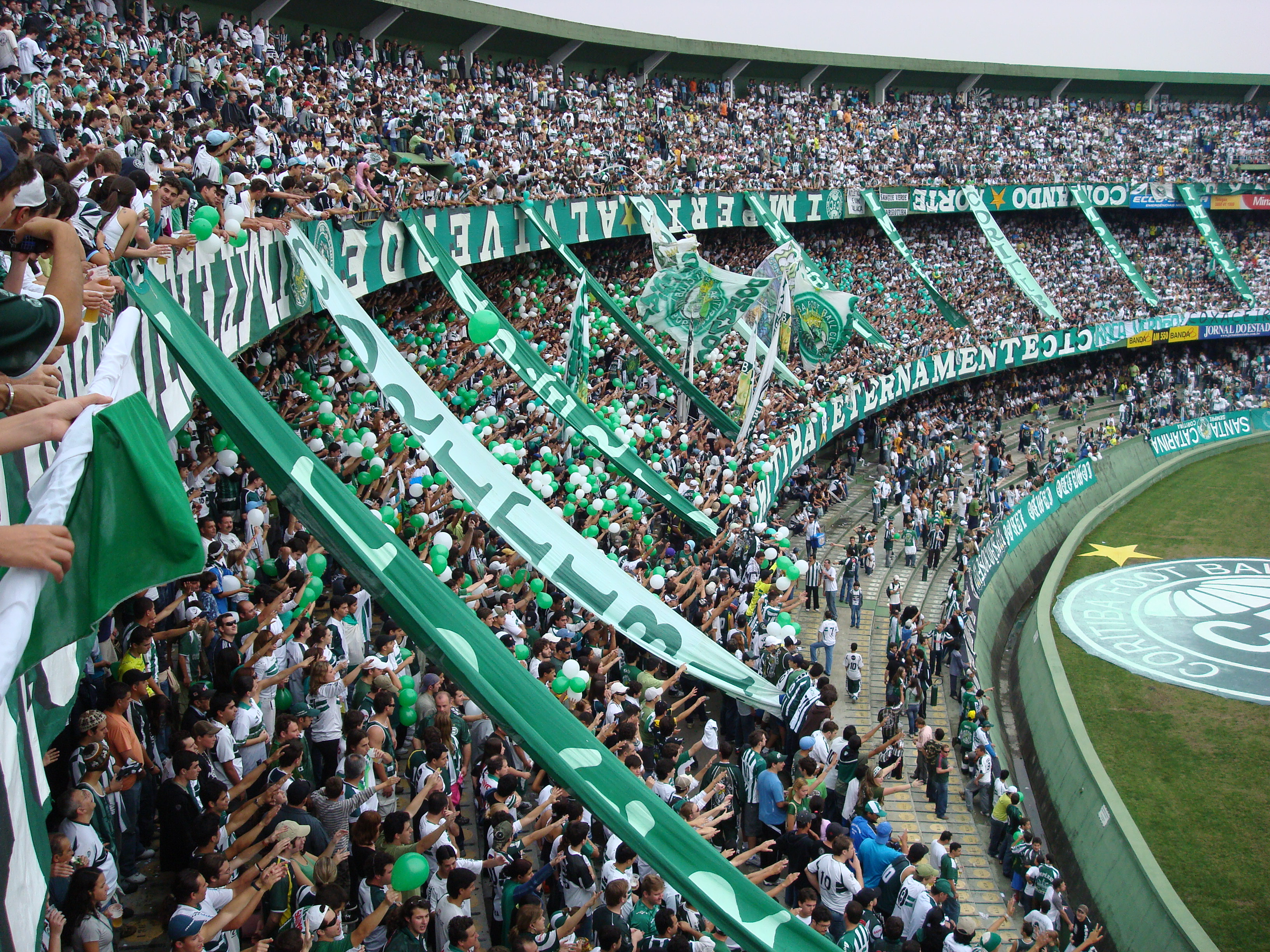
The inside look of the stadium in the "Amâncio Môro" grandstand section, designated for the Império Alviverde Organized Fan Club.

On May 1, 2005, after over five months of construction, the stadium was reopened.

A new Bermuda 419 grass, regarded by experts as the best for football, was planted, accompanied by a more efficient drainage system.

The field dimensions were expanded to 109 x 72 meters, and the barriers around the moat were removed, ensuring perfect visibility of the game from any part of the stadium.

The new goalposts feature redesigned support bars for the nets, enhancing player safety.

The new reserve benches meet FIFA's international standards, providing comfortable conditions for athletes. They are Recaro-style benches, similar to those used in the Barcelona and Ajax stadiums.

In 2005, 25 high-standard luxury boxes were introduced, equipped with amenities such as TV, air conditioning, minibar, granite flooring, private bathroom, bulletproof glass isolation, recliners, and waiter service via intercom. In total, 370 people can attend matches at Couto Pereira using these boxes.

A new press room was constructed for pre and post-match interviews, equipped with a sound system and internet access.

== Trophy Walkway ==
The Couto Pereira Stadium features two spaces that honor the former president Amâncio Moro and the ex-player of América, Belfort Duarte, who for over forty years lent his name to the stadium in Curitiba.

These two spaces boast modern facilities with food courts. The Belfort Duarte area includes a gallery where photos and 75 of the club's key trophies will be showcased. Among them are the 1985 Brazilian Champion and the 1973 Champion of the People's Tournament.

Gigantic photographic panels depicting various phases of Couto Pereira, from its construction through various renovations, adorn the environment with its entire floor made of Labrador green granite.

The gallery project was executed by the Coxa-Branca architect Ricardo Carvalho. Each display case accommodates between twelve and twenty trophies, carefully selected from the club's major accomplishments over more than 100 years. A group of fans and researchers, The Hellenics, conducted the historical survey that sheds light on Coritiba's victorious history. The group includes journalist Vinícius Coelho, researcher Levi Mulfort, and fans Pierre Alexandre Boulos, Guilherme Straube, Alan Roger da Silva, and Maurício Pasternack.
