= Rodrigo Gelado =

Brazilian footballer

Personal information
- Full name: Rodrigo Silva Nascimento
- Date of birth: 28 September 2003 (age 23)
- Place of birth: Salvador, Brazil
- Height: 1.82 m (6 ft 0 in)
- Position: Left-back

Team information
- Current team: Coritiba
- Number: 66

Youth career
- 2021: SESP Samambaense
- 2022: Taguatinga
- 2022–2023: Vila Nova

Senior career*
Years	Team	Apps	(Gls)
2021	SESP Samambaense	4	(1)
2022	Taguatinga	1	(0)
2023–2024	Vila Nova	46	(2)
2024–	Coritiba	35	(1)
2025–2026	→ Athletic Club (loan)	27	(0)
- * Club domestic league appearances and goals as of 16:24, 14 September 2026 (UTC)

Rodrigo Silva Nascimento (born 28 September 2003), known as Rodrigo Gelado, is a Brazilian footballer who plays as a left back for Coritiba in the Campeonato Brasileiro Série A.

== Career ==
Born in Salvador, Bahia, Rodrigo Gelado played amateur football in his hometown before moving to the Federal District. He began his career with SESP Samambaense in 2021, and made his senior debut with the club in the Campeonato Brasiliense Second Division.

Rodrigo Gelado began the 2022 season with Taguatinga, playing for the under-20 squad and featuring in one Campeonato Brasiliense match before moving to Vila Nova, where he was also assigned to the under-20s. He made his first team debut with the latter on 18 January 2023, starting in a 1–1 Campeonato Goiano away draw against CRAC.

Rodrigo Gelado scored his first goal for Vila on 25 January 2023, netting his side's third in a 3–0 home win over Iporá. On 24 February, already established as a regular starter, he renewed his contract until 2025.

In April 2023, Rodrigo Gelado was named the 2023 Campeonato Goiano Breakthrough Player, and remained a starter in the 2023 Série B.

== Career statistics ==
As of 5 December 2023.

Club	Season	League			State League		Cup		Continental		Other		Total	
Club	Season	Division	Apps	Goals	Apps	Goals	Apps	Goals	Apps	Goals	Apps	Goals	Apps	Goals
SESP Samambaense	2021	Brasiliense 2ª Divisão	—		4	1	—		—		—		4	1
Taguatinga	2022	Brasiliense	—		1	0	—		—		—		1	0
Vila Nova	2023	Série B	35	1	11	1	2	0	—		3 (Note: Appearance(s) in Copa Verde)	0	51	2
Career total			35	1	16	2	2	0	0	0	3	0	56	3
