= Gabriel Leite (footballer, born 1987) =

Brazilian footballer

Personal information
- Full name: Gabriel Christoni Leite
- Date of birth: December 28, 1987 (age 38)
- Place of birth: Curitiba-PR, Brazil
- Height: 1.87 m (6 ft 2 in)
- Position: Goalkeeper

Team information
- Current team: Coritiba
- Number: 87

Youth career
- 2005: Paraná

Senior career*
Years	Team	Apps	(Gls)
2006–2011	Paraná	31	(0)
2009	→ São Bento (loan)	0	(0)
2009	→ Ituano (loan)	0	(0)
2010	→ União Barbarense (loan)	19	(0)
2011	Oeste	4	(0)
2011–2017	Luverdense	91	(1)
2012	→ Operário Ferroviário (loan)	6	(0)
2012	→ Atlético Sorocaba (loan)	1	(0)
2012–2013	→ Boa Esporte(loan)	3	(0)
2015	→ Red Bull Brasil (loan)	4	(0)
2018–2019	Ferroviária	55	(0)
2020	Paysandu	24	(0)
2021	Pelotas	0	(0)
2022	Paraná	0	(0)
2023	São Joseense	13	(0)
2023	Náutico	1	(0)
2024	Bangu	0	(0)
2024–	Coritiba	0	(0)
- * Club domestic league appearances and goals as of 10:45, 3 May 2025 (UTC)

Gabriel Christoni Leite (born December 28, 1987, in Curitiba) is a Brazilian football goalkeeper, who plays for Coritiba.

== Contract ==
- January 1, 2008, to December 31, 2010
