= Geovane (footballer, born 1989) =

Brazilian footballer

Personal information
- Full name: Geovane Batista de Faria
- Date of birth: 20 February 1989 (age 37)
- Place of birth: Pedregulho, Brazil
- Height: 1.79 m (5 ft 10 in)
- Position: Midfielder

Team information
- Current team: Atlético Goianiense

Youth career
- 2007–2008: Francana
- 2007–2008: → Cruzeiro (loan)
- 2008–2009: Goiás

Senior career*
| Years | Team | Apps | (Gls) |
| 2009–2010 | Goiás | 0 | (0) |
| 2010 | → Morrinhos (loan) | 0 | (0) |
| 2010 | → Aparecidense (loan) | 0 | (0) |
| 2011 | Cruzeiro | 0 | (0) |
| 2011 | Vila Nova | 10 | (0) |
| 2012–2016 | Aparecidense | 64 | (6) |
| 2012–2013 | → ASA (loan) | 10 | (0) |
| 2015 | Cuiabá | 6 | (0) |
| 2016–2018 | Vila Nova | 102 | (8) |
| 2019 | Goiás | 38 | (2) |
| 2020–2022 | CSA | 118 | (3) |
| 2023–2024 | Novorizontino | 90 | (10) |
| 2025 | Coritiba | 23 | (0) |
| 2026– | Atlético Goianiense | 9 | (0) |
- * Club domestic league appearances and goals as of 16 April 2026

Geovane Batista de Faria, known simply Geovane (born 20 February 1989), is a footballer who plays as a midfielder for Atlético Goianiense.

== Career statistics ==
As of 13 June 2017

| Club | Season | League | | | State League | | Cup | | Conmebol | | Other | | Total | |
| Club | Season | Division | Apps | Goals | Apps | Goals | Apps | Goals | Apps | Goals | Apps | Goals | Apps | Goals |
|---|---|---|---|---|---|---|---|---|---|---|---|---|---|---|
| Vila Nova | 2011 | Série B | 1 | 0 | — | | 0 | 0 | 0 | 0 | 0 | 0 | 1 | 0 |
| Aparecidense | 2012 | Campeonato Goiano | — | | 12 | 1 | 0 | 0 | 0 | 0 | 0 | 0 | 12 | 1 |
| ASA | 2012 | Série B | 10 | 0 | — | | 0 | 0 | 0 | 0 | 0 | 0 | 10 | 0 |
| ASA | 2013 | n/a | — | | — | | 2 | 0 | 0 | 0 | 2 (Note: Appearances in 2013 Copa do Nordeste) | 0 | 4 | 0 |
| ASA | Subtotal | | 10 | 0 | — | | 2 | 0 | 0 | 0 | 2 | 0 | 14 | 0 |
| Aparecidense | 2013 | Série D | 6 | 2 | — | | 0 | 0 | 0 | 0 | 0 | 0 | 6 | 2 |
| Aparecidense | 2014 | Campeonato Goiano | — | | 9 | 0 | 0 | 0 | 0 | 0 | 0 | 0 | 9 | 0 |
| Aparecidense | 2015 | Campeonato Goiano | — | | 17 | 1 | 0 | 0 | 0 | 0 | 0 | 0 | 17 | 1 |
| Aparecidense | Subtotal | | 6 | 2 | 26 | 1 | 0 | 0 | 0 | 0 | 0 | 0 | 32 | 3 |
| Cuiabá | 2015 | Série C | 6 | 0 | — | | 0 | 0 | 0 | 0 | 0 | 0 | 6 | 0 |
| Aparecidense | 2016 | Série D | 7 | 0 | 7 | 1 | 4 | 1 | 0 | 0 | 2 (Note: appearances in 2016 Copa Verde) | 0 | 20 | 2 |
| Vila Nova | 2016 | Série B | 15 | 0 | — | | 0 | 0 | 0 | 0 | 0 | 0 | 15 | 0 |
| Vila Nova | 2017 | Série B | 7 | 3 | 11 | 1 | 0 | 0 | 0 | 0 | 0 | 0 | 18 | 4 |
| Vila Nova | Subtotal | | 22 | 3 | 11 | 1 | 0 | 0 | 0 | 0 | 0 | 0 | 33 | 4 |
| Career total | | | 52 | 5 | 56 | 4 | 6 | 1 | 0 | 0 | 4 | 0 | 118 | 10 |

== Honours ==
CSA

- Campeonato Alagoano: 2021

== Contract ==
- Goiás.
- Cruzeiro Esporte Clube.
