= List of Coritiba Foot Ball Club records and statistics =

Coritiba Foot Ball Club is a football club based in Curitiba, Paraná. Coritiba's first trophy was the Campeonato Paranaense (Paraná State Cup), which it won against Britânia in 1916. In 1973, Coritiba won Torneio do Povo (Tournament of the People). In 1985, won the mainly tournament of Brazil, Campeonato Brasileiro.

== Titles ==
- Série A: 1

1985

- Série B: 2

2007, 2010

- Torneio do Povo: 1

1973

- Campeonato Paranaense: 38

1916, 1927, 1931, 1933, 1935, 1939, 1941, 1942, 1946, 1947, 1951, 1952, 1954, 1956, 1957, 1959, 1960, 1968, 1969, 1971, 1972, 1973, 1974, 1975, 1976, 1978, 1979, 1986, 1989, 1999, 2003, 2004, 2008, 2010, 2011, 2012, 2013, 2017

- Taça Cidade de Curitiba/Taça Clemente Comandulli: 2

1976, 1978

- Festival Brasileiro de Futebol: 1

1997

- Fita Azul Internacional: 1

1972

- Pierre Colon Trophy (Vichy, France): 1

1969

- Akwaba Trophy (Africa): 1

1983

=== Junior team ===
- Torneio Gradisca (Italia): 2

2013, 2014

- Dallas Cup (United States): 2

2012, 2015

- Taça Belo Horizonte de Juniores: 1

2010

== Club records ==
- First match: Coritibano-Tiro Pontagrossense 0–1 (October 23, 1909)
- First official match: Coritiba-Ponta Grossa 5–3 (June 12, 1910)
- First goal scorer: Fritz Essenfelter
- Biggest win (National Competitions): Coritiba-Ferroviário 7–1 (Couto Pereira, April 16, 1980), Coritiba-Desportiva-ES 7–1 (Couto Pereira, May 4, 1980) & Coritiba-Palmeiras 6–0 (Couto Pereira, May 5, 2011)
- Heaviest defeat (national competitions): Grêmio-Coritiba 5–0 (Olímpico, February 29, 1984) & Palmeiras-Coritiba 5–0 (Parque Antártica, August 17, 1996)
- Most appearances (any competition): Jairo – 440 (1971–77), (1984–87)
- Record goal scorer: Duílio Dias – 202 (1954–64)
- Consecutive victories):Coritiba has the worldwide record of consecutive victories (24), achieved between February and May 2011.
