= Vitor Tissi =

Brazilian footballer

Personal information
- Full name: Vitor Gonçalves Tissi
- Date of birth: 22 April 2007 (age 19)
- Place of birth: Colombo, Brazil
- Position: Midfielder

Team information
- Current team: Coritiba
- Number: 50

Youth career
- 2016–2026: Coritiba

Senior career*
Years	Team	Apps	(Gls)
2025–	Coritiba	9	(1)
- * Club domestic league appearances and goals as of 12:09, 10 August 2026 (UTC)

Vitor Gonçalves Tissi (born 22 April 2007) is a Brazilian professional footballer who plays as a midfielder for Coritiba.

== Career ==
Born in Colombo, Paraná, Tissi joined Coritiba's youth setup in 2016, for the under-10 team. He made his first team debut on 12 January 2025, starting in a 2–0 Campeonato Paranaense home loss to Londrina, as the squad was mainly composed by under-20 players.

Tissi scored his first senior goal on 22 January 2025, netting Coxa's second in a 2–0 away win over Maringá. Mainly used in the under-20 team during the season, he only returned to feature with the first team in state league matches, before making his Série A debut on 26 July 2026, coming on as a substitute for Vini Paulista in a 0–0 away draw against Red Bull Bragantino.

== Career statistics ==
As of 10 August 2026

Appearances and goals by club, season and competition
Club	Season	League			State League		Cup		Continental		Other		Total	
Club	Season	Division	Apps	Goals	Apps	Goals	Apps	Goals	Apps	Goals	Apps	Goals	Apps	Goals
Coritiba	2025	Série B	0	0	4	1	0	0	—		8 (Note: Appearance(s) in Taça FPF)	0	12	1
Coritiba	2026	Série A	2	0	3	0	0	0	—		—		5	0
Career total			2	0	7	1	0	0	0	0	8	0	17	1
