= Ninho (footballer) =

Brazilian footballer

Personal information
- Full name: Juan Luís Bermudes Nascimento
- Date of birth: 2 March 1903
- Place of birth: São Paulo, Brazil
- Date of death: 20 October 1979 (aged 76)
- Place of death: São Paulo, Brazil
- Positions: Defender; midfielder

Senior career*
Years	Team	Apps	(Gls)
1921–1934	Coritiba		
1938	Coritiba		
- * Club domestic league appearances and goals as of 23 March 2024

Juan Luís Bermudes Nascimento (2 March 1903 – 20 October 1979), better known by the nickname Ninho, was a Brazilian professional footballer who played as a defender and midfielder.

== Career ==
One of the great idols in the history of Coritiba FBC, playing at the club for more than 15 years, Ninho played as a defender and midfielder. He was state champion in 1927 and 1933, and the first player to score a goal in the Atletiba, scoring four times in the first clash between the teams.

== Personal life ==
His elder brother, Maxambomba, was also a historic footballer for Coritiba, and responsible for bringing him to the club.

== Honours ==
Coritiba

- Campeonato Paranaense: 1927, 1933
