= Jairo do Nascimento =

Brazilian footballer (1946–2019)

Jairo
Personal information
- Full name: Jairo do Nascimento
- Date of birth: 23 October 1946
- Place of birth: Joinville, Brazil
- Date of death: 6 February 2019 (aged 72)
- Place of death: Curitiba, Brazil
- Position: Goalkeeper

Senior career*
Years	Team	Apps	(Gls)
1966–1968	Caxias		
1969–1971	Fluminense		
1972–1976	Coritiba	128	(0)
1977–1980	Corinthians	45	(0)
1981–1982	Náutico Capibaribe	23	(0)
1983–1987	Coritiba	24	(0)
1987–1988	América Mineiro		
1988–1989	Atlético Três Corações		
Total		220	(0)

International career
1976	Brazil	1	(0)
- * Club domestic league appearances and goals

Jairo do Nascimento (23 October 1946 – 6 February 2019) was a Brazilian footballer who played as a goalkeeper.

== Career ==
Born in Joinville, Jairo was nicknamed "Pantera Negra" ("the Black Panther").

Jairo played for Caxias, Fluminense, Coritiba, Corinthians, Náutico Capibaribe, América Mineiro and Atlético Três Corações. For Coritiba he made 410 appearances in all competitions, winning the Campeonato Paranaense six times, as well as the Torneio do Povo in 1973 and the Campeonato Brasileiro Série A in 1985. At Corinthians he played in 190 appearances in all competitors and he did not concede a goal for a record 1,132 minutes of play. He also won the Campeonato Paulista in 1977 with the club.

He made one international appearance for Brazil, in 1976.

== Later life and death ==
He died in Curitiba on 6 February 2019, aged 72, from kidney cancer.
