= Reginaldo Nascimento =

Brazilian footballer

Personal information
- Full name: Reginaldo Inácio do Nascimento
- Date of birth: 11 April 1974 (age 52)
- Place of birth: Anápolis, Brazil
- Positions: Defender; defensive midfielder

Youth career
- 1991–1996: Matsubara

Senior career*
Years	Team	Apps	(Gls)
1995–1997	Matsubara		
1996	→ Ferroviária (loan)		
1996	→ América-SP (loan)		
1997–2005	Coritiba	338	(7)
2000	→ Bahia (loan)		
2006	Noroeste		
2006	Atlético Mineiro	12	(0)
2007	Iraty		
2008	CRB		
2009	Iraty		
2010	Juventus-SC		
2011	Rio Branco-PR		
- * Club domestic league appearances and goals as of 19 April 2024

Reginaldo Inácio do Nascimento (born 11 April 1974), better known as Reginaldo Nascimento, is a Brazilian former professional footballer, who played as a defender and defensive midfielder.

== Career ==
Revealed by SE Matsubara, Reginaldo Nascimento arrived at Coritiba in 1997. Even without being an absolute starter, over the years he became an all-rounder in the defensive sector, and made 338 appearances for the club, in addition to winning three state titles. In 2006, he was part of the Atlético Mineiro squad that won the Série B. He currently works at Coritiba as an assistant in the youth categories.

== Honours ==
Coritiba

- Campeonato Paranaense: 1999, 2003, 2004
- Festival Brasileiro de Futebol: 1997

Atlético Mineiro

- Campeonato Brasileiro Série B: 2006
