= Dirceu Krüger =

Brazilian footballer (1945–2019)

Personal information
- Date of birth: 11 April 1945
- Place of birth: Curitiba, Brazil
- Date of death: 25 April 2019 (aged 74)
- Place of death: Curitiba, Brazil
- Position: Midfielder

Youth career
- Combate Barreirinha
- União Ahú

Senior career*
Years	Team	Apps	(Gls)
1963–1966	Britânia		
1966–1975	Coritiba	228	(50)

Managerial career
- 1979: Coritiba
- 1984: Coritiba
- 1985: Coritiba
- 1986: Coritiba
- 1988: Coritiba
- 1996: Coritiba
- 1997: Coritiba
- * Club domestic league appearances and goals

Dirceu Krüger (11 April 1945 — 25 April 2019) was a Brazilian footballer who played midfield. He was associated with Coritiba Foot Ball Club.

== Honours ==
Coritiba Foot Ball Club

- Campeonato Paranaense (7): 1968, 1969, 1971, 1972, 1973, 1974, 1975
- Torneio do Povo: 1973
