= Nilo Neves =

Brazilian footballer

Personal information
- Full name: Nilo Roberto Neves
- Date of birth: 2 December 1942
- Place of birth: Porto Alegre, Brazil
- Date of death: 23 July 2022 (aged 79)
- Place of death: Curitiba, Brazil
- Position: Defender

Youth career
- Internacional

Senior career*
Years	Team	Apps	(Gls)
1957–1963	Internacional		
1963–1968	São José-RS		
1968	Atlético Paranaense		
1968–1975	Coritiba	386	(2)
1976	Blumenau		

Managerial career
- 1989–1992: Sinop
- 1994: União Rondonópolis
- 1995–1996: Internacional (youth)
- 2000–2001: Sinop
- 2006: Barra do Garças
- 2009: Genus
- 2010: Rio Branco-PR
- 2012: Pato Branco
- * Club domestic league appearances and goals as of 19 April 2024

Nilo Neves (2 December 1942 – 23 July 2022), was a Brazilian professional footballer and manager, who played as a defender.

== Playing career ==
Left defender, Nilo was revealed by the youth sectors of SC Internacional. He also played for EC São José, Athletico Paranaense and Coritiba, where he was state champion on seven occasions, and made 386 appearances for the club.

Nilo played once for the Brazil national football team, in an unofficial friendly against Coritiba in 1968.

== Managerial career ==
As a coach, his greatest achievement was the 1990 and 2000 titles with Sinop, being responsible for bringing goalkeeper Rogério Ceni, at the time just 17 years old, into professional football.

== Honours ==
=== Player ===
Internacional

- Campeonato Gaúcho: 1961

Coritiba

- Campeonato Paranaense: 1968, 1969, 1971, 1972, 1973, 1974, 1975
- Torneio do Povo: 1973

=== Manager ===
Sinop

- Campeonato Mato-Grossense: 1990, 2000

== Death ==
Nilo Neves died on 23 July 2022, after an unsuccessful heart surgery.
