= Joel Mendes =

Brazilian footballer (1946–2024)

Personal information
- Date of birth: 25 June 1946
- Place of birth: Curitiba, Paraná, Brazil
- Date of death: 9 December 2024 (aged 78)
- Place of death: Curitiba, Paraná, Brazil
- Height: 1.76 m (5 ft 9 in)
- Position: Goalkeeper

Youth career
- Santa Felicidade-PR

Senior career*
Years	Team	Apps	(Gls)
1967–1969	Coritiba		
1970–1975	Santos		
1972	→ Portuguesa (loan)	17	(0)
1973	→ Coritiba (loan)		
1974	→ Vitória (loan)		
1975–1977	Bahia		
1977–1979	Santa Cruz		
1979–1981	Colorado-PR		
1980	→ Santa Cruz (loan)		
1982	Operário-MS		
1983	Nacional-SP		
1984	Colorado-PR		
1984	Paranavaí		
- * Club domestic league appearances and goals

Joel Mendes (25 June 1946 – 9 December 2024) was a Brazilian professional footballer who played as a goalkeeper.

== Career ==
Revealed by Coritiba in the late 1960s, Joel Mendes stood out for the elasticity and speed of his jumps, which earned him a move to Santos in 1970. He also had a notable spell at Vitória, where he was elected Bola de Prata for his performance in the 1974 Campeonato Brasileiro Série A. In 1975 he had another spell at Santos, but moved to Bahia, where he was state champion in 1975, 1976 and 1977.

After retiring from football in 1984, he became the owner of a bakery in Curitiba.

== Death ==
Mendes died from a stroke in Curitiba, on 9 December 2024, at the age of 78.

== Honours ==
Coritiba

- Campeonato Paranaense: 1968, 1969, 1973
- Torneio do Povo: 1973

Bahia

- Campeonato Baiano: 1975, 1976, 1977

Santa Cruz

- Campeonato Pernambucano: 1978, 1979

Colorado

- Campeonato Paranaense: 1980

Individual

- Bola de Prata: 1974
