= Duílio Dias =

Brazilian footballer (1935–1991)

Duílio
Personal information
- Full name: Duílio Dias
- Date of birth: 2 August 1935
- Place of birth: Ponta Grossa, Brazil
- Date of death: 1991 (aged 55–56)
- Place of death: Curitiba, Brazil
- Position: Forward

Senior career*
Years	Team	Apps	(Gls)
1954–1962	Coritiba		(202)
1963–1964	Água Verde		
- * Club domestic league appearances and goals as of 19 April 2024

Duílio Dias (2 August 1935 – 1991), was a Brazilian professional footballer who played as a forward.

== Career ==
The greatest scorer in the history of Coritiba FBC, Duílio Dias scored 202 for the club, where he played from 1954 to 1962, being state champion on five opportunities and top scorer several times.

== Personal life ==
Dias' son, Duílio Júnior is also a professional footballer.

== Honours ==
Coritiba

- Campeonato Paranaense: 1954, 1956, 1957, 1959, 1960

Individual

- Campeonato Paranaense top scorer: 1955, 1957, 1958, 1960, 1963
