= 1998 Torneio Rio-São Paulo =

Torneio Rio-São Paulo
- Season: 1998
- Champions: Botafogo (4th title)
- Matches played: 30
- Goals scored: 82 (2.73 per match)
- Top goalscorer: Dodô (São Paulo) – 5 goals
- Biggest home win: Palmeiras 4–2 Corinthians (Jan 24)

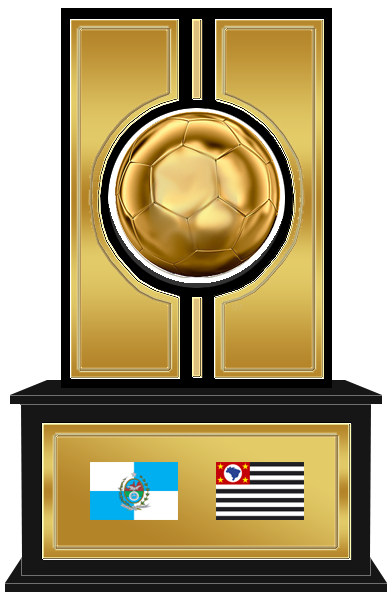
Trophy

The 1998 Torneio Rio São Paulo was the 22nd edition of the Torneio Rio-São Paulo. It was disputed between 21 January to 4 March 1998.

== Participants ==
Team	City	Ground	Nº participations	Best result
Botafogo	(Rio de Janeiro (state)) Rio de Janeiro	Maracanã	19	Champions: 1962, 1964 (shared), 1966 (shared)
Corinthians	(São Paulo (state)) São Paulo	Pacaembu	22	Champions: 1950, 1953, 1954, 1966 (shared)
Flamengo	(Rio de Janeiro (state)) Rio de Janeiro	Maracanã	21	Champions: 1961
Fluminense	(Rio de Janeiro (state)) Rio de Janeiro	Maracanã	21	Champions: 1957, 1960
Palmeiras	(São Paulo (state)) São Paulo	Parque Antártica	22	Champions: 1933, 1951, 1965, 1993
Santos	(São Paulo (state)) Santos	Vila Belmiro	18	Champions: 1959, 1963, 1964 (shared), 1966 (shared), 1997
São Paulo	(São Paulo (state)) São Paulo	Morumbi	21	Runners-up: 1933, 1962
Vasco da Gama	(Rio de Janeiro (state)) Rio de Janeiro	São Januário	22	Champions: 1958, 1966 (shared)

== Format ==
The clubs were separated in two groups: Group A and Group B, playing a double round-robin in each group, with the two best clubs advanced to semifinals. The winners of semifinals, advanced to the finals.

== Tournament ==
Following is the summary of the 1998 Torneio Rio-São Paulo tournament:

=== Group A ===
Pos	Team	Pld	W	D	L	GF	GA	GD	Pts	Qualification
1	(São Paulo (state)) Palmeiras	6	4	1	1	12	8	+4	13	Qualified to semifinals
2	(Rio de Janeiro (state)) Botafogo	6	3	2	1	8	6	+2	11	Qualified to semifinals
3	(Rio de Janeiro (state)) Vasco da Gama	6	2	1	3	6	7	−1	7	
4	(São Paulo (state)) Corinthians	6	1	0	5	5	10	−5	3	

Source: RSSSF
Rules for classification: 1) points; 2) wins; 3) goal difference; 4) goals for.

=== Group B ===
Pos	Team	Pld	W	D	L	GF	GA	GD	Pts	Qualification
1	(São Paulo (state)) Santos	6	3	3	0	12	7	+5	12	Qualified to semifinals
2	(São Paulo (state)) São Paulo	6	1	4	1	8	8	0	7	Qualified to semifinals
3	(Rio de Janeiro (state)) Fluminense	6	1	3	2	9	10	−1	6	
4	(Rio de Janeiro (state)) Flamengo	6	0	4	2	6	10	−4	4	

Source: RSSSF
Rules for classification: 1) points; 2) wins; 3) goal difference; 4) goals for.

=== Semifinals ===
Team 1	Agg.	Team 2	1st leg	2nd leg
Palmeiras	2–2 (2–3 p)	São Paulo	2–1	0–1
Santos	2–2 (3–4 p)	Botafogo	0–0	2–2

=== Finals ===
28 February 1998

São Paulo (São Paulo (state))	2–3	(Rio de Janeiro (state)) Botafogo
Dodô 50'; França 64'		Zé Carlos 38'; Sérgio Manoel 74'; Jorge Luiz 86'

Morumbi, São Paulo
Attendance: 38,560
Referee: Reinaldo Ribas

4 March 1998

Botafogo (Rio de Janeiro (state))	2–2	(São Paulo (state)) São Paulo
Jefferson 11'; Zé Carlos 76'		Adriano 37'; Dodô 43'

Maracanã, Rio de Janeiro
Attendance: 56,334
Referee: Oscar Roberto Godói

== Top scorers ==
Rank	Player	Club	Goals
1	Dodô	São Paulo	5
2	Bebeto	Botafogo	4
2	Jorginho	Santos	4
2	Rôni	Fluminense	4
2	Zé Carlos	Botafogo	4
