= Maxambomba =

Brazilian footballer

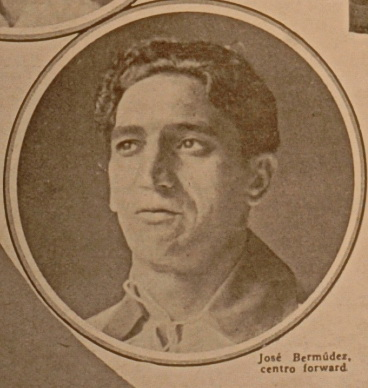
- José Francisco Bermúdes, October 1921

Personal information
- Full name: José Francisco Bermudes Nascimento
- Date of birth: 21 December 1897
- Place of birth: São Paulo, Brazil
- Date of death: 2 September 1963 (aged 65)
- Place of death: Bauru, Brazil
- Position: Midfielder

Senior career*
Years	Team	Apps	(Gls)
1915–1920	Coritiba		
1920	América-PE		
1921	Coritiba		
1926–1929	Portuguesa	14	(14)
- * Club domestic league appearances and goals as of 23 March 2024

José Francisco Bermudes Nascimento (21 December 1897 – 2 September 1963), better known by the nickname Maxambomba, was a Brazilian professional footballer who played as a midfielder.

== Career ==
Right midfielder, Maxambomba was top scorer and great highlight of Coritiba FBC state champion in 1916. He received his nickname in allusion to a word derived from "machine pump", due to Bermudes being like the team's bomb. He was also the highlight of the Paraná state team. Played his last years for Portuguesa from 1926 to 1929, making 14 appearances and scoring 14 goals.

== International career ==
Maxambomba was called up for the 1921 South American Championship held in Argentina.

== Personal life ==
His younger brother, Ninho, was also a footballer and played together with him in Coritiba.

== Death ==
Maxambomba died hospitalized in Bauru, on 2 September 1963.

== Honours ==
Coritiba

- Campeonato Paranaense: 1916

Individual

- 1916 Campeonato Paranaense top scorer: 16 goals
