= Fritz Essenfelder =

Argentine footballer

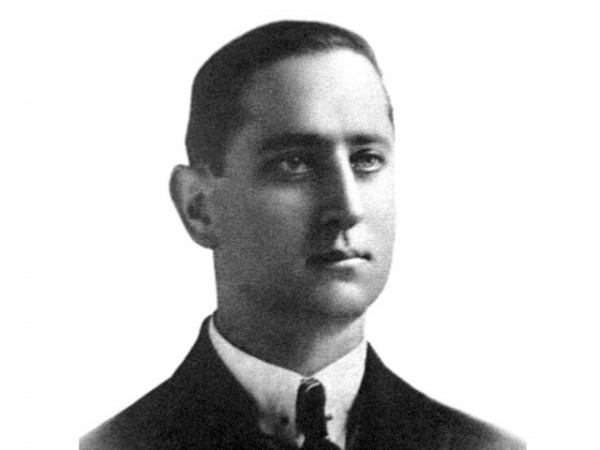
- Born: Frederico Fernando Essenfelder; 23 June 1891; Buenos Aires, Argentina
- Died: 27 February 1952 (aged 60); Curitiba, Brazil
- Occupation: Football player
- Years active: 1909–17
- Known for: Founder of Coritiba

Frederico Fernando Essenfelder (23 June 1891 – 27 February 1952), also known as Fritz Essenfelder, was an Argentine football player who settled in Brazil. He was one of the founders of Coritiba Foot Ball Club in 1909. He played for the team from 1909 to 1917.

== Early life ==
Essenfelder was born in Buenos Aires, Argentina, of German origin. His family migrated to Curitiba in 1909 where he joined a team called Clube Ginástico Teuto-Brasileiro.

The football team Fritz created was called the 'Coritiba Foot Ball Club'. Fritz was chosen to be the captain because of his leadership skills.

Essenfelder was the champion of Paraná state, winning Coritiba's first title in 1916.

Fritz made in Paraná what Charles Miller made in Brasil: when he kicked the ball, he brought passion to the game.

— Luiz Geraldo Mazza
