= Athletiba =

One of the most traditional derbies in Brazilian football

Atletiba
- Athletico Paranaense Coritiba
- Other names: Athletiba, Atle-Tiba
- Location: Curitiba, Paraná, Brazil
- First meeting: June 8, 1924; Campeonato Paranaense; Coritiba 6–3 Athletico
- Latest meeting: September 11, 2026; Brazil Série A Coritiba 3–3 Athletico
- Stadiums: Arena da Baixada (Athletico); Couto Pereira (Coritiba)

Statistics
- Total meetings: 365
- Most wins: Coritiba (140 wins)
- Top scorer: Neno (21)
- All-time series: Athletico: 116; Coritiba: 140; Drawn: 109
- Largest victory: Coritiba 6–0 Atlético; November 14, 1959

The Athletiba or Atletiba is the Brazilian football derby between the clubs Athletico Paranaense and Coritiba FC, both from Curitiba, Paraná. These clubs were founded in 1924 and 1909, respectively, and have been each other's biggest rival for many decades. On many occasions the Campeonato Paranaense, the state league of the state of Paraná, was decided by this derby.

The Athletiba is the only local derby in Brazilian football between two national champion clubs outside the Big Twelve, and also the one with most encounters in the Campeonato Brasileiro Série A outside such group, with 46 games until the end of the 2026 edition.

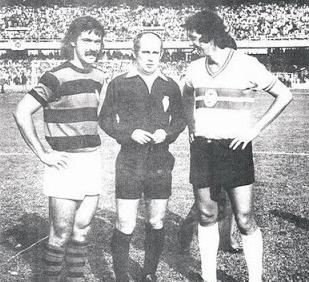
Athletico's Sicupira (left) and Coritiba's "Capitão Hidalgo" (right) before an Atletiba in 1972.

== History ==
=== Background ===
The Brazilian city of Curitiba, capital of the state Paraná in the south of Brazil, has always been divided in two halves when it comes to football. The traditional families that had lived in Curitiba for generations rooted for América and Internacional, whereas the new immigrants (mainly the Germans) were represented by Coritiba. It stayed like that, until the traditional families were united when América and Internacional merged to become "Atlético Paranaense" in 1924.

=== Matches ===
The first official game between Coxa and Furacão took place on June 8, 1924. On the field of Coritiba, Parque Graciosa, the new immigrants won 6–3. It took until December 25, 1927, for Athletico to win its first Atletiba, when Coritiba was beaten 2–1 at Água Verde. After that, it was Coritiba's turn to wait 3 years for a victory in the derby. In 1930 Coritiba broke the spell and won 7–3.

The largest victory of Athletico against Coritiba was a 6–2 win on April 6, 1938, at the Estádio Joaquim Américo. Coritiba's largest win is not the aforementioned 7–3, but a 6–0 victory on November 14, 1959. The highest scoring games are a 7–4 victory for Coritiba and a 6–5 Athletico victory.

In the Campeonato Paranaense, the state competition, Coritiba holds the record with 39 titles, followed by Athletico, with 28 titles. They have played against each other in the final of the tournament nineteen times, with Athletico having a slight advantage, winning 10 times, while Coritiba won 9.

== Statistics ==
=== Head to head statistics ===
Competition	Games	Wins		Draws
Competition	Games	CAP	CFC	Draws
**Campeonato Paranaense** (Note: Includes the 2002 Supercampeonato Paranaense.)	276	83	108	85
Copa Sul	2	2	0	0
Copa Sul-Minas	1	1	0	0
**Campeonato Brasileiro Série A**	46	17	16	13
**Campeonato Brasileiro Série B**	6	1	3	3
Seletiva Nacional da Libertadores	2	1	1	0
Other (Note: Includes the Taça FPF, in which both sides participate with their reserve teams.)	32	11	13	8
Total official	365	116	140	109
Friendly matches	36	11	12	13
Total	401	127	152	122

As of September 11, 2026. Bold denotes competitions that are still active.

=== Topscorers ===
Topscorers
Name		G
CFC	Neno	21
CFC	Baby	14
CAP	Jackson	14
CAP	Marreco	13
CFC	Staco	13
CFC	Pizzatinho	13
CAP	Guará	13
CFC	Duílio	13
G - Goals; CFC - Coritiba; CAP - Athletico Paranaense

=== Statistics in the Campeonato Brasileiro Série A ===
- 46 matches
- 17 Athletico wins
- 13 draws
- 16 Coritiba wins
- 47 Athletico goals
- 46 Coritiba goals

Last match: September 11, 2026: Coritiba 3–3 Athletico

== Honours ==
Competition	Athletico Paranaense		Coritiba	
Competition	Titles	Years	Titles	Years
Brazilian Championship	1	2001	1	1985
Brazil Cup	1	2019	0	
Copa Sudamericana	2	2018, 2021	0	
Suruga Bank Cup	1	2019	0	
Total	5		1	
Paraná State Championship	28	1925, 1929, 1930, 1934, 1936, 1940, 1943, 1945, 1949, 1958, 1970, 1982, 1983, 1985, 1988, 1990, 1998, 2000, 2001, 2002 (Note: In 2002, the four clubs playing in the Copa Sul-Minas (Athletico Paranaense, Coritiba, Paraná Clube and Malutrom) did not participate in the 2002 Campeonato Paranaense, won by Iraty. The "Supercampeonato Paranaense", won by Athletico, was contested later and included these four teams, along with the top four clubs from the regular championship.), 2005, 2009, 2016, 2018, 2019, 2020, 2023, 2024	39	1916, 1927, 1931, 1933, 1935, 1939, 1941, 1942, 1946, 1947, 1951, 1952, 1954, 1956, 1957, 1959, 1960, 1968, 1969, 1971, 1972, 1973, 1974, 1975, 1976, 1978, 1979, 1986, 1989, 1999, 2003, 2004, 2008, 2010, 2011, 2012, 2013, 2017, 2022
Seletiva para Libertadores	1	1999	0	
Torneio do Povo	0		1	1973 (Note: The 1973 Torneio do Povo was the only edition of the tournament in which the CBD took part in the organization.)
Brazilian Championship Série B	1	1995	3	2007, 2010, 2025
Total general	35		44	

== See also ==
- Brazilian Football State Championship
- Campeonato Paranaense
