= Colombo, Paraná =

Coordinates: 25°17′31″S 49°13′26″W

Colombo
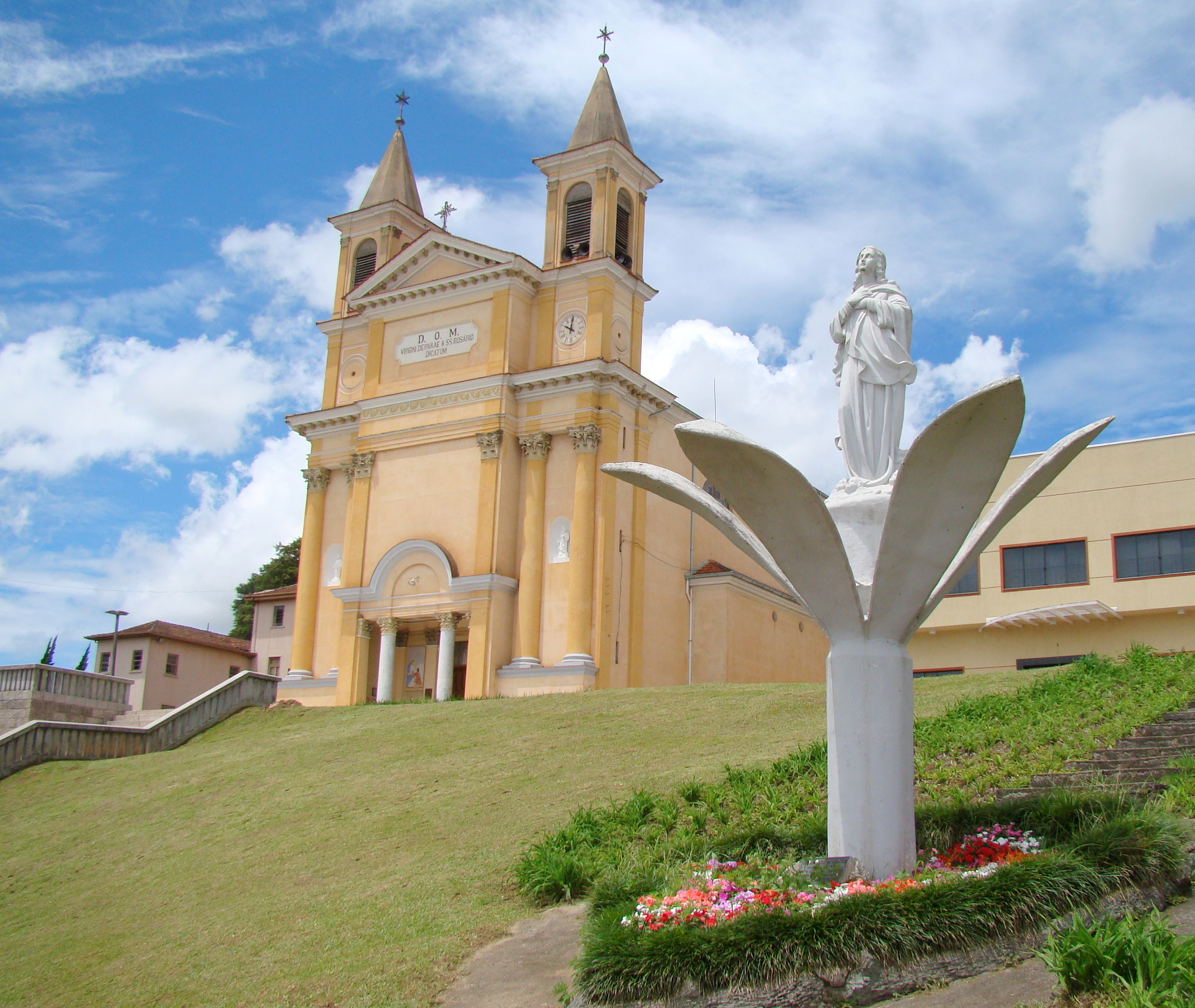
- Church Hall, whose construction began in 1898.

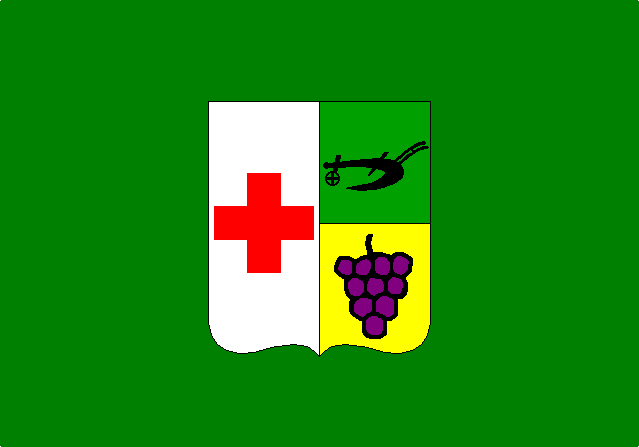
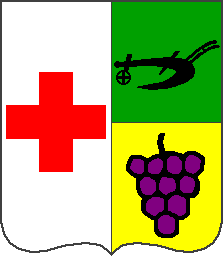
- Flag Coat of arms

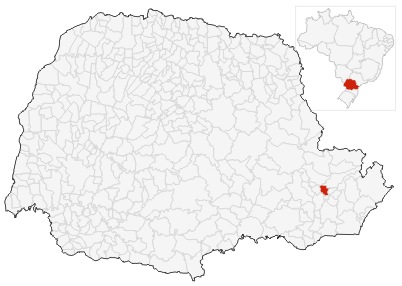
- Location of Colombo
- Coordinates: 23°47' S 46°58' W
- Country: Brazil
- State: Paraná

Government
  - Mayor: Helder Luiz Lazarotto

Area
  - Total: 198.7 km^{2} (76.7 sq mi)
- Elevation: 950 m (3,120 ft)

Population (2022 Brazilian census)
  - Total: 232,212
  - Estimate (2025): 241,672
  - Density: 1,169/km^{2} (3,027/sq mi)
- Time zone: UTC−3 (BRT)

Colombo is a city of about 240,000 inhabitants in the Southern Brazilian state of Paraná; is the third largest city in Greater Curitiba, with the largest one being Curitiba.

It was founded on 5 February 1890. It is located at 25º17'30" S, 49º13'27" W, at an elevation of about 1000 metres above sea level, some 18 km from state capital Curitiba. The city is the largest Italian colony in the state.

== Climate ==
Climate data for Colombo (1991-2021)
Month	Jan	Feb	Mar	Apr	May	Jun	Jul	Aug	Sep	Oct	Nov	Dec	Year
Mean daily maximum °C (°F)	24.6 (76.3)	24.8 (76.6)	23.9 (75.0)	22.3 (72.1)	19 (66)	18.3 (64.9)	18.1 (64.6)	19.7 (67.5)	20.9 (69.6)	22.2 (72.0)	22.6 (72.7)	24.2 (75.6)	21.7 (71.1)
Daily mean °C (°F)	20.5 (68.9)	20.6 (69.1)	19.9 (67.8)	18.2 (64.8)	15.1 (59.2)	14 (57)	13.5 (56.3)	14.6 (58.3)	15.9 (60.6)	17.5 (63.5)	18.2 (64.8)	19.8 (67.6)	17.3 (63.2)
Mean daily minimum °C (°F)	17.7 (63.9)	17.9 (64.2)	17.2 (63.0)	15.3 (59.5)	12.1 (53.8)	10.8 (51.4)	10.1 (50.2)	10.7 (51.3)	12.4 (54.3)	14.1 (57.4)	15.7 (60.3)	16.7 (62.1)	14.2 (57.6)
Average precipitation mm (inches)	245 (9.6)	197 (7.8)	135 (5.3)	79 (3.1)	93 (3.7)	95 (3.7)	95 (3.7)	74 (2.9)	132 (5.2)	130 (5.1)	131 (5.2)	168 (6.6)	1,574 (61.9)
Average rainy days	17	15	14	8	7	6	6	5	8	11	11	11	119
Average relative humidity (%)	86	86	85	83	83	84	82	80	81	83	83	84	83
Mean monthly sunshine hours	189.1	180.8	176.7	165	158.1	174	189.1	210.8	180	170.5	168	195.3	2,157.4
Mean daily sunshine hours	6.1	6.4	5.7	5.5	5.1	5.8	6.1	6.8	6.0	5.5	5.6	6.3	5.9
Source: Climate data (sun 1999-2019)
