= Vini Paulista =

Brazilian footballer

Personal information
- Full name: Vinicius Romualdo dos Santos
- Date of birth: 22 March 2001 (age 25)
- Place of birth: Santa Bárbara d'Oeste, Brazil
- Height: 1.80 m (5 ft 11 in)
- Position: Winger

Team information
- Current team: Coritiba
- Number: 36

Youth career
- 2012–2022: Grêmio

Senior career*
Years	Team	Apps	(Gls)
2021–2022	Grêmio	9	(0)
2023	Juventude	31	(1)
2024–	Coritiba	87	(3)
- * Club domestic league appearances and goals as of 7 April 2026

Vinicius Romualdo dos Santos (born 22 March 2001), commonly known as Vini Paulista, is a Brazilian professional footballer who plays as a winger for Campeonato Brasileiro Série A club Coritiba.

== Club career ==
=== Grêmio ===
Born in Santa Bárbara d'Oeste, Vini Paulista joined the Grêmio's Academy at the age of 11 in 2012.

=== Coritiba ===
On 12/19/2023, Vini Paulista signs a contract with Coritiba and, in May 2025, the player and club sign a contract extension until the end of 2027.

== Career statistics ==
=== Club ===
As of 28 May 2021.

Appearances and goals by club, season and competition
Club	Season	League			State League		National Cup		Continental		Other		Total	
Club	Season	Division	Apps	Goals	Apps	Goals	Apps	Goals	Apps	Goals	Apps	Goals	Apps	Goals
Grêmio	2021	Série A	0	0	0	0	0	0	1 (Note: Appearance(s) in Copa Libertadores.)	0	—		1	0
Career total			0	0	0	0	0	0	1	0	0	0	1	0

== Honours ==
Grêmio

- Campeonato Gaúcho: 2021, 2022
- Recopa Gaúcha: 2021
