= Jorge Luiz (footballer, born 1965) =

Brazilian footballer

Personal information
- Full name: Jorge Luiz Matheus de Almeida
- Date of birth: 12 August 1965 (age 61)
- Place of birth: Niterói, Brazil
- Height: 1.77 m (5 ft 10 in)
- Position: Centre-back

Youth career
- 1982–1985: Fluminense

Senior career*
Years	Team	Apps	(Gls)
1985–1987	Fluminense		
1987–1989	Tupi		
1989	Corinthians	19	(1)
1990	Portuguesa		
1990–1995	Vasco da Gama		
1994–1995	→ Guarani (loan)		
1995–1996	Flamengo	87	(12)
1995	→ Atlético Mineiro (loan)	16	(2)
1996	Atlético Paranaense		
1997–1998	Botafogo		
1998	Bahia		
1998	Palmeiras	3	(0)
1999	Grêmio		
1999–2000	Botafogo		
2001	Avaí		
2001–2003	America-RJ		

Managerial career
- 2014: Vasco da Gama (caretaker)
- 2018: Rio Verde-GO
- * Club domestic league appearances and goals as of 14 October 2023

Jorge Luiz Matheus de Almeida (born 12 August 1965), simply known as Jorge Luiz, is a Brazilian former professional footballer and manager who played as a centre-back.

== Career ==
He started his career at Fluminense, but didn't receive any chances to play for the club. He was taken to Tupi de Juiz de Fora, and after that, he played for Corinthians and Portuguesa in São Paulo. He returned to Rio de Janeiro at Vasco da Gama, the club for which he won most of the titles he played between 1992 and 1994. In 1994 he was loaned to Guarani, but maintained his high level, joining the Bola de Prata team of the Brazilian Championship that year.

He also accumulated successful spells at Flamengo, Botafogo, Bahia, Palmeiras and Grêmio, being champion in all of these clubs.

== Managerial career ==
Jorge Luiz took over Vasco on an interim basis after the dismissal of Adílson Batista. In 2018, he coached EC Rio Verde in the Campeonato Goiano.

== Honours ==
Vasco da Gama

- Campeonato Carioca: 1992, 1993, 1994
- Taça Guanabara: 1992, 1993
- Taça Rio: 1992, 1994
- Trofeo Ciudad de Zaragoza: 1993
- Ciutat de Barcelona Trophy: 1993

Flamengo

- Campeonato Carioca: 1996
- Taça Guanabara: 1995, 1996
- Taça Rio: 1996
- Copa de Oro: 1996

Botafogo

- Campeonato Carioca: 1997
- Taça Guanabara: 1997
- Taça Rio: 1997
- Torneio Rio-São Paulo: 1998

Bahia

- Campeonato Baiano: 1998

Palmeiras

- Copa Mercosur: 1998

Grêmio

- Campeonato Gaúcho: 1999
- Copa Sul: 1999

Individual

- 1994 Bola de Prata (playing for Guarani)
