= Festival Brasileiro de Futebol =

1997 Festival Brasileiro de Futebol
Tournament details
- Country: Brazil
- Dates: 20 Nov – 6 Dec
- Teams: 8

Final positions
- Champions: (Paraná (state)) Coritiba
- Runners-up: (Rio de Janeiro (state)) Botafogo

Tournament statistics
- Matches played: 13
- Goals scored: 43 (3.31 per match)
- Top goal scorer(s): Marquinhos (Coritiba); 5 goals

The Festival Brasileiro de Futebol was a friendly football competition organized in the year of 1997, bringing together teams that did not qualify for the final phase of the Brazilian Championship that year. The tournament organized by the Brazilian television network Sistema Brasileiro de Televisão (SBT).

== Participants ==
Club	City
Botafogo	Rio de Janeiro
Corinthians	São Paulo
Coritiba	Curitiba
Operário	Campo Grande
Paraná	Curitiba
Rio de Janeiro	Rio de Janeiro
São Paulo	São Paulo
Vitória	Salvador

== Format ==
The championship was disputed with two groups in a single round-robin format. The two group winners qualified for the final match. All matches in the first stage were played in the Morenão stadium.

=== First stage ===
Group A

Pos	Team	Pld	W	D	L	GF	GA	GD	Pts	Qualification or relegation
1	(Paraná (state)) Coritiba	3	3	0	0	9	2	+7	9	Advanced to Final
2	(Bahia) Vitória	3	2	0	1	7	6	+1	6	
3	(São Paulo (state)) São Paulo	3	1	0	2	5	4	+1	3	
4	(Rio de Janeiro (state)) Rio de Janeiro	3	0	0	3	0	9	−9	0	

Updated to match(es) played on April 23, 2023. Source: RSSSF Brasil and Campeões do Futebol
Rules for classification: 1) points; 2) wins; 3) goal difference; 4) head-to-head points.

Group B

Pos	Team	Pld	W	D	L	GF	GA	GD	Pts	Qualification or relegation
1	(Rio de Janeiro (state)) Botafogo	3	2	1	0	8	2	+6	7	Advanced to Final
2	(Paraná (state)) Paraná	3	1	2	0	5	2	+3	5	
3	(São Paulo (state)) Corinthians	3	1	1	1	2	4	−2	4	
4	(Mato Grosso do Sul) Operário	3	0	0	3	1	8	−7	0	

Updated to match(es) played on April 23, 2023. Source: RSSSF Brasil and Campeões do Futebol
Rules for classification: 1) points; 2) wins; 3) goal difference; 4) head-to-head points.

=== Final match ===
Coritiba was entitled to hold the final at home due to the better campaign. The attendance revenue were split between the clubs.

6 December

Coritiba (Paraná (state))	3–3	(Rio de Janeiro (state)) Botafogo
Marquinhos 10'; Rogério Barbosa 22'; Basílio 84'		Jorge Luiz 28', 88'; Sinval 77'
Penalties
Cléber (penalty scored); Paulo Foiani (penalty scored); Reginaldo Araújo (penalty scored); Basílio (penalty scored); Rogério Barbosa (penalty scored); Flávio (penalty scored); Rogério Prateat (penalty missed); Tiganá (penalty scored)	7–6	(penalty scored) Djair; (penalty scored) Jefferson; (penalty scored) Ricardo França; (penalty scored) Pingo; (penalty scored) Jorge Luiz; (penalty scored) Marco Aurélio; (penalty missed) Dimba; (penalty missed) Robson

Estádio Couto Pereira, Curitiba
Referee: Getúlio Barbosa de Sousa
