= Coritiba Foot Ball Club =

Brazilian football club

Coritiba
- Full name: Coritiba Foot Ball Club
- Nicknames: Coxa (Thigh); Glorioso (Glorious)
- Founded: October 12, 1909; 117 years ago
- Stadium: Couto Pereira
- Capacity: 40,502
- SAF Owner: Treecorp (90%); Coritiba Foot Ball Club (10%)
- President: Glenn Stenger
- Head coach: Vacant
- League: Campeonato Brasileiro Série A Campeonato Paranaense
- 2025 2025: Série B, 1st of 20 (champions); Paranaense, 5th of 12
- Website: coritiba.com.br
Home colours	Away colours	Third colours

Coritiba Foot Ball Club is a Brazilian football club based in Curitiba, Paraná. Competes in the Campeonato Paranaense, the Paraná premier state league, and in the Campeonato Brasileiro Série A, the top division of Brazilian football. It plays it home matches in Estádio Couto Pereira, built in 1932, with the capacity of 40,000 spectators.

Founded in 1909 by German immigrants, it is the oldest football club and the club with the most titles in the state. The club has won a record of 39 state league titles. Coritiba was the first club from Paraná to win the Campeonato Brasileiro Série A in 1985, breaking the hegemony of teams from São Paulo, Rio de Janeiro, Rio Grande do Sul and Minas Gerais that had lasted since the 1960s. It has also won three Campeonato Brasileiro Série B titles, in 2007, 2010 and 2025. Coritiba was the first southern club to have competed in both main continental competitions, the Copa Libertadores and the Copa Sudamericana.

The club still holds the record for the most consecutive victories, 24 (twenty-four), in official competitions, and the longest streak among Brazilian teams, having played more than 4,800 games in its history. Its main rivalry is with Athletico Paranaense, with whom it plays the Atletiba derby, one of the great rivalries in Brazilian football.

In June 2023, Treecorp Investimentos completed the purchase of 90% of the club's SAF, in a deal valued at 1.1 billion reais.

== History ==
=== Foundation ===
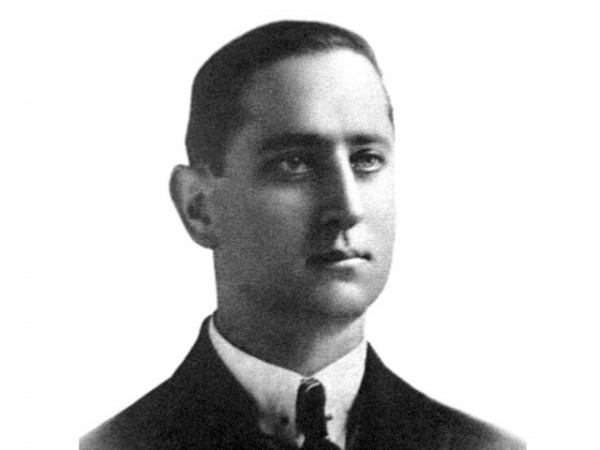
Fritz Essenfelder

In 1909, a group of young men met in the Clube Ginástico Teuto-Brasileiro Turnverein (German-Brazilian Gymnastics Club Turnverein – "Turnverein" being the German word for gymnastics club), where the German immigrant community of Curitiba gathered to play a variety of sports. In July of that year, a prominent member of the club, Frederico "Fritz" Essenfelder arrived with a leather ball in hand. He explained to his friends that it was a football and he explained the rules of this new game. Fritz and his friends within the club started organizing matches in the field of the Quartel da Força Pública (Public Force Headquarters).

Later, an invitation came to play a match against a club of workers, many of them British, from the Ponta Grossa railway. On 12 October 1909, Fritz called a meeting in the old Theatro Hauer (Hauer Theatre) to arrange the first match. A decision was made to form a football club, and he would call it Teuto-Brasileiro. Teuto-Brasileiro would be the first football club in the state of Paraná.

=== The First Match ===
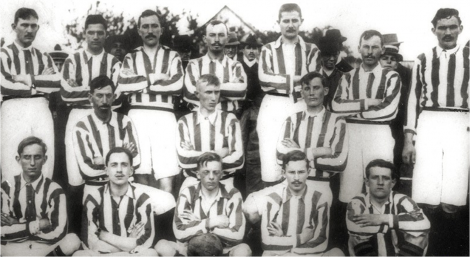
First match

On 23 October 1909, in Ponta Grossa, the club had its first official match. The opponents were Clube de Foot Ball de Tiro Pontagrossense, made up of employees from the South American Brazilian Engineering Company. The match was won by Tiro Pontagrossense, with a 1–0 scoreline, the goal being scored by Elias Mota.

Coritiba's team for the first match was: Arthur Iwersen, Erothildes Carlberg, Leopoldo Obladen, Arthur Hauer, Alfredo Labsch, Alfredo Hauer, Walter Dietrich, Teodoro Obladen, Carlos Schleker, Roberto Juchks, Fritz Essenfelder, Johann Maschke, Waldemar Hauer, Alvin Hauer and Rudolf Kaastrup.

=== Club Foundation ===
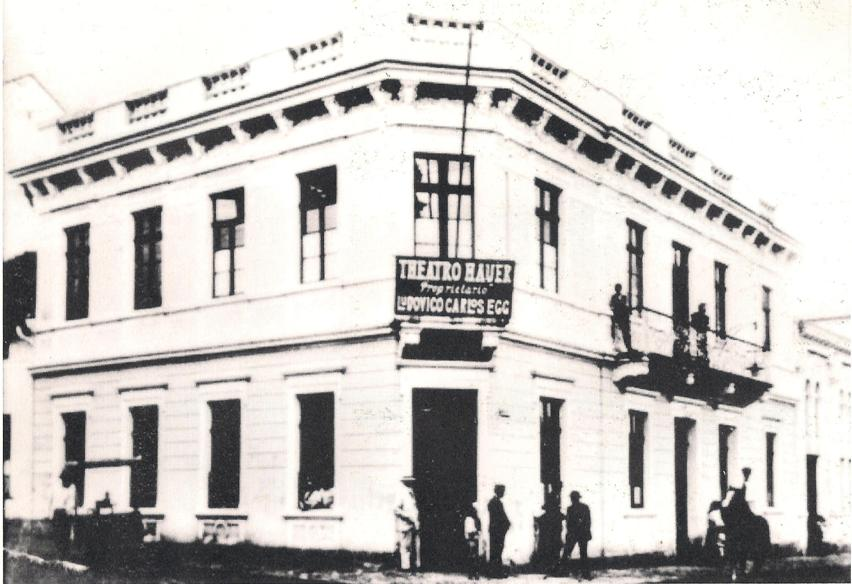
Theatro Hauer

After the match in Ponta Grossa, the club's founders and members were excited by the new game, and decided to dedicate their club exclusively to football. There were already more than 50 players, many of them not of German descent, yet the Clube Ginástico Teuto-Brasileiro Turnverein did not allow non-German members; this led to the formation of a separate club (after many discussions held at Teatro Hauer throughout December 1909). Finally, on 30 January 1910, the independent Coritibano Foot Ball Club was formed. The name was chosen as this is what the team had played as at their first match in Ponta Grossa.

The first club meeting was held 21 April 1910, after they had acquired all of the rules of the sport (from Rio de Janeiro and São Paulo). During this meeting, the first Board of Directors was formed, naming João Viana Seiler as president, Arthur Hauer as vice-president, José Júlio Franco and Leopoldo Obladen as first and second secretary respectively, and Walter Dietrich and Alvim Hauer as first and second treasurer respectively. Fritz was named captain of the team. It was also during this meeting that the name of the club was changed, this time to Coritiba, after the old name of the capital of Paraná. This was to avoid confusion with a social club in the city called Coritibano. The foundation of Coritiba Foot Ball Club effectively launched organized football in the state of Paraná.

=== 1910s and 1920s ===
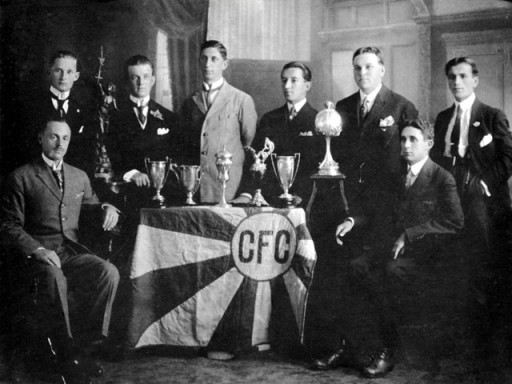
João Viana Seiler, first president

The search for a football ground began and the Hipódromo do Guabirotuba (Guabirotuba Horse Racing Track) was chosen. It was also the home of the Jockey Clube do Paraná until 1955. Bleachers were needed to accommodate spectators, and after the new stadium was retrofitted for football, it was named Prado de Guabirotuba. The inauguration took place on 12 June 1910, before a match against Ponta Grossa Foot Ball Club (the new name of Clube de Foot Ball de Tiro Pontagrossense). Coritiba won the match 5–3. It was the first football match in Curitiba and was viewed by 200 spectators. Coritiba went on to play at Prado de Guabirotuba until 1917.

In 1915, Coritiba started competing in both the Campeonato da Cidade (City Championship) and the Campeonato Paranaense state championship. Coritiba won both the city and the state championships the following year. On 2 July 1916, Coritiba defeated a club by the name of Spartano in the Campeonato Paranaense state championship by 7 goals to the opponent's nought. That year, star player José Bermudes – better known as Maxambomba – became the first player from a Paraná team to be selected for the Brazil national squad. Coritiba won the Torneio Afonso Camargo (Afonso Camargo Tournament) and, in 1917, the club started playing at their new stadium Parque da Graciosa in Juvevê, where they played until 1932.

In 1920, Coritiba won the Torneio Início and, in 1921, they won it again along with the Torneio da Cruz Vermelha and the Torneio de Tiradentes. On 15 August 1921, the club beat the São Paulo state team, the Seleção Paulista, 1–0. The São Paulo state team formed the backbone of the Brazil national side, so this victory put football in the State of Paraná on the national map. The forward Maxambomba and the midfielder Gonçalo Pena were both selected for the Brazil national team that played in the 1921 South American Championship (now called the Copa América).

In 1924, the great state rivalry between Coritiba and Clube Atlético Paranaense began. On 8 June of that year, Coritiba beat Atlético 6–3, with four goals by Ninho. On 7 November 1926, Coritiba beat Paraná Sports 13–1, the largest goal difference in the history of the Paraná state championship. Staco scored five goals for Coritiba. In 1927, with Antônio Couto Pereira as president, Coritiba soundly won the Campeonato Paranaense by winning eight of their nine matches. Staco scored seven goals in a 9–0 victory over Savoia. In the same year, the club won both the Campeonato da Cidade and the Taça Fox.

    1. Hino eugenista de 1928

Em 1928, o Coritiba Foot Ball Club utilizava um hino cuja letra apresentava conteúdo associado ao pensamento eugenista e racista vigente no Brasil naquele período.

A composição trazia o verso:

> “Afirmação de nossa raça / Pela vitória da eugenia”

A referência à **eugenia**, movimento que defendia o suposto “aperfeiçoamento” da população por meio da seleção de características humanas e que esteve historicamente associado a ideias de hierarquia racial, tornou o hino um dos episódios controversos da história do clube.

Apesar de não fazer parte do hino oficial atualmente utilizado pelo clube, a composição de 1928 permanece como registro histórico de uma época em que ideias eugenistas e racistas circulavam no futebol e na sociedade brasileira.

=== 1930s and 1940s ===
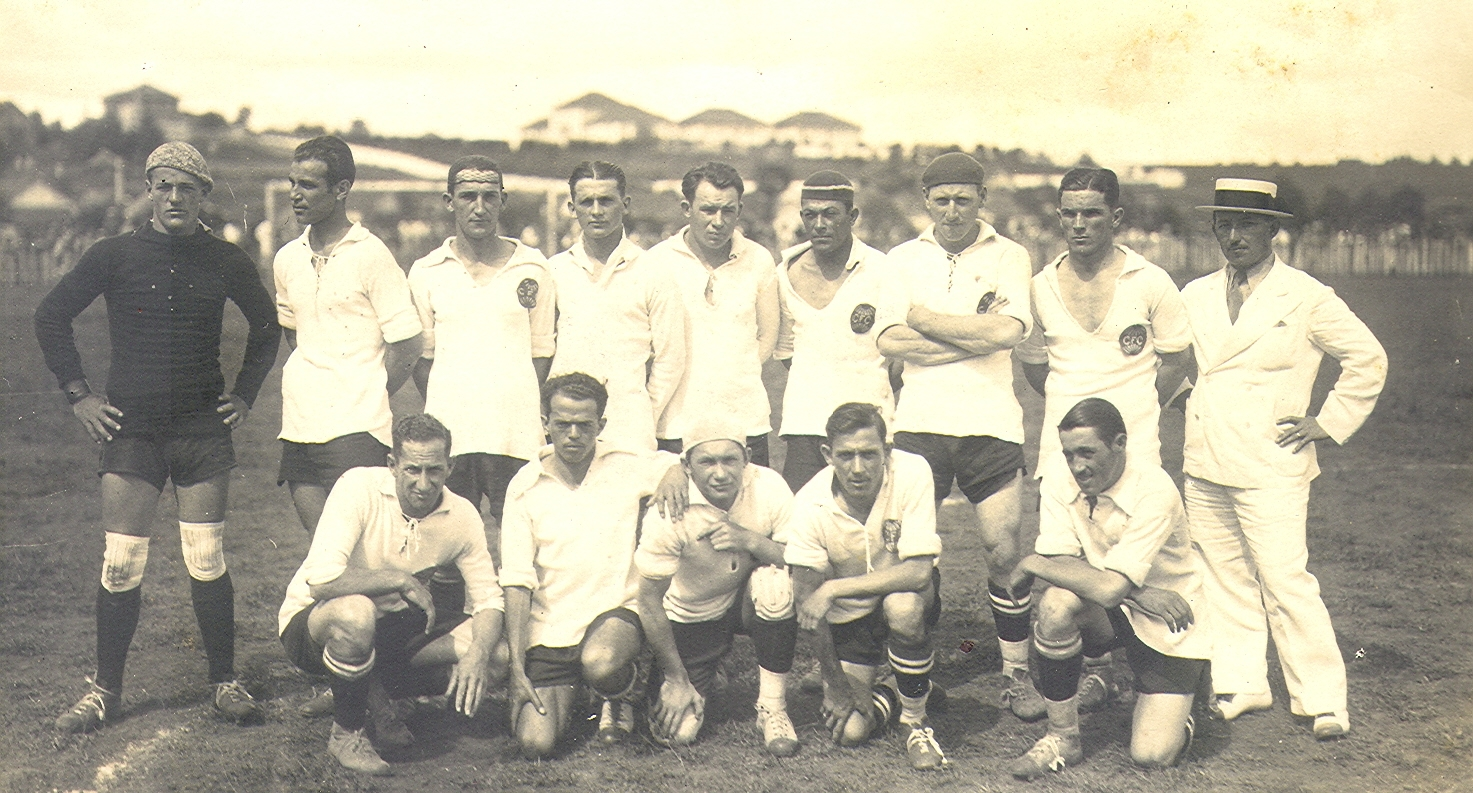
Coritiba 1931

In 1930, Coritiba won the Torneio Início. On 23 November, Coritiba beat their arch-rivals Atlético-PR by 7–4, the highest scoring match in the competition. The following year, Coritiba won the Campeonato Paranaense and the Campeonato da Cidade. In the 1931 edition of the Campeonato Paranaense, history was made during a match against Palestra Itália.

Moaçir Gonçalves was a player-manager for Coritiba and he became the first black player for a team from the state capital. There were many black players in the 1930s in Brazil, but Curitiba was a city dominated demographically by German, Polish and Ukrainian immigrants so black players were rare. With his team trailing 3–1, Moaçir Gonçalves substituted himself in and Coritiba won 5–4.

Another notable character that season was Rei, a young ball boy for Coritiba nicknamed Rei dos Vagabundos (King of Bums) due to his lazy, laid-back attitude. During training for a Sunday match, the regular goalkeeper was late and the coach, Pizzatto, put the sixteen-year-old Fontana in the net. He astonished everyone with his performance and he was promptly registered as a player by the next match. He debuted against Atlético-PR in Baixada, and Coritiba won 1–0. José Fontana was selected as Man of the Match and went on to be known as 'The King'. He became the first goalkeeper from Paraná state to be selected for the national side.

In 1932, Coritiba won both the Torneio Inicio and the Torneio dos Cronista Esportivos. On 7 August 1932, Coritiba beat Atlético-PR 6–1, away from home and with a reserve team. On 19 November, Coritiba inaugurated its new Belfort Duarte stadium. The inaugural match was against América-RJ, a team from Rio who were the defending champions of the Campeonato Carioca, which is the state championship in Rio de Janeiro. Coritiba won 4–2 and began a long period of success, winning many titles including the city's championship, Campeonato da Cidade (1933, 1935 and 1939), the Campeonato Paranaense (1933, 1935 and 1939), the Torneio Arthur Friedenreich (1934) and Torneio Início (1939).

On 23 January 1941, Coritiba played its first match against a foreign team, drawing with Gimnasia y Esgrima La Plata of Argentina at Belfort Duarte. On 1 February 1942, Neno scored seven goals in a 10–2 victory over Jacarezinho. On 18 March, the club played a friendly against Avaí and won 4–1, the first match played at night under floodlights in the state of Paraná. In 1943, Coritiba won both the Torneio Imprensa and the Torneio Luis Aranha. 1944 saw Coritiba win the Torneio Getúlio Vargas and, in the following year, the Torneio da Cidade de Curitiba. During this time Couto Pereira left the presidency of the club after two terms (a total of thirteen years). In 1946 and 1947, won the Campeonato da Cidade and were twice champions in the Campeonato Paranaense. Also in 1947, Coritiba won all four categories of the Campeonato Paranaense (aspirant, amateur, juvenile and professional) and was dubbed Campeoníssimo or 'Super Champion'. On 12 July 1949, Coritiba played its first match against a club from outside of continental America. They beat Rapid Vienna of Austria 4–0 in Vila Capanema. Rapid Vienna was the Austrian national champion at the time.

=== 1950s and 1960s ===
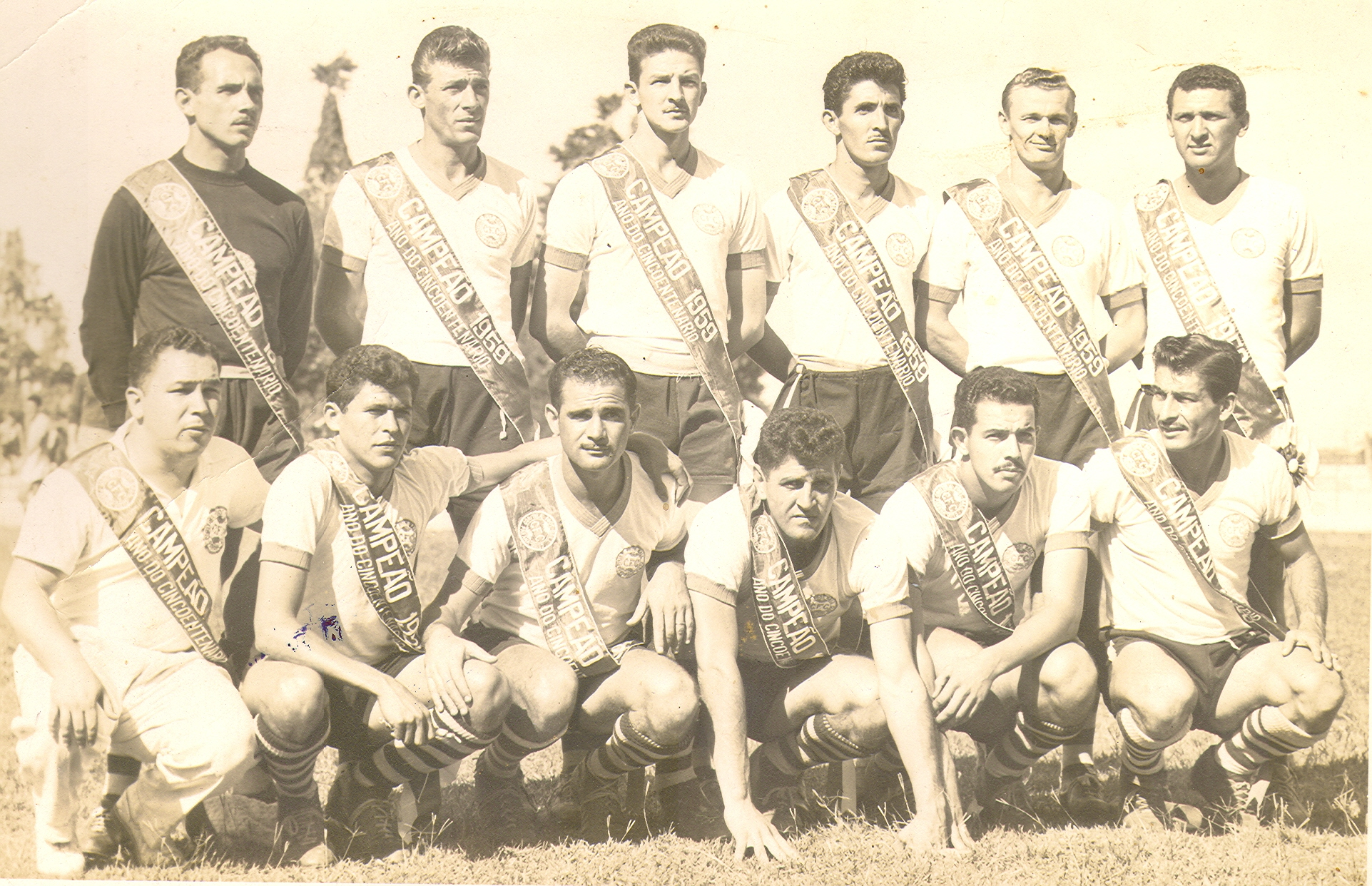
Coritiba 1959

The 1950s was a successful decade for Coritiba. The club won the Torneio Triangular de Curitiba in 1950, and the Torneio Quadrangular Interestadual and Torneio Quadrangular de Londrina in 1953. They won the Campeonato Paranaense six times: 1951, 1952, 1954, 1956, 1957 and 1959.

In 1960, Coritiba won the Campeonato Paranaense again. In that year, the club lost the famous coin game to Grêmio for the title of Taça Brasil. After three draws between the clubs, the title was decided with the flip of a coin. In 1967, Evangelino da Costa Neves became the new president of Coritiba and he stayed at the helm for more than twenty years. On August 6, Coritiba defeated Atlético Madrid of Spain in Belfort Duarte 3–2, with three goals from Walter. On December 12, Coritiba beat the Hungary national side 1–0 at Belfort Duarte.

In 1968, Coritiba ended a draught of eight years without titles when they became champion of the Campeonato Paranaense, also winning the Torneio Internacional de Verão. On June 2, Coritiba played Napoli of Italy, at Belfort Duarte. On November 13, Coritiba played the Brazil national team, losing 2–1.

In 1969, Coritiba embarked on its first international tour, playing friendlies in Germany, Austria, Bulgaria, the Netherlands and Belgium, and participating in the III Torneio Cidade de Murcia (III Tournament in Murcia), in Spain. The club won the Pierre Colon Cup in France as well. Coritiba played against the likes of Valencia of Spain, Borussia Dortmund of Germany, Bordeaux of France, Feyenoord of the Netherlands, Austria Vienna of Austria, Levski Sofia of Bulgaria, and Anderlecht of Belgium.

- Krüger, the "Flecha Loira": A life dedicated of Coritiba.
- Fedato, the "Estampilla Rubia": He was the biggest defender of history of Coritiba and Paraná soccer.
- Duílio: He was the best scorer of history of Coritiba and Campeonato Paranaense.
- Miltinho: During 13 years, he was titular of Coritiba and all of Paraná state team

=== 1970s ===
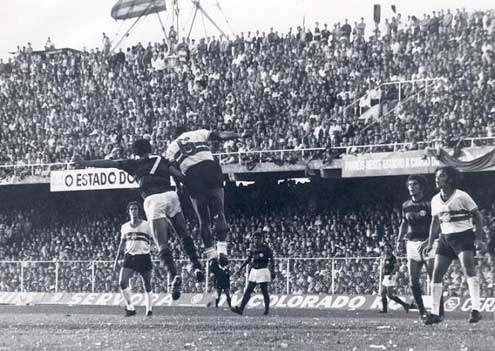
Atletiba, 1972

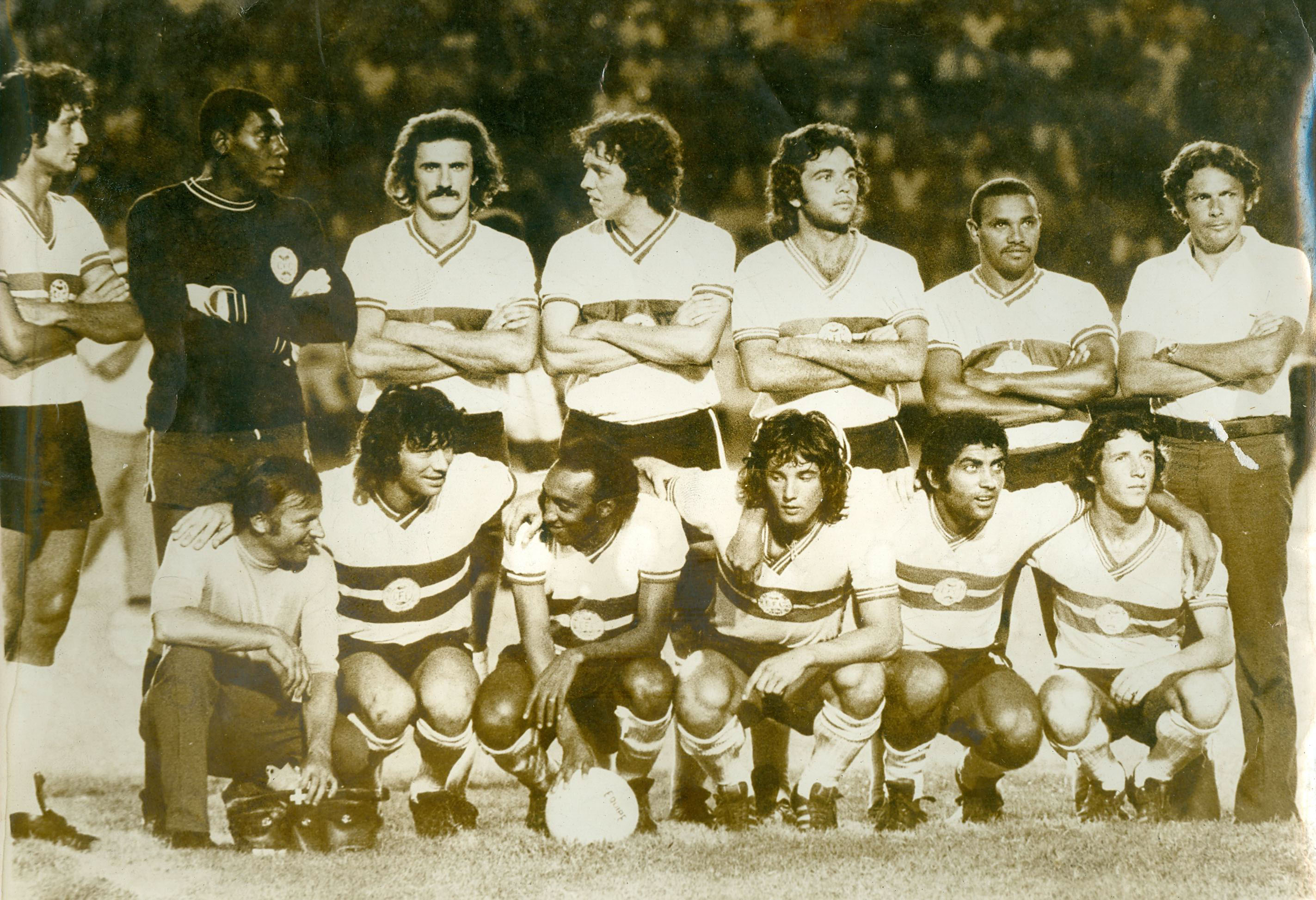
Coritiba 1973

In 1970, in order to rally their fans and boost their finances for an expansion of the Belfort Duarte Stadium, the president Evangelino adopted the strategy used by rivals Atlético-PR, making some major signings. The first wave included players like Rinaldo (Palmeiras), Joel Mendes (Santos) and Hidalgo (XV de Piracicaba). The club embarked on another international tour, this time playing against clubs in France, Yugoslavia, Algeria, Romania and Portugal, as well as the Algeria national side and Sporting CP. Coritiba won the Torneio Internacional de Verão in 1970 and 1971.

In 1971, Coritiba started what is known as The Golden Decade, winning six consecutive state championships (in 1971, 1972, 1973, 1974, 1975 and 1976) – a record in Parana state football history. On January 18, 1971, Coritiba played the France national side, who had just beaten Argentina, at Belfort Duarte and won 2–1.

In 1972, on a third international tour, the club played friendlies in Algeria and Morocco, and took part in a tournament in Turkey. On this tour, Coritiba played against Fenerbahçe, as well as the national sides of both Turkey and Morocco. Returning undefeated to Coritiba, they received the Fita Azul. In the same year, Coritiba played Benfica from Portugal, and the national sides of both Hungary and Congo at Belfort Duarte.

In 1973, Coritiba won the Torneio do Povo, becoming the first team from southern Brazil to win a national title. On June 18, Coritiba beat the Paraguaya national side 1–0 at Belfort Duarte. Coritiba won the Quadrangular de Goiás in 1975 and Taça Cidade de Curitiba/Taça Clemente Comandulli in 1976 and 1978. In 1977, the name of the Belfort Duarte stadium was changed to Major Antônio Couto Pereira, and, in 1978 and 1979, Coritiba won two Campeonatos Paranaense. The club ended the 1970s with eight state championships and, in 1979, finished third in the national Brasileirão.

- Jairo, the "Pantera": He was the player who wear shirt of club more time.

=== 1980s ===
In 1980, Coritiba finished fourth in the Brasileirão, beating both Ferroviário and Desportiva with a 7–1 scoreline. After this, however, Coritiba encountered both an administrative and a financial crisis, leaving the team without any important titles until 1985.

In 1981, the club won a Quadrangular do Trabalhador, and due to the poor campaigns in Campeonato Paranaense, participated in 1981 and 1983 Taça da Prata, the second division of Brasileirão. In 1983, they beat Torneio Ak-Waba, from the Ivory Coast. In this tournament, Coritiba played Bulgaria national team twice, because the Bulgarians, not disheartened after losing the first match 2–0, challenged Coritiba to a rematch. This ended in a 1–1 draw. In 1984, Coritiba returned to the Brasileirão, finishing in eighth place.

==== 1985 – Brasileirão champion ====
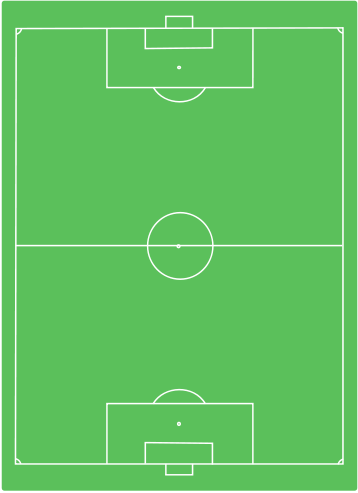

Coritiba team that defeated Bangu in the Final of the 1985 Brazilian Football Championship.

1985 saw the most glory for football both in Coritiba and Paraná thus far. The club began the season with Dino Sani as head coach. But after a mediocre start to the season, the club's board decided to appoint Ênio Andrade in search for bigger aspirations. He arrived with a clear tactical philosophy, drastically changing the training sessions to focusing on physical fitness regimens.

However, Andrade's drastic change in tactics had a negative effect in the beginning; in his first five games, his team lost four games in a row. But after these first few games, Andrade changed the tactics once more and found something he could exploit; the attacking line, which was composed of Toby, Lela, and Indio. This physical improvement was essential in the latter stages of the Brasileirao, as Coritiba took advantage of the low stamina of their rivals low stamina in the final minutes of their matches and as a result scored many late goals.

In the semi-finals, Coritiba beat Atletico Mineiro 1–0 over two legs. In the final against Bangu, Coritiba scored first through a free kick by Indio, and ten minutes later Bangu tied the score. The score was 1–1 at the end of 90 minutes, so the match went into extra time, where nobody could find a winner and the match went into penalties. With the penalty shootout underway, and the score at 5–5, Bangu's Ado missed a penalty, which meant if Coritiba scored, they would become champions of Brazil. Gomes stepped up and scored the penalty to make Coritiba league champion for the first time in its history in the iconic Maracana. Due to Bangu being a club based in Rio de Janeiro, fans of Vasco, Flamengo, Fluminense, Botafogo and other Rio-based clubs attended to support Bangu, totalling more than 90,000 fans. Coritiba's title was strange because it was one of the first teams to win the title with a negative goal difference.

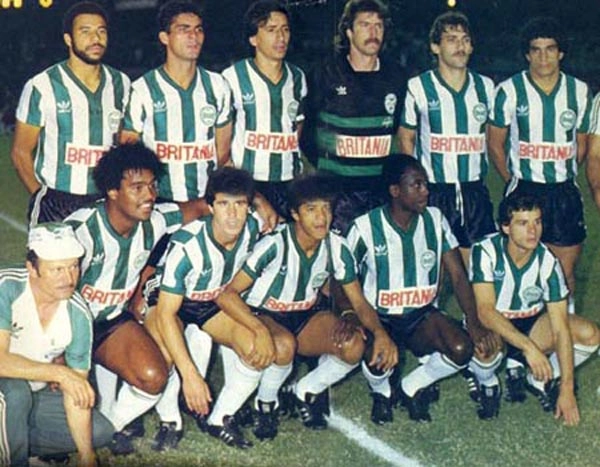
Coritiba – Brazilian Champion

In the same year as their national title, Coritiba also won the Torneio Maurício Fruet, as well as participating in two friendly games against Cerro Porteño. They drew 0–0 in their first friendly, hosted in Asuncion (Paraguay), but won the second 2–0 in Couto Pereira.

In 1986, Coritiba made their Copa Libertadores debut, becoming the first team from the state to participate in the competition. In this year, Coritiba won the Campeonato Paranaense. In 1987, Coritiba were invited to join Clube dos 13 and participate in Copa União (União Cup).

In 1989, Coritiba won the Campeonato Paranaense. In this year, they played a good campaign in Brasileirão, but refused to agree to a change in the calendar of play which meant the club were to play the day before playing Vasco da Gama – their main opponent in their group. Coritiba therefore did not go to the match against Santos, supposed to be held in Juiz de Fora, and was punished by CBF with an automatic loss of 1–0, the loss of five points and thus fell to Série B. On June 18, Coritiba beat the Japan national team 1–0 in Couto Pereira.

=== 1990s ===
In the year of 1990, the drama of the previous year was still being felt. The club entered a new crisis, which eventually spanned the first half of the decade. Nevertheless, Coritiba made a good performance in Copa do Brasil of 1991, reaching the semi-finals. After two years in Série B, in 1992, Coritiba moved once again up a division, falling yet again in 1993. In 1995, with a loss to Matsubara, Evangelino Neves was pressed to leave the club. Édison Mauad, Sérgio Prosdócimo and Joel Malucelli assumed presidency and fought to beat public doubts about the club. They were successful, and Coritiba moved back up to Série A.

In the state competition, however, Coritiba's winning spell was over. They came close in 1995 in an exciting final against rival Paraná (team), but unfortunately Coritiba eventually lost the match, held in Pinheirão, 1–0. The team came close again in 1996, but did not reach the final.

In 1997, Coritiba were the champions of the Festival Brasileiro de Futebol. Although the championship was not as highly regarded as others they had previously won, the club were struggling so the title was very well celebrated by the Coritiba fans. In the next year, January 19, Coritiba won 3–1 in a friendly against the Jamaica national team, who a month later participated in the World Cup. In the 1998 Brasileirão, Coritiba produced a great performance, ending the first phase in third place. In the knockout phase though, they were eliminated by Portugal, ending the competition in sixth place.

In 1999, Coritiba returned to the Campeonato Paranaense, winning the state title after a nine-year hiatus.

=== 2000s ===
In 2001, Coritiba had a good first semester, becoming vice-champion of Copa Sul-Minas (South-Minas Cup), and reaching the semi-finals of the Copa do Brasil. But in the Campeonato Paranaense, the club were eliminated in the semi-finals, yet again for Paraná state. Fernando Miguel scored a goal for Coritiba in the 93rd minute (48th minute of the second half).

In 2002, after a bad beginning, Coritiba improved throughout the season. They did, however, lose against Gama.

In 2003, as well as being unbeaten champions of Campeonato Paranaense, they were fifth in Brasileirão, and were allowed to play in the Libertadores da América the next year.

In 2004, they won the Campeonato Paranaense again and participated in the Sul-Americanas and Libertadores da América cups.

In 2005, after a bad campaign in the Campeonato Brasileiro, the team fell to Série B of the competition. In that year, Coritiba had the fourth highest average attendance of the tournament, with 18,688 per match.

2006 brought coach Marcio Araújo to Coritiba, and later Estevam Soares. After eliminations from the Campeonato Paranaense and Copa do Brasil, Estevam was fired, and was replaced by Paulo Bonamigo. During Campeonato, Coritiba won a number of rounds, but ended the championship in sixth place, so did not move up to Série A.

In 2007, Guilherme Macuglia was the new boss. He was in command during the Campeonato Paranaense, Copa do Brasil, and for part of the Campeonato Brasileiro. In July 2007, Renê Simões was hired as the new boss after the sacking of Macuglia. During this period, the players were revealed: people like defender Henrique, the midfielders Marlos and Pedro Ken, and striker Keirrison, as well as players such as Gustavo, Túlio and goalkeeper Edson Baston. On November 3, with four games to spare, Coritiba were back up to Série A of Brasileirão, drawing with Vitória, in Couto Pereira. On November 24, in their last game, with a victory against Santa Cruz in Estádio do Arruda (Arruda Stadium), Coritiba were champions of Serie B in 2007.

In 2009, Coritiba fell to Série B after a tie with Fluminense, the result was a sports riot in the stadium that left 18 injured, damages of R$500 thousand and 6 Coritiba fans in prison.

=== 2010s ===
In 2010, Coritiba won the Campeonato Paranaense, and the Coritiba fans celebrated the title early against their greatest rival with a 2–0 victory in Couto Pereira. There were goals from Marcos Aurélio and Geraldo. During the Campeonato Brasileiro, Coritiba were not the favorite for the title, because they had lost in Couto Pereira for 10 games. When they returned to Couto Pereira they were first in table. They won again on September 18, with a victory of 2–0 against Portuguesa, with 30,414 fans making a big party.

On November 9, 2010, three games early, Coritiba were back to Série A after a 3–2 win against Duque de Caxias in São Januário. On November 20, with a draw against Icasa in Romeirão, Coritiba were champions of Série B one game early.

On April 24, 2011, the club needed only a draw to win the state championship title a game early, and pulled it off: Coritiba were champion of Campeonato Paranaense again, after defeating Atlético Paranaense 3–0, in a game in Arena da Baixada. The two-time state champions were unbeaten, with only two draws.

On April 28, with a 1–0 win against Caxias in an official game for the 8th-finals of Copa do Brasil of 2011, the club entered the history of Brazilian soccer after beating the record for consecutive wins, replacing Palmeiras in 1996, who made 21 victories. With a win against Cianorte, ending the Campeonato Paranaense of 2011 unbeaten, and having thrashed Palmeiras 6–0 for the Copa do Brasil, Coritiba made 24 consecutive victories and 29 undefeated games.

Coritiba qualified in the 2011 Copa do Brasil final, after defeating Ceará. In the final, against Vasco da Gama, they were defeated 1–0 in the first leg, and won 3–2 in the second leg, but did not win the cup because of the away-goals rule.

In 2012, Coritiba won the Campeonato Paranaense and were the three-time champion. They were once again in the final of the Copa do Brasil. But, in the national tournament, they drew 2–1 against Palmeiras. Coritiba almost lost the first match 2–0, in Barueri.

The following few years were yoyo years as the club was relegated in 2017 and in 2020 and never finished in the top 10 of the league.

=== 2020s ===
In May 2023, after transitioning to a Sociedade Anônima do Futebol, the club announced that it had reached an agreement to sell 90% of its stocks to Treecorp, a private equity based in Faria Lima Avenue.

== Retrospects ==
Updated in December 2025.

Competition	S	P	W	D	L	GF	GA	GD	Best placement
Copa Libertadores	2	12	4	5	3	15	13	+2	Group stage
Copa Sudamericana	5	16	5	2	9	17	22	−5	Quarterfinals
Campeonato Brasileiro	43	1.145	396	303	446	1.329	1.413	−84	Winner
Copa do Brasil	32	143	61	39	43	208	147	+61	Runner-up
Copa dos Campeões	1	4	2	0	2	4	6	−2	Semifinals
Campeonato Brasileiro Série B	15	413	185	107	118	543	421	+122	Winner
Torneio do Povo	1	8	4	3	1	9	5	+4	Winner
Copa Sul-Minas	3	31	13	10	12	50	57	−7	Runner-up
Copa Sul	1	10	5	1	4	21	18	+3	Second round
Campeonato Sul-Brasileiro	1	10	3	2	5	12	15	−3	4th
Campeonato Paranaense	112	2.261	1.277	536	448	4.550	2.326	+2.224	Winner

In italics, defunct competitions.

== Statistics in Campeonato Brasileiro ==
Year	Position	Competition
2003	5º	Serie A
2004	12º	Serie A
2005	19º	Serie A
2006	6º	Serie B
2007	1º	Serie B
2008	9º	Serie A
2009	17º	Serie A
2010	1º	Serie B
2011	8º	Serie A
2012	13º	Serie A
2013	11º	Serie A
2014	13º	Serie A
2015	14º	Serie A
2016	15º	Serie A
2017	17º	Serie A
2018	10º	Serie B
2019	3º	Serie B
2020	19º	Serie A
2021	3º	Serie B
2022	15º	Serie A
2023	19º	Serie A

== Club ==
=== Name ===
The current and official name of the city of Curitiba was established in 1919, ten years after the foundation of club, which was actually called Coritiba. In the early years of football in Brazil, many English terms were used, such as "match", "ground" and "players". It is likely that the founders of Coritiba used these terms, and the name "Foot Ball Club" was the most correct name at the time. It has not been changed since then.

The name "Curitiba" had gone through many orthographies throughout history, such as Coritiba and Curityba due to cultural diversities throughout the city.

=== Colors and logo ===
The club colors are green and white, the colors of the Paraná state flag. Founded on 12 October 1909, Coritiba is the oldest "green and white" team in Brazilian football.

The club's logo is a green globe with the initials CFC in white across the centre, along with twelve white stylised pine seeds. The logo's colors, green and white, are the same as Paraná state flag's. Coritiba's first logo was simple: a white background inside a green circle, with the initials CFC in green.

=== The team kit ===
Coritiba's first kit was used from 1909 to 1916, and was composed of green and white vertical stripes. Coritiba's second kit, used from 1916 to 1976 was an all-white one.

The current home kit is composed of a white shirt, with two green parallel horizontal stripes and black shorts and white socks. The away kit is composed of a green and white vertical stripes shirt, black shorts and green socks. These kits were adopted in 1976.

Home (2025)	Away (2025)	Third (2025)

1985 Home Kit (National Champion)	1993 Home Kit	2005/06 Home

=== Mascot ===
The club's mascot is an old man nicknamed Vovô Coxa (Grandpa Coxa), and represents the club's tradition of being the oldest football club of Curitiba.

=== Anthem ===
The official club anthem lyrics were composed by Cláudio Ribeiro, and the music by Homero Rébuli. An unofficial anthem exists, titled Coritiba Eterno Campeão (Coritiba the Eternal Champion), which was composed by Francis Night. A third anthem, with lyrics composed by Vinicius Coelho, with music by Sebastião Lima, is also called Eterno Campeão.

=== South American Record ===
As of match played 23 August 2024

Competition	Played	Won	Drew	Lost	GF	GA	GD	Win%
Copa Libertadores	12	4	5	3	15	13	+2	33.33
Copa Sudamericana	16	5	2	9	17	22	−5	31.25
Total	28	9	7	12	32	35	−3	32.14

Season	Competition	Round	Opponents	Home	Away	Aggregate
1986	Copa Libertadores					
1986	Copa Libertadores	Group 3	(Ecuador) Barcelona	0–0	1–1	2nd
1986	Copa Libertadores	Group 3	(Brazil) Bangu	3–1	1–1	2nd
1986	Copa Libertadores	Group 3	(Ecuador) Deportivo Quito	2–0	1–2	2nd
2004	Copa Libertadores	Group 9	(Peru) Sporting Cristal	2–0	1–4	3rd
2004	Copa Libertadores	Group 9	(Argentina) Rosario Central	2–0	0–2	3rd
2004	Copa Libertadores	Group 9	(Paraguay) Olimpia	1–1	1–1	3rd
2004	Copa Sudamericana	1PR	(Brazil) São Caetano	1–2	2–2	3–4
2009	Copa Sudamericana	1R	(Brazil) Vitória	2–0	0–2	2–2 (3-5p)
2012	Copa Sudamericana	2R	(Brazil) Grêmio	3–2	0–1	3–3 (a)
2013	Copa Sudamericana	2R	(Brazil) Vitória	1–0	0–1	1–1 (4-3p)
2013	Copa Sudamericana	R16	(Colombia) Itagüí	0–1	1–2	1–3
2016	Copa Sudamericana	2R	(Brazil) Vitória	1–0	1–2	2–2 (a)
2016	Copa Sudamericana	R16	(Argentina) Belgrano	1–2	2–1	3–3 (4-3p)
2016	Copa Sudamericana	QF	(Colombia) Atlético Nacional	1–1	1–3	2–4

== Market value ==
According to the 2014 ranking of BDO RCS Auditores Independentes consulting, Coritiba has the 13th highest market value of Brazilian football, valued at approximately R$118.5 million. Despite this, in June 2023, Coritiba was sold to the company TreeCorp Investimentos for a value of R$1.1 billion.

== Honours ==
=== Official tournaments ===
National
Competitions	Titles	Seasons
Campeonato Brasileiro Série A	1	1985
Campeonato Brasileiro Série B	3	2007, 2010, 2025
State
Competitions	Titles	Seasons
Campeonato Paranaense	39	1916, 1927, 1931, 1933, 1935, 1939, 1941, 1942, 1946, 1947, 1951, 1952, 1954, 1956, 1957, 1959, 1960, 1968, 1969, 1971, 1972, 1973, 1974, 1975, 1976, 1978, 1979, 1986, 1989, 1999, 2003, 2004, 2008, 2010, 2011, 2012, 2013, 2017, 2022
Liga APSA	1	1916^{(1)}

^{(1)} There were two leagues, Coritiba won the APSA League (Paraná Association of Athletic Sports), Britânia won the LSP (Paraná Sportive League), the champions of the two leagues faced each other and after winning the decision, Coritiba won the unified title of 1916.

- record

=== Others tournaments ===
==== International ====
- Antonio Bau Uruios Trophy (1): 1968
- Curitiba International Summer Tournament (3): 1968, 1970, 1971
- Pierre Colon Cup (1): 1969
- Algeria-Morocco Tournament (1): 1972
- Akwaba Cup (1): 1983

==== National ====
- Torneio do Povo (1): 1973
- Festival Brasileiro de Futebol (1): 1997

==== Inter-state ====
- Taça Dr. Aderbal Ramos da Silva (1): 1942
- Torneio Paraná-Bahia (1): 1953
- Torneio Paraná-São Paulo (1): 1954
- Torneio Quadrangular de Goiânia (1): 1975
- Torneio Quadrangular do Trabalhador (1): 1981
- Torneio Maurício Fruet (1): 1985

==== State ====
- Campeonato Paranaense – First stage (10): 1942, 1943, 1954, 1956, 1957, 1976, 1983, 1984, 2011, 2013
- Campeonato Paranaense – Second stage (7): 1941, 1945, 1975, 1976, 1986, 2011, 2012
- Campeonato Paranaense – Third stage (2): 1974, 1979
- Campeonato Paranaense – South zone (3): 1959, 1960, 1962
- Taça Dionísio Filho (1): 2018
- Torneio Início do Paraná (11): 1917, 1920, 1921, 1930, 1932, 1939, 1941, 1942, 1951, 1952, 1957
- Torneio Centro de Cronistas Esportivos (1): 1932
- Torneio Imprensa (1): 1943
- Torneio Getúlio Vargas (1): 1944
- Torneio Nova Constituinte (1): 1946
- Copa Foz do Iguaçu – Troféu 100 Anos (1): 2014

==== City ====
- Liga Curitibana (5): 1931, 1933, 1935, 1939, 1941
- Taça Cidade de Curitiba (3): 1945, 1976, 1978
- Torneio Encerramento (1): 1918
- Torneio da Cruz Vermelha (1): 1920
- Torneio Tiradentes (1): 1921
- Torneio Festival Esportivo do América-PR (1): 1922
- Taça Fox (1): 1927
- Festival do Guarany SC (1): 1931
- Festival do Coritiba (1): 1932
- Taça Concórdia (1): 1933
- Torneio Arthur Friedenreich (1): 1934
- Torneio Extra (2): 1934, 1945
- Torneio Festival da FPD (1): 1938
- Festival do Britania (1): 1939
- Torneio Relâmpago (1): 1943
- Torneio Noturno (1): 1943

=== Runners-up ===
- Copa do Brasil (2): 2011, 2012
- Campeonato Brasileiro Série B (1): 1995
- Copa Sul-Minas (1): 2001
- Campeonato Paranaense (23): 1918, 1919, 1920, 1936, 1943, 1944, 1945, 1950, 1962, 1970, 1977, 1983, 1984, 1990, 1995, 1996, 1998, 2000, 2005, 2015, 2016, 2018, 2020
- Copa Paraná (1): 2003

=== Youth team ===
- Copa do Brasil Sub-20 (1): 2021
- Taça Belo Horizonte de Juniores (1): 2010
- Copa Votorantim Sub-15 (1): 2012

=== Awards ===
- Guinness World Record for Consecutive Wins (1): 2011 to 2015
- Fita Azul (1): 1972

Fita Azul do Futebol Brasileiro (Brazilian Football Blue Ribbon) was an award given for the club which succeeds in an excursion out of the country.

=== Women's Football ===
- Campeonato Paranaense de Futebol Feminino (2): 2025, 2026

== Honours in other sports ==
=== American football ===
- Campeonato Brasileiro (4): 2013, 2014, 2022, 2025
- Liga Brasileira – Divisão Azul (2): 2010, 2011
- Superliga Centro-Sul (2): 2014, 2015
- Conferência Sul (6): 2010, 2011, 2012, 2013, 2017, 2025
- Torneio Touchdown – Divisão Sul (1): 2009
- Copa Sul de Flag Football (1): 2023
- Campeonato Paranaense (13): 2009, 2010, 2011, 2012, 2013, 2014, 2015, 2018, 2022, 2023, 2024, 2025, 2026
- Campeonato Paranaense de Flag Football (2): 2024, 2025
- Campeonato Brasileiro Under-20 (1): 2022

=== Athletics ===
- Campeonato Paranaense (2nd place overall): 1932
  - Gold Medal - 5000 metres (Cesar Nunes)
  - Gold Medal - Shot put (Lothar Kruger)
  - Gold Medal - 4 × 100 metres relay
- Campeonato de Novíssimos (3rd place overall): 1932
  - Gold Medal - Shot put (Lothar Kruger)
  - Gold Medal - Discus throw (Lothar Kruger)
  - Gold Medal - Long jump (Lothar Kruger)

=== Basketball ===
- Campeonato Paranaense (2): 1944, 1945
- Campeonato Metropolitano (9): 1930, 1931, 1932, 1935, 1936, 1937, 1940, 1944, 2019
- Super Torneio 3x3 (1): 2022
- Campeonato Paranaense Under-22 (1): 2022
- Campeonato Paranaense Under-19 (1): 2019

=== Cycling ===
- Quilômetro (1): 1952 (Alfredo Carlos Langner)
- Campeonato Paranaense de Resistência - Primeira Categoria (1): 1953 (Guilherme Matter)
- Campeonato Paranaense de Resistência - Segunda Categoria (3): 1953 (Ney Rarracha e Onadir Portella), 1959 (Augusto C. Gottschild)

=== E-sports ===
- Dota Pro Circuit – Tour 3: Division II (1): 2021–22
- Apex Legends Split 2 – Challenger Circuit #2 (1): 2023

=== Mixed Martial Arts ===
- Union Fight Show - Welterweight (1): 2025 (André Dedé)
- Liga Monstro Combate 3 - Middleweight (1): 2026 (André Dedé)

=== Seven-a-side football ===
- Liga das Américas (2): 2018, 2019
- Copa da Liga (1): 2026
- Copa Sul (1): 2026
- Copa Paraná (1): 2026
- Taça Governador do Paraná (4): 2017, 2018, 2021, 2022
- Taça Federação (1): 2015
- Taça Curitiba (3): 2016, 2017, 2018
- Campeonato Metropolitano (3): 2017, 2019, 2021
- Taça Trio de Ferro (1): 2019

=== Shooting sports ===
- Campeonato Brasileiro de Tiro ao Alvo (1):
  - Carabina 3 posições: 1957 (Alan Sobocinski)
- Torneio de Eficiência da Federação Paulista de Tiro ao Alvo (1):
  - Tiro rápido e silhuetas: 1959 (Alan Sobocinski)
- Campeonato Paranaense de Tiro ao Alvo (8):
  - Carabina 3 posições: 1953 e 1957 (Alan Sobocinski)
  - Fuzil de guerra: 1953 (Alan Sobocinski)
  - Tiro rápido: 1956 e 1957 (Alan Sobocinski)
  - Carabina 50 e 100 metros: 1956 (Alan Sobocinski)
  - Carabina 50 metros: 1958 e 1959 (Rones Laynes)
- Individual tests (8):
  - Carabina 50 e 100 metros: 1953 (Rones Laynes)
  - Revolver 25 metros: 1956 (Alan Sobocinski)
  - Coritiba Football Club: 1956 (Rones Laynes)
  - Circulo Militar do Paraná: 1956 (Alan Sobocinski)
  - Cel. Brenno Pernetta1: 1957 (Alan Sobocinski)
  - Sociedade Clube Curitibano: 1957 (Alan Sobocinski)
  - Preparatória para Taça Prefeitura Municipal de Curitiba: 1958 (Alan Sobocinski)
  - Conselho Regional de Desportos: 1959 (Rones Laynes)

=== Swimming ===
- Campeonato Paranaense (3rd place overall): 1956

Men's events

  - Bronze: 1500 metre freestyle (Mauro Kapski)
  - Bronze: 200 metres backstroke (Eraldo Graeml)
  - Bronze: 200 metre breaststroke (Luiz Kapski)
  - Bronze: 4 × 100 metre freestyle relay (Team)
  - Bronze: 4 × 200 metre freestyle relay (Team)

Women's events

  - Gold: 200 metre breaststroke (Danace Gehrke)
  - Silver: 100 metre butterfly (Danace Gehrke)
  - Silver: 4 × 100 metre freestyle relay (Team)
  - Silver: 4 × 100 metre medley relay (Team)

=== Volleyball ===
- Torneio Início (1): 1959

== Stadium ==
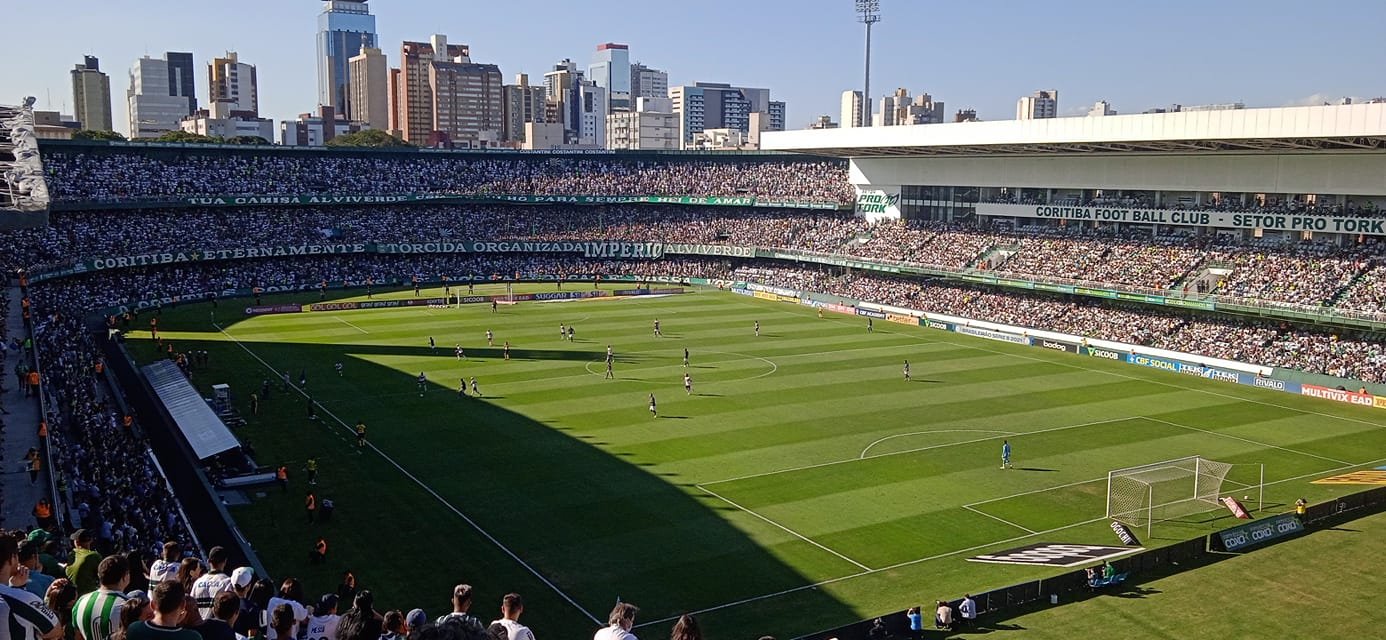
Couto Pereira

Estádio Couto Pereira is Coritiba's home stadium.

- Name: Estádio Major Antônio Couto Pereira
- Capacity: 40,502
- Address: Rua Ubaldino do Amaral, 37
- Record attendance:
  - (General) – 70,000 (Pope John Paul II, 1980)
  - (Game) – The stadium's attendance record in a football match currently stands at 65,943, set on May 15, 1983, when Atlético-PR played against Flamengo (2–0).
- Field dimensions: 105,00m x 69,00m
- Year opened: 1932

Major Antônio Couto Pereira Stadium was founded in 1932 and currently has a capacity of 40,502 people. It is known as Couto Pereira or Alto da Glória by fans and the press.

The land for the stadium was donated by Nicolau Scheffer, or sold for a symbolic price, due to taxes. At the time, it was a remote location, and it was commonly said that it would not be viable due to the distance.

In a renovation that took place in 2005, the dimensions of the pitch were enlarged and the protective fences were removed, facilitating the view of the game from all sectors of the stadium. In addition, equipment such as reserve benches and goals were modernized, as well as the entire pitch was replaced and renovations were made to the internal facilities (changing rooms and rooms).

Originally called Estádio Belfort Duarte, its name was changed to the current one in 1977 after renovations for expansion, as a tribute to one of the people most responsible for the stadium becoming a reality.

== Training Ground Graciosa ==
In 1988, President Bayard Osna ordered the construction of a training center for Coritiba. A land was acquired on the old Estrada da Graciosa (Graciosa's Road), near the Trevo do Atuba, about nine kilometers from the main headquarters, in Alto da Glória (A neighborhood in Curitiba). But it was not until 1995 that the second step was taken. Joel Malucelli, Sérgio Prosdócimo and Édson Mauad took over Coritiba and started the works.

Engineer José Arruda, at the time vice president of the club, was chosen as the person responsible for facing this challenge and he did it with confidence and determination, counting on the support of a competent works committee. Most of the money that made the construction possible came from monthly contributions from the Deliberative Council, presided at the time by Manoel Antonio de Oliveira.

The Graciosa's Training Ground was inaugurated on December 20, 1997. After much dedication and work from everyone who helped, the dream became a reality. In 2002, Giovani Gionédis took over the club and began a bold structural planning, which began with the expansion and modernization of the alviverde heritage.

The Training Center has five official football fields (70x110m), with different pitches. In addition, three dressing rooms, heated swimming pool, parking lot, press committee. For the medical area there is a modern physiology clinic, a complete gym, as well as physiotherapy, psychology and nutrition clinics.

== Supporters ==
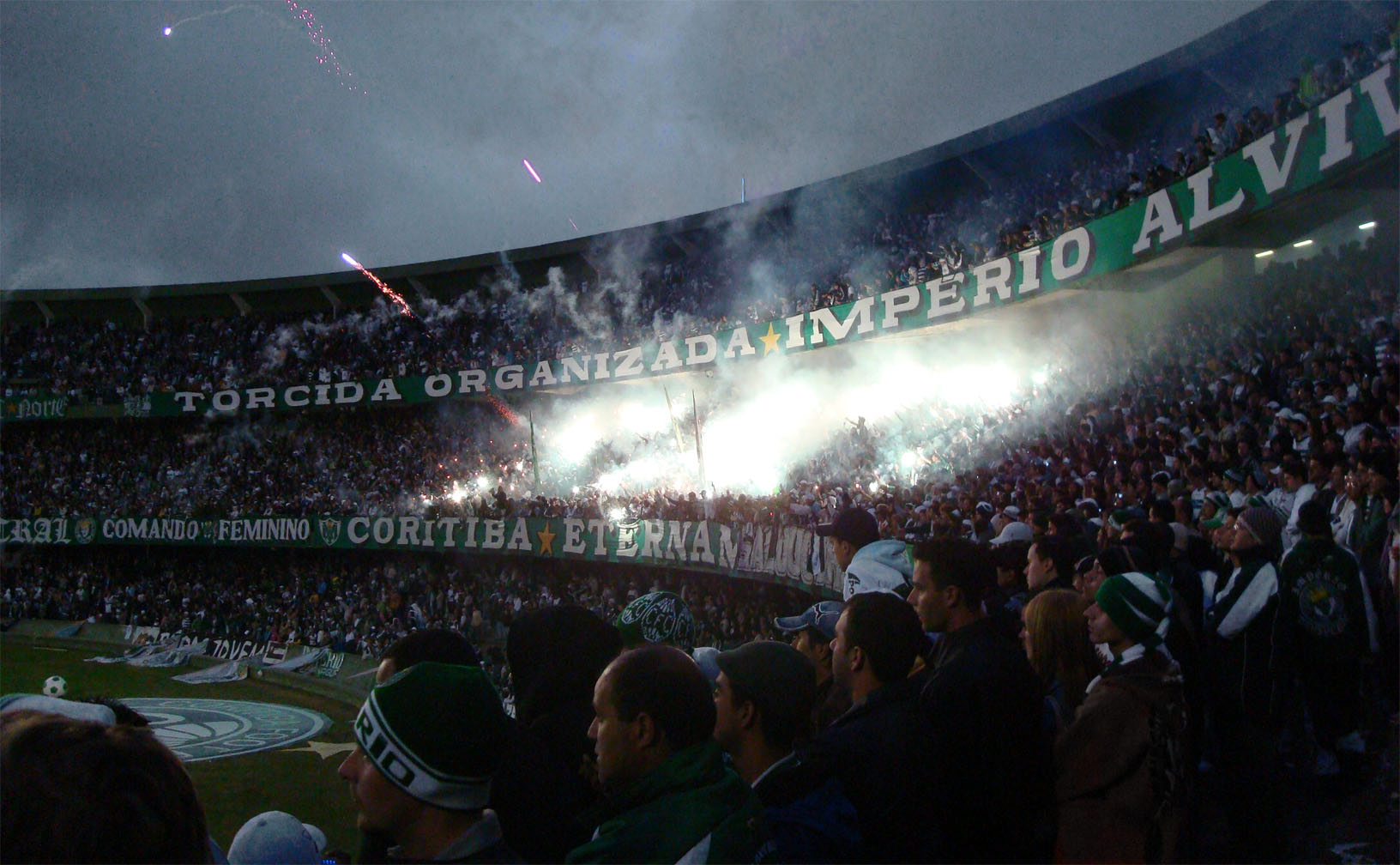
Império Alviverde

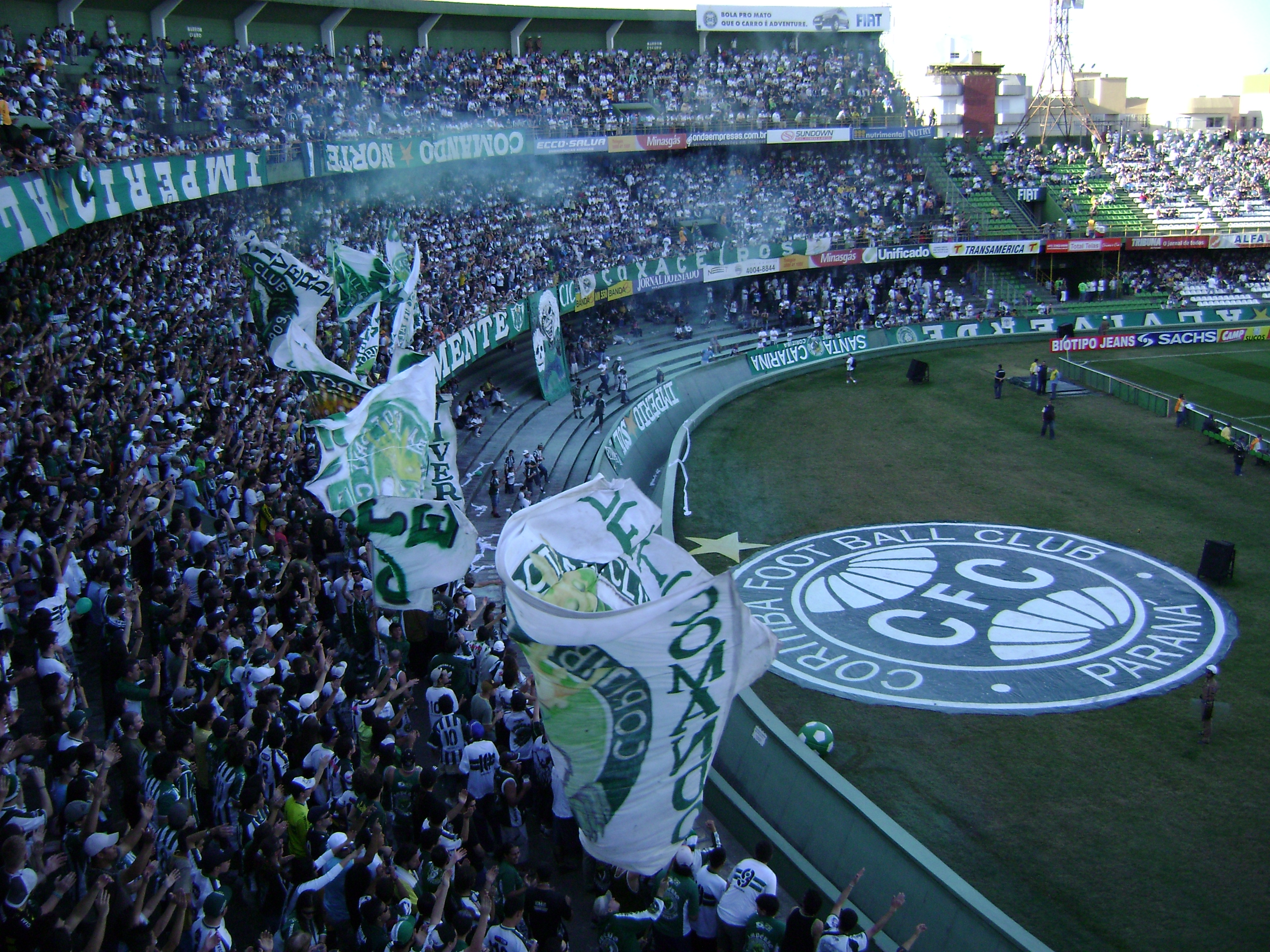
Coritiba's supporters

The club's main organized fan group is Império Alviverde, founded in 1977. The group wears green and white colors and is also known as one of the largest organized fan groups in the Southern Region of Brazil, if not the largest.

In addition to being one of the most traditional clubs in the state, the Coxa Branca fan base is also one of the most traditional in Paraná. Back in 1939, Pinha (Luis Vila), a former Coxa goalkeeper, created the first organized fan group in the state of Paraná, which featured drumming and chants of encouragement, differentiating itself from its rivals.

In 2010, the fans still attended all ten of the team's games in Joinville during the severe punishment imposed on the fan group, bringing a total of 33,156 fans and an average of 3,315 people per game, even playing 130 kilometers away from Curitiba, demonstrating that the strength and passion for the club has no limits.

Traditional throughout the South of Brazil, Coxa's fan base is among the largest among southern clubs. A survey conducted by IBOPE in 2010 points to the Paraná club as the third largest fan base in the Southern Region. The Coritiba fan base still has the highest average attendance in the state championship, holding the highest average in 14 of the last 21 years with registered attendances (1994 to 2019); when not the first, almost always the second, similar to what happens in the Brazilian Championship.

The Coritiba fan base is also known for hosting the Green Hell at Couto Pereira, which leads the fans to innovate more and more in pyrotechnics, smoke, paper, fireworks, and lighting, whether during the night or during the day.

The second largest organized fan group of Coritiba is Dragões Alviverde. Dragões Alviverde was founded in 1996.

== Rivalries ==
Coritiba's biggest rivals are from the same city: Atlético-PR and Paraná Clube. The games between Coritiba and Atlético-PR are called "Atle-Tiba" whilst the games between Coritiba and Paraná are known as "Para-Tiba".

=== Atletiba ===
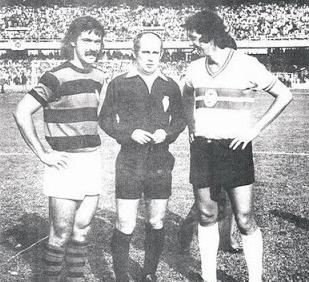
Atletiba (1972)

The Atletiba classic is the name given to the clash between Coritiba and Atlético Paranaense, both clubs from the city of Curitiba, which have been taking place since June 8, 1924, when Verdão thrashed their rivals by a score of 6–3. Over the years, the rivalry has grown, currently considered one of the biggest rivalries in the southern region of the country, as a result of the numerous decisive games that these two rivals have played, making them the clubs with the largest fan bases in the state of Paraná. The biggest thrashing in the clash occurred on November 14, 1959, when Coxa defeated their rivals by 6–0.

=== Paratiba ===
The Paratiba is the classic between Coritiba and Paraná. The first classic, won by Coritiba by 1–0, took place on February 4, 1990. The biggest thrashings of the duel happened in 2002, a 6–1 victory for Paraná, and in 2021, a 5–0 victory for Coxa-Branca.

== Current squad ==
=== First-team squad ===
As of 27 September 2026

Note: Flags indicate national team as defined under FIFA eligibility rules; some limited exceptions apply. Players may hold more than one non-FIFA nationality.

No.	Pos.	Nation	Player
1	GK	BRA	Pedro Morisco
2	DF	BRA	Tinga
3	DF	BRA	Maicon
4	DF	BRA	Rodrigo Moledo
5	MF	URU	Nicolás Fonseca (on loan from León)
6	DF	BRA	Felipe Jonatan
7	FW	URU	Joaquín Lavega (on loan from Fluminense)
10	MF	POR	Josué Pesqueira
11	FW	BRA	Lucas Ronier
13	GK	BRA	Keiller (on loan from Internacional)
14	DF	ARG	Fabricio Bustos
15	MF	COL	Alejandro Ararat (on loan from Independiente Yumbo)
17	FW	URU	Brian Ocampo
18	FW	BRA	Paulo Roberto
19	MF	COL	Sebastián Gómez (captain)
20	FW	BRA	Keno (on loan from Fluminense)
21	DF	BRA	Thiago Santos

No.	Pos.	Nation	Player
22	GK	BRA	Pedro Rangel
23	DF	BRA	Tiago Cóser
25	MF	BRA	Richard
26	DF	BRA	Bruno Melo
28	FW	BRA	Fabinho
32	FW	BRA	Pedro Rocha
36	MF	BRA	Vini Paulista
39	MF	BRA	Gustavo Silva
50	MF	BRA	Vitor Tissi
55	DF	BRA	Jacy Maranhão
66	DF	BRA	Rodrigo Gelado
67	GK	BRA	Benassi
77	FW	BRA	Breno Lopes
78	FW	BRA	Renato Marques (on loan from Mirassol)
86	DF	BRA	Lucas Taverna
99	FW	BRA	Rodrigo Rodrigues

=== Youth team ===
Note: Flags indicate national team as defined under FIFA eligibility rules; some limited exceptions apply. Players may hold more than one non-FIFA nationality.

No.	Pos.	Nation	Player
14	DF	BRA	Gabriel Ibson
33	FW	BRA	David Alves
37	FW	BRA	Lucas Crepaldi

No.	Pos.	Nation	Player
80	MF	BRA	Matheus Dias
—	FW	BRA	Brandão
—	FW	BRA	Éberth

=== Out on loan ===
Note: Flags indicate national team as defined under FIFA eligibility rules; some limited exceptions apply. Players may hold more than one non-FIFA nationality.

No.	Pos.	Nation	Player
—	DF	BRA	Felipe Guimarães (at Atlético Goianiense until 30 November 2026)
—	DF	BRA	Guilherme Aquino (at Avaí until 30 November 2026)
—	DF	BRA	Jamerson Bahia (at Vitória until 31 December 2026)
—	DF	BRA	João Almeida (at Le Mans until 30 June 2027)
—	DF	BRA	Lucas Perez (at Independiente Juniors until 31 December 2026)
—	DF	BRA	Thalisson Gabriel (at Ceará until 31 December 2026)
—	MF	BRA	Geovane Meurer (at Londrina until 30 November 2026)

No.	Pos.	Nation	Player
—	MF	BRA	Jean Gabriel (at Figueirense until 30 November 2026)
—	MF	BRA	Matheus Bianqui (at Novorizontino until 30 November 2026)
—	FW	BRA	Brayan (at Independiente Juniors until 31 December 2026)
—	FW	BRA	David da Hora (at Ponte Preta until 30 November 2026)
—	FW	BRA	Enzo Vagner (at Le Mans until 30 June 2027)
—	FW	BRA	Iury Castilho (at Sport Recife until 30 November 2026)

== Personnel ==
=== Current technical staff ===
Name	Position
(Brazil) Mozart	Head coach
(Brazil) Henrique Américo	Assistant coach
(Brazil) Leonardo Galbes	Assistant coach
(Brazil) Fernando Correa	Goalkeeping coach
(Brazil) Higor Felliny	Goalkeeping coach
(Brazil) Rodrigo Chaves	Fitness coach
(Brazil) Rodrigo Monginho	Fitness coach
(Brazil) Renan Nunes	Fitness coach
(Brazil) Leomir de Souza	Sporting manager

== Club records ==
=== Players ===
The players who played and scored the most goals, and the goalkeepers with the longest time without conceding goals.

==== Most appearances ====
#	Player	Years	Matches
1	(Brazil) Jairo	1972–1976, 1982–1987	410
2	(Brazil) Aladim	1973–1977, 1979–1980, 1983–1985	402
3	(Brazil) Nilo	1968–1976	386
4	(Brazil) Hermes	1970–1972, 1974–1978, 1983	366
5	(Brazil) Nico	1959–1971	352
6	(Brazil) Miltinho	1949–1963	346
7	(Brazil) Reginaldo Nascimento	1997–2005	338
8	(Brazil) Vanderlei	2007–2014	301
9	(Brazil) Wilson	2015–2022	296
10	(Brazil) Cláudio Marques	1969–1975, 1978–1979	295

==== Most goals ====
#	Player	Years	Goals
1	(Brazil) Duílio	1954–1963	254
2	(Brazil) Neno	1941–1947, 1951–1953	134
3	(Brazil) Ivo	1951–1961	129
4	(Brazil) Miltinho	1949–1963	96
4	(Brazil) Baby	1950–1970	96
6	(Poland) Staco	1923–1932	89
7	(Brazil) Zé Roberto	1971–1974	72
7	(Brazil) Keirrison	2006–2008, 2012–2015, 2017–2018	72
9	(Brazil) Alex	1995–1997, 2013–2014	69
10	(Brazil) Chicão	1988–1990	65

==== Foreigners players ====
#	Player	Years	Matches	Goals
1	(Argentina) Dreyer	1972–1975	132	17
2	(Angola) Geraldo	2010–2014	122	13
3	(Colombia) Sebastián Gómez	2023–	102	5
4	(Argentina) Ariel Nahuelpán	2008–2010	84	31
5	(Poland) Staco	1923–1932	81	89
6	(Paraguay) Struway	1998–1999	79	4
7	(Uruguay) Sanguinetti	1951–1955	65	1
8	(Germany) Hanz Breyer	1939–1944	58	1
9	(Portugal) Josué	2024–	55	8
10	(Germany) Bahu	1919–1926	47	1

==== Time without conceding goals ====
#	Player	Years	Minutes
1	(Brazil) Jairo	1972	937
2	(Brazil) Manga	1978	873
2	(Brazil) Joel Mendes	1978	873
3	(Brazil) Jairo	1973	845
4	(Brazil) Édson Bastos	2008	829
5	(Brazil) Jairo	1973	786
6	(Brazil) Luís Henrique	1991	726
7	(Brazil) Jairo	1974	637
8	(Brazil) Vaná	2015	612
9	(Brazil) Roberto Costa	1981	601
10	(Brazil) Pedro Morisco	2025	578

=== Managers ===
Managers with the most games in charge of Coritiba.

==== Most appearances ====
#	Manager	Years	Matches
1	(Uruguay) Felix Magno	1949–51, 1954–59, 1965–66	201
2	(Brazil) Dirceu Krüger	1979–1997	185
3	(Brazil) Marcelo Oliveira	2011–2012, 2017	153
4	(Brazil) Tim	1971, 1973, 1979	126
4	(Brazil) Paulo César Carpegiani	1990, 1995, 2016–2017	126
5	(Brazil) Paulo Bonamigo	2002–2003, 2006	123
5	(Brazil) Marquinhos Santos	2012–2013, 2014–2015	123
6	(Brazil) Ney Franco	2009–2010, 2015	111
7	(Paraguay) Gustavo Morínigo	2020–2022	100
8	(Brazil) Antônio Lopes	2004–2005	96
9	(Brazil) Ivo Wortmann	2000–2001, 2009	93
10	(Brazil) Ênio Andrade	1979, 1985	79

==== Foreigners managers ====
#	Manager	Years	Matches
1	(Uruguay) Felix Magno	1949–51, 1954–59, 1965–66	201
2	(Paraguay) Gustavo Morínigo	2020–2022	100
3	(Argentina) Filpo Núñez	1970	31
3	(Argentina) Armando Renganeschi	1974–1975	31
4	(Uruguay) Sebastian Beracochea	1962–1963	30
5	(Argentina) Dreyer	1981–82	27
6	(Paraguay) Sinforiano García	1961	19
7	(Portugal) António Oliveira	2023	15
8	(Uruguay) Sérgio Ramirez	1991	13
8	(Uruguay) Darío Pereyra	1998	13
9	(Uruguay) Pedro Rocha	1987	9
10	(Peru) Darío Letona	1949	0

=== Match Records ===
Record	Opponent	Scoreline	Date	Location
First Match	Tiro Pontagrossense	0–1	October 23, 1909	Ponta Grossa
First Official Match	Ponta Grossa	5–3	June 12, 1910	Ponta Grossa
Biggest Win (National Competitions)	Ferroviário	7–1	April 16, 1980	Couto Pereira
Biggest Win (National Competitions)	Desportiva-ES	7–1	May 4, 1980	Couto Pereira
Biggest Win (National Competitions)	Palmeiras	6–0	May 5, 2011	Couto Pereira
Heaviest Defeat (National Competitions)	Grêmio	5–0	February 29, 1984	Olímpico
Heaviest Defeat (National Competitions)	Palmeiras	5–0	August 17, 1996	Parque Antártica

=== Other Records ===
- First goal scorer: Fritz Essenfelter
- Most appearances: 440 appearances by Jairo (1971–77), (1984–87).
- Record goal scorer: 202 goals by Duílio Dias (1954–64).
- Consecutive victories: Coritiba has the Guinness Book worldwide record of consecutive victories (24), achieved between February and May 2011.

== Managers (1934 – present) ==
- (Brazil) Moacyr Gonçalves (?–June 1934)
- (Brazil) Cuka (June 1934–?)
- (Brazil) Hummel Guimarães (1941 – August 1942)
- (Brazil) Joaquim Loureiro (January 1945 – March 1949)
- (Peru) Darío Letona (March 1949 – April 1949)
- (Brazil) Tonico (interim- February 1952 – March 1952)
- (Brazil) Eugenio Vani (March 1952 – June 1953)
- (Brazil) Lula (June 1953 – October 1953)
- (Brazil) Tonico (October 1953 – March 1954)
- (Brazil) Nuno Fernandes (March 1954 – August 1954)
- (Brazil) Arion Cornelsen (August 1954–?? 1954)
- (Brazil) Aroldo Veiga (September 1954 – October 1954)
- (Brazil) Arion Cornelsen (interim- October 1954–?)
- (Paraguay) Sinforiano García (July 1961 – November 1961)
- (Brazil) Miguel Checchia (interim- November 1961–?)
- (Brazil) Jaguanhara Torres (January 1964–?)
- (Brazil) Zinder Lins (October 1964–?)
- (Brazil) Francisco Sarno (May 1968–?)
- (Argentina) Filpo Núñez (December 1969 – August 1970)
- (Brazil) Mauro Ramos (August 1970 – March 1971)
- (Brazil) Lanzoninho (interim- March 1971 – April 1971)
- (Brazil) Tim (April 1971 – December 1971)
- (Brazil) Aymoré Moreira (January 1972 – March 1972)
- (Brazil) Lanzoninho (March 1972 – January 1973)
- (Brazil) Tim (January 1973 – January 1974)
- (Brazil) Lanzoninho (January 1974 – March 1974)
- (Brazil) Yustrich (March 1974 – April 1974)
- (Brazil) Hidalgo (interim- April 1974 – July 1974)
- (Argentina) Armando Renganeschi (July 1974 – March 1975)
- (Brazil) Diede Lameiro (March 1975–?)
- (Brazil) Hélio Alves (interim- August 1975)
- (Brazil) Paulinho de Almeida (August 1975 – October 1975)
- (Brazil) Hélio Alves (October 1975–?)
- (Brazil) Dino Sani (July 1976 – December 1976)
- (Brazil) Mário Juliato (January 1980 – July 1980)
- (Brazil) Daltro Menezes (July 1980–?)
- (Brazil) Nicanor de Carvalho (?–October 1986)
- (Brazil) Dirceu Kruger (interim- October 1986–?)
- (Brazil) Borba Filho (April 1987 – July 1987)
- (Brazil) Pedro Rocha (August 1987–?)
- (Brazil) Valdir Espinosa (1988)
- (Brazil) Rubens Minelli (?–February 1998)
- (Brazil) Nedo Xavier (interim- February 1998)
- (Brazil) Júlio Cezar Leal (February 1998–?)
- (Brazil) Valdir Espinosa (1998)
- (Uruguay) Darío Pereyra (1998)
- (Brazil) Mauro Fernandes (?–April 1999)
- (Brazil) Abel Braga (April 1999–?)
- (Brazil) Paquito (June 2000 – August 2000)
- (Brazil) Fito Neves (August 2000 – September 2000)
- (Brazil) Paquito (interim- September 2000)
- (Brazil) Ivo Wortmann (September 2000 – August 2001)
- (Brazil) Paquito (interim- August 2001)
- (Brazil) Ricardo Gomes (August 2001 – September 2001)
- (Brazil) Ivo Wortmann (September 2001 – December 2001)
- (Brazil) Joel Santana (December 2001 – April 2002)
- (Brazil) Edson Gonzaga (interim- April 2002)
- (Brazil) Paulo Bonamigo (April 2002 – December 2003)
- (Brazil) Antônio Lopes (December 2003 – May 2005)
- (Brazil) Cuca (May 2005 – October 2005)
- (Brazil) Antônio Lopes Júnior (interim) (October 2005)
- (Brazil) Cláudio Marques (interim) (October 2005)
- (Brazil) Márcio Araújo (October 2005 – February 2006)
- (Brazil) Estevam Soares (March 2006 – May 2006)
- (Brazil) Paulo Bonamigo (May 2006 – November 2006)
- (Brazil) Gilberto Pereira (December 2006 – January 2007)
- (Brazil) Guilherme Macuglia (January 2007 – June 2007)
- (Brazil) Renê Simões (June 2007 – November 2007)
- (Brazil) Ivo Wortmann (December 2008 – April 2009)
- (Brazil) Edison Borges (interim – April 2009)
- (Brazil) René Simões (April 2009 – August 2009)
- (Brazil) Ney Franco (August 2009 – September 2010)
- (Brazil) Marcelo Oliveira (November 2010 – September 2012)
- (Brazil) Marquinhos Santos (September 2012 – September 2013)
- (Brazil) Marcelo Serrano (Interim- September 2013)
- (Brazil) Péricles Chamusca (September 2013 – November 2013)
- (Brazil) Tcheco (Interim- November 2013 – December 2013)
- (Brazil) Dado Cavalcanti (December 2013 – March 2014)
- (Brazil) Celso Roth (April 2014 – August 2014)
- (Brazil) Marquinhos Santos (August 2014 – June 2015)
- (Brazil) Ney Franco (June 2015 – November 2015)
- (Brazil) Pachequinho (Interim- November 2015/November 2015 – December 2015)
- (Brazil) Gilson Kleina (December 2015 – June 2016)
- (Brazil) Paulo César Carpegiani (August 2016 – February 2017)
- (Brazil) Pachequinho (Interim- March 2017 – May 2017/May 2017 – July 2017)
- (Brazil) Marcelo Oliveira (July 2017 – December 2017)
- (Brazil) Sandro Forner (December 2017 – April 2018)
- (Brazil) Eduardo Baptista (April 2018 – August 2018)
- (Brazil) Tcheco (Interim- August 2018 – September 2018)
- (Brazil) Argel Fucks (September 2018 – February 2019)
- (Brazil) Matheus Costa (interim- February 2019)
- (Brazil) Umberto Louzer (February 2019 – September 2019)
- (Brazil) Jorginho (September 2019 – December 2019)
- (Brazil) Eduardo Barroca (December 2019 – August 2020)
- (Brazil) Jorginho (August 2020 – October 2020)
- (Brazil) Pachequinho (interim- October 2020)
- (Brazil) Rodrigo Santana (October 2020 – December 2020)
- (Brazil) Pachequinho (interim- December 2020 – January 2021)
- (Paraguay) Gustavo Morínigo (January 2021 – August 2022)
- (Brazil) Guto Ferreira (August 2022 – December 2022)
- (Portugal) António Oliveira (December 2022 – April 2023)
- (Brazil) Antônio Carlos Zago (April 2023 – June 2023)
- (Brazil) Thiago Kosloski (interim- June 2023 – July 2023/July 2023 – November 2023)
- (Brazil) Guilherme Bossle (interim- November 2023)
- (Brazil) Guto Ferreira (November 2023–present)

== Players ==
=== Greats squads of Coritiba ===
Some magazines polled for the best Coritiba team of all time, composed of the best Coritiba players of all time. Only two players were present in all polls, Fedato and Miltinho. Jairo, Hildago, Nilo, Krügger and Zé Roberto appear in two of three lists:

Grandes Times Brasileiros (1971)
Joel – Tonico, Fedato, Pescuma, Carazzai – Miltinho, Hidalgo, Tião Abatiá – Baby, Ivo, Ronald

Lance! – Especial (2005)
Jairo – Hermes, Fedato, Oberdan, Nilo – Miltinho, Hidalgo, Alex, Krügger – Zé Roberto, Aladim

Placar – Especial (2009)
Jairo – Ninho, Fedato, Pizzatinho, Nilo – Miltinho, Zé Roberto, Krügger – Lela, Duílio, Pachequinho

== Manufacturers and shirt sponsors ==
Period	Manufacturers	Sponsors
1970-1976	Athleta	—
1977	Terres	—
1978-1979	Adidas	—
1980	Penalty	—
1981-1984	Adidas	—
1985	Adidas	Britânia
1986	Adidas	Romani S.A.
1987	Adidas	Müller
1987	Adidas	Coca-Cola
1988	Arcal	Coca-Cola
1989-1990	Campeã	Coca-Cola
1991	Umbro	Coca-Cola
1992-1993	Umbro	Bauducco
1994	Umbro	Renner Herrmann S.A.
1995	Umbro	Sanyo
1996	Umbro	Sanyo
1997-2000	Penalty	Sanyo
2001-2002	Penalty	TIM
2003-2005	Penalty	Claro
2006	Diadora	Radial
2007	Diadora	Mastercorp Ribbons
2008	Lotto	Positivo Informática
2009-2011	Lotto	Banco BMG
2012	Nike	Banco BMG
2013-2016	Nike	Caixa
2016-2018	Adidas	Caixa
2019-2020	1909	Paraná Banco
2021-2023	1909	Neodent
2024-	Diadora	Reals
