= Torneio do Povo =

Brazilian football competition

Torneio do Povo (meaning Tournament of the People) was a competition contested between the most popular Brazilian football clubs between 1971 and 1973. It was organized by the Brazilian Sports Confederation (CBD), and was played in the beginning of the year, starting the season.

The first edition of the competition was between Atlético Mineiro, Corinthians, Flamengo and Internacional. For the second edition, Bahia was invited. Due to its successful performance in the Campeonato Brasileiro second edition, finishing in the fifth place, Coritiba was invited to participate in the competition's third edition, which was promoted by Flamengo's president at the time, André Richer. André Richer considered the idea of inviting Botafogo, which was the 1972 Campeonato Brasileiro runner-up.

== Format ==
In 1971, the competition was a double round-robin format between four teams. The champion was the team with the most points.

In 1972, the competition was also a round-robin format, but the five clubs only played once against each other. The champion was the club with most points.

In 1973, the Torneio do Povo was divided in two rounds. In the first round, the teams played against each other once. The four best placed clubs advanced to the next round. The second round was in a single round-robin format. The champion was the club with the most points.

== List of champions ==
Year	Champions and runners-up
Year	Winner	Runner-up
1971; Details	(São Paulo (state)); Corinthians	(Rio Grande do Sul); Internacional
1972; Details	(Rio de Janeiro (state)); Flamengo	(Minas Gerais); Atlético Mineiro
1973; Details	(Paraná (state)); Coritiba	Bahia

== Torneio do Povo 1971 ==
- Champion: Corinthians
- Runner-up: Internacional

Date	Team #1	Score	Team #2
24 January 1971	Atlético Mineiro	0-0	Flamengo
27 January 1971	Atlético Mineiro	3-3	Corinthians
27 January 1971	Internacional	1-0	Flamengo
30 January 1971	Corinthians	0-0	Flamengo
3 February 1971	Internacional	3-0	Atlético Mineiro
6 February 1971	Corinthians	3-0	Internacional
11 February 1971	Corinthians	0-0	Flamengo
13 February 1971	Atlético Mineiro	0-0	Corinthians
14 February 1971	Flamengo	0-1	Internacional
17 February 1971	Atlético Mineiro	0-0	Internacional
19 February 1971	Atlético Mineiro	3-3	Flamengo
19 February 1971	Corinthians	1-0	Internacional

=== Final standings ===
Team	Pts	Pld	GF	GA	GD	W
Corinthians	8	6	7	3	4	2
Internacional	7	6	5	4	1	3
Atlético Mineiro	5	6	6	9	-3	0
Flamengo	4	6	3	5	-2	0

== Torneio do Povo 1972 ==
- Champion: Flamengo
- Runner-up: Atlético Mineiro

=== Single Round-robin ===
Date	Team #1	Score	Team #2
2 February 1972	Corinthians	0-1	Atlético Mineiro
2 February 1972	Bahia	0-1	Flamengo
6 February 1972	Flamengo	2-0	Atlético Mineiro
6 February 1972	Bahia	0-1	Corinthians
10 February 1972	Internacional	0-0	Corinthians
17 February 1972	Corinthians	1-2	Flamengo
20 February 1972	Bahia	0-0	Atlético Mineiro
20 February 1972	Flamengo	0-0	Internacional
24 February 1972	Atlético Mineiro	2-1	Internacional
27 February 1972	Internacional	4-0	Bahia

=== Final standings ===
Team	Pts	Pld	GF	GA	GD	W
Flamengo	7	4	5	1	4	3
Atlético Mineiro	5	4	3	3	0	2
Internacional	4	4	5	2	3	1
Corinthians	3	4	2	3	-1	1
Bahia	1	4	0	6	-6	0

== Torneio do Povo 1973 ==
- Champion: Coritiba
- Runner-up: Bahia

=== First stage ===
Date	Team #1	Score	Team #2
21 January 1973	Atlético Mineiro	1-2	Coritiba
23 January 1973	Bahia	1-0	Internacional
24 January 1973	Corinthians	0-0	Flamengo
27 January 1973	Bahia	1-0	Coritiba
28 January 1973	Atlético Mineiro	2-3	Flamengo
31 January 1973	Bahia	1-4	Atlético Mineiro
31 January 1973	Coritiba	2-0	Flamengo
31 January 1973	Corinthians	1-0	Internacional
4 February 1973	Atlético Mineiro	0-3	Internacional
7 February 1973	Coritiba	0-0	Corinthians
7 February 1973	Bahia	1-1	Flamengo
12 February 1973	Internacional	1-0	Flamengo
13 February 1973	Bahia	1-0	Corinthians
15 February 1973	Internacional	1-1	Coritiba
16 February 1973	Corinthians	1-0	Atlético Mineiro

=== Standings ===
Team	Pts	Pld	GF	GA	GD	W
Bahia	7	5	5	5	0	3
Coritiba	6	5	5	3	2	2
Corinthians	6	5	2	1	1	2
Internacional	5	5	5	3	2	2
Flamengo	4	5	4	6	-2	1
Atlético Mineiro	2	5	7	10	-7	1

=== Quadrangular Final (Final Stage) ===
Date	Team #1	Score	Team #2
21 February 1973	Coritiba	1-0	Corinthians
21 February 1973	Bahia	1-1	Flamengo
25 February 1973	Flamengo	0-1	Coritiba
27 February 1973	Corinthians	0-0	Bahia
14 March 1973	Bahia	2-2	Coritiba

=== Standings ===
Team	Pts	Pld	GF	GA	GD	W
Coritiba	5	3	4	2	2	2
Bahia	3	3	3	3	0	0
Flamengo	1	2	0	1	-1	0
Corinthians	1	2	1	2	-1	0
