= History of SE Palmeiras =

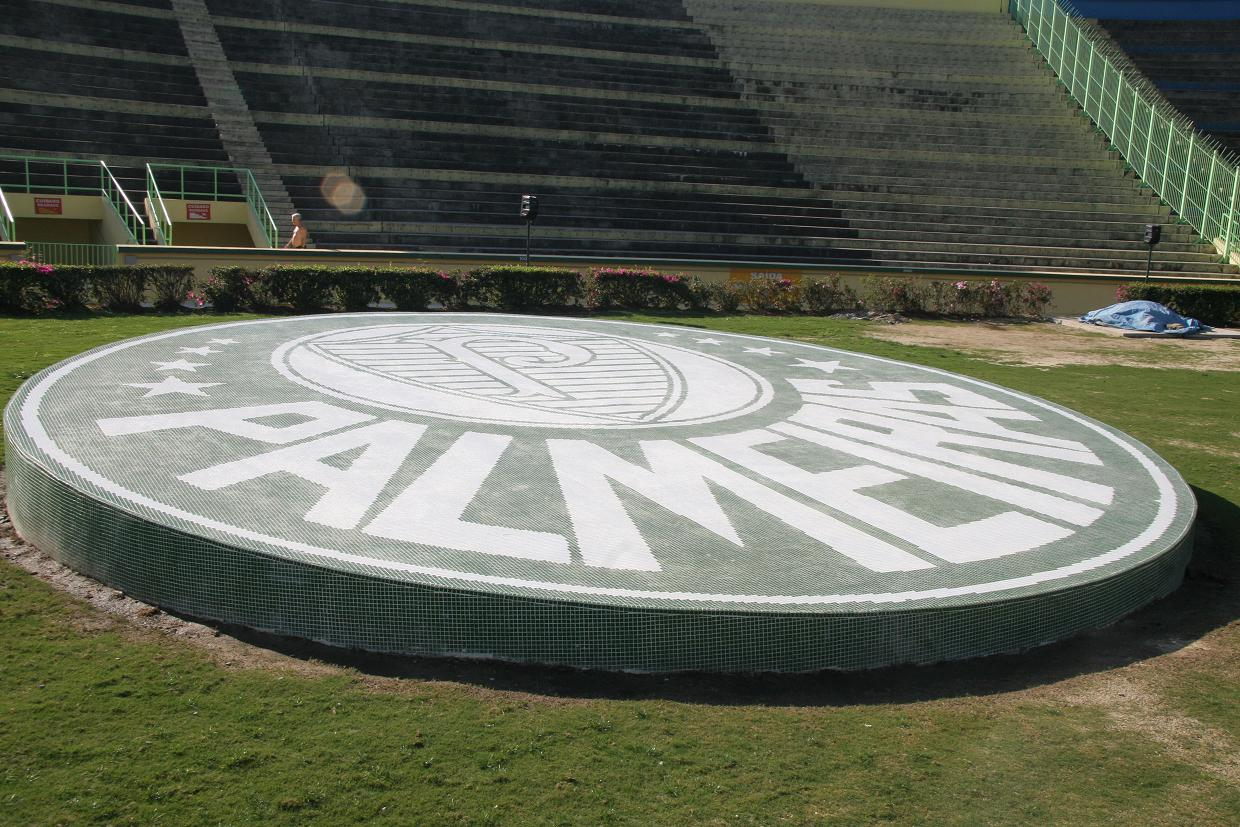
Logo of Palmeiras displayed as a mosaic at the former Palestra Itália Stadium

The following article covers the history of Sociedade Esportiva Palmeiras, a Brazilian multi-sport club based in the city of São Paulo.

Founded by Italian immigrants on August 26, 1914, as Palestra Italia, the green-and-white club was compelled to change its name in 1942 due to conflicts with the Brazilian government during the Vargas Era, adopting the name Sociedade Esportiva Palmeiras.

Palmeiras is one of Brazil's most successful clubs, holding the record as the most decorated national champion with 18 titles. Among its most significant achievements are the 1951 Copa Rio, the Copa Libertadores titles in 1999, 2020, and 2021, 12 Brazilian Championships, and 4 Copa do Brasil titles.

== The birth of Palestra Itália (1914–1942) ==
=== Beginnings ===
The "Savoy Cross," the emblem used by Palestra Itália in 1916.

Palestra Italia was established on August 26, 1914, by Italian immigrants in São Paulo. Its creation was inspired by the presence of two Italian football clubs in Brazil, namely Pro Vercelli and Torino, which motivated the formation of a team to represent São Paulo's Italian community in the Paulista Championship. Key figures in the club's founding included Luigi Cervo and Luigi Marzo, employees of Matarazzo Industries, alongside Vincenzo Ragognetti, a journalist, and Ezequiel Simone, the eldest among them and a member of various Italian cultural organizations. The founding charter was drafted in Italian. Ezequiel Simone served as the first president, holding the position for just nineteen days. The club's establishment followed two meetings: the first on August 19, 1914, where the club's purpose was debated—some advocated for a social and cultural focus, while others pushed for a sports-oriented mission centered on football. A second meeting on August 26, 1914, officially marked the club's founding. Both meetings took place at Rua Marechal Deodoro, number 2, in the Alhambra Salon, near Praça da Sé.

The vast majority of the founders were Italians or their descendants, many employed at Matarazzo Industries. Francisco Camargo, a Portuguese employee of Matarazzo, also participated in the founding meeting and was elected a director. None of the founders were affiliated with other football clubs, except Luigi Cervo, who had been a member and player of the second team of Internacional de SP. Other founders included members of Esperia, an Italian rowing club, such as athlete Delfo Betti.

Between August 1914 and January 1915, Palestra Itália focused on assembling its roster of players and presenting itself to the city, particularly to São Paulo's Italian community. The grand inauguration ball was held on January 9, 1915, at the "Germânia" salons, located at Rua Dom José de Barros, rented for 300,000 réis.

=== The first matches ===
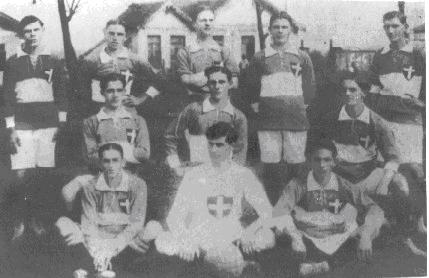
Palestra Itália in 1916

During its first four months, the founders and initial members organized practice matches on a rented field in Vila Mariana, located in what is now Vila Clementino, near the current Ibirapuera Park area. On January 24, 1915, Palestra Italia played its first friendly match against Savoia from Sorocaba (now known as Clube Atlético Votorantim, as the team was based in what was then a district of Sorocaba, now the municipality of Votorantim), winning 2–0 with goals from Bianco and Alegretti. The adopted emblem was the Savoy Cross.

In 1915, unable to secure a spot in the APEA championship, Palestra Itália played only friendly matches. In early 1916, the club capitalized on the difficulties faced by the Associação Paulista de Esportes Atléticos, which managed São Paulo's major football clubs, due to the closure of the Velodrome, the venue for championship matches. Palestra's leadership, with support from Matarazzo Industries, facilitated the transfer of the Velodrome's grandstands to Chácara da Floresta, owned by A.A. Palmeiras, securing the club's entry into the elite Paulista League.

The team's championship debut occurred on May 13, 1916, at Chácara da Floresta, against Associação Atlética Mackenzie College, ending in a 1–1 draw. The lineup was: Julio Fabbrini; Grimaldi and Ricco (captain); Fabbi II, Bianco, and De Biase; Gobbato, Valle II, Vescovini, Bernardini, and Cestari.

In 1917, the team's jersey design changed, removing the horizontal white stripe, and the emblem became a circle with the initials P and I, replacing the Savoy Cross. The team strengthened its squad and achieved its first runner-up finish. The year also marked the first encounters with its future greatest rival, Corinthians, with Palestra winning both matches, 3–0 and 3–1. Two years later, in 1919, Palestra again finished as runner-up.

=== The first titles ===
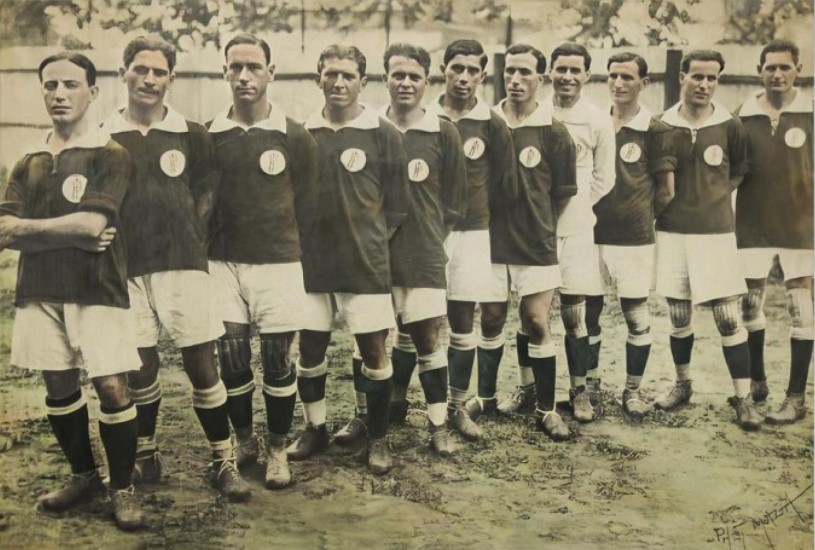
The 1920 Paulista championship-winning squad of Palestra Itália

On April 26, 1920, Palestra Italia acquired 150,000 square meters of land from the Companhia Antarctica Paulista, including the Parque Antarctica Stadium, which at the time featured wooden grandstands.

Later that year, the club won its first title in a dramatic final against Paulistano, the four-time Paulista champion from 1916 to 1919. Both teams tied in points, necessitating an extra match, which Palestra won 2–1 with goals from Martinelli and Forte, breaking their rival's dominance.

In 1921, the team won the Taça Competência (a competition between the capital's champion and the interior's champion). From 1921 to 1923, Palestra Italia finished as runner-up in the Paulista Championship three consecutive times.

In 1925, Palestra made its international debut, touring Argentina and Uruguay. In 1926, the club secured another Paulista title with an impeccable campaign: nine wins in nine matches, scoring 33 goals, with Heitor as the top scorer with 18 goals. In 1927, Palestra achieved its first Paulista Championship back-to-back titles. Additionally, the team won the Taça Competência in 1927 and 1928 and the Rio–São Paulo State Champions Trophy in 1926 against São Cristóvão.

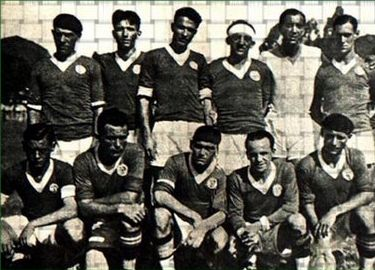
Palestra Itália in 1932

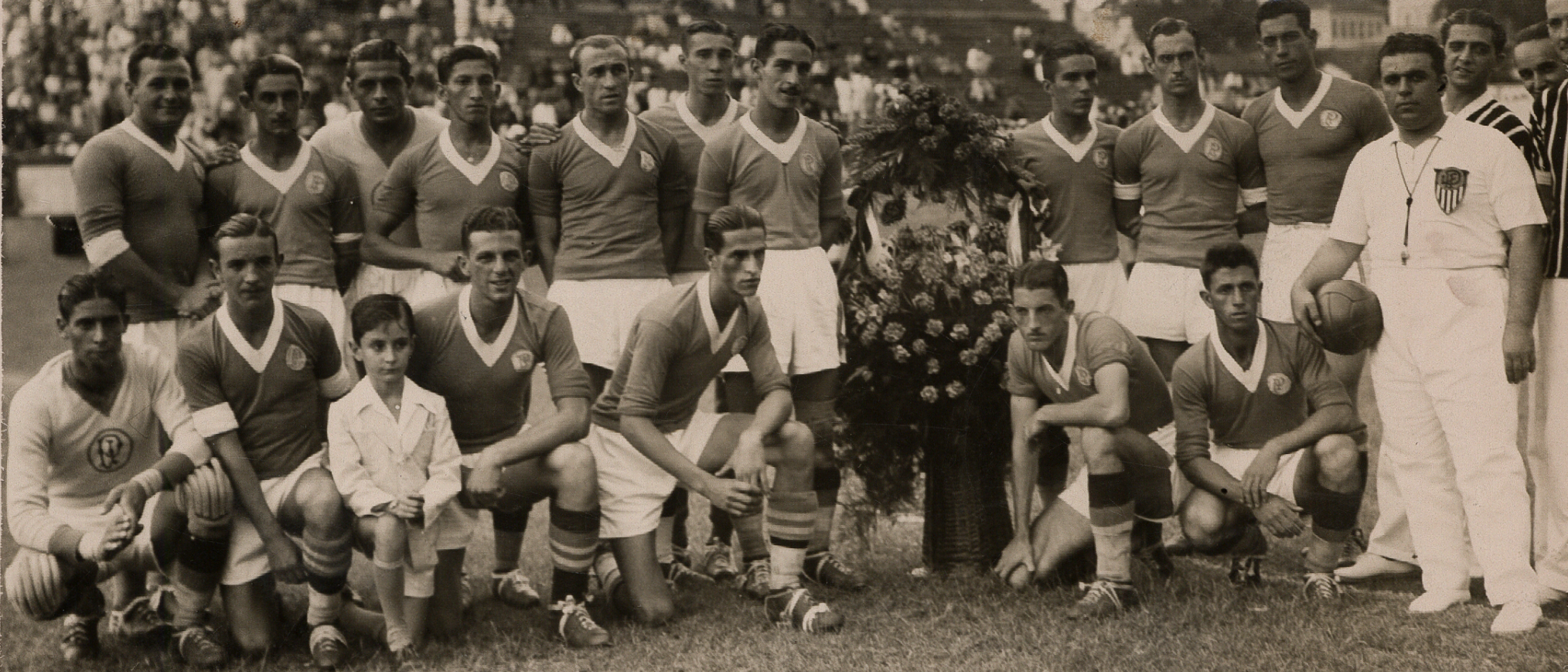
Palestra Itália in 1933

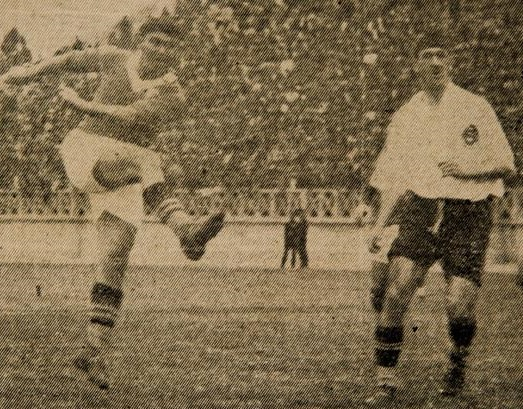
Romeu Pellicciari scoring one of his four goals in Palmeiras' 8–0 thrashing of Corinthians in 1933

The early 1930s were marked by the 1932 Revolution, which halted the championship for four months, with clubs offering their facilities as barracks and infirmaries for Paulista troops. In football, this period saw the advent of professionalism and Palestra's dominance not only in São Paulo but across Brazil.

In 1932, Palestra Italia won the Paulista Championship undefeated, achieving the competition's most remarkable campaign: 11 matches, 11 wins, 48 goals scored, and only 8 conceded. The following year, the club celebrated a double triumph, securing back-to-back Paulista titles and the inaugural Torneio Rio–São Paulo.

In 1933, the club reinaugurated the Palestra Itália Stadium, then São Paulo's largest and one of the few in Brazil built with reinforced concrete. That year also saw a historic 8–0 rout of archrival Corinthians. The match, valid for both the Paulista Championship and the 1933 Torneio Rio–São Paulo, featured four goals by Romeu Pellicciari, one by Gabardo, and three by Imparato, marking the heaviest defeat in Corinthians' history. The defeat's impact on Corinthians was so profound that it led to the resignation of their president, Alfredo Schurig, and prompted Corinthians fans to set fire to their own club's headquarters.

The year 1933, the first of professional football in Brazil, concluded with Palestra Italia as back-to-back Paulista champions and the inaugural Torneio Rio–São Paulo champions.

In 1934, the club achieved a Paulista Championship three-peat. In 1935 and 1936, Palestra Italia gained international recognition, playing friendlies against Boca Juniors, Estudiantes, Huracán, and Vélez from Argentina, as well as Espanyol from Barcelona.

In 1940, Palestra Italia had the honor of inaugurating the Pacaembu Stadium, defeating Coritiba 6–2 in the opening match and beating Corinthians 2–1 the following Sunday, becoming the champion of the Taça Cidade de São Paulo, the first champion of the Pacaembu Stadium. The year 1941 marked the debut of the club's greatest idol of the 1940s, goalkeeper Oberdan Cattani, alongside Waldemar Fiúme; Oberdan guarded Palestra's goal for fifteen years.

== Palestra becomes Palmeiras ==
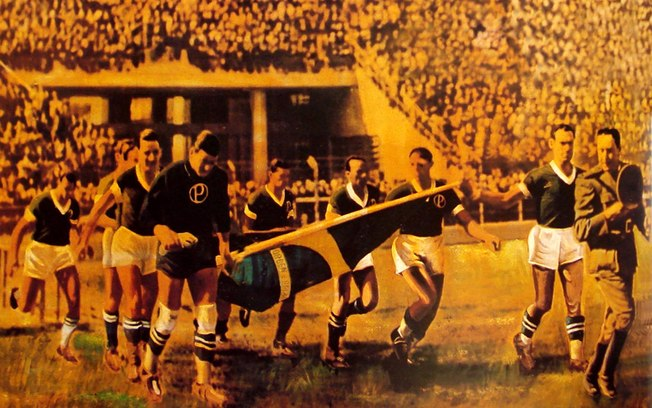
Painting depicting the Heroic Sprint of 1942

Palestra Itália was forced to change its name during World War II. After maintaining neutrality for the first three years of the conflict, on January 28, 1942, Brazil severed diplomatic relations with the Axis powers (Germany, Italy, and Japan), signaling the stance it would formalize on August 31 of that year, when it declared war on these nations, aligning with the Allies (United States, England, France, and others).

On March 17, 1942, a board meeting deliberated on changing the club's name, selecting Sociedade Esportiva Palestra de São Paulo. The announcement sent to the press and members stated: The Executive Council and Executive Board, pending confirmation by the Deliberative Council, which will meet shortly, have resolved that the society shall henceforth be named 'Sociedade Esportiva Palestra de São Paulo'.

However, this change had little effect, as the press and fans continued to use only "Palestra," and the club's colors, referencing Italy, remained unchanged.

The situation escalated with a decree-law on June 17, 1942, requiring sports organizations with foreign names to change their designations. On August 31, the Brazilian government formally declared war on the Axis powers.

Two weeks later, on the night of September 14, 1942, Palestra's board convened an extraordinary session to address the military's demand for a complete name change, despite "Palestra" being a Greek word meaning "gymnasium." After hours of debate and resistance, and rejecting names like Piratininga and Paulista, the board settled on Sociedade Esportiva Palmeiras, partly to preserve the letter P in the club's emblems and partly to honor the Associação Atlética das Palmeiras, a now-defunct club that had maintained a strong relationship with Palestra Itália and provided crucial support in disputes with Paulista football authorities.

The red color was removed, leaving only green and white, and the emblem's letter I was eliminated, retaining only the P on a green background. Meeting the authorities' requirements, Palmeiras took the field the following Sunday to compete for the championship title against São Paulo, introducing two notable changes.

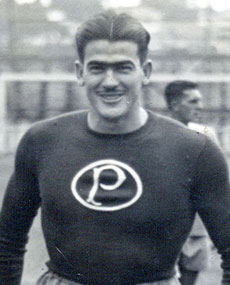
Oberdan Cattani, legendary Palmeiras goalkeeper, who participated in the Heroic Sprint

=== The Heroic Sprint ===
To counter planned protests and jeers from rival fans, the "imposing green-and-white" team was led onto the field by its vice-president, Army Captain Adalberto Mendes, carrying a Brazilian flag. After some hesitation and silence, the stadium gave the players a standing ovation, confining rivalry to the pitch. Another change, noticed only years later, was the switch in the goalkeepers' jerseys, which had been white since 1914 and now became blue, a subtle nod to the club's Italian roots, referencing the Italian national team's colors, which honor the House of Savoy.

The match took place on September 20, 1942, Palmeiras entered the field for the first time with the name that is still known today. To avoid the "boos" that were promised by their rivals, the team appeared on the Pacaembu Stadium lawn with a Brazilian flag, carried by the then 2nd vice-president of the club, Adalberto Mendes, who was captain of the Brazilian Army. The initiative and the moving image, later called "Arrancada Heroica" (Heroic Sprint), was applauded by the fans present and helped to ease the pressure on the alviverde team. The game with São Paulo was tense and violent, with Palmeiras winning 3–1, and the Tricolores refusing to play the rest of the second half, an act done as a form of response and protest against refereeing, when the referee awarded a penalty committed by Virgílio in Og Moreira. With the score and the São Paulo side protest, Palmeiras won the first tournament with the new name. With the defeat, São Paulo finished third, behind Corinthians, runner-up.

== The dawn of a new era ==
=== 1943–1950 ===
In 1944, the Verdão (Big Green) won the Paulista Championship once again. In 1947, alongside another title, the year was marked by the rise of a young coach who would make history in Brazilian football, Osvaldo Brandão. In 1949, Palmeiras traveled to Europe for the first time, competing in a tournament in Spain against Barcelona (1–1 draw) and Kjøbenhavns Boldklub (4–3 loss), finishing third. In 1950, dubbed the Holy Year, Palmeiras claimed another title against São Paulo in a match known as the mud game. The year 1950 was called the Holy Year due to the 400th anniversary of Saint John of God's death and a Eucharistic Congress held in the nation's capital; the "mud game" moniker stemmed from the muddy Pacaembu pitch during the final match.

=== The Copa Rio triumph ===
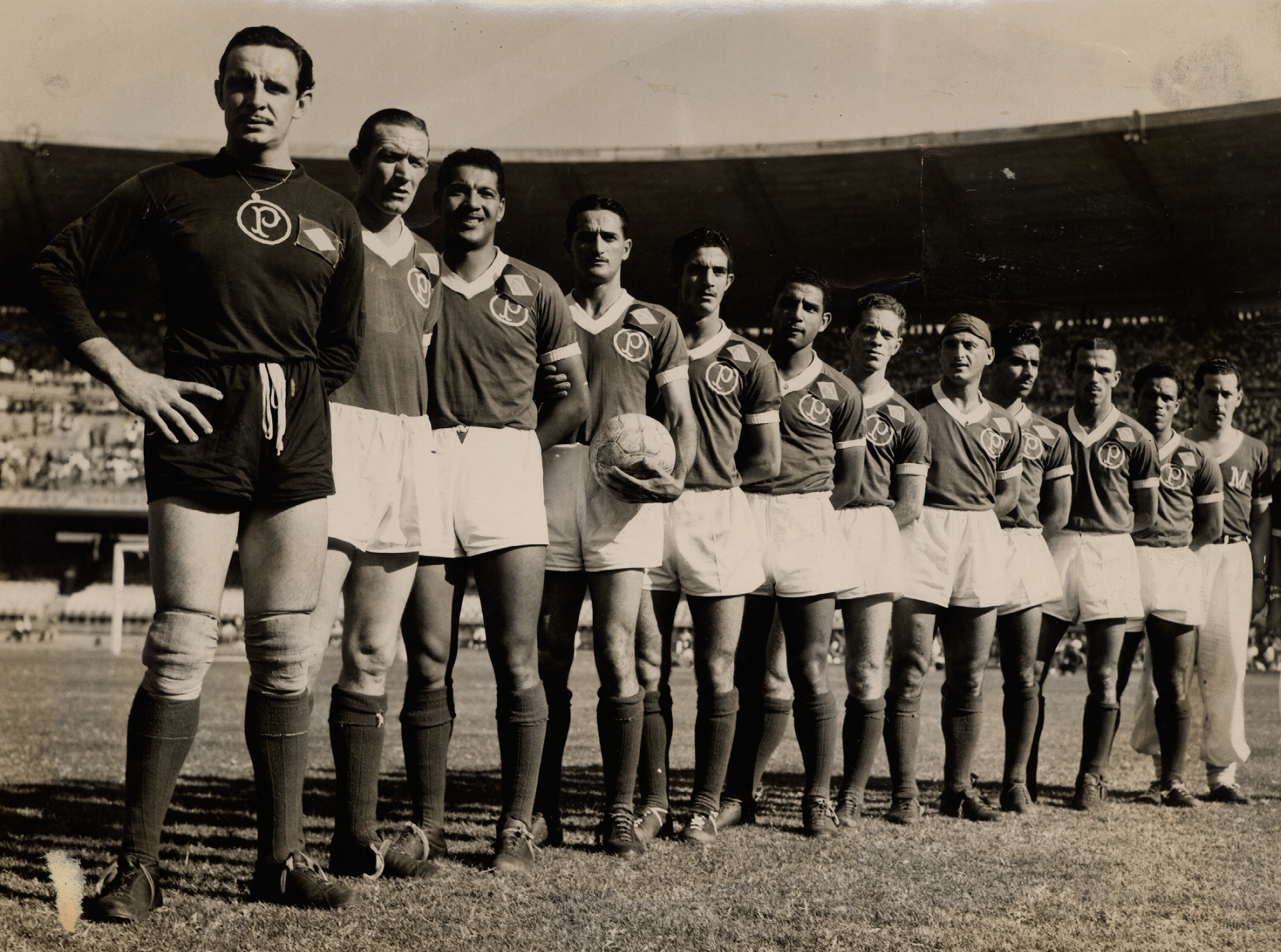
Palmeiras team lined up before the grand final against Juventus in 1951 at the Maracanã Stadium

In 1951, the Verdão won the Copa Rio against Juventus of Turin. The decisive match, held on July 22, 1951, at the Maracanã Stadium, ended in a 2–2 draw, following Palmeiras' 1–0 victory in the first leg. To underscore the title's significance, the champion team paraded in an open car through the city of Rio de Janeiro. Another notable fact was the selection of Jair da Rosa Pinto as the tournament's best player.

The team was welcomed back in São Paulo at the Roosevelt train station by thousands of fans. The traditional Brazilian sports newspaper A Gazeta Esportiva headlined its front page:

Palmeiras World Champion!

— A Gazeta Esportiva

Radio Panamericana, now Radio Jovem Pan, also declared Palmeiras the World Champion. The competition was the first attempt to organize a global championship, predating the Copa Libertadores and the Champions League. In its inaugural edition, FIFA closely oversaw the tournament, appointing referees and co-organizing it with the CBD under the leadership of FIFA's secretary-general and vice-president, Ottorino Barassi, who attended the final, presenting medals and the trophy.

==== FIFA recognizes the 1951 title as a world championship ====
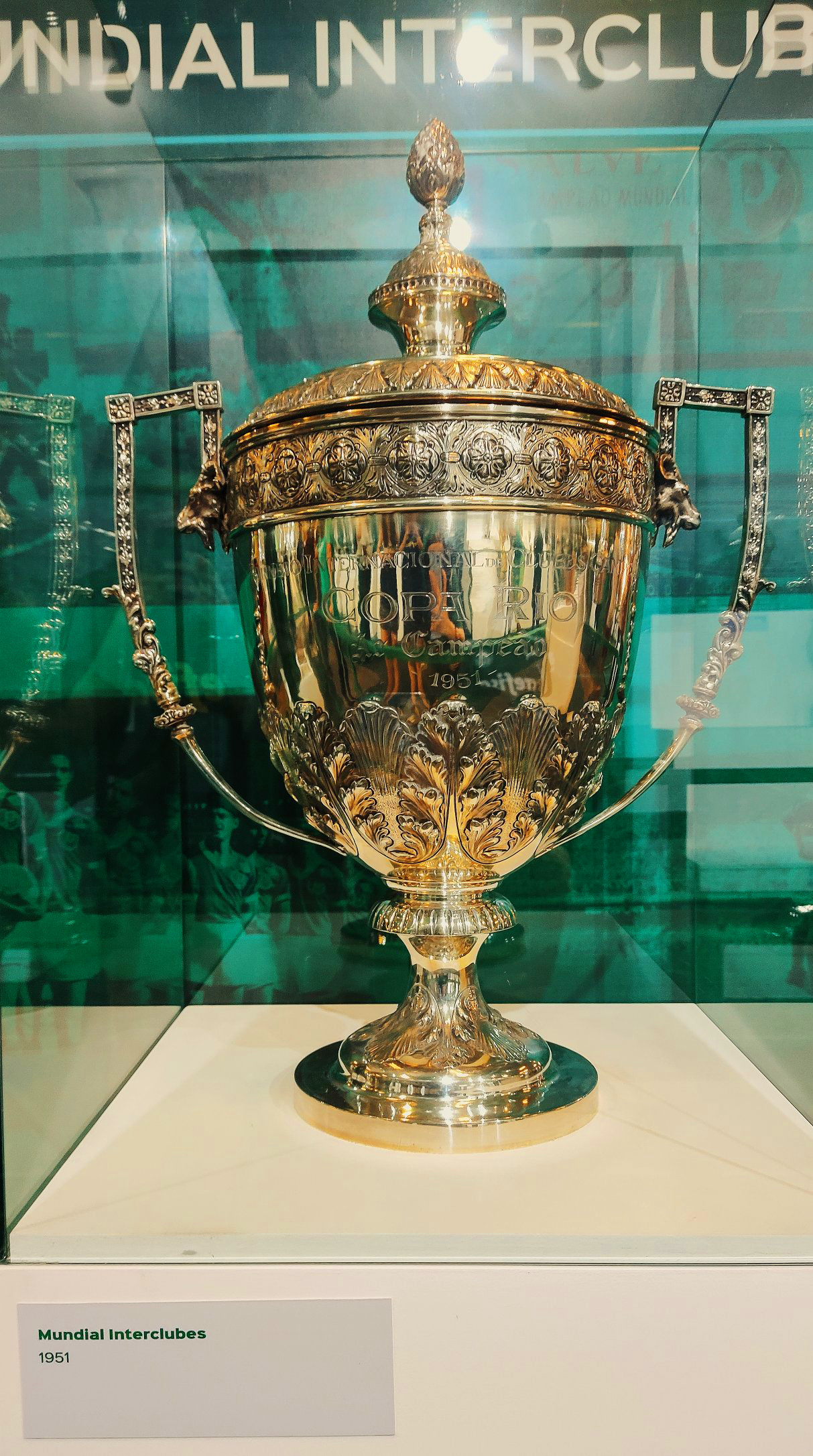
Copa Rio trophy of 1951

Since 2001, Palmeiras' leadership worked to have the 1951 Copa Rio recognized as the first Club World Championship. The São Paulo club compiled a dossier to lobby FIFA for recognition.

In late March 2007, Palmeiras' officials presented a fax signed by then-FIFA secretary-general Urs Linsi, affirming that the first Copa Rio was the inaugural Club World Championship. The club celebrated the recognition and planned festivities to mark the Copa Rio's official world championship status.

Following the decision's publicity, other Brazilian clubs, such as Fluminense (Copa Rio 1952) and Santos (1968 Intercontinental Recopa), requested similar "world champion" recognition from FIFA.

Fearing a wave of similar requests from clubs worldwide, FIFA backtracked on the Copa Rio 1951 decision, declining to confirm it as the first club world championship and announcing that its executive committee would decide the matter.

On April 26, 2007, the newspaper O Estado de S. Paulo reported on its website that FIFA cautioned that a final decision on recognizing the 1951 Copa Rio as a world championship would only be made after a meeting on May 27. "There is no formal decision yet," said Andreas Herren, FIFA's spokesperson in Zurich. "The issue was discussed internally by FIFA's administration. However, the conclusion was that, due to its importance and complexity, it must be brought to the executive committee," the spokesperson stated.

In December 2007, FIFA endorsed Corinthians, winners of the 2000 FIFA Club World Championship, as the first officially recognized world champion, (Note: "Regarding the history of the FIFA Club World Championship and previous intercontinental competitions, such as the Copa Rio of the 1950s, the Executive Committee reaffirms the view that the first edition of the competition was held in 2000 in Brazil, where Corinthians was the true first FIFA Club World Champion. Other tournaments are not considered official FIFA events." – FIFA (quoted from a Brazilian internet portal IG news article on December 15, 2007: FIFA decides: the first Club World Championship was in 2000; Intercontinental and Copa Rio are ignored)) also ruling that the Intercontinental Cups contested between the champions of the Copa Libertadores and the European Cup were not recognized by the global football authority. Palmeiras' leadership did not appeal FIFA's decision.

In August 2014, FIFA president Joseph Blatter stated that the organization would recognize the 1951 competition as a Club World Championship. The head of the governing body emphasized that the Copa Rio would not be equated with FIFA's World Championships but that Palmeiras would receive a certificate acknowledging the Copa Rio's significance as the first global competition. On November 21, 2014, FIFA sent a meeting minute to the Ministry of Sport, stating that Palmeiras is the first club world champion, though it distinguished the Copa Rio from tournaments organized by FIFA starting in 2000.

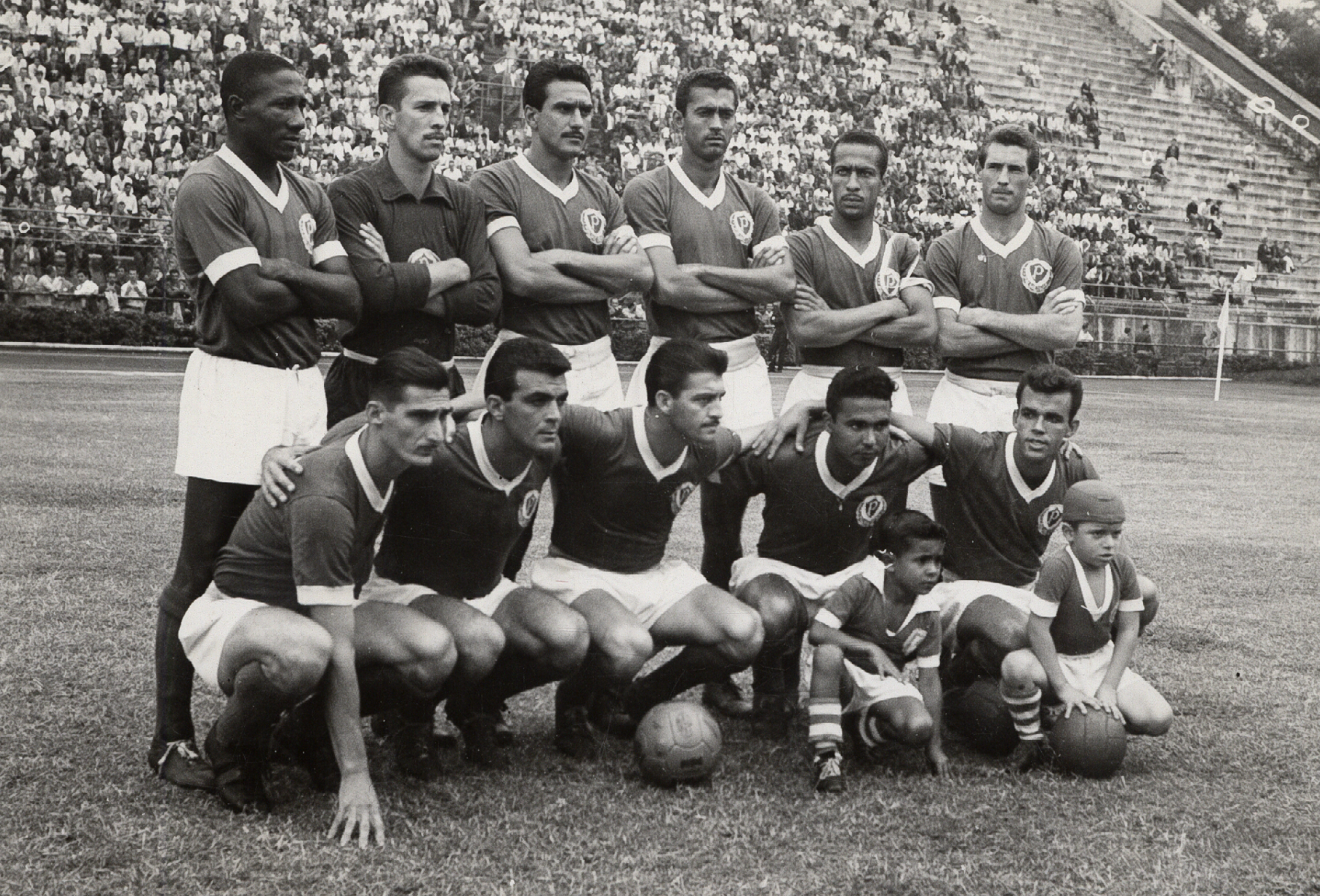
Palmeiras team in 1960

In June 2025, with the holding of the extended edition of the FIFA Club World Cup with 32 participants, the entity once again denied the equivalence of the competition with the tournament of its own organization. In Brazil, Palmeiras and Fluminense, which won the 1952 edition, treat the importance of the Copa Rio as that of an official worldwide tournament.

==== After the Copa Rio – 1951–1959 ====
In the same year, 1951, Palmeiras won the Torneio Rio–São Paulo. From 1952 to 1958, Palmeiras did not win any titles. In 1959, Palmeiras reclaimed the Paulista Championship, defeating Santos of Pelé in the final match. The press dubbed this championship the Supercampeonato Paulista, due to the balance and strength of both squads. Santos won the first round, while Palmeiras took the second; the title was decided in three matches—two draws and a 2–1 Palmeiras victory—a title considered historic to this day. That same year, the emblem changed again, with the P now encircled by the word "Palmeiras," a design still in use today.

=== 1960s – The first "football academy" ===
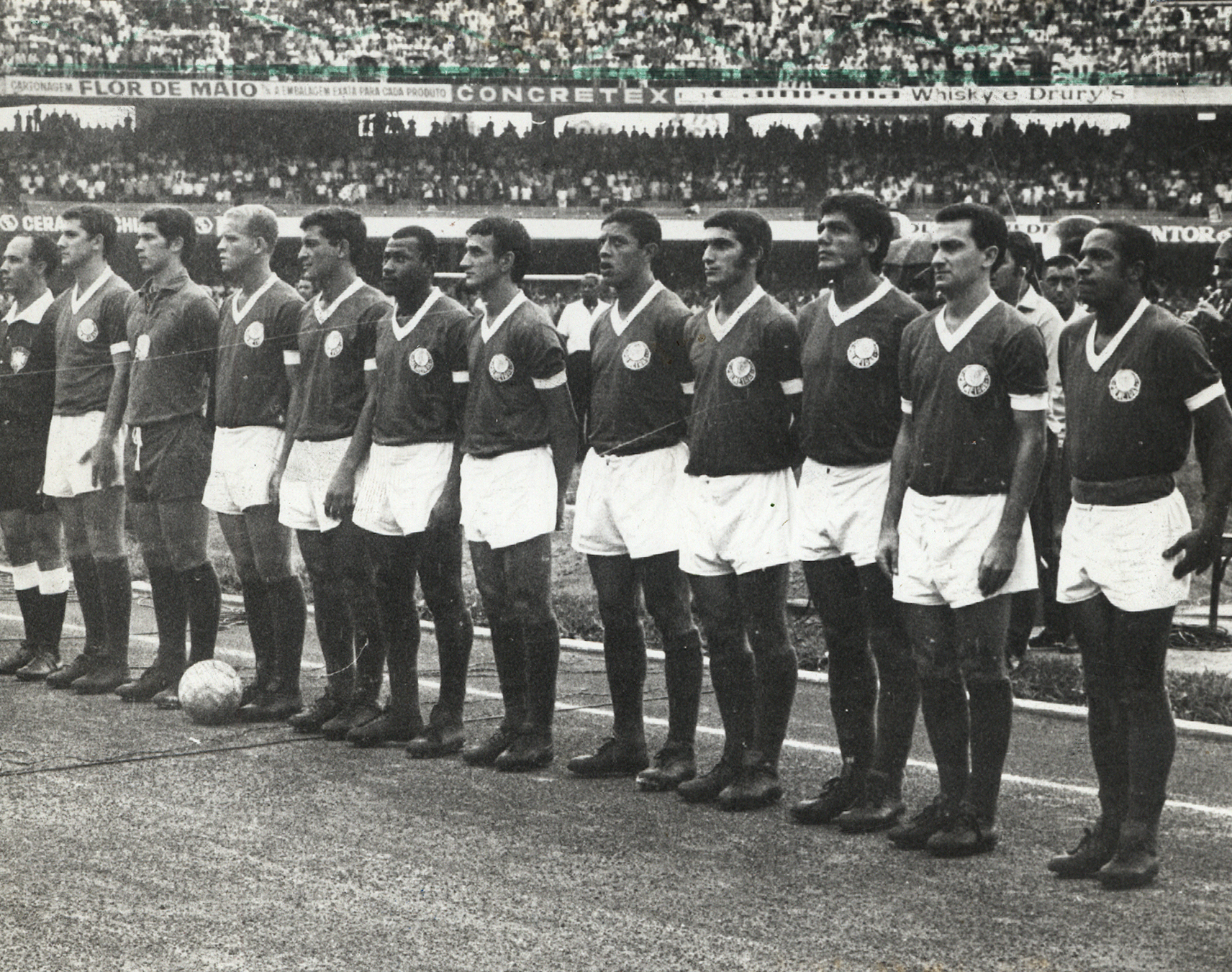
Palmeiras team in 1969

The 1960s began with Palmeiras as the only São Paulo team to rival Santos of Pelé. In 1960, Palmeiras won its first national title, the Taça Brasil (the Brazilian Championship of the era), thrashing Fortaleza 8–2. This historic victory earned Palmeiras the right to compete in the Copa Libertadores the following year. In 1961, in its first Libertadores appearance, Palmeiras reached the final against Peñarol of Uruguay, losing the title with one defeat and one draw. In 1963, Palmeiras won the Paulista Championship again, with standout performances from attacker Julinho Botelho.

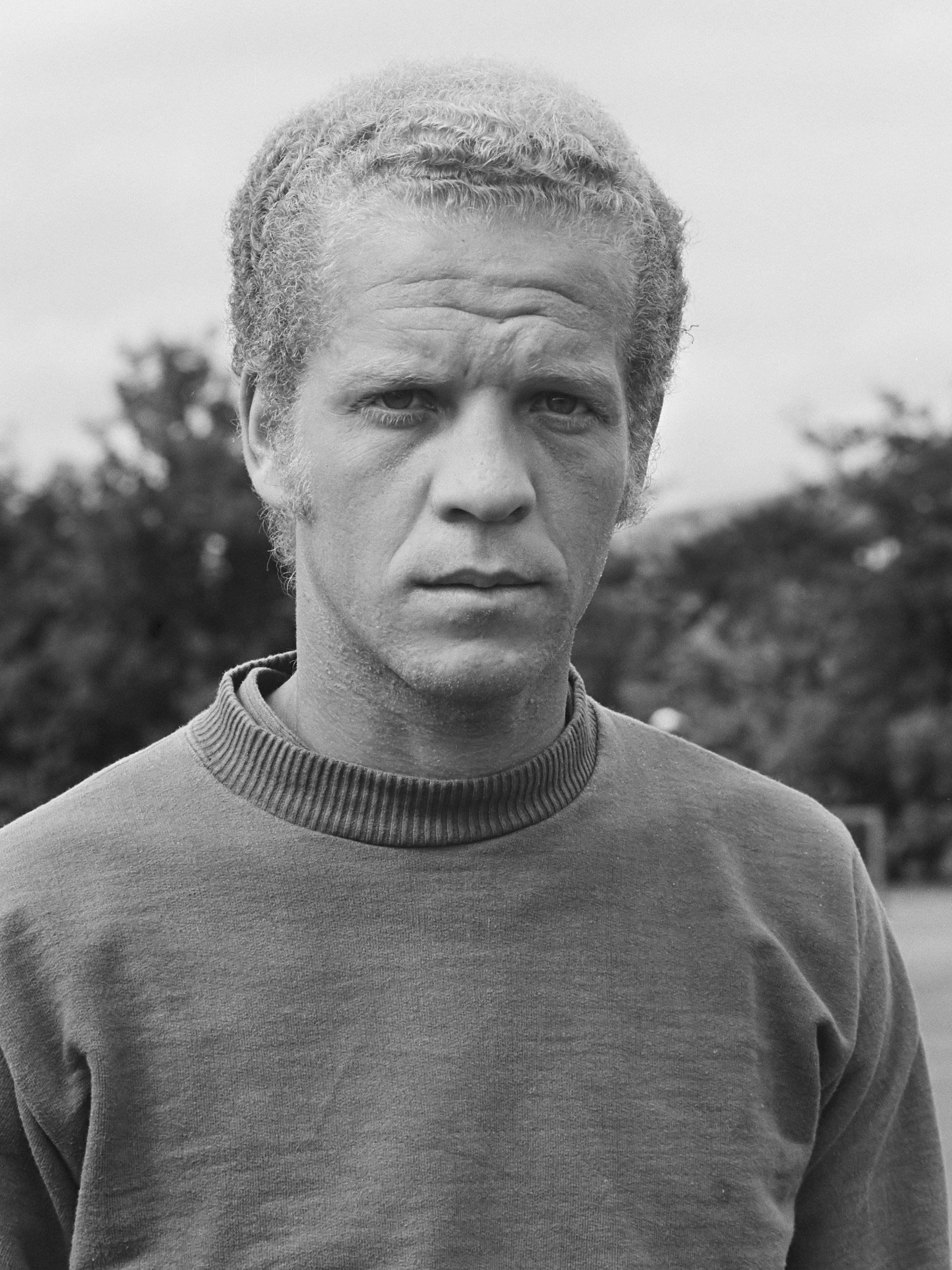
Ademir da Guia

The year 1965 was historic for Palmeiras. On July 11, it won the Rio de Janeiro IV Centenary Tournament against Peñarol. On September 7, at the Governador Magalhães Pinto Stadium in Belo Horizonte, Palmeiras played in the Brazilian national team's jersey against Uruguay, winning 3–0 with goals from Julinho Botelho, who retired at season's end, Rinaldo, and Tupãzinho. Additionally, Palmeiras won the Torneio Rio–São Paulo. In 1966, Palmeiras again won the Paulista Championship, defeating Pelé's Santos.

The following year was one of the decade's best for Palmeiras, as the Verdão won the Taça Brasil and the newly created Torneio Roberto Gomes Pedrosa, known as the Robertão, another national competition. In 1968, Palmeiras reached the Libertadores final again, losing to Estudiantes of Argentina. The decade closed as it began, with title wins: the Robertão (national title) and the prestigious Ramón de Carranza Trophy in Spain.

=== 1970s – The second "football academy" ===
The 1970s began, marking one of Palmeiras' most successful decades. Led by Leão, Luís Pereira, Dudu, Ademir da Guia, and others, Palmeiras built a team that dominated the national scene in the decade's first half. In 1971, attacker Leivinha, then at Portuguesa, was signed after lengthy negotiations, becoming one of the club's top scorers with 105 goals.

The year 1972 was historic, as Palmeiras won all five competitions it entered, including the Paulista Championship—the last undefeated Paulista champion to date—and the Brazilian Championship, triumphing over São Paulo and Botafogo, respectively. The following year brought a Brazilian Championship back-to-back title against São Paulo, with the finals also featuring strong teams like Cruzeiro and Internacional.

In 1974, the Verdão won one of its most celebrated titles. In a final against Corinthians, which was enduring a 20-year title drought, Palmeiras won 1–0 with a goal by Ronaldo. This victory caused significant turmoil for their rival, leading to Corinthians' disarray and forcing their then-president Vicente Matheus to negotiate the transfer of one of Corinthians' greatest players, Roberto Rivellino.

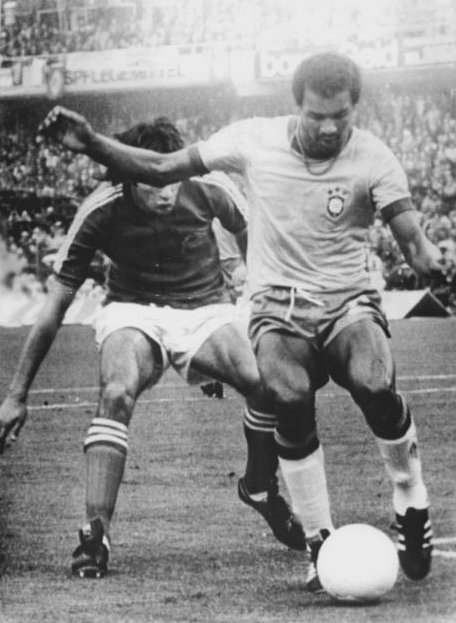
Luís Pereira, playing for the Brazilian national team, at the 1974 World Cup

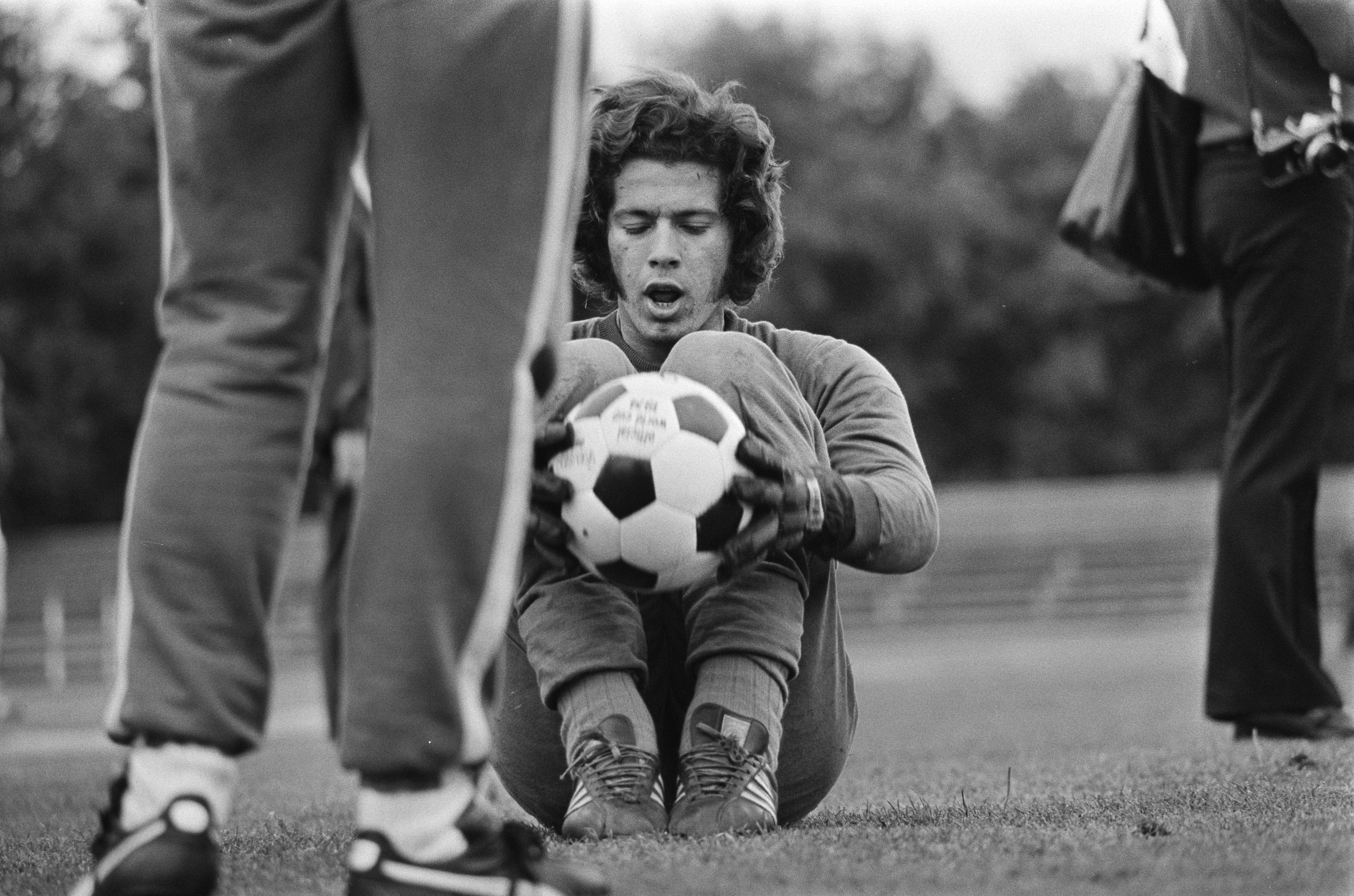
Leão

=== Final title of the "Ademir Generation" and the start of a drought ===
In 1976, Palmeiras won another Paulista Championship, the last of the Ademir da Guia generation, considered the club's greatest player, nicknamed the "Divino." He retired the following year after 16 years of glory. This title featured Dudu, and the final match remains the record holder for the highest attendance at Palestra Itália, with over 40,000 spectators. In 1977, Ademir retired after 16 years of triumphs with Palmeiras, notably relinquishing his guaranteed starting position in his final games. In 1978, Palmeiras reached the Brazilian Championship final, led by players like Jorge Mendonça, but lost to Guarani, featuring the young striker Careca. In 1979, despite strong campaigns in both the Paulista and Brazilian Championships under Telê Santana, the team failed to win titles, earning the nickname "Marvelous Verdão." Notably, Vicente Matheus secured a postponement of the Paulista Championship finals through administrative maneuvers, which many believe disadvantaged Palmeiras. From 1980 to 1985, Palmeiras won no historically significant titles, marking the worst phase in the club's history. In 1981, the Verdão struggled in the Paulista Championship and started the year in the Taça Prata (then the national second division), but performed well, finishing first in its group and earning promotion to the Taça Ouro per the regulations. In 1982, it faltered again in the Paulista and failed to secure a good position in the Taça Prata, missing promotion to the Taça Ouro. In 1985, a historic match saw Palmeiras and São Paulo draw 4–4 at the Pacaembu Stadium, notable for the unusual scoreline and two missed penalties, one for each side. In 1986, the team reached the Paulista Championship final but was defeated by the surprising Internacional de Limeira; in the same tournament, Palmeiras thrashed archrival Corinthians 5–1. In 1987, young goalkeeper Zetti made history by going 1,239 minutes without conceding a goal for the Verdão. In 1989, under coach Leão, the team won the Taça dos Invictos (23 matches unbeaten).

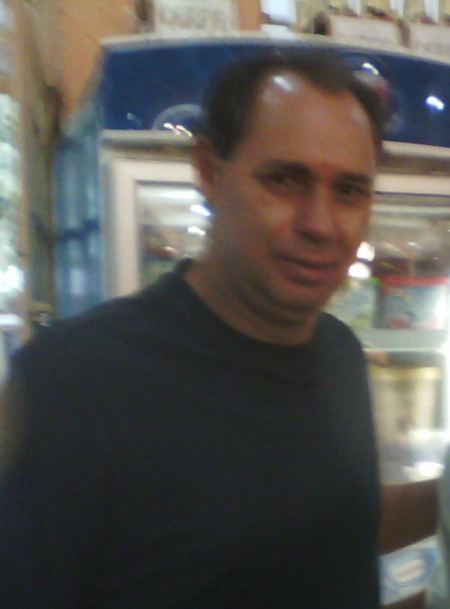
Evair, hero of the 1993 title

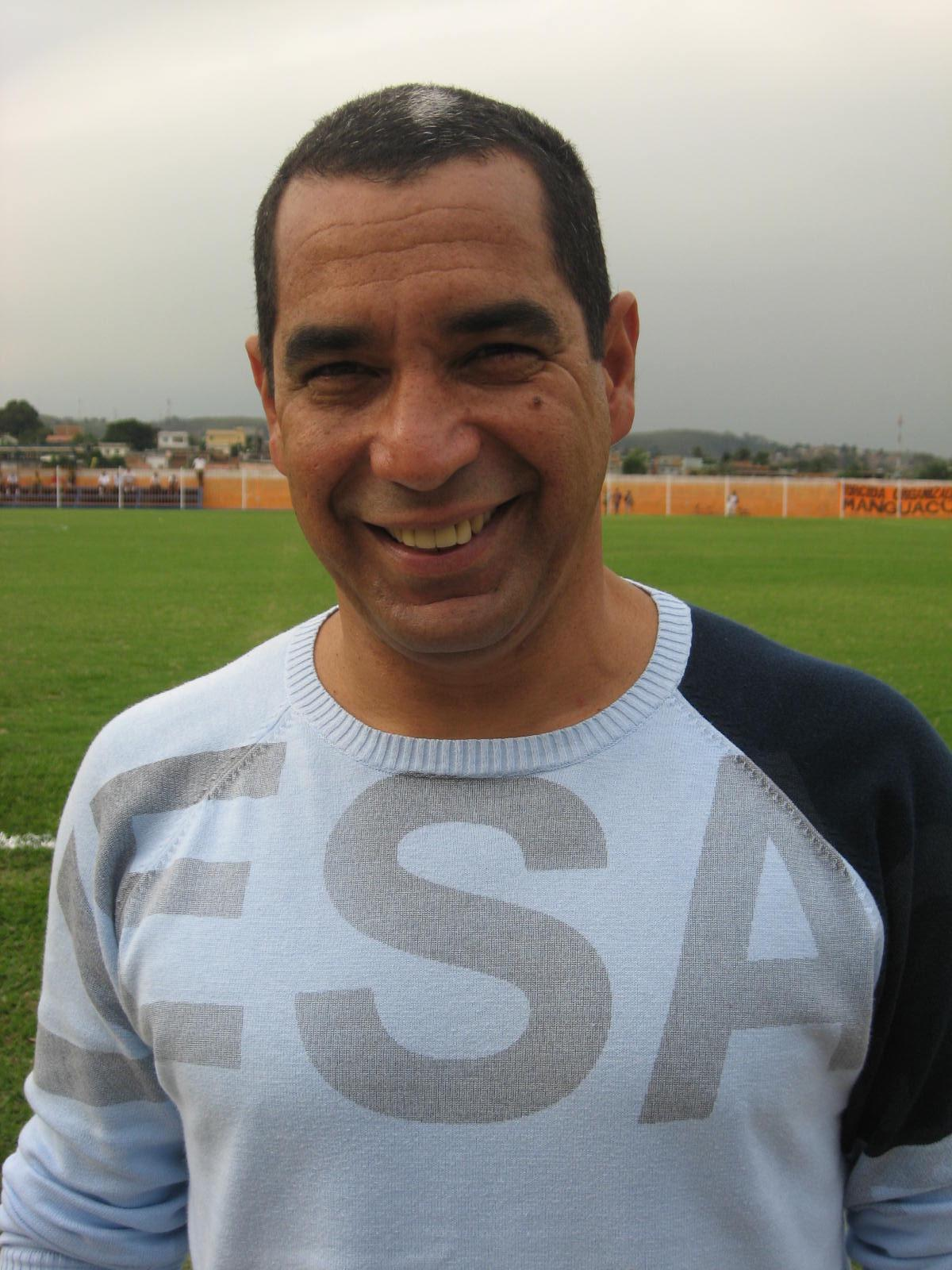
Zinho, a key player on June 12, 1993

=== 1992–2000, the Parmalat era ===
At the start of the 1990s, Palmeiras remained without titles, but in April 1992, the board signed an unprecedented partnership with Parmalat to manage football operations, announcing sweeping changes, including a new jersey with white stripes and a lighter green hue. Initially, key players like midfielder Zinho and full-back Mazinho were signed, joining existing talents such as midfielder César Sampaio and striker Evair. With the team still forming and adapting to the new era, Palmeiras finished as runner-up in the 1992 Paulista Championship. Heading into 1993, more stars were acquired, including defender Antônio Carlos, alongside emerging talents who would bring great joy to Palmeiras fans, such as left-back Roberto Carlos and strikers Edmundo and Edílson. With Parmalat's bold strategy of making expensive signings for the time, Palmeiras was poised to return to its winning ways.

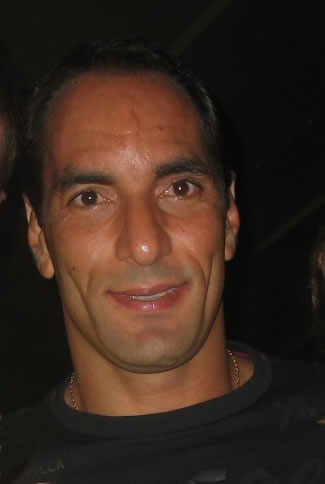
Edmundo, one of the idols of the early Parmalat Era

==== 1993 – Breaking the drought against the biggest rival ====
The year 1993 was historic for Sociedade Esportiva Palmeiras. The Verdão won the Paulista Championship and the Torneio Rio–São Paulo against Corinthians, 27 years after its last participation, using a reserve team as the starters were with the national team. Earlier, in the Paulista final on June 12, Palmeiras, coached by Vanderlei Luxemburgo, defeated Corinthians, ending a 16-year title drought. The match was held at Morumbi Stadium. Per the regulations, Palmeiras needed to win the second leg to force extra time, as Corinthians had won the first leg 1–0 with a goal by Viola, the tournament's top scorer, who mimicked a pig in a clear taunt to Palmeiras fans. In the second leg, Luxemburgo used Viola's celebration to further motivate his players. Palmeiras took the lead in the first half when, after a pass from striker Evair, midfielder Zinho scored with a fine right-footed shot. In the second half, Mazinho, then playing as a right-back, made a great run down the left and crossed for Evair to extend the lead. Shortly after, midfielder Daniel Frasson crossed from the left to Evair, whose shot hit the post, but Edílson scored on the rebound. With this score, Palmeiras needed only a draw in extra time, but Evair sealed the title with a penalty goal, breaking the drought in one of the most memorable Derby Paulista matches, ending 4–0. In the Brazilian Championship final, after an excellent first phase, Palmeiras easily defeated Vitória, which had eliminated Corinthians in a decisive match. In the first leg in Salvador, Palmeiras won 1–0 with a goal by Edílson. In the second leg at Morumbi Stadium, they beat Vitória 2–0 with goals from Evair and Edmundo, securing their third title in the modern Brazilian Championship era (since 1971).

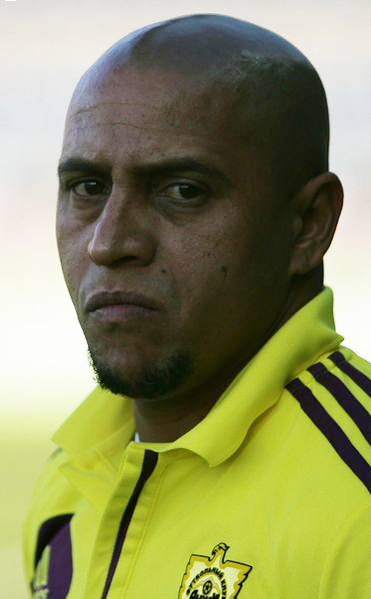
Roberto Carlos

==== 1994 – Back-to-back state and national titles ====
In 1994, Palmeiras again won both the Paulista and Brazilian Championships. In the Paulista Championship, played on a points system, Palmeiras finished six points ahead of the runner-up, despite the absence of Edmundo, suspended for indiscipline by coach Luxemburgo. Striker Evair, in top form, was the tournament's top scorer. In the Brazilian Championship, Palmeiras again defeated Corinthians—the first Brazilian Championship final between the two rivals. A standout in the campaign was Rivaldo, who scored in every match from the semi-finals against Guarani. In the first leg of the final against Corinthians, with Edmundo reinstated, Palmeiras won 3–1. The second leg ended 1–1, securing another title for the green-and-white. The year 1994 also marked Palmeiras' return to the Copa Libertadores. Eliminated by São Paulo in the round of 16, Palmeiras' campaign was highlighted by a historic 6–1 thrashing of Boca Juniors in the first phase at Palestra Itália Stadium.

==== 1995 – An atypical year ====
In 1995, Corinthians ended their string of final losses to Palmeiras, winning that year's Paulista Championship against their archrival, who no longer had Luxemburgo as coach or many players from the 1993 and 1994 campaigns. Three days earlier, in the Libertadores, Palmeiras, under coach Carlos Alberto Silva, was eliminated by Grêmio, coached by Luiz Felipe Scolari, in the quarterfinals. The team left the field to applause from fans after a near-historic performance, almost overturning a 5–0 loss in Porto Alegre, where Rivaldo was sent off. In São Paulo, Palmeiras routed Grêmio 5–1 but was eliminated on goal difference.

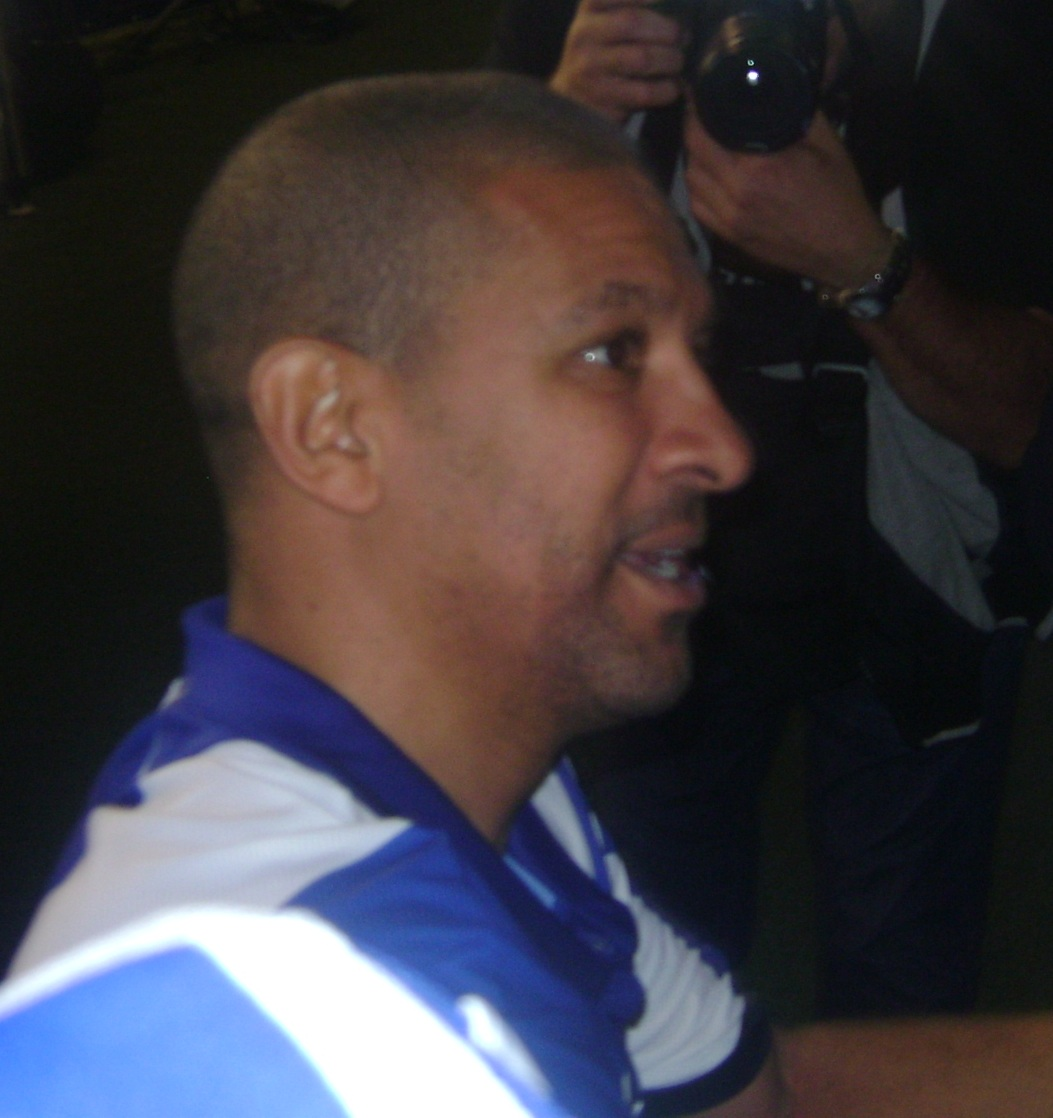
Djalminha

==== The "Super Verdão" of 1996 ====
In 1996, after another squad overhaul and again led by Vanderlei Luxemburgo, Palmeiras won the Paulista Championship in spectacular fashion. The green-and-white secured the title with the best campaign of any team in the professional era of the competition. They earned 83 out of 90 possible points, a 92.2% point efficiency, scoring 102 goals in 30 matches. This record remains unmatched in the competition. The historic 1996 team featured stars like goalkeeper Velloso, Djalminha, Luisão, Rivaldo, Cafu, left-back Júnior, Müller, and others. That same year, Palmeiras reached the Copa do Brasil final for the first time but lost to Cruzeiro of Marcelo Ramos.

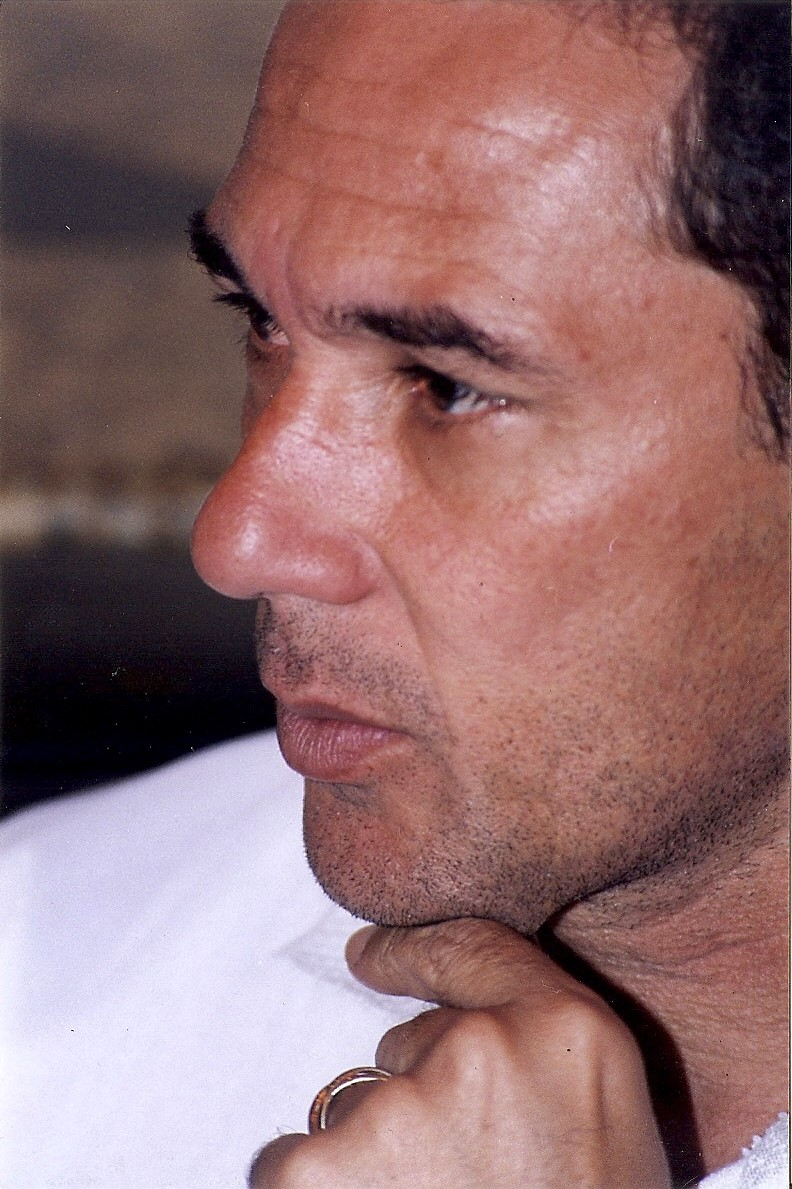
Vanderlei Luxemburgo

In the Brazilian Championship, the Verdão finished third in the first phase, one point behind leader Cruzeiro and behind Guarani on goal difference. Fate pitted Palmeiras against Felipão's Grêmio in the quarterfinals. Emotionally unsettled, Palmeiras lost 3–1 in the south, with defender Cléber and midfielder Leandro Ávila sent off. In the return leg at Morumbi, Palmeiras won 1–0 with a goal by Elivélton, but a goal by Fernando Diniz, which would have secured qualification, was wrongly disallowed. The year ended with the dismantling of the Paulista champion squad and Luxemburgo's departure to Santos for a R$100,000 salary.

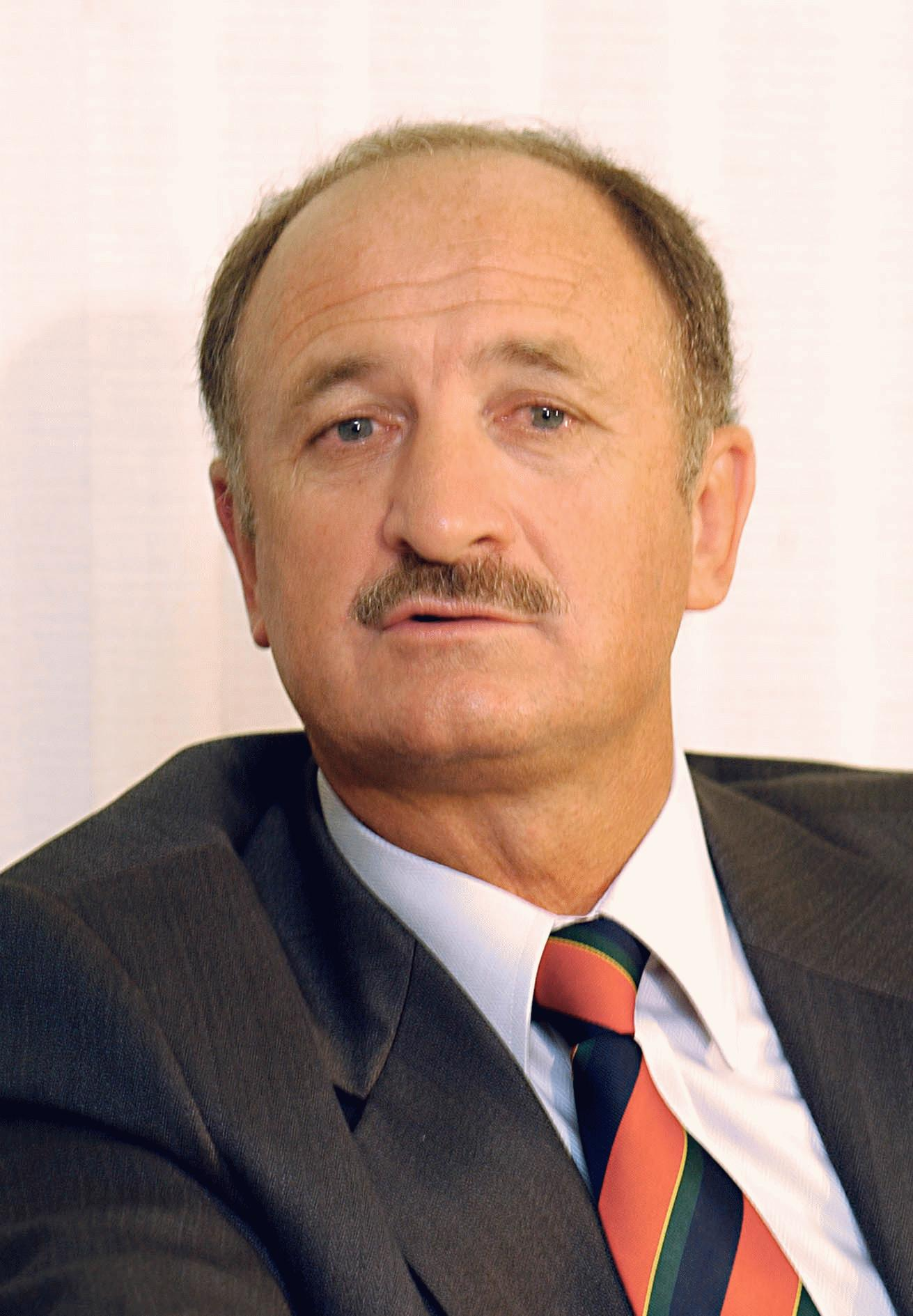
Luiz Felipe Scolari

==== 1997–1998 – Felipão's arrival, Copa do Brasil, and Mercosur ====
In 1997, Palmeiras started the year inconsistently. Under Márcio Araújo, the team was thrashed 5–2 by Corinthians at Morumbi but led the Paulista Championship's first phase with 48 points in 23 matches. However, in the finals, they performed poorly, losing all matches and suffering heavy defeats to Santos and São Paulo. In the Copa do Brasil, another disappointing end came after eliminating River-PI, Coritiba, and Ceará, only to be dominated by Flamengo in the semi-finals, losing both legs with Sávio scoring in each. Fan discontent with Araújo became untenable, and Parmalat, eyeing the Libertadores—a major fan aspiration—hired Luiz Felipe Scolari.

Under Felipão, the club overhauled much of the squad. Djalminha and Cafu were sold to Europe, and players recommended by Scolari arrived: midfielders Alex and Zinho, striker Oséas, and attacker Euller. The club reached the Brazilian Championship final against Vasco da Gama. Despite two 0–0 draws, Palmeiras lost the title due to Vasco's better first-phase campaign. In 1998, Palmeiras won the Copa do Brasil for the first time, avenging their loss to Cruzeiro. The title was secured in the penultimate minute of the Morumbi final, with a near-impossible-angle goal by Oséas. Cruzeiro eliminated Felipão's team in the Brazilian Championship quarterfinals, but in another act of revenge, Palmeiras won the inaugural Copa Mercosur against Cruzeiro, with a decisive goal by Arce.

==== The 1999 Copa Libertadores triumph ====
1999 is a memorable year in the history of Sociedade Esportiva Palmeiras. In a historic campaign, Felipão's Verdão won the Copa Libertadores on penalties against Deportivo Cali at Palestra Itália, with goalkeeper Marcos named the tournament's best player. Palmeiras eliminated teams like Vasco (the previous year's champion), Corinthians, and River Plate, among others. The team's captain was César Sampaio. Another standout was Paulo Nunes, notable for his goals, assists, and humorous, sometimes provocative celebrations. The squad also included right-back Arce, left-back Júnior, defenders Júnior Baiano and Roque Júnior, midfielder Rogério, midfielders Alex and Zinho, and striker Oséas. Strikers Evair and Euller, defender Cléber, and midfielder Galeano also played key roles. The year 1999 also featured one of Palmeiras' most thrilling matches, in the Copa do Brasil. A 4–2 comeback victory in the final minutes eliminated Flamengo, advancing Palmeiras to the semi-finals, where they were defeated by Botafogo on penalties.

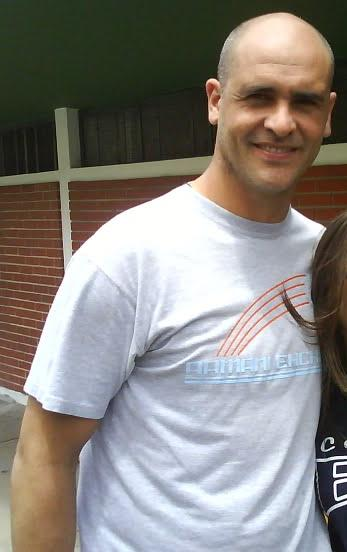
Marcos, a Palmeiras idol

==== Loss of the world title ====
In November 1999, Palmeiras finished as runner-up in the Intercontinental Cup, losing 1–0 to Manchester United in Tokyo, despite a strong performance. Defender Júnior Baiano and goalkeeper Marcos faced criticism for errors on the goal, and the attack was faulted for missing numerous chances, especially in the second half.

==== Libertadores runner-up after eliminating Corinthians ====
In 2000, Palmeiras reached the Libertadores final again, losing to Boca Juniors on penalties after two draws: 2–2 at La Bombonera and 0–0 at Morumbi. In the semi-finals, Palmeiras eliminated archrival Corinthians in two epic matches. In the first leg, Corinthians won 4–3, taking the lead with a goal by midfielder Ricardinho, allowing Palmeiras to tie at 3–3, and sealing the win with a late goal by Vampeta. The second leg saw two comebacks: Palmeiras scored first through Euller; Corinthians took the lead with two goals by Luizão; and Palmeiras turned it around to win 3–2 with goals from Alex and Galeano. With the aggregate score tied, the final spot was decided on penalties for the second consecutive year. Palmeiras converted all five penalties, while Marcos saved Corinthians’ idol Marcelinho Carioca's final shot, one of the competition's most iconic moments. Earlier in 2000, Palmeiras won the Rio–São Paulo Tournament, thrashing Vasco of Edmundo and Romário 4–0. Midway through the year, with a youthful squad and a reduced investment from Parmalat, Palmeiras won the Copa dos Campeões, earning a spot in next year's Libertadores.

== Palmeiras in the 21st century ==
=== 2001–2007 ===
==== New millennium without Parmalat ====
In 2001, the first year of the new millennium without Parmalat, Palmeiras reached the Libertadores semi-finals but was eliminated by Boca Juniors on penalties, following a controversial performance by Paraguayan referee Ubaldo Aquino in the first leg at La Bombonera, according to the Brazilian side.

==== Second Division and return to the elite ====
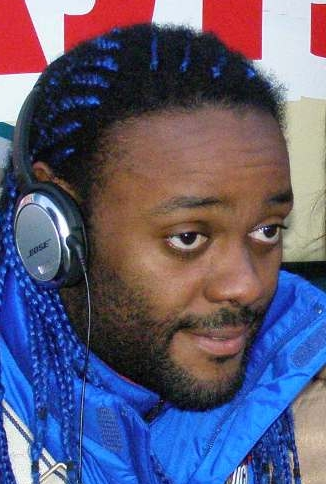
Vágner Love, key to the 2003 Série B title

In 2002, Palmeiras was relegated to the second division of the Brazilian Championship after a poor campaign, despite a theoretically strong squad that failed to deliver. The final blow came in a loss to Vitória in Bahia. In 2003, Palmeiras competed in and dominated the second division, finishing well ahead of rivals such as Botafogo, returning to the top tier the following year. The Série B champion squad underwent a major overhaul, betting on homegrown talents such as Vágner Love. Despite being in the second division, Palmeiras had the national championship's top scorer, Vágner Love, a first in club history. In 2004, Palmeiras finished fourth in the Brazilian Championship, returning to the Libertadores, where it holds the record for most appearances among Brazilian clubs, with four finals. In 2005, the Verdão again placed fourth in the Brasileirão, securing a spot in the Libertadores 2006 preliminary round, where it easily defeated Deportivo Táchira, ensuring another group stage appearance. In the round of 16, Palmeiras was eliminated by São Paulo for the second consecutive year after two close matches, with a controversial refereeing decision by Wilson Souza de Mendonça's crew, who called a nonexistent penalty on Júnior, inadvertently sparking a São Paulo counterattack. In 2006, Palmeiras had a strong Paulista Championship campaign but finished third, hampered by the absence of its star player, Juninho Paulista. In the Brazilian Championship, it had one of its worst campaigns, but avoided relegation.

==== Seeking a return to glory ====
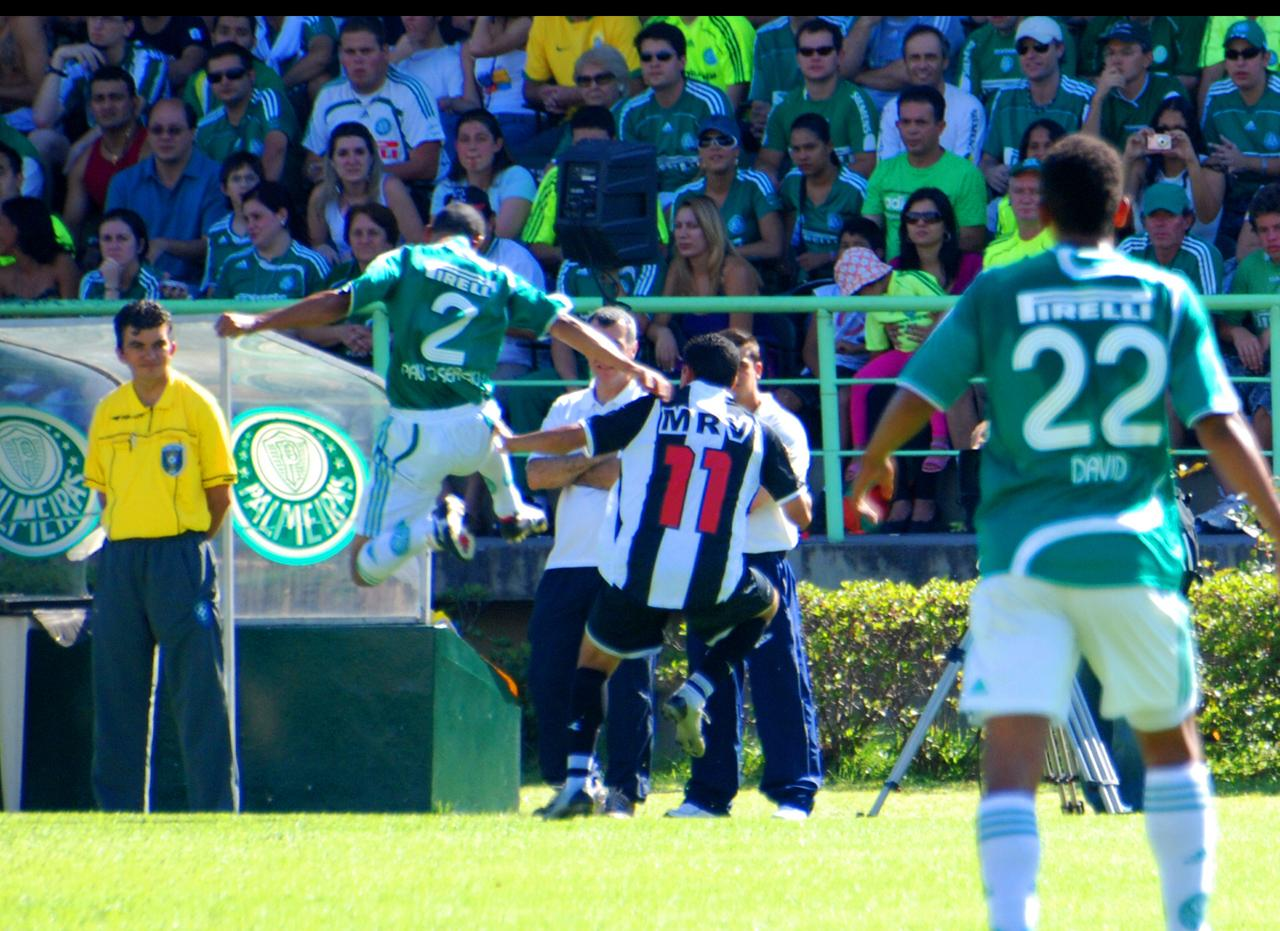
Palmeiras vs. Atlético Mineiro in 2007 at Palestra Itália Stadium.

After a turbulent end to 2006, Palmeiras began 2007 revitalized, aiming for better planning to compete for titles again.

Following a weak Brazilian Championship campaign, president Affonso Della Monica initiated a major overhaul of the football department, despite nearing the end of his first term. This began with the dismissal of football director Salvador Hugo Palaia, seen as egocentric and conflict-prone, notably in the departure of coach Tite. He was replaced by Gilberto Cipullo, a key figure during Parmalat's golden years, followed by the hiring of coach Caio Júnior and the release of several underperforming players with high salaries, such as Juninho Paulista and Marcinho. To offset losses, Palmeiras signed critically acclaimed players from the previous season, including defender Edmílson, midfielders Pierre and Martinez, and attackers Florentín and Cristiano.

With a smaller squad and a focus on long-term success, the Palmeiras of 2007 was a team in transition, facing growing fan pressure for significant titles, absent since 2000.

On the political front, Della Monica secured re-election for another two years on January 22, defeating Roberto Frizzo and challenging the political future of former president Mustafá Contursi, Frizzo's ally. Della Monica's victory relied on support from other Parmalat-era figures such as Seraphim Del Grande and Luiz Gonzaga Beluzzo, sidelined during Contursi's tenure, and a significant majority of fans hopeful for the return of administrators symbolizing the organizational excellence of the glorious 1990s.

=== 2008–2010 ===
==== The end of the state title drought and a new generation of idols ====
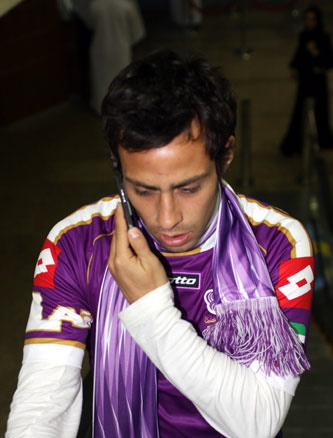
Valdivia

In 2008, Palmeiras partnered with Adidas and changed sponsors: Pirelli exited, and automaker Fiat sponsored the front and back of the jerseys. The sleeve sponsor was Suvinil paints. With a partnership with Traffic, Palmeiras invested heavily in players, with about R$40 million available. The club hired coach Wanderlei Luxemburgo, though he was not funded by Traffic. With a revamped team led by Chilean midfielder Valdívia in top form, Palmeiras won the 2008 Paulista Championship on May 4, ending a 12-year drought in the competition, defeating Ponte Preta with a commanding 6–0 aggregate score (1–0 and 5–0). Days earlier, Palmeiras was eliminated from the Copa do Brasil by Sport after a 0–0 draw at Palestra Itália and a 4–1 loss at Ilha do Retiro. In the 2008 Brazilian Championship, Luxemburgo's team emerged as a title contender but, without Valdívia, finished fourth, securing a spot in the Copa Libertadores preliminary round the following year. During this period, fans found new idols in Kléber, Valdívia, and Pierre.

==== Two years to forget ====
In 2009, Palmeiras began with significant changes, releasing several players and signing young prospects. The biggest was striker Keirrison, who scored 13 goals in his first 10 matches in the Palmeiras jersey, now sponsored by Samsung. The team surprised pundits in the Paulista Championship with the best first-phase campaign but was eliminated in the semi-finals by Santos. In the Libertadores, Palmeiras oscillated, showing the inexperience of its young players at home but excelling away, notably against Colo Colo in Chile, securing a round of 16 spot with a last-minute goal by Cleiton Xavier, and against Sport Recife in the round of 16, advancing on penalties with three saves by goalkeeper Marcos.

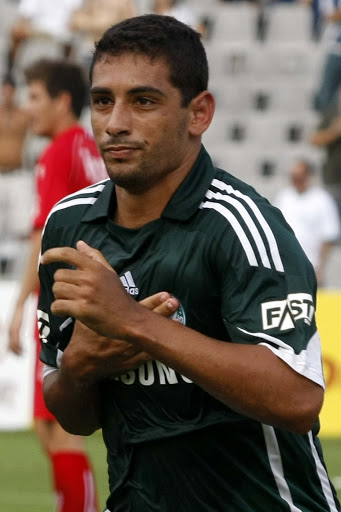
Diego Souza

Palmeiras was eliminated in the quarterfinals by Nacional, drawing 1–1 at home and 0–0 away. In the Brazilian Championship, under coach Muricy Ramalho, Palmeiras led for 19 rounds but faltered in the final stretch, finishing fifth and failing to qualify for the Libertadores, disappointing fans. On November 29, in a Brazilian Championship match against Atlético Mineiro, Palmeiras, still vying for a Libertadores spot, won 3–1, highlighted by a remarkable goal by midfielder Diego Souza. From just beyond midfield, as goalkeeper Carini cleared a ball from Vágner Love, Diego struck it first-time, lobbing the entire Atlético defense from 53 meters to score a historic goal.

In 2010, Palmeiras retained most of the previous season's squad but performed poorly in the first half, finishing 11th in the Paulista Championship and being eliminated in the Copa do Brasil quarterfinals by Atlético Goianiense. The first half saw coaching changes, with even the decorated Muricy Ramalho sacked. Tensions flared between some players and fans, notably with midfielder Diego Souza, who left after clashing with supporters. Delays in renovating the stadium added to the challenges faced by the board. The second half showed promise with the return of past idols such as coach Felipão, striker Kléber, and Valdívia. With a limited roster, the new coach focused on 2011. After a slow start, he achieved a good run in the national championship and a thrilling round of 16 qualification in the Copa Sudamericana, with Marcos Assunção’s late goal against Vitória reigniting fans’ hopes for an international title. However, the team gave up the Brazilian Championship early and was dramatically eliminated in the Copa Sudamericana semi-finals by Goiás, once again frustrating fans, who saw the decade end far less triumphantly than the late 20th century.

=== 2011–2013 ===
==== A poor start to the new decade ====
The first year of the third millennium's second decade was similar to the previous two. In the 2011 Paulista Championship, Palmeiras had a strong first phase, tying with leader São Paulo but finishing second due to fewer wins. In the single-match semi-final against archrival Corinthians, Palmeiras fought but failed to advance. With controversial refereeing by Paulo César de Oliveira, Palmeiras played most of the match a man down after defender Danilo's harsh tackle on Corinthians’ striker Liédson led to a red card. Despite this and the expulsion of coach Luiz Felipe Scolari, Palmeiras dominated and scored first at the 7th minute of the second half through defender Leandro Amaro. Corinthians equalized in the 19th minute through striker William. The match went to penalties, where Corinthians’ goalkeeper Júlio César saved Palmeiras’ sixth penalty by João Vítor, and Ramirez scored for Corinthians, advancing them to the final and breaking a Corinthians taboo, as they had never eliminated Palmeiras on penalties. Days later, in the Copa do Brasil quarterfinals, Palmeiras delivered an unrecognizable performance, suffering a 6–0 thrashing by Coritiba in Curitiba. In the return leg, they managed only a 2–0 win, resulting in elimination. In the Brazilian Championship, the team started well but hit a rough patch after a controversy involving striker Kléber, who demanded better financial recognition, leading to his dismissal by Scolari. Late in the season, Palmeiras recovered with clutch goals from midfielder Marcos Assunção but finished 11th.

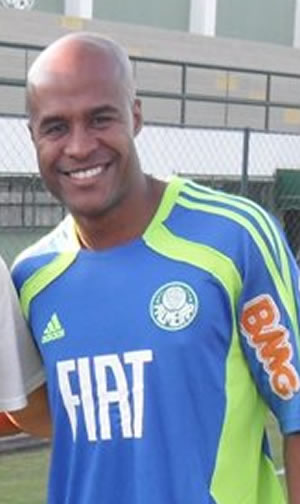
Marcos Assunção

==== Return of the national champion and another relegation ====
Palmeiras began 2012 with low expectations from the press and fans due to the weak 2011 season. The team started with few roster changes, marked by the retirement of idol Marcos, but won its first match of 2012, a friendly against Ajax, at Pacaembu Stadium. Among the few signings, the standout was Argentine striker Hernán Barcos, acquired from LDU. The team also brought in left-back Juninho from Figueirense and midfielder Daniel Carvalho in a deal with Atlético Mineiro.

Palmeiras had a steady Paulista Championship start, with Barcos scoring 13 goals in the first 10 matches, but faded late, falling in the quarterfinals to Guarani. Conversely, in the Copa do Brasil, Palmeiras was flawless, reinforcing Luiz Felipe Scolari's reputation as a knockout competition specialist. The green-and-white eliminated Coruripe from Alagoas in the first round, Horizonte from Ceará in the second, Paraná Clube in the round of 16, and Atlético Paranaense in the quarterfinals.

In the semi-finals against Grêmio, Palmeiras was considered an underdog but secured a crucial 2–0 away win at Estádio Olímpico in Porto Alegre, with Barcos and attacker Mazinho shining. In the return leg at Arena Barueri, they held a 1–1 draw, with a standout performance by midfielder Valdívia, reaching their first national competition final in 12 years. In the final against Coritiba, Palmeiras, again underestimated, was backed by fans and Scolari's solid tactics. They won the first leg 2–0 in Barueri, with goals by Valdívia and Thiago Heleno, and key contributions from Marcos Assunção. In the return leg at Estádio Couto Pereira in Curitiba, Palmeiras played brilliantly, holding Coritiba and their crowd to a 1–1 draw, securing the unbeaten title, cementing their status as Brazil's most decorated national champion with 11 titles, and qualifying for the Copa Libertadores the following year.

What seemed like a year of redemption turned into one of extremes in the second half of 2012. Despite reinforcing their record as the top national champion, Palmeiras suffered another relegation to Série B after a campaign plagued by injuries, poor planning, a limited squad, and heavily criticized management under president Arnaldo Tirone. Relegation was confirmed in the third-to-last round after a 1–1 draw with Flamengo in Volta Redonda and unfavorable results from direct competitors such as Bahia and Portuguesa.

==== Return to the elite ====
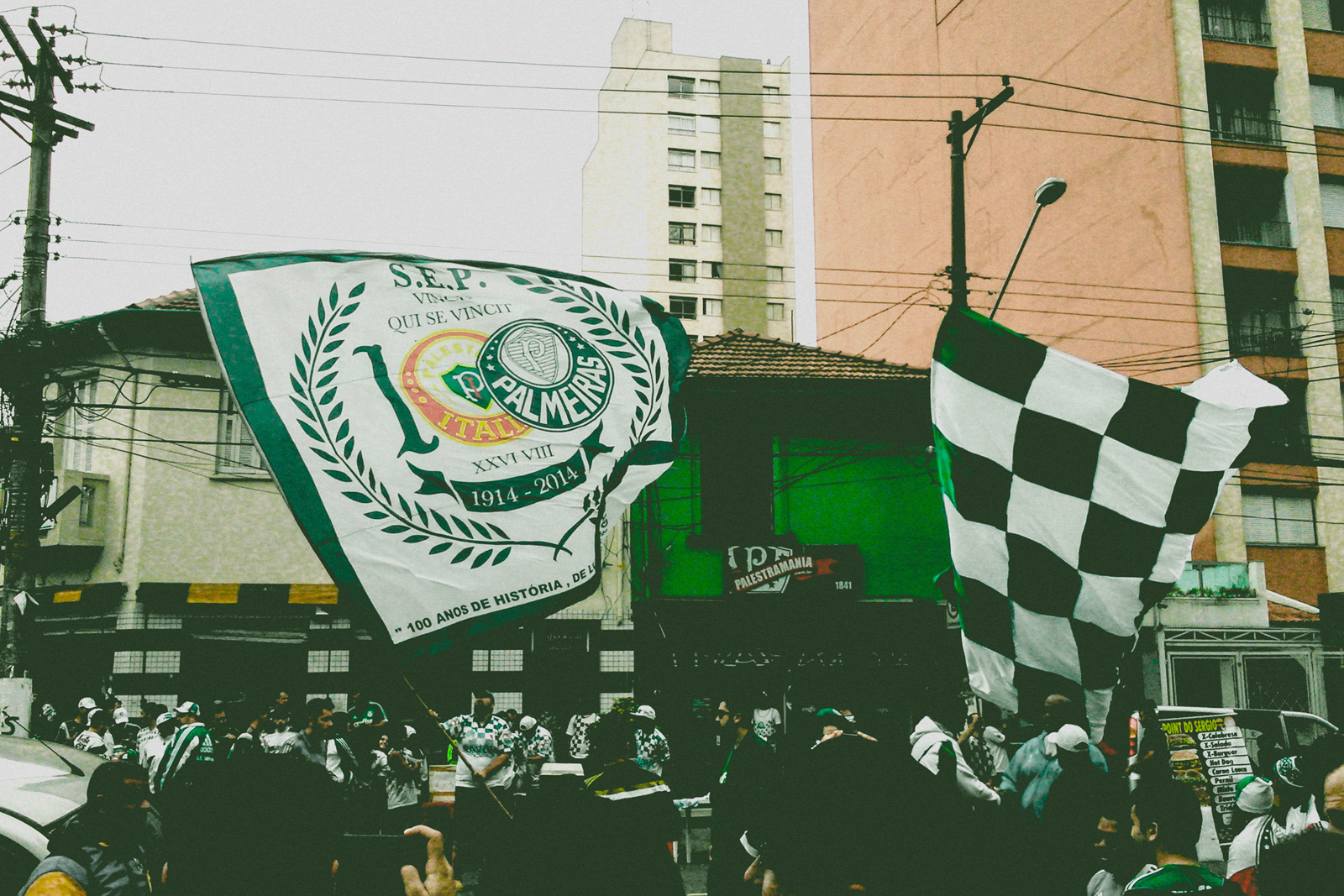
Palmeiras fans in front of the Allianz Parque on Rua Palestra Itália on match day.

After a year of triumph and relegation, Palmeiras’ main goal in 2013 was returning to the Brazilian Championship's top tier. The year began with the election of president Paulo Nobre, symbolizing hope for administrative renewal after Arnaldo Tirone's controversial tenure. The first half was challenging, with the new management restructuring the club and building a squad amid financial difficulties. In February, fans were stunned by the sale of star striker Barcos to Grêmio, who sent four players and cash to Palmeiras in return. Early in the year, Palmeiras was eliminated by Santos on penalties in the Paulista Championship round of 16. In the Copa Libertadores, buoyed by the support of the home crowd, the team performed well but was knocked out in the round of 16 at Pacaembu Stadium by Tijuana, following a glaring error by goalkeeper Bruno, who replaced Fernando Prass. In August 2013, Palmeiras revamped its Avanti fan membership program, introducing new tiers and benefits, boosting membership close to 40,000. In the 2013 Série B, with a clearly superior campaign led by Fernando Prass, Alan Kardec, and Valdivia, Palmeiras returned to Série A six rounds early, securing their spot for 2014, their centenary year. The title was clinched on November 16 with a 3–0 victory over Boa Esporte at Pacaembu Stadium.

== 2014 – Centennial, the start of the new Arena Era, and a return to greatness ==
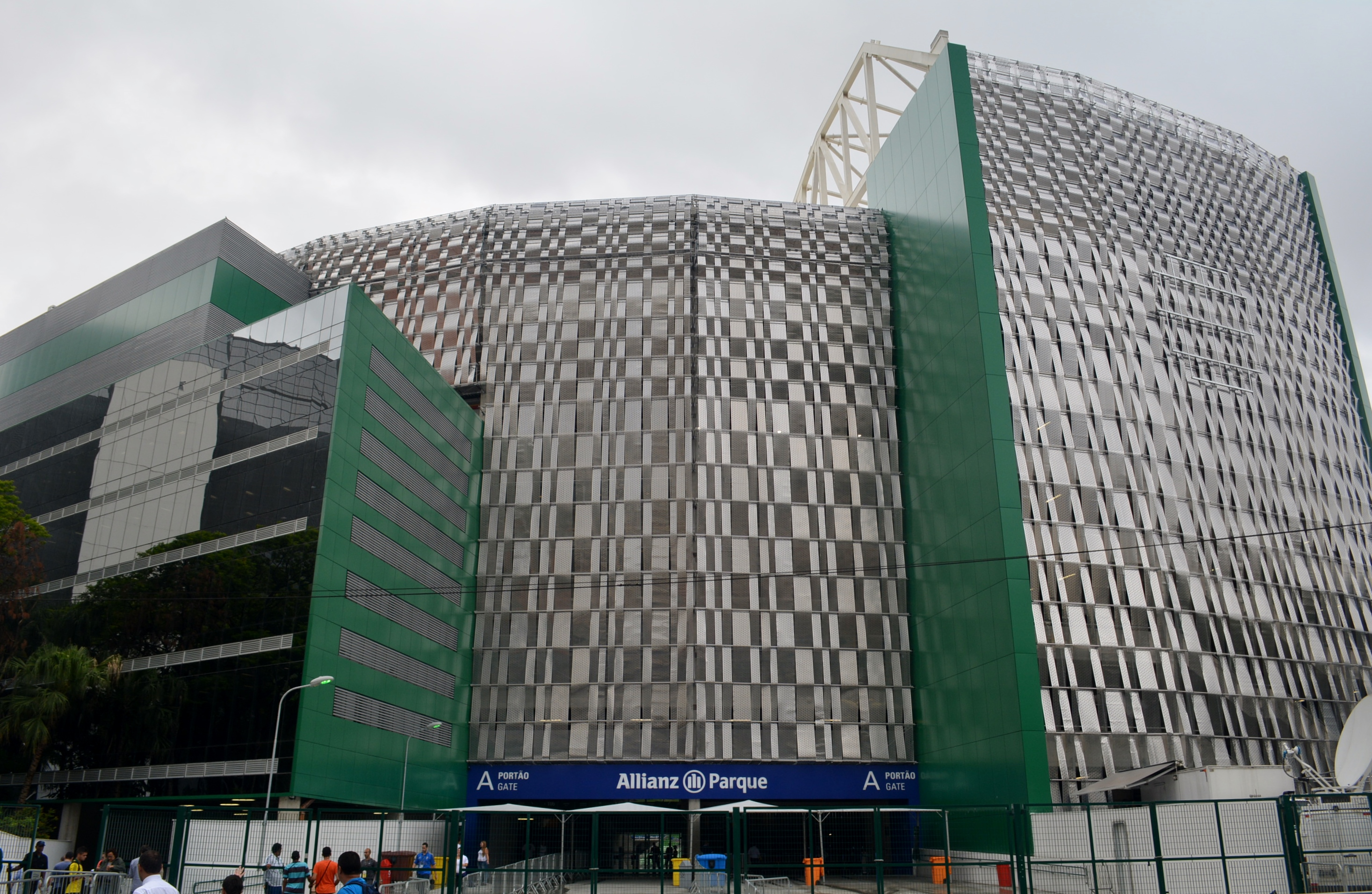
Facade of Allianz Parque in February 2015

The year 2014 marked the centennial and the inauguration of Allianz Parque, the club's new arena. Having returned to Brazil's top football tier the previous year with a commanding Série B title, Palmeiras faced challenges in restoring its reputation, tarnished by two relegations in a short span for a club with a storied winning tradition. With lackluster performances in the Campeonato Paulista and Copa do Brasil, the club cycled through multiple coaches in 2014 and narrowly avoided another relegation in the Campeonato Brasileiro. Amid numerous centennial celebrations throughout the year, Palmeira opened its arena, which quickly became one of the club's most significant assets in its resurgence.

The official inauguration of Allianz Parque took place on November 19, 2014, late in the year, during a match against Sport in the 35th round of the Brasileirão. The team's struggles were evident, as Palmeiras suffered a 2–0 defeat to the Pernambuco club. The game also made history in São Paulo football for its remarkable financial figures. It recorded the highest revenue ever for Palmeiras in a single football match and the largest gross revenue among matches played by major São Paulo clubs in the state capital. With 35,939 paying spectators, Palmeiras grossed R$4,915,885.00, with a net revenue of R$3,623,234.67.

=== The Copa do Brasil triumph ===
In 2015, the first full year of Allianz Parque's operation, the arena hosted numerous games with record-breaking attendance and revenue, culminating in Palmeiras' third Copa do Brasil title, with goalkeeper Fernando Prass emerging as the standout hero.

Months earlier, Prass had already etched his name in Palmeiras' history by playing a pivotal role in the team's advance to the Campeonato Paulista finals. In the semi-finals, he saved two penalties, enabling Palmeiras to eliminate Corinthians on their rivals' home turf. However, in the Paulistão final, Palmeiras lost to Santos on penalties at Vila Belmiro.

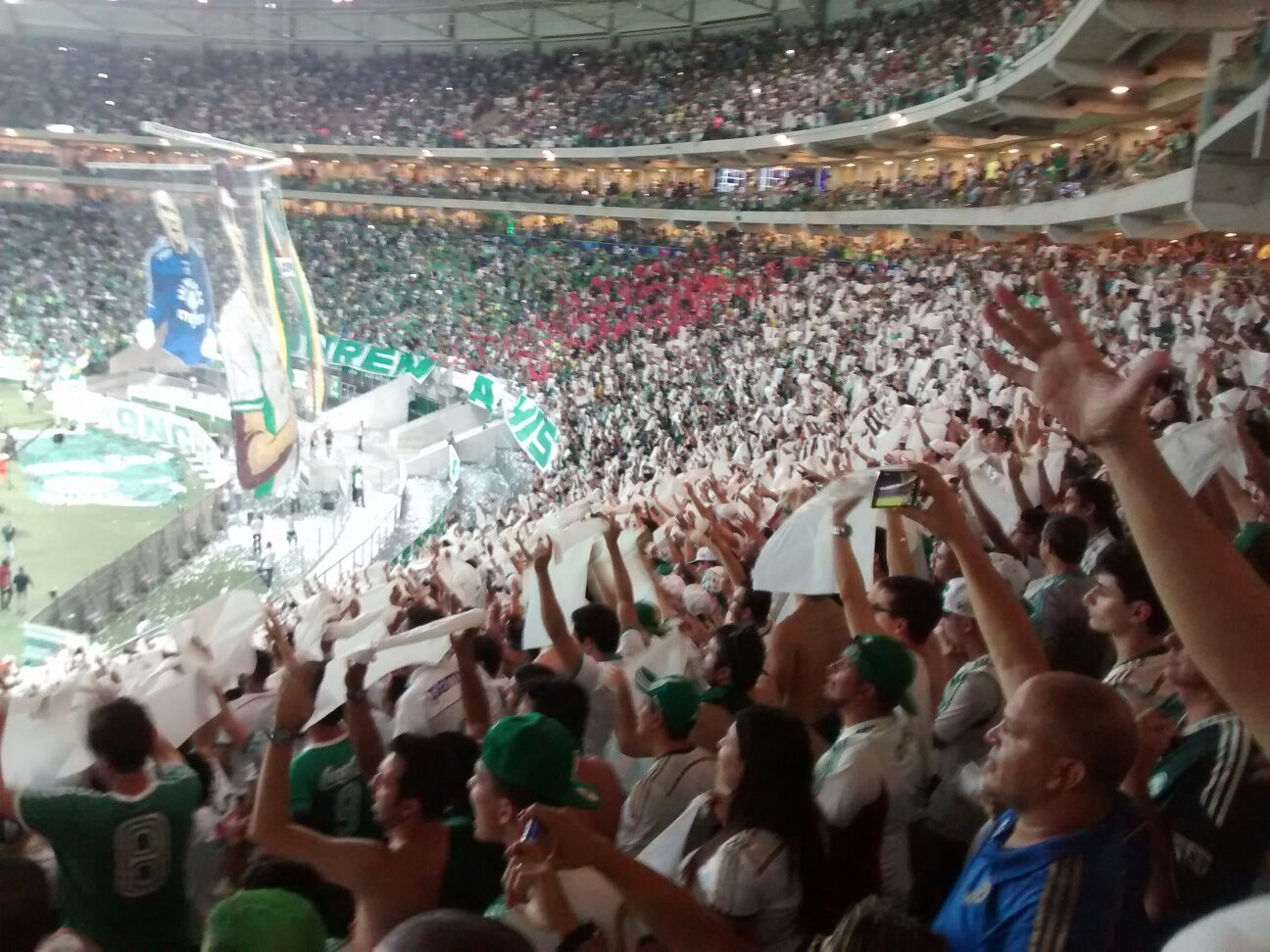
Palmeiras fans during the 2015 Copa do Brasil final

The first title in Allianz Parque's history was secured on December 2, 2015, in the arena's inaugural championship final. Palmeiras defeated Santos in regular time, needing to overturn a 1–0 deficit from the first leg. The white and green side triumphed 2–1, with striker Dudu scoring twice for Palmeiras at the 11th and 39th minutes of the second half, while Santos' center-forward Ricardo Oliveira scored in the 41st minute. With the aggregate score level, the title was decided by a penalty shootout, which Palmeiras won 4–3. Prass saved one of Santos' penalties and converted the decisive kick, securing a historic moment for the club.

With the Copa do Brasil victory, Palmeiras solidified its status as the Brazilian club with the most national titles, reaching 12 (eight Brasileiros, three Copas do Brasil, and one Copa dos Campeões).

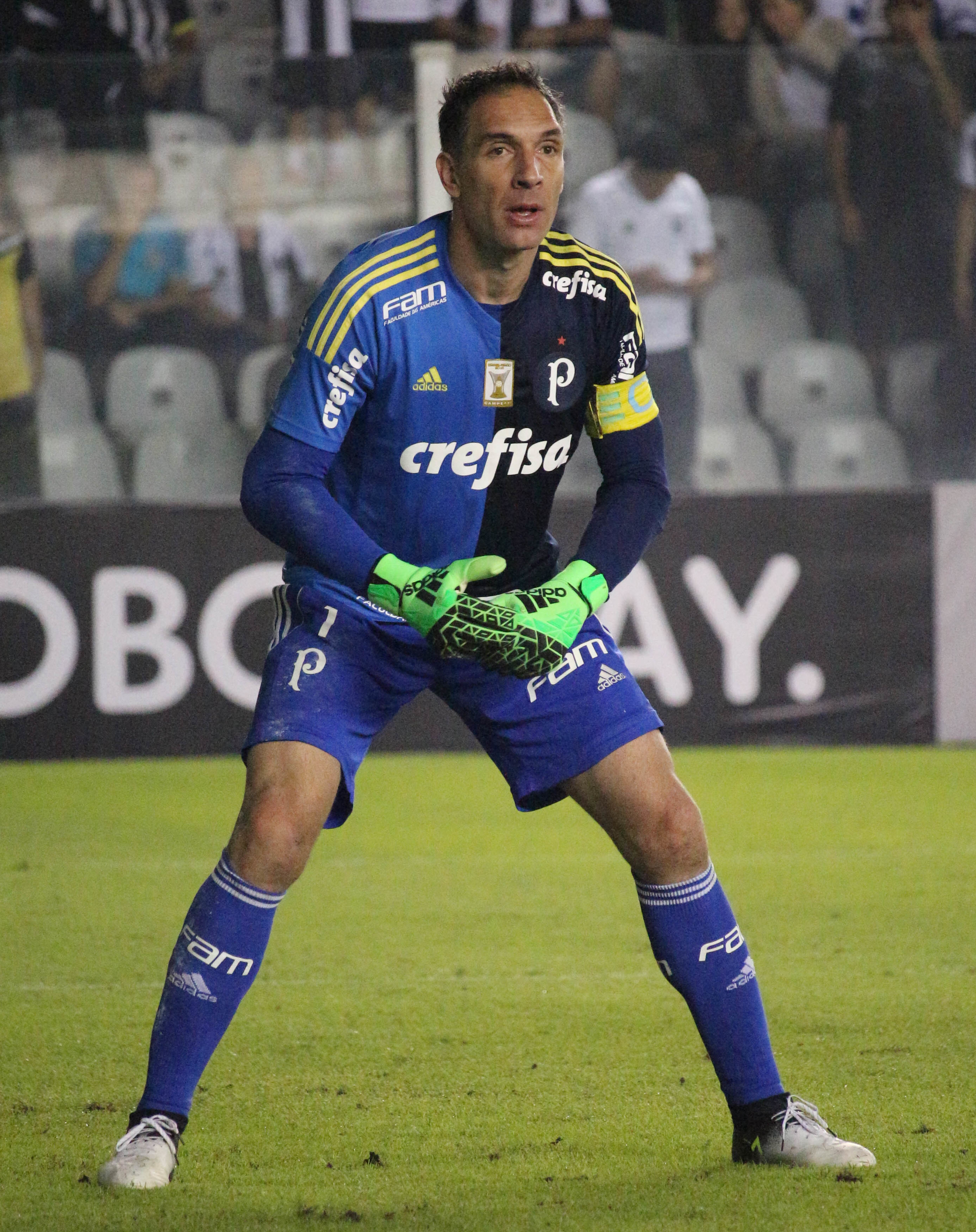
Fernando Prass

=== Campeonato Brasileiro, 22 years later ===
In 2016, under the guidance of coach Cuca and with key players such as Dudu, Gabriel Jesus, Moisés, and Zé Roberto, Palmeiras reaffirmed its return to major successes by clinching its ninth Campeonato Brasileiro title. The team led 26 of the 38 rounds and delivered the second-best campaign in the history of the points-based format. The title was secured on November 27, 2016, after a 1–0 victory over Chapecoense, with a goal by full-back Fabiano. A paid attendance of 40,986 witnessed this historic triumph, setting a new record for Allianz Parque and surpassing the previous record from the 1976 Campeonato Paulista final, when Palmeiras defeated XV de Piracicaba 1–0.

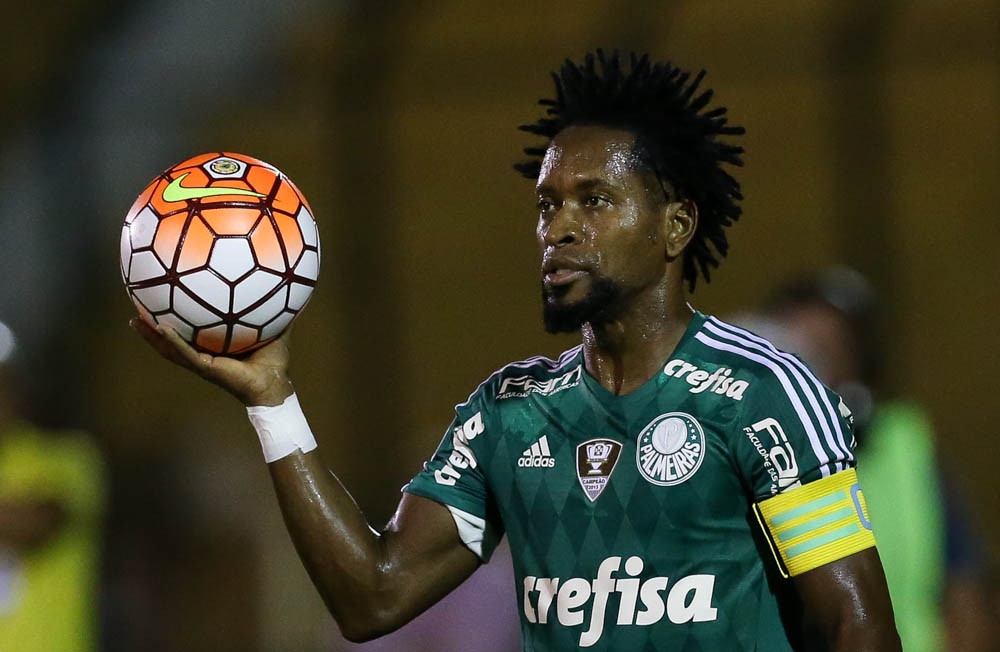
Zé Roberto

The victory ended a 22-year drought for a Brasileirão title, crowning Palmeiras as nine-time champions.

=== Ten-time champion: Brazil's greatest football champion ===
In 2018, Palmeiras clinched another national title, defeating Vasco 1–0 on November 25 at São Januário Stadium, with a second-half goal by Deyverson. This victory secured the Campeonato Brasileiro for the 10th time, a unique feat, as no Brazilian club had previously reached a decade of titles in the nation's premier tournament.

The triumph further extended Palmeiras' lead as Brazil's most decorated club, with 10 Brasileirão titles, three Copas do Brasil, and one Copa dos Campeões, totaling 14 national trophies.

Moreover, for the first time in Campeonato Brasileiro history, Palmeiras either won the title or finished as runner-up in three consecutive seasons—champions in 2016 and 2018, and second place in 2017. The team also secured a fourth consecutive appearance in the CONMEBOL Libertadores, a first in club history.

Palmeiras' campaign featured 23 wins, 11 draws, and only four losses, scoring 61 goals and conceding 24. The team played 18 home games (14 at Allianz Parque and four at Pacaembu Stadium), with 15 wins, two draws, and one loss, and 19 away games, yielding seven wins, nine draws, and three losses.

Crowned champions with 77 points and one round to spare, Palmeiras finished the first half of the season in sixth place, eight points behind leaders Flamengo. A remarkable second half, however, propelled them to the title, earning 44 points in 18 games and going 18 matches unbeaten. Including three unbeaten games before the second half, Palmeiras achieved a record 23-match unbeaten streak in the points-based era (since 2003), surpassing Corinthians' 19-game streak in 2017. With one game remaining against Vitória at home, the streak could extend further.

Under coach Luiz Felipe Scolari, Palmeiras surpassed their 15-game unbeaten streak from the 2016 Brasileirão and the 18-game streak from 1997/1998. The next targets are the 23-game unbeaten run of 1994 and the record 26-game streak between 1972 and 1973.

Palmeiras led the league in several metrics: most wins (21), fewest losses (4), best attack (60 goals), best defense (24 goals conceded), and best goal difference (36). According to Footstats data up to the 36th round, Palmeiras led in dribbles (247), interceptions (212), tackles (811), long passes (1578), and ball switches (161).

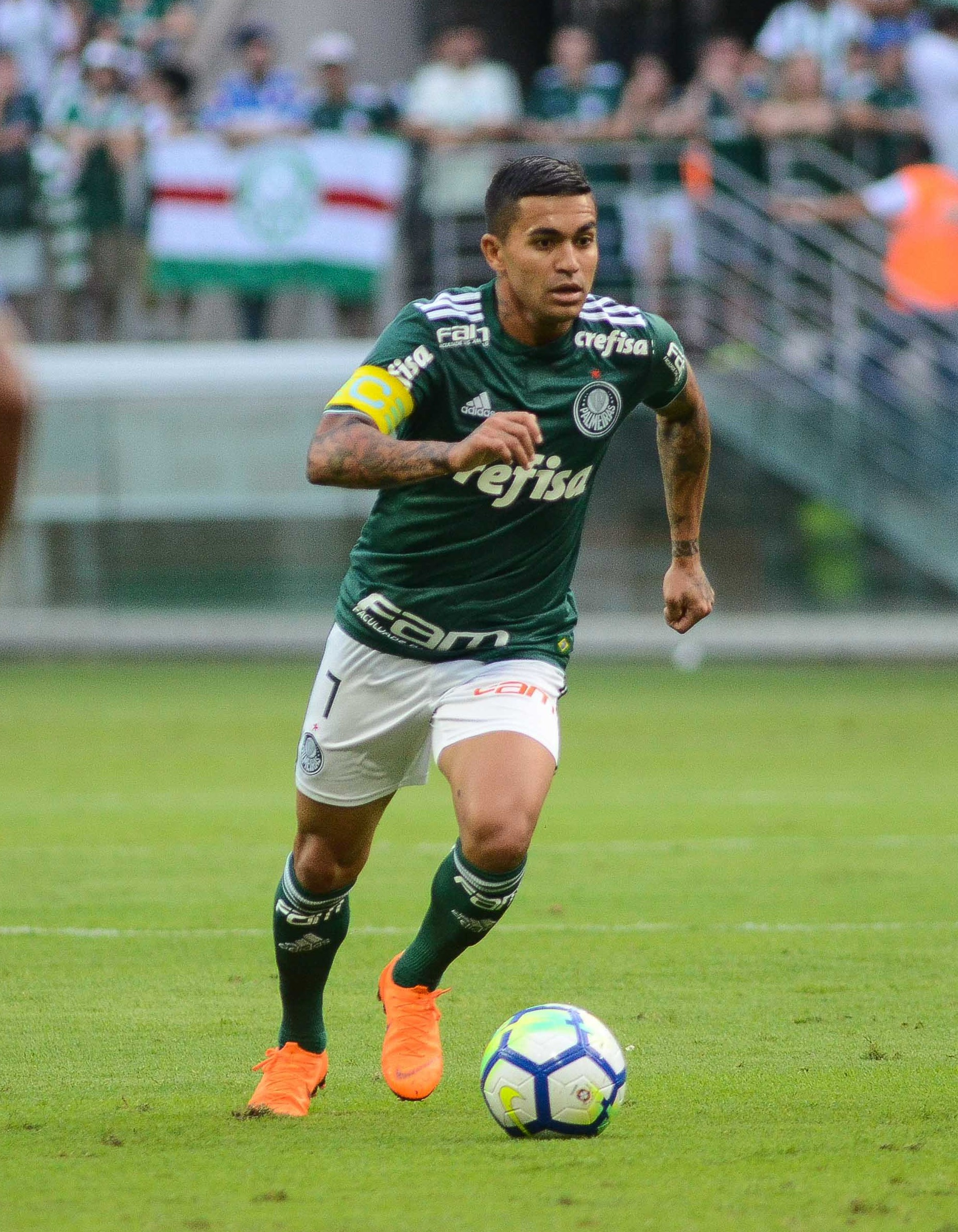
Dudu

The team was managed by two head coaches—Roger Machado (six wins, five draws, four losses) and Luiz Felipe Scolari (15 wins, five draws)—along with Wesley Carvalho (one win) and Paulo Turra (one draw), using 29 players. Scolari, Brazil's most successful coach, won his second Brasileirão title, following his 1996 triumph with Grêmio.

Midfielder Lucas Lima led Palmeiras in appearances with 33 games, followed by Bruno Henrique and Willian, each with 32. Willian topped the team's scoring chart with 10 goals, followed by Deyverson with nine. Dudu led in assists with 12.

Of the 2018 championship squad, 11 players were also part of the 2016 Brasileirão championship team, giving them the status of two-time champions: goalkeepers Fernando Prass and Jailson, defenders Edu Dracena and Thiago Martins, midfielders Thiago Santos, Jean, Moisés, Vitinho, and Tchê Tchê, and forwards Artur and Dudu. Notably, Jean, Edu Dracena, and Willian became four-time Brasileirão champions, joining an elite group including goalkeeper Emerson Leão, defender Antônio Carlos Zago, and midfielder Amaral, behind the five-time champions Dudu, Ademir da Guia, and Zinho.

Palmeiras defeated 18 of their 19 Brasileirão opponents at least once, with Flamengo being the only team they did not beat, drawing 1–1 in both encounters.

=== Pandemic and historic Paulista title against Corinthians ===
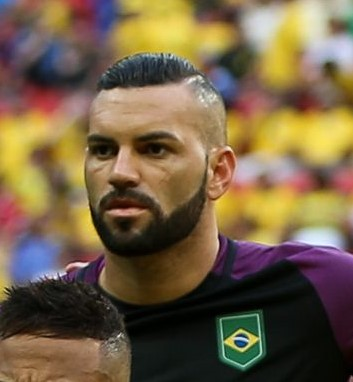
Weverton

The year 2020 was overshadowed by the COVID-19 pandemic, which claimed thousands of lives globally and halted sports competitions from March to July. Consequently, the Campeonato Paulista was paused, with its final decided only in August, rather than the usual April. Despite the somber context, Palmeiras fans experienced a historic joy, as the club faced and defeated their archrival Corinthians in the state championship final. Corinthians, struggling in the tournament, gained momentum after defeating Palmeiras near the end of the first phase in the first-ever fanless Derby Paulista, adhering to safety measures to curb the virus's spread. Beyond the storied rivalry, the 2020 Paulista finals carried the weight of Palmeiras' frustration from the controversial 2018 final, when Corinthians won the title at Allianz Parque. The final also offered Corinthians a chance at an unprecedented fourth consecutive Paulista title, a feat only achieved by Paulistano in the amateur era.

The first final, criticized by media and fans for its poor quality, ended in a 0–0 draw at Arena Corinthians. The decisive match took place at Allianz Parque on August 8, the same day Brazil surpassed 100,000 COVID-19 deaths.

With no fans due to the pandemic but with mosaics arranged by Palmeiras supporters, the first fanless Paulista final on artificial turf saw Palmeiras lead 1–0 (goal by Luiz Adriano) until the 51st minute of stoppage time. In a dramatic twist, Corinthians' striker Jô was fouled by Palmeiras defender Gustavo Gómez in the penalty area in the final second. Jô converted the penalty, tying the game and forcing a shootout.

In the penalties, Corinthians' goalkeeper Cássio saved one shot, but Palmeiras' Weverton saved two, emerging as the hero. The decisive penalty was scored by young debutant Patrick de Paula, a recent academy graduate who had played in Rio de Janeiro's Taça das Favelas two years earlier.

The title ended Palmeiras' 12-year Paulista drought, prevented Corinthians from winning the title four times and gave Palmeiras a 4–3 edge in head-to-head Paulista finals against their rivals.

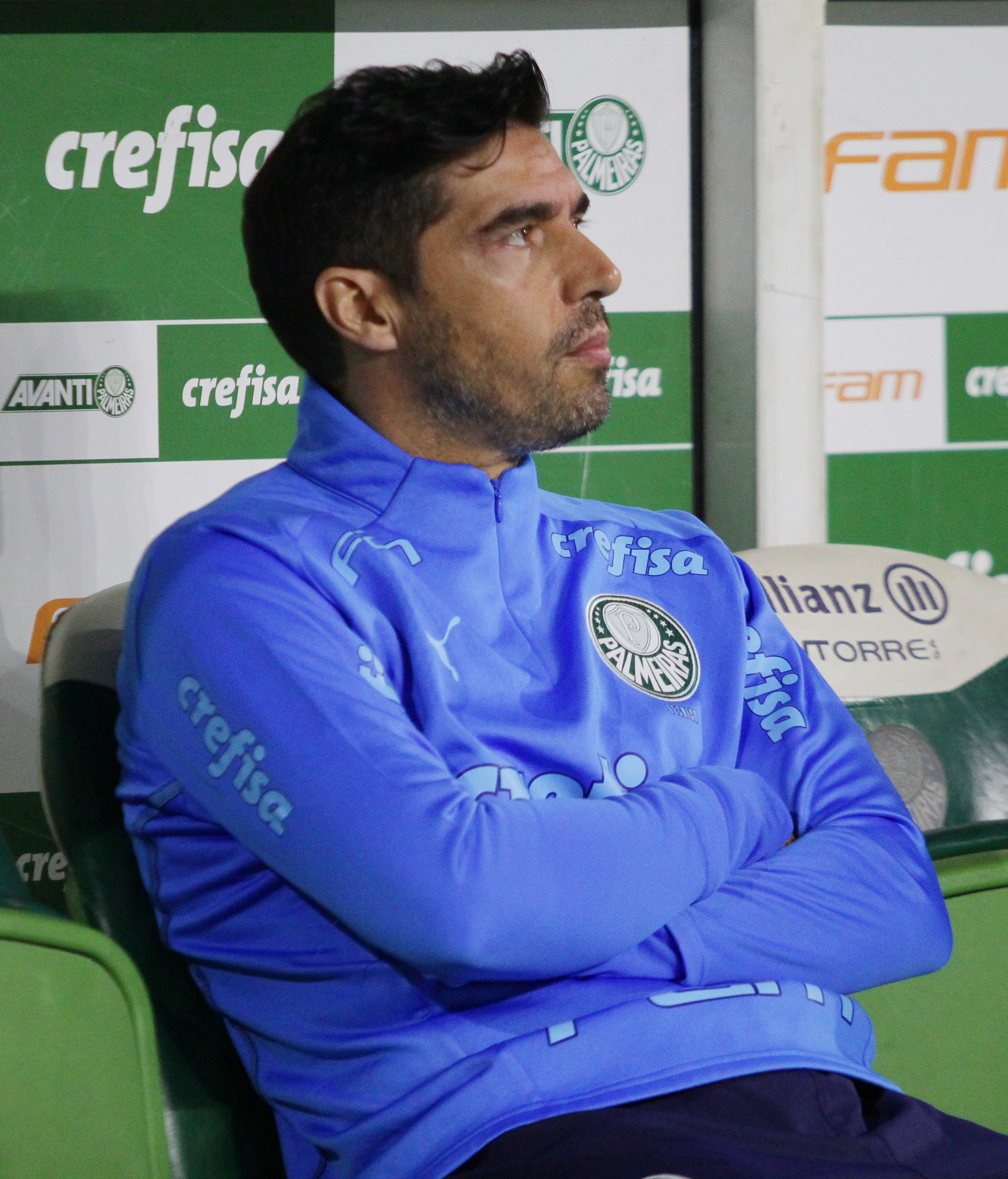
Abel Ferreira

=== Protagonist in all competitions ===
Like the Campeonato Paulista, other major football competitions worldwide faced delays due to the pandemic. This included the 2020 Copa Libertadores, 2020 Copa do Brasil, and 2020 Campeonato Brasileiro Série A, with their decisive phases extending into 2021. In all these tournaments, Palmeiras was a leading contender, finishing among the top six in the Brasileirão for most of 2020 and reaching the finals of both the Copa do Brasil and Libertadores.

After the Paulista triumph over Corinthians, coach Vanderlei Luxemburgo's tenure was short-lived. Despite decent standings, the team's uninspiring play dissatisfied fans and media. Luxemburgo was sacked in October after a 3–1 home loss to Coritiba in the Brasileirão.

Assistant coach Andrey Lopes, nicknamed Cebola, took over and revitalized the team, delivering exciting, high-scoring performances across the three competitions. This attacking style, dubbed "Cebolismo" by fans and media, reinvigorated the squad.

Palmeiras then appointed Portuguese coach Abel Ferreira, previously with PAOK in Greece. Ferreira built on Cebola's approach, making adjustments while maintaining competitiveness despite a tight schedule, key injuries, and a COVID-19 outbreak affecting 20 players.

In the 2020 Libertadores, Palmeiras topped the group stage for the third consecutive year and reached the quarterfinals for the third time in a row, advancing to the final and securing its second title. In the Copa do Brasil, entering the round of 16 due to their Libertadores participation, Palmeiras eliminated Bragantino with a 3–1 away win and a 1–0 home victory. In the quarterfinals, they dispatched Ceará with a 3–0 home win and a 2–2 draw in Fortaleza. In the semi-finals, they ousted América-MG with a 1–1 home draw and a 2–0 away win. This marked Palmeiras’ third Copa do Brasil final appearance in a decade, with the final set for 2021.

In the Brasileirão, Palmeiras remained in the top four until late 2020 but slipped slightly in 2021 as they focused on the Libertadores semi-finals and final. A highlight was a celebrated 4–0 thrashing of Corinthians at Allianz Parque in January 2021, during the second half of the pandemic-stricken season, which saw more than 200,000 deaths from COVID-19 in Brazil by the day of the match. Played on a Monday night without fans, Palmeiras dominated a Corinthians side on a four-game winning streak. Midfielder Raphael Veiga and striker Luiz Adriano scored twice each, keeping Palmeiras in the title race and matching the biggest Derby Paulista win of the 21st century, along with Palmeiras' 4–0 victory in 2004. It was the largest margin in the rivalry since the new arenas opened.

=== Two-time winners of the Copa Libertadores ===
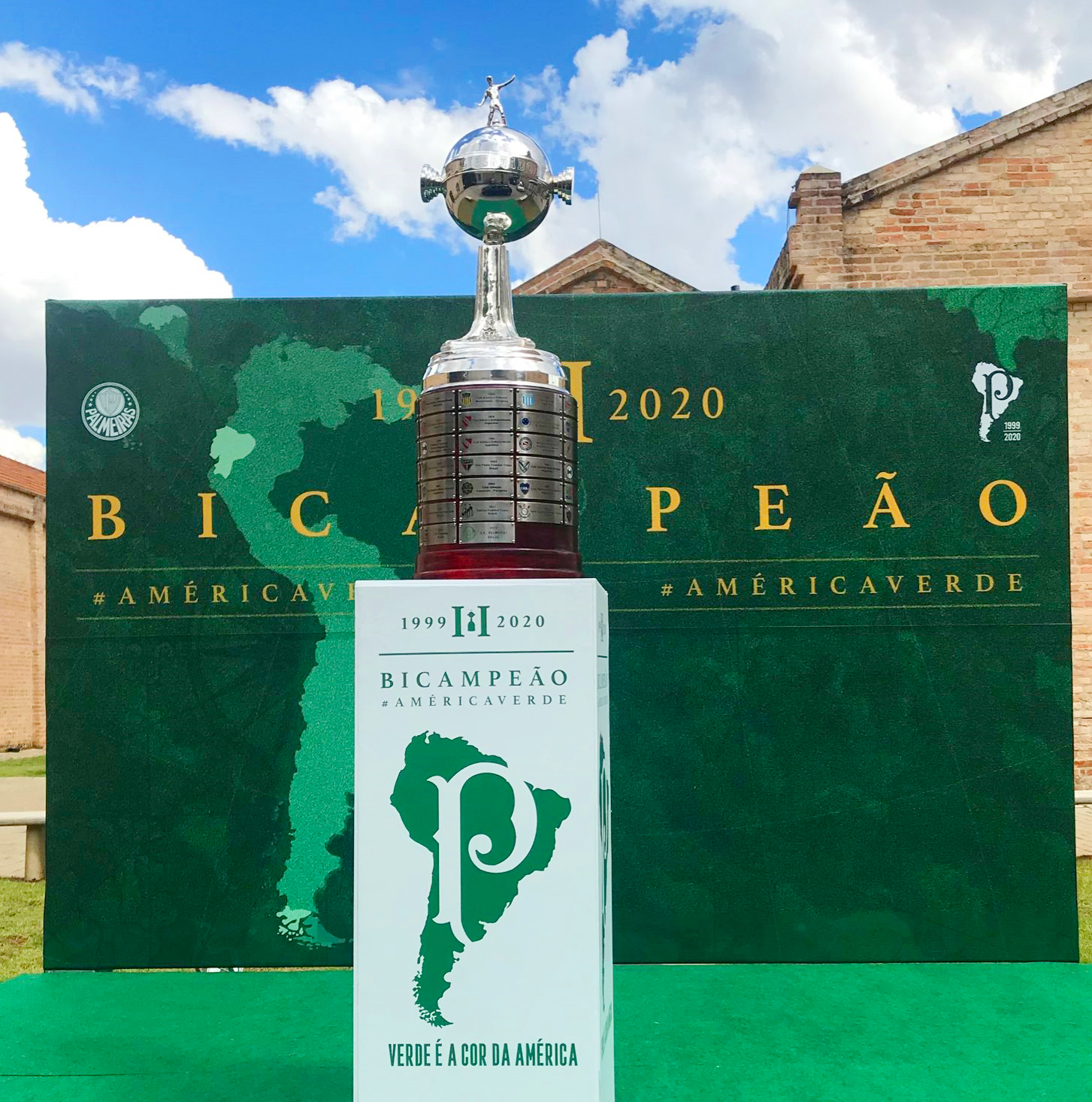
The 2020 Copa Libertadores trophy won by Palmeiras, displayed at an exhibition

On January 30, 2021, Palmeiras and Santos played the most significant match in the history of the Clássico da Saudade in the 2020 Copa Libertadores final. Delayed by the pandemic, the single-leg final at Maracanã Stadium occurred in early 2021, with no paying fans but approximately 5,000 CONMEBOL guests.

Palmeiras had eliminated River Plate in the semi-finals with a historic 3–0 away win and a dramatic 2–0 home loss. Santos, meanwhile, dispatched Boca Juniors with a draw in Buenos Aires and a 3–0 home win.

The match marked the first São Paulo state final at Maracanã and in Libertadores history, the third all-Brazilian final, and the fifth final for both clubs. It offered Palmeiras a chance at a second title and Santos a shot at a fourth. The game was refereed by Patricio Loustau.

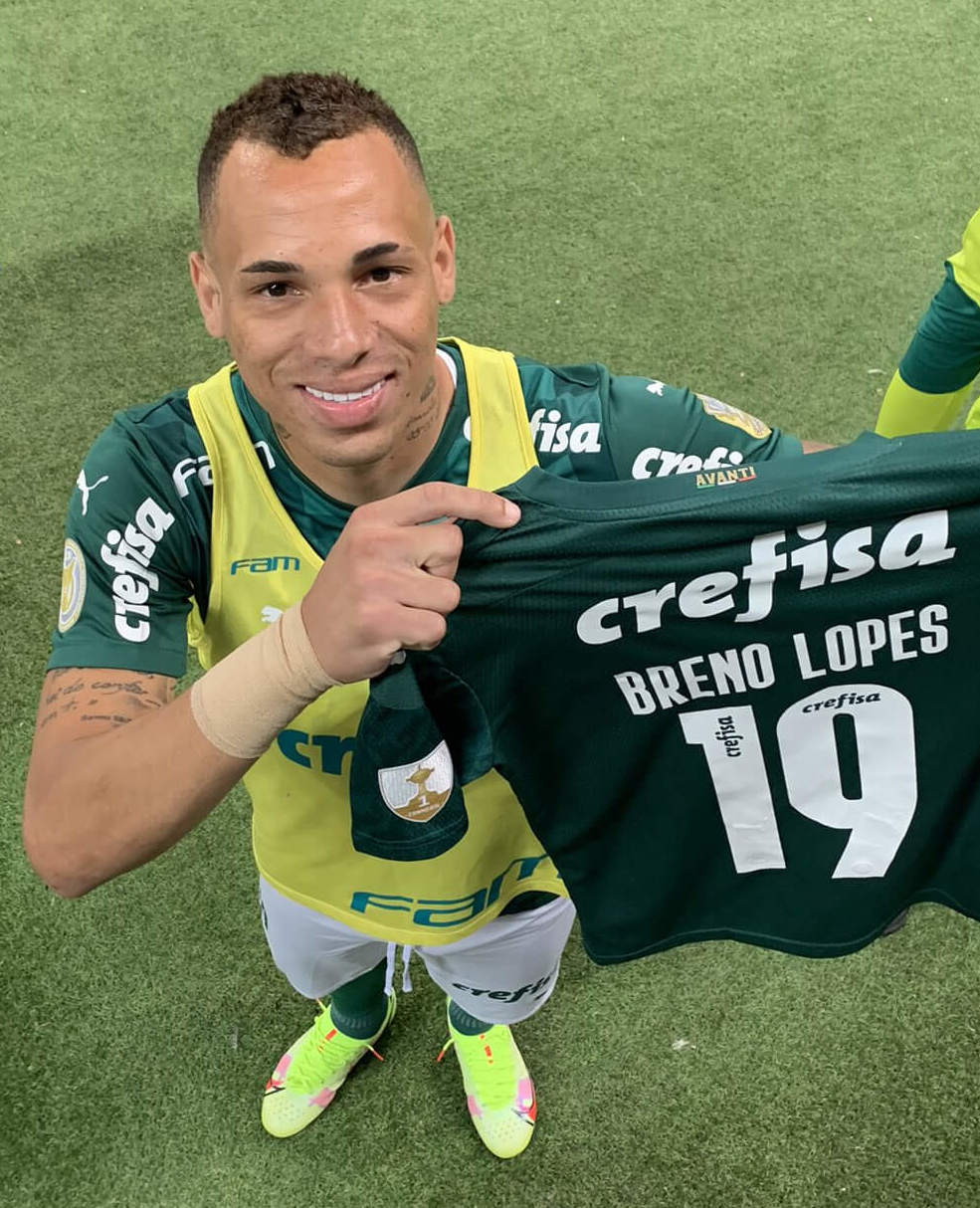
Breno Lopes, hero of the 2020 Libertadores triumph

In a tense, physical match under intense heat, both teams created few chances. As extra time loomed, Palmeiras scored in the 54th minute of stoppage time, with Breno Lopes heading in a cross from Rony. The 1–0 victory secured Palmeiras’ second Libertadores title after a 21-year wait, denying Santos a fourth.

The victory earned Palmeiras a spot in the 2020 FIFA Club World Cup in Qatar and the 2021 Recopa Sudamericana against Defensa y Justicia, the 2020 Copa Sudamericana champions. Palmeiras received US$15 million (R$80 million) for the title, while Santos earned US$6 million (R$32 million) as runners-up.

With the continental title, Abel Ferreira became the third European coach to win the Libertadores, the second Portuguese after Jorge Jesus’s 2019 victory with Flamengo.

=== Failure at the FIFA Club World Cup ===
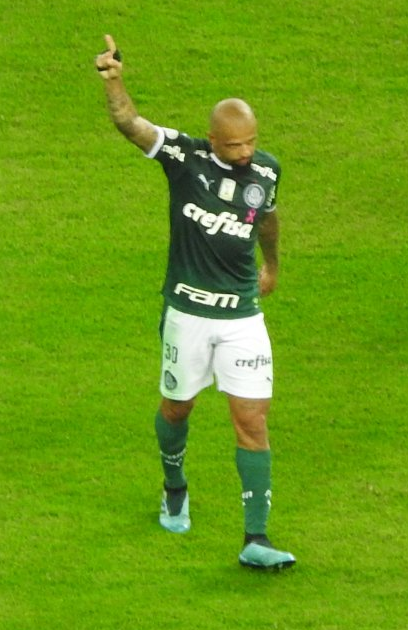
Felipe Melo

Just over a week after winning the Libertadores in Rio, Palmeiras competed in the 2020 FIFA Club World Cup in Qatar in February 2021 as South America's representative, having qualified for the semi-finals in accordance with the tournament's rules. It was their first FIFA-organized world championship, offering a chance to expand their international accolades. However, the grueling 2020 season and limited time to recover from the Libertadores celebrations took their toll.

In the semi-finals, Palmeiras faced Tigres, the CONCACAF champions. In a hard-fought match, Palmeiras lost 1–0, with a penalty goal by French striker Gignac. The defeat ended their title hopes, with Bayern Munich winning the tournament.

In the third-place match, Palmeiras struggled again, drawing 0–0 with Al Ahly. Al Ahly won the penalty shootout, leaving Palmeiras in fourth place, the worst performance by a South American team in the FIFA Club World Cup since its inception in 2000.

=== Four-time champion of the Copa do Brasil and winner of the treble ===
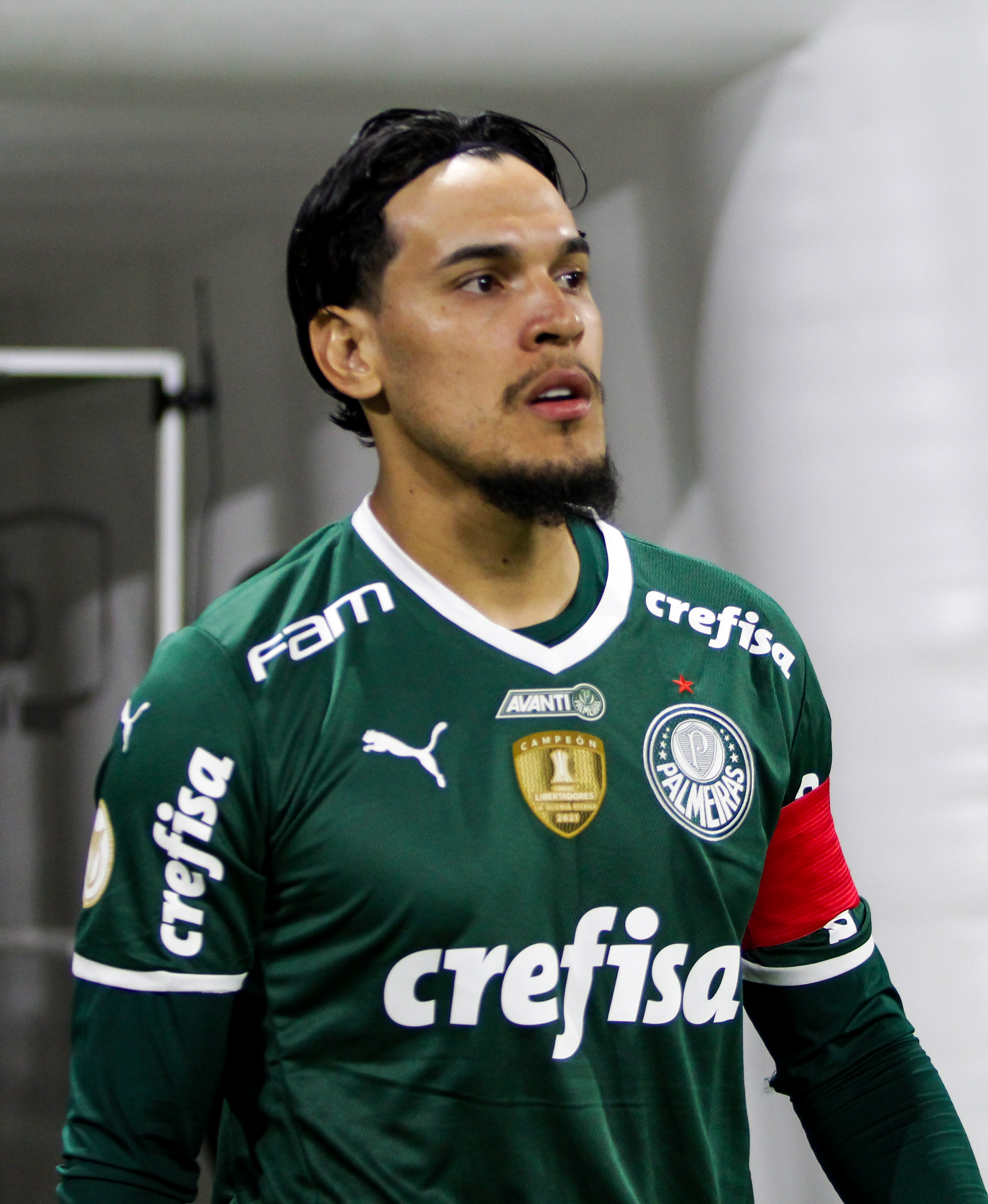
Gustavo Gómez, Palmeiras’ captain and defender

Palmeiras’ 2020 season extended into the third quarter of 2021, with their final match played in March 2021—the 2020 Copa do Brasil final against Grêmio. After a 1–0 away win in Porto Alegre, with a goal by Gustavo Gómez, Palmeiras needed only a draw at Allianz Parque to claim the title. They dominated, defeating Grêmio 2–0 with goals from youngsters Wesley and Gabriel Menino.

The victory marked several milestones: Palmeiras’ fourth Copa do Brasil title, their 15th national title, reinforcing their status as Brazil’s most successful club in national competitions, and a treble in 2020, encompassing the Campeonato Paulista, Copa Libertadores, and Copa do Brasil. It was the fourth title won at Allianz Parque since its opening and the second without fans, again due to the pandemic.

=== Three-time Copa Libertadores winner ===
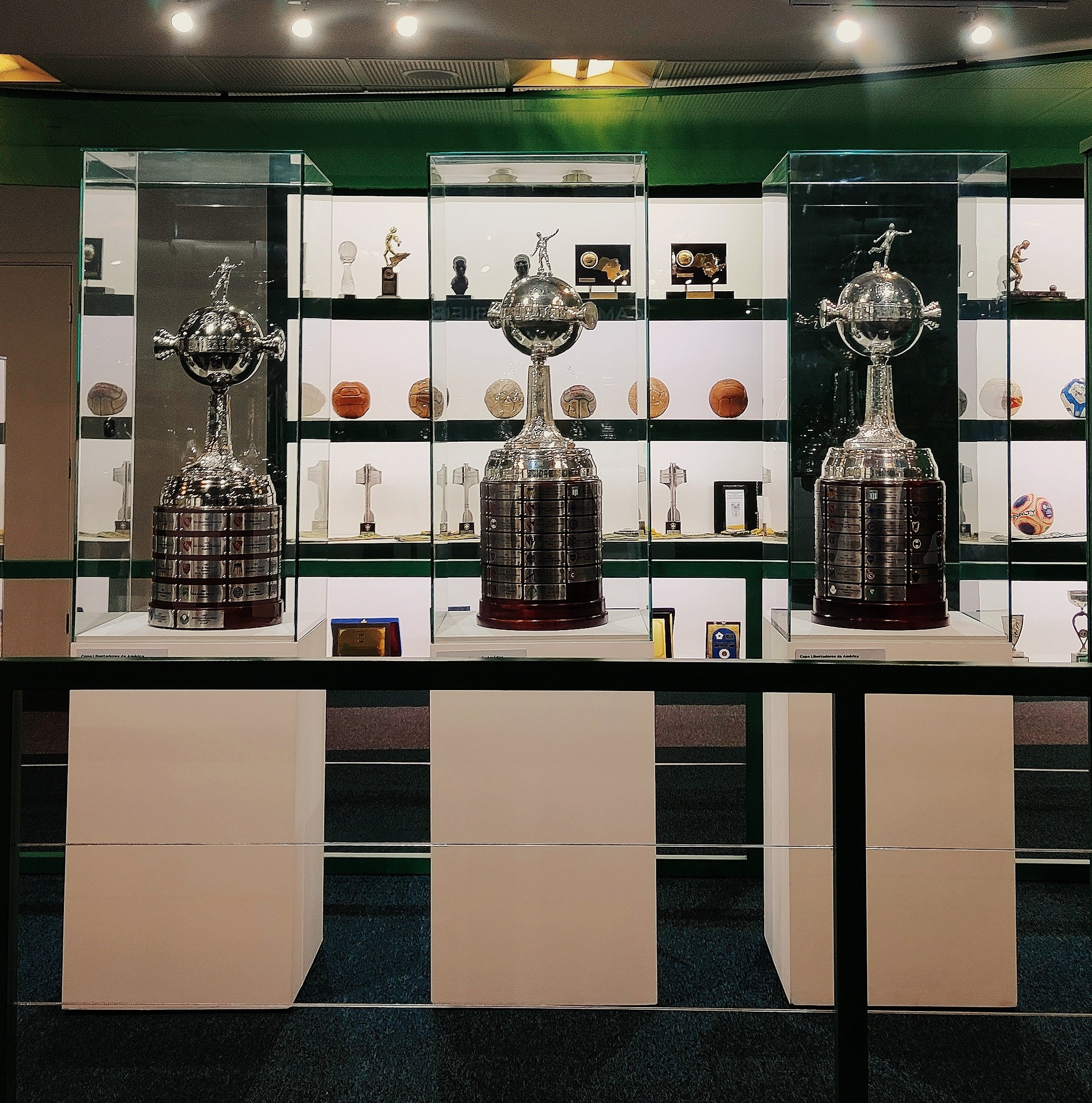
The three Copa Libertadores trophies displayed in Palmeiras’ trophy room

After their 2020 titles, Palmeiras remained a dominant force. Except for an early Copa do Brasil exit to CRB, they were runners-up in the Paulista (losing to São Paulo), the Supercopa do Brasil (drawing with Flamengo and losing on penalties), and the Recopa Sudamericana (losing to Defensa y Justicia on penalties).

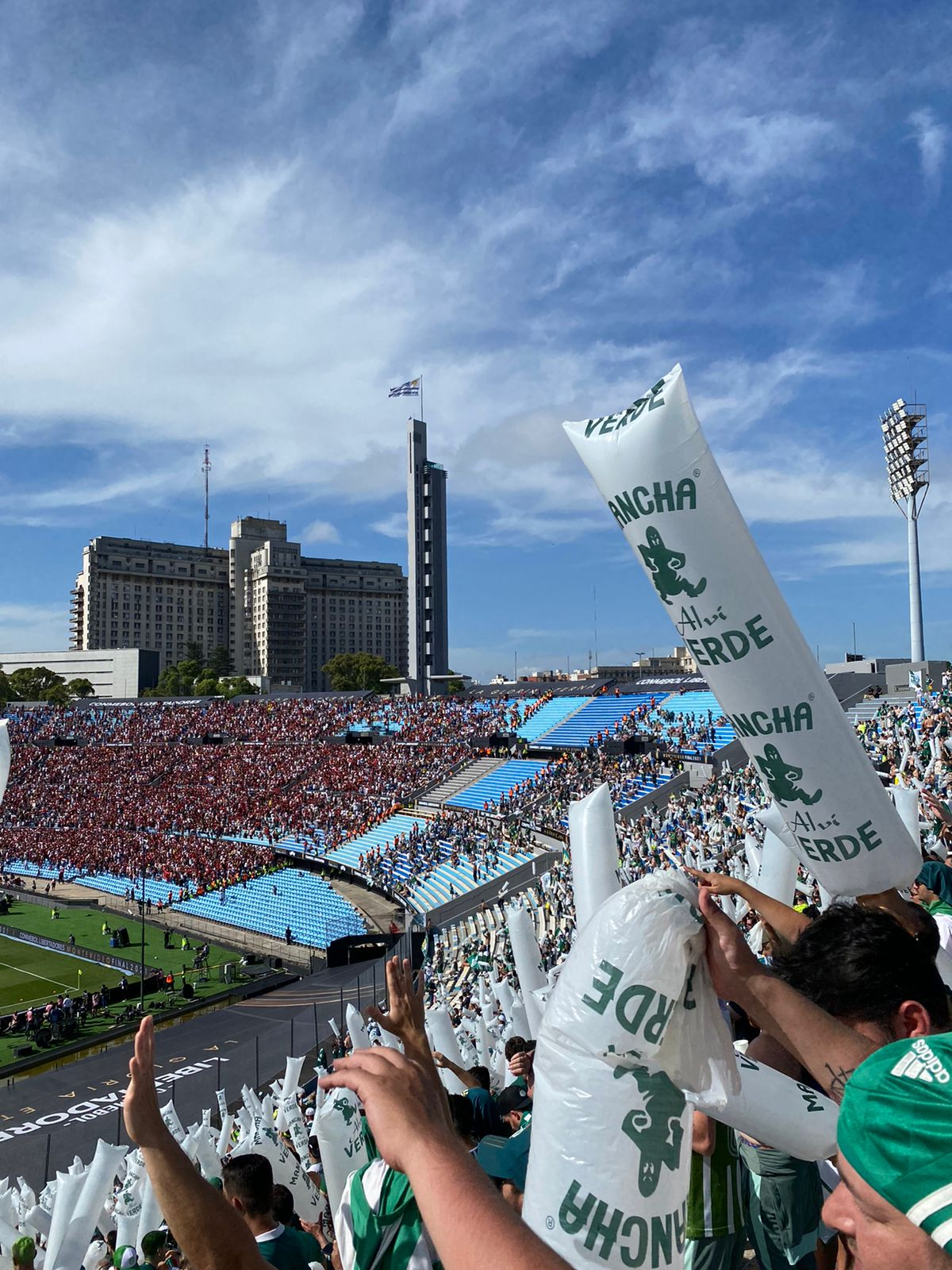
Palmeiras fans at Estadio Centenario

In the 2021 Brasileiro, Palmeiras led early and stayed in the top three for most of the season but finished third.

The season's sole title was the most prestigious: a third Copa Libertadores triumph. Facing Flamengo, favored by many due to their star-studded squad, Palmeiras defended their title in a historic match at Montevideo’s Estadio Centenario. They won 2–1, with Raphael Veiga scoring early, Flamengo's Gabigol equalizing, and Deyverson netting the decisive goal in extra time after capitalizing on a mistake by Andreas Pereira.

The title made Palmeiras one of the most successful clubs in Libertadores history, setting multiple records and becoming the only team to win the competition twice in the same year.

=== Runners-up at the FIFA Club World Cup ===
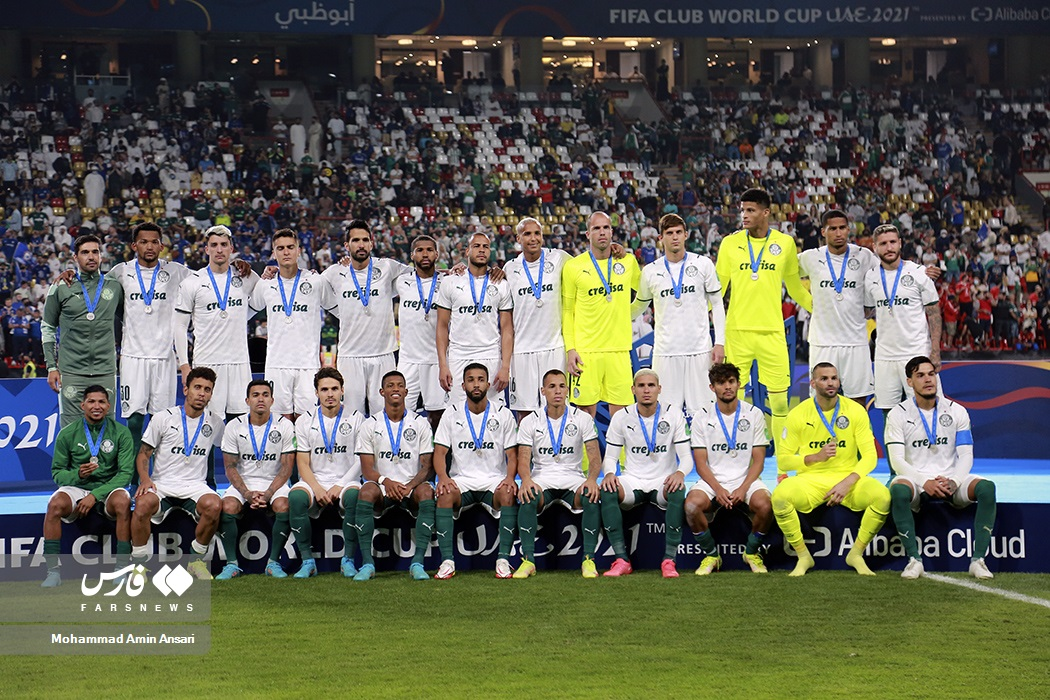
Palmeiras’ runner-up squad at the 2021 FIFA Club World Cup

With the Libertadores victory over Flamengo, Palmeiras earned another shot at a FIFA Club World Cup title, over 70 years after their 1951 Copa Rio win. Better prepared, Palmeiras performed convincingly at the 2021 FIFA Club World Cup in the United Arab Emirates in February 2022, delayed by COVID-19.

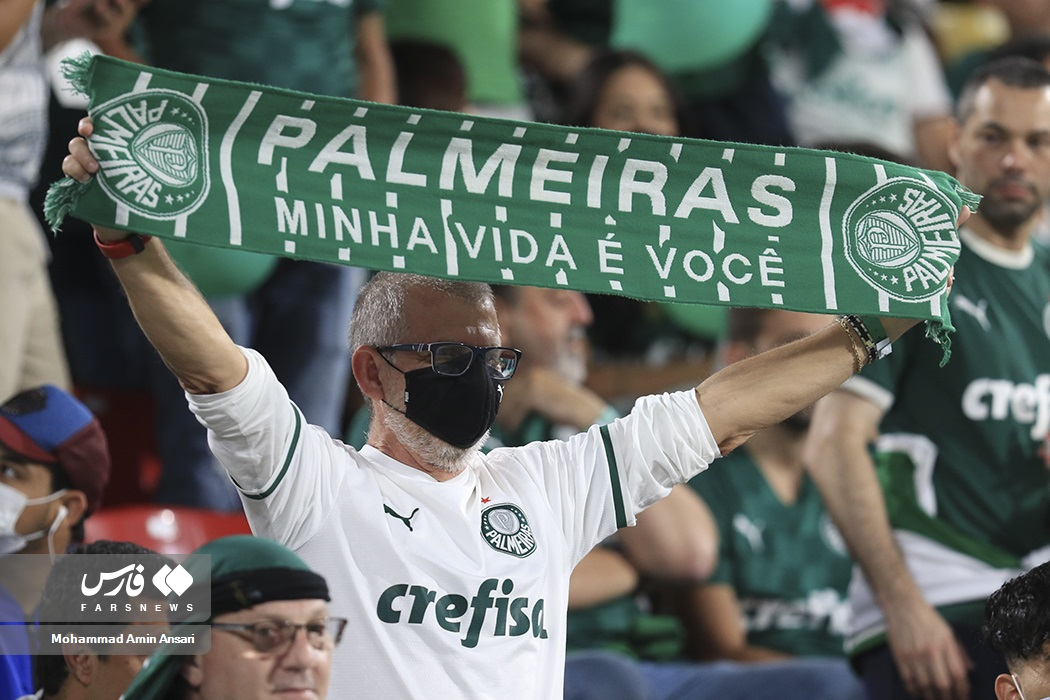
Palmeiras fans in Abu Dhabi

In the semi-finals, Palmeiras defeated Al Ahly, the 2020–21 CAF Champions League winners, 2–0 at Al Nahyan Stadium in Abu Dhabi, with goals by Dudu and Raphael Veiga, backed by a massive fan presence.

In the final, Palmeiras faced Chelsea, winners of the 2020–21 UEFA Champions League, who had beaten Al Hilal in the semi-finals. In a tightly contested match at Mohammed bin Zayed Stadium, with another strong Palmeiras fan turnout, the teams drew 1–1, with Chelsea's Romelu Lukaku and Palmeiras’ Raphael Veiga (from a penalty) scoring. In extra time, Chelsea's Kai Havertz scored a penalty three minutes from the end, securing a 2–1 victory and their first world title, leaving Palmeiras as runners-up.

=== Recopa Sudamericana title ===
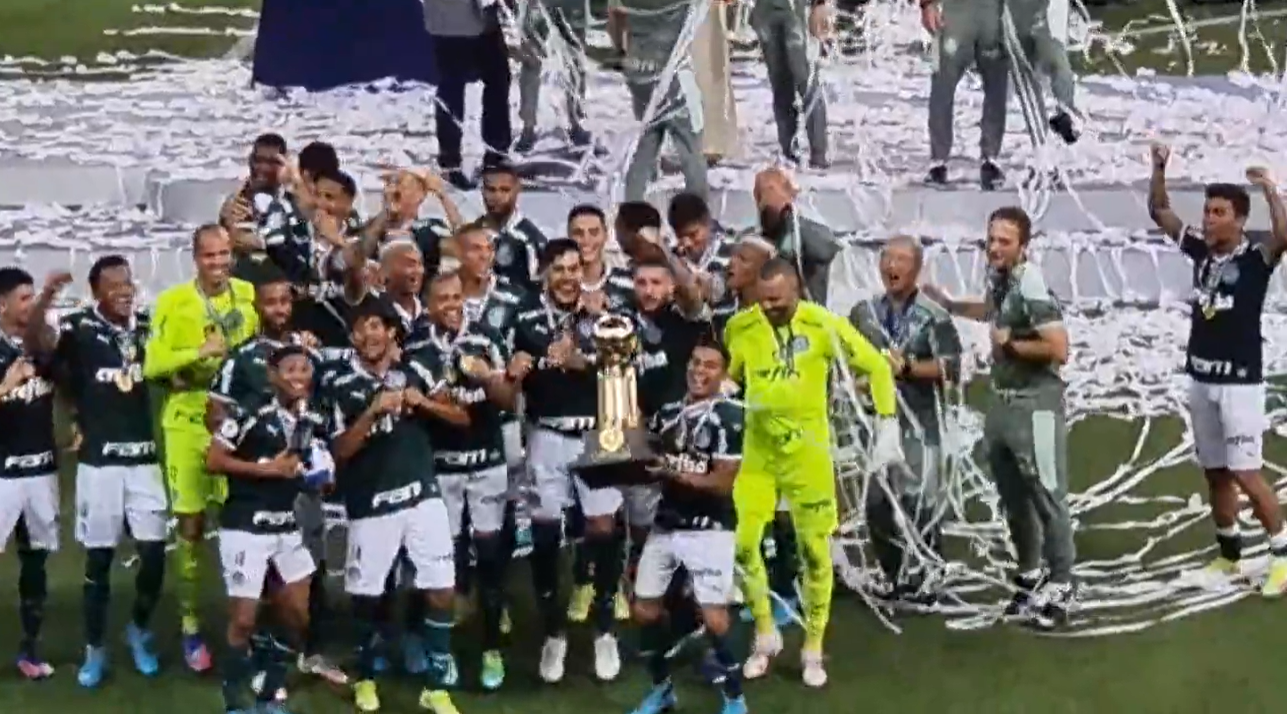
Palmeiras players celebrate the Recopa title

Less than a month after the Club World Cup runner-up finish in Abu Dhabi, Palmeiras contested another international title, the 2022 Recopa Sudamericana, against Athletico Paranaense, the 2021 Copa Sudamericana champions. The Recopa was decided over two legs, the first in Curitiba at Arena da Baixada and the second at Allianz Parque.

In the first leg, Palmeiras secured a 2–2 draw with a stoppage-time penalty by Raphael Veiga, after Jaílson scored their first goal, keeping the tie open.

In the second leg, Palmeiras dominated, winning 2–0 with a free-kick goal by Zé Rafael and the title-clinching goal by Danilo. In Allianz Parque's first international final, Palmeiras claimed an unprecedented title, their fourth under Abel Ferreira.

=== 2022 Campeonato Paulista triumph ===
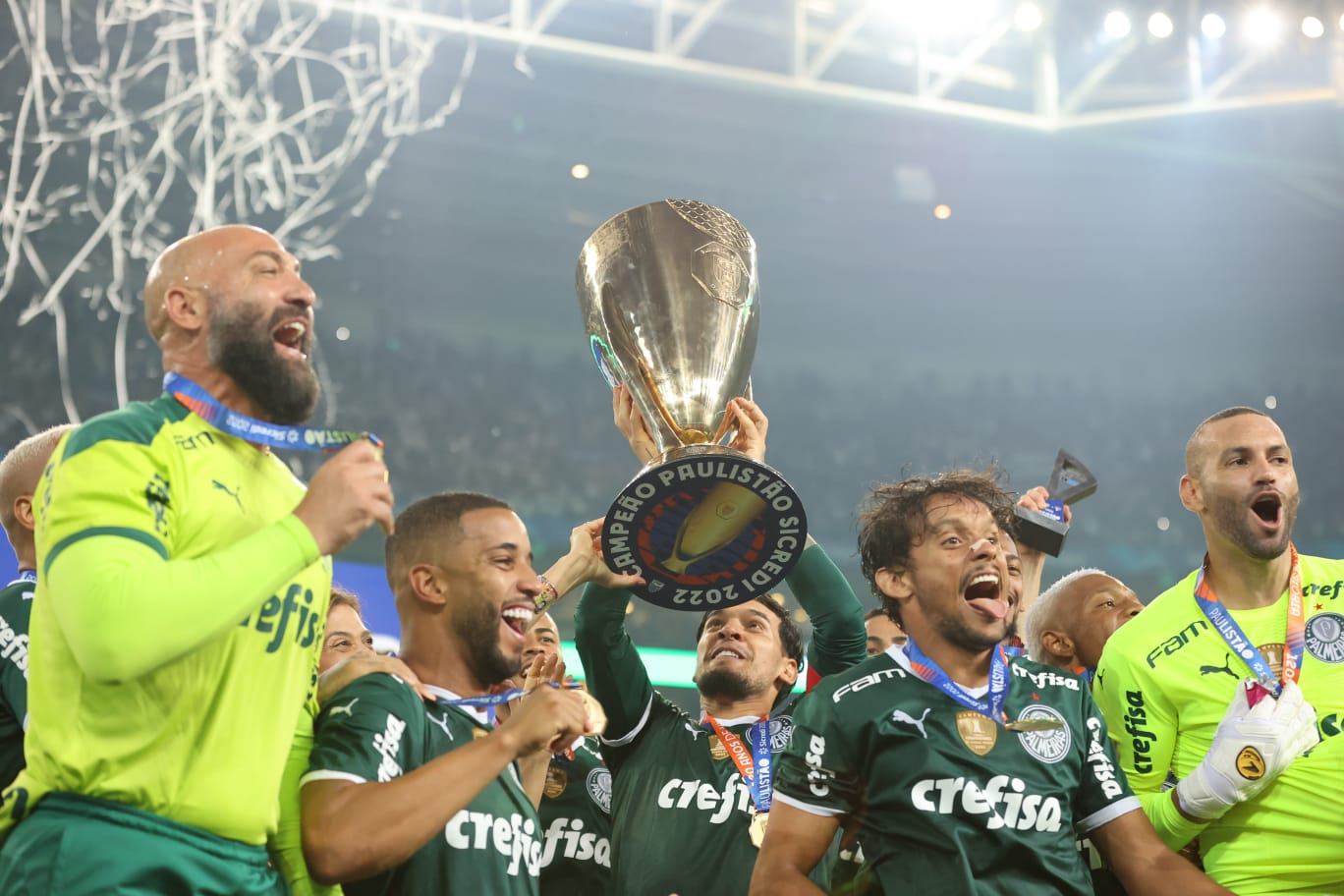
Palmeiras players celebrate the 2022 Campeonato Paulista title

In the 2022 Campeonato Paulista, despite using a mixed squad in some matches, Palmeiras finished the first phase unbeaten with the best record, winning all three derbies against São Paulo, Santos, and Corinthians—a historic first for the club.

After eliminating Ituano in the quarterfinals and Bragantino in the semi-finals, Palmeiras faced São Paulo in the finals. The 2022 final was controversial, as Palmeiras, with the best record and unbeaten, earned the right to host the second leg. However, Allianz Parque was booked for a Maroon 5 concert on April 5, complicating logistics. São Paulo's board rejected a Saturday second leg, insisting on Sunday.

After negotiations with stadium operator WTorre, Palmeiras hosted the second leg with reduced capacity, excluding the Gol Norte section typically occupied by organized fan groups. In the first leg at São Paulo's Morumbi Stadium, with 60,000 fans, São Paulo outplayed Palmeiras, winning 3–1 with two goals by Jonathan Calleri (one from a penalty) and one by Pablo Maia, with Raphael Veiga scoring for Palmeiras. The loss ended Palmeiras’ unbeaten run, with controversy over a VAR-confirmed penalty.

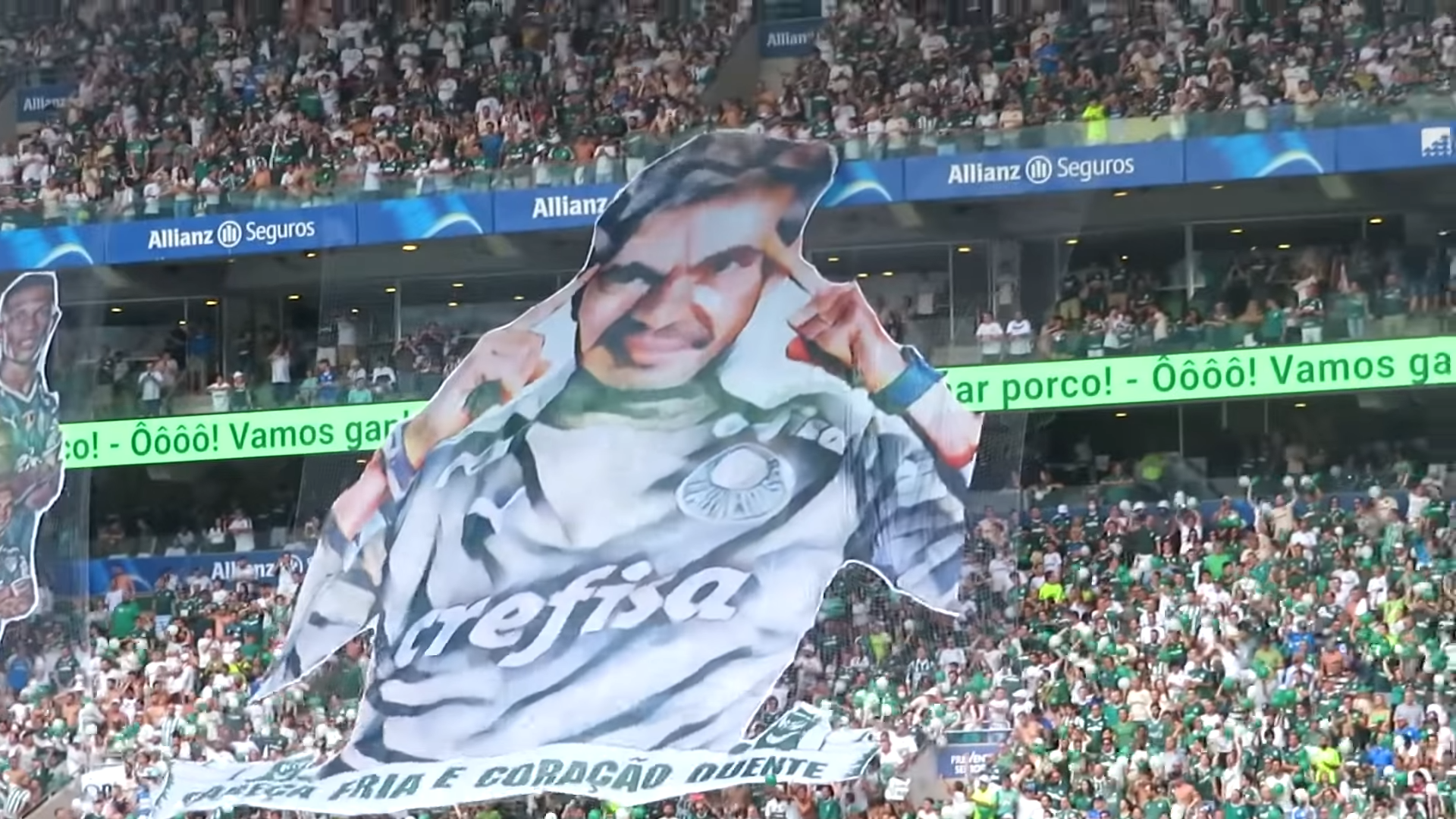
Mosaic featuring Abel Ferreira at Allianz Parque during the 2022 Paulistão final

To prevent São Paulo's back-to-back titles, Palmeiras needed to win by two goals to force a penalty shootout or by three goals or more to win the title outright. On April 3, 2022, Palmeiras delivered a historic performance in the Choque-Rei, thrashing São Paulo 4–0 with an outstanding display by Dudu. Goals by Danilo and Zé Rafael in the first half and two by Raphael Veiga in the second sent 31,000 fans into ecstasy at Allianz Parque. The rout was the largest in a Choque-Rei final, securing Palmeiras’ 24th Paulista title and avenging the previous year's loss.

=== Libertadores semi-finalist with a string of historic records ===
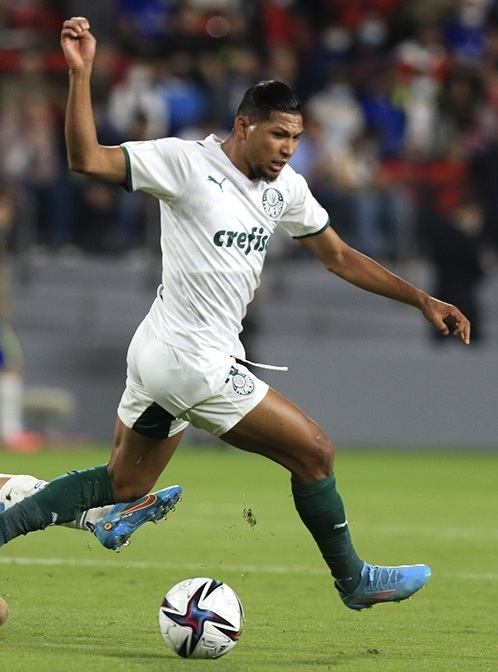
Rony, a key player in the Libertadores for Palmeiras and the team's all-time leading scorer in the competition.

As three-time winners of the Copa Libertadores, Palmeiras came close to a fourth title in 2022, reaching the semi-finals and setting numerous historic records in South America's premier club competition.

In the group stage, Palmeiras recorded their biggest Libertadores win, an 8–1 thrashing of Independiente Petrolero in April 2022, also the largest victory at Allianz Parque.

By the group stage's end, Palmeiras amassed further records, earning 18 points from 18 possible, with a +22 goal difference (25 goals scored, 3 conceded), surpassing Boca Juniors’ 2015 record (18 points, +17 goal difference). They also set a new record for the most goals scored in the group stage, overtaking River Plate's 2020 mark.

In the round of 16, Palmeiras eliminated Cerro Porteño with a 3–0 away win and a 5–0 home rout, featuring a bicycle-kick goal by Rony, a key player in the Libertadores.

In the quarterfinals, Palmeiras staged a historic comeback, drawing 2–2 against Atlético-MG in Belo Horizonte after trailing 2–0. In the return leg at Allianz Parque, despite finishing with nine players after expulsions of Danilo and Gustavo Scarpa, they held a 0–0 draw and won 6–5 on penalties, fueled by the passionate support of the fans.

The quarterfinal tie added more records: the Mineirão draw extended Palmeiras’ unbeaten away streak to 20 games, surpassing River Plate’s 12, and the home draw marked an 18-game overall unbeaten run, matching Atlético-MG’s record.

In the semi-finals, Palmeiras fell to Athletico-PR, losing 1–0 in Curitiba and drawing 2–2 in São Paulo after leading 2–0, with a player sent off.

=== Eleven-time champion in 2022 and more records in the Brazilian Championship ===
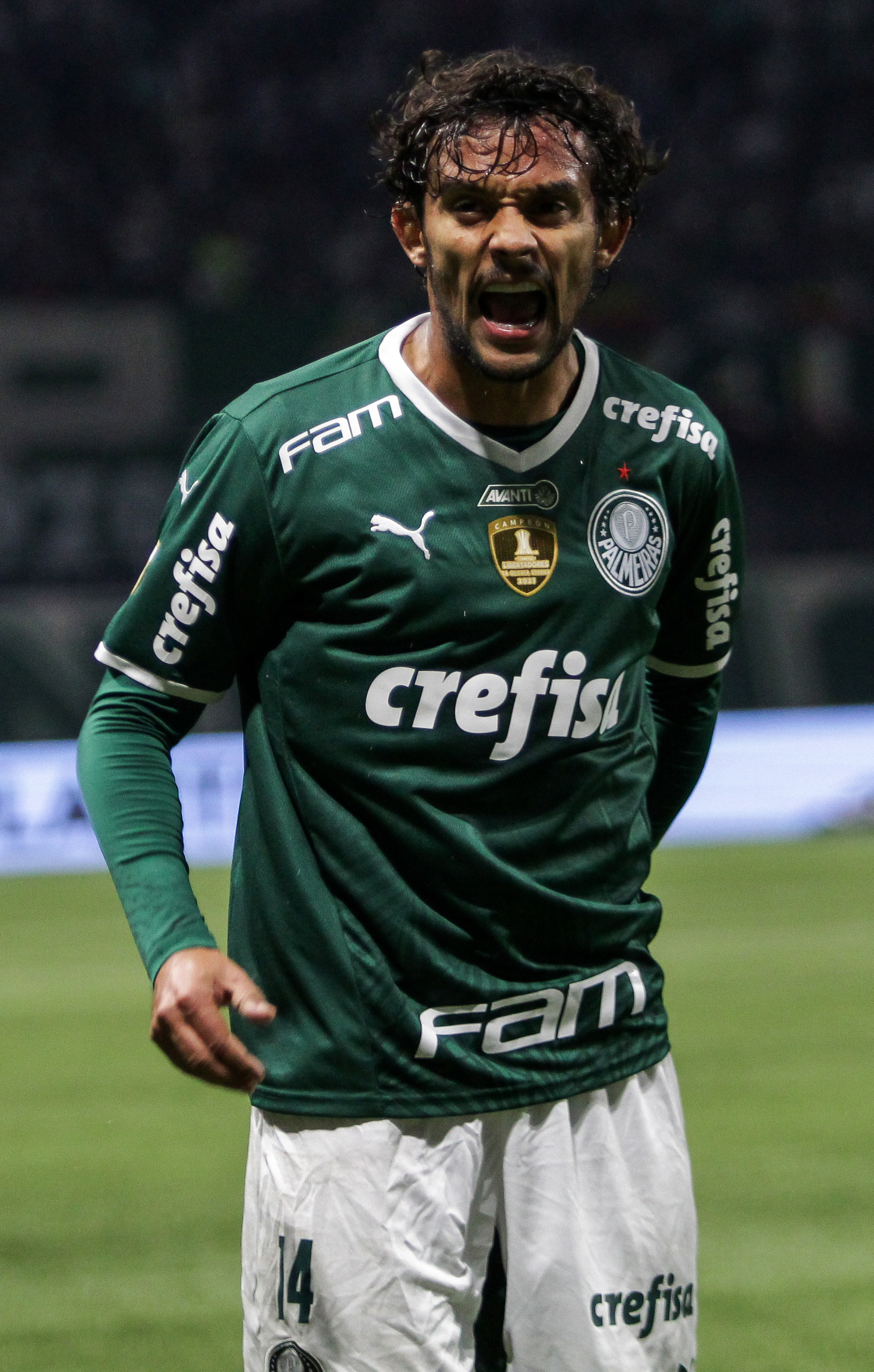
Gustavo Scarpa playing for Palmeiras in 2022

In the 2022 Campeonato Brasileiro, Palmeiras took the lead in the 10th round and held it until the end. With pivotal contributions from Gustavo Scarpa, who filled in for an injured Raphael Veiga, and Rony, who scored a stunning bicycle-kick goal against Fluminense at Maracanã, Abel Ferreira's team clinched their 11th title three rounds early.

Palmeiras recorded their best-ever Brasileirão campaign, earning 81 points, surpassing their 2016 and 2018 marks. With 23 wins, 12 draws, and three losses, they scored a record 66 goals, led both halves of the season, went 22 games unbeaten (exceeding a full half), won all São Paulo derbies, and had the best away record.

The title was sealed on November 2, before Palmeiras played, as second-placed Internacional lost 1–0 to América-MG. In a celebratory match that night, Palmeiras routed Fortaleza 4–0 at Allianz Parque.

The 11th Brasileirão title widened Palmeiras’ record as Brazil's most successful club in the competition and across all top-tier national championships.

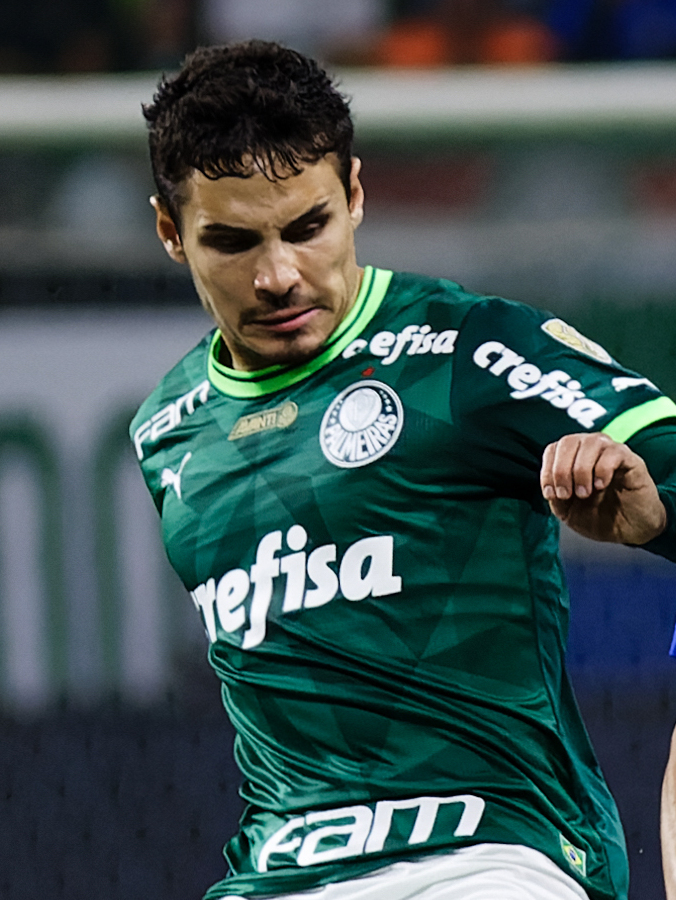
Raphael Veiga

=== 2023 Supercopa do Brasil title ===
In a repeat of 2021, Palmeiras and Flamengo (champions of the 2022 Brasileirão and 2022 Copa do Brasil, respectively) faced off in the 2023 Supercopa do Brasil on January 28, 2023, at Estádio Mané Garrincha. Unlike 2021, when Flamengo won on penalties after a draw, Palmeiras triumphed 4–3 in a thrilling match, with Raphael Veiga and Gabriel Menino each scoring twice to claim the inaugural title.

This marked Abel Ferreira's seventh title with Palmeiras in just over two years, surpassing Luiz Felipe Scolari's six titles as the club's most decorated coach.

=== 2023: 25th Campeonato Paulista title ===
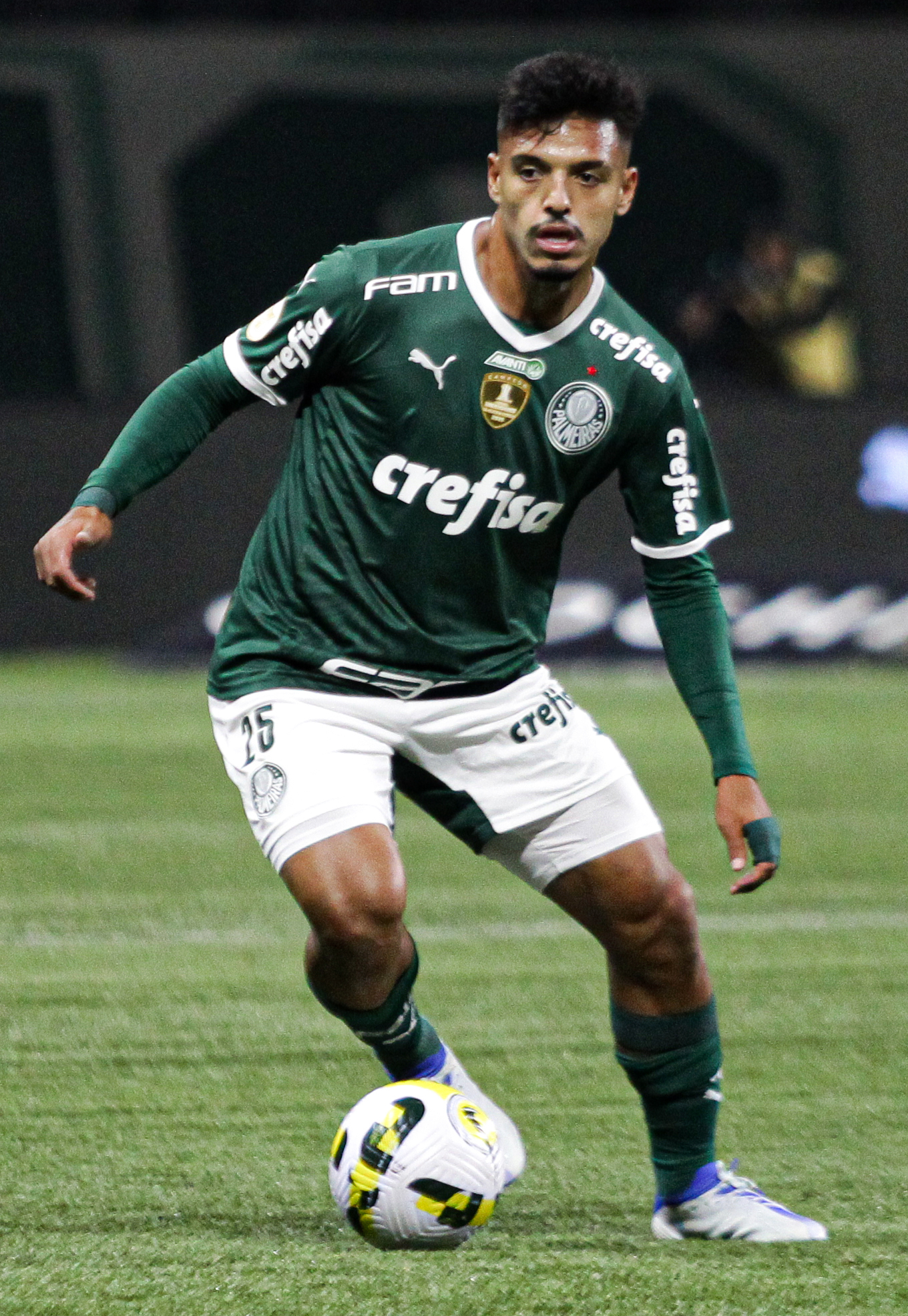
Gabriel Menino

In April 2023, after losing the first leg of the final 2–1 to Água Santa from Diadema, Palmeiras clinched their 25th Paulista title by overturning the deficit with a 4–0 win in the return leg.

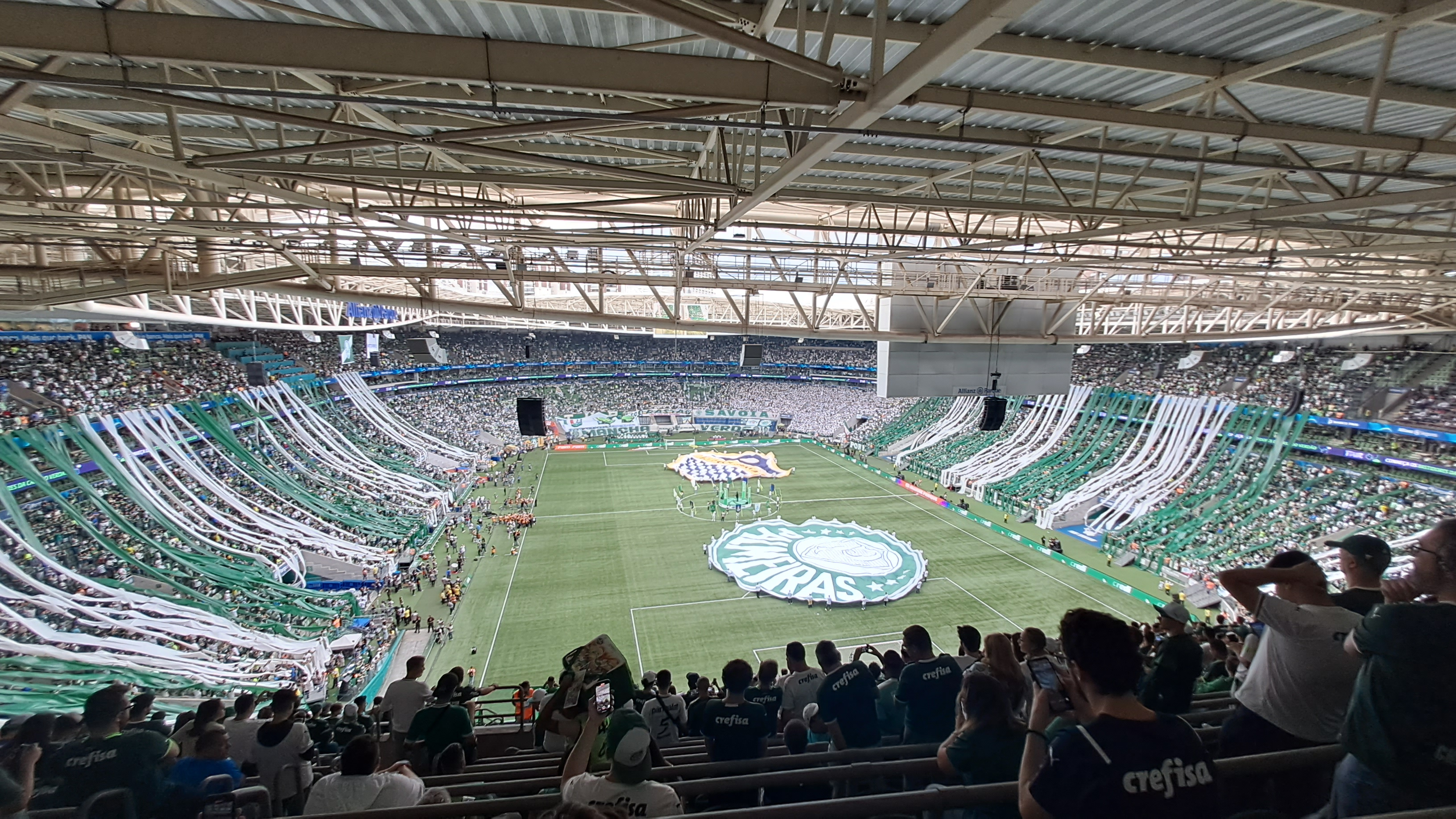
Palmeiras fans at the 2023 Campeonato Paulista final

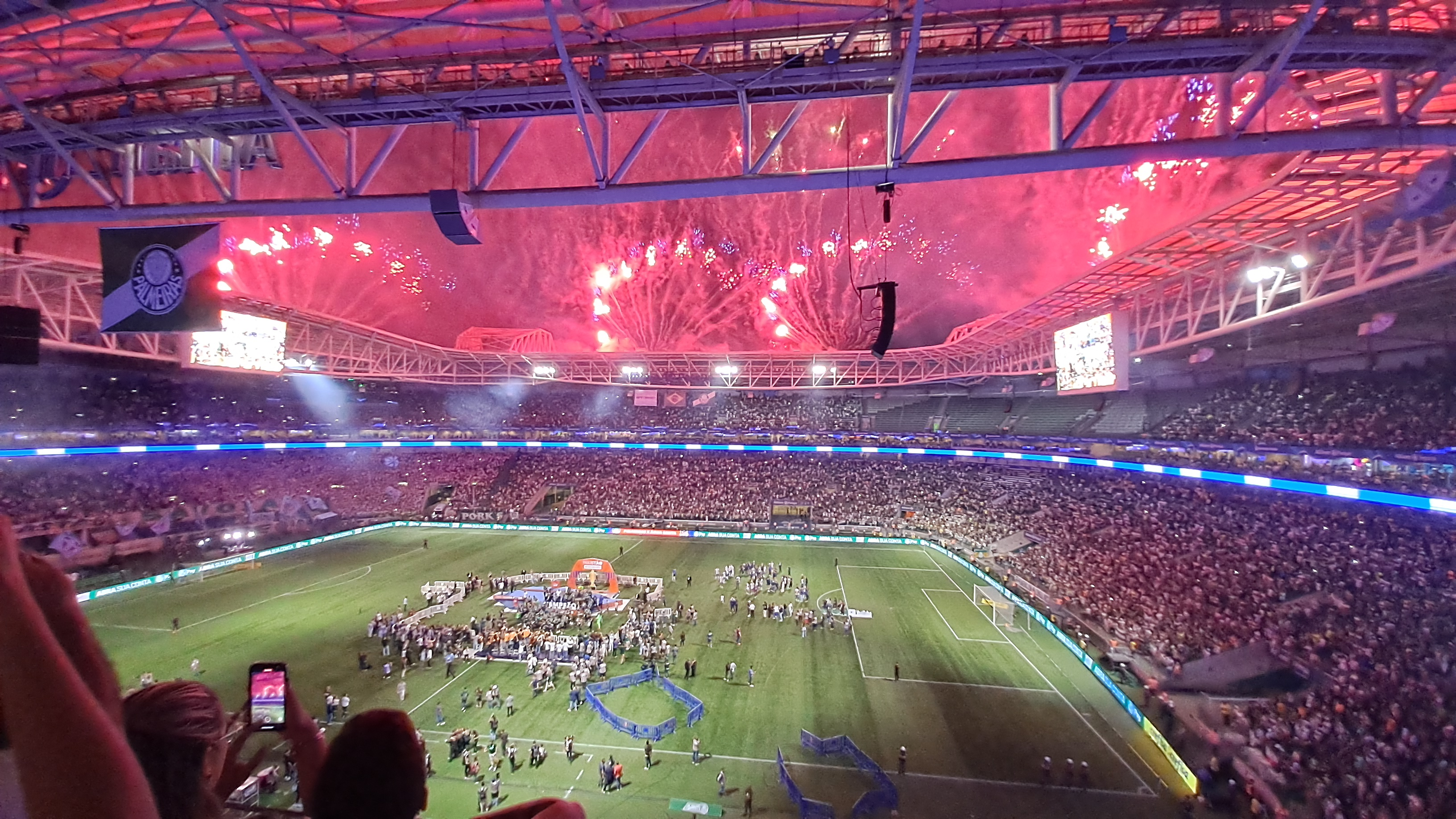
Celebrations at Allianz Parque after Palmeiras’ 2023 Campeonato Paulista triumph

Palmeiras led the 2023 Campeonato Paulista standings for most of the competition, finishing the first phase with the best record for the second consecutive year, earning home advantage in the knockout rounds. After defeating São Bernardo in the quarterfinals and Ituano in the semi-finals, they faced surprise finalists Água Santa, who had eliminated São Paulo and Bragantino.

In the first leg at Arena Barueri, Água Santa stunned Palmeiras 2–1, ending their hopes of an unbeaten title. In the return leg, driven by a record-breaking Allianz Parque crowd, Palmeiras dominated, scoring three first-half goals—two by Gabriel Menino, named man of the match, and one by Endrick. Argentine striker Flaco López sealed the 4–0 rout in the second half, mirroring the 2022 final score against São Paulo.

=== 12th Brasileirão title – The 2023 comeback ===
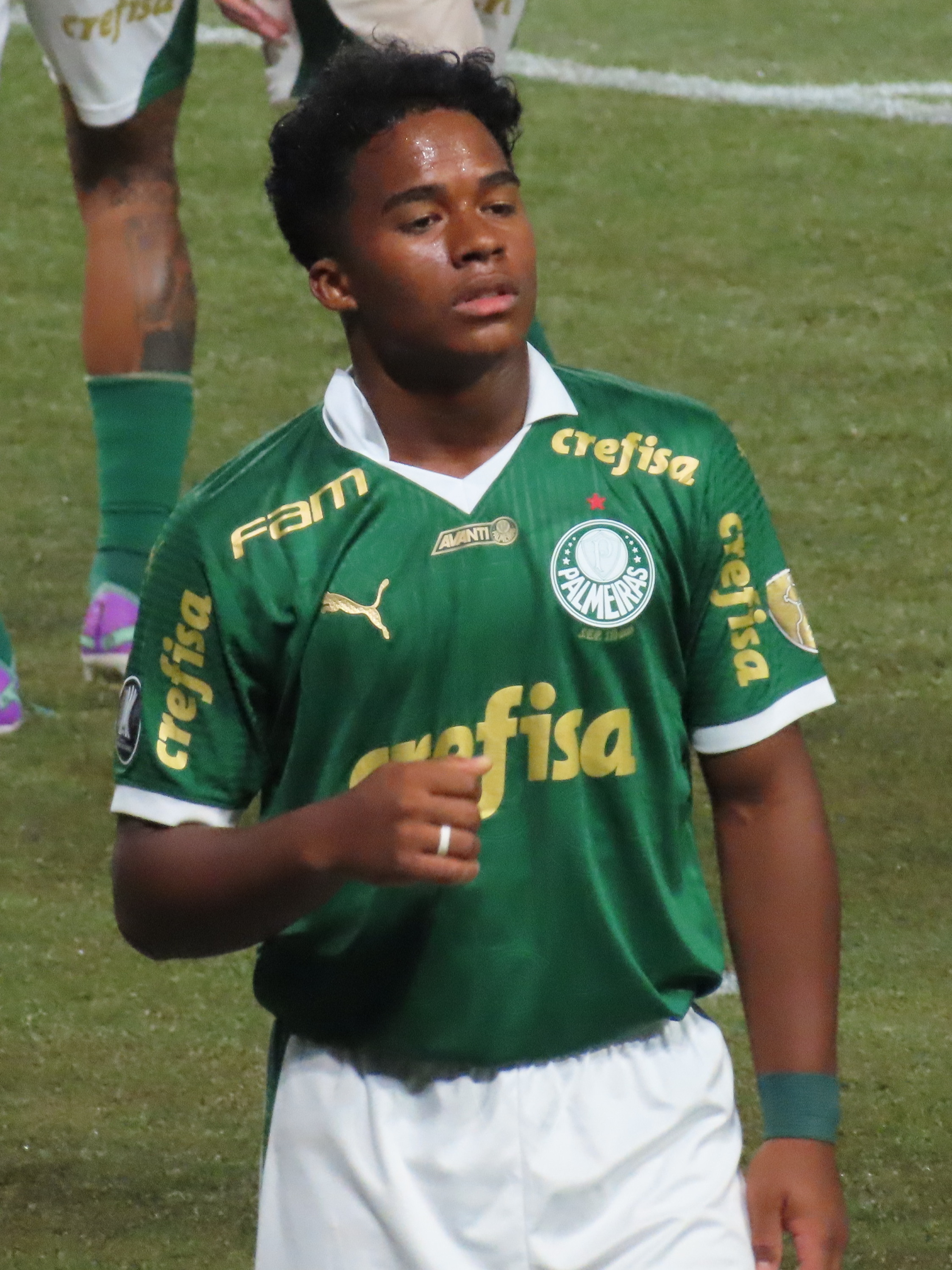
Endrick

After yet another victory in the Paulista Championship, Palmeiras pursued another Brasileirão title while competing in the Copa Libertadores and Copa do Brasil. In the Copa do Brasil, they suffered a quarterfinal exit to São Paulo, losing both legs. In the Libertadores, they again topped the group stage, advanced past Atlético-MG in the round of 16, and Deportivo Pereira in the quarterfinals, but fell to Boca Juniors in the semi-finals after two draws (0–0 and 1–1), losing 4–2 on penalties.

In the 2023 Campeonato Brasileiro, Palmeiras faced a highly competitive race. Botafogo led for 31 rounds, peaking with a 13-point lead over the second-placed team in August. In the 31st round, however, Palmeiras staged a historic comeback, coming from 3–0 down to win 4–3 thanks to young star Endrick, and cut Botafogo's lead to three points.

Some argue that Palmeiras gained momentum earlier, after a 5–0 rout of São Paulo on October 25, 2023, at Allianz Parque, avenging recent Copa do Brasil losses. With two goals each from Breno Lopes and Piquerez, and one from Marcos Rocha, the result matched the biggest Choque-Rei win, set a record for the largest derby victory at Allianz Parque, and was the most lopsided Choque-Rei in Brasileirão history.

Ten days after the Botafogo comeback, Palmeiras took the lead and held it through the final round, securing their 12th Brasileirão title, a back-to-back championship not seen since 1994, dubbed the Heroic Comeback.

=== Third consecutive Paulista title in 2024 ===
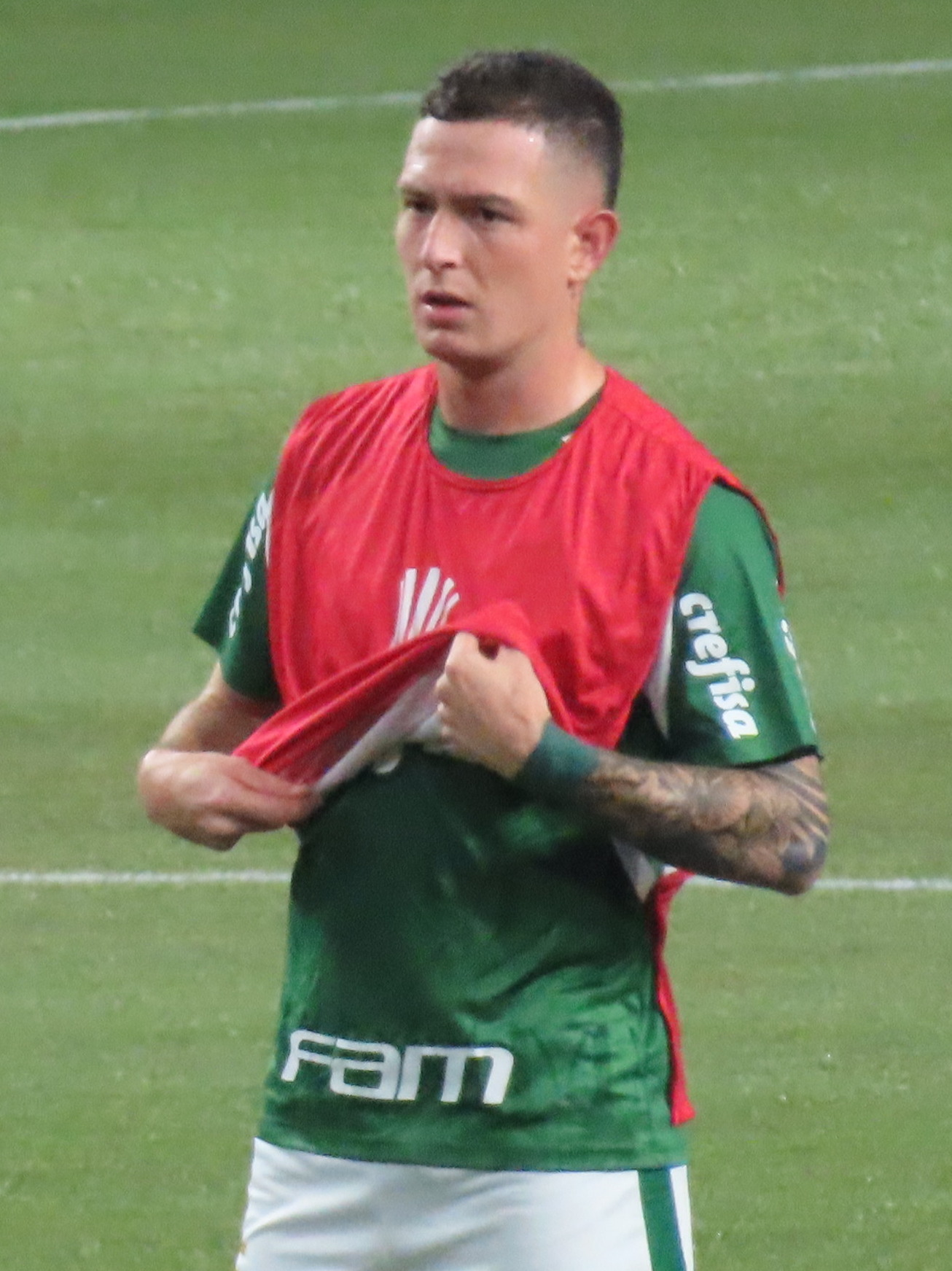
Anibal Moreno

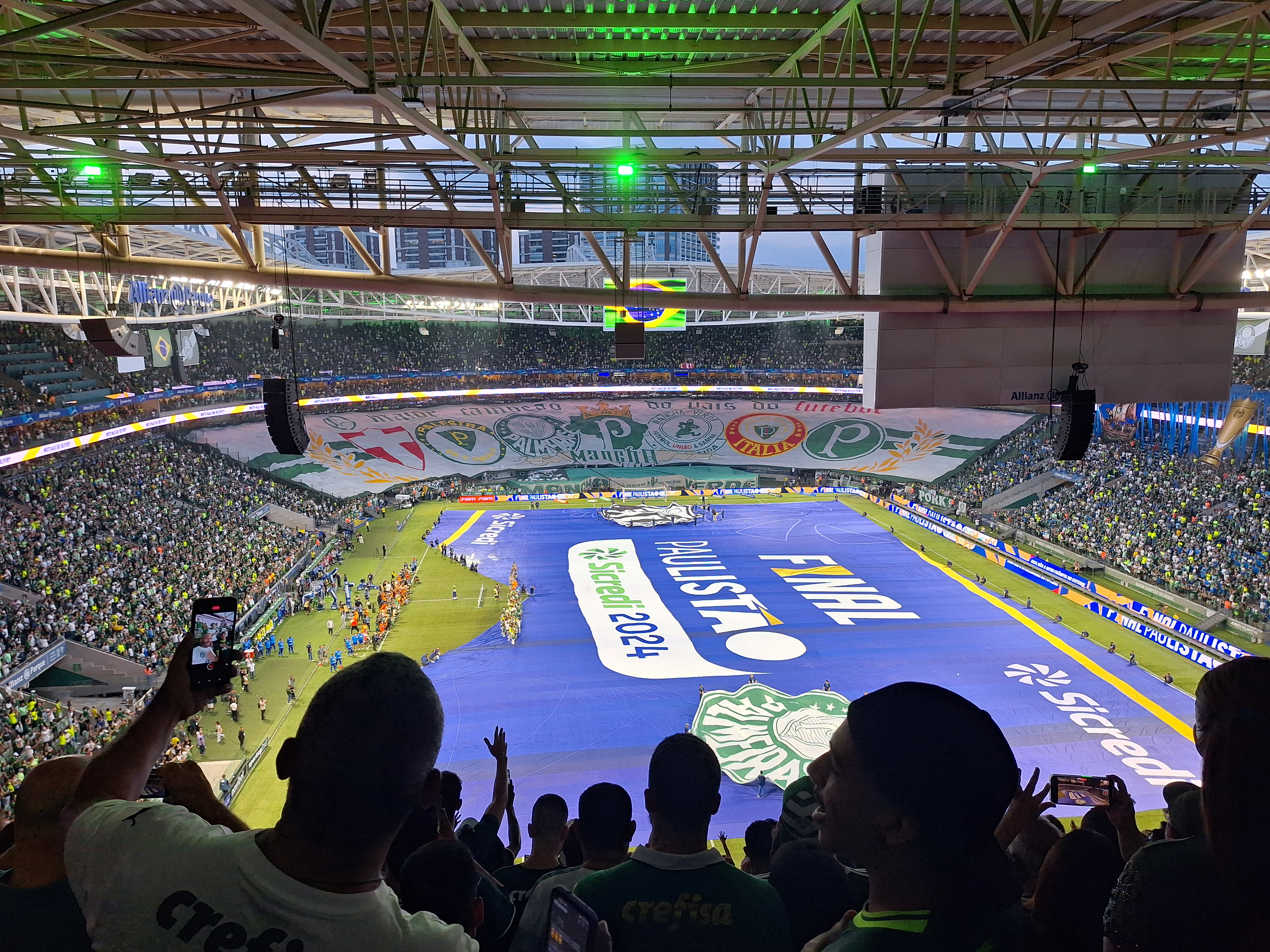
Closing ceremony of the 2024 Campeonato Paulista final at Allianz Parque

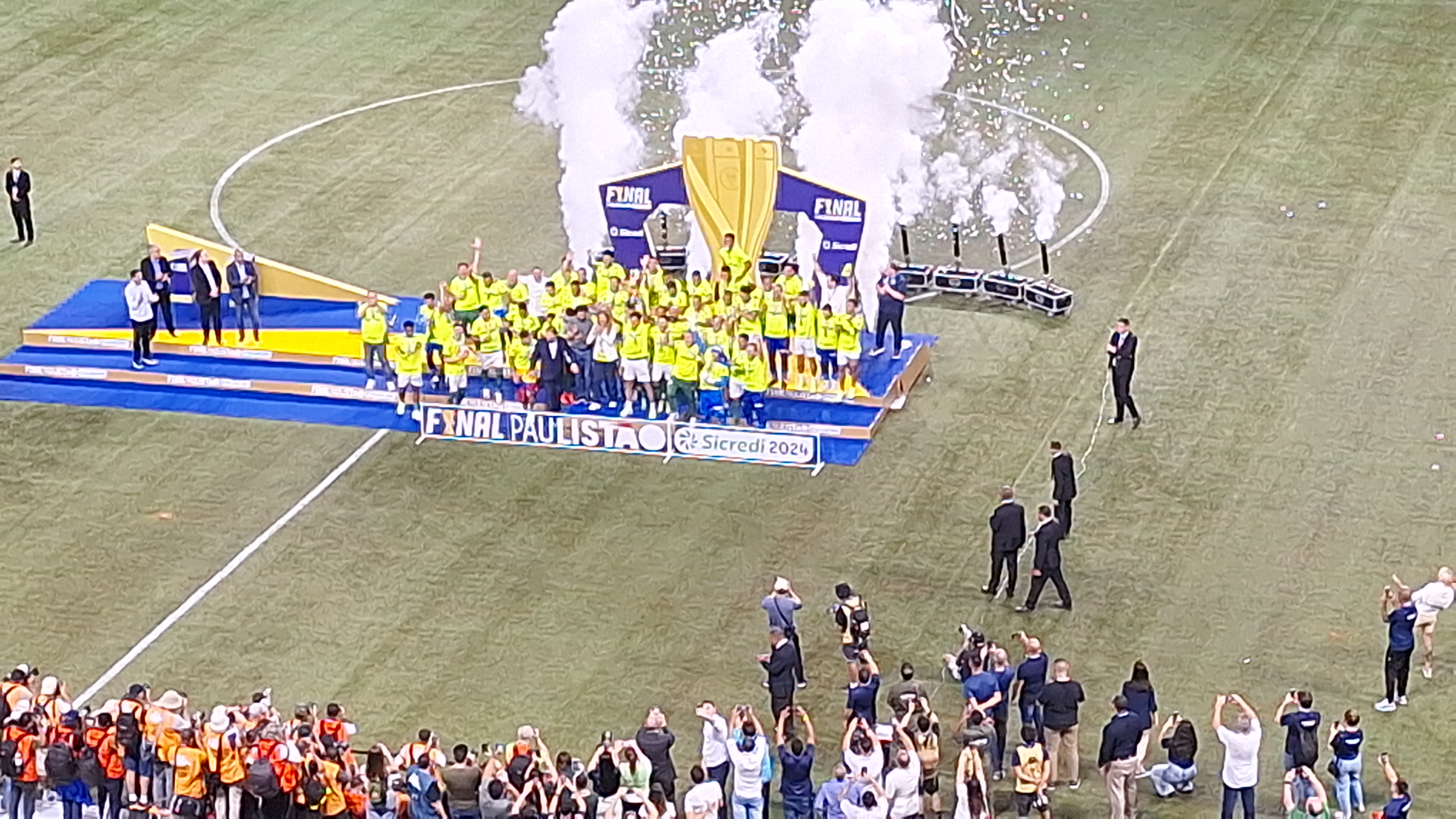
Palmeiras players lift the 2024 Paulista trophy

In 2024, Palmeiras and Santos alternated at the top of the Campeonato Paulista, with Palmeiras finishing the first phase on top.

Both teams advanced through the quarterfinals and semi-finals, setting up another final showdown. Palmeiras, with the best record, hosted the second leg. The first match, on March 31 at Vila Belmiro, saw Santos win 1–0 with a goal by Romulo Otero, giving them the edge.

On April 7 at Allianz Parque, Palmeiras, led by a stellar performance from Endrick and goals by Raphael Veiga (from a penalty) and Aníbal Moreno, won 2–0, overturning the deficit to claim the title—their first triple Paulista title in a row since 1934.

== See also ==
- List of SE Palmeiras seasons
